= List of colleges and universities in the Philippines =

Colleges and universities in the Philippines

This is a partial list of notable higher education institutions in the Philippines.

== Ilocos Region ==
=== Government ===
Name	Type (Note: Legend: LUC=Local University/College; OGS=Other Government School; SUC=State University/College)	Location	Year established	Year granted university status (Note: University status, being a distinctive honor, shall be reserved only for the truly deserving Higher Education Institutions (HEIs) in the country which have proven their excellence in the areas of instruction, research and extension. CHED Memorandom Order No. 48 s. 1996. Sec. 1.)	Regulation status (Note: Autonomous and deregulated status (CMO no. 46 s. 2012 section 25). Alternatively, an HEI may be granted institutional autonomy by law)
Binalatongan Community College	LUC	San Carlos, Pangasinan	2006	not applicable	Regulated
Ilocos Sur Community College	LUC	Bantay, Ilocos Sur	1975	not applicable	Regulated
University of Eastern Pangasinan	LUC	Binalonan	2005		Regulated
Urdaneta City University	LUC	Urdaneta, Pangasinan	1966	2006	Regulated
Don Mariano Marcos Memorial State University-North La Union-Main Campus	SUC Main	Bacnotan	1981		Regulated
Mariano Marcos State University-Main	SUC Main	Batac	1978		Regulated
Pangasinan State University	SUC Main	Lingayen	1979		Regulated
University of Ilocos Philippines-Main Campus	SUC Main	Candon	2010 (as NLPSC)	not applicable	Regulated
University of Northern Philippines	SUC Main	Vigan			Regulated
Don Mariano Marcos Memorial State University-Mid La Union	SUC Satellite	San Fernando, La Union			Regulated
Don Mariano Marcos Memorial State University-Open University	SUC Satellite	San Fernando, La Union		Deregulated (by evaluation)	Regulated
Don Mariano Marcos Memorial State University-South La Union	SUC Satellite	Agoo			Regulated
Mariano Marcos State University-College of Agriculture and Forestry-Dingras	SUC Satellite	Dingras			Regulated
Mariano Marcos State University-College of Aquatic Sciences and Applied Technology	SUC Satellite	Currimao			Regulated
Mariano Marcos State University-College of Industrial Technology-Laoag City	SUC Satellite	Laoag			Regulated
Mariano Marcos State University-College of Teacher Education-Laoag City	SUC Satellite	Laoag			Regulated
Pangasinan State University-Alaminos City	SUC Satellite	Alaminos, Pangasinan			Regulated
Pangasinan State University-Asingan	SUC Satellite	Asingan			Regulated
Pangasinan State University-Bayambang	SUC Satellite	Bayambang			Regulated
Pangasinan State University-Binmaley	SUC Satellite	Binmaley			Regulated
Pangasinan State University-Infanta	SUC Satellite	Infanta, Pangasinan			Regulated
Pangasinan State University-Open University	SUC Satellite	Lingayen			Regulated
Pangasinan State University-San Carlos City	SUC Satellite	San Carlos, Pangasinan			Regulated
Pangasinan State University-Sta. Maria	SUC Satellite	Sta. Maria, Pangasinan			Regulated
Pangasinan State University-Urdaneta City	SUC Satellite	Urdaneta, Pangasinan			Regulated
University of Ilocos Philippines-Candon	SUC Satellite	Candon, Ilocos Sur		not applicable	Regulated
University of Ilocos Philippines-Cervantes	SUC Satellite	Cervantes, Ilocos Sur	1965 (as CNAIS)	not applicable	Regulated
University of Ilocos Philippines-Narvacan	SUC Satellite	Narvacan, Ilocos Sur	1964 (as NSF)	not applicable	Regulated
University of Ilocos Philippines-Santiago	SUC Satellite	Santiago, Ilocos Sur	1965 (as ISESPSCI)	not applicable	Regulated
University of Ilocos Philippines-Sta. Maria Campus	SUC Main	Sta. Maria, Ilocos Sur	1913 (as Sta. Maria Farm School)	2022	Regulated
University of Ilocos Philippines-Tagudin	SUC Satellite	Tagudin, Ilocos Sur	1916 (as Tagudin HS)	not applicable	Regulated

=== Private ===
Name	Location	Year established	Year granted university status	Regulation status
The Adelphi College	Lingayen		not applicable	Regulated
Malasiqui Agno Valley College	Malasiqui		not applicable	Regulated
Asbury College	Anda, Pangasinan		not applicable	Regulated
Asiacareer College Foundation	Dagupan		not applicable	Regulated
CICOSAT Colleges	San Fernando, La Union		not applicable	Regulated
Universidad de Dagupan	Dagupan		2022	Regulated
Dagupan Colleges Foundation	Dagupan		not applicable	Regulated
Data Center College of the Philippines of Laoag City	Laoag		not applicable	Regulated
Divine Word College of Laoag	Laoag		not applicable	Regulated
Divine Word College of Urdaneta	Urdaneta, Pangasinan		not applicable	Regulated
Divine Word College of Vigan	Vigan		not applicable	Regulated
The Great Plebeian College	Alaminos, Pangasinan		not applicable	Regulated
Lorma Colleges	San Fernando City, La Union		not applicable	Deregulated (by evaluation) (Note: Effectivity Period: September 16, 2024 to September 15, 2027.)
Luna Colleges	Tayug		not applicable	Regulated
University of Luzon	Perez Blvd., Dagupan			Autonomous (by evaluation)
Lyceum Northern Luzon	Urdaneta, Pangasinan		not applicable	Regulated
Mary Help of Christians College Seminary	Dagupan		not applicable	Regulated
Northern Christian College	Laoag		not applicable	Regulated
Northern Luzon Adventist College	Sison, Pangasinan		not applicable	Regulated
Northern Philippines College for Maritime Science and Technology	San Fernando, La Union		not applicable	Regulated
Northwestern University	Laoag			Regulated
Osias Educational Foundation	Balaoan		not applicable	Regulated
Palaris College	San Carlos, Pangasinan		not applicable	Regulated
Panpacific University	Urdaneta, Pangasinan			Regulated
Pangasinan Merchant Marine Academy	Dagupan		not applicable	Regulated
Perpetual Help College of Pangasinan	Malasiqui		not applicable	Regulated
Polytechnic College of La Union	Agoo		not applicable	Regulated
Philippine College of Science and Technology	Calasiao		not applicable	Regulated
PIMSAT Colleges-Dagupan	Dagupan		not applicable	Regulated
Saint Columban's College	Lingayen		not applicable	Regulated
Saint Louis College-City of San Fernando	San Fernando, La Union		not applicable	Regulated
Saint Mary's College Sta. Maria Ilocos Sur	Sta. Maria, Ilocos Sur		not applicable	Regulated
Saint Paul College of Ilocos Sur	Bantay, Ilocos Sur		not applicable	Regulated
San Carlos College	San Carlos, Pangasinan		not applicable	Regulated
Sea and Sky College	San Fernando, La Union		not applicable	Regulated
Union Christian College	San Fernando, La Union		not applicable	Regulated
University of Pangasinan	Dagupan			Regulated
NJ Valdez Colleges Foundation	Villasis, Pangasinan		not applicable	Regulated
Virgen Milagrosa University Foundation	San Carlos, Pangasinan			Autonomous (by evaluation)
Metro-Dagupan Colleges	Mangaldan		not applicable	Regulated
Pass College	Alaminos, Pangasinan		not applicable	Regulated
AMA Computer College-Pangasinan	Calasiao		not applicable	Regulated
AMA Computer College-Laoag City	Laoag		not applicable	Regulated
Lyceum Northwestern University	Dagupan			Autonomous (by evaluation)
Macro Colleges	Vigan		not applicable	Regulated
STI College-Dagupan	Dagupan		not applicable	Regulated
AMA Computer College-La Union	San Fernando, La Union		not applicable	Regulated
Golden West Colleges	Alaminos, Pangasinan		not applicable	Regulated
Lyceum Northwestern University-Urdaneta Campus	Urdaneta, Pangasinan		not applicable	Regulated
Data Center College of the Philippines-Vigan City	Vigan		not applicable	Regulated
Colegio San Jose De Alaminos	Alaminos, Pangasinan		not applicable	Regulated
Colegio De San Juan De Letran-Manaoag	Manaoag		not applicable	Regulated
South Ilocandia College of Arts and Technology	Aringay		not applicable	Regulated
La Union College of Science and Technology	Bauang		not applicable	Regulated
Mystical Rose College of Science and Technology	Mangatarem		not applicable	Regulated
St. Therese College Foundation	San Carlos, Pangasinan		not applicable	Regulated
ABE International College of Business and Accountancy-Urdaneta City	Urdaneta, Pangasinan		not applicable	Regulated
Panpacific University North Philippines-Tayug	Tayug			Regulated
Kingfisher School of Business & Finance	Dagupan		not applicable	Regulated
NICOSAT Colleges	Candon		not applicable	Regulated
St. Camillus College of Manaoag Foundation	Manaoag		not applicable	Regulated
International College for Excellence	Urdaneta, Pangasinan		not applicable	Regulated
Philippine College of Northwestern Luzon	Agoo		not applicable	Regulated
Philippine Darakbang Theological College	Binalonan, Pangasinan		not applicable	Regulated
Saint John Bosco College of Northern Luzon	San Fernando, La Union		not applicable	Regulated
Rosales-Wesleyan Bible College	Rosales, Pangasinan		not applicable	Regulated
La Union Christian Comprehensive College	Rosario, La Union		not applicable	Regulated
Immaculate Conception School of Theology	Vigan		not applicable	Regulated
WCC Aeronautical & Technological College	Binalonan		not applicable	Regulated
PIMSAT Colleges-San Carlos City	San Carlos, Pangasinan		not applicable	Regulated
Mary Help of Christians Theology Seminary	San Fabian, Pangasinan		not applicable	Regulated
STI College-Vigan	Vigan		not applicable	Regulated
STI College-Laoag	Laoag		not applicable	Regulated
Señor Tesoro College	Calasiao		not applicable	Regulated
PHINMA-Upang College Urdaneta	Urdaneta, Pangasinan		not applicable	Regulated
Mary Cause of Our Joy College Seminary	Bacarra		not applicable	Regulated
St. Benedict College of Northern Luzon	Vigan		not applicable	Regulated
STI San Jose Del Monte	City of San Fernando, La Union		not applicable	Regulated

== Cagayan Valley ==
=== Government ===
Name	Type	Location	Year established	Year granted university status	Regulation status
Batanes State College	SUC Main	Basco, Batanes		not applicable	Regulated
Isabela State University-Main (Echague)	SUC Main	Echague			Regulated
Nueva Vizcaya State University - Main Bayombong	SUC Main	Bayombong			Regulated
Quirino State University	SUC Main	Diffun			Regulated
Cagayan State University-Andrews	SUC Main	Tuguegarao			Regulated
Isabela State University-Angadanan Campus	SUC Satellite	Angadanan			Regulated
Cagayan State University-Tuguegarao (Carig)	SUC Satellite	Tuguegarao			Regulated
Isabela State University-Cauayan Campus	SUC Satellite	Cauayan City, Isabela			Regulated
Cagayan State University-Aparri	SUC Satellite	Aparri			Regulated
Cagayan State University-Gonzaga	SUC Satellite	Gonzaga, Cagayan			Regulated
Cagayan State University-Lallo	SUC Satellite	Lal-Lo			Regulated
Cagayan State University-Lasam	SUC Satellite	Lasam			Regulated
Cagayan State University-Piat	SUC Satellite	Piat, Cagayan			Regulated
Cagayan State University-Sanchez Mira	SUC Satellite	Sanchez Mira			Regulated
Isabela State University-San Mariano Campus	SUC Satellite	San Mariano, Isabela			Regulated
Isabela State University-Cabagan	SUC Satellite	Cabagan			Regulated
Isabela State University-Ilagan Campus	SUC Satellite	Ilagan			Regulated
Isabela State University-Jones Campus	SUC Satellite	Jones, Isabela			Regulated
Isabela State University-Roxas Campus	SUC Satellite	Roxas, Isabela			Regulated
Isabela State University-San Mateo Campus	SUC Satellite	San Mateo, Isabela			Regulated
Nueva Vizcaya State University-Bambang	SUC Satellite	Bambang, Nueva Vizcaya			Regulated
Philippine Normal University-North Luzon Campus	SUC Satellite	Alicia, Isabela			Regulated
Quirino State University - Cabarroguis	SUC Satellite	Cabarroguis			Regulated
Quirino State University - Maddela	SUC Satellite	Maddela			Regulated
Isabela State University-Palanan Campus	SUC Satellite	Palanan			Regulated

=== Private ===
Name	Location	Year established	Year granted university status	Regulation status
Aldersgate College	Solano, Nueva Vizcaya		not applicable	Regulated
University of Cagayan Valley	Tuguegarao			Regulated
Eveland Christian College	San Mateo, Isabela		not applicable	Regulated
Isabela Colleges	Cauayan City, Isabela		not applicable	Regulated
University of La Salette	Santiago City, Isabela			Regulated
Lyceum of Aparri	Aparri		not applicable	Regulated
Lyceum of Tuao	Tuao		not applicable	Regulated
Medical Colleges of Northern Philippines	Peñablanca		not applicable	Regulated
Northeastern College	Santiago City, Isabela		not applicable	Regulated
Northern Cagayan Colleges Foundation	Ballesteros, Cagayan		not applicable	Regulated
Our Lady of the Pillar College-Cauayan	Cauayan City, Isabela		not applicable	Regulated
Patria Sable Corpus College	Santiago City, Isabela		not applicable	Regulated
PLT College	Bayombong		not applicable	Regulated
Quezon Colleges of the North	Ballesteros, Cagayan		not applicable	Regulated
Saint Anthony's College	Sta. Ana, Cagayan		not applicable	Regulated
Saint Dominic College of Batanes	Basco, Batanes		not applicable	Regulated
St. Ferdinand College-Ilagan	Ilagan		not applicable	Regulated
Saint Joseph's College of Baggao	Baggao		not applicable	Regulated
University of Saint Louis-Tuguegarao	Mabini Street, Tuguegarao			Autonomous (by evaluation)
Saint Mary's University of Bayombong	Bayombong			Regulated
Saint Paul University Philippines	Mabini Street, Tuguegarao			Autonomous (by evaluation)
Mallig Plains Colleges	Mallig		not applicable	Regulated
FL Vargas College-Tuguegarao	Tuguegarao		not applicable	Regulated
Philippine Law Enforcement College	Tuguegarao City		not applicable	Regulated
International School of Asia and the Pacific	Peñablanca		not applicable	Regulated
Isabela College of Arts and Technology	Cauayan City, Isabela		not applicable	Regulated
AMA Computer College-Santiago City	Santiago City, Isabela		not applicable	Regulated
Cagayan Valley Computer and Information Technology College	Santiago City, Isabela		not applicable	Regulated
John Wesley College	Tuguegarao		not applicable	Regulated
AMA Computer College-Tuguegarao City	Tuguegarao		not applicable	Regulated
SISTECH College of Santiago City	Santiago City, Isabela		not applicable	Regulated
Santiago City Colleges	Santiago City, Isabela		not applicable	Regulated
Saint Ferdinand College-Cabagan Campus	Cabagan		not applicable	Regulated
F.L. Vargas College-Abulug Campus	Abulug		not applicable	Regulated
Metropolitan School of Science and Technology	Santiago City, Isabela		not applicable	Regulated
University of Perpetual Help System	Cauayan City, Isabela			Regulated
King's College of the Philippines-Bambang	Bambang, Nueva Vizcaya		not applicable	Regulated
Global Academy of Technology and Entrepreneurship	Santiago City, Isabela		not applicable	Regulated
HGBaquiran College	Tumauini		not applicable	Regulated
Infant Jesus Montessori School (College Department)	Santiago City, Isabela		not applicable	Regulated
Maila Rosario Colleges	Tuguegarao		not applicable	Regulated
Our Lady of the Pillar College-Cauayan San Manuel Branch	San Manuel, Isabela		not applicable	Regulated
Northeast Luzon Adventist College	Alicia, Isabela		not applicable	Regulated
La Salette of Roxas College	Roxas, Isabela		not applicable	Regulated
STI College-Cauayan	Cauayan City, Isabela		not applicable	Regulated

== Central Luzon ==
=== Government ===
Name	Type	Location	Year established	Year granted university status	Regulation status
Dalubhasaang Politekniko ng Lungsod ng Baliwag	LUC	Baliwag		not applicable	Regulated
Bulacan Polytechnic College	LUC	Malolos		not applicable	Regulated
City College of Angeles	LUC	Angeles City		not applicable	Regulated
City College of San Fernando	LUC	San Fernando, Pampanga		not applicable	Regulated
City College of San Jose del Monte	LUC	San Jose del Monte		not applicable	Regulated
Eduardo L. Joson Memorial College	LUC	Palayan		not applicable	Regulated
Gapan City College	LUC	Gapan		not applicable	Regulated
Gordon College	LUC	Olongapo		not applicable	Regulated
Guagua Community College	LUC	Guagua		not applicable	Regulated
Kolehiyo ng Subic	LUC	Olongapo		not applicable	Regulated
Limay Polytechnic College	LUC	Limay, Bataan		not applicable	Regulated
Mabalacat City College	LUC	Mabalacat		not applicable	Regulated
Norzagaray College	LUC	Norzagaray		not applicable	Regulated
Pambayang Dalubhasaan ng Marilao	LUC	Marilao		not applicable	Regulated
Polytechnic College of Botolan	LUC	Botolan		not applicable	Regulated
Polytechnic College of the City of Meycauayan	LUC	Meycauayan		not applicable	Regulated
Aurora State College of Technology	SUC Main	Baler, Aurora		not applicable	Regulated
Bataan Peninsula State University	SUC Main	Balanga, Bataan			Regulated
Bulacan Agricultural State College	SUC Main	San Ildefonso, Bulacan		not applicable	Regulated
Bulacan State University-Main	SUC Main	Malolos			Regulated
Central Luzon State University	SUC Main	Muñoz, Nueva Ecija			Regulated
Pampanga State University-Main	SUC Main	Bacolor, Pampanga	1861		Regulated
Nueva Ecija University of Science and Technology-Main	SUC Main	Cabanatuan			Regulated
Pampanga State Agricultural University	SUC Main	Magalang, Pampanga			Regulated
Philippine Merchant Marine Academy	SUC Main	San Narciso, Zambales		not applicable	Regulated
President Ramon Magsaysay State University	SUC Main	Iba, Zambales			Regulated
Tarlac Agricultural University	SUC Main	Camiling			Regulated
Tarlac State University	SUC Main	Tarlac City			Regulated
Aurora State College of Technology-Bazal	SUC Satellite	Maria Aurora, Aurora		not applicable	Regulated
Aurora State College of Technology-Casiguran	SUC Satellite	Casiguran, Aurora		not applicable	Regulated
Bataan Peninsula State University-Abucay	SUC Satellite	Abucay			Regulated
Bataan Peninsula State University-Bagac	SUC Satellite	Bagac, Bataan			Regulated
Bataan Peninsula State University-Balanga	SUC Satellite	Balanga, Bataan			Regulated
Bataan Peninsula State University-Dinalupihan	SUC Satellite	Dinalupihan			Regulated
Bataan Peninsula State University-Orani	SUC Satellite	Orani, Bataan			Regulated
Bulacan Agricultural State College-Doña Remedios Trinidad	SUC Satellite	Doña Remedios Trinidad, Bulacan		not applicable	Regulated
Bulacan State University-Bustos	SUC Satellite	Bustos, Bulacan			Regulated
Bulacan State University-Sarmiento Campus	SUC Satellite	San Jose del Monte, Bulacan			Regulated
Bulacan State University-Meneses Campus	SUC Satellite	Bulakan, Bulacan			Regulated
Bulacan State University-Hagonoy	SUC Satellite	Hagonoy, Bulacan			Regulated
Bulacan State University-San Rafael	SUC Satellite	San Rafael, Bulacan			Regulated
Pampanga State University-Apalit	SUC Satellite	Apalit			Regulated
Pampanga State University-Candaba	SUC Satellite	Candaba, Pampanga			Regulated
Pampanga State University-Lubao	SUC Satellite	Lubao			Regulated
Pampanga State University-Mexico	SUC Satellite	Mexico, Pampanga			Regulated
Pampanga State University-Porac	SUC Satellite	Porac, Pampanga			Regulated
Pampanga State University-Sto.Tomas	SUC Satellite	Sto. Tomas, Pampanga			Regulated
Nueva Ecija University of Science and Technology-Atate	SUC Satellite	Palayan			Regulated
Nueva Ecija University of Science and Technology-Carranglan	SUC Satellite	Carranglan, Nueva Ecija			Regulated
Nueva Ecija University of Science and Technology-Fort Magsaysay	SUC Satellite	Palayan			Regulated
Nueva Ecija University of Science and Technology-Gapan City Campus	SUC Satellite	Gapan			Regulated
Nueva Ecija University of Science and Technology-Papaya	SUC Satellite	General Tinio			Regulated
Nueva Ecija University of Science and Technology-Peñaranda	SUC Satellite	Cabanatuan			Regulated
Nueva Ecija University of Science and Technology-San Antonio Campus	SUC Satellite	San Antonio, Nueva Ecija			Regulated
Nueva Ecija University of Science and Technology-San Isidro Campus	SUC Satellite	San Isidro, Nueva Ecija			Regulated
Nueva Ecija University of Science and Technology-San Leonardo	SUC Satellite	San Leonardo, Nueva Ecija			Regulated
Nueva Ecija University of Science and Technology-Sto. Domingo	SUC Satellite	Sto. Domingo, Nueva Ecija			Regulated
Nueva Ecija University of Science and Technology-Sebani Estate Agricultural College	SUC Satellite	Gabaldon, Nueva Ecija			Regulated
Nueva Ecija University of Science and Technology-Sumacab Campus	SUC Satellite	Cabanatuan			Regulated
Nueva Ecija University of Science and Technology-Talavera	SUC Satellite	Talavera, Nueva Ecija			Regulated
Philippine State College of Aeronautics-Pampanga Extension	SUC Satellite	Floridablanca, Pampanga		not applicable	Regulated
Polytechnic University of the Philippines-Cabiao	SUC Satellite	Cabiao, Nueva Ecija			Regulated
Polytechnic University of the Philippines-Mariveles	SUC Satellite	Mariveles, Bataan			Regulated
Polytechnic University of the Philippines-Pulilan	SUC Satellite	Pulilan, Bulacan			Regulated
Polytechnic University of the Philippines-Sta. Maria Bulacan	SUC Satellite	Santa Maria, Bulacan			Regulated
President Ramon Magsaysay State University-Botolan	SUC Satellite	Botolan, Zambales			Regulated
President Ramon Magsaysay State University-Candelaria	SUC Satellite	Candelaria, Zambales			Regulated
President Ramon Magsaysay State University-Castillejos	SUC Satellite	Castillejos, Zambales			Regulated
President Ramon Magsaysay State University-Masinloc	SUC Satellite	Masinloc, Zambales			Regulated
President Ramon Magsaysay State University-San Marcelino	SUC Satellite	San Marcelino, Zambales			Regulated
President Ramon Magsaysay State University-Sta. Cruz	SUC Satellite	Sta. Cruz, Zambales			Regulated
University of the Philippines-Diliman (Pampanga)	SUC Satellite	San Fernando, Pampanga			Autonomous (by legislation) (Note: Republic Act 9500, section 11)
University of the Philippines-Diliman (Olongapo City)	SUC Satellite	Olongapo, Zambales			Autonomous (by legislation)
University of the Philippines- Manila School of Health Sciences Extension Campus-Baler	SUC Satellite	Baler, Aurora			Autonomous (by legislation)
University of the Philippines- Manila School of Health Sciences Extension Campus-Tarlac	SUC Satellite	San Isidro, Tarlac			Autonomous (by legislation)

=== Private ===
Name	Location	Year established	Year granted university status	Regulation status
Angeles University Foundation	Angeles City	1962	1971	Autonomous (by evaluation)
Araullo University	Cabanatuan	1950	1983	Regulated
Baliuag University	Gil Carlos Street, Baliwag	1925	2001	Autonomous (by evaluation)
Centro Escolar University-Malolos City	Km. 44, Mac Arthur, Malolos, Bulacan	1978	not applicable	Autonomous (by evaluation)
Colegio de San Juan de Letran-Bataan	Abucay, Bataan	2000	not applicable	Regulated
College of Our Lady of Mt. Carmel (Pampanga)	San Fernando, Pampanga		not applicable	Regulated
Holy Angel University	Sto. Rosario Street, Angeles City	1933	1981	Autonomous (by evaluation)
La Consolacion University Philippines	Malolos	1937	1997	Deregulated (by evaluation)
Meycauayan College	Meycauayan	1925	not applicable	Regulated
National University-Baliwag	Baliwag	2021	not applicable	Regulated
Our Lady of Fatima University-Nueva Ecija	Cabanatuan, Nueva Ecija	1970 (as NEDCI)	not applicable	Regulated
Our Lady of Fatima University-Pampanga	San Fernando, Pampanga	1945 (as ECC)	not applicable	Regulated
University of the Assumption	San Fernando, Pampanga	1963	1980	Regulated
Wesleyan University-Philippines (Cabanatuan)	Mabini Extension, Cabanatuan	1946	1978	Regulated
ABE International Business College-Cabanatuan	Cabanatuan		not applicable	Regulated
ABE International Business College-Malolos	Malolos		not applicable	Regulated
Academia de San Lorenzo Dema Ala	San Jose del Monte	1995	not applicable	Regulated
ACLC College of Apalit	Apalit		not applicable	Regulated
ACLC College of Balanga	Balanga, Bataan		not applicable	Regulated
ACLC College-Baliuag	Baliwag		not applicable	Regulated
ACLC College of Mabalacat	Mabalacat		not applicable	Regulated
ACLC College of Malolos	Malolos		not applicable	Regulated
ACLC College of Meycauayan	Meycauayan		not applicable	Regulated
ACLC College of Sta. Maria	Santa Maria, Bulacan		not applicable	Regulated
AMA Computer College-Angeles City	Angeles City		not applicable	Regulated
AMA Computer College-Cabanatuan City	Cabanatuan		not applicable	Regulated
AMA Computer College-Malolos	Malolos		not applicable	Regulated
AMA Computer College-Olongapo City	Olongapo		not applicable	Regulated
AMA Computer College-San Fernando, Pampanga	San Fernando, Pampanga		not applicable	Regulated
AMA Computer College-Tarlac City	Tarlac City		not applicable	Regulated
Araullo University-San Jose Campus	San Jose, Nueva Ecija		not applicable	Regulated
Araullo University-South Campus	Cabanatuan, Nueva Ecija	2014	not applicable	Regulated
Asian Institute of Science and Technology-Central	Mabalacat, Pampanga	2014	not applicable	Regulated
Asia Pacific College of Advanced Studies	Balanga, Bataan	1999	not applicable	Regulated
Aurora Polytechnic College	Baler, Aurora	2010	not applicable	Regulated
Baliwag Maritime Academy, Inc.	San Rafael, Bulacan	1994	not applicable	Regulated
Bataan Heroes Memorial College	Balanga, Bataan	1979	not applicable	Regulated
BESTCAP Career College	Camiling	1998	not applicable	Regulated
Bestlink College of the Philippines-Bulacan	San Jose del Monte	2013	not applicable	Regulated
Camiling Colleges	Camiling	1946	not applicable	Regulated
Carthel Science Educational Foundation	San Manuel, Tarlac	1987	not applicable	Regulated
CIT Colleges of Paniqui Foundation	Paniqui	1945	not applicable	Regulated
Central Luzon College of Science and Technology-Olongapo	Olongapo, Zambales	1959	not applicable	Regulated
Central Luzon College of Science and Technology-Pampanga	San Fernando, Pampanga	1959	not applicable	Regulated
Central Luzon Doctors' Hospital Educational Institution	Tarlac City	1976	not applicable	Regulated
Central Luzon College of Science and Technology-Olongapo City	Olongapo	1970	not applicable	Regulated
Centro Colegio De Tarlac	Bamban, Tarlac		not applicable	Regulated
Clark College of Science and Technology	Mabalacat	2005	not applicable	Regulated
Colegio de Calumpit	Calumpit	1947	not applicable	Regulated
Colegio San Agustin	San Jose del Monte, Bulacan		not applicable	Regulated
Colegio de San Gabriel Arcangel	San Jose del Monte, Bulacan	1993	not applicable	Regulated
Colegio de San Pascual Baylon	Obando, Bulacan	1913	not applicable	Regulated
Colegio de Sebastian-Pampanga	San Fernando, Pampanga		not applicable	Regulated
College of Mary Immaculate of Pandi Bulacan	Pandi, Bulacan		not applicable	Regulated
College of Saint Anthony-SJDM Bulacan	San Jose del Monte	2008	not applicable	Regulated
College of Saint Lawrence	Balagtas, Bulacan		not applicable	Regulated
College of Subic Montesorri-Dinalupihan	Dinalupihan		not applicable	Regulated
College of Subic Montessori-Subic Bay	Olongapo		not applicable	Regulated
College of the Holy Spirit of Tarlac	Tarlac City	1939	not applicable	Regulated
College of the Immaculate Conception	Cabanatuan	1926	not applicable	Regulated
Colleges of Advance Technology and Management of the Philippines	Guimba		not applicable	Regulated
Core Gateway College	San Jose, Nueva Ecija	1948	not applicable	Regulated
Columban College-Olongapo City	Olongapo		not applicable	Regulated
Columban College-Sta. Cruz Zambales	Sta. Cruz, Zambales		not applicable	Regulated
College for Research and Technology-Cabanatuan City	Cabanatuan		not applicable	Regulated
College of Our Lady of Mercy of Pulilan	Pulilan		not applicable	Regulated
College of Our Lady of Mt. Carmel (Pampanga)	San Fernando, Pampanga		not applicable	Regulated
College of the Most Holy Trinity	Hermosa, Bataan		not applicable	Regulated
Comteq Computer and Business College	Olongapo		not applicable	Regulated
Concepcion Holy Cross College	Concepcion, Tarlac		not applicable	Regulated
Divina Pastora College	Gapan		not applicable	Regulated
Dominican College of Tarlac	Capas		not applicable	Regulated
Dr. Gloria D. Lacson Foundation Colleges-Cabanatuan City	Cabanatuan		not applicable	Regulated
Dr. Gloria D. Lacson Foundation Colleges-Nueva Ecija	San Leonardo, Nueva Ecija		not applicable	Regulated
Dr. Yanga's Colleges	Bocaue, Bulacan		not applicable	Regulated
Eastwoods Professional College of Science and Technology	Balanga, Bataan		not applicable	Regulated
Emmanuel System College of Bulacan	Pulilan		not applicable	Regulated
Erhard Science College-Bulacan	San Rafael, Bulacan		not applicable	Regulated
Exact Colleges of Asia	Arayat, Pampanga		not applicable	Regulated
FDSA Aviation College of Science and Technology	Mabalacat		not applicable	Regulated
Fernandez College of Arts and Technology	Baliwag		not applicable	Regulated
First City Providential College	San Jose del Monte, Bulacan		not applicable	Autonomous (by evaluation)
Fundamental Baptist College For Asians	Tarlac City		not applicable	Regulated
General de Jesus College	San Isidro, Nueva Ecija		not applicable	Regulated
Gerona Junior College	Gerona, Tarlac		not applicable	Regulated
Golden Olympus College	Tarlac City		not applicable	Regulated
Golden Valley Colleges	San Jose del Monte		not applicable	Regulated
The Good Samaritan Colleges	Cabanatuan	1973	not applicable	Regulated
Guagua National Colleges	Guagua	1918	not applicable	Regulated
Holy Cross College-Nueva Ecija	Santa Rosa, Nueva Ecija	1946	not applicable	Regulated
Holy Cross College-Pampanga	Sta. Ana, Pampanga	1946	not applicable	Regulated
Holy Rosary Colleges Foundation	San Isidro, Nueva Ecija	1988	not applicable	Regulated
Immaculate Conception I-College of Arts and Technology	Santa Maria, Bulacan	2008	not applicable	Regulated
Immaculate Conception Major Seminary	Guiguinto	1983	not applicable	Regulated
Interworld College of Technology Foundation-Tarlac	Tarlac City		not applicable	Regulated
Interworld Colleges Foundation - Paniqui	Paniqui		not applicable	Regulated
Javier E. Garde Essential Colleges	Bongabon		not applicable	Regulated
Jesus Is Lord Colleges Foundation	Bocaue		not applicable	Regulated
Jocson College	Angeles City		not applicable	Regulated
Jose C. Feliciano College Foundation	Mabalacat		not applicable	Regulated
Kinect Academy	Gapan		not applicable	Regulated
La Concepcion College	San Jose del Monte		not applicable	Regulated
La Fortuna College	Cabanatuan		not applicable	Regulated
La Verdad Christian College	Apalit		not applicable	Regulated
Liceo de Pulilan Colleges	Pulilan		not applicable	Regulated
Lourdes College of Bulacan	Angat, Bulacan		not applicable	Regulated
Lyceum of Subic Bay	Olongapo		not applicable	Regulated
Lyceum of the East-Aurora	Maria Aurora, Aurora		not applicable	Regulated
Lyceum of Western Luzon - Zambales	Botolan		not applicable	Regulated
Magsaysay Memorial College of Zambales	San Narciso, Zambales		not applicable	Regulated
Manuel V. Gallego Foundation Colleges	Cabanatuan		not applicable	Regulated
Maria Assumpta Seminary	Cabanatuan		not applicable	Regulated
Marian College of Baliuag	Baliwag		not applicable	Regulated
Maritime Academy of Asia and the Pacific	Mariveles, Bataan		not applicable	Regulated
Marymount Professional Colleges	Meycauayan		not applicable	Regulated
Mary the Queen College-Pampanga	Guagua		not applicable	Regulated
Mater Dei Academy - Sta. Maria	Santa Maria, Bulacan		not applicable	Regulated
Mater Redemptoris College of San Jose City	San Jose, Nueva Ecija		not applicable	Regulated
Megabyte College of Science and Technology-Florida	Floridablanca, Pampanga		not applicable	Regulated
Metro Subic Colleges	Olongapo		not applicable	Regulated
Micro Asia College of Science and Technology	Iba, Zambales		not applicable	Regulated
Microcity College of Business and Technology	Balanga, Bataan		not applicable	Regulated
Microlink Institute of Science and Technology San Rafael Campus	San Rafael, Bulacan		not applicable	Regulated
MIDWAY COLLEGES Inc.	Cabanatuan		not applicable	Regulated
Mondriaan Aura College	Olongapo		not applicable	Regulated
Mother of Good Counsel Seminary	San Fernando, Pampanga		not applicable	Regulated
Mount Carmel College-Baler	Baler, Aurora		not applicable	Regulated
Mt. Carmel College of Bocaue Bulacan	Bocaue		not applicable	Regulated
Mount Carmel College of Casiguran	Casiguran, Aurora		not applicable	Regulated
Nazarenus College and Hospital Foundation	Meycauayan		not applicable	Regulated
New Era University-Pampanga	San Fernando, Pampanga			Regulated
Northern Zambales College	Masinloc, Zambales		not applicable	Regulated
Nueva Ecija Doctors' Colleges	Cabanatuan		not applicable	Regulated
OLRA College Foundation	San Manuel, Tarlac		not applicable	Regulated
Osias Colleges	Tarlac City		not applicable	Regulated
Our Lady of Manaoag Montessori College	Balagtas, Bulacan		not applicable	Regulated
Our Lady of Peace College Seminary	Tarlac City		not applicable	Regulated
Our Lady of Sacred Heart College of Guimba	Guimba		not applicable	Regulated
Pampanga Colleges	Macabebe, Pampanga		not applicable	Regulated
Philippine Rehabilitation Institute Foundation-Guagua	Guagua		not applicable	Regulated
Philippine Women`s University CDCEC-Bataan	Balanga, Bataan			Regulated
Philippine Women`s University CDCEC-Tarlac	Tarlac City			Regulated
RCC Colegio de San Rafael	San Fernando, Pampanga		not applicable	Regulated
Republic Central Colleges	Angeles City	1946	not applicable	Regulated
Richwell Colleges	Plaridel, Bulacan		not applicable	Regulated
Sacred Heart Academy of Sta. Maria Bulacan	Santa Maria, Bulacan		not applicable	Regulated
Sact Mutien College	Mabalacat		not applicable	Regulated
Saint Anthony College of Technology	Mabalacat		not applicable	Regulated
Saint Augustine Colleges Foundation	Paniqui		not applicable	Regulated
St. Benilde Center for Global Competence	Olongapo		not applicable	Regulated
St. Elizabeth Global Skills Institute	Talavera, Nueva Ecija		not applicable	Regulated
St. Joseph's College of Balanga City	Balanga, Bataan		not applicable	Regulated
St. Joseph College-Olongapo	Olongapo		not applicable	Regulated
Saint Mary's Angels College of Pampanga	Sta. Ana, Pampanga		not applicable	Regulated
Saint Mary's College of Baliuag	Baliwag		not applicable	Regulated
Saint Mary's College of Meycauayan	Meycauayan		not applicable	Regulated
St. Nicolas College of Business and Technology	San Fernando, Pampanga		not applicable	Regulated
St. Paul Colleges Foundation-Paniqui Tarlac	Paniqui		not applicable	Regulated
St. Paul University at San Miguel	San Miguel, Bulacan			Regulated
Saint Rose College Educational Foundation	Paniqui		not applicable	Regulated
St. Thomas More College-Clark	Angeles City		not applicable	Regulated
Santa Rita College of Pampanga	Santa Rita, Pampanga		not applicable	Regulated
San Jose Christian Colleges	San Jose, Nueva Ecija		not applicable	Regulated
SJDM Cornerstone College	San Jose del Monte		not applicable	Regulated
Sto. Rosario Sapang Palay College	San Jose del Monte		not applicable	Regulated
Siena College of San Jose	San Jose del Monte		not applicable	Regulated
STI College-Angeles City	Angeles City		not applicable	Regulated
STI College-Balagtas	Balagtas, Bulacan		not applicable	Regulated
STI College-Baliuag	Baliwag		not applicable	Regulated
STI College-Malolos	Malolos		not applicable	Regulated
STI College-Meycauayan	Meycauayan		not applicable	Regulated
STI College-City of San Fernando	San Fernando, Pampanga		not applicable	Regulated
STI College San Jose Del Monte	San Jose del Monte		not applicable	Regulated
STI College San Jose	San Jose, Nueva Ecija		not applicable	Regulated
STI College-Sta. Maria	Santa Maria, Bulacan		not applicable	Regulated
STI College-Tarlac City	Tarlac City		not applicable	Regulated
Subic Bay Colleges	Olongapo		not applicable	Regulated
Systems Plus College Foundation	Angeles City		not applicable	Regulated
Tarlac Christian Colleges	Tarlac City		not applicable	Regulated
The Manila Times College of Subic	Olongapo		not applicable	Regulated
Tomas Del Rosario College	Balanga, Bataan		not applicable	Regulated
United School of Science and Technology Colleges	Tarlac City		not applicable	Regulated
University of Nueva Caceres-Bataan	Dinalupihan			Regulated
Village Montessori School & Colleges	San Jose del Monte, Bulacan	1983	not applicable	Regulated
Virgen Milagrosa Del Rosario College Seminary	Balanga, Bataan		not applicable	Regulated
Wesleyan University-Philippines-Aurora	Maria Aurora, Aurora			Regulated
World Citi Colleges Guimba Campus	Guimba		not applicable	Regulated

== Calabarzon ==
=== Government ===
Name	Type	Location	Year established	Year granted university status	Regulation status
Balian Community College	LUC	Pangil		not applicable	Regulated
Kolehiyo ng Lungsod ng Lipa	LUC	Lipa, Batangas		not applicable	Regulated
Dalubhasaan ng Lungsod ng San Pablo	LUC	San Pablo, Laguna		not applicable	Regulated
Dalubhasaan ng Lungsod ng Lucena	LUC	Lucena		not applicable	Regulated
Pamantasan ng Cabuyao	LUC	Cabuyao		not applicable	Regulated
Colegio de Montalban	LUC	Rodriguez, Rizal		not applicable	Regulated
Pambayang Kolehiyo ng Mauban	LUC	Mauban		not applicable	Regulated
City College of Calamba	LUC	Calamba, Laguna		not applicable	Regulated
Laguna University	LUC	Sta. Cruz, Laguna			Regulated
Colegio ng Lungsod ng Batangas	LUC	Batangas City		not applicable	Regulated
City College of Tagaytay	LUC	Tagaytay		not applicable	Regulated
San Mateo Municipal College	LUC	San Mateo, Rizal		not applicable	Regulated
Trece Martires City College	LUC	Trece Martires		not applicable	Regulated
Antipolo Institute of Technology	LUC	Antipolo		not applicable	Regulated
Tanauan City College	LUC	Tanauan, Batangas		not applicable	Regulated
One Cainta College	LUC	Cainta		not applicable	Regulated
Kolehiyo ng Lungsod ng Dasmariñas	LUC	Dasmariñas	2021	not applicable	Regulated
Colegio de La Ciudad de Tayabas	LUC	Tayabas		not applicable	Regulated
Philippine National Police Academy	OGS	Silang, Cavite		not applicable	
Cavite State University-Main	SUC Main	Indang, Cavite			Regulated
Laguna State Polytechnic University-Main	SUC Main	Siniloan, Laguna			Regulated
Batangas State University-Main	SUC Main	Batangas City			Regulated
University of Rizal System-Tanay	SUC Main	Tanay, Rizal			Regulated
Southern Luzon State University	SUC Main	Lucban			Regulated
Batangas State University-Nasugbu	SUC Satellite	Nasugbu			Regulated
Cavite State University-CCAT (Rosario) Campus	SUC Satellite	Rosario, Cavite			Regulated
Cavite State University-Naic Campus	SUC Satellite	Naic			Regulated
Laguna State Polytechnic University-Sta. Cruz	SUC Satellite	Sta. Cruz, Laguna			Regulated
Laguna State Polytechnic University-Los Baños	SUC Satellite	Los Baños, Laguna			Regulated
Batangas State University-Balayan	SUC Satellite	Balayan			Regulated
Batangas State University-Lipa City	SUC Satellite	Lipa, Batangas			Regulated
Batangas State University-Lobo	SUC Satellite	Lobo, Batangas			Regulated
Batangas State University-Rosario	SUC Satellite	Rosario, Batangas			Regulated
Batangas State University-San Juan	SUC Satellite	San Juan, Batangas			Regulated
Philippine Normal University-Lopez	SUC Satellite	Lopez, Quezon			Regulated
Philippine State College of Aeronautics-Fernando Air Base	SUC Satellite	Lipa, Batangas		not applicable	Regulated
Polytechnic University of the Philippines-Lopez	SUC Satellite	Lopez, Quezon			Regulated
Polytechnic University of the Philippines-Maragondon	SUC Satellite	Maragondon, Cavite			Regulated
Polytechnic University of the Philippines-Unisan	SUC Satellite	Unisan, Quezon			Regulated
University of Rizal System-Morong	SUC Satellite	Morong, Rizal			Regulated
Laguna State Polytechnic University-San Pablo City	SUC Satellite	San Pablo, Laguna			Regulated
Technological University of the Philippines-Cavite	SUC Satellite	Dasmariñas			Regulated
University of the Philippines Los Baños	Constituent university of the national university system	Los Baños, Laguna	1909 as the University of the Philippines College of Agriculture (UPCA); 1972 as an autonomous unit	1972 as a constituent university	Autonomous (by legislation)
University of the Philippines Open University	Constituent university of the national university system	Los Baños, Laguna	1995	1995 as a constituent university	Autonomous (by legislation)
Batangas State University-Malvar	SUC Satellite	Malvar, Batangas			Regulated
Polytechnic University of the Philippines-Sto. Tomas	SUC Satellite	Sto. Tomas, Batangas			Regulated
Polytechnic University of the Philippines-Mulanay	SUC Satellite	Mulanay			Regulated
Southern Luzon State University-Tagkawayan	SUC Satellite	Tagkawayan			Regulated
University of Rizal System-Angono	SUC Satellite	Angono			Regulated
University of Rizal System-Pililia	SUC Satellite	Pililia			Regulated
University of Rizal System-Rodriguez	SUC Satellite	Rodriguez, Rizal			Regulated
Southern Luzon State University-Infanta	SUC Satellite	Infanta, Quezon			Regulated
Southern Luzon State University-Alabat	SUC Satellite	Alabat, Quezon			Regulated
Southern Luzon State University-Lucena	SUC Satellite	Lucena			Regulated
Southern Luzon State University-Polilio	SUC Satellite	Polillo, Quezon			Regulated
University of Rizal System-Binangonan	SUC Satellite	Binangonan			Regulated
Cavite State University-Cavite City Camous	SUC Satellite	Cavite City			Regulated
University of Rizal System-Cainta	SUC Satellite	Cainta			Regulated
University of Rizal System-Cardona	SUC Satellite	Cardona, Rizal			Regulated
University of Rizal System-Antipolo	SUC Satellite	Antipolo			Regulated
Batangas State University-Lemery	SUC Satellite	Lemery, Batangas			Regulated
Cavite State University-Carmona Campus	SUC Satellite	Carmona, Cavite			Regulated
Cavite State University-Imus Campus	SUC Satellite	Imus			Regulated
Cavite State University-Trece Martires City Campus	SUC Satellite	Trece Martires			Regulated
Cavite State University-Silang Campus	SUC Satellite	Silang, Cavite			Regulated
Batangas State University-Alangilan	SUC Satellite	Batangas City			Regulated
University of Rizal System-Taytay	SUC Satellite	Taytay, Rizal			Regulated
Southern Luzon State University-Tiaong Campus	SUC Satellite	Tiaong			Regulated
Cavite State University-Tanza Campus	SUC Satellite	Tanza, Cavite			Regulated
Cavite State University-Bacoor City Campus	SUC Satellite	Bacoor			Regulated
Cavite State University-General Trias Campus	SUC Satellite	General Trias			Regulated
Southern Luzon State University-Gumaca Campus	SUC Satellite	Gumaca			Regulated
Southern Luzon State University-Catanauan	SUC Satellite	Catanauan		not applicable	Regulated
Batangas State University-Mabini	SUC Satellite	Mabini, Batangas		not applicable	Regulated
Southern Luzon State University-Tayabas	SUC Satellite	Tayabas		not applicable	Regulated
Eulogio "Amang" Rodriguez Institute of Science and Technology-Cavite	SUC Satellite	General Mariano Alvarez		not applicable	Regulated
Polytechnic University of the Philippines-San Pedro	SUC Satellite	San Pedro, Laguna			Regulated
Polytechnic University of the Philippines-Sta. Rosa	SUC Satellite	Sta. Rosa, Laguna			Regulated
Polytechnic University of the Philippines-Calauan	SUC Satellite	Calauan			Regulated
Polytechnic University of the Philippines-Biñan	SUC Satellite	Biñan			Regulated
Polytechnic University of the Philippines-General Luna Quezon	SUC Satellite	General Luna, Quezon			Regulated
Polytechnic University of the Philippines-Alfonso	SUC Satellite	Alfonso, Cavite			Regulated

=== Private ===
Name	Location	Year established	Year granted university status	Regulation status
ACTS Computer College	Sta. Cruz, Laguna		not applicable	Regulated
Asia-Pacific Nazarene Theological Seminary	Taytay, Rizal		not applicable	Regulated
Calauag Central College	Calauag		not applicable	Regulated
Canossa College	San Pablo, Laguna		not applicable	Regulated
Colegio de Los Baños	Los Baños, Laguna		not applicable	Regulated
Colegio de San Juan de Letran-Calamba	Calamba, Laguna		not applicable	Autonomous (by evaluation)
De La Salle - Lipa	Lipa, Batangas		not applicable	Regulated
Deaf Evangelistic Alliance Foundation	Cavinti		not applicable	Regulated
Divine Word Seminary-Tagaytay	Tagaytay		not applicable	Regulated
De La Salle University-Dasmariñas	Bagong Bayan, Dasmariñas			Autonomous (by evaluation)
De La Salle Health Sciences Institute	Dasmariñas		not applicable	Autonomous (by evaluation)
Don Bosco College-Canlubang	Calamba, Laguna		not applicable	Regulated
Paete Science and Business College	Paete, Laguna		not applicable	Regulated
Eastern Quezon College	Gumaca		not applicable	Regulated
Eastern Tayabas College	Lopez, Quezon		not applicable	Regulated
Golden Gate Colleges	Batangas City		not applicable	Regulated
Harris Memorial College	Taytay, Rizal		not applicable	Regulated
Immaculate Conception College-Balayan	Balayan		not applicable	Regulated
Imus Institute of Science and Technology	Imus		not applicable	Regulated
ICCT Colleges Foundation	Cainta		not applicable	Regulated
Dr. Francisco L. Calingasan Memorial Colleges Foundation	Nasugbu		not applicable	Regulated
Laguna College	San Pablo, Laguna		not applicable	Regulated
Laguna College of Business and Arts	Calamba, Laguna		not applicable	Regulated
Laguna Northwestern College	San Pedro, Laguna		not applicable	Regulated
Leon Guinto Memorial College	Atimonan		not applicable	Regulated
Lipa City Colleges	Lipa, Batangas		not applicable	Regulated
Lyceum of the Philippines University-Batangas	Capitol Site, Batangas City			Autonomous (by evaluation)
Manuel S. Enverga University Foundation-Lucena	University Site, Lucena			Autonomous (by evaluation)
Marcelino Fule Memorial College	Alaminos, Laguna		not applicable	Regulated
Calayan Educational Foundation	Lucena		not applicable	Regulated
Manuel S. Enverga University Foundation-Candelaria	Candelaria, Quezon			Regulated
Manuel S. Enverga University Foundation-Catanauan	Catanauan			Regulated
National College of Business and Arts-Taytay	Taytay, Rizal		not applicable	Regulated
Northern Quezon College	Infanta, Quezon		not applicable	Regulated
Our Lady of Lourdes Seminary	Lipa, Batangas		not applicable	Regulated
University of Perpetual Help System-Laguna	Sto. Niño, Biñan			Autonomous (by evaluation)
University of Perpetual Help System-Dr. Jose G. Tamayo Medical University	Biñan			Regulated
Adventist University of the Philippines	Puting Kahoy, Silang, Cavite			Regulated
PTS College and Advanced Studies	Dasmariñas		not applicable	Regulated
Quezonian Educational College	Atimonan		not applicable	Regulated
Rizal College of Taal	Taal, Batangas		not applicable	Regulated
Rizal College of Laguna	Calamba, Laguna		not applicable	Regulated
FEU Roosevelt - Cainta	Cainta		not applicable	Regulated
Sacred Heart College	Lucena		not applicable	Regulated
St. Anne College Lucena	Lucena		not applicable	Regulated
St. Bridget College	Batangas City		not applicable	Regulated
St. Francis de Sales Major Seminary	Lipa, Batangas		not applicable	Regulated
St. Joseph College of Cavite	Cavite City		not applicable	Regulated
St. Louis Anne Colleges of San Pedro Laguna	San Pedro, Laguna		not applicable	Regulated
Saint Michael's College of Laguna	Platero, Biñan		not applicable	Regulated
Saint Paul Seminary	Silang, Cavite		not applicable	Regulated
St. Peter's College Seminary	San Pablo, Laguna		not applicable	Regulated
San Antonio de Padua College	Pila, Laguna		not applicable	Regulated
San Ildefonso College	Tanay, Rizal		not applicable	Regulated
San Pablo Colleges	San Pablo, Laguna		not applicable	Regulated
San Pedro College of Business Administration	San Pedro, Laguna		not applicable	Regulated
San Sebastian College-Recoletos de Cavite	Cavite City		not applicable	Regulated
Siena College of Taytay	Taytay, Rizal		not applicable	Regulated
Southeast Asia Interdisciplinary Development Institute	Antipolo		not applicable	Regulated
Tanauan Institute	Tanauan, Batangas		not applicable	Regulated
Tayabas Western Academy	Candelaria, Quezon		not applicable	Regulated
Tomas Claudio Colleges	Morong, Rizal		not applicable	Regulated
Unciano Colleges	Antipolo		not applicable	Regulated
Union College of Laguna	Sta. Cruz, Laguna		not applicable	Regulated
Western Colleges	Naic		not applicable	Regulated
University of Batangas	Batangas City			Autonomous (by evaluation)
STI College-Lucena	Lucena		not applicable	Regulated
University of Perpetual Help System Dalta-Molino Campus	Bacoor			Deregulated (by evaluation)
STI College-San Pablo	San Pablo, Laguna		not applicable	Regulated
STI College-Calamba Campus	Calamba, Laguna		not applicable	Regulated
Dominican College of Sta. Rosa	Sta. Rosa, Laguna		not applicable	Regulated
Saints John and Paul Educational Foundation	Calamba, Laguna		not applicable	Regulated
Sta. Teresa College	Bauan		not applicable	Regulated
STI College-Bacoor	Bacoor		not applicable	Regulated
STI College-Batangas	Batangas City		not applicable	Regulated
STI College-Sta. Cruz	Sta. Cruz, Laguna		not applicable	Regulated
STI College-Lipa	Lipa, Batangas		not applicable	Regulated
Trace College	Los Baños, Laguna		not applicable	Regulated
STI College-Southwoods	Carmona, Cavite		not applicable	Regulated
AMA Computer College-Biñan	Biñan		not applicable	Regulated
Colegio De San Pedro	San Pedro, Laguna		not applicable	Regulated
La Consolacion College-Biñan	Biñan		not applicable	Regulated
Laguna Science and Technology College	San Pedro, Laguna		not applicable	Regulated
Mt. St. Aloysius College Seminary	Gumaca		not applicable	Regulated
Cainta Catholic College	Cainta		not applicable	Regulated
STI College-Cainta	Cainta		not applicable	Regulated
Maryhill College	Lucena		not applicable	Regulated
University of Perpetual Help System-GMA Campus	General Mariano Alvarez			Regulated
Philippine Missionary Institute	Silang, Cavite		not applicable	Regulated
Lemery Colleges	Lemery, Batangas		not applicable	Regulated
AMA Computer College-Sta.Cruz	Sta. Cruz, Laguna		not applicable	Regulated
Colegio San Agustin-Biñan	Biñan		not applicable	Regulated
AMA Computer College-East Rizal	Antipolo		not applicable	Regulated
Oblates of Saint Joseph College of Philosophy	Lipa, Batangas		not applicable	Regulated
Inter-Global College Foundation	Lucena		not applicable	Regulated
University of Perpetual Help System Dalta-Calamba	Calamba, Laguna			Deregulated (by evaluation)
St. Alphonsus School of Theology	Lucena		not applicable	Regulated
IETI College of Science and Technology	San Pedro, Laguna		not applicable	Regulated
Adventist International Institute of Advanced Studies	Silang, Cavite		not applicable	Regulated
Binangonan Catholic College	Binangonan		not applicable	Regulated
AMA Computer College-Dasmariñas	Dasmariñas		not applicable	Regulated
AMA Computer College-Batangas City	Batangas City		not applicable	Regulated
Montessori Professional Colleges of Asia	Antipolo		not applicable	Regulated
Emilio Aguinaldo Educational Corporation-Emilio Aguinaldo College	Dasmariñas		not applicable	Regulated
Alitagtag College	Alitagtag		not applicable	Regulated
AMA Computer College-Lipa City	Lipa, Batangas		not applicable	Regulated
National College of Science and Technology	Dasmariñas		not applicable	Regulated
Rogationist College	Silang, Cavite		not applicable	Regulated
Saint John Colleges	Calamba, Laguna		not applicable	Regulated
AMA Computer College-Calamba Campus	Calamba, Laguna		not applicable	Regulated
AMA Computer College-Lucena	Lucena		not applicable	Regulated
Cavite West Point College	Ternate, Cavite		not applicable	Regulated
Our Lady of Assumption College of Laguna	San Pedro, Laguna		not applicable	Regulated
Southern Philippines Institute of Science and Technology	Imus		not applicable	Regulated
St. Matthew College	San Mateo, Rizal		not applicable	Regulated
World Citi Colleges-Antipolo City	Antipolo		not applicable	Regulated
ABE International Business College-Cainta	Cainta		not applicable	Regulated
First Asia Institute of Technology and Humanities	Tanauan, Batangas		not applicable	Regulated
Holy Child Jesus College	Gumaca		not applicable	Regulated
Lyceum of the Philippines-Laguna	Calamba, Laguna		not applicable	Autonomous (by evaluation)
St. Jude College-Dasmariñas	Dasmariñas		not applicable	Regulated
Saint Francis Institute of Computer Studies	San Pedro, Laguna		not applicable	Regulated
Lyceum of the Philippines University-St. Cabrini School of Health Sciences	Calamba, Laguna			Regulated
Baptist Bible Seminary and Institute	Taytay, Rizal		not applicable	Regulated
Baptist Voice Bible College	Lucena		not applicable	Regulated
Calamba Doctors' College	Calamba, Laguna		not applicable	Regulated
LNC Corinthian Center	Sta. Rosa, Laguna		not applicable	Regulated
STI College-Rosario	Rosario, Cavite		not applicable	Regulated
Unida Christian Colleges	Imus		not applicable	Regulated
Casa Del Niño College	San Pedro, Laguna		not applicable	Regulated
Mabini College of Batangas	Mabini, Batangas		not applicable	Regulated
STI College-Balayan	Balayan		not applicable	Regulated
STI College-Sta. Rosa	Sta. Rosa, Laguna		not applicable	Regulated
La Consolacion College-Tanauan	Tanauan, Batangas		not applicable	Regulated
DMMC Institute of Health Sciences	Tanauan, Batangas		not applicable	Regulated
Saint Francis of Assisi College-Cavite	Bacoor		not applicable	Regulated
Olivarez College-Tagaytay	Tagaytay		not applicable	Regulated
St. Dominic College of Asia	Bacoor		not applicable	Deregulated (by evaluation)
Power School of Technology	Tanza, Cavite		not applicable	Regulated
Philippine Women's University-Career Development and Continuing Education Center-Calamba City	Calamba, Laguna			Regulated
Our Lady of the Most Holy Rosary Seminary	Lucban		not applicable	Regulated
Batangas Eastern Colleges	San Juan, Batangas		not applicable	Regulated
Ebenezer International Colleges	General Trias		not applicable	Regulated
Southdale International School of Science Arts and Technology	Imus		not applicable	Regulated
ISHRM School System	Bacoor		not applicable	Regulated
STI College-Dasmariñas	Dasmariñas		not applicable	Regulated
Quezon Center for Research and Studies-Institute of Management	Lucena		not applicable	Regulated
St. Francis de Sales Theological Seminary	Lipa, Batangas		not applicable	Regulated
Informatics International College-Cainta	Cainta		not applicable	Regulated
PNTC Colleges	Dasmariñas		not applicable	Regulated
International Peace Leadership College	Tanay, Rizal		not applicable	Regulated
STI College-Tanauan	Tanauan, Batangas		not applicable	Regulated
Philippine Women's University-Career Development and Continuing Education Center-Sta. Cruz	Sta. Cruz, Laguna			Regulated
Manuel S. Enverga Institute Foundation-San Antonio	San Antonio, Quezon		not applicable	Regulated
All Nations College	Antipolo		not applicable	Regulated
International Christian College of Manila	Antipolo		not applicable	Regulated
Philippine International College	Antipolo		not applicable	Regulated
Montessori Professional Colleges of Asia-Imus	Imus		not applicable	Regulated
Teodoro M. Luansing College of Rosario	Rosario, Batangas		not applicable	Regulated
Our Lady of Assumption College-Cabuyao	Cabuyao		not applicable	Regulated
Skill Power Institute	Antipolo		not applicable	Regulated
Oxfordian Colleges	Dasmariñas		not applicable	Regulated
CVE Colleges	Pagbilao, Quezon		not applicable	Regulated
San Sebastian College Recoletos-Canlubang	Calamba, Laguna		not applicable	Regulated
Westmead International School	Batangas City		not applicable	Regulated
Agoncillo College	Agoncillo, Batangas		not applicable	Regulated
Colegio de Amore	Trece Martires		not applicable	Regulated
Far Eastern Polytechnic College	Dasmariñas		not applicable	Regulated
Immanuel Theological Seminary	Dasmariñas		not applicable	Regulated
Batangas College of Arts and Sciences	Lipa, Batangas		not applicable	Regulated
Malayan Colleges of Laguna	Cabuyao		not applicable	Autonomous (by evaluation)
NYK-TDG Maritime Academy	Calamba, Laguna		not applicable	Regulated
Brookfield College in Cavite	Dasmariñas		not applicable	Regulated
Sumulong College of Arts and Sciences	Antipolo		not applicable	Regulated
St. Vincent College of Cabuyao	Cabuyao		not applicable	Regulated
Our Lady of Fatima University-Antipolo	Antipolo			Regulated
STI College-Tanay	Tanay, Rizal		not applicable	Regulated
Lyceum of the Philippines-Cavite Campus	General Trias		not applicable	Regulated
Asian Institute of Technology and Education-Tiaong Campus	Tiaong		not applicable	Regulated
Philippine Best Training Systems Colleges	Binangonan		not applicable	Regulated
St. Joseph's College of Rodriguez	Rodriguez, Rizal		not applicable	Regulated
College of San Benildo-Rizal	Antipolo		not applicable	Regulated
Colegio de Porta Vaga	Imus		not applicable	Regulated
STI College-Tagaytay	Tagaytay		not applicable	Regulated
Colegio de Santo Cristo de Burgos	Sariaya		not applicable	Regulated
FEU Cavite	Silang, Cavite		not applicable	Regulated
East Systems College of Rizal	Morong, Rizal		not applicable	Regulated
Alpha Centauri Educational System	Lucena		not applicable	Regulated
Asian School of Hospitality Arts	Antipolo		not applicable	Regulated
Laguna Northwestern College-SLRMC	Siniloan, Laguna		not applicable	Regulated
Trimex Colleges	Biñan		not applicable	Regulated
Granby Colleges of Science & Technology	Naic		not applicable	Regulated
Kurios Christian Colleges Foundation	Magallanes, Cavite		not applicable	Regulated
ABE International Business College-Quezon Province	Lucena		not applicable	Regulated
Acts Computer College-Infanta	Infanta, Quezon		not applicable	Regulated
Asia-Pacific Christian College and Seminary	Rodriguez, Rizal		not applicable	Regulated
Asia Technological School of Science and Arts	Sta. Rosa, Laguna		not applicable	Regulated
CSTC College of Sciences Technology and Communications	Sariaya		not applicable	Regulated
Evangelical Theological College of the Philippines-Luzon	Cainta		not applicable	Regulated
Guinayangan College Foundation	Guinayangan		not applicable	Regulated
ICCT Colleges Foundation-Antipolo	Antipolo		not applicable	Regulated
ICCT Colleges Foundation-San Mateo	San Mateo, Rizal		not applicable	Regulated
Jesus Reigns Christian College Foundation-Amadeo	Amadeo, Cavite		not applicable	Regulated
Laguna Maritime Arts and Business Colleges	Pangil		not applicable	Regulated
Mary Help of Christian College Salesian Sisters	Calamba, Laguna		not applicable	Regulated
PIMSAT Colleges	Bacoor		not applicable	Regulated
South Forbes City College	Silang, Cavite		not applicable	Regulated
The Bearer of Light and Wisdom Colleges	Bacoor		not applicable	Regulated
University of Batangas-Lipa	Lipa, Batangas			Regulated
West Point College-Magallanes	Magallanes, Cavite		not applicable	Regulated
Young Ji College	General Trias		not applicable	Regulated
ACLC College of Taytay	Taytay, Rizal		not applicable	Regulated
College of Arts and Sciences of Asia and the Pacific	Taytay, Rizal		not applicable	Regulated
New Sinai School and Colleges-Sta. Rosa	Sta. Rosa, Laguna		not applicable	Regulated
St. Mary Magdalene Colleges of Laguna	Calamba, Laguna		not applicable	Regulated
BWEST College	Lucena		not applicable	Regulated
Center for Biblical Studies Institute & Seminary	Antipolo		not applicable	Regulated
Grain of Wheat College	Taytay, Rizal		not applicable	Regulated
ICT-ED Institute of Science and Technology	Lipa, Batangas		not applicable	Regulated
ICCT Colleges Foundation-Binangonan	Binangonan		not applicable	Regulated
ICCT Colleges Foundation-Taytay	Taytay, Rizal		not applicable	Regulated
Mater Redemptoris Collegium	Calauan		not applicable	Regulated
Mind and Integrity College	Calamba, Laguna		not applicable	Regulated
College of Saint John Paul II Arts And Sciences	Cainta		not applicable	Regulated
St. Augustine School of Nursing-Lipa	Lipa, Batangas		not applicable	Regulated
Paul College of Leadership	Cainta		not applicable	Regulated
ACLC College of San Pablo	San Pablo, Laguna		not applicable	Regulated
Citi Global College-Biñan	Biñan		not applicable	Regulated
Far East Asia Pacific Institute of Tourism Science and Technology	Tanza, Cavite		not applicable	Regulated
Guardian Bona Fide for Hope Foundation	Biñan		not applicable	Regulated
St. Augustine School of Nursing - Lucena	Lucena		not applicable	Regulated
NTC Education-Batangas	Tanauan, Batangas		not applicable	Regulated
Daehan College of Business and Technology	TayTay, Rizal		not applicable	Regulated
Citi Global College-Cabuyao	Cabuyao		not applicable	Regulated
New Era University - Lipa Campus	Lipa, Batangas			Regulated
Saint Joseph College of Rosario Batangas	Rosario, Batangas		not applicable	Regulated
CARD-MRI Development Institute	Bay, Laguna		not applicable	Regulated
Colegio de Sto. Domingo de Silos	Calatagan		not applicable	Regulated
Our Lady of La Sallete College Seminary	Silang, Cavite		not applicable	Regulated
Marasigan Institute of Science and Technology	Dasmariñas		not applicable	Regulated
Renaissance School of Science and Technology	Morong, Rizal		not applicable	Regulated
GRABSUM School	Candelaria, Quezon		not applicable	Regulated
Royal British College	Lipa, Batangas		not applicable	Regulated
Sapphire International Aviation Academy	Tanauan, Batangas		not applicable	Regulated
Southbay Montessori School and Colleges	Sta. Cruz, Laguna		not applicable	Regulated
St. Ignatius Technical Institute of Business and Arts	Sta. Rosa, Laguna		not applicable	Regulated
Westbridge Institute of Technology	Cabuyao		not applicable	Regulated
AISAT College-Dasmariñas	Dasmariñas		not applicable	Regulated
Lyceum de San Pablo	San Pablo, Laguna		not applicable	Regulated
MOL Magsaysay Maritime Academy	Dasmariñas		not applicable	Regulated
Southern Luzon College of Business Maritime Science and Technology	Dasmariñas		not applicable	Regulated
Informatics College Cavite	Imus		not applicable	Regulated
International Electronics and Technical Institute (Calamba)	Calamba, Laguna		not applicable	Regulated
New Era University-Baras Campus	Baras, Rizal		not applicable	Regulated
NU Sports Academy	Calamba, Laguna			Regulated
Olinsterg College	Tiaong		not applicable	Regulated
Our Lady of Fatima University-Sta. Rosa	Sta. Rosa, Laguna			Regulated
Red Link Institute of Science & Technology	Calamba, Laguna		not applicable	Regulated
Saint Peter's School (Calauag)	Calauag		not applicable	Regulated
CSTC College of Sciences Technology and Communications-Atinomnan	Atimonan		not applicable	Regulated
De La Salle-College of Saint Benilde-Antipolo	Antipolo		not applicable	Regulated
Saint Benilde International School-Calamba	Calamba, Laguna		not applicable	Regulated
St. Ignatius Technical Institute of Business and Arts-Cabuyao	Cabuyao, Laguna		not applicable	Regulated
St. Therese College of Arts and Sciences	Pila, Laguna		not applicable	Regulated
Victory Elijah Christian College	Antipolo City, Rizal		not applicable	Regulated
FCD Central Institute	Dasmariñas		not applicable	Regulated
Magna Anima Teachers College	Santa Rosa, Laguna		not applicable	Regulated
St. John Bosco College of Tayabas	Tayabas		not applicable	Regulated
First Industrial Science and Technology College	Sto. Tomas, Batangas		not applicable	Regulated
Lyceum of Southern Luzon	Balayan		not applicable	Regulated
NU Dasmariñas	Dasmariñas, Cavite			Regulated
Philippine Technological Institute of Science Arts and Trade-Central	General Mariano Alvarez		not applicable	Regulated
Samuel Christian College of General Trias	General Trias		not applicable	Regulated
St. Peregrine Institute	Bacoor, Cavite		not applicable	Regulated
CITI Global College-Calamba	Calamba, Laguna		not applicable	Regulated
Manuel S. Enverga University Foundation-Calauag	Calauag		not applicable	Regulated
Eastern Star Academy	San Mateo, Rizal		not applicable	Regulated
Asian Seminary of Christian Ministries	Silang, Cavite		not applicable	Regulated

== Bicol Region ==
=== Government ===
Name	Type	Location	Year established	Year granted university status	Regulation status
Aroroy Municipal College	LUC	Aroroy, Masbate		not applicable	Regulated
Bacacay Community College	LUC	Bacacay, Albay		not applicable	Regulated
Balud Municipal College	LUC	Balud, Masbate		not applicable	Regulated
Camalig Community College	LUC	Camalig, Albay	2027	not applicable	Regulated
Calabanga Community College	LUC	Calabanga, Camarines Sur		not applicable	Regulated
Caramoan Community College	LUC	Caramoan, Camarines Sur		not applicable	Regulated
Castilla Colleges	LUC	Castilla, Sorsogon	2022	not applicable	Regulated
Cataingan Municipal College	LUC	Cataingan, Masbate		not applicable	Regulated
Cawayan Community College	LUC	Cawayan, Masbate	2023	not applicable	Regulated
City College of Legazpi	LUC	Legazpi City		not applicable	Regulated
City College of Naga	LUC	Naga City		not applicable	Regulated
Community College of Manito	LUC	Manito, Albay		not applicable	Regulated
Daraga Community College	LUC	Daraga, Albay		not applicable	Regulated
Donsol Community College	LUC	Donsol, Sorsogon		not applicable	Regulated
Governor Mariano E. Villafuerte Community College-Garchitorena	LUC	Garchitorena, Camarines Sur		not applicable	Regulated
Governor Mariano E. Villafuerte Community College-Libmanan	LUC	Libmanan, Camarines Sur		not applicable	Regulated
Governor Mariano E. Villafuerte Community College-Siruma	LUC	Siruma, Camarines Sur		not applicable	Regulated
Governor Mariano E. Villafuerte Community College-Tinambac	LUC	Tinambac, Camarines Sur		not applicable	Regulated
Guinobatan Community College	LUC	Guinobatan, Albay	2024	not applicable	Regulated
Libon Community College	LUC	Libon, Albay		not applicable	Regulated
Ligao Community College	LUC	Ligao City		not applicable	Regulated
Malinao Community College	LUC	Malinao, Albay	2026	not applicable	Regulated
Matnog Community College	LUC	Matnog, Sorsogon	2026	not applicable	Regulated
Oas Community College	LUC	Oas, Albay	2000	not applicable	Regulated
Pilar Community College	LUC	Pilar, Sorsogon		not applicable	Regulated
Polangui Community College	LUC	Polangui, Albay	1966	not applicable	Regulated
Rapu-Rapu Community College	LUC	Rapu-Rapu, Albay		not applicable	Regulated
San Jose Community College	LUC	Malilipot, Albay		not applicable	Regulated
San Pascual Polytechnic College	LUC	San Pascual, Masbate		not applicable	Regulated
Sto. Domingo Community College	LUC	Sto. Domingo, Albay		not applicable	Regulated
Tiwi Community College	LUC	Tiwi, Albay		not applicable	Regulated
Bicol State College of Applied Sciences and Technology	SUC Main	Naga City		not applicable	Regulated
Bicol University-Main	SUC Main	Legazpi City	1921 as Albay Normal School	1969	Regulated
University of Camarines Norte-Main	SUC Main	Daet, Camarines Norte		2026	Regulated
Central Bicol State University of Agriculture-Main	SUC Main	Pili, Camarines Sur	1918 as the Camarines Agricultural School	2009	Regulated
Catanduanes State University-Main	SUC Main	Virac, Catanduanes			Regulated
Dr. Emilio B. Espinosa Sr. Memorial State College of Agriculture and Technology	SUC Main	Mandaon, Masbate		not applicable	Regulated
Partido State University-Main	SUC Main	Goa, Camarines Sur			Regulated
Polytechnic State University of Bicol	SUC Main	Nabua, Camarines Sur	1985	not applicable	Regulated
Rinconada State College	SUC Main	Baao, Camarines Sur	2025	not applicable	Regulated
Sorsogon State University-Main	SUC Main	Sorsogon City	1907 as the Sorsogon School of Arts and Trade	2021	Regulated
Bicol University-East Campus	SUC Satellite	EM's Bo. Legazpi City	1911 as the Albay Trade School	1969	Regulated
Bicol University-Daraga Campus	SUC Satellite	Daraga, Albay	1920's as the Daraga East Pilot Central School	1969	Regulated
Bicol University-Guinobatan Campus	SUC Satellite	Guinobatan, Albay	1912 as Guinobatan Rural High School	1969	Regulated
Bicol University-Tabaco Campus	SUC Satellite	Tabaco City	1949 as the Bicol School of Fishery	1969	Regulated
Bicol University-Polangui Campus	SUC Satellite	Polangui, Albay	1959 as the School for Philippine Craftsmen	2000 as a campus of Bicol University	Regulated
Bicol University-Gubat Campus	SUC Satellite	Gubat, Sorsogon	1996	1997	Regulated
Bicol University-College of Veterinary Medicine (Ligao Campus)	SUC Satellite	Ligao City		2026	Regulated
University of Camarines Norte-Labo Campus	SUC Satellite	Labo, Camarines Norte		not applicable	Regulated
University of Camarines Norte-Mercedes Campus	SUC Satellite	Mercedes, Camarines Norte		not applicable	Regulated
University of Camarines Norte-Panganiban Campus	SUC Satellite	Jose Panganiban, Camarines Norte		not applicable	Regulated
University of Camarines Norte-Entienza Campus	SUC Satellite	Sta. Elena, Camarines Norte		not applicable	Regulated
University of Camarines Norte-Abaño Campus	SUC Satellite	Daet		not applicable	Regulated
Catanduanes State University-Panganiban	SUC Satellite	Panganiban, Catanduanes			Regulated
Central Bicol State University of Agriculture-Calabanga	SUC Satellite	Calabanga, Camarines Sur			Regulated
Central Bicol State University of Agriculture-Sipocot	SUC Satellite	Sipocot			Regulated
Central Bicol State University of Agriculture-Pasacao	SUC Satellite	Pasacao			Regulated
Dr. Emilio B. Espinosa Sr. Memorial State College of Agriculture and Technology-Cawayan Campus	SUC Satellite	Cawayan, Masbate		not applicable	Regulated
Matnog Community College	LUC	Matnog		not applicable	Regulated
Partido State University-Sagñay Campus	SUC Satellite	Sagñay, Camarines Sur			Regulated
Partido State University-San Jose Campus	SUC Satellite	San Jose, Camarines Sur			Regulated
Partido State University-Tinambac Campus	SUC Satellite	Tinambac			Regulated
Partido State University-Salogon Campus	SUC Satellite	San Jose, Camarines Sur			Regulated
Partido State University-Caramoan Campus	SUC Satellite	Caramoan			Regulated
Partido State University-Lagonoy Campus	SUC Satellite	Lagonoy			Regulated
Polytechnic State University of Bicol-Buhi Campus	SUC Satellite	Buhi, Camarines Sur			Regulated
Sorsogon State University-Bulan Campus	SUC Satellite	Bulan, Sorsogon			Regulated
Sorsogon State University-Magallanes Campus	SUC Satellite	Magallanes, Sorsogon			Regulated
Sorsogon State University-Castilla Campus	SUC Satellite	Castilla, Sorsogon			Regulated
Polytechnic University of the Philippines-Ragay	SUC Satellite	Ragay			Regulated

=== Private ===
Name	Location	Year established	Year granted university status	Regulation status
Aemilianum College	Sorsogon City		not applicable	Regulated
Ago Medical and Educational Center	Legazpi, Albay		not applicable	Regulated
Bicol Christian College of Medicine	Legazpi, Albay		not applicable	Regulated
De Vera Institute of Technology	Legazpi, Albay		not applicable	Regulated
Annunciation College of Bacon Sorsogon Unit	Sorsogon City		not applicable	Regulated
University of Santo Tomas-Legazpi	Legazpi, Albay			Regulated
Ateneo de Naga University	Ateneo Avenue, Naga, Camarines Sur			Autonomous (by evaluation)
Bicol College	Daraga		not applicable	Regulated
Bicol Merchant Marine College	Sorsogon City		not applicable	Regulated
Camarines Norte College	Labo, Camarines Norte		not applicable	Regulated
Catanduanes Colleges	Virac, Catanduanes		not applicable	Regulated
Ceguera Technological Colleges	Iriga		not applicable	Regulated
St. Louise De Marillac College of Sorsogon	Sorsogon City		not applicable	Regulated
Universidad de Sta. Isabel	Naga, Camarines Sur			Regulated
Computer Arts and Technological College	Legazpi, Albay		not applicable	Regulated
Computer Communication Development Institute-Naga	Naga, Camarines Sur		not applicable	Regulated
Daniel B. Peña Memorial College Foundation	Tabaco		not applicable	Regulated
Divine Word College of Legazpi	Legazpi, Albay		not applicable	Regulated
Felix O. Alfelor Sr. Foundation College	Sipocot		not applicable	Regulated
Alfelor Sr. Memorial College	Del Gallego, Camarines Sur		not applicable	Regulated
Fatima School of Science and Technology	Goa, Camarines Sur		not applicable	Regulated
Holy Rosary Major Seminary	Naga, Camarines Sur		not applicable	Regulated
Holy Trinity College of Camarines Sur	Bato, Camarines Sur		not applicable	Regulated
Immaculate Conception College-Albay	Daraga		not applicable	Regulated
La Consolacion College-Iriga City	Iriga		not applicable	Regulated
La Consolacion College-Daet	Daet		not applicable	Regulated
Liceo de Masbate	Masbate City		not applicable	Regulated
Liceo de San Jacinto Foundation	San Jacinto, Masbate		not applicable	Regulated
Mabini Colleges	Daet		not applicable	Regulated
Mariners' Polytechnic Colleges Foundation of Canaman	Canaman		not applicable	Regulated
Mariners' Polytechnic Colleges Foundation of Naga City	Naga, Camarines Sur	Victory Nymph Montessori School	not applicable	Regulated
Mariners' Polytechnic Colleges Foundation of Legazpi City	Legazpi, Albay		not applicable	Regulated
Masbate Colleges	Masbate City		not applicable	Regulated
Mater Salutis College Seminary	Daraga		not applicable	Regulated
Naga College Foundation	Naga, Camarines Sur	1947	2027	Regulated
Osmeña Colleges	Masbate City		not applicable	Regulated
Our Lady of Lourdes College Foundation	Daet		not applicable	Regulated
Our Lady of Peñafrancia Seminary	Sorsogon City		not applicable	Regulated
Partido College	Goa, Camarines Sur		not applicable	Regulated
Perpetual Help Paramedical School	Tabaco		not applicable	Regulated
Pili Capital College	Pili, Camarines Sur		not applicable	Regulated
Polytechnic Institute of Tabaco	Tabaco		not applicable	Regulated
Naga View Adventist College	Naga, Camarines Sur		not applicable	Regulated
R.G. de Castro Colleges	Bulan, Sorsogon		not applicable	Regulated
Republic Colleges of Guinobatan	Guinobatan		not applicable	Regulated
Southern Bicol Colleges	Masbate City		not applicable	Regulated
Southern Luzon Institute	Bulan, Sorsogon		not applicable	Regulated
Southern Masbate Roosevelt College	Placer, Masbate		not applicable	Regulated
Tabaco College	Tabaco		not applicable	Regulated
Tanchuling College	Legazpi, Albay		not applicable	Regulated
University of Northeastern Philippines	Iriga			Regulated
University of Nueva Caceres	Naga, Camarines Sur			Regulated
University of Saint Anthony	Iriga			Regulated
Veritas College of Irosin	Irosin, Sorsogon		not applicable	Regulated
Worldtech Resources Foundation-Naga City	Naga, Camarines Sur		not applicable	Regulated
Worldtech Resources Foundation-Iriga City	Iriga		not applicable	Regulated
STI College-Legazpi	Legazpi, Albay		not applicable	Regulated
Lower Isarog Foundation Exponent	Tigaon, Camarines Sur		not applicable	Regulated
Speed Computer College	Sorsogon City		not applicable	Regulated
Zamora Memorial College	Bacacay		not applicable	Regulated
Colegio De Sta. Monica of Polangui	Polangui		not applicable	Regulated
Computer Communication Development Institute-Legazpi City	Legazpi, Albay		not applicable	Regulated
Sorsogon College of Criminology	Sorsogon City		not applicable	Regulated
St. Peter Baptist College Foundation	Lupi, Camarines Sur		not applicable	Regulated
AMA Computer College-Legazpi City	Legazpi, Albay		not applicable	Regulated
Dr. Carlos S. Lanting College-Dr. Ruby Lanting Casaul Educational Foundation	Tabaco		not applicable	Regulated
PLT College of Guinobatan	Guinobatan		not applicable	Regulated
Holy Trinity College Seminary	Labo, Camarines Norte		not applicable	Regulated
AMA Computer College-Naga City	Naga, Camarines Sur		not applicable	Regulated
Camarines Norte School of Law Arts and Sciences	Talisay, Camarines Norte		not applicable	Regulated
Solis Institute of Technology	Bulan, Sorsogon		not applicable	Regulated
The Lewis College	Sorsogon City		not applicable	Regulated
West Coast College	Pio Duran		not applicable	Regulated
Sta. Elena (Camarines Norte) College	Sta. Elena, Camarines Norte		not applicable	Regulated
Brentwood College of Asia International School	Naga, Camarines Sur		not applicable	Regulated
Capalonga College	Capalonga, Camarines Norte		not applicable	Regulated
Southern Luzon Technological College Foundation-Legazpi	Legazpi, Albay		not applicable	Regulated
Our Lady of Salvation College	Tiwi, Albay		not applicable	Regulated
Aeronautical Academy of the Philippines	Canaman		not applicable	Regulated
Computer Communication Development Institute-Sorsogon	Sorsogon City		not applicable	Regulated
Amando Cope College	Tabaco		not applicable	Regulated
Luis H. Dilanco Sr. Foundation College	Libmanan		not applicable	Regulated
Regina Mondi College	Iriga		not applicable	Regulated
Siena College-Tigaon	Tigaon, Camarines Sur		not applicable	Regulated
Estenias Science Foundation School	Casiguran, Sorsogon		not applicable	Regulated
Our Lady of the Most Holy Trinity College Seminary	Naga, Camarines Sur		not applicable	Regulated
Christian Polytechnic Institute of Catanduanes	Virac, Catanduanes		not applicable	Regulated
Forbes College	Legazpi, Albay		not applicable	Regulated
Shepherdville College	Tigaon, Camarines Sur		not applicable	Regulated
ACLC College of Daet	Daet		not applicable	Regulated
ACLC College of Sorsogon	Sorsogon City		not applicable	Regulated
STI College-Naga City	Naga, Camarines Sur		not applicable	Regulated
Infotech Development Systems Colleges	Ligao		not applicable	Regulated
Southern Luzon Technological College Foundation-Pilar	Pilar, Sorsogon		not applicable	Regulated
Southern Luzon Technological College Foundation-Pioduran	Pio Duran		not applicable	Regulated
Philippine Computer Foundation College-Pili	Pili, Camarines Sur		not applicable	Regulated
Belen B. Francisco Foundation-Albay	Daraga		not applicable	Regulated
Camarines Norte College of Arts and Business	Labo, Camarines Norte		not applicable	Regulated
ACLC College of Iriga City	Iriga		not applicable	Regulated
Computer Arts and Technological College-Polangui Campus	Polangui		not applicable	Regulated
Computer Arts and Technological College-Ligao City	Ligao		not applicable	Regulated
Mountview College	Naga, Camarines Sur		not applicable	Regulated
Computer Systems Institute	Legazpi, Albay		not applicable	Regulated
SPJ International Technology Institute	Tinambac		not applicable	Regulated
Cataingan Polytechnic Institute	Cataingan		not applicable	Regulated
Masbate Polytechnic and Development College	Baleno, Masbate		not applicable	Regulated
Masbate Central Technical Institute	Masbate City		not applicable	Regulated
Bicol Training and Technological College	Bacacay		not applicable	Regulated
St. Francis Carraciolo Culinary Academy	Vinzons		not applicable	Regulated
BST Grace College	San Fernando, Camarines Sur		not applicable	Regulated
Sta. Elena Institute of Science and Technology	Sta. Elena, Camarines Norte		not applicable	Regulated
Lyceum of St. Dominic	Sta. Elena, Camarines Norte		not applicable	Regulated
Northills College of Asia (NCA)	Labo, Camarines Norte		not applicable	Regulated
King Thomas Learning Academy	Sipocot		not applicable	Regulated
Buhi St. Joseph Academy	Buhi, Camarines Sur		not applicable	Regulated

== Western Visayas ==
=== Government ===
Name	Type	Location	Year established	Year granted university status	Regulation status
Vicente A. Javier Memorial Community College	LUC	Culasi, Antique		not applicable	Regulated
Batan Integrated College of Technology	LUC	Batan, Aklan		not applicable	Regulated
Libacao College of Science and Technology	LUC	Libacao		not applicable	Regulated
Altavas College	LUC	Altavas		not applicable	Regulated
Balete Community College	LUC	Balete, Aklan		not applicable	Regulated
Passi City College	LUC	Passi City, Iloilo		not applicable	Regulated
Iloilo City Community College	LUC	Molo, Iloilo City		not applicable	Regulated
Malay College	LUC	Malay, Aklan		not applicable	Regulated
Aklan State University-Banga Campus	SUC Main	Banga, Aklan			Regulated
Capiz State University-Main	SUC Main	Roxas City			Regulated
Guimaras State College-Main	SUC Main	Buenavista, Guimaras		not applicable	Regulated
Iloilo State College of Fisheries-Main	SUC Main	Barotac Nuevo		not applicable	Regulated
Northern Iloilo State University-Estancia Iloilo	SUC Main	Estancia, Iloilo			Regulated
University of Antique - Main	SUC Main	Sibalom, Antique		not applicable	Regulated
West Visayas State University-Main	SUC Main	La Paz, Iloilo City			Regulated
Iloilo Science and Technology University-Main	SUC Main	La Paz, Iloilo City			Regulated
Aklan State University-New Washington	SUC Satellite	New Washington, Aklan			Regulated
University of Antique - Hamtic	SUC Satellite	Hamtic, Antique			Regulated
Northern Iloilo State University-Batad Campus	SUC Satellite	Batad, Iloilo			Regulated
West Visayas State University-Calinog Campus	SUC Satellite	Calinog, Iloilo			Regulated
Northern Iloilo State University-Concepcion Campus	SUC Satellite	Concepcion, Iloilo			Regulated
Iloilo State College of Fisheries-Dingle Campus	SUC Satellite	Dingle, Iloilo		not applicable	Regulated
Iloilo State college of Fisheries-Dumangas Campus	SUC Satellite	Dumangas		not applicable	Regulated
Guimaras State College-Mosqueda	SUC Satellite	Jordan, Guimaras		not applicable	Regulated
West Visayas State University-Lambunao Campus	SUC Satellite	Lambunao			Regulated
Iloilo Science and Technology University-Leon Campus	SUC Satellite	Leon, Iloilo		not applicable	Regulated
Northern Iloilo State University-Barotac Viejo Campus	SUC Satellite	Barotac Viejo			Regulated
Capiz State University-Burias Campus	SUC Satellite	Roxas City			Regulated
West Visayas State University-Pototan Campus	SUC Satellite	Pototan, Iloilo		not applicable	Regulated
Capiz State University-Pontevedra Campus	SUC Satellite	Pontevedra, Capiz			Regulated
Aklan State University-Kalibo Campus	SUC Satellite	Kalibo			Regulated
Iloilo State College of Fisheries-San Enrique Campus	SUC Satellite	San Enrique, Iloilo		not applicable	Regulated
Iloilo Science and Technology University-Miagao Campus	SUC Satellite	Miagao			Regulated
University of Antique - Tario Lim Antique School of Fisheries	SUC Satellite	Tibiao			Regulated
University of the Philippines Visayas	Constituent university of the national university system	Miagao			Autonomous (by legislation)
Northern Iloilo State University-Sara Campus	SUC Satellite	Sara, Iloilo			Regulated
West Visayas State University-Janiuay Campus	SUC Satellite	Janiuay			Regulated
Northern Iloilo State University-Lemery Campus	SUC Satellite	Lemery, Iloilo			Regulated
Iloilo State College of Fisheries-Barotac Nuevo Campus	SUC Satellite	Barotac Nuevo		not applicable	Regulated
Northern Iloilo State University-Ajuy Campus	SUC Satellite	Ajuy, Iloilo			Regulated
Capiz State University-Sigma Campus	SUC Satellite	Sigma, Capiz			Regulated
Aklan State University-Ibajay Campus	SUC Satellite	Ibajay			Regulated
Aklan State University-Makato	SUC Satellite	Makato			Regulated
Iloilo Science and Technology University-Dumangas Campus	SUC Satellite	Dumangas		not applicable	Regulated
Iloilo Science and Technology University-Barotac Nuevo Campus	SUC Satellite	Barotac Nuevo		not applicable	Regulated
Capiz State University-Pilar Campus	SUC Satellite	Pilar, Capiz			Regulated
Capiz State University-Tapaz Campus	SUC Satellite	Tapaz			Regulated
Capiz State University-Dumarao Campus	SUC Satellite	Dumarao			Regulated
Capiz State University-Poblacion Mambusao	SUC Satellite	Mambusao			Regulated
Capiz State University-Dayao	SUC Satellite	Roxas City			Regulated
West Visayas State University-College of Agriculture and Forestry Lambunao	SUC Satellite	Lambunao			Regulated
Guimaras State College-Baterna Campus	SUC Satellite	San Lorenzo, Guimaras		not applicable	Regulated

=== Private ===
Name	Location	Year established	Year granted university status	Regulation status
Aklan Catholic College	Kalibo		not applicable	Regulated
Aklan Polytechnic College	Kalibo		not applicable	Regulated
ACSI College Iloilo	La Paz, Iloilo City		not applicable	Regulated
Cabalum Western College	Iloilo City		not applicable	Regulated
Central Philippine University	Jaro, Iloilo City			Autonomous (by evaluation)
Colegio de la Purisima Concepcion	Roxas City		not applicable	Regulated
Colegio de San Jose-Jaro	Jaro, Iloilo City		not applicable	Regulated
Colegio del Sagrado Corazon de Jesus	Iloilo City		not applicable	Regulated
Filamer Christian University	Roxas City			Deregulated (by evaluation)
Garcia College of Technology	Kalibo		not applicable	Regulated
Iloilo Doctors' College	Molo, Iloilo City		not applicable	Regulated
Iloilo Doctors' College of Medicine	Molo, Iloilo City		not applicable	Regulated
John B. Lacson Foundation Maritime University-Molo	Molo, Iloilo City			Autonomous (by evaluation)
John B. Lacson Foundation Maritime University-Arevalo	Arevalo, Iloilo City			Autonomous (by evaluation)
St. Therese-MTC Colleges-Tigbauan	Tigbauan, Iloilo		not applicable	Regulated
Northwestern Visayan Colleges	Kalibo		not applicable	Regulated
St. Anthony College of Roxas City	Roxas City		not applicable	Regulated
Saint Anthony's College-Antique	San Jose de Buenavista		not applicable	Regulated
Saint Gabriel College	Kalibo		not applicable	Regulated
St. Paul University of Iloilo	Iloilo City			Regulated
St. Vincent Ferrer Seminary	Jaro, Iloilo City		not applicable	Regulated
Sancta Maria Mater et Regina Seminarium	Roxas City		not applicable	Regulated
Santo Niño Seminary	Numancia, Aklan		not applicable	Regulated
University of Iloilo	Iloilo City			Regulated
University of San Agustin	Iloilo City			Deregulated (by evaluation)
Western Institute of Technology	La Paz, Iloilo City		not applicable	Regulated
Pandan Bay Institute	Pandan, Antique		not applicable	Regulated
AMA Computer College-Iloilo	Iloilo City		not applicable	Regulated
Interface Computer College-Iloilo	Mandurriao, Iloilo City		not applicable	Regulated
College of St. John-Roxas	Roxas City		not applicable	Regulated
St. Therese-MTC Colleges-La Fiesta	Molo, Iloilo City		not applicable	Regulated
Integrated Midwives Association of the Philippines Foundation School of Midwifery	Jaro, Iloilo City		not applicable	Regulated
St. Therese-MTC Colleges-Magdalo	La Paz, Iloilo City		not applicable	Regulated
ABE International Business College-Iloilo	Iloilo City		not applicable	Regulated
STI College-Kalibo	Kalibo		not applicable	Regulated
Hercor College	Roxas City		not applicable	Regulated
St. Vincent College of Science and Technology	Leganes, Iloilo		not applicable	Regulated
Advance Central College	San Jose de Buenavista		not applicable	Regulated
GSEF College	Cabatuan, Iloilo		not applicable	Regulated
ACLC College of Iloilo	Iloilo City		not applicable	Regulated
Santa Isabel College of Iloilo City	Mandurriao, Iloilo City		not applicable	Regulated
Hua Siong College of Iloilo	Iloilo City		not applicable	Regulated
Philippine College of Business and Accountancy	Nueva Valencia		not applicable	Regulated
St. Vincent College of Business and Accountancy	Ivisan		not applicable	Regulated
Iloilo Merchant Marine School	Pavia, Iloilo		not applicable	Regulated
University of Perpetual Help System Laguna Pueblo de Panay Campus	Roxas, Capiz			Regulated

== Central Visayas ==
=== Government ===
Name	Type	Location	Year established	Year granted university status	Regulation status
Trinidad Municipal College	LUC	Trinidad, Bohol		not applicable	Regulated
Buenavista Community College	LUC	Buenavista, Bohol		not applicable	Regulated
Talisay City College	LUC	Talisay, Cebu		not applicable	Regulated
Cordova Public College	LUC	Cordova, Cebu		not applicable	Regulated
Madridejos Community College	LUC	Madridejos, Cebu		not applicable	Regulated
Mandaue City College	LUC	Mandaue		not applicable	Regulated
Consolacion Community College	LUC	Consolacion		not applicable	Regulated
Sibonga Community College	LUC	Sibonga		not applicable	Regulated
Lapu-lapu City College	LUC	Lapu-Lapu City		not applicable	Regulated
Carcar City College	LUC	Carcar		not applicable	Regulated
Tagbilaran City College	LUC	Tagbilaran		not applicable	Regulated
Talibon Polytechnic College	LUC	Talibon		not applicable	Regulated
Colegio de Getafe	LUC	Getafe, Bohol		not applicable	Regulated
Cebu Normal University	SUC Main	Cebu City			Regulated
Cebu Technological University - Main	SUC Main	Cebu City			Regulated
Bohol Island State University - Bilar	SUC Main	Bilar, Bohol		not applicable	Regulated
Bohol Island State University - Tagbilaran	SUC Satellite	Tagbilaran			Regulated
Bohol Island State University - Candijay	SUC Satellite	Candijay, Bohol			Regulated
Bohol Island State University - Calape Polytechnic College	SUC Satellite	Calape, Bohol			Regulated
Cebu Normal University - Balamban	SUC Satellite	Balamban			Regulated
Cebu Normal University - Medellin	SUC Satellite	Medellin, Cebu			Regulated
Cebu Technological University-Argao Campus	SUC Satellite	Argao			Regulated
Cebu Technological University-Daanbantayan Campus	SUC Satellite	Daanbantayan, Cebu			Regulated
Cebu Technological University-Danao City Campus	SUC Satellite	Danao, Cebu			Regulated
Cebu Technological University-Barili Campus	SUC Satellite	Barili, Cebu			Regulated
Cebu Technological University-Moalboal Campus	SUC Satellite	Moalboal			Regulated
Cebu Technological University-San Francisco Campus	SUC Satellite	San Francisco, Cebu			Regulated
Cebu Technological University-Tuburan Campus	SUC Satellite	Tuburan, Cebu			Regulated
Philippine State College of Aeronautics-Mactan Air Base	SUC Satellite	Lapu-Lapu City		not applicable	Regulated
Negros Oriental State University-Siaton Community College	SUC Satellite	Siaton			Regulated
University of the Philippines Cebu	Constituent university of the national university system	Cebu City	1918 as a campus; 2010 as an autonomous unit	2016 as a constituent university	Autonomous (by legislation)
Cebu Technological University - College of Fisheries Technology - Carmen	SUC Satellite	Carmen, Cebu		not applicable	Regulated
Bohol Island State University - Clarin	SUC Satellite	Clarin, Bohol			Regulated
Bohol Island State University-Balilihan Campus	SUC Satellite	Balilihan		not applicable	Regulated

=== Private ===
Name	Location	Year established	Year granted university status	Regulation status
AMA Computer College-Cebu City	Cebu City		not applicable	Regulated
Asian College of Technology	Talisay, Cebu		not applicable	Regulated
Baptist Theological College	Mandaue		not applicable	Regulated
Blessed Trinity College	Talibon		not applicable	Regulated
BIT International College-Tagbilaran	Tagbilaran		not applicable	Regulated
Bohol Institute of Technology-Jagna	Jagna, Bohol		not applicable	Regulated
BIT International College-Talibon	Talibon		not applicable	Regulated
CATS Aero College	Cebu City		not applicable	Regulated
Cebu Doctor's University	Mandaue		2004	Regulated
Cebu Doctor's University College of Medicine	Mandaue			Regulated
Cebu Eastern College	Cebu City		not applicable	Regulated
Cebu Institute of Medicine	Cebu City		not applicable	Regulated
Cebu Institute of Technology-University	Natalio Bacalso Avenue, Cebu City		not applicable	Autonomous (by evaluation)
Cebu Roosevelt Memorial College	Bogo		not applicable	Regulated
Saint Paul College Foundation	Cebu City		not applicable	Regulated
Cebu School of Midwifery	Cebu City		not applicable	Regulated
College of Technological Sciences-Cebu	Cebu City		not applicable	Regulated
Concord Technical Institute	Cebu City		not applicable	Regulated
Holy Name University	Cor. Gallegas and Lessage Sts., Tagbilaran			Deregulated (by evaluation)
Felipe R. Verallo Memorial Foundation-Bogo	Bogo		not applicable	Regulated
University of the Visayas-Gullas College of Medicine	Mandaue			Regulated
Holy Trinity College	Ginatilan, Cebu		not applicable	Regulated
Immaculate Heart of Mary Seminary	Tagbilaran		not applicable	Regulated
Indiana School of Aeronautics	Lapu-Lapu City		not applicable	Regulated
University of the Visayas-Mandaue Campus	Mandaue			Regulated
Mater Dei College-Bohol	Tubigon		not applicable	Regulated
Northern Cebu College	Bogo		not applicable	Regulated
PMI Colleges-Bohol	Tagbilaran		not applicable	Regulated
Saint Theresa's College of Cebu	Cebu City		not applicable	Regulated
Salazar Colleges of Science and Institute of Technology	Cebu City		not applicable	Regulated
San Carlos Seminary College	Cebu City		not applicable	Regulated
Southwestern University	Cebu City			Regulated
St. Catherine's College	Carcar		not applicable	Regulated
Southwestern University-Matias H. Aznar Memorial College of Medicine	Cebu City			Regulated
University of the Visayas-Toledo City Campus	Toledo City, Cebu			Regulated
University of Bohol	Tagbilaran			Regulated
University of Cebu	Cebu City			Autonomous (by evaluation)
University of San Carlos	Cebu City			Regulated
University of San Jose-Recoletos	Cor. Magallanes and P. Lopez Sts., Cebu City			Autonomous (by evaluation)
University of Southern Philippines Foundation	Cebu City			Regulated
University of the Visayas	Colon, Cebu City			Deregulated (by evaluation)
Velez College	Cebu City		not applicable	Regulated
Batuan Colleges	Batuan, Bohol		not applicable	Regulated
Don Bosco Technical College	Cebu City		not applicable	Regulated
Royal Christian College	Mandaue		not applicable	Regulated
University of Cebu-Lapulapu and Mandaue	Mandaue			Regulated
De La Salle Andres Soriano Memorial College	Toledo City, Cebu		not applicable	Regulated
Bantayan Southern Institute	Bantayan, Cebu		not applicable	Regulated
Mount Moriah College	Poro, Cebu		not applicable	Regulated
STI College-Cebu	Cebu City		not applicable	Regulated
Visayan Nazarene Bible College	Cebu City		not applicable	Regulated
Bohol Northern Star College	Ubay, Bohol		not applicable	Regulated
CBD College	Cebu City		not applicable	Regulated
Consolatrix College of Toledo City	Toledo City, Cebu		not applicable	Regulated
Evangelical Theological College of the Philippines	Cebu City		not applicable	Regulated
Saint Louise de Marillac College-Bogo	Bogo		not applicable	Regulated
Seminaryo Mayor de San Carlos	Cebu City		not applicable	Regulated
Advanced Institute of Technology	Lapu-Lapu City		not applicable	Regulated
Collegium Societatis Angeli Pacis	Talisay, Cebu		not applicable	Regulated
Centre for International Education Global Colleges	Cebu City		not applicable	Regulated
BIT International College-Carmen	Carmen, Bohol		not applicable	Regulated
University of the Visayas -Gullas College Danao City Branch	Danao, Cebu			Regulated
Benedicto College	Mandaue		not applicable	Regulated
Northeastern Cebu Colleges	Danao, Cebu		not applicable	Regulated
St. Paul College Foundation-Mandaue	Mandaue		not applicable	Regulated
University of Cebu-Banilad	Cebu City			Regulated
Bohol Northwestern Colleges	Catigbian		not applicable	Regulated
Cebu Sacred Heart College	Talisay, Cebu		not applicable	Regulated
Larmen De Guia Memorial College	Mandaue		not applicable	Regulated
Interface Computer College	Cebu City		not applicable	Regulated
Mary's Children Formation College	Minglanilla		not applicable	Regulated
Rogationist Seminary College-Cebu	Cebu City		not applicable	Regulated
Colegio de San Antonio de Padua	Danao, Cebu		not applicable	Regulated
Cristal e-College-Tagbilaran	Tagbilaran		not applicable	Regulated
STI College-Bohol	Dauis, Bohol		not applicable	Regulated
University of the Visayas-Gullas College Minglanilla Campus	Minglanilla			Regulated
Bohol Wisdom School	Tagbilaran		not applicable	Regulated
Central Philippine Bible College	Cebu City		not applicable	Regulated
Cebu Mary Immaculate College	Cebu City		not applicable	Regulated
ACLC College of Mandaue	Mandaue		not applicable	Regulated
Immanuel Bible College	Cebu City		not applicable	Regulated
Trade-Tech International Science Institute	Mandaue		not applicable	Regulated
Cristal e-College (Panglao Campus)	Panglao		not applicable	Regulated
Professional Academy of the Philippines	Cebu City		not applicable	Regulated
La Consolacion College-Liloan	Liloan, Cebu		not applicable	Regulated
Sto. Tomas College-Danao City	Danao, Cebu		not applicable	Regulated
Microsystem International Institute of Technology	Naga City, Cebu		not applicable	Regulated
University of The Visayas-Dalaguete Campus	Dalaguete			Regulated
Lyceum of Cebu	Cebu City		not applicable	Regulated
Golden Success College	Cebu City		not applicable	Regulated
ACLC-Tagbilaran	Tagbilaran		not applicable	Regulated
St. Cecilia's College - Cebu	Minglanilla		not applicable	Regulated
Saint Louis College -Cebu	Mandaue		not applicable	Regulated
Mary Our Help Technical Institute for Women	Minglanilla		not applicable	Regulated
Rosemont Hills Montessori College	Danao, Cebu		not applicable	Regulated
Salazar Colleges of Science and Institute of Technology-Madredijos	Madridejos, Cebu		not applicable	Regulated
Tabor Hills College	Cebu City		not applicable	Regulated
Rizwoods Colleges	Cebu City		not applicable	Regulated
Informatics College Cebu	Cebu City		not applicable	Regulated
Bohol International Learning College	Cortes, Bohol		not applicable	Regulated
University of Cebu College of Medicine Foundation	Mandaue			Regulated
Benthel Asia School of Technology	Lapu-Lapu City		not applicable	Regulated
Salazar Colleges of Science and Institute of Technology-Talisay City	Talisay, Cebu		not applicable	Regulated
Rizwoods College-Lapulapu	Lapu-Lapu City		not applicable	Regulated
Sto. Niño Mactan College	Lapu-Lapu City		not applicable	Regulated
Asian College of Technology International Educational Foundation	Cebu City		not applicable	Regulated

== Eastern Visayas ==
=== Government ===
Name	Type	Location	Year established	Year granted university status	Regulation status
Abuyog Community College	LUC	Abuyog		not applicable	Regulated
Colegio De Las Navas	LUC	Las Navas		not applicable	Regulated
Burauen Community College	LUC	Burauen	2018	not applicable	Regulated
Eastern Samar State University	SUC Main	Borongan			Regulated
Eastern Visayas State University	SUC Main	Tacloban	1907	2004	Regulated
Leyte Normal University	SUC Main	Tacloban			Regulated
Biliran Province State University-Main	SUC Main	Naval, Biliran			Regulated
Palompon Institute of Technology	SUC Main	Palompon		not applicable	Regulated
Samar State University	SUC Main	Catbalogan			Regulated
Southern Leyte State University	SUC Main	Sogod, Southern Leyte			Regulated
Northwest Samar State University	SUC Main	Calbayog			Regulated
University of Eastern Philippines	SUC Main	Catarman, Northern Samar	1918 as Catarman Farm School	1964	Regulated
Visayas State University	SUC Main	Baybay	1924 as Baybay Agricultural School	2007	Regulated
Biliran Province State University-Biliran Campus	SUC Satellite	Biliran, Biliran			Regulated
Eastern Samar State University-Can-Avid Campus	SUC Satellite	Can-Avid			Regulated
Eastern Visayas State University-Carigara Campus	SUC Satellite	Carigara			Regulated
Eastern Samar State University-Guiuan Campus	SUC Satellite	Guiuan			Regulated
Visayas State University-Isabel Campus	SUC Satellite	Isabel, Leyte			Regulated
University of Eastern Philippines-Laoang Campus	SUC Satellite	Laoang			Regulated
Visayas State University-Villaba Campus	SUC Satellite	Villaba			Regulated
Eastern Visayas State University-Tanauan Campus	SUC Satellite	Tanauan, Leyte			Regulated
Visayas State University-Alang-Alang Campus	SUC Satellite	Alangalang			Regulated
Visayas State University-Tolosa Campus	SUC Satellite	Tolosa, Leyte			Regulated
University of Eastern Philippines-Catubig Campus	SUC Satellite	Catubig			Regulated
Southern Leyte State University-Bontoc Campus	SUC Satellite	Bontoc, Southern Leyte		not applicable	Regulated
Northwest Samar State University-San Jorge Campus	SUC Satellite	San Jorge, Western Samar			Regulated
Samar State University-Mercedes Campus	SUC Satellite	Catbalogan			Regulated
Samar State University-Basey Campus	SUC Satellite	Basey			Regulated
Southern Leyte State University-San Juan Campus	SUC Satellite	San Juan, Southern Leyte			Regulated
Southern Leyte State University-Hinunangan Campus	SUC Satellite	Hinungangan			Regulated
Eastern Samar State University-Salcedo Campus	SUC Satellite	Salcedo, Eastern Samar			Regulated
Southern Leyte State University-Tomas Oppus Campus	SUC Satellite	Tomas Oppus			Regulated
University of the Philippines Tacloban	Constituent university of the national university system	Tacloban	1973 as a campus; 2023 as an autonomous unit	2026 as a constituent university	Autonomous (by legislation)
Eastern Visayas State University-Burauen Campus	SUC Satellite	Burauen	1999		Regulated
Palompon Institute of Technology-Tabango Campus	SUC Satellite	Tabango		not applicable	Regulated
Eastern Visayas State University-Ormoc Campus	SUC Satellite	Ormoc	1999		Regulated
Eastern Samar State University-Maydolong Campus	SUC Satellite	Maydolong			Regulated
Samar State University-Paranas Campus	SUC Satellite	Paranas			Regulated
Southern Leyte State University-Maasin Campus	SUC Satellite	Maasin			Regulated
University of the Philippines Manila - School of Health Sciences	SUC Satellite	Palo, Leyte	1976		Autonomous (by legislation)

=== Private ===
Name	Location	Year established	Year granted university status	Regulation status
Asian Development Foundation College	Tacloban		not applicable	Regulated
Christ the King College-Calbayog City	Calbayog		not applicable	Regulated
The College of Maasin	Maasin		not applicable	Regulated
Dr. V. Orestes Romualdez Educational Foundation	Tacloban		not applicable	Regulated
Doña Remedios Trinidad-Romualdez Medical Foundation	Tacloban		not applicable	Regulated
Franciscan College of the Immaculate Conception	Baybay		not applicable	Regulated
Holy Infant College	Tacloban		not applicable	Regulated
Leyte Colleges	Tacloban		not applicable	Regulated
St. Mary's College of Catbalogan	Catbalogan		not applicable	Regulated
Sacred Heart Seminary	Palo, Leyte		not applicable	Regulated
Saint Joseph College	Maasin		not applicable	Regulated
St. Mary's College of Borongan	Borongan		not applicable	Regulated
St. Peter's College of Ormoc	Ormoc		not applicable	Regulated
Saint Vincent De Paul College Seminary	Calbayog		not applicable	Regulated
Samar Colleges	Catbalogan		not applicable	Regulated
Colegio de San Lorenzo Ruiz de Manila of Northern Samar	Catarman, Northern Samar		not applicable	Regulated
Saint Paul School of Professional Studies	Palo, Leyte		not applicable	Regulated
Saint Thomas Aquinas College	Sogod, Southern Leyte		not applicable	Regulated
Sto. Niño College of Ormoc	Ormoc		not applicable	Regulated
Western Leyte College of Ormoc City	Ormoc		not applicable	Regulated
JE Mondejar Computer College	Tacloban		not applicable	Regulated
Mater Divinae Gratiae College	Dolores, Eastern Samar		not applicable	Regulated
Our Lady of Mercy College	Borongan		not applicable	Regulated
Bato Institute of Science and Technology	Bato, Leyte		not applicable	Regulated
Holy Cross College of Carigara	Carigara		not applicable	Regulated
STI College-Ormoc	Ormoc		not applicable	Regulated
Eastern Visayas Central Colleges	Catarman, Northern Samar		not applicable	Regulated
AMA Computer College-Tacloban City	Tacloban		not applicable	Regulated
Saint Scholastica's College-Tacloban	Palo, Leyte		not applicable	Regulated
ABE International College of Business and Economics-Tacloban City	Tacloban		not applicable	Regulated
Saint Michael College of Hindang	Hindang		not applicable	Regulated
Holy Spirit College Foundation of Leyte	Tacloban		not applicable	Regulated
Montano Lamberte Go College of Learning	Hilongos		not applicable	Regulated
Northern Samar Colleges	Catarman, Northern Samar		not applicable	Regulated
Asia College of Advance Studies In Arts Sciences and Technology	Bobon		not applicable	Regulated
St. John the Evangelist School of Theology	Palo, Leyte		not applicable	Regulated
Colegio de San Juan Samar	Lavezares		not applicable	Regulated
Colegio De Sta. Lourdes of Leyte Foundation	Tabontabon		not applicable	Regulated
Colegio de la Salle Fondation de Tacloban	Tacloban		not applicable	Regulated
Holy Virgin of Salvacion Foundation College	Tacloban		not applicable	Regulated
San Lorenzo Ruiz College of Ormoc	Ormoc		not applicable	Regulated
ACLC College-Tacloban City	Tacloban		not applicable	Regulated
ACLC College-Ormoc	Ormoc		not applicable	Regulated
Tan Ting Bing Memorial Colleges Foundation	San Isidro, Northern Samar		not applicable	Regulated
Global School for Technological Studies	Catarman, Northern Samar		not applicable	Regulated

== Zamboanga Peninsula ==
=== Government ===
Name	Type	Location	Year established	Year granted university status	Regulation status
Zamboanga del Sur Provincial Government College	LUC	Aurora, Zamboanga del Sur		not applicable	Regulated
Colegio de La Ciudad de Zamboanga	LUC	Zamboanga City		not applicable	Regulated
Zamboanga del Sur Provincial Government College - Pagadian	LUC	Pagadian		not applicable	Regulated
Pagadian City International College	LUC	Pagadian		not applicable	Regulated
Basilan State University	SUC Main	Isabela, Basilan		2021	Regulated
Western Mindanao State University	SUC Main	Zamboanga City			Regulated
Zamboanga Peninsula Polytechnic State University	SUC Main	Zamboanga City			Regulated
Zamboanga State College of Marine Sciences and Technology	SUC Main	Zamboanga City		not applicable	Regulated
Josefina H. Cerilles State College	SUC Main	San Miguel, Zamboanga del Sur		not applicable	Regulated
Jose Rizal Memorial State University - Main	SUC Main	Dapitan			Regulated
Jose Rizal Memorial State University-Katipunan Campus	SUC Satellite	Dapitan			Regulated
Western Mindanao State University-Alicia	SUC Satellite	Alicia, Zamboanga Sibugay			Regulated
Western Mindanao State University-Aurora	SUC Satellite	Aurora, Zamboanga del Sur			Regulated
Western Mindanao State University-Diplahan	SUC Satellite	Diplahan			Regulated
Western Mindanao State University-Imelda	SUC Satellite	Imelda, Zamboanga Sibugay			Regulated
Western Mindanao State University-Ipil	SUC Satellite	Ipil, Zamboanga Sibugay			Regulated
Western Mindanao State University-Mabuhay	SUC Satellite	Mabuhay, Zamboanga Sibugay			Regulated
Western Mindanao State University-Malangas	SUC Satellite	Malangas			Regulated
Western Mindanao State University-Molave	SUC Satellite	Molave, Zamboanga del Sur			Regulated
Western Mindanao State University-Olutanga	SUC Satellite	Olutanga, Zamboanga Sibugay		not applicable	Regulated
Western Mindanao State University-Pagadian	SUC Satellite	Pagadian			Regulated
Western Mindanao State University-Siay	SUC Satellite	Siay			Regulated
Western Mindanao State University-Tungawan	SUC Satellite	Tungawan			Regulated
Western Mindanao State University-Naga	SUC Satellite	Naga, Zamboanga Sibugay			Regulated
Western Mindanao State University-Curuan	SUC Satellite	Zamboanga City			Regulated
Josefina H. Cerilles State College - Dumingag	SUC Satellite	Dumingag, Zamboanga del Sur		not applicable	Regulated
Josefina H. Cerilles State College-Canuto M.S. Enerio College of Arts and Trades	SUC Satellite	Lakewood, Zamboanga del Sur		not applicable	Regulated
Jose Rizal Memorial State University-Dipolog	SUC Satellite	Dipolog			Regulated
Jose Rizal Memorial State University-Siocon	SUC Satellite	Siocon			Regulated
Mindanao State University-Buug College	SUC Satellite	Buug			Regulated
Jose Rizal Memorial State University-Sibuco	SUC Satellite	Sibuco			Regulated
Jose Rizal Memorial State University-Tampilisan	SUC Satellite	Dapitan			Regulated
Sulu State University	SUC Main	Jolo, Sulu		2025	Regulated

=== Private ===
Name	Location	Year established	Year granted university status	Regulation status
Andres Bonifacio College	Dipolog		not applicable	Regulated
Ateneo de Zamboanga University	La Purisima St., Zamboanga City			Autonomous (by evaluation)
Brent Hospital and Colleges	Zamboanga City		not applicable	Regulated
Claret College of Isabela	Isabela, Basilan		not applicable	Regulated
DMC College Foundation	Dipolog		not applicable	Regulated
Dr. Aurelio Mendoza Memorial Colleges	Ipil, Zamboanga Sibugay		not applicable	Regulated
Immaculate Conception Archdiocesan School	Zamboanga City		not applicable	Regulated
Juan S. Alano Memorial School	Isabela, Basilan		not applicable	Regulated
Marian College	Ipil, Zamboanga Sibugay		not applicable	Regulated
Blancia College Foundation	Molave, Zamboanga del Sur		not applicable	Regulated
Philippine Advent College	Sindangan		not applicable	Regulated
Pilar College of Zamboanga City	Zamboanga City		not applicable	Regulated
Rizal Memorial Institute of Dapitan City	Dapitan		not applicable	Regulated
Saint Columban College	Pagadian		not applicable	Regulated
St. John College of Buug Foundation	Buug		not applicable	Regulated
Saint Joseph College of Sindangan	Sindangan		not applicable	Regulated
Saint Vincent's College	Dipolog		not applicable	Regulated
Saint Estanislao Kostka College	Manukan, Zamboanga del Norte		not applicable	Regulated
Southern Mindanao College-Agro Tech	Dumalinao		not applicable	Regulated
Southern City Colleges	Zamboanga City		not applicable	Regulated
Southern Mindanao Colleges	Pagadian		not applicable	Regulated
Universidad de Zamboanga	Zamboanga City			Regulated
STI College-Zamboanga	Zamboanga City		not applicable	Regulated
Medina College-Pagadian	Pagadian		not applicable	Regulated
Zamboanga Del Sur Maritime Institute of Technology	Pagadian		not applicable	Regulated
Pagadian Capitol College	Pagadian		not applicable	Regulated
Aurora Pioneers Memorial College	Aurora, Zamboanga del Sur		not applicable	Regulated
Dipolog City Institute of Technology	Dipolog		not applicable	Regulated
Ebenezer Bible College and Seminary	Zamboanga City		not applicable	Regulated
St. Mary's College of Labason	Labason		not applicable	Regulated
AMA Computer College-Zamboanga City	Zamboanga City		not applicable	Regulated
Colegio de San Francisco Javier of Rizal Zamboanga del Norte	Rizal, Zamboanga del Norte		not applicable	Regulated
Computer Technologies Institute of Zamboanga City	Zamboanga City		not applicable	Regulated
Computer Technologies Institute of Basilan	Isabela, Basilan		not applicable	Regulated
HMIJ Foundation Philippine Islamic College	Zamboanga City		not applicable	Regulated
Eastern Mindanao College of Technology	Pagadian		not applicable	Regulated
Universidad de Zamboanga-Ipil	Ipil, Zamboanga Sibugay			Regulated
Medina College-Ipil	Ipil, Zamboanga Sibugay		not applicable	Regulated
Philippine Technological and Marine Sciences-Zamboanga del Sur	Pagadian		not applicable	Regulated
Western Mindanao Foundation College	Zamboanga City		not applicable	Regulated
Southern Peninsula College	Labason		not applicable	Regulated
Lucan Central Colleges	Pagadian		not applicable	Regulated
Sibugay Technical Institute	Ipil, Zamboanga Sibugay		not applicable	Regulated
Universidad de Zamboanga - Pagadian	Pagadian			Regulated
Aim High College	Ipil, Zamboanga Sibugay		not applicable	Regulated
Ave Maria College	Liloy		not applicable	Regulated
Hyrons College Philippines	Tukuran		not applicable	Regulated
Nuevo Zamboanga College	Zamboanga City		not applicable	Regulated
Philippine Advent College-Salug	Salug		not applicable	Regulated
Yllana Bay View College	Pagadian		not applicable	Regulated
Alhadeetha Mindanao College	Labangan		not applicable	Regulated
STI College - Dipolog	Dipolog		not applicable	Regulated
Southern City Colleges-West Campus	Zamboanga City		not applicable	Regulated
ZAMSULA Everlasting College	Salug		not applicable	Regulated
Our Lady of Triumph Institute of Technology	Pagadian		not applicable	Regulated
West Prime Horizon Institute	Pagadian		not applicable	Regulated
Ferndale College - - Zamboanga Peninsula	Zamboanga City		not applicable	Regulated
Metro Zampen College	Zamboanga City		not applicable	Regulated
Emmauss College of Theology Foundation	Zamboanga City		not applicable	Regulated
Philippine Advent College - Leon B. Postigo Campus	Sindangan		not applicable	Regulated

== Northern Mindanao ==
=== Government ===
Name	Type	Location	Year established	Year granted university status	Regulation status
Tangub City Global College	LUC	Tangub		not applicable	Regulated
Tagoloan Community College	LUC	Tagoloan, Misamis Oriental		not applicable	Regulated
Initao College	LUC	Initao		not applicable	Regulated
Opol Community College	LUC	Opol		not applicable	Regulated
Don Carlos Polytechnic College	LUC	Don Carlos, Bukidnon		not applicable	Regulated
Pangantucan Bukidnon Community College	LUC	Pangantucan		not applicable	Regulated
City College of El Salvador	LUC	El Salvador, Misamis Oriental		not applicable	Regulated
Community College of Gingoog City	LUC	Gingoog		not applicable	Regulated
Magsaysay College	LUC	Magsaysay, Misamis Oriental		not applicable	Regulated
Salay Community College	LUC	Salay		not applicable	Regulated
Tubod College	LUC	Tubod, Lanao del Norte		not applicable	Regulated
Bukidnon State University	SUC Main	Malaybalay			Regulated
Camiguin Polytechnic State College	SUC Main	Mambajao		not applicable	Regulated
Central Mindanao University	SUC Main	Maramag			Regulated
University of Science and Technology of Southern Philippines	SUC Main	Cagayan de Oro			Regulated
University of Northwestern Mindanao	SUC Main	Tangub		2026	Regulated
Northern Bukidnon State College	SUC Main	Manolo Fortich		not applicable	Regulated
Bukidnon State University-Alubijid ESC	SUC Satellite	Alubijid			Regulated
Bukidnon State University-Libona	SUC Satellite	Libona			Regulated
Bukidnon State University-Baungon BSU	SUC Satellite	Baungon			Regulated
Bukidnon State University-Kalilangan BSU	SUC Satellite	Kalilangan			Regulated
Bukidnon State University-Medina ESC	SUC Satellite	Medina, Misamis Oriental			Regulated
Bukidnon State University-Sugbongcogon ESC	SUC Satellite	Sugbongcogon			Regulated
Bukidnon State University-Talakag BSU	SUC Satellite	Talakag			Regulated
Bukidnon State University-Talisayan ESC	SUC Satellite	Talisayan			Regulated
Bukidnon State University-Malitbog	SUC Satellite	Malitbog, Bukidnon			Regulated
Bukidnon State University-Kadingilan	SUC Satellite	Kadingilan			Regulated
University of Science and Technology of Southern Philippines - Jasaan	SUC Satellite	Jasaan			Regulated
University of Science and Technology of Southern Philippines - Oroquieta	SUC Satellite	Oroquieta			Regulated
University of Science and Technology of Southern Philippines - Panaon	SUC Satellite	Panaon, Misamis Occidental			Regulated
University of Science and Technology of Southern Philippines - Claveria	SUC Satellite	Claveria, Misamis Oriental			Regulated
Mindanao State University-Naawan	SUC Satellite	Naawan			Regulated
Bukidnon State University-Cabanglasan ESC	SUC Satellite	Cabanglasan			Regulated
Bukidnon State University-Damulog Satellite ESC	SUC Satellite	Damulog			Regulated
Bukidnon State University-Kitaotao Satellite ESC	SUC Satellite	Kitaotao			Regulated
Bukidnon State University-Quezon Satellite ESC	SUC Satellite	Quezon, Bukidnon			Regulated
Bukidnon State University-San Fernando Satellite ESC	SUC Satellite	San Fernando, Bukidnon			Regulated
Bukidnon State University-Impasugong	SUC Satellite	Impasugong			Regulated
Mindanao State University-Lanao Del Norte Agricultural College	SUC Satellite	Sultan Naga Dimaporo			Regulated
Mindanao State University-Maigo School of Arts and Trades	SUC Satellite	Maigo			Regulated
Mindanao State University - Iligan Institute of Technology	SUC Satellite	Iligan			Regulated
University of Science and Technology in Southern Philippines-Alubijid	SUC Satellite	Alubijid			Regulated
University of Science and Technology in Southern Philippines-Balubal	SUC Satellite	Cagayan de Oro			Regulated
University of Science and Technology in Southern Philippines-Villanueva	SUC Satellite	Villanueva, Misamis Oriental			Regulated

=== Private ===
Name	Location	Year established	Year granted university status	Regulation status
Blessed Mother College	Cagayan de Oro		not applicable	Regulated
Capitol University	Cagayan de Oro			Autonomous (by evaluation)
Cagayan De Oro College	Cagayan de Oro		not applicable	Regulated
Christ the King College	Gingoog		not applicable	Regulated
Colegio De Santo Niño De Jasaan	Jasaan		not applicable	Regulated
Fatima College of Camiguin	Mambajao		not applicable	Regulated
Gingoog City College	Gingoog		not applicable	Regulated
Gingoog Christian College	Gingoog		not applicable	Regulated
La Salle University	Ozamiz			Regulated
Liceo De Cagayan University	Cagayan de Oro			Regulated
Lourdes College	Cagayan de Oro		not applicable	Regulated
Medina College	Ozamiz		not applicable	Regulated
Medina Foundation College	Sapang Dalaga		not applicable	Regulated
Mindanao Arts and Technological Institute	Malaybalay		not applicable	Regulated
Misamis Institute of Technology	Ozamiz		not applicable	Regulated
Misamis University	Ozamiz			Autonomous (by evaluation)
Misamis University-Oroquieta City	Oroquieta			Regulated
Mountain View College	Valencia, Bukidnon		not applicable	Regulated
Golden Heritage Polytechnic College	Cagayan de Oro		not applicable	Regulated
Northwestern Mindanao Christian Colleges	Tudela, Misamis Occidental		not applicable	Regulated
Philippine College Foundation	Valencia, Bukidnon		not applicable	Regulated
Pilgrim Christian College	Cagayan de Oro		not applicable	Regulated
Quezon Institute of Technology	Quezon, Bukidnon		not applicable	Regulated
Sacred Heart College of Calamba	Calamba, Misamis Occidental		not applicable	Regulated
St. John Vianney Theological Seminary	Cagayan de Oro		not applicable	Regulated
St. Peter's College of Misamis Oriental	Balingasag		not applicable	Regulated
St. Rita's College of Balingasag	Balingasag		not applicable	Regulated
San Agustin Institute of Technology	Valencia, Bukidnon		not applicable	Regulated
San Isidro College	Malaybalay		not applicable	Regulated
Southern Bukidnon Foundation Academy	Don Carlos, Bukidnon		not applicable	Regulated
Southern Capital Colleges	Oroquieta		not applicable	Regulated
Southern De Oro Philippines College	Cagayan de Oro		not applicable	Regulated
Stella Maris College	Oroquieta		not applicable	Regulated
Valencia Colleges-Bukidnon	Valencia, Bukidnon		not applicable	Regulated
Xavier University (Ateneo de Cagayan)	Cagayan de Oro			Regulated
STI College-Cagayan De Oro	Cagayan de Oro		not applicable	Regulated
Philippine Countryville College	Maramag		not applicable	Regulated
Roman C. Villalon Memorial Colleges Foundation	Kibawe		not applicable	Regulated
Oro Bible College	Cagayan de Oro		not applicable	Regulated
Dr. Solomon U. Molina College	Oroquieta		not applicable	Regulated
Adventist Technological Institute	Jimenez, Misamis Occidental		not applicable	Regulated
Southern Maramag Colleges	Maramag		not applicable	Regulated
ACLC College of Bukidnon	Valencia, Bukidnon		not applicable	Regulated
IBA College of Mindanao	Valencia, Bukidnon		not applicable	Regulated
Misamis Oriental Institute of Science and Technology	Balingasag		not applicable	Regulated
The New El Salvador Colleges	El Salvador, Misamis Oriental		not applicable	Regulated
Our Lady of Triumph Institute of Technology	Ozamiz		not applicable	Regulated
Vineyard International Polytechnic College	Cagayan de Oro		not applicable	Regulated
Northwestern Mindanao Institute of Technology	Ozamiz		not applicable	Regulated
STI College-Iligan	Iligan		not applicable	Regulated
STI College-Malaybalay	Malaybalay		not applicable	Regulated
STI College-Valencia	Valencia, Bukidnon		not applicable	Regulated
North Central Mindanao College	Lala, Lanao Del Norte		not applicable	Regulated
Iligan Capitol College	Iligan		not applicable	Regulated
Iligan Medical Center College	Iligan		not applicable	Regulated
Adventist Medical Center College	Iligan		not applicable	Regulated
St. Michael's College	Iligan		not applicable	Regulated
St. Peter's College	Iligan		not applicable	Regulated
Santa Monica Institute of Technology	Iligan		not applicable	Regulated
Lyceum of Iligan Foundation	Iligan		not applicable	Regulated
Christ The King College De Maranding	Lala, Lanao Del Norte		not applicable	Regulated
Lanao School of Science and Technology	Lala, Lanao Del Norte		not applicable	Regulated
Masters Technological Institute of Mindanao	Iligan		not applicable	Regulated
Picardal Institute of Science and Technology	Iligan		not applicable	Regulated

== Davao Region ==
=== Government ===
Name	Type	Location	Year established	Year granted university status	Regulation status
Kapalong College of Agriculture Sciences and Technology	LUC	Kapalong		not applicable	Regulated
Governor Generoso College of Arts Sciences and Technology	LUC	Governor Generoso		not applicable	Regulated
Monkayo College of Arts Sciences and Technology	LUC	Monkayo		not applicable	Regulated
Kolehiyo ng Pantukan	LUC	Pantukan		not applicable	Regulated
Sto. Tomas College of Agriculture Sciences and Technology	LUC	Sto. Tomas, Davao del Norte		not applicable	Regulated
Samal Island City College	LUC	Samal, Davao Del Norte		not applicable	Regulated
Maco de Oro College	LUC	Maco		not applicable	Regulated
Davao del Norte State College	SUC Main	Panabo		not applicable	Regulated
Davao Oriental State University	SUC Main	Mati, Davao Oriental			Regulated
Southern Philippines Agriculture Business Marine and Aquatic School of Technology	SUC Main	Malita		not applicable	Regulated
University of Southeastern Philippines-Main	SUC Main	Davao City			Regulated
Davao del Sur State College-Main	SUC Main	Digos		not applicable	Regulated
Davao de Oro State College	SUC Main	Compostela, Davao de Oro		not applicable	Regulated
Davao Oriental State University-Cateel Extension Campus	SUC Satellite	Cateel			Regulated
Davao Oriental State University-San Isidro Campus	SUC Satellite	San Isidro, Davao Oriental			Regulated
Davao Oriental State University-Banaybanay Campus	SUC Satellite	Banaybanay			Regulated
University of Southeastern Philippines-College of Agriculture-Tagum Mabini	SUC Satellite	Tagum			Regulated
University of Southeastern Philippines-Mintal	SUC Satellite	Davao City			Regulated
University of the Philippines Mindanao	Constituent university of the national university system	Davao City	1995	1995 as a constituent university	Autonomous (by legislation)
Davao De Oro State College-Maragusan Branch	SUC Satellite	Maragusan		not applicable	Regulated
Davao De Oro State College-Montevista Branch	SUC Satellite	Montevista		not applicable	Regulated
Davao De Oro State College-New Bataan Branch	SUC Satellite	New Bataan		not applicable	Regulated

=== Private ===
Name	Location	Year established	Year granted university status	Regulation status
Agro-Industrial Foundation College of the Philippines-Davao	Davao City		not applicable	Regulated
AMA Computer College-Davao	Davao City		not applicable	Regulated
Arriesgado College Foundation	Tagum		not applicable	Regulated
Assumption College of Nabunturan	Nabunturan		not applicable	Regulated
Ateneo de Davao University	E. Jacinto St., Davao City			Autonomous (by evaluation)
Brokenshire College	Davao City		not applicable	Regulated
Cor Jesu College	Digos		not applicable	Deregulated (by evaluation)
Davao Central College	Davao City		not applicable	Regulated
Davao Doctors College	Davao City		not applicable	Regulated
Davao Medical School Foundation	Davao City		not applicable	Regulated
DMMA College of Southern Philippines	Davao City		not applicable	Regulated
Evelyn E. Fabie College	Davao City		not applicable	Regulated
General Baptist Bible College	Davao City		not applicable	Regulated
Holy Cross College of Calinan	Davao City		not applicable	Regulated
St. Mary'S College of Bansalan	Bansalan		not applicable	Regulated
Holy Cross of Davao College	Davao City		not applicable	Regulated
Liceo De Davao	Tagum		not applicable	Regulated
Mati Polytechnic College	Mati, Davao Oriental		not applicable	Regulated
MATS College of Technology	Davao City		not applicable	Regulated
Mindanao Medical Foundation College	Davao City		not applicable	Regulated
North Davao College-Tagum Foundation	Tagum		not applicable	Regulated
North Davao Colleges-Panabo	Panabo		not applicable	Regulated
Philippine Women's College of Davao	Davao City		not applicable	Regulated
Polytechnic College of Davao del Sur	Digos		not applicable	Regulated
Queen of Apostles College Seminary	Tagum		not applicable	Regulated
The Rizal Memorial Colleges	Davao City		not applicable	Regulated
Saint Francis Xavier College Seminary	Davao City		not applicable	Regulated
St. Mary's College of Tagum	Tagum		not applicable	Regulated
Saint Peter's College of Toril	Davao City		not applicable	Regulated
San Pedro College	Davao City		not applicable	Regulated
Serapion C. Basalo Memorial Colleges	Kiblawan		not applicable	Regulated
Southeastern College of Padada	Padada		not applicable	Regulated
South Philippine Adventist College	Matanao		not applicable	Regulated
Tecarro College Foundation	Davao City		not applicable	Regulated
University of Mindanao Bansalan College	Bansalan			Regulated
University of Mindanao Digos College	Digos			Autonomous (by evaluation)
University of Mindanao Panabo College	Panabo			Regulated
University of Mindanao Tagum College	Tagum			Deregulated (by evaluation)
University of Mindanao	Bolton Street, Davao City			Autonomous (by evaluation)
University of the Immaculate Conception	Davao City			Autonomous (by evaluation)
Joji Ilagan Career Center Foundation	Davao City		not applicable	Regulated
St. Francis Xavier Regional Major Seminary of Mindanao	Davao City		not applicable	Regulated
Assumption College of Davao	Davao City		not applicable	Regulated
Interface Computer College	Davao City		not applicable	Regulated
University of Mindanao Peñaplata College	Samal, Davao Del Norte			Regulated
Aces Tagum College	Tagum		not applicable	Regulated
St. John Paul II College of Davao	Davao City		not applicable	Regulated
Philippine College of Technology	Davao City		not applicable	Regulated
Mindanao Kokusai Daigaku	Davao City		not applicable	Regulated
Holy Child College of Davao	Davao City		not applicable	Regulated
Mati Doctors College	Mati, Davao Oriental		not applicable	Regulated
Southern Philippines Baptist Theological Seminary	Davao City		not applicable	Regulated
STI College-Davao	Davao City		not applicable	Regulated
Jose Maria College	Davao City		not applicable	Regulated
Christian Colleges of Southeast Asia	Davao City		not applicable	Regulated
Davao Winchester Colleges	Sto. Tomas, Davao Del Norte		not applicable	Regulated
Legacy College of Compostela	Compostela, Davao de Oro		not applicable	Regulated
St. Mary's College Baganga	Baganga, Davao Oriental		not applicable	Regulated
Holy Cross College of Sasa	Davao City		not applicable	Regulated
Laak Institute Foundation	Laak, Davao de Oro		not applicable	Regulated
Tagum Doctors College	Tagum		not applicable	Regulated
Gabriel Taborin College of Davao Foundation	Davao City		not applicable	Regulated
ACES Polytechnic College	Panabo		not applicable	Regulated
Davao Vision Colleges	Davao City		not applicable	Regulated
St. Thomas More School of Law and Business	Tagum		not applicable	Regulated
ACQ College of Ministries	Davao City		not applicable	Regulated
Koinonia Theological Seminary Foundation	Davao City		not applicable	Regulated
Evangelical Mission College	Davao City		not applicable	Regulated
Samson Polytechnic College of Davao	Davao City		not applicable	Regulated
Mt. Apo Science Foundation College	Davao City		not applicable	Regulated
Northlink Technological College	Panabo		not applicable	Regulated
Tagum City College of Science and Technology Foundation	Tagum		not applicable	Regulated
Institute of International Culinary and Hospitality Entrepreneurship Inc.	Davao City		not applicable	Regulated
Asian International School of Aeronautics and Technology	Davao City		not applicable	Regulated
Joji Ilagan International Management School	Davao City		not applicable	Regulated
Malayan Colleges Mindanao	Davao City		not applicable	Regulated
Card-MRI Development Institute	Tagum		not applicable	Regulated
Lyceum of the Philippines-Davao	Davao City		not applicable	Regulated
Maryknoll College of Panabo	Panabo		not applicable	Regulated
STI College-Tagum	Tagum		not applicable	Regulated
Philippine College of Technology-Calinan Campus	Davao City		not applicable	Regulated
Colegio de Caraga	Caraga, Davao Oriental		not applicable	Regulated
AMYA Polytechnic College	Davao City		not applicable	Regulated

== Soccsksargen ==
=== Government ===
Name	Type	Location	Year established	Year granted university status	Regulation status
Makilala Institute of Science and Technology	LUC	Makilala		not applicable	Regulated
Glan Institute of Technology	LUC	Glan, Sarangani		not applicable	Regulated
South Cotabato State College	SUC Main	Surallah		not applicable	Regulated
Cotabato Foundation College of Science and Technology	SUC Main	Arakan, Cotabato		not applicable	Regulated
Sultan Kudarat State University	SUC Main	Tacurong			Regulated
University of Southern Mindanao-Main	SUC Main	Kabacan			Regulated
Mindanao State University-General Santos	SUC Satellite	General Santos			Regulated
Cotabato Foundation College of Science and Technology-Antipas Campus	SUC Satellite	Antipas, Cotabato		not applicable	Regulated
Cotabato Foundation College of Science and Technology-Katipunan Campus	SUC Satellite	Sto. Nino, South Cotabato		not applicable	Regulated
Cotabato Foundation College of Science and Technology-Pikit Campus	SUC Satellite	Pikit		not applicable	Regulated
University of Southern Mindanao-Kidapawan City Campus	SUC Satellite	Kidapawan			Regulated
Sultan Kudarat State University-Isulan	SUC Satellite	Isulan			Regulated
Sultan Kudarat State University-Lutayan	SUC Satellite	Lutayan			Regulated
Sultan Kudarat State University-Kalamansig	SUC Satellite	Kalamansig			Regulated
Sultan Kudarat State University-Bagumbayan	SUC Satellite	Bagumbayan, Sultan Kudarat			Regulated
Sultan Kudarat State University-Palimbang	SUC Satellite	Palimbang			Regulated
Sultan Kudarat State University-Tacurong	SUC Satellite	Tacurong			Regulated

=== Private ===
Name	Location	Year established	Year granted university status	Regulation status
St. Alexius College	Koronadal		not applicable	Regulated
Edenton Mission College	Maitum		not applicable	Regulated
Gensantos Foundation College	General Santos		not applicable	Regulated
Holy Trinity College of General Santos City	General Santos		not applicable	Regulated
King's College of Marbel	Koronadal		not applicable	Regulated
Mindanao Polytechnic College	General Santos		not applicable	Regulated
Notre Dame of Dadiangas University	Maris St., General Santos City			Deregulated (by evaluation)
Notre Dame of Marbel University	Koronadal		1992	Regulated
Schola de San Jose	Polomolok		not applicable	Regulated
Ramon Magsaysay Memorial Colleges	General Santos		not applicable	Regulated
Santa Cruz Mission School	Lake Sebu, South Cotabato		not applicable	Regulated
STI College-Gen. Santos	General Santos		not applicable	Regulated
Green Valley College Foundation	Koronadal		not applicable	Regulated
Marbel School of Science and Technology	Koronadal		not applicable	Regulated
AMA Computer College-General Santos City	General Santos		not applicable	Regulated
Central Mindanao Colleges	Kidapawan		not applicable	Regulated
Regency Polytechnic College	Koronadal		not applicable	Regulated
Cotabato Medical Foundation College	Midsayap		not applicable	Regulated
Dr. Domingo B. Tamondong Memorial Hospital and College Foundation	Esperanza, Sultan Kudarat		not applicable	Regulated
King's College of Isulan	Isulan		not applicable	Regulated
Lebak Family Doctors' School of Midwifery	Lebak		not applicable	Regulated
Colegio de Kidapawan	Kidapawan		not applicable	Regulated
Notre Dame of Kidapawan College	Kidapawan		not applicable	Regulated
Notre Dame of Midsayap College	Midsayap		not applicable	Regulated
Notre Dame of Salaman College	Lebak		not applicable	Regulated
Notre Dame of Tacurong College	Tacurong		not applicable	Regulated
Quezon Colleges of Southern Philippines	Tacurong		not applicable	Regulated
St. Luke's Institute	Kabacan		not applicable	Regulated
Senator Ninoy Aquino College Foundation	Sen. Ninoy Aquino, Sultan Kudarat		not applicable	Regulated
Southern Baptist College	M'lang		not applicable	Regulated
Southern Christian College	Midsayap		not applicable	Regulated
Southern Mindanao Institute of Technology	Tacurong		not applicable	Regulated
Southern Philippines Methodist College	Kidapawan		not applicable	Regulated
Sultan Kudarat Educational Institution	Tacurong		not applicable	Regulated
North Valley College Foundation	Kidapawan		not applicable	Regulated
Central Mindanao Computer School	M'lang		not applicable	Regulated
Adventist College of Technology	Tupi, South Cotabato		not applicable	Regulated
Goldenstate College	General Santos		not applicable	Regulated
General Santos Doctors' Medical School Foundation	General Santos		not applicable	Regulated
Notre Dame-Siena College of Polomolok	Polomolok		not applicable	Regulated
Brokenshire College SOCSKSARGEN	General Santos		not applicable	Regulated
Holy Child College of Information Technology	Surallah		not applicable	Regulated
South East Asian Institute of Technology	Tupi, South Cotabato		not applicable	Regulated
VMC Asian College Foundation	Tacurong		not applicable	Regulated
Asian Colleges and Technological Institute	Kabacan		not applicable	Regulated
Stratford International School	General Santos		not applicable	Regulated
ACLC College of Marbel	Koronadal		not applicable	Regulated
Korbel Foundation College	Koronadal		not applicable	Regulated
STI College of Koronadal City	Koronadal		not applicable	Regulated
i-Link College of Science and Technology	Midsayap		not applicable	Regulated
Goldenstate College of Koronadal City	Koronadal		not applicable	Regulated
Marvelous College of Technology	Koronadal		not applicable	Regulated
STI College - Koronadal City - Tacurong City Branch	Tacurong		not applicable	Regulated
B.E.S.T. College of Polomolok	Polomolok		not applicable	Regulated
Ramon Magsaysay Memorial Colleges - Marbel	Koronadal		not applicable	Regulated
General Santos Academy	Polomolok		not applicable	Regulated
Marbel Institute of Technical College	Koronadal		not applicable	Regulated
Joji Ilagan International School of Hotel & Tourism Management	General Santos		not applicable	Regulated
North Point College of Arts and Technology	Kidapawan		not applicable	Regulated
MMG College of General Santos City	General Santos		not applicable	Regulated
Villamor College of Business and Arts	General Santos		not applicable	Regulated
Cronasia Foundation College	General Santos		not applicable	Regulated
Green Valley College Foundation - Isulan Campus	Isulan		not applicable	Regulated
Kidapawan Doctors College	Kidapawan		not applicable	Regulated
Kulaman Academy	Sen. Ninoy Aquino, Sultan Kudarat		not applicable	Regulated
Gensan College of Technology	General Santos		not applicable	Regulated
Primasia Foundation College	Alabel		not applicable	Regulated
Southpoint College of Arts and Technology	General Santos		not applicable	Regulated
West Celebes College of Technology	Lebak		not applicable	Regulated
Saint Albert Polytechnic College	Tacurong		not applicable	Regulated
Filipino Canadian Community College Foundation	General Santos		not applicable	Regulated
New Era University-General Santos City	General Santos			Regulated
Southern Philippine Technical College of Koronadal	Koronadal		not applicable	Regulated
Salaman Institute	Lebak		not applicable	Regulated
Goldenstate College of Kiamba	Kiamba, Sarangani		not applicable	Regulated
Goldenstate College of Maasim	Maasim		not applicable	Regulated
Goldenstate College of Malungon	Malungon		not applicable	Regulated
New Brighton School of the Philippines	General Santos		not applicable	Regulated
Pacific Southbay College	General Santos		not applicable	Regulated
Goodwill Colleges of North Eastern Philippines	Tacurong		not applicable	Regulated
King Solomon Institute	General Santos		not applicable	Regulated
Santo Niño College Foundation	Banga, South Cotabato		not applicable	Regulated
VMC Asian College of President Quirino	President Quirino, Sultan Kudarat		not applicable	Regulated
Envirogreen School of Technology	General Santos		not applicable	Regulated
New Hope School of Agriculture and Fishery	Polomolok		not applicable	Regulated

== National Capital Region ==
=== Government ===
Name	Type	Location	Year established	Year granted university status	Regulation status
City of Malabon University	LUC	Malabon			Regulated
City University of Pasay	LUC	Pasay	1994		Regulated
Colegio de Muntinlupa	LUC	Muntinlupa		not applicable	Regulated
Dr. Filemon C. Aguilar Memorial College of Las Piñas	LUC	Las Piñas	1998	not applicable	Regulated
Navotas Polytechnic College	LUC	Navotas		not applicable	Regulated
Pamantasan ng Lungsod ng Marikina	LUC	Marikina			Regulated
Pamantasan ng Lungsod ng Maynila	LUC	Intramuros, Manila	1965		Regulated
Pamantasan ng Lungsod ng Muntinlupa	LUC	Muntinlupa	2003		Regulated
Pamantasan ng Lungsod ng Pasig	LUC	Pasig			Regulated
Pamantasan ng Lungsod ng Valenzuela	LUC	Valenzuela City	2002		Regulated
Parañaque City College	LUC	Parañaque		not applicable	Regulated
Pateros Technological College	LUC	Pateros		not applicable	Regulated
Quezon City University	LUC	Quezon City	1994	not applicable	Regulated
Taguig City University	LUC	Taguig			Regulated
Universidad de Manila	LUC	Ermita, Manila	1995		Regulated
University of Caloocan City	LUC	Caloocan	1971		Regulated
University of Makati	LUC	Makati	1972		Regulated
Valenzuela City Polytechnic College	LUC	Valenzuela City		not applicable	Regulated
Development Academy of the Philippines	OGS	Pasig		not applicable	
Dr. Jose Fabella Memorial Hospital School of Midwifery	OGS	Sta. Cruz, Manila		not applicable	
National Defense College	OGS	Quezon City		not applicable	
Philippine Public Safety College	OGS	Taguig		not applicable	
Eulogio "Amang" Rodriguez Institute of Science and Technology	SUC Main	Sampaloc, Manila	1945	not applicable	Regulated
Marikina Polytechnic College	SUC Main	Marikina		not applicable	Regulated
Philippine Normal University-Main	SUC Main	Ermita, Manila	1901		Regulated
Philippine State College of Aeronautics-Main	SUC Main	Pasay	1969	not applicable	Regulated
Polytechnic University of the Philippines	SUC Main	Sta. Mesa, Manila	1904		Regulated
Rizal Technological University	SUC Main	Mandaluyong	1969		Regulated
Technological University of the Philippines-Manila	SUC Main	Ermita, Manila	1901		Regulated
University of the Philippines Diliman	Flagship constituent university of the national university system	Quezon City	1908		Autonomous (by legislation)
Polytechnic University of The Philippines-Open University	SUC Satellite	Sta. Mesa, Manila			Regulated
Polytechnic University of the Philippines-Parañaque Campus	SUC Satellite	Parañaque			Regulated
Polytechnic University of the Philippines-Quezon City Campus	SUC Satellite	Quezon City			Regulated
Polytechnic University of the Philippines-San Juan Campus	SUC Satellite	San Juan City			Regulated
Polytechnic University of the Philippines-Taguig	SUC Satellite	Taguig			Regulated
Rizal Technological University-Pasig	SUC Satellite	Pasig		not applicable	Regulated
Technological University of the Philippines-Taguig	SUC Satellite	Taguig			Regulated
University of the Philippines Manila	Constituent university of the national university system	Malate, Manila			Autonomous (by legislation)

=== Private ===
Name	Location	Year established	Year granted university status	Regulation status
Adamson University	900 San Marcelino Street, Ermita, Manila	1932		Autonomous
AMA Computer University	Quezon City	1980		Regulated
Arellano University-Manila	Sampaloc, Manila	1938		Regulated
Arellano University-Malabon	Malabon	1950		Regulated
Arellano University-Mandaluyong	Mandaluyong	1950	not applicable	Regulated
Arellano University-Pasay	Pasay	1945		Regulated
Arellano University-Pasig	Pasig	1946		Regulated
Asia Pacific College	Magallanes, Makati	1991	not applicable	Autonomous
Asian Institute of Journalism and Communication	Sampaloc, Manila		not applicable	Regulated
Asian Institute of Management	Makati	1968	not applicable	Regulated
Asian Institute of Maritime Studies	Pasay		not applicable	Regulated
Asian Social Institute	Malate, Manila		not applicable	Regulated
Asian Theological Seminary	Quezon City		not applicable	Regulated
Assumption College	San Lorenzo Drive, San Lorenzo Village, Makati		not applicable	Regulated
Ateneo de Manila University	Loyola Heights, Quezon City	1859		Autonomous
Ateneo School of Medicine and Public Health	Pasig	2007		Regulated
Ateneo de Manila University Graduate School of Business	Makati	1948		Regulated
Centro Escolar Las Piñas	Las Piñas		not applicable	Regulated
Centro Escolar University Makati	Makati			Autonomous
Centro Escolar University - Manila	No. 9 Mendiola St., San Miguel, Manila	1907		Autonomous
Chinese General Hospital Colleges	Sta. Cruz, Manila		not applicable	Regulated
CIIT College of Arts and Technology	Quezon City		not applicable	Regulated
Colegio de San Juan de Letran	Intramuros, Manila		not applicable	Deregulated
De La Salle-Araneta University	Malabon			Regulated
De La Salle University-Manila	2401 Taft Avenue, Malate, Manila	1911	1975	Autonomous
De La Salle-College of Saint Benilde	Taft Avenue, Malate, Manila	1988	not applicable	Autonomous
Don Bosco Technical College	Mandaluyong		not applicable	Regulated
Emilio Aguinaldo College	Paco, Manila	1973	not applicable	Autonomous
Far Eastern University	Nicanor Reyes Sr. St., Sampaloc, Manila	1928		Autonomous
FEU Alabang	Muntinlupa	2018		Regulated
FEU Diliman	Quezon City	1994		Regulated
FEU-Dr. Nicanor Reyes Medical Foundation	Quezon City	1971		Autonomous
FEU Institute of Technology	Sampaloc, Manila	1992		Autonomous
Far Eastern University - Makati	Makati	2010		Regulated
FEU Roosevelt - Marikina	Marikina	1933	not applicable	Regulated
FEATI University	Sta. Cruz, Manila	1946		Regulated
Information and Communications Technology Academy	Makati		not applicable	Regulated
Jose Rizal University	80 Shaw Blvd., Mandaluyong	1919		Autonomous
La Consolacion College-Manila	San Miguel, Manila	1902	not applicable	Regulated
Lyceum of the Philippines University	Muralla St., Intramuros, Manila	1952		Autonomous
Manila Central University	Caloocan	1904		Regulated
Manila Tytana Colleges	Pasay	1975	not applicable	Regulated
Manuel L. Quezon University	Quiapo, Manila	1947		Regulated
Mapua University	Muralla St., Intramuros, Manila	1925	2017	Autonomous
Mapua University - Makati	Makati			Regulated
Mary Chiles College	Sampaloc, Manila		not applicable	Regulated
Maryhill School of Theology	Quezon City		not applicable	Regulated
Meridian International College of Business and Arts	Taguig		not applicable	Regulated
Metropolitan Medical Center College of Arts Science and Technology	Sta. Cruz, Manila	1976	not applicable	Regulated
Miriam College	Katipunan Road, Loyola Heights, Quezon City	1926	not applicable	Autonomous
The National Teachers College	Quiapo, Manila	1928	not applicable	Regulated
National University	Sampaloc, Manila	1900		Autonomous
New Era University	Quezon City	1975		Regulated
Our Lady of Fatima University - Valenzuela	120 Mc Arthur Highway, Valenzuela City	1967		Autonomous
Our Lady of Fatima University - Quezon City	Lagro, Quezon City	1996		Autonomous)
PATTS College of Aeronautics	Parañaque	1969	not applicable	Regulated
Philippine Christian University	Malate, Manila	1946		Regulated
Philippine College of Health Sciences	Quiapo, Manila	1993	not applicable	Regulated
Philippine Merchant Marine School-Manila	Sta. Cruz, Manila		not applicable	Regulated
Philippine Merchant Marine School-Las Piñas	Las Piñas		not applicable	Regulated
Philippine School of Business Administration-Quezon City	Quezon City	1963	not applicable	Regulated
Philippine School of Business Administration-Manila	Sampaloc, Manila	1963	not applicable	Regulated
Philippine Women's University	Taft Ave., Malate, Manila	1919	not applicable	Deregulated
St. Jude College	Sampaloc, Manila	1968	not applicable	Regulated
St. Paul University Manila	680 Pedro Gil St., Malate, Manila	1912		Autonomous
St. Paul University Quezon City	Gilmore, Quezon City	1946		Regulated
St. Scholastica's College	Malate, Manila	1906	not applicable	Regulated
San Beda College-Alabang	Muntinlupa	1972	not applicable	Regulated
San Beda University	Mendiola, San Miguel, Manila	1901	2018	Deregulated
San Carlos Seminary	Makati	1702	not applicable	Regulated
San Sebastian College-Recoletos	Sampaloc, Manila	1941	not applicable	Regulated
Santa Isabel College of Manila	Ermita, Manila	1632	not applicable	Regulated
St. Luke's College of Medicine-William H. Quasha Memorial	Quezon City		not applicable	Regulated
Southville International School and Colleges	BF Homes International, Las Piñas		not applicable	Autonomous
Technological Institute of the Philippines	Quiapo, Manila	1962	not applicable	Autonomous
Technological Institute of the Philippines	Aurora Blvd, Cubao, Quezon City	1983	not applicable	Autonomous
Trinity University of Asia	275 E. Rodriguez Sr. Blvd., Quezon City	1963		Autonomous
University of Asia and the Pacific	Pasig	1967		Autonomous
The University of Manila	Sampaloc, Manila	1913		Regulated
University of Perpetual Help System DALTA	Las Piñas	1975		Autonomous
University of Santo Tomas	España, Sampaloc, Manila	1611		Autonomous
University of the East - Manila	Claro M. Recto Avenue, Sampaloc, Manila	1946		Autonomous
University of the East - Caloocan	Caloocan	1954		Deregulated
UERMMMC College of Medicine	Quezon City	1956		Regulated
UST Angelicum College	Quezon City	1972	not applicable	Regulated
ABE International Business College-Caloocan City	Caloocan		not applicable	Regulated
ABE International Business College-Cubao	Quezon City		not applicable	Regulated
ABE International Business College-Las Piñas	Las Piñas		not applicable	Regulated
Access Computer College-Camarin	Caloocan		not applicable	Regulated
Access Computer College-Cubao	Quezon City		not applicable	Regulated
Access Computer College-Lagro	Quezon City		not applicable	Regulated
Access Computer College-Manila	Quiapo, Manila		not applicable	Regulated
ACLC College of Commonwealth	Quezon City		not applicable	Regulated
ACLC College of Manila	Sampaloc, Manila		not applicable	Regulated
ACLC College of Marikina	Marikina		not applicable	Regulated
ACLC College of Taguig	Taguig		not applicable	Regulated
Air Link International Aviation College	Pasay		not applicable	Regulated
Alliance Graduate School	Quezon City		not applicable	Regulated
AMA Computer College-Caloocan	Caloocan		not applicable	Regulated
AMA Computer College-Fairview	Quezon City		not applicable	Regulated
AMA Computer College-Las Piñas	Las Piñas		not applicable	Regulated
AMA Computer College-Makati	Makati		not applicable	Regulated
AMA Computer College-Parañaque	Parañaque		not applicable	Regulated
AMA Computer College-Pasig City	Pasig		not applicable	Regulated
AMA Computer College-Sta. Mesa	Sta. Mesa, Manila		not applicable	Regulated
AMA School of Medicine	Makati		not applicable	Regulated
Asia Harvesters College and Seminary	Quezon City		not applicable	Regulated
Asian College	Quezon City		not applicable	Regulated
Asian Institute for Distance Education	Makati		not applicable	Regulated
Asian Institute of Computer Studies-Bicutan	Parañaque		not applicable	Regulated
Asian Institute of Computer Studies-Caloocan	Caloocan		not applicable	Regulated
Asian Institute of Computer Studies-Commonwealth	Quezon City		not applicable	Regulated
Asian Institute of Science and Technology	Quezon City		not applicable	Regulated
Bernardo College	Las Piñas		not applicable	Regulated
Bestlink College of the Philippines	Quezon City		not applicable	Regulated
Bethel Bible College of the Assemblies of God	Valenzuela City		not applicable	Regulated
Biblical Seminary of the Philippines	Valenzuela City		not applicable	Regulated
CAP College Foundation	Makati		not applicable	Regulated
Capitol Medical Center Colleges	Quezon City		not applicable	Regulated
Central Colleges of the Philippines	Quezon City	1954	not applicable	Regulated
Chiang Kai Shek College	Tondo, Manila	1965	not applicable	Regulated
Children of Mary Immaculate College	Valenzuela City	1978	not applicable	Regulated
Christ the King College of Science and Technology	Muntinlupa		not applicable	Regulated
Colegio de San Gabriel Arcangel of Caloocan	Caloocan		not applicable	Regulated
Colegio de Sta. Teresa de Avila Foundation	Quezon City		not applicable	Regulated
College of Arts and Sciences of Asia and the Pacific	Pasig		not applicable	Regulated
College of Divine Wisdom	Parañaque		not applicable	Regulated
College of Saint Amatiel	Malabon		not applicable	Regulated
College of St. Catherine	Quezon City		not applicable	Regulated
Concordia College	Paco, Manila		not applicable	Regulated
Criminal Justice College	Muntinlupa		not applicable	Regulated
Datamex College of Saint Adeline-Fairview	Quezon City		not applicable	Regulated
Datamex College of Saint Adeline-Parañaque	Parañaque		not applicable	Regulated
Datamex College of Saint Adeline-Valenzuela	Valenzuela City		not applicable	Regulated
De Ocampo Memorial College	Sta. Mesa, Manila		not applicable	Regulated
Diliman College	Quezon City		not applicable	Regulated
Divine Mercy College Foundation	Caloocan		not applicable	Regulated
Divine Word Mission Seminary	Quezon City		not applicable	Regulated
Don Carlo Cavina School	Las Piñas		not applicable	Regulated
Dr. Carlos S. Lanting College	Quezon City		not applicable	Regulated
Dominican College	San Juan City		not applicable	Regulated
Don Bosco School of Theology	Parañaque		not applicable	Regulated
Eclaro Academy	Quezon City		not applicable	Regulated
Electron College of Technical Education	Quezon City		not applicable	Regulated
Enderun Colleges	Taguig	2005	not applicable	Regulated
Entrepreneurs School of Asia	Quezon City		not applicable	Regulated
Febias College of Bible	Valenzuela City		not applicable	Regulated
Flight School International	Parañaque		not applicable	Regulated
Gardner College Diliman	Quezon City		not applicable	Regulated
Global City Innovative College	Makati		not applicable	Regulated
GK College of Business, Arts and Technology	Mandaluyong		not applicable	Regulated
Global Reciprocal Colleges	Caloocan		not applicable	Regulated
Golden Link College Foundation	Caloocan		not applicable	Regulated
Governor Andres Pascual College	Navotas City, Third District		not applicable	Regulated
Grace Christian College	Quezon City		not applicable	Regulated
Greenville College	Pasig		not applicable	Regulated
Guang Ming College	Malate, Manila		not applicable	Regulated
Guzman College of Science and Technology	Quiapo, Manila		not applicable	Regulated
Holy Rosary College Foundation	Caloocan		not applicable	Regulated
ICI Global University	Pasig			Regulated
IETI College-Alabang	Muntinlupa		not applicable	Regulated
IETI College of Science and Technology-Marikina	Marikina		not applicable	Regulated
Immaculada Concepcion College	Caloocan		not applicable	Regulated
Immaculate Heart of Mary College-Parañaque	Parañaque		not applicable	Regulated
Informatics Philippines-Manila	Sampaloc, Manila		not applicable	Regulated
Informatics Philippines-Northgate	Muntinlupa		not applicable	Regulated
Infotech College of Arts and Sciences Philippines	Pasig		not applicable	Regulated
Institute of Community and Family Health	Quezon City		not applicable	Regulated
Institute of Formation and Religious Studies	Quezon City		not applicable	Regulated
Integrated Innovation and Hospitality Colleges	Quezon City		not applicable	Regulated
Interface Computer College-Caloocan	Caloocan		not applicable	Regulated
Interface Computer College-Manila	Sampaloc, Manila		not applicable	Regulated
International Baptist College	Mandaluyong		not applicable	Regulated
International Graduate School of Leadership	Quezon City		not applicable	Regulated
Jesus Reigns Christian College Foundation	Malate, Manila		not applicable	Regulated
La Consolacion College-Caloocan	Caloocan		not applicable	Regulated
La Consolacion College-Novaliches	Caloocan		not applicable	Regulated
La Consolacion College-Pasig	Pasig		not applicable	Regulated
La Consolacion College-Valenzuela	Valenzuela City		not applicable	Regulated
Lacson College	Pasay		not applicable	Regulated
Lady of Lourdes Hospital & Colleges of Caybiga	Caloocan		not applicable	Regulated
La Verdad Christian College-Caloocan	Caloocan		not applicable	Regulated
Loral Douglas Woosley Bethany Colleges	Makati		not applicable	Regulated
Lyceum of Alabang	Muntinlupa		not applicable	Regulated
Makati Medical Center College	Makati		not applicable	Regulated
Makati Science Technological Institute of the Philippines	Sta. Mesa, Manila		not applicable	Regulated
Manila Adventist College	Pasay		not applicable	Regulated
Manila Business College Foundation	Sta. Cruz, Manila		not applicable	Regulated
Manila Law College	Sta. Cruz, Manila		not applicable	Regulated
Manila Theological College	Sampaloc, Manila		not applicable	Regulated
Marianum College	Muntinlupa		not applicable	Regulated
Marie-Bernarde College	Quezon City		not applicable	Regulated
Martinez Memorial College	Caloocan		not applicable	Regulated
Mary the Queen College of Quezon City	Quezon City		not applicable	Regulated
Messiah College Foundation	Mandaluyong		not applicable	Regulated
Metro Business College-Pasay	Pasay		not applicable	Regulated
Metro Manila College	Quezon City		not applicable	Regulated
Metropolitan Institute of Arts and Sciences	Caloocan		not applicable	Regulated
Mother of Life Center	Quezon City		not applicable	Regulated
NAMEI Polytechnic Institute	Mandaluyong		not applicable	Regulated
National Christian Life College	Marikina		not applicable	Regulated
National College of Business and Arts-Cubao	Quezon City		not applicable	Regulated
National College of Business and Arts-Fairview	Quezon City		not applicable	Regulated
National Polytechnic College of Science and Technology	Quezon City		not applicable	Regulated
NBS College	Quezon City		not applicable	Regulated
New England College	Quezon City		not applicable	Regulated
Olivarez College	Parañaque	1976	not applicable	Regulated
Our Lady of Guadalupe Colleges	Mandaluyong		not applicable	Regulated
Our Lady of Lourdes College	Valenzuela City		not applicable	Regulated
Our Lady of Lourdes Technological College	Quezon City		not applicable	Regulated
Our Lady of Perpetual Succor College	Marikina		not applicable	Regulated
Our Lady of the Angels Seminary	Quezon City		not applicable	Regulated
PACE Graduate School of Christian Education	Quezon City		not applicable	Regulated
Pacific InterContinental College	Las Piñas		not applicable	Regulated
Pasig Catholic College	Pasig	1913	not applicable	Regulated
Perpetual Help College of Manila	Sampaloc, Manila		not applicable	Regulated
Philippine College of Criminology	Sta. Cruz, Manila	1954	not applicable	Regulated
Philippine Cultural College	Quezon City		not applicable	Regulated
Philippine Dominican Center of Institutional Studies	Quezon City		not applicable	Regulated
Philippine Law School	Pasay		not applicable	Regulated
Philippine Rehabilitation Institute Foundation	Quezon City		not applicable	Regulated
PHILSIN College Foundation	Sta. Mesa, Manila		not applicable	Regulated
PMI Colleges-Manila	Sta. Cruz, Manila	1948	not applicable	Regulated
PMI Colleges-Quezon City	Quezon City	1948	not applicable	Regulated
Recoletos School of Theology	Quezon City		not applicable	Regulated
Regis Marie College	Parañaque		not applicable	Regulated
Republican College	Quezon City		not applicable	Regulated
Rogationist Seminary College of Philosophy	Parañaque		not applicable	Regulated
Romarinda International College	Quezon City		not applicable	Regulated
Saint Anthony Mary Claret College	Quezon City		not applicable	Regulated
Saint Bernadette College of Alabang	Muntinlupa		not applicable	Regulated
St. Bernadette of Lourdes College	Quezon City		not applicable	Regulated
St. Camillus College Seminary	Marikina		not applicable	Regulated
St. Clare College of Caloocan	Caloocan		not applicable	Regulated
St. Chamuel College	Taguig		not applicable	Regulated
St. Dominic Institute	Quezon City		not applicable	Regulated
St. Dominic Savio College	Caloocan		not applicable	Regulated
St. Francis Divine College	Quezon City		not applicable	Regulated
Saint Francis of Assisi College	Las Piñas		not applicable	Regulated
St. Francis Technical Institute	Caloocan		not applicable	Regulated
St. John of Beverly School	Quezon City		not applicable	Regulated
St. John Technological College of the Philippines	Quezon City		not applicable	Regulated
St. Joseph's College of Quezon City	Quezon City	1932	not applicable	Regulated
St. Louis College Valenzuela	Valenzuela City		not applicable	Regulated
St. Mary's College	Quezon City	1725	not applicable	Regulated
St. Rita College-Manila	Quiapo, Manila		not applicable	Regulated
St. Therese of the Child Jesus Institute of Arts and Sciences	Pasay		not applicable	Regulated
St. Vincent de Ferrer College of Camarin	Caloocan		not applicable	Regulated
Samson College of Science and Technology-Quezon City	Quezon City		not applicable	Regulated
San Juan de Dios Educational Foundation	Pasay		not applicable	Regulated
Sta. Catalina College	Sampaloc, Manila		not applicable	Regulated
Sapphire International Aviation Academy	Parañaque		not applicable	Regulated
School of Fashion and the Arts	Makati		not applicable	Regulated
Siena College	Quezon City	1959	not applicable	Regulated
South CompEdge College	Parañaque		not applicable	Regulated
Southeast Asia Christian College	Caloocan		not applicable	Regulated
Southeast Asian College	Quezon City		not applicable	Regulated
Southeastern College	Pasay		not applicable	Regulated
South Mansfield College	Muntinlupa		not applicable	Regulated
South SEED LPDH College	Las Piñas		not applicable	Regulated
Stella Maris College	Quezon City		not applicable	Regulated
Systems Plus Computer College-Caloocan	Caloocan		not applicable	Regulated
Systems Plus Computer College-Quezon City	Quezon City		not applicable	Regulated
STI College-Alabang	Muntinlupa		not applicable	Regulated
STI College-Bonifacio Global City	Taguig		not applicable	Regulated
STI College-Caloocan	Caloocan		not applicable	Regulated
STI College-Cubao	Quezon City		not applicable	Regulated
STI College-Fairview	Quezon City		not applicable	Regulated
STI College-Las Piñas	Las Piñas		not applicable	Regulated
STI College-Marikina	Marikina		not applicable	Regulated
STI College-Muñoz EDSA	Quezon City		not applicable	Regulated
STI College-Novaliches	Quezon City		not applicable	Regulated
STI College Pasay-EDSA	Malate, Manila		not applicable	Regulated
STI College-Shaw	Pasig		not applicable	Regulated
The Fisher Valley College	Taguig		not applicable	Regulated
The One Nation Entrepreneur School	Makati		not applicable	Regulated
Treston International College	Taguig		not applicable	Regulated
UBIX Institute of Technologies	Muntinlupa		not applicable	Regulated
Unciano Colleges and General Hospital	Sta. Mesa, Manila		not applicable	Regulated
United Christian Academy College of Asia	Parañaque		not applicable	Regulated
Universal Colleges of Parañaque	Parañaque		not applicable	Regulated
Villagers Montessori College	Quezon City		not applicable	Regulated
WCC Aeronautical & Technological College-North Manila	Caloocan		not applicable	Regulated
Wesleyan College of Manila	Pasay		not applicable	Regulated
West Bay College	Muntinlupa		not applicable	Regulated
World Citi Colleges-Quezon City	Quezon City		not applicable	Regulated

== Cordillera Administrative Region ==
=== Government ===
Name	Type	Location	Year established	Year granted university status	Regulation status
Philippine Military Academy	OGS	Baguio		not applicable	
Abra State Institute of Science and Technology-Main	SUC Main	Lagangilang		not applicable	Regulated
Apayao State College-Main	SUC Main	Conner, Apayao		not applicable	Regulated
Benguet State University-Main	SUC Main	La Trinidad, Benguet			Regulated
Ifugao State University - Main	SUC Main	Lamut			Regulated
Kalinga State University - Main	SUC Main	Tabuk, Kalinga			Regulated
Mountain Province State University-Main	SUC Main	Bontoc, Mt. Province			Regulated
Abra State Institute of Science and Technology-Bangued	SUC Satellite	Bangued		not applicable	Regulated
Benguet State University-Bokod Campus	SUC Satellite	Bokod, Benguet			Regulated
Benguet State University-Open University	SUC Satellite	La Trinidad, Benguet			Regulated
Benguet State University-Buguias Campus	SUC Satellite	Buguias			Regulated
Ifugao State University - Lagawe Campus	SUC Satellite	Lagawe			Regulated
Ifugao State University - Potia	SUC Satellite	Alfonso Lista			Regulated
Mountain Province State University-Tadian	SUC Satellite	Tadian			Regulated
University of the Philippines Baguio	Constituent university of the national university system	Baguio	1921 as Vigan extension campus of the UP College of Liberal Arts; 1938 (transfer to Baguio); 1961 as a branch campus of UP Diliman	2002 as a constituent university	Autonomous (by legislation)
Kalinga State University-Dagupan	SUC Satellite	Tabuk, Kalinga			Regulated
Apayao State College-Luna	SUC Satellite	Luna, Apayao		not applicable	Regulated
Ifugao State University - Tinoc	SUC Satellite	Tinoc			Regulated
Kalinga State University-Rizal	SUC Satellite	Rizal, Kalinga			Regulated
Ifugao State University-Hapao	SUC Satellite	Hungduan			Regulated
Ifugao State University-Aguinaldo	SUC Satellite	Aguinaldo, Ifugao			Regulated

=== Private ===
Name	Location	Year established	Year granted university status	Regulation status
Abra Valley Colleges	Bangued		not applicable	Regulated
Baguio Central University	Baguio	1945	1977	Regulated
University of the Cordilleras	Governor Park Rd., Baguio	1946	2003	Autonomous (by evaluation)
Cordillera Career Development College	La Trinidad, Benguet		not applicable	Regulated
Divine Word College of Bangued	Bangued		not applicable	Regulated
Philippine Nazarene College	La Trinidad, Benguet		not applicable	Regulated
Pines City Colleges	Baguio	1969	not applicable	Regulated
Saint Louis College of Bulanao	Tabuk, Kalinga		not applicable	Regulated
Saint Louis University	A. Bonifacio Street, Baguio	1911	1963	Autonomous (by evaluation)
San Pablo Major Seminary	Baguio		not applicable	Regulated
Casiciaco Recoletos Seminary	Baguio		not applicable	Regulated
University of Baguio	Gen. Luna Road, Baguio City	1948	1969	Autonomous (by evaluation)
Easter College	Baguio	1906	not applicable	Regulated
Keystone College	Baguio		not applicable	Regulated
STI College-Baguio	Baguio		not applicable	Regulated
Baguio College of Technology	Baguio	1972	not applicable	Regulated
BVS College	La Trinidad, Benguet		not applicable	Regulated
Cordillera A+ Computer Technology College	Tabuk, Kalinga		not applicable	Regulated
AMA Computer College-Baguio	Baguio		not applicable	Regulated
Data Center College of the Philippines of Bangued-Abra	Bangued		not applicable	Regulated
Kalinga Colleges of Science and Technology	Tabuk, Kalinga		not applicable	Regulated
Data Center College of the Philippines of Baguio City	Baguio		not applicable	Regulated
King's College of the Philippines-Benguet	La Trinidad, Benguet		not applicable	Regulated
Saint Tonis College	Tabuk, Kalinga		not applicable	Regulated
BSBT College	Baguio		not applicable	Regulated
Xijen College of Mt. Province	Bontoc, Mt. Province		not applicable	Regulated
Remnant International College	Baguio		not applicable	Regulated
International School of Asia and the Pacific	Tabuk, Kalinga		not applicable	Regulated
Philippine College of Ministry	La Trinidad, Benguet		not applicable	Regulated
Theological Foundation for Asia (Asia Pacific Theological Seminary)	Baguio		not applicable	Regulated
Star College	La Trinidad, Benguet		not applicable	Regulated

== Bangsamoro Autonomous Region in Muslim Mindanao ==
=== Government ===
Name	Type	Location	Year established	Year granted university status	Regulation status				
Hadji Butu School of Arts and Trades	OGS	Jolo, Sulu		not applicable					
Lanao Agricultural College	OGS	Lumbatan		not applicable					
Lapak Agricultural School	OGS	Siasi		not applicable					
Unda Memorial National Agricultural School	OGS	Masiu		not applicable					
Upi Agricultural School-Provincial Technical Institute of Agriculture	OGS	Upi, Maguindanao del Norte		not applicable					
Balabagan Trade School	OGS	Balabagan		not applicable					
Regional Madrasah Graduate Academy	OGS	Buluan		not applicable					
Cotabato State University	SUC Main	Cotabato City			Regulated				
Mindanao State University-Main Campus Marawi City	SUC Main	Marawi	-	Regulated	Tawi-Tawi Regional Agricultural College	SUC Main	Bongao	not applicable	Regulated
Adiong Memorial State College	SUC Main	Ditsaan-Ramain	1995 as Adiong Memorial Polytechnic College; 1999 as Adiong Memorial Polytechnic State College; 2022 as Adiong Memorial State College	not applicable	Regulated				
Basilan State University-Lamitan	SUC Satellite	Lamitan			Regulated				
Basilan State University-Maluso	SUC Satellite	Maluso			Regulated				
Basilan State University-Sta. Clara	SUC Satellite	Lamitan			Regulated				
Basilan State University-Tipo-Tipo	SUC Satellite	Tipo-Tipo			Regulated				
Cotabato Foundation College of Science and Technology-Datu Montawal Campus	SUC Satellite	Datu Montawal		not applicable	Regulated				
Mindanao State University-Lanao National College of Arts and Trades	SUC Satellite	Marawi			Regulated				
Mindanao State University-Maguindanao	SUC Satellite	Datu Odin Sinsuat			Regulated				
Mindanao State University-Sulu Development Technical College	SUC Satellite	Jolo, Sulu			Regulated				
Mindanao State University-Tawi-Tawi College of Technology and Oceanography	SUC Satellite	Bongao			Regulated				
Tawi-Tawi Regional Agricultural College - Tarawakan	SUC Satellite	Bongao		not applicable	Regulated				
Tawi-Tawi Regional Agricultural College - Languyan	SUC Satellite	Languyan		not applicable	Regulated				
Tawi-Tawi Regional Agricultural College-Simunul	SUC Satellite	Simunul		not applicable	Regulated				
Tawi-Tawi Regional Agricultural College - Sibutu	SUC Satellite	Sibutu		not applicable	Regulated				
University of Southern Mindanao - Buluan	SUC Satellite	Buluan			Regulated				

=== Private ===
Name	Location	Year established	Year granted university status	Regulation status
De La Vida College	Cotabato City		not applicable	Regulated
Dr. P. Ocampo Colleges	Cotabato City		not applicable	Regulated
Headstart College of Cotabato	Cotabato City		not applicable	Regulated
Jamiatu Marawi Al-Islamia Foundation	Marawi		not applicable	Regulated
Jamiatu Muslim Mindanao	Marawi		not applicable	Regulated
Jamiatul Philippine Al-Islamia	Marawi		not applicable	Regulated
Mapandi Memorial College	Marawi		not applicable	Regulated
Marawi Capitol College Foundation	Marawi		not applicable	Regulated
Mindanao Capitol College	Cotabato City		not applicable	Regulated
Notre Dame Center For Catechesis	Cotabato City		not applicable	Regulated
Notre Dame Hospital and School of Midwifery	Cotabato City		not applicable	Regulated
Notre Dame University	Cotabato City			Regulated
Pacasum College	Marawi		not applicable	Regulated
St. Benedict College of Cotabato	Cotabato City		not applicable	Regulated
Shariff Kabunsuan College	Cotabato City		not applicable	Regulated
Mindanao Islamic Computer College	Marawi		not applicable	Regulated
STI College-Cotabato	Cotabato City		not applicable	Regulated
Datu Mala Muslim Mindanao Islamic College Foundation	Marawi		not applicable	Regulated
Antonio R. Pacheco College	Cotabato City		not applicable	Regulated
AMA Computer College-Cotabato City	Cotabato City		not applicable	Regulated
Bubong Marzok Memorial Foundation College	Marawi		not applicable	Regulated
Senator Ninoy Aquino College Foundation-Marawi	Marawi		not applicable	Regulated
Kutawato Darrusalam College	Cotabato City		not applicable	Regulated
Notre Dame RVM College of Cotabato	Cotabato City		not applicable	Regulated
Coland Systems Technology	Cotabato City		not applicable	Regulated
Academia de Tecnologia in Mindanao	Cotabato City		not applicable	Regulated
Jamiat Cotabato and Institute of Technology	Cotabato City		not applicable	Regulated
Gani L. Abpi College	Datu Piang, Maguindanao		not applicable	Regulated
Central Sulu College	Siasi		not applicable	Regulated
Notre Dame of Jolo College	Jolo, Sulu		not applicable	Regulated
Parang Foundation College	Parang, Maguindanao del Norte		not applicable	Regulated
Shariff Kabunsuan College (Annex)	Parang, Maguindanao del Norte		not applicable	Regulated
Sultan Kudarat Islamic Academy Foundation College	Sultan Kudarat, Maguindanao del Norte		not applicable	Regulated
Del Sur Good Shepherd College	Wao, Lanao del Sur		not applicable	Regulated
Southwestern Mindanao Islamic Institute	Jolo, Sulu		not applicable	Regulated
Tawi-Tawi School of Midwifery	Bongao		not applicable	Regulated
Abubakar Computer Learning Center Foundation	Bongao		not applicable	Regulated
Lanao Educational Institute	Malabang		not applicable	Regulated
Mahardika Institute of Technology	Bongao		not applicable	Regulated
Dansalan Polytechnic College	Marawi		not applicable	Regulated
Philippine Muslim Teachers' College	Marawi		not applicable	Regulated
SAL Foundation College	Parang, Maguindanao del Norte		not applicable	Regulated
Mindanao Autonomous College Foundation	Lamitan		not applicable	Regulated
SPA College	Datu Piang, Maguindanao		not applicable	Regulated
Datu Ibrahim Paglas Memorial College	Datu Paglas		not applicable	Regulated
Cali Paramedical College Foundation	Marawi		not applicable	Regulated
Masiricampo Abantas Memorial Educational Center	Marawi		not applicable	Regulated
Marawi Islamic College	Marawi		not applicable	Regulated
Saffrullah M. Dipatuan Foundation Academy	Marawi		not applicable	Regulated
South Upi College	South Upi		not applicable	Regulated
St. Benedict College of Maguindanao	Parang, Maguindanao del Norte		not applicable	Regulated
Mariam School of Nursing	Lamitan		not applicable	Regulated
Lanao Islamic Paramedical College Foundation	Marawi		not applicable	Regulated
Lake Lanao College	Marawi		not applicable	Regulated
Wisdom International School for Higher Education Studies	Marawi		not applicable	Regulated
Datu Blo Umpar Adiong Agricultural School Foundation	Marawi		not applicable	Regulated
Bai Malgen Mama College	Datu Odin Sinsuat		not applicable	Regulated
Eastern Kutawato College	Buluan		not applicable	Regulated
RC-Al Khwarizmi International College Foundation	Marawi		not applicable	Regulated
Mindanao Institute of Healthcare Professionals	Marawi		not applicable	Regulated
Hardam Furigay Colleges Foundation	Lamitan		not applicable	Regulated
Philippine Engineering and Agro-Industrial College	Marawi		not applicable	Regulated
Illana Bay Integrated Computer College	Parang, Maguindanao del Norte		not applicable	Regulated
Khadijah Mohammad Islamic Academy	Marawi		not applicable	Regulated
Iranun Foundation College	Kapatagan, Lanao del Sur		not applicable	Regulated
Lanao Central College	Marawi		not applicable	Regulated
Sulu College of Technology	Indanan, Sulu		not applicable	Regulated
Enthusiastic College	Buldon, Maguindanao del Norte		not applicable	Regulated
Hadji Datu Saidona Pendatun Foundation College	General Salipada K. Pendatun, Maguindanao del Sur		not applicable	Regulated
General Diamongun K. Mangondato College of Agriculture and Fisheries	Masiu		not applicable	Regulated
Al Bangsamoro Shari'ah and Professional Education College	Marawi		not applicable	Regulated
As-Salihein Integrated School Foundation	Tamparan		not applicable	Regulated
Mindanao Autonomous College Foundation-Maluso	Maluso		not applicable	Regulated
Jamiatu Dansalan Al-Islamia Foundation	Marawi		not applicable	Regulated
Muslim Mindanao Integrated College Academy	Marawi		not applicable	Regulated
Maranao Islamic Institute - Ma'Had Maranao Al-Islamie	Tamparan		not applicable	Regulated
Binnor Pangandaman Integrated College	Wao, Lanao del Sur		not applicable	Regulated
Colegio de Upi	Upi, Maguindanao del Norte		not applicable	Regulated
Lamitan Technical Institute	Lamitan		not applicable	Regulated
Mindanaoan Integrated Academy	Wao, Lanao del Sur		not applicable	Regulated
Universal College Foundation of Southeast Asia and the Pacific	Lamitan		not applicable	Regulated
Tamparan Populace Islamic College	Tamparan		not applicable	Regulated
Philippine Last Frontier College	Bongao		not applicable	Regulated
Iqra Development Academy	Tamparan		not applicable	Regulated
Asma Khadijah Islamic Academy	Picong, Lanao del Sur		not applicable	Regulated

== Caraga ==
=== Government ===
Name	Type	Location	Year established	Year granted university status	Regulation status
Hinatuan Southern College	LUC	Hinatuan		not applicable	Regulated
Agusan del Sur State University	SUC Main	Bunawan		not applicable	Regulated
Caraga State University-Main Campus	SUC Main	Butuan			Regulated
Surigao del Norte State University-Main	SUC Main	Surigao City		2022	Regulated
North Eastern Mindanao State University-Main	SUC Main	Tandag			Regulated
Caraga State University-Cabadbaran Campus	SUC Satellite	Cabadbaran			Regulated
Philippine Normal University-Mindanao Campus	SUC Satellite	Prosperidad			Regulated
Surigao del Norte State University-Del Carmen	SUC Satellite	Del Carmen, Surigao Del Norte		2022	Regulated
North Eastern Mindanao State University-Cagwait	SUC Satellite	Cagwait			Regulated
North Eastern Mindanao State University-Lianga	SUC Satellite	Lianga			Regulated
North Eastern Mindanao State University-Tagbina	SUC Satellite	Tagbina			Regulated
North Eastern Mindanao State University-San Miguel	SUC Satellite	San Miguel, Surigao Del Sur			Regulated
North Eastern Mindanao State University-Cantilan	SUC Satellite	Cantilan			Regulated
University of Southeastern Philippines-Bislig Campus	SUC Satellite	Bislig			Regulated
Surigao del Norte State University-Malimono	SUC Satellite	Malimono		2022	Regulated
Surigao del Norte State University-Mainit	SUC Satellite	Mainit		2022	Regulated

=== Private ===
Name	Location	Year established	Year granted university status	Regulation status
Agusan Colleges	Butuan		not applicable	Regulated
Agusan del Sur College	Bayugan		not applicable	Regulated
Asian College Foundation	Butuan		not applicable	Regulated
Butuan City Colleges	Butuan		not applicable	Regulated
Butuan Doctors' College	Butuan		not applicable	Regulated
Don Jose Ecleo Memorial Foundation College of Science and Technology	San Jose, Dinagat Islands		not applicable	Regulated
Elisa R. Ochoa Memorial Northern Mindanao School of Midwifery	Butuan		not applicable	Regulated
Northern Mindanao Colleges	Cabadbaran		not applicable	Regulated
Northwestern Agusan Colleges	Nasipit		not applicable	Regulated
Saint Francis Xavier College	San Francisco, Agusan Del Sur		not applicable	Regulated
Saint Joseph Institute of Technology	Butuan		not applicable	Regulated
St. Jude Thaddeus Institute of Technology	Surigao City		not applicable	Regulated
San Francisco Colleges	San Francisco, Agusan Del Sur		not applicable	Regulated
St. Paul University Surigao	Surigao City			Regulated
Surigao Education Center	Surigao City		not applicable	Regulated
Father Saturnino Urios University	Butuan			Regulated
Northeastern Mindanao Colleges	Surigao City		not applicable	Regulated
Andres Soriano Colleges of Bislig	Bislig		not applicable	Regulated
Saint Michael College-Cantilan	Cantilan		not applicable	Regulated
Saint Theresa College of Tandag	Tandag		not applicable	Regulated
Saint Vincent de Paul Diocesan College	Bislig		not applicable	Regulated
Southern Technological Institute of the Philippines	Bislig		not applicable	Regulated
Surigao Sur Colleges	Barobo		not applicable	Regulated
Siargao Island Institute of Technology	Dapa, Surigao Del Norte		not applicable	Regulated
Caraga Institute of Technology	Kitcharao		not applicable	Regulated
De La Salle John Bosco College	Bislig		not applicable	Regulated
Mt. Carmel College of San Francisco	San Francisco, Agusan Del Sur		not applicable	Regulated
Saint Michael College of Caraga	Nasipit		not applicable	Regulated
Southway College of Technology	San Francisco, Agusan Del Sur		not applicable	Regulated
Holy Child Colleges of Butuan City	Butuan		not applicable	Regulated
STI College-Surigao	Surigao City		not applicable	Regulated
Balite Institute of Technology-Butuan	Butuan		not applicable	Regulated
Saint Peter College Seminary	Butuan		not applicable	Regulated
Bucas Grande Foundation College	Socorro, Surigao Del Norte		not applicable	Regulated
ACLC College of Butuan City	Butuan		not applicable	Regulated
Philippine Electronics and Communication Institute of Technology	Butuan		not applicable	Regulated
Candelaria Institute of Technology of Cabadbaran	Cabadbaran		not applicable	Regulated
Surigao Doctors' College	Surigao City		not applicable	Regulated
Merchant Marine Academy of Caraga	Butuan		not applicable	Regulated
Caraga School of Business	Bayugan		not applicable	Regulated

== MIMAROPA ==
=== Government ===
Name	Type	Location	Year established	Year granted university status	Regulation status
City College of Calapan	LUC	Calapan		not applicable	Regulated
Baco Community College	LUC	Baco, Oriental Mindoro		not applicable	Regulated
Pola Community College	LUC	Pola, Oriental Mindoro		not applicable	Regulated
Marinduque State University-Main Campus	SUC Main	Boac			Regulated
Mindoro State University-Main Campus	SUC Main	Victoria, Oriental Mindoro			Regulated
Occidental Mindoro State University	SUC Main	San Jose, Occidental Mindoro		2026	Regulated
Western Philippines University	SUC Main	Aborlan			Regulated
Palawan State University	SUC Main	Puerto Princesa			Regulated
Romblon State University-Main	SUC Main	Odiongan			Regulated
Marinduque State University-Torrijos Campus	SUC Satellite	Torrijos, Marinduque			Regulated
Western Philippines University-El Nido	SUC Satellite	El Nido, Palawan			Regulated
Western Philippines University-Busuanga	SUC Satellite	Busuanga, Palawan			Regulated
Western Philippines University-Culion	SUC Satellite	Culion			Regulated
Western Philippines University-Quezon	SUC Satellite	Quezon, Palawan			Regulated
Western Philippines University-Rio Tuba	SUC Satellite	Bataraza			Regulated
Palawan State University-Narra	SUC Satellite	Narra, Palawan			Regulated
Palawan State University-Dumaran	SUC Satellite	Dumaran			Regulated
Palawan State University- Balabac	SUC Satellite	Balabac, Palawan			Regulated
Palawan State University-Bataraza	SUC Satellite	Bataraza			Regulated
Palawan State University-Sofronio Española	SUC Satellite	Sofronio Española			Regulated
Romblon State University-San Andres Campus	SUC Satellite	San Andres, Romblon			Regulated
Occidental Mindoro State University-Labangan Campus	SUC Satellite	San Jose, Occidental Mindoro			Regulated
Romblon State University-San Fernando Campus	SUC Satellite	San Fernando, Romblon			Regulated
Mindoro State University-Calapan City Campus	SUC Satellite	Calapan		not applicable	Regulated
Mindoro State University-Bongabong Campus	SUC Satellite	Bongabong			Regulated
Occidental Mindoro State University-Murtha Campus	SUC Satellite	San Jose, Occidental Mindoro			Regulated
Occidental Mindoro State University-Mamburao	SUC Satellite	Mamburao			Regulated
Occidental Mindoro State University-Sablayan Campus	SUC Satellite	Sablayan			Regulated
Marinduque State University-Gasan Campus	SUC Satellite	Gasan, Marinduque			Regulated
Marinduque State University-Sta. Cruz Campus	SUC Satellite	Sta. Cruz, Marinduque			Regulated
Palawan State University-Araceli	SUC Satellite	Araceli, Palawan			Regulated
Palawan State University- Brooke's Point	SUC Satellite	Brooke's Point			Regulated
Palawan State University-Coron	SUC Satellite	Coron, Palawan			Regulated
Palawan State University-Cuyo	SUC Satellite	Cuyo, Palawan			Regulated
Palawan State University-Quezon	SUC Satellite	Quezon, Palawan			Regulated
Palawan State University-Roxas	SUC Satellite	Roxas, Palawan			Regulated
Palawan State University-Taytay	SUC Satellite	Taytay, Palawan			Regulated
Romblon State University-Calatrava Campus	SUC Satellite	Calatrava, Romblon			Regulated
Romblon State University-San Agustin Campus	SUC Satellite	San Agustin, Romblon			Regulated
Romblon State University-Cajidiocan Campus	SUC Satellite	Cajidiocan			Regulated
Romblon State University-Sta. Fe Campus	SUC Satellite	Sta. Fe, Romblon			Regulated
Romblon State University-Sta. Maria Campus	SUC Satellite	Sta. Maria, Romblon			Regulated
Romblon State University-Romblon Campus	SUC Satellite	Romblon, Romblon			Regulated
Western Philippines University-Puerto Princesa	SUC Satellite	Puerto Princesa			Regulated
Palawan State University-New Ibajay El Nido	SUC Satellite	El Nido, Palawan			Regulated
Palawan State University-Rizal	SUC Satellite	Rizal, Palawan			Regulated
Polytechnic University of the Philippines-Bansud Campus	SUC Satellite	Bansud			Regulated
Polytechnic University of the Philippines-Sablayan Campus	SUC Satellite	Sablayan			Regulated
Palawan State University-Linapacan	SUC Satellite	Linapacan			Regulated
Palawan State University-San Rafael Puerto Princesa City	SUC Satellite	Puerto Princesa			Regulated
Romblon State University-San Jose Campus	SUC Satellite	San Jose, Romblon			Regulated
Palawan State University-San Vicente	SUC Satellite	San Vicente, Palawan			Regulated
Occidental Mindoro State University-Lubang Campus	SUC Satellite	Lubang, Occidental Mindoro		not applicable	Regulated

=== Private ===
Name	Location	Year established	Year granted university status	Regulation status
Abada College	Pinamalayan		not applicable	Regulated
Colegio De San Sebastian-Sablayan	Sablayan		not applicable	Regulated
Divine Word College of Calapan	Calapan		not applicable	Regulated
Divine Word College of San Jose	San Jose, Occidental Mindoro		not applicable	Regulated
Eastern Mindoro College	Bongabong		not applicable	Regulated
EMA EMITS College Philippines	Pinamalayan		not applicable	Regulated
Fullbright College	Puerto Princesa, Palawan			
Grace Mission College	Socorro, Oriental Mindoro		not applicable	Regulated
Holy Trinity University	Puerto Princesa			Regulated
St. Mary's College of Marinduque	Boac		not applicable	Regulated
Luna Goco Colleges-Calapan	Calapan		not applicable	Regulated
Palawan Polytechnic College	Puerto Princesa		not applicable	Regulated
Saint Augustine Seminary	Calapan		not applicable	Regulated
San Francisco Javier College	Narra, Palawan		not applicable	Regulated
Santa Cruz Institute-Marinduque	Sta. Cruz, Marinduque		not applicable	Regulated
Seminario De San Jose	Puerto Princesa		not applicable	Regulated
Educational Systems Technological Institute	Boac		not applicable	Regulated
CLCC Institute of Computer Arts & Technology	Calapan		not applicable	Regulated
Fullbright College	Puerto Princesa		not applicable	Regulated
Marinduque Midwest College	Gasan, Marinduque		not applicable	Regulated
Prince of Peace College	Puerto Galera		not applicable	Regulated
John Paul College	Roxas, Oriental Mindoro		not applicable	Regulated
San Lorenzo Ruiz Seminary	Odiongan		not applicable	Regulated
Clarendon College	Roxas, Oriental Mindoro		not applicable	Regulated
Mina de Oro Institute of Science and Technology	Victoria, Oriental Mindoro		not applicable	Regulated
Ark of the Covenant Montessori Chamber of Learning College	Victoria, Oriental Mindoro		not applicable	Regulated
Palawan Technological College	Puerto Princesa		not applicable	Regulated
Innovative College of Science and Technology	Bongabong		not applicable	Regulated
St. Anthony College-Calapan City	Calapan		not applicable	Regulated
Southwestern Institute of Business and Technology	Pinamalayan		not applicable	Regulated
Paradigm Colleges of Science and Technology	Roxas, Oriental Mindoro		not applicable	Regulated
Erhard Systems Technological Institute	Odiongan		not applicable	Regulated
Institute of Business Science and Medical Arts	Pinamalayan		not applicable	Regulated
Philippine Central Islands College Foundation	San Jose, Occidental Mindoro		not applicable	Regulated
ACLC College of Calapan	Calapan		not applicable	Regulated
Pinamalayan Maritime Foundation and Technological College	Pinamalayan		not applicable	Regulated
STI College-Puerto Princesa	Puerto Princesa		not applicable	Regulated
Erhard Science and Technological Institute-Oriental Mindoro	Gloria, Oriental Mindoro		not applicable	Regulated
Malindig Institute Foundation	Sta. Cruz, Marinduque		not applicable	Regulated
Southwestern College of Maritime Business and Technology	Calapan		not applicable	Regulated
San Brendan College	Taytay, Palawan		not applicable	Regulated

== Negros Island Region ==
=== Government ===
Name	Type	Location	Year established	Year granted university status	Regulation status
Bago City College	LUC	Bago, Negros Occidental		not applicable	Regulated
La Carlota City College	LUC	La Carlota City, Negros Occidental		not applicable	Regulated
Bacolod City College	LUC	Bacolod		not applicable	Regulated
Carlos Hilado Memorial State University-Main	SUC Main	Talisay, Negros Occidental			Regulated
Northern Negros State College of Science and Technology	SUC Main	Sagay City, Negros Occidental		not applicable	Regulated
Central Philippines State University-Main Campus	SUC Main	Kabankalan			Regulated
Carlos Hilado Memorial State University-Bacolod Campus	SUC Satellite	Bacolod			Regulated
Northern Negros State College of Science and Technology-Escalante	SUC Satellite	Escalante City, Negros Occidental		not applicable	Regulated
Northern Negros State College of Science and Technology-Calatrava	SUC Satellite	Calatrava, Negros Occidental		not applicable	Regulated
Carlos Hilado Memorial State University-Alijis	SUC Satellite	Bacolod			Regulated
Philippine Normal University-Cadiz	SUC Satellite	Cadiz, Negros Occidental			Regulated
Carlos Hilado Memorial State University -College of Fisheries-Binalbagan	SUC Satellite	Binalbagan			Regulated
Technological University of the Philippines-Visayas	SUC Satellite	Talisay, Negros Occidental			Regulated
Central Philippines State University-Cauayan Campus	SUC Satellite	Cauayan, Negros Occidental			Regulated
Central Philippines State University-Sipalay Campus	SUC Satellite	Sipalay			Regulated
Central Philippines State University-Moises Padilla Campus	SUC Satellite	Moises Padilla			Regulated
Central Philippines State University-Hinoba-an Campus	SUC Satellite	Hinoba-an			Regulated
Central Philippines State University-Candoni	SUC Satellite	Candoni			Regulated
Central Philippines State University-Ilog Campus	SUC Satellite	Ilog, Negros Occidental			Regulated
West Visayas State University-Himamaylan Campus Extension	SUC Satellite	Himamaylan			Regulated
Central Philippines State University-Hinigaran Campus	SUC Satellite	Hinigaran			Regulated
Central Philippines State University - Victorias City Campus	SUC Satellite	Victorias			Regulated
Central Philippines State University - San Carlos Campus	SUC Satellite	San Carlos, Negros Occidental			Regulated
Negros Oriental State University-Main Campus	SUC Main	Dumaguete			Regulated
Siquijor State College	SUC Main	Larena, Siquijor		not applicable	Regulated
Negros Oriental State University-Mabinay Institute of Technology	SUC Satellite	Mabinay, Negros Oriental			Regulated
Negros Oriental State University-Bais 1	SUC Satellite	Bais, Negros Oriental			Regulated
Negros Oriental State University-Guihulngan	SUC Satellite	Guihulngan City, Negros Oriental			Regulated
Negros Oriental State University -Bais II	SUC Satellite	Bais, Negros Oriental			Regulated
Negros Oriental State University-Bayawan	SUC Satellite	Bayawan			Regulated

=== Private ===
Name	Location	Year established	Year granted university status	Regulation status
Binalbagan Catholic College	Binalbagan		not applicable	Regulated
Mater Dei College-Silay City	Silay		not applicable	Regulated
Cabarrus Catholic College	Sipalay		not applicable	Regulated
Central Philippine Adventist College	Murcia, Negros Occidental		not applicable	Regulated
Colegio San Agustin-Bacolod	Bacolod		not applicable	Regulated
Colegio De Santa Rita De San Carlos	San Carlos, Negros Occidental		not applicable	Regulated
Southland College of Kabankalan City	Kabankalan		not applicable	Regulated
CEDAR College	Cadiz, Negros Occidental		not applicable	Regulated
Kabankalan Catholic College	Kabankalan		not applicable	Regulated
La Consolacion College-Bacolod	Bacolod		not applicable	Regulated
La Consolacion College-Isabela	Isabela, Negros Occidental		not applicable	Regulated
Mount Carmel College	Escalante City, Negros Occidental		not applicable	Regulated
John B. Lacson Colleges Foundation-Bacolod	Bacolod		not applicable	Autonomous (by evaluation)
Fellowship Baptist College of Kabankalan	Kabankalan		not applicable	Regulated
Sacred Heart Seminary (Bacolod) School	Bacolod		not applicable	Regulated
Saint John Mary Vianney Seminary College	San Carlos, Negros Occidental		not applicable	Regulated
North Negros College	Cadiz, Negros Occidental		not applicable	Regulated
Riverside College	Bacolod		not applicable	Regulated
Silay Institute	Silay		not applicable	Regulated
University of Negros Occidental-Recoletos	Bacolod			Regulated
University of Saint La Salle	La Salle Avenue, Bacolod			Autonomous (by evaluation)
Catholic Ming Yuan College	Murcia, Negros Occidental		not applicable	Regulated
College of Arts and Sciences of Asia and the Pacific-Bacolod City	Bacolod		not applicable	Regulated
Convention Baptist Bible College	Bacolod		not applicable	Regulated
Colegio de Sta. Ana de Victorias	Victorias		not applicable	Regulated
VMA Global College	Bacolod		not applicable	Regulated
STI West Negros University	Bacolod			Regulated
AMA Computer College-Bacolod	Bacolod		not applicable	Regulated
Tañon College	San Carlos, Negros Occidental		not applicable	Regulated
ABE International Business College-Bacolod City	Bacolod		not applicable	Regulated
I-Tech College-Bago City	Bago, Negros Occidental		not applicable	Regulated
Baptist Missionary Association Bible College	Talisay, Negros Occidental		not applicable	Regulated
BIT International College - Siquijor	Siquijor, Siquijor		not applicable	Regulated
Colegio De Santa Catalina De Alejandria	Dumaguete		not applicable	Regulated
Foundation University	Dumaguete			Regulated
Saint Francis College-Guihulngan	Guihulngan City, Negros Oriental		not applicable	Regulated
Saint Joseph College of Canlaon	Canlaon City, Negros Oriental		not applicable	Regulated
St. Paul University Dumaguete	L. Rovira Rd, Dumaguete			Autonomous (by evaluation)
Silliman University	Hibbard Avenue, Dumaguete			Autonomous (by evaluation)
Negros Maritime College Foundation	Sibulan		not applicable	Regulated
Saint Joseph Seminary College	Sibulan		not applicable	Regulated
Presbyterian Theological College	Dumaguete		not applicable	Regulated
Quezon Memorial Institute of Siquijor	Siquijor, Siquijor		not applicable	Regulated
Metro Dumaguete College	Dumaguete		not applicable	Regulated
Asian College of Science and Technology-Dumaguete	Dumaguete		not applicable	Regulated
Carmelite College - Siquijor	Siquijor, Siquijor		not applicable	Regulated
AMA Computer College-Dumaguete City	Dumaguete		not applicable	Regulated
Maxino College-Dumaguete	Dumaguete		not applicable	Regulated
La Consolacion College-Bais	Bais, Negros Oriental		not applicable	Regulated
Negros College	Ayungon		not applicable	Regulated
Diaz College	Tanjay		not applicable	Regulated
Villaflores College	Tanjay		not applicable	Regulated
STI College - Dumaguete	Dumaguete		not applicable	Regulated

== See also ==
- Higher education in the Philippines
- List of Jesuit educational institutions in the Philippines
- List of universities and colleges in Metro Manila
- List of universities and colleges in the Philippines by province
