= State Colleges and Universities Athletic Association =

Athletic organization in the Philippines

- Abbreviation: SCUAA
- Formation: 1953 (SCAA); 1970 (SCUAA)
- Legal status: Public organization
- Location: Philippines
- Members: 93 members
- Main organ: Executive Committee

The State Colleges and Universities Athletic Association (SCUAA) is an association of 93 institutions, conferences, organizations, and individuals that organizes the athletic programs of different state colleges and universities in the Philippines. SCUAA is one of the inter-collegiate sports associations in the Philippines, the union of seven major state colleges and universities in Metro Manila.

== History ==
The organization was established as State Colleges Athletic Association (SCAA) in 1953 encompassing the Philippine Normal College, Central Luzon Agricultural College, the Philippine College of Commerce, and the Philippine College of Arts and Trade.

Despite many years of challenges in the forefront, SCUAA was able to gain ground in various regions in the country through the creation of regional or satellite SCUAA, hence the establishment of a National SCUAA in the mid-1980s. Two years after, the first National SCUAA Olympics was held with member state colleges and universities from Regions I, IV, V, VIII, and NCR participating.

== Conferences ==
=== National Capital Region ===
Institution	Athletic nickname	Establishment	Color	Location
Philippine State College of Aeronautics	PSCA Iron Eagle	1969		Pasay
Eulogio "Amang" Rodriguez Institute of Science and Technology	EARIST Red Fox	1945		Manila
Marikina Polytechnic College	MPC Gears	1947		Marikina
Philippine Normal University	PNU Torch Bearer	1901		Manila and other locations
Polytechnic University of the Philippines	PUP Mighty Maroons	1904		Manila and other locations
Rizal Technological University	RTU Blue Thunder	1969		Mandaluyong and Pasig
Technological University of the Philippines	TUP Gray Hawks	1901		Manila and other locations

RTU is expected to host the 35th Season of SCUAA-NCR in November 2025.

=== Ilocos Region ===
The SCUAA-I Conference is composed of the six state universities and colleges (SUCs) in the Ilocos Region. It also included the SUCs in what is now the Cordillera Administrative Region (when it was still part of Region I).

The latest season of the SCUAA-I Conference was held at the Pangasinan State University.

Institution	Athletic nickname	Establishment	Color	Location
Mariano Marcos State University	MMSU Stallions	1969		Batac, Ilocos Norte
University of Northern Philippines	UNP Sharks	1965		Vigan City
Ilocos Sur Polytechnic State College	ISPSC Panthers	1998		Santa Maria, Ilocos Sur
North Luzon Philippines State College	NLPSC Tigers	2010		Candon City
Don Mariano Marcos Memorial State University	DMMMSU Stingers	1981		Bacnotan, La Union
Pangasinan State University	PSU Golden Lions	1979		Lingayen, Pangasinan

=== Cagayan Valley ===
The SCUAA II is one of the divisions of SCUAA which serves the region of Cagayan Valley. The host for the 2025 season was the Cagayan State University. Emerging as the champion for the 2025 season was the CSU Maroons, followed by ISU, NVSU, then QSC.

Institution	Athletic nickname	Establishment	Color	Location
Cagayan State University	CSU Athena	1978		Tuguegarao, Cagayan
Quirino State College	QSC Buffalos	1983		Diffun, Quirino
Nueva Vizcaya State University	NVSU Archers	1916		Bayombong, Nueva Vizcaya
Isabela State University	ISU Falcons	1978		Echague, Isabela
Philippine Normal University North Luzon	PNU NL Torch Bearer	1901		Alicia, Isabela

== SUC Olympic III – Central Luzon ==
Institution	Nickname	Status	Founded	Color	Location
Bulacan State University	BulSU Gold Gears	State	1904		Malolos, Bulacan
President Ramon Magsaysay State University	PRMSU Blue Jaguars	State	1910		Iba, Zambales
Philippine State College of Aeronautics	PhilSCA Iron Eagles	State	1967		Floridablanca, Pampanga
Nueva Ecija University of Science and Technology	NEUST Phoenix	State	1929		Cabanatuan
Tarlac State University	TSU Firefox	State	1906		Tarlac City, Tarlac
Tarlac Agricultural University	TAU Jets	State	1945	Green & White	Camiling, Tarlac
Pampanga State Agricultural University	PACers	State	1974	White/canary yellow/Brazilian green	Magalang, Pampanga
Central Luzon State University	CLSU Green Cobras	State	1907	Green and White	Muñoz, Nueva Ecija
Bataan Peninsula State University	BPSU Stallions	State	2007	Maroon & Gold	Balanga, Bataan
Aurora State College of Technology	ASCoT Dolphins	State	1993	Gold and White	Baler, Aurora
Philippine Merchant Marine Academy	PMMA Marines	State	1820		San Narciso, Zambales
Don Honorio Ventura State University	DHVTSU Wildcats	State	1861	Maroon and Gold	Bacolor, Pampanga
Bulacan Agricultural State College	BASC Reapers	State	1952		San Ildefonso, Bulacan

- host 2006 RMTU of Zambales Over-all Champion BulSU Gold Gears
- host 2007 CLSU of Muñoz City Over-all Champion BulSU Gold Gears
- host 2008 PAC of Pampanga Over-all Champion BulSU Gold Gears
- host 2009 TCA of Tarlac Over-all Champion BulSU Gold Gears
- host 2010 BulSU of Bulacan Over-all Champion BulSU Gold Gears
- host 2011 TSU of Tarlac Over-all Champion BulSU Gold Gears
- host 2012 RMTU of Zambales Over-all Champion BulSU Gold Gears
- host 2012 BPSU of Bataan Over-all Champion BulSU Gold Gears
- host 2013 NEUST of Nueva Ecija Over-all Champion BulSU Gold Gears
- host 2014 TCA of Tarlac Over-all Champion BulSU Gold Gears
- host 2015 PSAU of Pampanga Over-all Champion BulSU Gold Gears
- host 2016 PSAU of Pampanga Over-all Champion BulSU Gold Gears
- host 2017 BulSu of Bulacan Over-all Champion BulSU Gold Gears
- host 2018 TSU of Tarlac Over-all Champion BulSU Gold Gears
- host 2019 TSU of Tarlac Over-all Champion BulSU Gold Gears
- host 2022 TAU of Tarlac Over-all Champion BulSU Gold Gears
- host 2023 TAU of Tarlac Over-all Champion BulSU Gold Gears

BulSU Gold Gears is an overall champion for more than 18 consecutive years.

== STRASUC formerly SCUAA IV A & B ==
Institution	Nickname	Status	Founded	Color	Location
Batangas State University	BatStateU Red Spartans	State	1903	Red and White	Batangas City, Batangas
Cavite State University	CvSU Hornets	State	1906	Green and Gold	Indang, Cavite
Laguna State Polytechnic University	LSPU Lakers	State	1952	Light Blue	Santa Cruz, Laguna
Mindoro State University	Mindoro State University	State	1952	Green and Yellow	Bongabong, Oriental Mindoro
Palawan State University	PSU Bearcats	State	1903	Orange	Puerto Princesa, Palawan
Southern Luzon State University	SLSU Phoenix	State	1964	Green	Lucban, Quezon Province
Romblon State University	RSU Big Red	State	1914	Green	Odiongan, Romblon
University of Rizal System	URS Giants	State	1956 (2001)	Light Blue and Gold	Morong, Rizal
Occidental Mindoro State University	OMSU Fighting Rays	State	1966	Blue Yellow and White	San Jose, Occidental Mindoro
Western Philippines University	WPU SHARKS	State	1910	Light Blue	Aborlan, Palawan
Marinduque State University	MarSU	State	1952	Maroon	Boac, Marinduque
University of the Philippines Los Baños	UPLB Fighting Maroons	National	1909	UP Maroon and UP Forest Green	Los Baños, Laguna

- host 2003 RSC of Odiongan, Romblon; Over-all Champion CvSU Hornets
- host 2004 LSPC of Santa Cruz, Laguna
- host 2005 LSPC of Santa Cruz, Laguna
- host 2006 PSU of Puerto Princesa City, Palawan
- host 2007 MarSU of Boac, Marinduque; Over-all Champion CvSU Hornets
- host 2008 RSC of Odiongan, Romblon;
- host 2009 SLSU of Lucban, Quezon Province; Over-all Champion CvSU Hornets
- host 2010 CvSU of Indang, Cavite; Over-all Champion CvSU Hornets
- host 2011 RSU of Odiongan, Romblon; Over-all Champion CvSU Hornets
- host 2012 CvSU of Indang, Cavite; Over-all Champion PSU Bearcats
- host 2013 MinSCAT of Victoria, Oriental Mindoro; Over-all Champion PSU Bearcats
- host 2013–2014 BatStateU of Batangas City; Over-all Champion BatStateU Red Blades
- host 2014–2015 UP Los Baños, Laguna; Over-all Champion PSU Bearcats
- host 2015–2016 WPU of Aborlan, Palawan; Over-all Champion PSU Bearcats
- host 2016–2017 URS of Morong, Rizal
- host 2023-2024 PalSU of Puerto Princesa, Palawan; Over-all Champion PalSU Bearcats
- host 2024-2025 MarSU of Boac, Marinduque

== SCUAA V – Bicol Region ==
Institution	Nickname	Status	Founded	Color	Location
Bicol University	BUtanding	State	1969		Legazpi City, Albay
University of Camarines Norte	UCN Red Horses	State	1992		Daet, Camarines Norte
Sorsogon State University	SorSU Whalesharks	State	1907		Sorsogon City, Sorsogon
Catanduanes State University	CatSU KETCHUP CatSU	State	1961		Virac, Catanduanes
Dr. Emilio B. Espinosa Sr. Memorial State College of Agriculture and Technology	DEBESMSCAT	State	1952		Mandaon, Masbate
Central Bicol State University of Agriculture	CBSUA	State	1918		Pili, Camarines Sur
Partido State University	ParSU Cimmarons	State	1941		Goa, Camarines Sur
Polytechnic State University of Bicol	PSUB Blue Stallions	State	2021		Nabua, Camarines Sur
Southeast Asian University of Technology	SEAUTech Asteans	State	1911		Naga City, Camarines Sur

- host 2008 CSC of Virac, Catanduanes Over-all Champion BU
- host 2009 CSPC of Nabua, Camarines Sur Over-all Champion BU, 1st CNSC, 2nd CSPC

== SCUAA VI – Western Visayas Region ==
Institution	Nickname	Status	Founded	Color	Location
Aklan State University	ASU	State	1963		Banga, Aklan
Capiz State University	CapSU	State	1980		Roxas City, Capiz
Carlos Hilado Memorial State University	CHMSU	State	1954		Talisay, Negros Occidental
Central Philippines State University	CPSU	State	1946		Kabankalan City, Negros Occidental
Guimaras State College	GSC Maroons	State	1968		Buenavista, Guimaras
Iloilo Science and Technology University	ISAT-U Tradeans	State	1905		Iloilo City
Iloilo State College of Fisheries	ISCOF	State	1957		Barotac Nuevo, Iloilo
Northern Iloilo Polytechnic State College	NIPSC	State	1952		Estancia, Iloilo
Northern Negros State College of Science and Technology	NONESCOST	State	1998		Sagay, Negros Occidental
University of Antique	UA	State	1954		Sibalom, Antique
University of the Philippines Visayas	UPV Fighting Maroons	National	1947		Miagao, Iloilo
West Visayas State University	West Marals	State	1902		Iloilo City

- host 2009 WVSU of Iloilo Over-all Champion WVSU Eagles

== SCUAA VII – Central Visayas Region ==
Institution	Nickname	Status	Founded	Color	Location
Bohol Island State University	BISU	State	1998		Tagbilaran City, Bohol
Cebu Technological University	CTU Fighters	State	1911		Cebu City
Cebu Normal University	CNU	State	1902		Cebu City
Negros Oriental State University	NORSU	State	1907		Dumaguete
Siquijor State College	SSC	State	1920		Larena, Siquijor
University of the Philippines Cebu	UPC Fighting Maroons	National	2016		Cebu City

== SCUAA VIII – Eastern Visayas Region ==
Institution	Nickname	Status	Founded	Color	Location
Biliran Province State University	BiPSU Tigers	State	1972		Naval, Biliran
Eastern Samar State University	ESSU Praying Mantises	State	1960		Borongan, Eastern Samar
Eastern Visayas State University	EVSU Eagles	State	1907		Tacloban City, Leyte
Leyte Normal University	LNU Blue Jays	State	1921		Tacloban City Leyte
Palompon Institute of Technology	PIT Sea Lions	State	1964		Palompon, Leyte
Samar State University	SSU Kingfisher	State	1912		Catbalogan
Southern Leyte State University	SLSU Blue Marlins	State	2004		Sogod, Southern Leyte
Northwest Samar State University	NwSSU Lions	State	1959		Calbayog, Samar
University of Eastern Philippines	UEP Buffalo	State	1918		Catarman, Northern Samar
University of the Philippines Tacloban^{1}	UP Tacloban Fighting Maroons	National	1973		Tacloban City Leyte
Visayas State University	VSU Pythons	State	1924		Baybay, Leyte

- ^{1}After its withdrawal from the games years ago, UPVTC will once again compete in the next season of SCUAA.
- ^{2}The forestmen bowed out from the games after it was merged with TTMIST to create NwSSU.
- host 2006 season 22nd NIT of Naval, Biliran Over-all Champion
- host 2007 season 23rd TTMIST of Calbayog, Samar Over-all champion
- host 2008 season 24th SLSU of Sogod, Southern Leyte Over-all Champion PIT Mariners, 1st EVSU Hawks, 2nd ESSU Falcons
- host 2009 season 25th VSU of Baybay, Leyte Over-all Champion PIT Mariners, 1st EVSU Hawks, 2nd UEP Dolphins
- host 2011 season 27th UEP of Catarman, Northern Samar Over-all Champion UEP Dolphins, 2nd EVSU Hawks

== Mindanao Association State Colleges and Universities Foundation (MASCUF) ==
=== Zamboanga Peninsula ===
Institution	Nickname	Status	Founded	Color	Location
Basilan State University	BasSU	State	1984	Red and White	Isabela City, Basilan
Jose Rizal Memorial State University	JRMSU	State	2010	Navy Blue and Gold	Dapitan, Zamboanga del Norte
J.H. Cerilles State College	JHCSC	State	1995	Green and White	San Miguel, Zamboanga del Sur
Western Mindanao State University	WMSU Fighting Crimsons	State	1904	Crimson Red and White	Zamboanga City
Zamboanga Peninsula Polytechnic State University	ZPPSU Sealions	State	1905	Maroon and Gold	Zamboanga City
Zamboanga State College of Marine Sciences and Technology	ZSCMST Marines	State	1956	Aqua Blue and White	Zamboanga City

=== Northern Mindanao ===
Institution	Nickname	Status	Founded	Color	Location
Bukidnon State University	BSU WildAnts	State	1924	Navy Blue and White	Malaybalay, Bukidnon
Camiguin Polytechnic State College	CPSC	State	1995	Light Blue and Green	Mambajao, Camiguin
Central Mindanao University	CMU Babalos	State	1910	Green	Musuan, Maramag, Bukidnon
University of Science and Technology of Southern Philippines	USTP	State	1927 (as MUST)	Dark Blue and Yellow	Alubijid, Misamis Oriental
Mindanao State University – Iligan Institute of Technology	IIT Lions	State	1975		Iligan, Lanao del Norte
University of Northwestern Mindanao	UNM	State	1971		Tangub, Misamis Occidental

=== Davao Region ===
Institution	Nickname	Status	Founded	Color	Location
Davao del Norte State College	DNSC	State	1969		Panabo, Davao del Norte
Davao Oriental State College of Science and Technology	DOSCST	State	1989		Mati, Davao Oriental
Southern Philippines Agri-Business and Marine and Aquatic School of Technology	SPAMAST	State	1966		Malita, Davao del Sur
University of Southeastern Philippines	USeP Falcons	State	1978		Obrero (Main), Davao City
Polytechnic State College of Davao	PSCD	State	1986		Davao City
University of the Philippines Mindanao	UPM Fighting Maroons	National	1995	UP Maroon and UP Forest Green	Davao City

- host 2017 Regional SCUAA – DOSCST – Mati, Davao Oriental

  - Champion - DOSCST
  - 1st Runner-Up - USeP-A
  - 2nd Runner-Up - UP-Mindanao

=== Soccsksargen ===
Institution	Nickname	Status	Founded	Color	Location
Cotabato City State Polytechnic College	CCSPC Fortstone	State	1924		Cotabato City
Cotabato Foundation College of Science and Technology		State	1967		Arakan, South Cotabato
Sultan Kudarat State University	SKSU Moros	State	1990	Blue and Green	Tacurong, Sultan Kudarat
University of Southern Mindanao	USM Buffalos	State	1954	Green and Yellow	Kabacan, Cotabato

=== Caraga Region ===
Institution	Nickname	Status	Founded	Color	Location
Agusan del Sur State College of Agriculture and Technology	ASSCAT	State	1906		Bunawan, Agusan del Sur
Caraga State University	CarSU	State	1946	Green and Gold	Butuan, Agusan del Norte
North Eastern Mindanao State University	NEMSU	State	1992	Blue	Tandag, Surigao del Sur
Surigao State College of Technology	SSCT	State	1969	Red and Green	Surigao City, Surigao del Norte

=== Bangsamoro Autonomous Region in Muslim Mindanao ===
Institution	Nickname	Status	Founded	Color	Location
Adiong Memorial Polytechnic State College	AMPSC	State	1998		Ditsaan-Ramain, Lanao del Sur
Sulu State University	SSU	State	1982	Blue and Gold	Jolo, Sulu
Tawi-tawi Regional Agricultural College	TRAC	State	1975		Bongao, Tawi-Tawi
Mindanao State University	MSU Griffins	State	1961	Maroon and Gold	Marawi City, Lanao del Sur

- 2009 host BukSU of Bukidnon Over-all Champion

== See also ==
- Philippine Association of State Universities and Colleges
- Mindanao Association State Colleges and Universities Foundation
