= NITC =

NITC may refer to:

- National Institute of Technology Calicut, technical university in India
- National Iranian Tanker Company, Iran's oil tanker company
- New International Trade Crossing, new bridge between Canada and the United States of America

== See also ==
- NIT (disambiguation)
- NTC (disambiguation)
- Technology Business Incubator TBI-NITC, Kozhikode district, India
