= DNSC =

DNSC may refer to:

- Danish National Space Center
- Dansyl chloride
- Davao del Norte State College, a public college in New Visayas, Panabo City, Philippines
- Defense National Stockpile Center
- Doctor of Nursing Science
