= DOST Biliran =

Filipino research institute

DOST Biliran, officially called Biliran Provincial Science and Technology Center (DOST Biliran-PSTC) is one of the six provincial centers of the Department of Science and Technology Regional Office No. VIII (DOST-8). It is currently located inside the campus of Naval State University, PI Garcia St., Naval, Biliran, Philippines.

The PSTC was created by virtue of Republic Act 6959. "AN ACT ESTABLISHING PROVINCIAL CENTERS FOR SCIENCE AND TECHNOLOGY IN ALL PROVINCES OF THE PHILIPPINES AND APPROPRIATING FUNDS THEREFORE" signed by then President Corazon C. Aquino on July 31, 1990.

Blogsite: http://dostbiliranpstc.blogspot.com/
