= NTC =

NTC may refer to:

== Education ==
- Fort Irwin National Training Center, US Army training
- Luther W. New Jr. Theological College, Dehradun, India
- National Taitung Junior College, a college in Taitung County, Taiwan
- National Technology Council (Pakistan)
- National Teachers College, Philippines
- National Trade Certificate Foundation, Mauritius
- Nazarene Theological College (England)
- New Teacher Center, US
- Northcentral Technical College, US
- Northfleet Technology College, UK
- The Nautical Training Corps, UK

== Government ==
- National Telecommunications Commission, Philippines
- National Tracing Center, US firearms tracing facility
- National Transitional Council (Congo)
- National Transitional Council, Libya, August 2011–August 2012
- National Transport Commission, Australia
- White House National Trade Council, established by US President Trump

== Telecommunications ==
- Nepal Telecom
- NTC Televisión, Colombia

== Other uses ==
- Football South Australia National Training Centre, a programme and team for young soccer players in South Australia
- Nan Tan Computer, later Clevo
- National Transport Corporation, Mauritius
- National Trade Center, a skyscraper in Taichung, Taiwan
- National Tennis Centre (United Kingdom)
- National Textile Corporation, India
- Negative temperature coefficient, of e.g. a thermistor
- Nourseothricin, an antibiotic
- Nuclear Terrorism Convention

== See also ==
- National Takaful Company (disambiguation)
- National Tennis Centre (disambiguation)
