= 2002 Republic of the Congo constitutional referendum =

- 20 January 2002

Results
Choice	Votes	%
Yes	1,113,955	87.83%
No	154,375	12.17%
Valid votes	1,268,330	96.21%
Invalid or blank votes	49,908	3.79%
Total votes	1,318,238	100.00%
Registered voters/turnout	1,701,415	77.48%

A constitutional referendum was held in the Republic of the Congo on 20 January 2002, with results showed over 87% voted in favour with a voter turnout of 77.5%.

== Background ==
The proposed new constitution would make the country a presidential republic. It had been written in 2001 and approved by a National Transitional Council in 2002 before being put to a referendum. Changes from the old constitution increased presidential terms to seven years and abolished the post of Prime Minister. It established a bicameral legislature and instituted several requirements in order to be able to stand for President.

The government described the referendum as paving the way for elections and welcomed the results. However the opposition urged that voters boycott the referendum as they said that the new constitution would give too much power to the President. Human rights groups said that the referendum, which took place without international observers, had seen irregularities.

== Results ==
Choice	Votes	%
For	1,113,955	87.83
Against	154,375	12.17
Invalid/blank votes	49,908	-
Total	1,318,238	100
Source: African Elections Database
