= Southeast Asian University of Technology =

Public university in Camarines Sur, Philippines

- Pamantasang Pangteknolohiya ng Timog-Silangang Asya
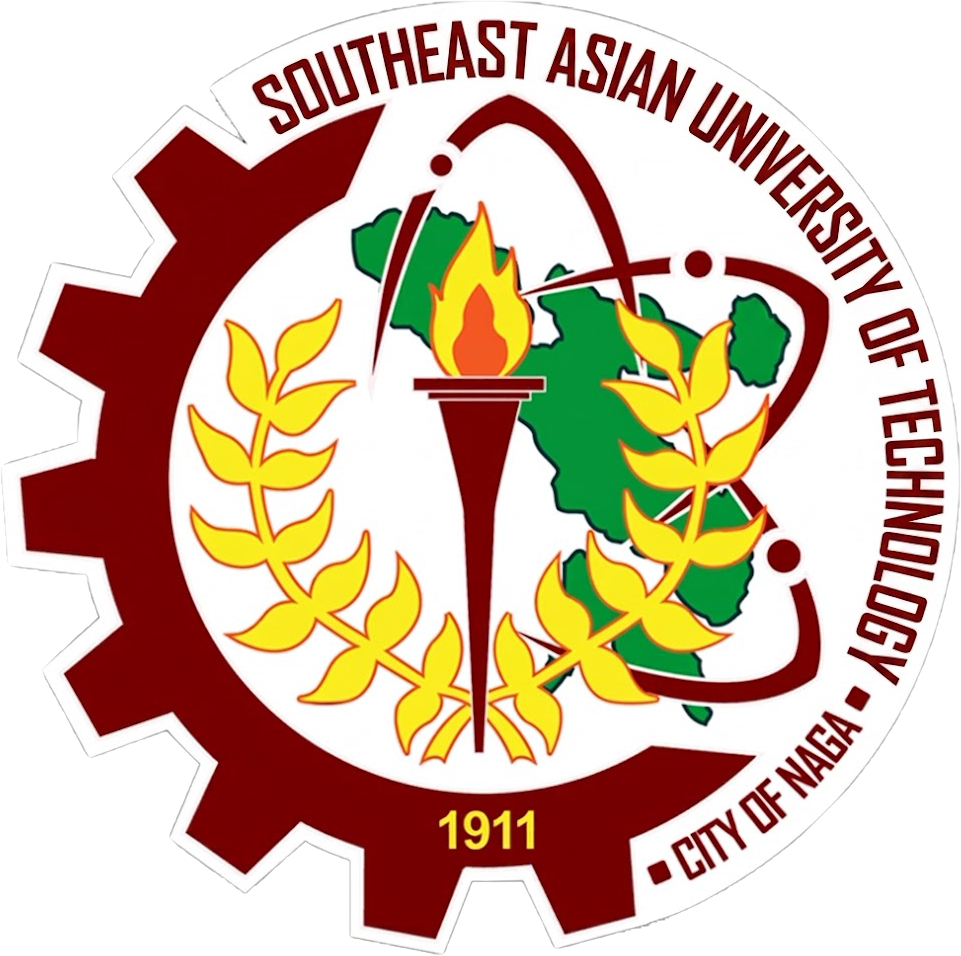
- Official Seal
- Former names: Camarines Sur Trade School (1911-1952); Camarines Sur School of Arts and Trades (1952); Camarines Sur National School of Arts and Trades (August 15, 1952); Camarines Sur National College of Arts and Trades (1952-1957); Bicol College of Arts and Trades (June 17, 1957-2002); Camarines Sur Polytechnic College (July 1, 2002-2012); Bicol State College of Applied Sciences and Technology (July 30, 2012-2024)
- Motto: Excellence, Innovation, and Service
- Type: State university
- Established: 1911
- Academic affiliations: PASUC; ASAIHL
- President: Alex H. Navarroza, Ph.D.
- Vice-president: Jake M. Laguador, Ph.D. (Academic Affairs); Analyn A. Madrid, Ph.D. (Administration and Finance)
- Dean: Roy D. Tipones, Ph.D. (College of Engineering); Jennifer Vibar, Ph.D. (College of Architecture and Design); Isidro R. Bola, Ph.D. (College of Trades and Technology); Ana Cristina R. Ursua, Ph.D. (College of Education); Apolonia C. Sebello, Ph.D. (College of Arts and Sciences); Jake M. Laguador, Ph.D. (Graduate School)
- Chairman of the Board: Secretary, Commission on Higher Education
- Faculty: 200+
- Students: 8,000+
- Undergraduates: 7,500+
- Postgraduates: 500+
- Location: Peñafrancia Avenue, Naga City, Camarines Sur, Bicol Region, Camarines Sur, Philippines; 13°37′56″N 123°11′31″E
- Campus: 6.35 acres (2.57 ha); Urban
- Student Media: The SEAUTech Collegian (Official Student Publication)
- Colors: Maroon and yellow
- Nickname: SEAUTech Eagles
- Sporting affiliations: SCUAA
- Mascot: Eagle
- Website: biscast.edu.ph
- Location in Luzon Location in the Philippines

The Southeast Asian University of Technology (SEAUTech), formerly known as the Bicol State College of Applied Sciences and Technology (BISCAST), is a public state university located in Naga City, Camarines Sur, Philippines. Established in 1911, it has evolved from a trade school into a comprehensive technological university serving the Bicol Region. The institution specializes in engineering, architecture, technology, education, and applied sciences, operating from its main campus along Peñafrancia Avenue.

== History ==
Logo of then Bicol State College of Applied Sciences and Technology

The institution's roots trace back to 1911 when it was established as the Camarines Sur Trade School (CSTS), initially offering intermediate-level courses in carpentry, drawing, and trade arts. Classes were first conducted in the Camarines Sur High School library hall, marking the beginning of technical education in the region. In 1924, under the leadership of Doroteo Federis, the school expanded its curriculum to include secondary-level vocational courses, significantly broadening its educational scope.

In 1925, a Gabaldon building was constructed on a 25,699-square-meter plot donated by the provincial government. This building, which still stands today, remains a cherished historical landmark on campus. The pre-war period saw further expansion under Principal Cornelio Casaclang, who introduced comprehensive woodworking courses to enhance the technical curriculum.

Following World War II, the school grew under the leadership of Primitiva Obias. The curriculum expanded to include auto mechanics, building construction, and furniture making. In 1948, the institution broke new ground by introducing girls' trades courses in dressmaking, cosmetology, and food trades. The school achieved national recognition on August 15, 1952, when House Bill No. 2919 (Republic Act 825) transformed it into the Camarines Sur National School of Arts and Trades (CSNSAT).

In 1967, through the Republic Act No. 5056, the institution was elevated to college status as the Bicol College of Arts and Trades (BCAT). The Bachelor of Science in Industrial Education (BSIE) program was introduced during this period. The 1970s and 1980s saw further growth with the launch of the Bachelor of Science in Industrial Technology (BSIT) in 1977 and the institution's selection as a pilot Technician Education Institute for Region V. In the 1990s, the institution began offering engineering programs, including Electrical, Electronics and Communications, Mechanical Engineering, and Architecture.

The modern era brought several institutional transformations. In 2002, the college integrated with Camarines Sur Polytechnic College, followed by its establishment as an independent institution (BISCAST) through Republic Act No. 10231 in 2012. The most recent evolution came with its elevation to university status as the Southeast Asian University of Technology.

== Administration ==
=== Administrative council ===
Name	Position
Alex H. Navarroza	SUC President II
Jake M. Laguador	Vice President for Academic Affairs
Analyn A. Madrid	Vice President for Administration & Finance
Roy D. Tipones	Dean, College of Engineering & Architecture
Isidro R. Bola	Dean, College of Trades & Technology
Ana Cristina R. Ursua	Dean, College of Education
Apolonia C. Sebello	Dean, College of Arts and Sciences
Ana Sheryl Lynn S. Catura	Director, Adv Educ. Services & Quality Assurance
Milano O. Torres	Director, Research, Extension & Production/Entrep. Dev’t./Institutional Planning Officer
Antonia Ricardo T. Ayen	Director, Student Development Services/Job Placement Coordinator
Maria Lourdes O. Padua	Director for Auxiliary Services
Eleanor Barsaga	Director Physical Plant Dev’t. & Maintenance Services/ Security and Management Officer
	Director Admin & Financial Management/Accountant II
Siemens A. Bonacua	Medical Officer III
Rochelle N. Oliquiano	Registrar III
Fe A. Gonzales	College Librarian III
Felicia E. Fortuna	Dentist II
Jundette D. Estadilla	Guidance Coordinator III
Myr-Al S. Sarto	Human Resource Management Officer III
Xiela Patrcia B. Azañes	Budget Officer II
Theresa V. Rodriguez	Cashier II
Josefa B. Boncacas	Supply Officer II
Sharifa S.J. Quincose	Internal Auditor I
Jo Anne B. Lopez	Human Resource Development Officer
Anabella C. Vilando	Institutional College Research Coordinator
Marivic D. Paghubasan	Institutional College Extension Coordinator
Analiza Mateo	Production Enterprise Development Coordinator
	Student Affairs Moderator
Geraldine C. Alvina	Publication Adviser
Francis Euste	NSTP Coordinator
Frank Porcil	Cultural Coordinator/Majorette Trainer
	Multi-Faith Coordinator
Salvador S. Berja	Band Director
Jeorge Fuentebella	Multimedia Hub Supervisor
Emily J. Berja	Sports Coordinator
	Entrepreneurship Training Center & Dormitory Services Manager
Joseph Vino Santiago	Information Communications Technology Manager
	GP Manager/Records Assistant
Ricardo C. Atole	Disaster Risk Reduction Management and Climate Change Focal Person
	Physical Planning Officer
Faye Sharon Almendral	GAD Focal Chairperson
	Eco- Friendly Program Focal Chairperson

== Academic programs ==
SEAUTech offers a comprehensive range of academic programs across multiple levels. At the graduate level, the university provides advanced degrees in Engineering with a focus on Electronics Engineering, as well as doctoral programs in Science Education, Language Education, and Mathematics Education. The graduate school also offers specialized master's programs in Technology and Livelihood Education and English Language Teaching, catering to educators and professionals seeking advanced qualifications.

The undergraduate curriculum is distributed across four major colleges. The College of Engineering and Architecture offers programs in Architecture, Civil Engineering, Electronics and Communications Engineering, Electrical Engineering, and Mechanical Engineering. The College of Education provides teacher training programs in Elementary Education and Secondary Education, with specializations in Mathematics, Science, and English, along with programs in Technology and Livelihood Education.

The College of Trades and Technology maintains the institution's historical focus on technical education, offering specialized programs in Automotive, Drafting, Electrical, Food, Garment, and Mechanical technologies. Meanwhile, the College of Arts and Sciences has expanded into contemporary fields with programs in Entertainment and Multimedia Computing, Exercise and Sport Sciences, Food Technology, and Entrepreneurship.

=== Abolished programs ===
- Secondary Trade School Curriculum (Laboratory High School)
- Cadet Corps Preparatory Military Training (CCPMT)

== Research and community engagement ==
SEAUTech has established itself as a center for technological innovation in the Bicol Region, conducting research in applied sciences, industrial technology development, and sustainable engineering solutions. The university maintains strong community ties through extension programs and technology transfer initiatives, contributing to regional development.

The university promotes holistic student development through comprehensive sports programs, cultural activities, and professional organizations. Modern facilities include engineering laboratories, technology research centers, digital learning spaces, and sports complexes, supporting both academic and extracurricular activities.

SEAUTech has also expanded its reach through international collaborations, maintaining partnerships with various institutions across Southeast Asia. These partnerships facilitate student exchange programs, research collaborations, faculty development initiatives, and technology transfer projects, positioning the university as a significant player in regional technological education.

== Student life ==
=== Recreation and wellness ===
BISCAST runs recreation and wellness programs to develop the well-being of its members, catering to their other skills/abilities and offer an avenue for its members to socially interact with each other while improving their physique or just enjoying their interests. The institution is home for different sports clubs for students, faculty and staff. They can also participate in the dance fitness program called Zumba. Facilities such as the student pavilion are also always open for these purposes.

=== Career services ===
Students can seek consultation on their career choices and plans to help them align it in their interests and goals.

=== Cadet Corps National Service Training Program (CCNSTP) ===
This organization comprises students who voluntarily undergo the National Service Training Program (NSTP) under the Reserve Officers' Training Corps (ROTC) component, in accordance with Republic Act No. 9163, also known as the NSTP Act of 2001. The training and administration of the Cadet Corps are supervised by the 502nd (CAS) Community Defense Center, under the 5th Regional Community Defense Group, Army Reserve Command, Philippine Army.

Graduates of the Basic ROTC program are enlisted into the Reserve Force of the Philippine Army pursuant to Republic Act No. 7077, otherwise known as the Citizen Armed Forces of the Philippines Reservist Act. Meanwhile, students who defer military training and instead opt to complete either of the two other NSTP components—Civic Welfare Training Service (CWTS) or Literacy Training Service (LTS)—are registered into the National Service Reserve Corps (NSRC).
