= Nit =

NiT, NIT, or Nits may refer to:

== Education ==
- Namgyal Institute of Tibetology, Sikkim, India
- Narula Institute of Technology, West Bengal, India
- National Institutes of Technology, India
- Naval Institute of Technology, Biliran, Philippines
- Nippon Institute of Technology, Japan
- Northern Institute of Technology Management, Germany
- Babol Noshirvani University of Technology, Iran

== Science and technology ==
- Nit, the egg case of a head louse
- Nit (unit), of luminance
- Nat (unit) or nit, natural unit of information
- Network Investigative Technique, computer malware used by the FBI

== Other uses ==
- National Invitation Tournament (NIT), American college basketball tournament
- Nature, Intentions, Time, Special Instructions (NITS), a form of emergency communication
- Nagpur Improvement Trust, India
- Nits (band), a Dutch musical group
- National Indigenous Times, indigenous Australian affairs newspaper
- Negative income tax
- Neith or Nit, ancient Egyptian goddess
- Norfolk International Terminals, facility of the Virginia Port Authority, US
- Notice inviting tenders, Indian equivalent of invitation to tender
- NIT, a former state TV channel in Moldova; see Media of Transnistria
- Former State of East Indonesia (Negera Indonesia Timur)
