= Iloilo Science and Technology University =

Public university in Iloilo City, Philippines

- Pamantasan sa Agham at Teknolohiya ng Iloilo (Filipino)
- Former names: Iloilo Trade School (1905–1939); Iloilo School of Arts and Trades (1939–1983); Western Visayas College of Science and Technology (1983–2013)
- Motto: Labor is Honor
- Type: State (public) basic and higher educational research university
- Established: 1905
- President: Dr. Gabriel M. Salistre, Jr.
- Vice-president: Dr. Corazon C. Corbal (VP for Academic Affairs); Dr. Russ Allen B. Napud (VP for Administration & Finance); Dr. Juniffer B. Badoles (VP for External Affairs); Dr. Carmelo V. Ambut (VP for Research & Extension)
- Students: ~15,000 (all campuses)
- Location: La Paz, Iloilo City, Philippines; 10°42′55″N 122°33′57″E
- Campus: Iloilo City, 6.25 ha (15.4 acres) (main); Miag-ao, 10.33 ha (25.5 acres); Barotac Nuevo; Dumangas; Leon
- Colors: Blue & gold
- Nickname: ISAT-U Tradeans
- Sporting affiliations: SCUAA
- Website: www.isatu.edu.ph
- Location in the Visayas Location in the Philippines

Iloilo Science and Technology University (also known as ISAT U or ISAT) is a state research university located in La Paz, Iloilo City, Philippines. Founded in 1905 under the American colonial government of the Philippines, it is mandated and chartered as a polytechnical university by the Philippine government to provide undergraduate and graduate courses in technology education, agriculture, fishery, engineering, arts and sciences, forestry, business, health, computer, criminology, nautical and short-term vocational-technical and other continuing courses. It attained its university status in 2013 renaming it to its present name, the Iloilo Science and Technology University (ISAT U).

As a public research university, ISAT U is also mandated to promote research, advanced studies, extension work and progressive leadership in its area of specialization. Its main campus is located in Burgos St., La Paz, Iloilo City with external campuses in Leon, Miag-ao, Barotac Nuevo, and Dumangas.

== History ==
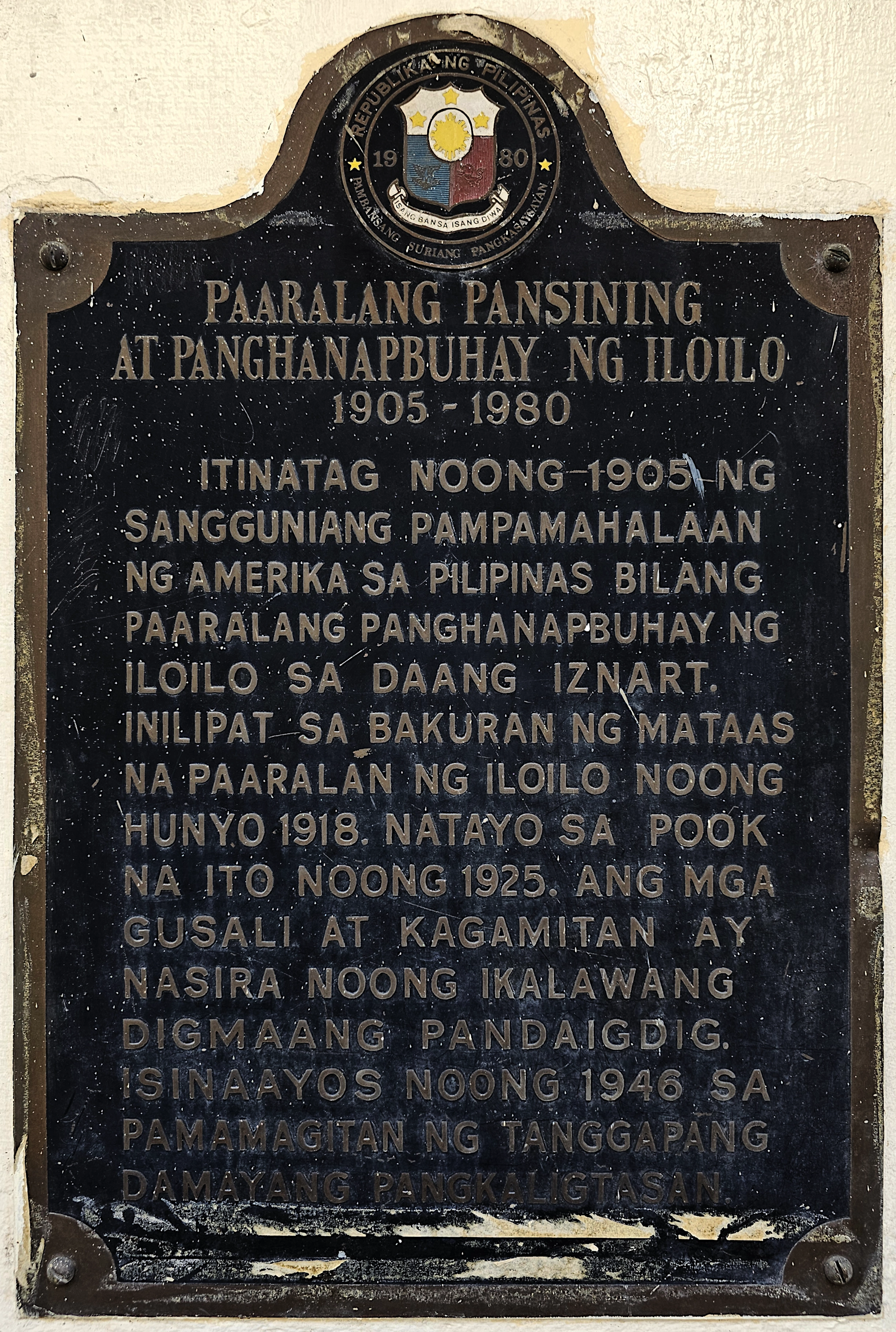
National historical marker installed in 1980

The Escuela de Artes y Oficios de Iloilo (Iloilo School of Arts and Trades) was inaugurated on October 7, 1891, with Don Cristobal Portas, an engineer of public works, serving as its first director. The school introduced electricity to Iloilo for the first time. However, the school closed in 1898. In 1905, the American colonial government established an elementary trade school known as the Iloilo Trade School on the same site.

By virtue of Commonwealth Act No. 313 in 1939, the school was converted into a National School of Arts and Trade with Iloilo School of Arts and Trades as its official name. In 1940, the school offered the Two-year Teacher Education Curriculum for the graduates of the secondary trade schools and Three-Year Education Curriculum for graduates in general high school.

In 1951, the school was authorized to open the degree of Bachelor of Science in Industrial Education (BSIE). The school was made a training center in the development of industrial arts program when the team of Industrial Educators from Stanford University arrived in 1957. In 1968, it also became a training center for implementation of the reconstructed manpower program of the National Manpower and Youth Council. In 1974, the Educational Development Project Implementation Task Force (EDPITAF) identified the school as the Regional Staff Development Center (RSDC) for Practical Arts in Western Visayas. It also pioneered in the implementation of the graduate program for vocational technical education in 1976 offering the degree Master of Arts in Teaching Vocational Education.

In May 1983, by virtue of Batas Pambansa Blg. 395, the school was converted into a chartered state college known as the Western Visayas College of Science and Technology.

The university acquired a 1.5-hectare (3.7-acre) lot across the road in addition to its present 4.75-hectare (11.7-acre) area that accommodates the main campus.

The college was elevated to a university in June, 2013 and changed its name to Iloilo Science and Technology University.

== Logo ==
ISAT U Logo symbols and meaning: Laurel fronds represents glory, honor, and success of the university. Atom stands for science and technology, which are the main thrust of the university. Gear represents technology and the history, traditions and identity of the university. Inside the gear, is the name Iloilo Science and Technology University in Times New Roman which was established in 1905. Book and torch, the open book symbolizes knowledge and power while the torch with the flame stands for enlightenment and wisdom. The text written inside the open book is the Republic Act No. 10595 which is an act converting Western Visayas College of Science and Technology (WVCST) into a State University to be known as Iloilo Science and Technology University (ISAT U). Industry represents the service where the graduates of the university are employed after completing the education.

== Publications ==
The Technovator is the official student publication of the university.

== Campuses and Colleges ==
The Iloilo Science and Technology University has five campuses to date.

- Iloilo Science and Technology University (ISAT U Iloilo City Campus (Main), Lapaz, Iloilo City, with 6 colleges namely:

College of Arts and Sciences (CAS)

College of Computing and Informatics (CCI)

College of Education (COE)

College of Engineering and Architecture (CEA)

College of Industrial Technology (CIT)

College of Global Business and Enterprise (CGBE)

- ISAT U Miagao Campus (Former: Southern Iloilo Polytechnic College-SIPC) - Miagao, Iloilo
- ISAT U Dumangas Campus (Former: Purification Dolar Monfort College-PDMC) - Dumangas, Iloilo
- ISAT U Barotac Nuevo Campus (Former: Don Jose Sustiguer Monfort Memorial National College-DJSMMNC) - Barotac Nuevo, Iloilo
- ISAT U Leon Campus (Former: Leon National College of Agriculture-LNCA) - Leon, Iloilo
