= Capiz State University =

Public university in Capiz, Philippines

- Pamantasang Pampamahalaan ng Capiz (Filipino)
- Other name: CapSU
- Former name: Panay State Polytechnic College (1980–2004)
- Motto: "Center of Academic Excellence Delivering Quality Service to All."
- Type: State university
- Established: January 4, 1981; 45 years ago
- Accreditation: AACCUP
- Academic affiliations: PASUC
- President: Dr. Efren L. Linan
- Vice-president: Dr. Mary Ann B. Martelino (VP for Administration & Finance); Dr. Annalie G. Campos (VP for Academic Affairs); Dr. Leo Andrew B. Biclar (VP for Research & Extension); Dr. Salvacion J. Legaspi (VP for External Affairs & Linkages)
- Location: Roxas City, Capiz, Philippines; 11°34′39″N 122°45′22″E
- Campus: Roxas City Main Campus; Burias Campus; Pontevedra Campus Satellite Colleges: List; Dayao Satellite College; Dumarao Satellite College; Mambusao Satellite College; Pilar Satellite College; Sapian Satellite College; Sigma Satellite College; Tapaz Satellite College
- Sporting affiliations: SCUAA
- Website: www.capsu.edu.ph
- Location in the Visayas Location in the Philippines

Capiz State University is a public research university in the Philippines. It is mandated to provide instruction and training in agriculture, fishery and forestry, science and technology, arts and humanities, education and other fields. It is also mandated to undertake research, extension services and production activities. The center of administration of the university is located in Roxas City.

== History ==
Batas Pambansang Blg. 191, signed by Pres. Ferdinand E. Marcos on December 24, 1980, merged the Mambusao Agricultural and Technical College (MATEC) and the Capiz Agricultural and Fishery School (CAFS) to become the Panay State Polytechnic College (PSPC).

Dr. Ernesto V. Botin took his oath of office as first PSPC president and was reappointed in 1986 by President Corazon C. Aquino and his term ended on July 24, 1993.

Dr. Kent De Pedro, the executive vice-president, served as OIC until the appointment of the second president, Dr. Rochellir D. Dadivas took effect on October 12, 1994.

On November 4, 1998, the Capiz Institute of Technology became an integral part of the system as approved in the 54th Regular Board Meeting held at the CHED Conference Room, San Miguel Avenue, Ortigas Center, Pasig; however, the official turnover was on October 25, 1999, while the Sigma College of Science and Technology was formally turned over on December 19, 2000.

On September 15, 2000, the Board of Trustees approved the new organizational structure of the college with three existing units, namely: the Roxas City Unit, the Mambusao Unit and the Pontevedra Unit. Each unit was headed by a chancellor.

The Mambusao Unit has six satellite campuses: the Burias Campus in Mambusao, Sapian Campus in Sapian, Tapaz Campus in Tapaz, Sigma Campus in Sigma, Dumarao Campus in Dumarao and Poblacion Mambusao Campus in Mambusao.

Pontevedra Unit has Pontevedra Campus in Pontevedra and Pilar Campus in Pilar while, the Roxas City Unit has the Roxas City Main Campus and the Dayao Campus.

Republic Act #9273 converted the Panay State Polytechnic College in the Province of Capiz into Capiz State University by President Gloria Macapagal Arroyo on March 21, 2004, at the Capiz Provincial Capitol, Roxas City, Capiz, Philippines.

On July 7, 2008, Dr. Editha L. Magallanes became the third president of the university and also the first lady president of the Capiz State University. In 2009, the chancellor positions of the three units were abolished and each campus was headed by a campus administrator.

The Center for Administration of the university was in Roxas City Campus while the Center for Academic Affairs was in the Mambusao, Poblacion Campus.

Capiz State University has ten sites located in the first and second districts of Capiz. In the First District of Capiz are the Roxas City Main Campus, Dayao Campus, Pontevedra Campus and Pilar Campus while in the Second District are the Poblacion Mambusao Campus, Burias Campus, Sapian Campus, Dumarao Campus, Sigma Campus and Tapaz Campus.

The governing body of the university is the Board of Regents which is composed of the CHED Commissioner as the chairperson, the University President as vice chairperson, Chairperson of the committee on education, arts and culture of the Senate, Chairperson of the Committee on Higher and Technical Education, House of Representatives, Regional Directors of NEDA. DOST and DA, Presidents of the Federation of the University Student Council, Faculty Federation, Alumni Association and two citizens as members.

== Campuses ==
=== ROXAS CITY MAIN CAMPUS ===
GRADUATE COURSES

- Doctor of Education
  - Major in Industrial Educational Management
- Master of Science in Criminal Justice
- Master of Science in Fisheries
- Master of Arts in Education
  - Major in: Home Economics, Industrial Arts, MAPEH, Educational Management
- Master in Public Administration

UNDERGRADUATE COURSES

- Bachelor of Science in Architecture
- Bachelor of Science in Civil Engineering
- Bachelor of Science in Electrical Engineering
- Bachelor of Science in Mechanical Engineering
- Bachelor of Secondary Education
  - Major in English, Filipino, Science
- Bachelor of Physical Education
- Bachelor of Technology and Livelihood Education
  - Major in: Home Economics, Industrial Arts
- Bachelor of Industrial Technology
  - Major in: Food Technology, Cosmetology, Auto Diesel Technology, Arch Draft Technology, Electrical Technology, Electronics Technology, Refrigeration and Air Conditioning Technology
- Bachelor of Science in Business Administration
  - Major in Marketing Management
- Bachelor of Science in Entrepreneurship
- Bachelor of Science in Accountancy
- Bachelor of Public Administration

SECONDARY LABORATORY HIGH SCHOOL

=== PONTEVEDRA CAMPUS ===
GRADUATE COURSES

- Doctor of Philosophy
  - Major in: Animal Science, Agronomy
- Doctor of Education
  - Major in Educational Management
- Doctor of Public Administration
- Master of Science in Agronomy
- Master of Science in Animal Science
- Master of Arts in Education
  - Major in: English, Filipino, Science, Social Science, Educational Management
- Master in Public Administration

UNDERGRADUATE COURSES

- Bachelor of Elementary Education
- Bachelor of Secondary Education
  - Major in English, Filipino, Math, Science, Social Studies
- Bachelor of Physical Education
- Bachelor of Science in Hospitality Management
- Bachelor of Science in Computer Science
- Bachelor of Science in Agricultural and Biosystems Engineering
- Bachelor of Science in Fisheries
- Bachelor of Science in Business Administration
  - Major in: Financial Management, Human Resource Management
- Bachelor of Science in Agriculture
  - Major in: Animal Science, Crop Science

=== BURIAS CAMPUS ===
GRADUATE COURSES

- Doctor of Public Administration
- Doctor of Philosophy
  - Major in: Agronomy, Animal Science
- Doctor of Education
  - Major in Educational Management
- Master of Science in Agronomy
- Master of Science in Animal Science
- Master of Arts in Education
  - Major in: English, Filipino, Science, Social Science, Educational Management
- Master in Public Administration

UNDERGRADUATE COURSES

- Bachelor of Secondary Education
  - Major in English, Filipino, Math, Science, Social Studies
- Bachelor of Elementary Education
- Bachelor of Physical Education
- Bachelor of Science in Agriculture
  - Major in: Agronomy, Animal Science, Horticulture, Soil Science
- Bachelor of Science in Agricultural and Biosystems Engineering
- Bachelor of Science in Business Administration
  - Major in: Financial Management, Marketing Management
- Bachelor of Public Administration

SECONDARY LABORATORY HIGH SCHOOL

=== DAYAO SATELLITE COLLEGE ===
UNDERGRADUATE COURSES

- Bachelor of Elementary Education
- Bachelor of Science in Criminology
- Bachelor of Science in Food Technology
- Bachelor of Science in Fisheries
- Bachelor of Science in Computer Science

=== DUMARAO SATELLITE COLLEGE ===
UNDERGRADUATE COURSES

- Doctor of Veterinary Medicine
- Bachelor of Elementary Education
- Bachelor of Secondary Education
  - Major in: Social Studies, Science
- Bachelor of Science in Criminology
- Bachelor of Science in Agriculture
  - Major in Animal Health

=== MAMBUSAO SATELLITE COLLEGE ===
UNDERGRADUATE COURSES

- Bachelor of Science in Computer Science
- Bachelor of Science in Food Technology
- Bachelor of Arts in English Language
- Bachelor of Science in Office Administration

=== PILAR SATELLITE COLLEGE ===
UNDERGRADUATE COURSES

- Bachelor of Science in Hospitality Management
- Bachelor of Elementary Education
- Bachelor of Science in Business Administration
  - Major in: Marketing Management, Human Resource Management
- Bachelor of Science in Social Works
- Bachelor of Science in Information Technology
- Bachelor of Science in Agriculture
  - Major in Agronomy

=== SIGMA SATELLITE COLLEGE ===
UNDERGRADUATE COURSES

- Bachelor of Science in Hospitality Management
- Bachelor of Science in Tourism Management
- Bachelor of Technical-Vocational Teacher Education
  - Major in: Electrical Technology, Automotive Technology, Food Service Mgt, Garments, Fashion and Design

=== TAPAZ SATELLITE COLLEGE ===
UNDERGRADUATE COURSES

- Bachelor of Elementary Education
- Bachelor of Secondary Education
  - Major in: Mathematics
- Bachelor of Science in Agriculture
  - Major in: Crop Science, Animal Science
