= National Aviation Academy of the Philippines =

Public college in Pasay, Philippines

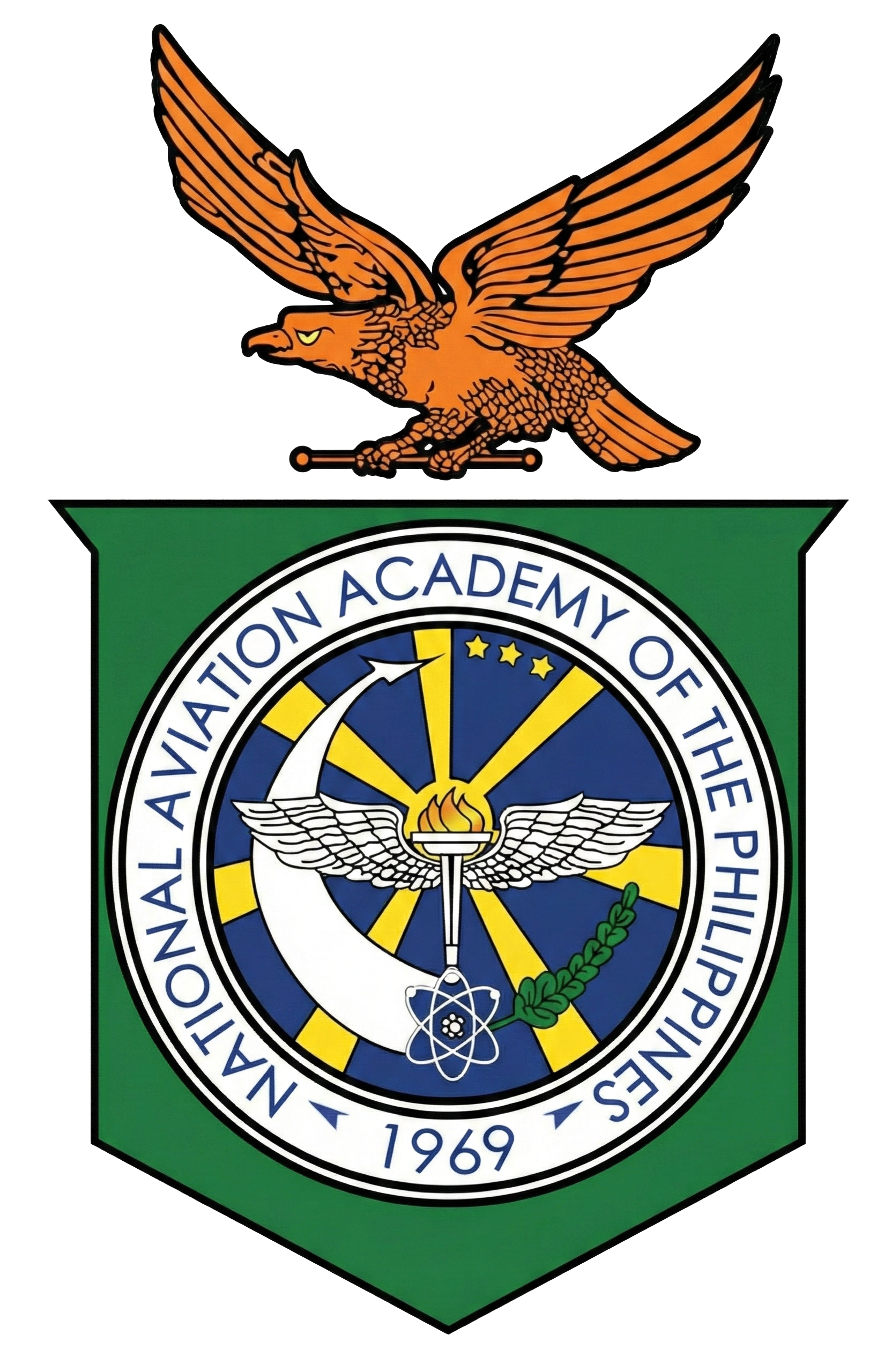
- Seal of the National Aviation Academy of the Philippines
- Former names: Basa Air Base Community College (1967–1977); Philippine Air Force College of Aeronautics (1977–1992); Philippine State College of Aeronautics (1992–2025)
- Type: State College, Aviation School
- Established: 1969; 57 years ago
- Affiliations: CHED; CAAP; CSC; COA; TESDA; PRC; SAEP; AACUP; PAF; SCUAA; UCLAA
- President: Marwin Dela Cruz
- Vice-president: List: Jeq Zyrius Sudweste (Academic Affairs); Maria Sisa Dela Cruz (Administration, Planning, and Finance)
- Dean: List: Divine Mae Magangan (Institute of Engineering and Technology); Alvin John Paz (Institute of Computer Studies); Luigi Reginald Resoles, (Institute of Liberal Arts and Sciences); Kristofer Neal Imperial (Institute of Graduate Studies); James Albert Obispo (Student Affairs)
- Director: Gerardo Zamudio, Jr. (Flying School)
- Location: Piccio Garden, Villamor, Pasay, Philippines (main campus); 14°31′36″N 121°01′25″E
- Campus: Urban, approx. 16,500 m²
- Hymn: "Oh NAAP Dear"
- Colors: Blue and White
- Nicknames: Philscans, Iron Eagle
- Website: naap.edu.ph
- Location in Metro Manila Location in Luzon Location in the Philippines

The National Aviation Academy of the Philippines (Tagalog: Pambansang Akademiyang Abyasyon ng Pilipinas / Spanish: Academia Aviación Nacional de Filipinas), also referred to by its acronym NAAP, formerly known as Philippine State College of Aeronautics (PhilSCA), is a state college in the Philippines specializing in aeronautics and aviation. Its main campus is in Pasay, Metro Manila, with other campuses located across the country: Floridablanca, Pampanga; Lipa, Batangas; and Lapu-Lapu City. It is the only institution in the Philippines that offers masters programs in aeronautical education and management.

== History ==
The school was initially established in 1968 as Basa Air Base Community College (BABCC) under AFP Regulation G.168-342 issued by the Armed Forces of the Philippines dated April 1968 under the Department of National Defense to address the problem plaguing the 5th Fighter Wing of the Philippine Air Force stationed at Basa Air Base, Floridablanca, Pampanga. The children and personnel then stationed in Basa could not pursue secondary and tertiary education as the nearest school offering them were located in Guagua, Pampanga, and Basa was still in the midst of an insurgency.

In 1977, the college established an annex in Nichols Air Base (currently Villamor Air Base) in Pasay known as BABC-Annex using the classroom of the Pasay City South High School for afternoon and evening classes.

In the same year, a satellite campus was established in Fernando Air Base in Lipa, Batangas.

Also in the same year, President Ferdinand E. Marcos signed Presidential Decree No. 1078 converting Basa Air Base Community College to Philippine Air Force College of Aeronautics (PAFCA) with its main campus at Villamor Air Base, Pasay, Metro Manila. Although with state college status, its charter did not provide for government subsidy as it was considered as a non-profit and non-stock educational institution. It was envisioned by Philippine Air Force authorities to be the Philippine Air Force Academy to solve its problem in the procurement and training of its officer pilots through the merging of the Philippine Air Force Flying School and the Philippine Air Force Regular Officer Procurement Program.

In 1979, another satellite campus was established in Mactan Benito Ebuen Air Base Campus in Lapulapu City in Mactan, Cebu.

On June 3, 1992, House Bill 26650 was signed into law as Republic Act. No. 7605 by then President Corazon C. Aquino converting Philippine Air Force College of Aeronautics into a state college known as the Philippine State College of Aeronautics (PhilSCA; [ˈfɪlskɐ]; Filipino: Kolehiyong Pampamahalaan sa Aeronautika ng Pilipinas)

In 1994, its Board of Trustees approved the creation of its own flight school that will train students for private pilot and commercial pilot. In 1997, it acquired its first trainer plane - a SOCATA TB-9C Tampico aircraft (RP-2200) which was donated by Senator Raul Roco from his country-wide development fund and another Tampico aircraft (RP-2204) was purchased for P10 million from PhilSCA Development Fund on June 3, 1992.

In 2009, Dr. Enerico M. Sampang was dismissed as College President of the Philippine State College of Aeronautics by the Office of the Ombudsman and immediately replaced by Atty. Carmelita Yadao-Sison, CHED Deputy Executive Director as an OIC (Office in Charge) of the Philippine State College of Aeronautics.

June 1, 2010, Dr. Bernard R. Ramirez, former Vice-President for Administration and Finance, was appointed as the new and 5th College President of the Philippine State College of Aeronautics replacing Atty. Carmelita Yadao-Sison as an OIC.

On July 8, 2010, the college was transferred from its original location at Manlunas St. Villamor Air Base, Pasay (currently Newport City) to its new site at Piccio Garden, Villamor, Pasay (in front of South Luzon Expressway Sales Exit)

On December 15, 2011, the PhilSCA-BAB campus made a groundbreaking ceremony of the newly donated lot for the relocation of the said campus at the Resettlement Area, in Floridablanca, Pampanga. When the said campus relocated to the new site, it was no longer BAB Campus, it became Basa-Palmayo Campus.

In 2012, PhilSCA was awarded by the Professional Regulation Commission (PRC) as the Number 1 Aeronautical School in the Country as it gained high percentage of board passers and for being Top 1 in the PRC Aeronautical Engineering Board Examination for almost 7 years in a row from 2004 until October 2012.

In June 2014, Governor Lilia Pineda inaugurated the new constructed two-storey building of the PhilSCA Basa-Palmayo campus funded by the local government of Pampanga through the approval of the Provincial Board Members.

The National Aviation Academy of the Philippines Act was passed by the Senate of the Philippines as Senate Bill No. 2969 on June 9, 2025, adopted by the House of Representatives as an amendment to House Bill No. 10403 on June 10, 2025 and was signed into law as Republic Act No. 12255 on September 5, 2025 by President Ferdinand R. Marcos Jr. declaring the Philippine State College of Aeronautics as the national professional institution for aviation and therefore renaming it as the National Aviation Academy of the Philippines (NAAP)..

=== Former names ===
- Basa Air Base Community College (June 1969 – January 26, 1977)
- Philippine Air Force College of Aeronautics (January 26, 1977 – June 3, 1992)
- Philippine State College of Aeronautics (June 3, 1992 – September 5, 2025)

== Campuses ==
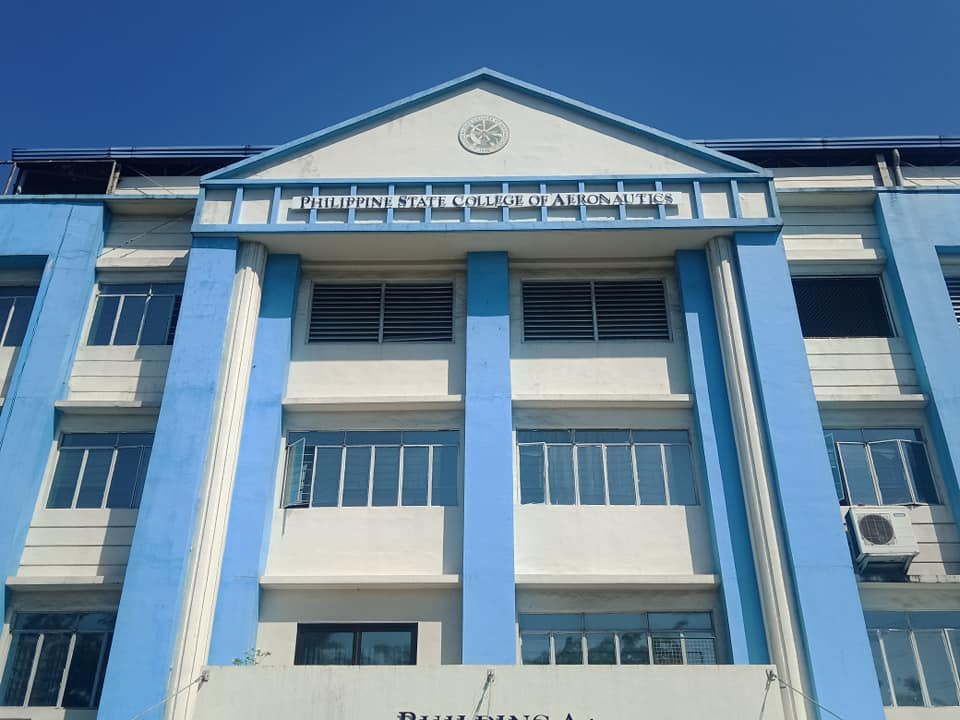
NAAP main campus in Villamor, Pasay, Metro Manila

Campus	Campus Director	Founded	Address
NAAP – Villamor Campus	Prof. Marwin M. Dela Cruz, Ph.D (President)	1977	Piccio Garden, Villamor, Pasay
NAAP – Basa Air Base Campus	Asst. Prof. Carlito P. Quiambao Jr., MEAM	1967	Basa Air Base, Floridablanca, Pampanga
NAAP – Basa-Palmayo Extension Campus	Asst. Prof. Carlito P. Quiambao Jr., MEAM	2014	Palmayo Resettlement Area, Palmayo, Floridablanca, Pampanga
NAAP – Fernando Air Base Campus	Mr. Martell Gerard Anthony C. Geli, MEAM	1977	Fernando Air Base, Lipa, Batangas
NAAP – Mactan Campus	Dr. Benison G. Momo (OIC)	1979	B/Gen Benito N. Ebuen Air Base, Lapu-Lapu, Cebu
NAAP – Mactan-Medellin Extension Campus	Dr. Benison G. Momo (OIC)	2014	Barangay Curva, Medellin, Cebu

Upcoming campuses

- NAAP – Guimaras

== Organization ==
=== Board of trustees ===
Under the Republic Act 12255 section 13, also the same pattern of Republic Act 8292, Higher Education Modernization Act of 1997, the governing body of NAAP is hereby in the Board of trustees which shall be composed of the following:

	Board Member	
Chairperson	Michelle A. Ong	Commissioner, Commission on Higher Education
Vice Chairperson	Marwin M. Dela Cruz	College President, National Aviation Academy of the Philippines
Member	Joel Villanueva	Chairperson, Senate Committee on Higher, Technical and Vocational Education
Member	Jude Acidre	Chairperson, House Committee on Higher and Technical Education
Member	Arsenio Balisacan	Secretary, Department of Economic, Planning and Development
Member	Raul del Rosario	Director General, Civil Aviation Authority of the Philippines
Member	Arthur Cordura	Commanding General of the Philippine Air Force
Member	Ramon Ragasa	Representative, Private Sector
Member	Isidro Macaranas	NAAP Alumni Sector Representative
Member	Ramsey Ferrer	President, NAAP Faculty Federation
Member	Val Kasper Lubiano	President, NAAP Federation of Supreme Student Council

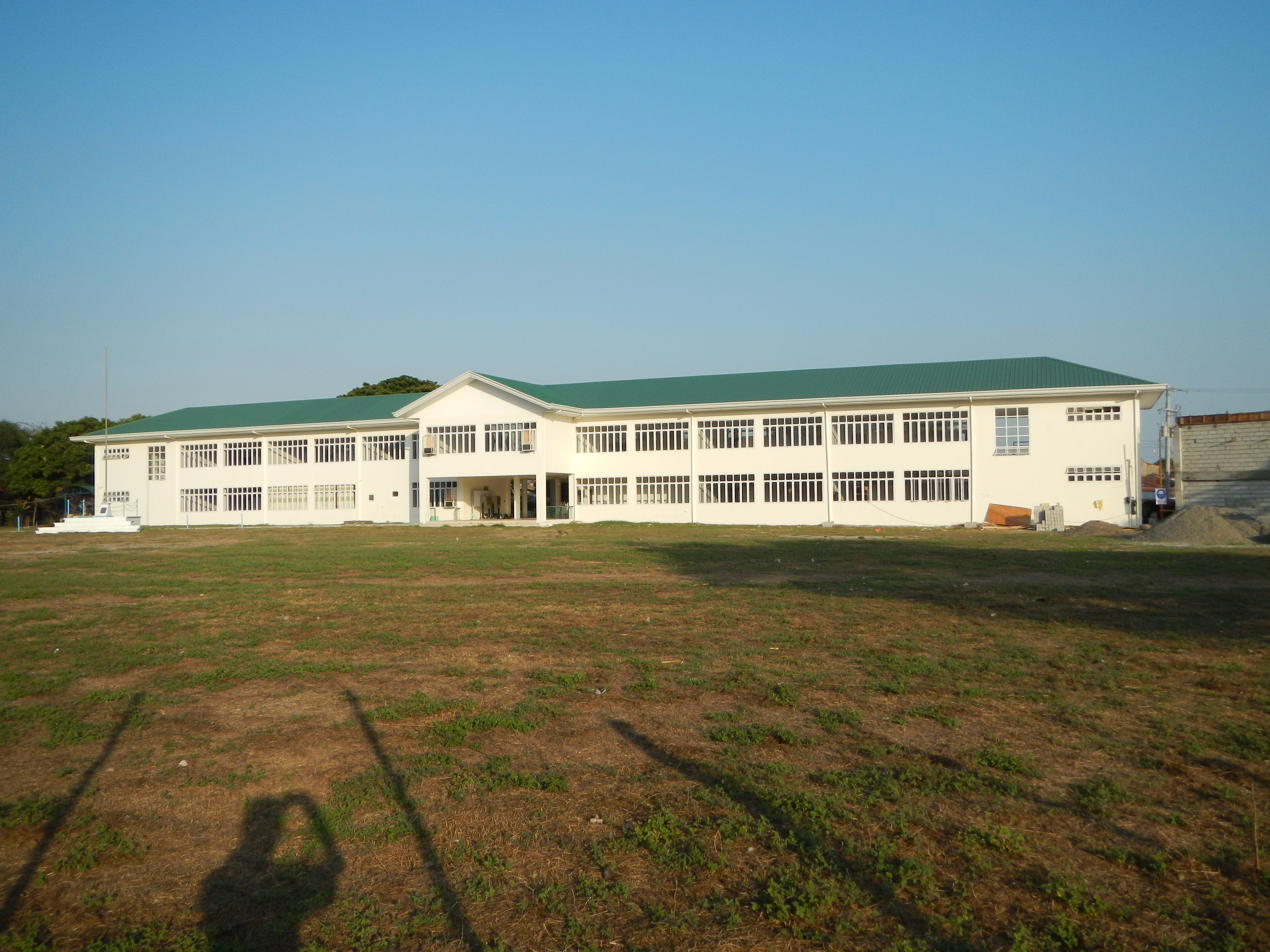
NAAP – Basa Palmayo, Floridablanca, Pampanga

== Publications ==
The official student publication of the College is known as Aeronautica in Villamor Campus, Aerodite in Basa-Palmayo Campus, Aeropioneer in Fernando Air Base Campus and Aerotalk in Mactan Air Base Campus.

== Notable alumni ==
- Lt. Gen. William K. Hotchkiss III, AFP (Ret.) – Director General, Civil Aviation Authority of the Philippines (CAAP)
