= National Tennis Centre =

National Tennis Centre or National Tennis Center may refer to:

- USTA Billie Jean King National Tennis Center, home of the US Open Grand Slam tennis tournament
- National Tennis Centre (Australia), at Melbourne Park; now Rod Laver Arena, home of the Australian Open Grand Slam tennis tournament
- National Tennis Centre (Canada), in Toronto, which was demolished in 2003
- National Tennis Centre (United Kingdom), in London
- National Tennis Centre, Bratislava, Slovakia, includes the Peugeot Arena
- China National Tennis Center, Beijing, China; home of the China Open; 2008 Summer Olympics venue

== See also ==
- NTC (disambiguation)
