= Aurora State College of Technology =

Public college in Aurora, Philippines

- Motto: To the World, In the World, For the World
- Type: State college
- Established: December 30, 1993
- President: Renato G. Reyes
- Students: 8,211
- Undergraduates: 8,031
- Postgraduates: 180
- Location: Baler, Aurora, Philippines; 16°11′20″N 122°03′08″E
- Website: ascot.edu.ph
- Location in Luzon Location in the Philippines

The Aurora State College of Technology (ASCOT; Filipino: Kolehiyong Pampamahalaan sa Teknolohiya ng Aurora) is a public state college in Aurora, Philippines. Its main campus is located in Baler, with satellite campuses in Bazal, Maria Aurora, and Esteves, Casiguran, Aurora.

The college is mandated to provide technical and professional instruction in the sciences, arts, teacher education, agriculture, engineering, technology, and short-term vocational courses, as well as to promote research, advanced studies, and academic leadership in its areas of specialization.

On September 15, 2025, President Bongbong Marcos signed Republic Act No. 12298, converting the college into the Aurora State University of Science and Technology.

== Academic programs ==
=== Undergraduate ===
Bachelor of Science in Civil Engineering Major in:

- Construction Engineering and Management

Bachelor of Science in Electrical Engineering

Bachelor of Science in Mechanical Engineering

Bachelor of Science in Agriculture Major in:

- Animal Science
- Crop Science

Certificate in Agricultural Science

Bachelor of Science in Fisheries

Bachelor of Science in Forestry Diploma in Forest Technology

Bachelor of Secondary Education Major in:

- English
- Filipino
- Science
- Mathematics

Bachelor of Elementary Education

Bachelor of Technology and Livelihood Education Major in:

- Home Economics
- Information and Communication Technology

Bachelor of Science in Information Technology With specialization in:

- Application Programming
- Digital Design

Associate in Computer Technology

Bachelor in Industrial Technology Major in: Automotive Engineering Technology

- Diploma in Automotive Engineering Technician Course
- Associate in Automotive Engineering Technician Course
- Certificate in Automotive Engineering Technician Course

Electrical Engineering Technology

- Diploma in Electrical Engineering Technician Course
- Associate in Electrical Engineering Technician Course
- Certificate in Electrical Engineering Technician Course

Civil Engineering Technology

- Diploma in Civil Engineering Technician Course
- Associate in Senior Civil Engineering Technician Course
- Certificate in Junior Civil Engineering Technician Course

Food Technology

- Diploma in Food Technology
- Certificate in Food Technology

Bachelor of Science in Hospitality Management

== Gallery ==
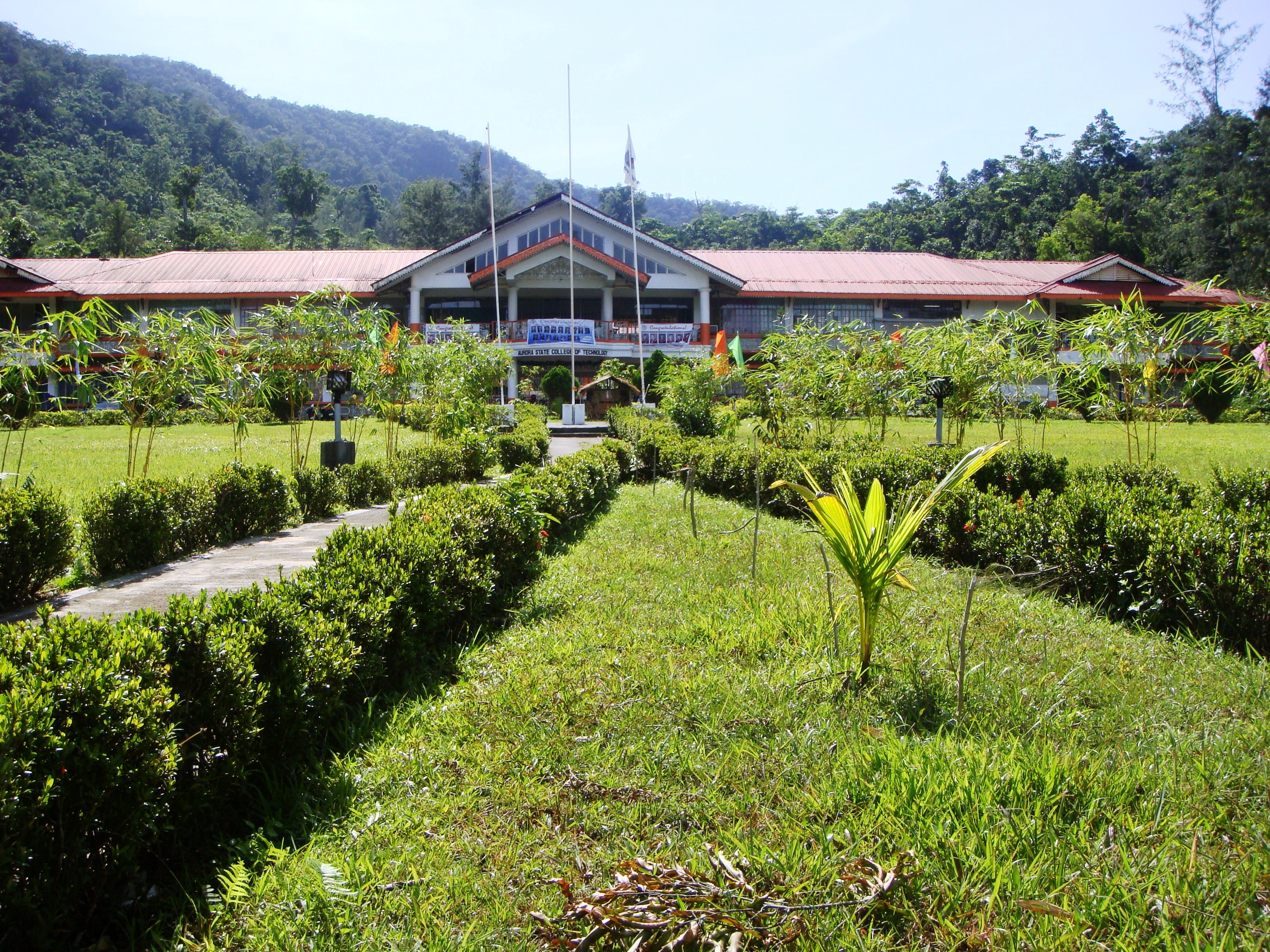
The Aurora State College of Technology (ASCOT) in Sitio Dicaloyungan, Barangay Zabali, Baler, Aurora

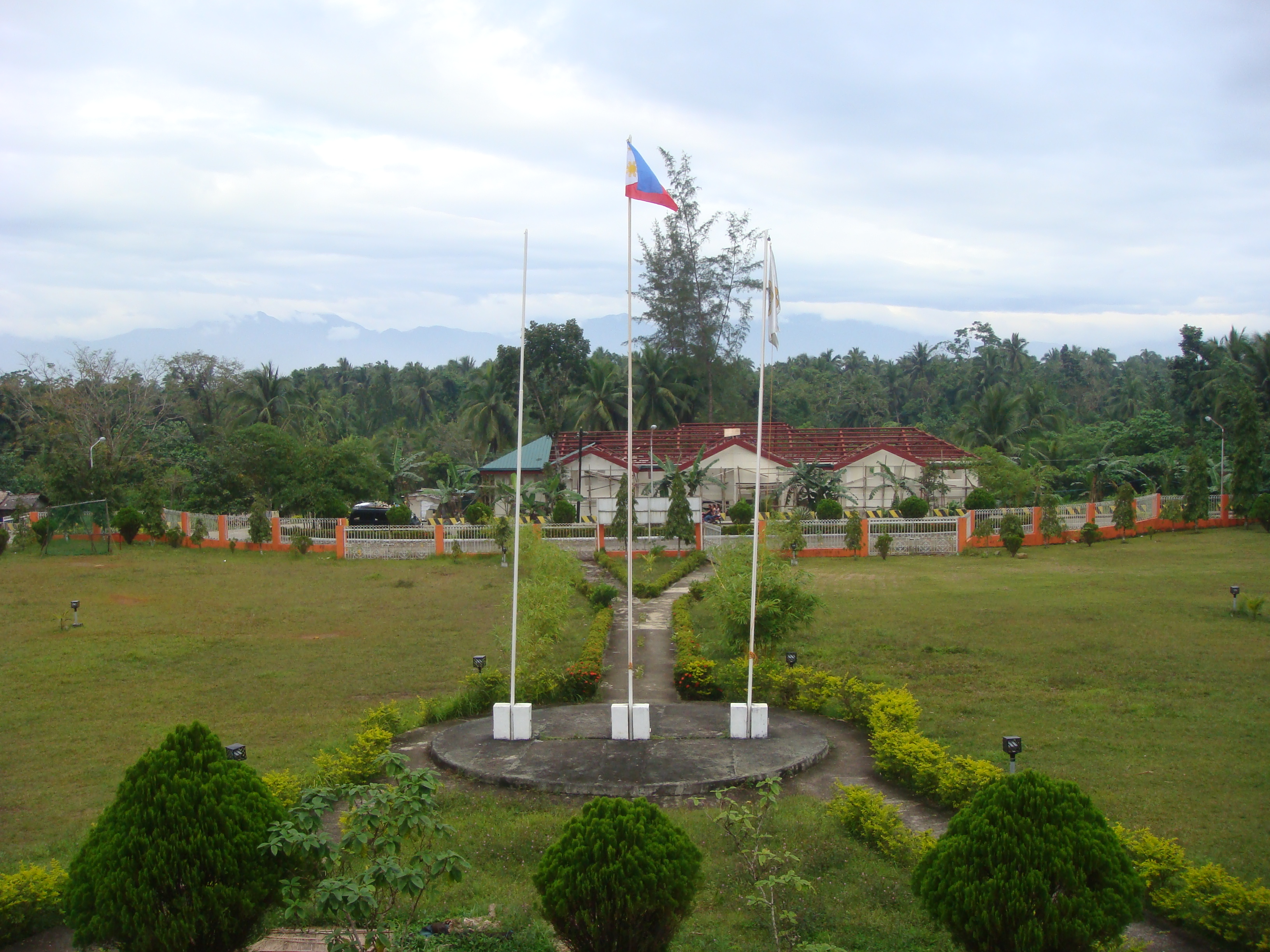
Overview from the main campus

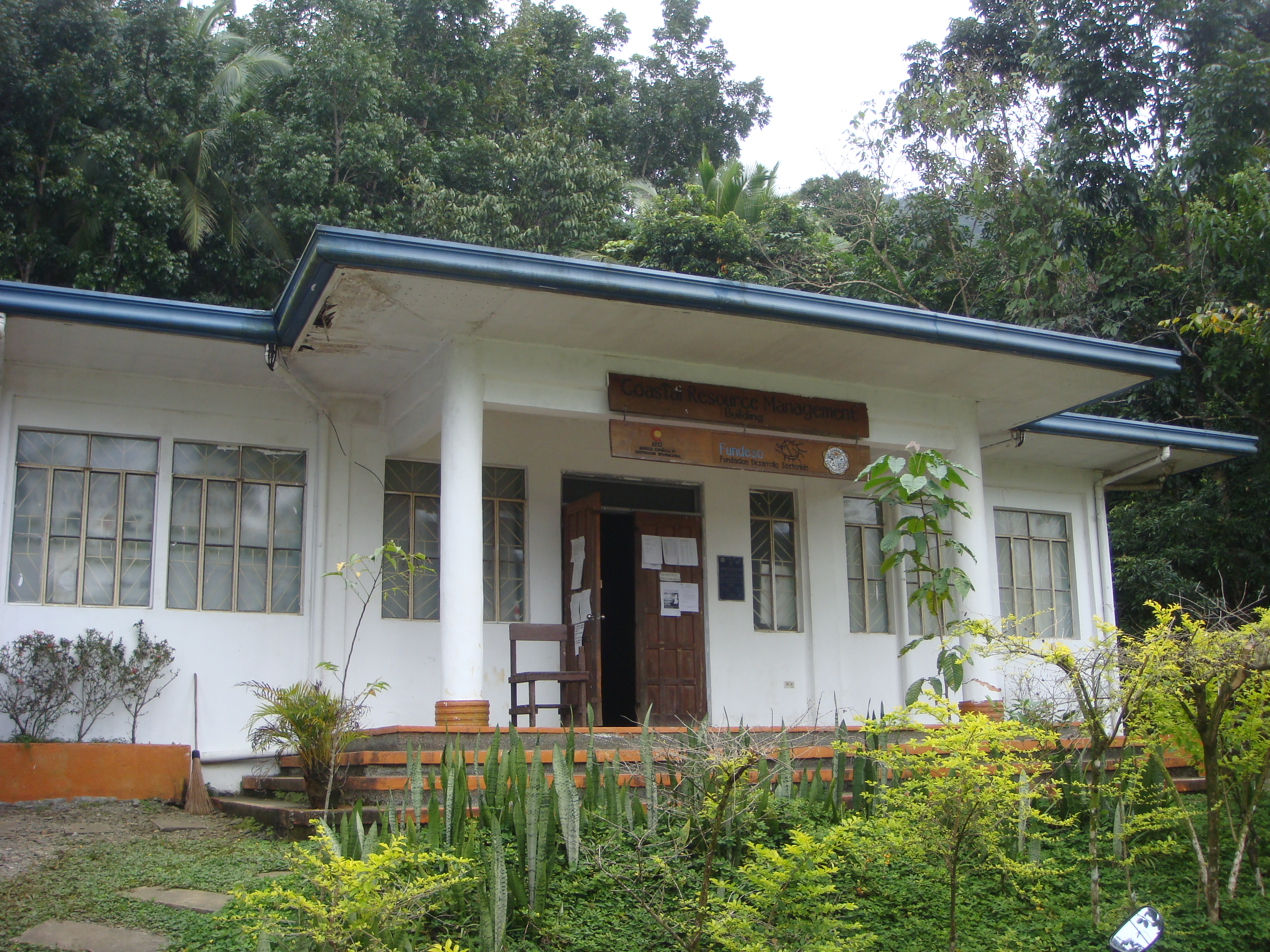
Coastal Resource Management Building of ASCOT

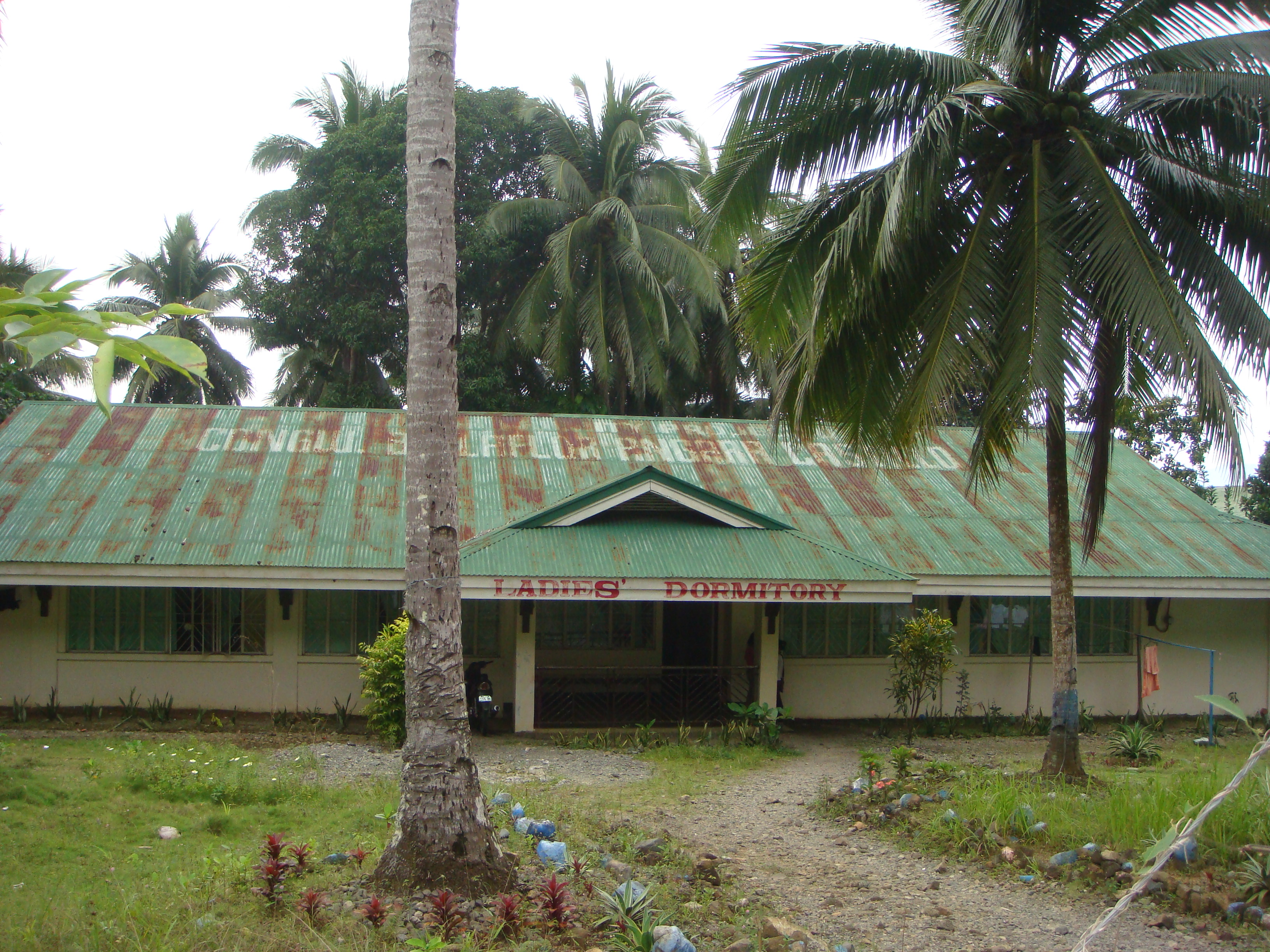
Ladies dormitory

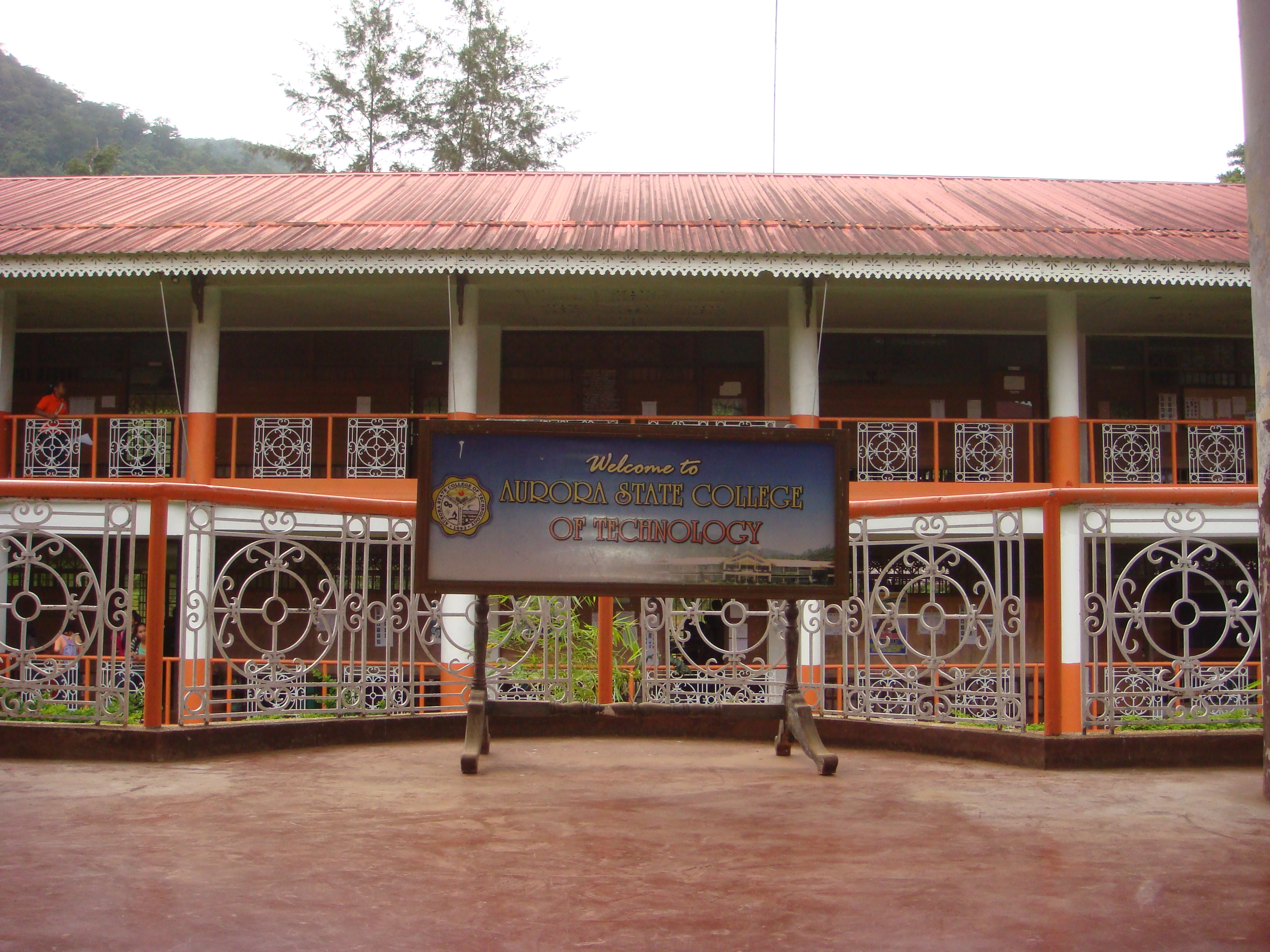
Welcome marker of ASCOT

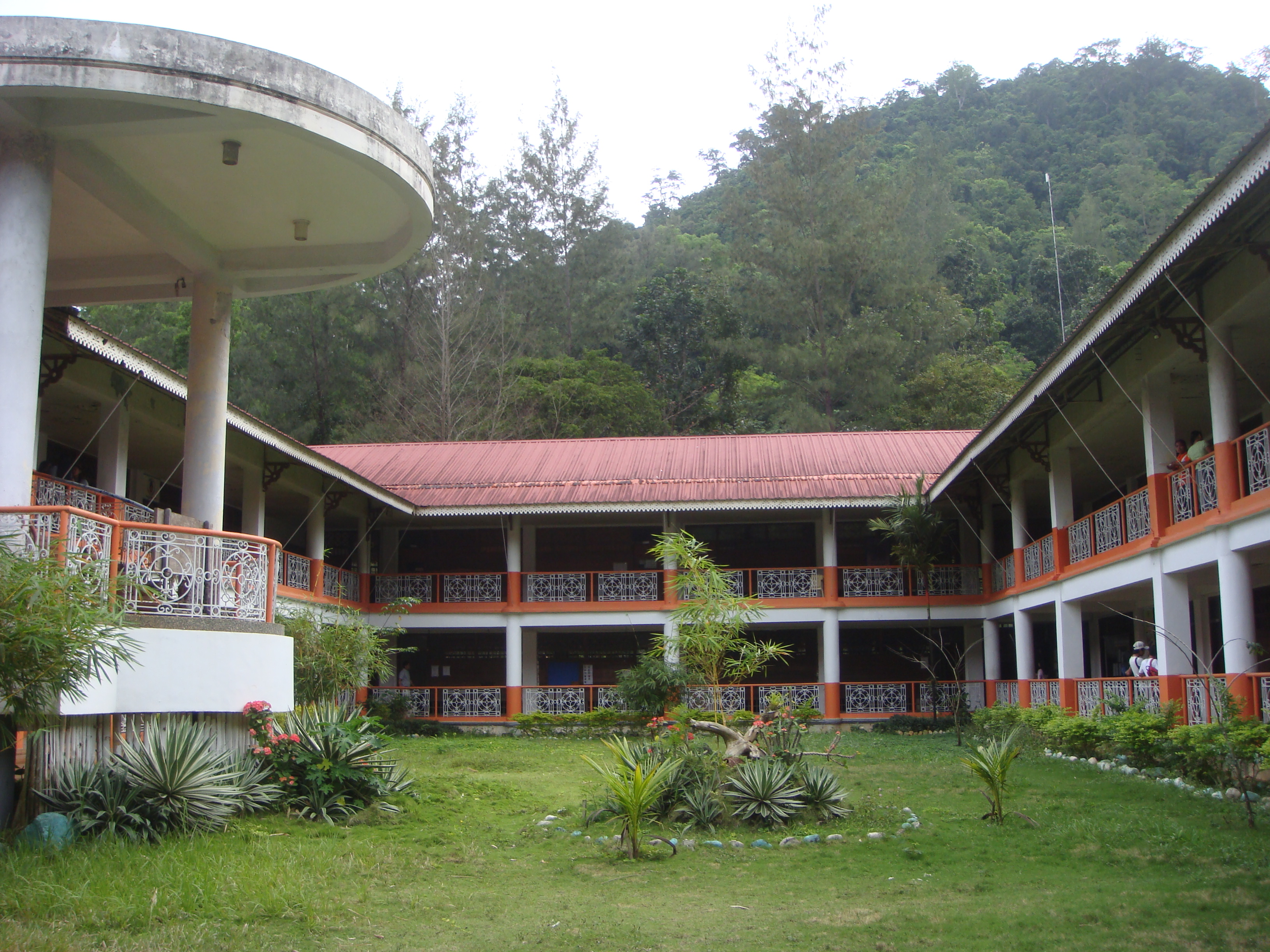
The inner campus
