= Palompon Institute of Technology =

Public college in Leyte, Philippines

- Instituto sa Teknolohiya ng Palompon (Filipino)
- Former names: Palompon School of Arts and Trade (1961-1972)
- Type: State College
- Established: 1961
- President: Dr. Dennis A. Del Pilar
- Vice-president: Dr. Claudine L. Igot (VP for Academic Affairs); Dr. Rolando C. Entoma (VP for Administration); Dr. Antonia C. Mendoza (VP for Research, Extension & External Affairs)
- Location: Palompon, Leyte, Philippines; 11°03′09″N 124°23′15″E
- Colors: Red and white
- Nickname: PITinians
- Mascot: PIT Mariners
- Website: pit.edu.ph
- Location in the Visayas Location in the Philippines

The Palompon Institute of Technology (PIT) is a state college in Leyte, Philippines. It is mandated to provide higher vocational, professional, and technical instruction and training in trade and industrial education and other vocational courses, professional courses, and offer engineering courses. It is also mandated to promote research, advance studies and progressive leadership in the fields of trade, technical, industrial and technological education. Its main campus is in Palompon, Leyte.

The Palompon Institute of Technology is composed of many colleges including the College of Education, College of Technology and Engineering, College of Arts and Science, College of Maritime Education and College of Advance Education. It is located along Evangelista Street in Palompon, Leyte Province, Philippines. It is a Leyte educational institution that specializes in the field of maritime sciences, and offers academic programs such as Bachelor of Science in marine transportation, Bachelor of Science in marine engineering, Bachelor of Science in electrical engineering, Bachelor of Science in mechanical engineering, Bachelor of Science in industrial engineering, Bachelor of Science in industrial technology, Bachelor of Science in information technology, Bachelor of Arts in communication, Bachelor of Science in shipping management, Bachelor of Science in hotel and restaurant management, Major in cruise ship, Bachelor of Elementary Education, Bachelor of Secondary Education, and Bachelor of Science in home technology education. Aside from these baccalaureate degrees, the college offers graduate academic programs that include Doctor of Philosophy Major in educational management, Master of Arts Major in community development, and Master of Technology Education. Furthermore, this educational institution also offers scholarships and grants to numerous intelligent students.

PIT has been converted to Palompon Polytechnic State University (PPSU) through Republic Act No. 10599 sponsored by Rep. Lucy Torres-Gomez and signed by former president Noynoy Aquino on June 4, 2013. RA 10599 integrates PIT with Marcelino R. Veloso National Polytechnic College in Tabango to form PPSU. However, there are pending requirements set by CHED that needs to be complied before PIT can be completely converted into PPSU.
