= National Takaful Company =

National Takaful Company may refer to:

- Abu Dhabi National Takaful Company
- National Takaful Company (Watania)
