= Occidental Mindoro State University =

Public university in Occidental Mindoro, Philippines

- Pamantasang Pang-estrado ng Occidental Mindoro (Filipino)
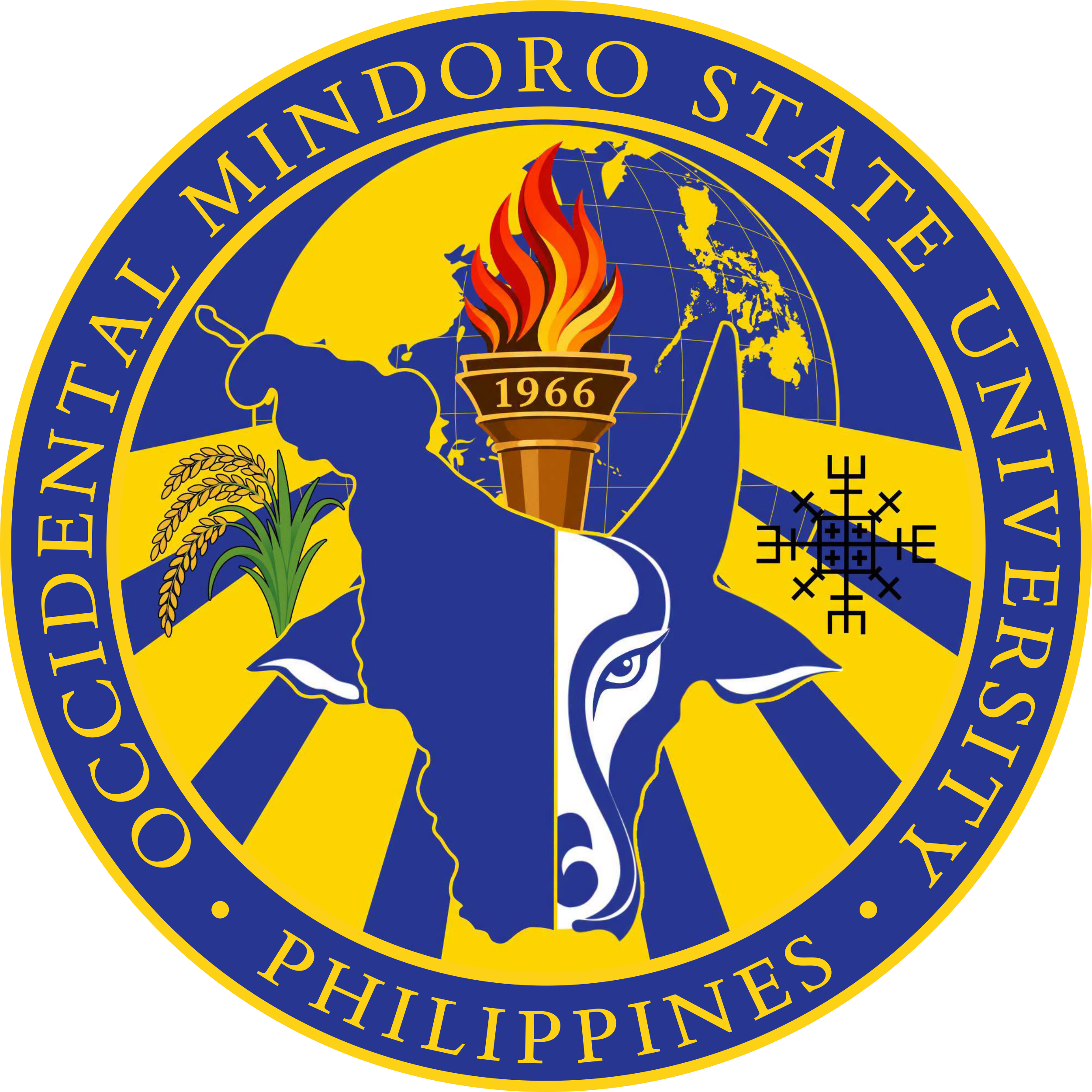
- Former names: San Jose Municipal High School (1967–); San Jose National High School (1966–1983); Occidental Mindoro National College (1983–2009); Occidental Mindoro State College (2009-2026)
- Motto: Educate. Empower. Excel.
- Type: State university
- Established: 1966; 60 years ago
- Affiliations: Philippine Association of State Universities and Colleges
- President: Dr. Elbert C. Edaniol
- Vice-president: Dr. Norma B. Muyot (VP for Academic Affairs); Ma. Paz Fatima D. Palmares (VP for Administration, Finance & Support Services)
- Principal: Miguel Elausa
- Students: 10,579 (2016)
- Undergraduates: 2,037 (2015)
- Location: San Jose, Occidental Mindoro, Philippines; 12°21′16″N 121°04′00″E
- Campus: Urban Main: San Jose, Occidental Mindoro Satellite: List; Labangan, Occidental Mindoro; Murtha, Occidental Mindoro; Sablayan, Occidental Mindoro; Mamburao, Occidental Mindoro; Lubang, Occidental Mindoro
- Colors: Yellow Blue; White
- Website: omsc.edu.ph
- Location in the Luzon Location in the Philippines

Occidental Mindoro State University (OMSU) is the only state university in the province of Occidental Mindoro, Philippines. Its main campus is located in the municipality of San Jose. OMSU began as a barangay high school founded in 1966 and is now a full-fledged state university with six campuses catering to more than eight thousand students of the province and nearby municipalities.

On June 17, 2026. Occidental Mindoro State College was granted a university status by the Commission on Higher Education (CHEd) via Republic Act No. 11587, and will now be known as Occidental Mindoro State University.

== History ==
Occidental Mindoro State University was established as Barrio High School in 1966. The idea that the school should be shaped after Pedro Orata’s Barangay High School was conceived by then Mayor Juan G. Santos Sr., who was also the PTA president of San Jose Pilot Elementary School. The concept was carried out by Sofronio Fadre, Schools Division superintendent, and Mariano Ramirez, East District supervisor. Mayor Tirso Abedela approved Resolution No. 23 in 1967, establishing the self-supporting public secondary school as San Jose Municipal High School.

=== Elevation to State College ===
San Jose Municipal High School was elevated to San Jose National High School (SJNHS) by Republic Act No. 6568, sponsored by Congressman Nene Sato. Bernabe Macaraig was appointed as the school's first principal. Upon the school's elevation, attendance exceeded 3,000 students.

SJNHS has elevated again to Occidental Mindoro State College on 24 June 1983. This was due by virtue of Batas Pambansa Blg. 531 as amended by Republic Act No. 9747, which was sponsored by Congressman Pedro T. Mendiola Sr. The first superintendent of the school was Macaraig.

=== Mamburao campus and service areas ===
Education, Culture and Sports Minister, Lourdes R. Quisumbing appointed Virginia A. Sicat, who was then assistant principal of the OMSC, as officer-in-charge of the institution on 1 April 1986. Ofelia A. Rebong was also appointed as the first president of the college in the same year. Rebong's term was seven years long and staff development was infocus during this period.

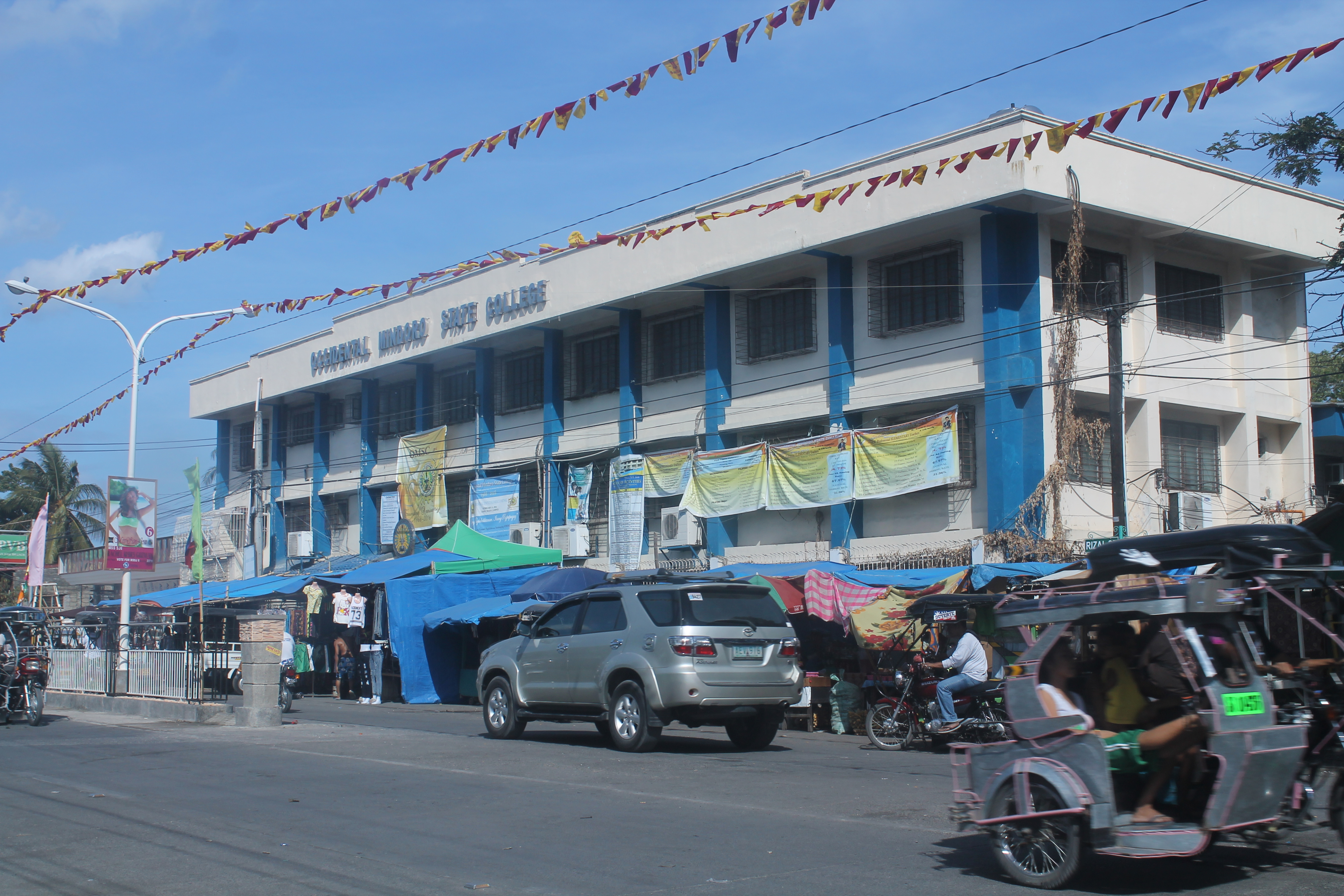
University campus building in San Jose.

OMSC expanded in the 1991–1992 school year, with the absorption of Occidental Mindoro Community College in Mamburao by the state college. The community college became a satellite campus of the OMSC and became known as the OMSC-Mamburao Campus, which offers baccalaureate and non-degree courses. A 98.8725 hectares (244.319 acres) plot owned by the Organization for the International Scientific and Cultural Advancement (OISCA) was also acquired by the state college through the Provincial Board and Provincial Development Council.

Sofronio S. Sanqui was appointed college president on 19 December 1994 and sworn into office on 29 December, the same year, by DECS Secretary Ricardo T. Gloria, after the retirement of Rebong. Sanqui was the vice president for Academic Affairs and dean of the Graduate School before his appointment. Sanqui focused on human resource development and student development.

The state college established the following service areas in San Jose, Occidental Mindoro:

- Damayan Center - San Isidro, on a 2 hectares (4.9 acres) plot.
- Experimental Forestry - adjacent the Damayan Center on a 28.4974 hectares (70.419 acres) land.
- Caminawit Extension Program - Caminawit
- Agro-Forestry Center - Labangan on an 8.7 hectares (21 acres) land.

=== Expansion within San Jose ===
In the year 2000, by virtue of Republic Act 8760 (also known as the General Appropriations Act) significant reforms were brought about in the educational system, specifically to OMSC. It became the host to CHED-supervised institutions in the province, namely the Occidental Mindoro Polytechnic College (OMPC) in Murtha, San Jose, Occidental Mindoro and the Pedro T. Mendiola Sr. Memorial Technological and Polytechnic College in Brgy. Bagong Sikat, San Jose, Occidental Mindoro. With the integration, OMPC became known as the OMSC-OMPC Campus, while the PTMSMTPC was renamed to OMSC-PTMSMTPC and is now situated at the Labangan Campus.

After 15 years of sterling and dedicated service to the Institution, Sofronio S. Sanqui, the second college president, retired. He was replaced by Arnold N. Venturina, when the Board of Trustees of the College elected him on 11 September 2009. With the change of administration, several significant changes in the programs and policies of the college were also enforced.

Three months to Venturina's presidency, President Gloria Macapagal-Arroyo signed RA 9747, also known as an “Act Renaming Occidental Mindoro National College as the Occidental Mindoro State College”, on 10 November 2009, whose principal sponsor was Congresswoman and Deputy Speaker, Amelita C. Villarosa.

On 1 May 2010, the college was conferred the “San Jose Builders Award (Education Sector)" by the San Jose Centennial Commission. This was in recognition of its significant contributions to the progress and development of the town of San Jose.

=== The College of Arts, Sciences, and Technology ===
The College of Arts, Sciences, and Technology, a learning and research institute at Occidental Mindoro State College, is led by College Dean Joselito D. Aguid, a Rector of Dynamic Theological Seminary.
