= Davao del Norte State College =

Public college in Davao del Norte, Philippines

- Dalubhasaang Pampamahalaan ng Davao del Norte (Filipino)
- Other name: DNSC
- Type: State college
- Established: February 14, 1995 (as DNSC); April 29, 1969 (as DANSOF)
- Affiliations: Philippine Association of State Universities and Colleges (PASUC), Mindanao Association of State Colleges and Universities Foundation, Inc. (MASCUF)
- President: Dr. Joy M. Sorrosa
- Faculty: 246
- Administrative staff: 148
- Students: 7,584 (2nd Sem, 2025-2026)
- Undergraduates: 7,243
- Postgraduates: 341
- Location: Panabo, Davao del Norte, Mindanao, Philippines; 7°18′48.7″N 125°40′13.2″E
- Campus: Panabo (Main Campus); Carmen Campus; IGaCOS Campus; Datu Jose Libayao Campus
- Colors: Forest Green
- Nickname: "DNSC Sharks"
- Website: www.dnsc.edu.ph
- Location in Mindanao Location in the Philippines

Davao del Norte State College is a public college in New Visayas, Panabo, Philippines, that provides instruction and progressive leadership in education, engineering, arts, sciences, fisheries, and other fields.

== History ==
Congressman Lorenzo Sarmiento and Senator Alejandro Almendras initiated legislation that led to the creation of the Davao del Norte School of Fisheries (DANSOF) on April 29, 1969, by virtue of Republic Act 5876.

Plans were on hiatus for six years due to lack of budgetary allocation; Tranquilino Benigno worked for the inclusion of DANSOF in the annual budget. On January 5, 1976, DANSOF started its operation within the compound of Panabo Provincial High School (PPHS). In 1979, the Davao Regional Institute of Fisheries Technology (DRIFT) was established at DaNSoF, having been chosen among the seven fishery schools under the 6th IBRD Fishery Education Development Program.

Upon the retirement of Benigno as DRIFT director and DANSOF administrator, Dr. Vicente Hermoso was appointed on December 15, 1992 as vocational school superintendent. The school was converted to the Davao del Norte State College (DNSC) on February 14, 1995, through Republic Act 787 authored by Congressman Rodolfo del Rosario. Hermoso became the first president of DNSC.

== 21st century developments ==
On October 30, 2001, Dr. Edgardo M. Santos became the second president of DNSC. Under his presidency, Santos worked on the foundations established by earlier administrators and initiated a research consortium which led to DNSC becoming the locus for the Department of Science and Technology — Philippine Council for Marine and Aquatic Research and Development (DOST-PCAMRD) Zonal Center V. Academic programs and administrative policies were revisited and upgraded which led to the growth of the institution.

By 2007, DNSC had four of its baccalaureate programs accredited: Bachelor of Science in Fisheries, Science in Marine Biology, Science in Information Technology, and Secondary Education. In 2009, three more programs were accredited: Ph.D. in Educational Management, Master of Arts in Educational Management and Bachelor of Science in Food Technology.

In addition, the college serves as the Regional Training Center for Vermiculture and Vermicompost Production as a result of its collaboration with DOST-PCAMRRD. It is the coordinating and host institution for the Agriculture, Forestry and Natural Resources Project of the DOST for the fisheries sector. Government agencies, private entrepreneurs and plantation owners linked to the college for technical collaboration.

The college has been chosen as a partner agency in Region XI of the Commission on Information and Communications Technology (CICT) for the development of ICT expertise in the country's human capital and enhances the competitiveness of Filipino workers in the global ICT market. Under this program, DNSC serves at least 23 schools in Davao del Norte, Davao de Oro, and Davao Oriental.

In recognition of the college's developed manpower, the Technical Education and Skills Development Authority (TESDA) established the college as an Assessment Center with its qualified faculty in the areas of Hardware Servicing NC II and PC Operations NC II. TESDA also chose the college as an assessment center for Aquaculture and Food Processing.

In early 2010, the college was accorded by the Commission on Higher Education the National University or College in Agriculture and Fisheries (NUCAF) for Region XI.

Among its recent accomplishments is the award as CHED Best Regional HEI Research Program for 2008 for its Biodiversity and Environment program. A component of this program is a CHED-funded project on the Conservation of the Endangered Giant Clams Tridacna Squamosa and Tridacna Gigas: A Strategy for Environmental Protection under the CHED Commissioner Nenalyn Defensor's Save Our Shore (SOS) Program.

In March 2011, the college was also awarded the CHED Best Regional Extension Program for its project, Development Interventions in the Island Garden of Samal." This project revolves around community livelihood, cooperatives and harnessing community involvement in marine and environmental protection.

The college is headed by Dr. Jonathan A. Bayogan who was appointed as the third college president on December 14, 2010.

On March 15, 2019, Dr. Joy M. Sorrosa was appointed as the fourth president of the college and the first woman to take the helm. On her first year, the College was awarded by the Bureau of Fisheries and Aquatic Resources, the “Gawad Pagkilala” recognition as a stakeholder/partner institution which afforded exemplary support and contributions in fisheries conservation and management. She also strengthened the linkages of the college both locally and internationally. She visited local government executives to discuss continuing and future partnerships, and was able to secure a renewed Memorandum of Understanding between DNSC and the University of Science and Technology of Hanoi, Vietnam.

The college was also declared as the 9th Best Performing School in Teacher Education because of its performance in the September 2019 Licensure Examination. DNSC was able to produce four top-notchers for 2019. With the leadership of Dr. Sorrosa and support of the DNSC community, the college was able to come up with its five-year Strategic Plan (2020 – 2024). The plan included strategies that will help the college fulfil its vision of becoming a Premiere Higher Institution in Agri-Fisheries and Socio-Cultural Development in the ASEAN Region.

DNSC will continue to expand as it prepares to offer more programs that are responsive to the needs of the country, both in the undergraduate and graduate levels. It will retain and strengthen its roots as a fishery institution, which purpose and relevance stand the test of time.

Dr. Sorrosa believes that the key in effectively implementing organizational reforms is the human resource. She has been initiating activities that focus on the attainment of inclusive holistic growth of the college’s faculty members, administrative staff, and students. With the efforts and contributions of its people, DNSC will remain as an institution that leads, nurtures, and gives back.

== Academic Institutions and Programs ==
Institute of Teacher Education (ITEd) :

Graduate Programs:

- Doctor of Philosophy in Educational Management*
- Master of Arts in Educational Management
- Master in Science Teaching Math, Biology, Physical Sciences
- Master of Arts in Basic Education English
- Master of Arts in Basic Education Mathematics
- Master of Arts in Basic Education Biological Science
- Certificate in Pre-School Education (in consortium with DOSCST)
- Certificate in Physical Education

Undergraduate Programs:

- Bachelor of Arts in Communication*
- Bachelor in Secondary Education (BSEd)*, Majors in:
  - Science
  - English
  - Mathematics
- Bachelor of Technology and Livelihood Education*

Institute of Aquatic and Applied Sciences (IAAS) :

Graduate Programs:

- Master in Fisheries Management Majors in Fish Processing, Aquaculture
- Master of Science in Marine Biodiversity

Undergraduate Programs:

- Bachelor of Fisheries and Aquatic Science*
- Bachelor of Science in Marine Biology* (BSMB)
- Bachelor of Science in Food Technology* (BSFT)
- Bachelor of Science in Agro-Forestry* (BSAF)

Institute of Computing (IC) :

Undergraduate Programs:

- Bachelor of Science in Information Technology* (Ladderized)
- Bachelor of Science in Information Systems* (BSIS)

Institute of Leadership, Entrepreneurship and Good Governance (ILEGG)

Graduate Programs:

- Master in Public Administration (in consortium with Mindanao University of Science and Technology)

Undergraduate Programs:

- Bachelor in Public Administration* (BPA)
- Bachelor of Science in Social Work (BSSW)
- Bachelor of Science in Entrepreneurship (BSE)
- Bachelor of Science in Tourism Management (BSTM)
- Bachelor of Science in Disaster Resiliency and Management (BSDRM)

Datu Jose A. Libayao : DNSC Extension Campus (Municipality of Talaingod) :

Undergraduate Programs:

- Bachelor of Agricultural Technology (in a consortium with SPAMAST)
- Bachelor of Science in Agroforestry

DNSC Carmen Campus (Municipality of Carmen, Davao del Norte) :

Undergraduate Programs:

- Bachelor of Physical Education (BPEd)

Programs with an asterisk (*) are AACCUP accredited.

== See also ==
- Commission on Higher Education
- Davao del Norte State College Laboratory School
