= Biliran Province State University =

Public university in Biliran, Philippines

- Pamantasang Pampamahalaan ng Lalawigan ng Biliran (Filipino)
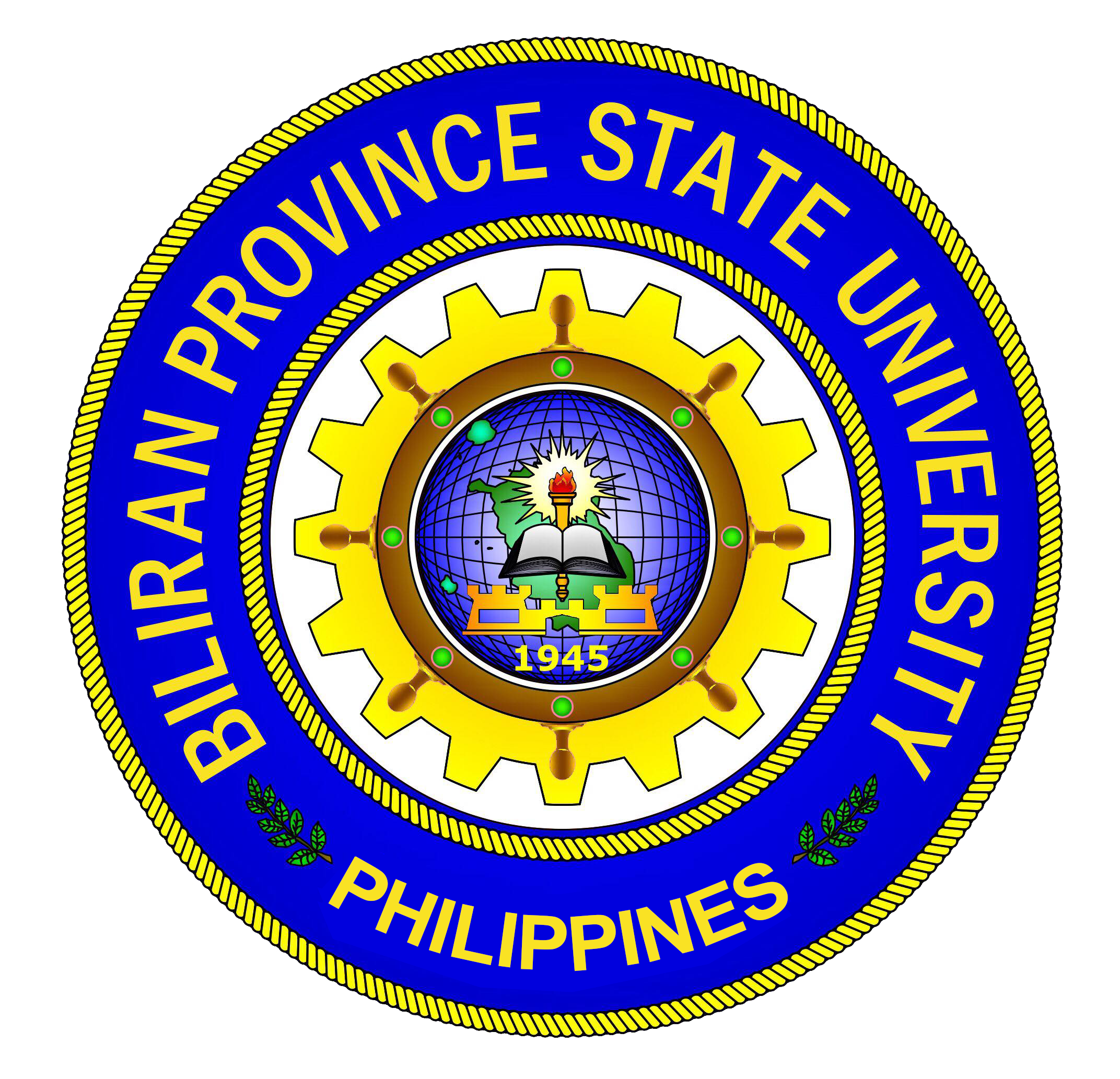
- Other name: BiPSU
- Former names: Naval High School (1946‑1965); Naval Institute of Technology (1965‑2009); Naval State University (2009‑2019)
- Motto: "Nobility, Solidarity & Unity"
- Type: Public Non-sectarian Coeducational secondary and higher education institution
- Established: October 30, 1945; 80 years ago
- President: Dr. Victor C. Cañezo, Jr.
- Vice-president: List: Dr. Susan S. Bentor (VP for Academic Affairs); Dr. Rossini B. Romero (VP for Finance and Administration); Dr. Marianne Agnes T. Mendoza (VP for Research and Innovation); Dr. Erwin G. Salvatierra (VP for Student and External Affairs)
- Dean: List: Dr. Matias A. Bentor (Graduate School); Engr.Vivencio A.Pelesco (School of Engineering); Dr. Ryan Teofel P. Arpon (School of Teacher Education); Dr. Analiza B. Calles (School of Arts and Sciences); Dr. Minerva E. Sanosa (School of Management and Entrepreneurship); Dr. Jovy Dia R. Saniel (School of Nursing and Health Sciences); Dr. Chona B. Sabinay (School of Technology, and Computer Studies); Archie T. Ramirez (School of Criminal Justice Education)
- Director: List: Dr. Christopher R. Vicera (Extension Services); Dr. Homer R. Ampong (Management Information System); Dr. Marianne Agnes T. Mendoza (Gender & Development); Joedel O. Peñaranda (Institutional Planning); Dr. Noel Felimon T. Gayrama (National Service Training Program); Dr. Norma M. Duallo (Student Development & Services Office); Carlito C. Cabas, Jr. (Quality Assurance & Accreditation); Dr. Francisco M. Ebio, Jr. (University Auxiliary & Industry Development); Dr. Maribel N. Zipagan (Internalization Affairs); Mr. Estelito R. Salut, Jr. (University Media & Information Office); Dr.Conception Gayrama (Library Services); Dr. Ernil D. Sumayao (Production Services); Dr. Jason V. Ang (Curriculum, Instruction & Faculty Development); Roderick Delda (Engineering & Physical Development); Toribio Juan F. Trani (Sports & Athletic Services); Dr.JohnAnthonyRomagos (Records & Archives)
- Students: 6,000
- Location: Naval, Biliran, Philippines; 11°33′45″N 124°24′01″E
- Campus: Main campus: Naval; Satellite campus: Biliran
- Colors: Blue and Gold
- Sporting affiliations: SCUAA; PASUC
- Mascot: Tiger
- Website: www.bipsu.edu.ph
- Location in the Visayas Location in the Philippines

Biliran Province State University (BiPSU) is a state university in the municipality of Naval in Biliran, Philippines. It is operating an extension campus in the town of Biliran.

== History ==
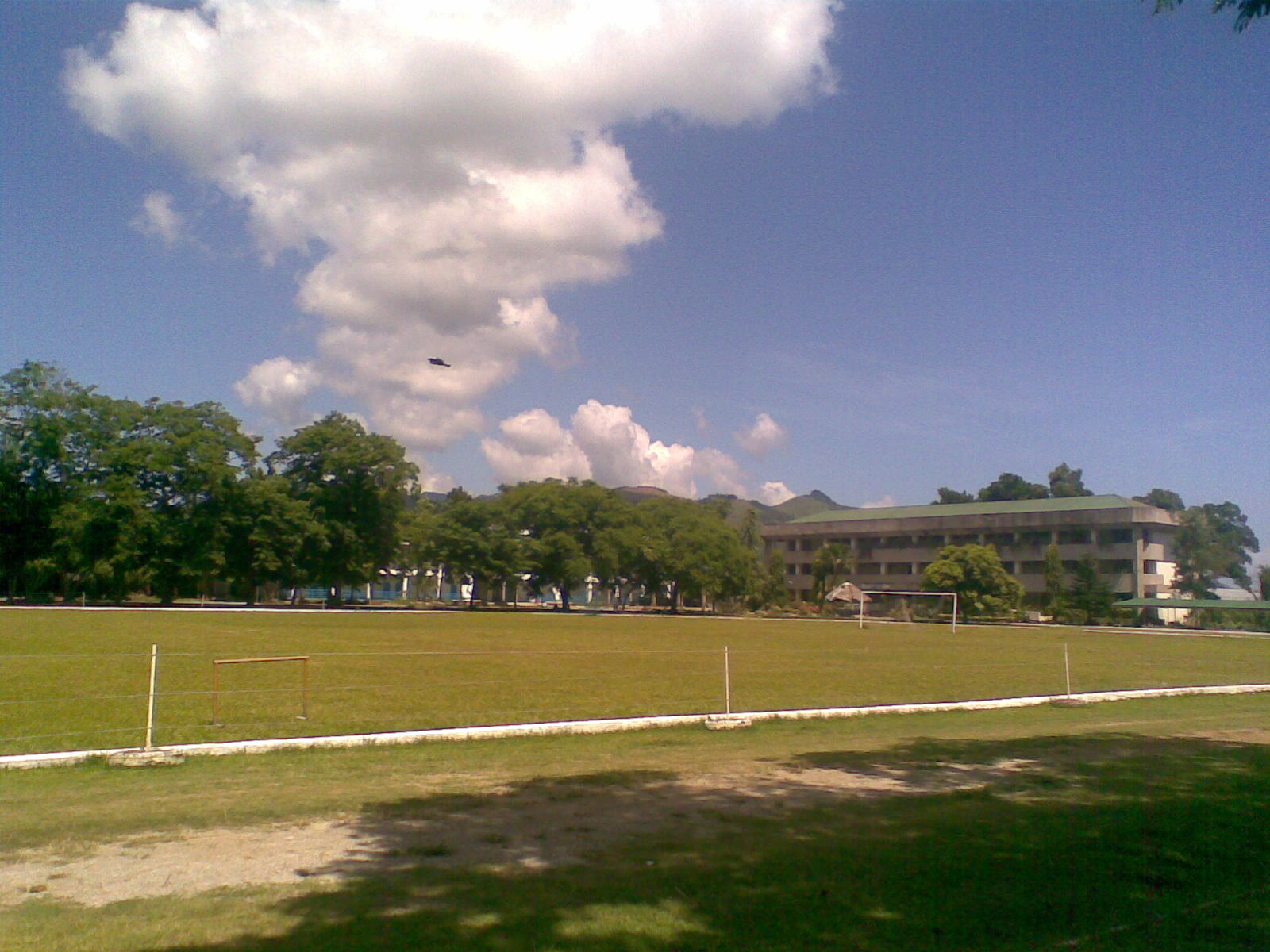
BiPSU grounds

=== Beginnings ===
On October 30, 1945, a Municipal Resolution No. 35 was passed through the late Acting Mayor Pablo Caneja, requesting to establish a secondary public high school in Naval, a municipality in Biliran province of the Philippines. The Naval High School was established and operated for school year 1946 to 1947.

After decades of the school's operation, a bill was introduced by late Congressman Marcelino Veloso which became a law on June 19, 1965, converting Naval High School into a chartered state college under Republic Act 4309. The conversion placed the school for national funding under the first president, Mr. Alfredo C. Josep. The school then offered vocational and engineering courses as required.

=== Universityhood ===
Former Congressman of the lone district of Biliran, Gerry Boy Espina, authored the House Bill 4918, proposing the Naval Institute of Technology (NIT) be converted into a State University under the name Biliran State University (Bilsu). The conversion will merge NIT and Biliran National Agricultural College (BNAC), a sister school in the municipality of Biliran. The bill, however, was not approved by the Senate. NIT filed another bill with help from the former Congressman of the province, Atty. Glenn Chong; the bill is now to convert the institute into Naval State University. On October 14, 2009, Republic Act 9718 was passed into law converting Naval Institute of Technology into Naval State University.

On January 3, 2019, Republic Act 9718 was signed by President Rodrigo Duterte, renaming the Naval State University into the Biliran Province State University and integrating therewith the Biliran National Agricultural College in the municipality of Biliran.

== Academics ==
=== Colleges, schools and campus ===
College/school/campus	Abbreviation
School of Graduate Studies	SGS
School of Engineering	SOE
School of Teacher Education	STEd
School of Arts and Sciences	SAS
School of Management and Entrepreneurship	SME
School of Nursing and Health Sciences	SNHS
School of Technology, and Computer Studies	STCS
School of Criminal Justice Education	SCJE
School of Agri-Industries and Natural Resources Management	SAiNARM

=== Curriculum ===
The Naval Institute of Technology offers undergraduate, graduate and short-term courses. Undergraduate courses include education, engineering, and maritime. College of Maritime is NIT's flagship course; since its International Standard Operation (ISO) Certification by Det Norske Veritas, international consulting firm, in 2000, the college has been consistently rated Noteworthy and Satisfactory. New courses added to the college's list are biology, business administration, criminology, economics and practical nursing. Most of these courses are ladderized, pursuant to Executive Order 358.

=== High school ===
The High School Department (Grade 7-10 & SHS Grade 11-12) of the university is part of the School of Teacher Education (STED).

The Laboratory High School (LHS) features honors and semi-honors sections. The honor section is section A. The semi-honors classes are sections B, and C, which emphasize Mathematics, Filipino, Science and English. Students who are in those classes will be classmates for the rest of their high school life provided that they do not fail a year. In June 2015, the class sectioning was made heterogeneous where students are not sorted based on their intelligence, but randomly. The ninth graders are to choose one of the major classes; Handicrafts, Automotive, Ceramics, Foods and Garments. They are supposed to stick with their chosen major class until tenth grade.

The LHS also has its governing body, the Student Body Organization (SBO) and its own publication, The Molder.

The Senior High School (SHS) is a new department to cater the Senior High Schools Students under the K-12 Program. Currently there are three tracks/stands offer in the university namely: STEM, ABM, and HUMSS.

=== Biliran Campus ===
The Biliran Campus (formerly Biliran National Agricultural College), located in Biliran, Biliran, is the home of College of Agriculture, Fishery and Forestry (CAFF) and the extension program of Education.
