= National Transitional Council (Congo) =

Political body in the Republic of the Congo

The National Transition Council of Congo (French Conseil national de transition) was a political body in the Republic of the Congo that was involved in the composition of the 1997 General Sassou Nguesso's government, setting up a 75-member body in the place of the parliament.

The National Transitional Council adopted a new Constitution of Congo in May 2001. The new Constitution enabled the government to choose the date of presidential, parliament and local elections.

== Stance of UN ==
United Nations supported the National Transitional Council of the Republic of Congo.

Support the transition from the present National Transition Council - NTC (present transitional parliament) of the Republic of the Congo to a democratic institution capable of carrying out the tasks that are assigned to it, and to fulfill its legislative function to control the government’s actions and represent citizens in a way that promotes sustainable human development.

— UN
