= ISAP =

ISAP may refer to:

- Athens–Piraeus Electric Railways, a rapid transit line in Athens, Greece
- Information Security Automation Program, a U.S. government multi-agency initiative to enable automation and standardization of technical security operations
- International School of Asia and the Pacific
- International Society for Aviation Photography
- Internetowy System Aktów Prawnych, a database with information about the legislation in force in Poland
- Islamic State – Azerbaijan Province, a branch of the Islamic State
