= Ariga =

有賀 is a Japanese surname, read as either Ariga or Aruga. Notable people with the surname include:

- Akiko Aruga (有賀 秋子, born 1942), Japanese speed skater
- Katsuhiko Ariga (有賀 克彦, born 1962), Japanese chemist
- Kōsaku Aruga (有賀 幸作, 1897–1945), or less often by the alternate reading Kosaku Ariga, captain in the Imperial Japanese Navy
- Nagao Ariga (有賀 長雄, 1860–1921), or Nagao Aruga, Japanese jurist and historian
- Nobuo Ariga (有賀 啓雄, 1964–2023), also known as Hiroo Ariga (有賀 啓夫), Japanese singer-songwriter, bassist, arranger and record producer
