= Katsuhiko =

- Gender: Male

Origin
- Origin: Japanese
- Meaning: Different meanings depending on the kanji used

Katsuhiko (written: 勝彦, 克彦 or 勝比古) is a masculine Japanese given name. Notable people with the name include:

- Katsuhiko Ariga (有賀克彦; born 1962), Japanese chemist
- Katsuhiko Chikamori (近森克彦; born 1945), Japanese handball player
- Fusanishiki Katsuhiko (房錦 勝比古; 1936–1993), Japanese sumo wrestler
- Hokuten'yū Katsuhiko (北天佑 勝彦; 1960–2006), Japanese sumo wrestler
- Katsuhiko Kinoshita (born 1973), Japanese handball player and coach
- Katsuhiko Ishibashi (石橋 克彦; born 1944), Japanese seismologist
- Katsuhiko Kashiwazaki (柏崎 克彦; born 1951), Japanese judoka
- Katsuhiko Kawasoe (河添 克彦; born 1936), Japanese chief executive
- Katsuhiko Kumazaki (熊崎 勝彦; born 1942), Japanese baseball commissioner
- Katsuhiko Matsuda (松田 克彦; born 1965), Japanese decathlete
- Katsuhiko Murooka (室岡 克彦; born 1959), Japanese shogi player
- Katsuhiko Nagata (永田 克彦; born 1973), Japanese sport wrestler and mixed martial artist
- Katsuhiko Nakagawa (中川 勝彦; 1962–1994)Japanese actor and musician
- Katsuhiko Nakajima (中嶋 勝彦; born 1988), Japanese professional wrestler
- Katsuhiko Nishijima (西島 克彦; born 1960), Japanese anime director
- Katsuhiko Oku (奥 克彦; 1958–2003), Japanese diplomat
- Katsuhiko Sasaki (佐々木 勝彦; born 1944), Japanese actor and voice actor
- Katsuhiko Shinzato (新里 勝彦; born 1939), Japanese karateka
- Katsuhiko Sugita (杉田 勝彦; born 1946), Japanese basketball player
- Katsuhiko Sumii (角居 勝彦; born 1964), Japanese horse trainer
- Katsuhiko Taguchi (田口 勝彦; born 1972), Japanese rally driver
- Katsuhiko Takahashi (高橋 克彦; born 1947), Japanese writer
- Katsuhiko Tasaka (田坂 勝彦; 1914–1979), Japanese film director
- Katsuhiko Tokunaga (徳永克彦; born 1957), Japanese photographer
- Katsuhiko Umehara (梅原 克彦; born 1954), Japanese mayor
- Katsuhiko Yokomitsu (横光 克彦; born 1943), Japanese politician

== See also ==
- 7965 Katsuhiko, a main-belt asteroid named after Katsuhiko Sato (born 1945)
