= International Society for Aviation Photography =

- ISAP logo
- Abbreviation: ISAP
- Formation: 2001
- Founders: Jay Miller and Chad Slattery
- Type: 501(c)(3) nonprofit
- Purpose: Professional society for photographers
- Region served: Worldwide
- Members: c. 500
- Chairman: Larry Grace (2013)
- Website: aviationphoto.org

ISAP patch

The International Society for Aviation Photography (ISAP) is an international non-profit 501(c)(3) professional society centered on the topic of aviation photography. Members represent numerous fields including: professional photographers, writers, historians, publishers, trade representatives, pilots and serious enthusiasts. The society is also known by its acronym, ISAP, and the society's scope is to provide a major international forum for the art and science of aviation photography. Members provide a means for the exchange of aviation photography ideas, technique, philosophy, and equipment to other in the field. Most importantly, ISAP provides a mechanism for communication, education, and friendship among those who have a professional stake in, interest in, or simple love for aviation photography.

== History ==
ISAP was founded in 2001 by Jay Miller and Chad Slattery. As of 2010, ISAP has over 500 members from 20 different countries. In 2005 ISAP was granted 501(c)(3) tax-exempt status.

== ISAP Board (2017) ==
Chairman– Larry Grace

Vice chairman- Jim Wilson

Chairman Emeritus- Jay Miller

Treasurer – Gary Edwards

Secretary – Mike Collins

Legal- J.R. Wilson, Jr

ISAP board members (2017): George Kounis, Kevin Hong

Member advisers to the ISAP Board: John Sepp, Craig Swancy, Gary Edwards, Mark Bennett

Past board members: Jay Miller (President & Chairman), Chad Slattery (Vice Chair & V.P.), Jim Koepnick (Secretary), Joe Oliva (Secretary), Denny Lombard (Secretary), Paul Bowen, David Carlson, Russell Munson, Caroline Sheen, Eric Schulzinger, Katsuhiko Tokunaga, Richard VanderMeulen, Jessica Ambats, and George Hall

== Symposiums ==
Since 2001, a symposium has been organized by ISAP each year to bring together members for a variety of events including guest speakers, workshops, and field trips.

ISAP I- February 22–25, 2001 Ft. Worth, Texas USA

ISAP II- February 28 – March 2, 2002 Mesa, Arizona USA

ISAP III- February 27 – March 1, 2003 Dayton, Ohio USA

ISAP IV- March 18–20, 2004 Las Vegas, Nevada USA

ISAP V- March 3–5, 2005 Washington, DC USA

ISAP VI- April 20–22, 2006 San Diego, California USA

ISAP VII- March 15–17, 2007 Pensacola, Florida USA

ISAP VIII- February 28, 29 and March 1, 2008 Fort Worth, Texas USA

ISAP IX- March 4–6, 2010 Las Vegas, Nevada USA

ISAP X- June 2–4, 2011 San Diego, California USA

ISAP XI- May 17–19, 2012 Virginia Beach, VA USA

ISAP XII- May 16–18, 2013 Seattle, WA USA

ISAP XIII- April 3–5, 2014 Tampa, FL USA

ISAP Ultimate Access Dream Shoot- May 22-23, 2015 Dallas, TX USA

2016 Mini-Symposium- October 13-14, 2016 Fort Worth, TX USA

ISAP XIV- March 15–17, 2018 Tucson, AZ USA

== ISAP Magazine ==
ISAP produces a periodic magazine titled ISnAP.

ISnAP Editor: Kevin Hong

ISnAP International Editor: Mike Green

== George Hall Lifetime Achievement Award ==
The society awards its annual Award of Excellence to recognize outstanding aviation photography. Individuals who have contributed to the fields of photography, publishing, aviation, or space technology are eligible, and the society considers lifetime careers impact to photography of aviation or space subjects.

List of Recipients:

- 2001 Katsuhiko Tokunaga
- 2002 Judson Brohmer
- 2003 Robert Lawson, Howard Levy and Dick Stouffer
- 2004 William Larkins
- 2005 Sandor Aldott
- 2006 George Hall
- 2007 Bill Williams
- 2008 Paul Bowen
- 2011 Phil Makanna
- 2012 Jim Koepnick
- 2013 Denny Lombard
- 2014 Russell Munson
- 2017 Jay Miller
