= Cropping (image) =

Removing unwanted outer parts of an image

Cropping is the removal of unwanted outer areas from a photographic or illustrated image. The process usually consists of the removal of some of the peripheral areas of an image to remove extraneous visual data from the picture, improve its framing, change the aspect ratio, or accentuate or isolate the subject matter from its background. Depending on the application, this can be performed on a physical photograph, artwork, or film footage, or it can be achieved digitally by using image editing software. The process of cropping is common to the photographic, film processing, broadcasting, graphic design, and printing businesses.

== In photography, print, and design ==
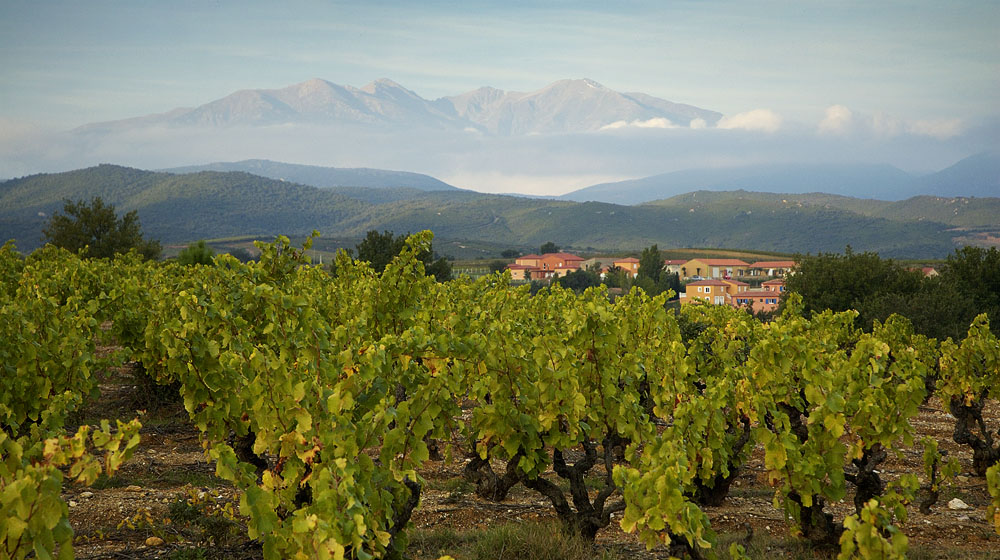
Wide view, uncropped photograph

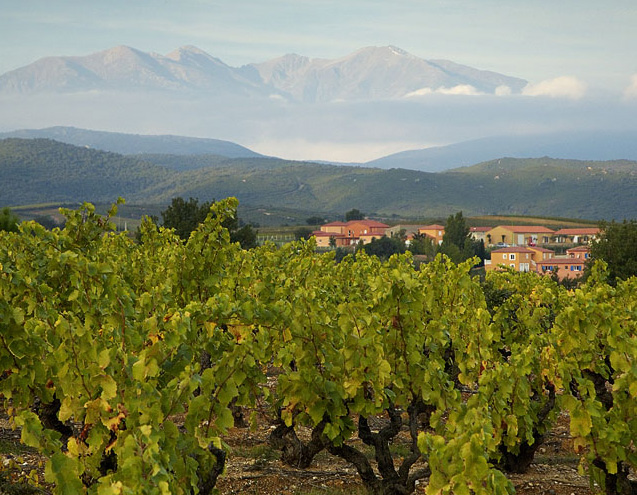
Cropped version, accentuating the subject

In the printing, graphic design and photography industries, cropping is the removal of unwanted areas from the periphery of a photographic or illustrated image. Cropping is one of the most basic photo manipulation processes, and it is carried out to remove an unwanted object or irrelevant noise from the periphery of a photograph, change its aspect ratio, or improve the overall composition.

In telephoto photography, most commonly in avian and aviation photography, an image is cropped to magnify the primary subject and further reduce the angle of view. When a lens of sufficient focal length to achieve the desired magnification directly is not available, it is considered one of the few editing actions permissible in modern photojournalism along with tonal balance, color correction and sharpening. A cropping made by trimming off the top and bottom margins of a photograph, or a film, produces a view that mimics the panoramic format (in photography) or the widescreen format in cinematography and broadcasting. Neither of these formats is cropped as such, but rather they are products of highly specialized optical configurations and camera designs.

=== Graphic examples (photography) ===
Cropping in order to emphasize the subject:

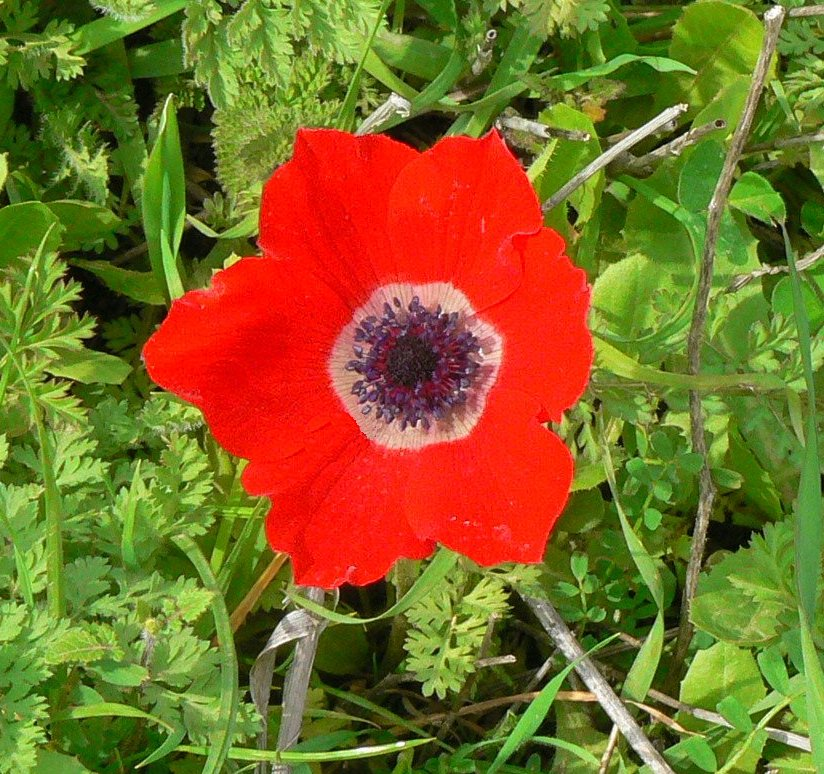
Cropped image of Anemone coronaria, aspect ratio 1.065, in which the flower fills most of the frame

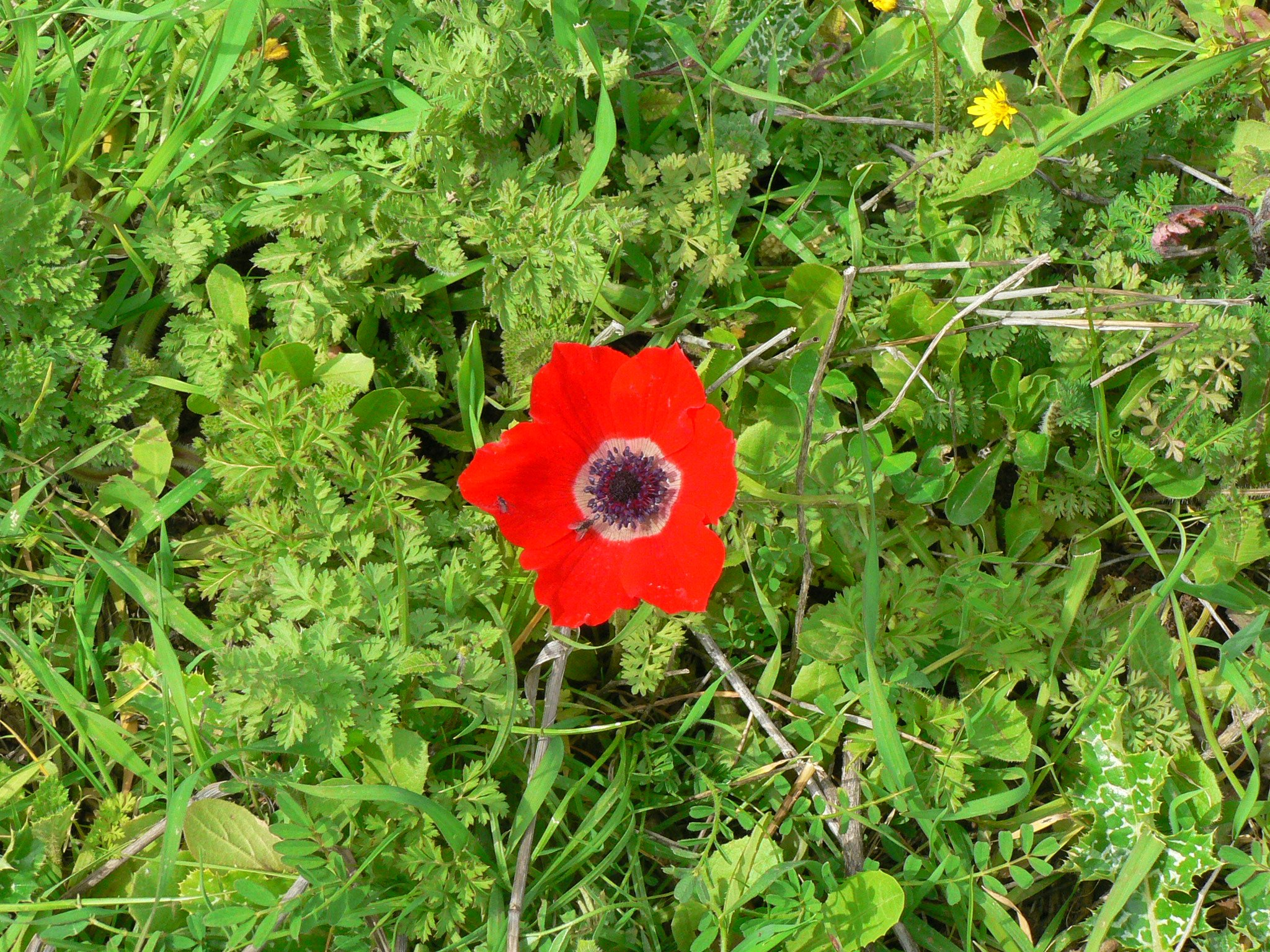
The original photo, aspect ratio 1.333, in which the flower uses only a small part of the frame

Cropping in order to remove unwanted details/objects:

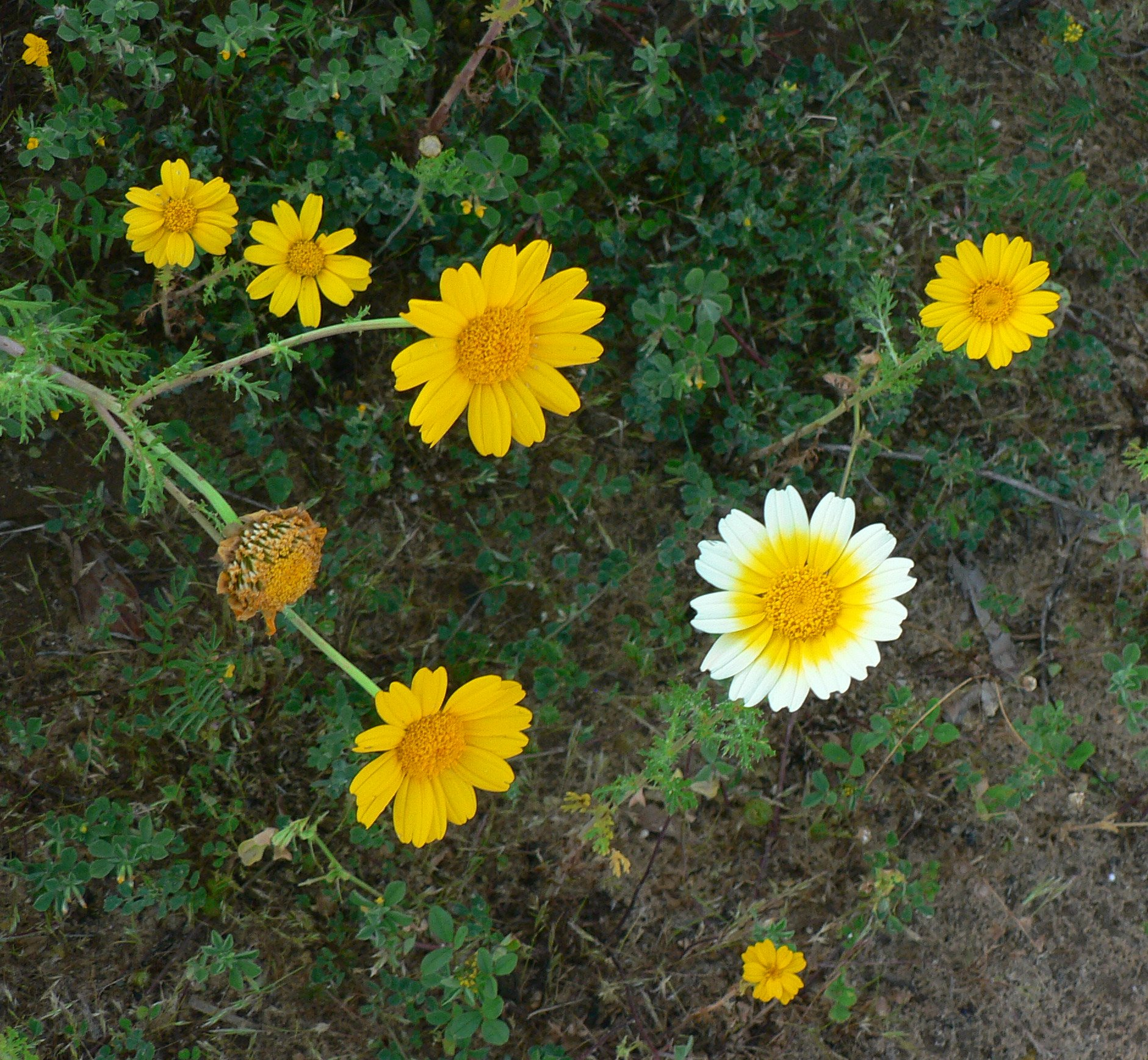
Cropped image of Garland chrysanthemum, aspect ratio 1.081

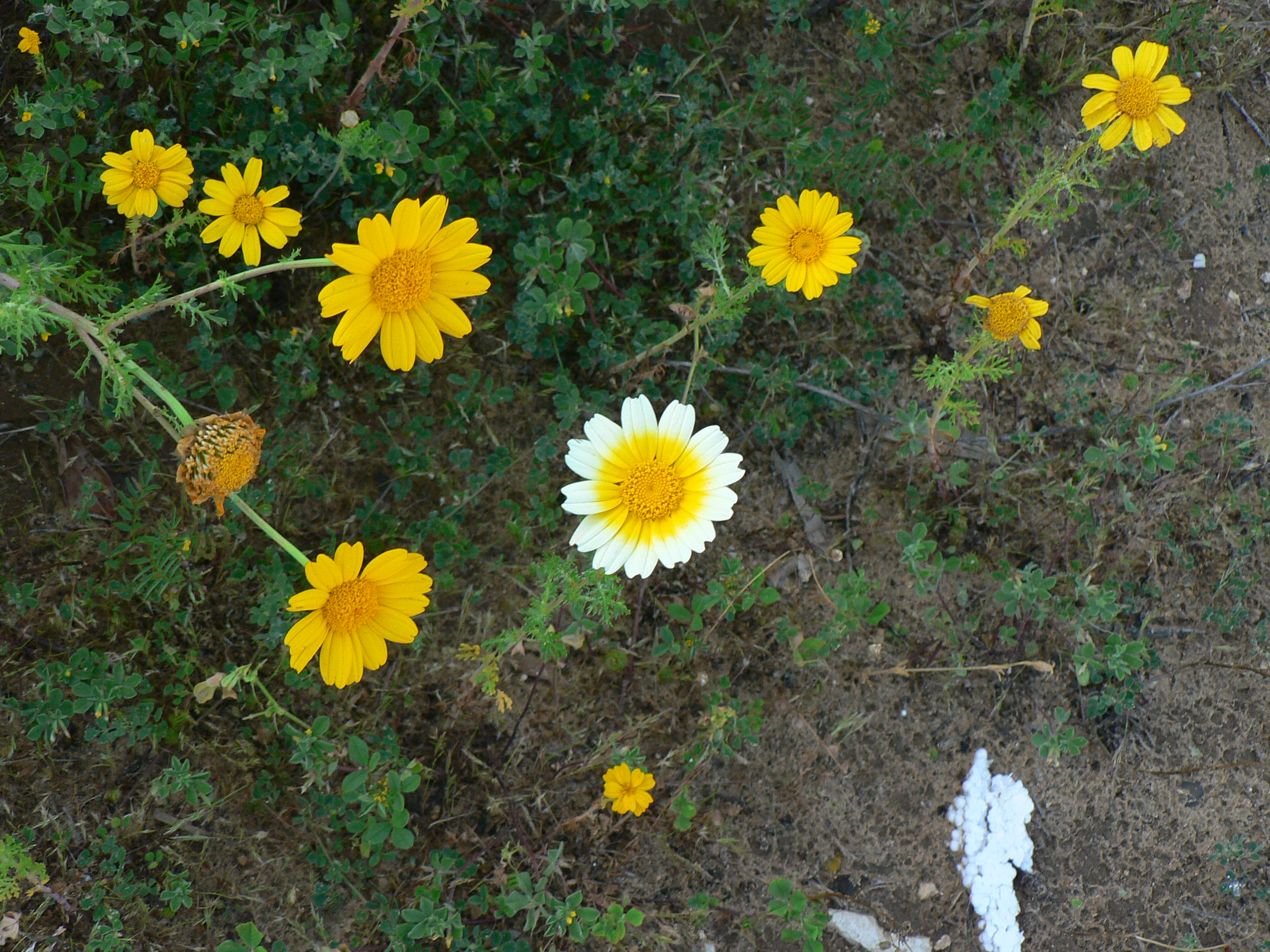
The original photo, aspect ratio 1.333; the lower right part shows some white-colored trash and the upper right shows a dead flower, and both are unwanted objects.

=== Crop marks ===
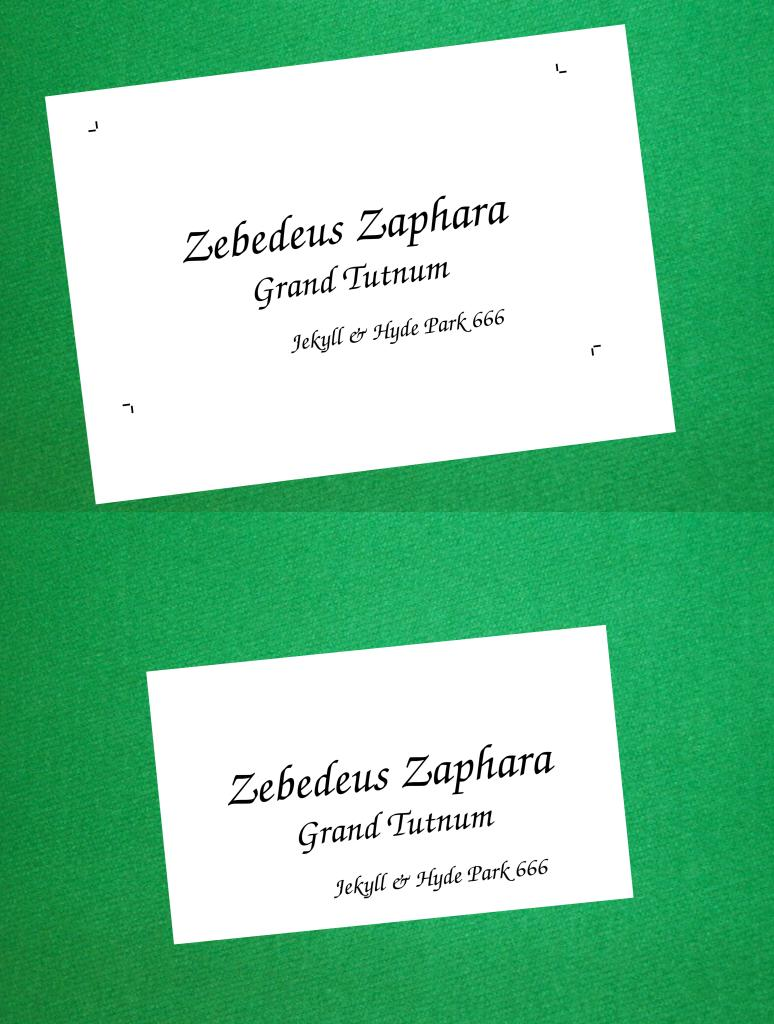
Visiting card before and after cropping

To assist in precise cropping of a printed image, crop marks may be printed at the four corners of the image, just outside the central area to be retained: ⌏ at the top left corner, ⌎ at the top right corner, ⌍ at the bottom left corner, and ⌌ at the bottom right corner. The paper or paperboard on which the image is printed can then be cut on each side so that the crop marks are removed.

In Unicode, the crop marks are represented by:

- U+230F ⌏ TOP LEFT CROP
- U+230E ⌎ TOP RIGHT CROP
- U+230D ⌍ BOTTOM LEFT CROP
- U+230C ⌌ BOTTOM RIGHT CROP

Crop marks are useful for cropping images printed with bleed, and more generally, when the position of an image on the final sheet is not precisely known in advance.

== In cinematography and broadcasting ==
In certain circumstances, film footage may be cropped to change it from one aspect ratio to another, without stretching the image or filling the blank spaces with letterbox bars (fig. 2).

Concerns about aspect ratios are a major issue in filmmaking. Rather than cropping, the cinematographer usually uses mattes to increase the latitude for alternative aspect ratios in projection and broadcast. Anamorphic optics (such as Panavision lenses) produce a full-frame, horizontally compressed image from which broadcasters and projectionists can matte a number of alternative aspect ratios without cropping relevant image detail. Without this, widescreen reproduction, especially for television broadcasting, is dependent upon a variety of soft matting techniques such as letterboxing, which involves varying degrees of image cropping (see figures 2, 3 and 4).

Since the advent of widescreen television, a similar process has removed large chunks from the top & bottom to make a standard 4:3 image fit a 16:9 one, losing 25 percent of the original image. Another option is a process called pillarboxing, where black bands are placed down the sides of the screen, allowing the original image to be shown full-frame within the wider aspect ratio (fig. 6).

Similarly, movies are sometimes filmed in a taller aspect ratio such as 1.78:1 (Super 35) or 1.43:1 (IMAX), for release on 16:9 electronic media or for presentation on IMAX or other special format screens, with the intention of cropping the top and/or bottom parts of the image for regular widescreen presentations such as 2.39:1. Here, the cinematographer can ensure that all relevant elements are contained in the cropped image section, and that the visual composition reflects the director's intentions in both the cropped and un-cropped versions.

Typical cropping in cinematographic and broadcast applications

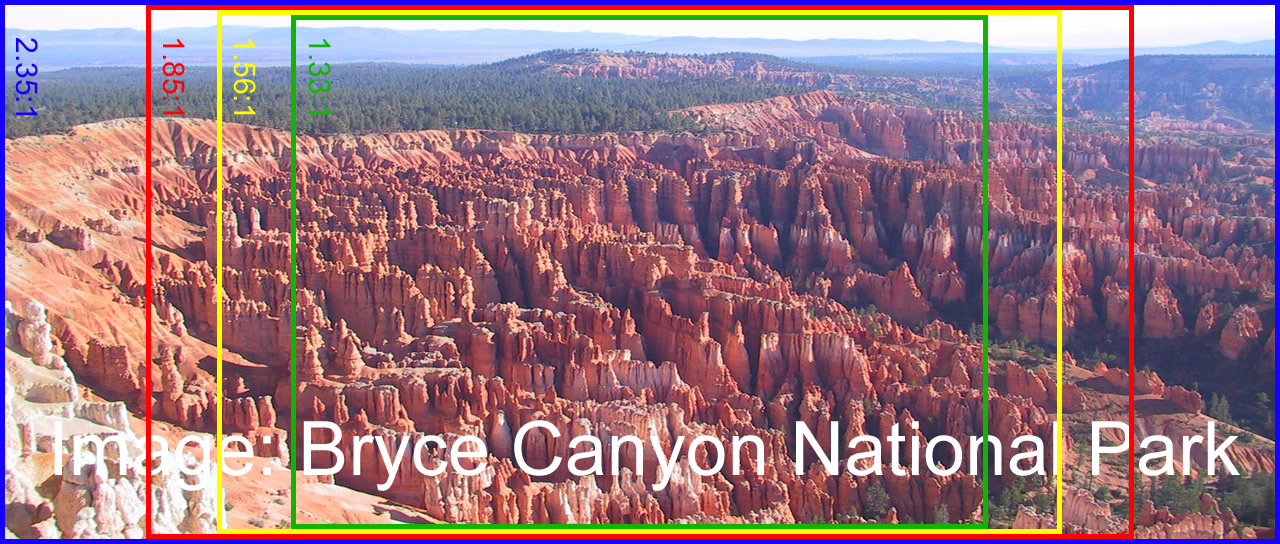
Figure 1:
2.35:1 original image with widescreen aspect ratio, showing alternative aspect ratios.

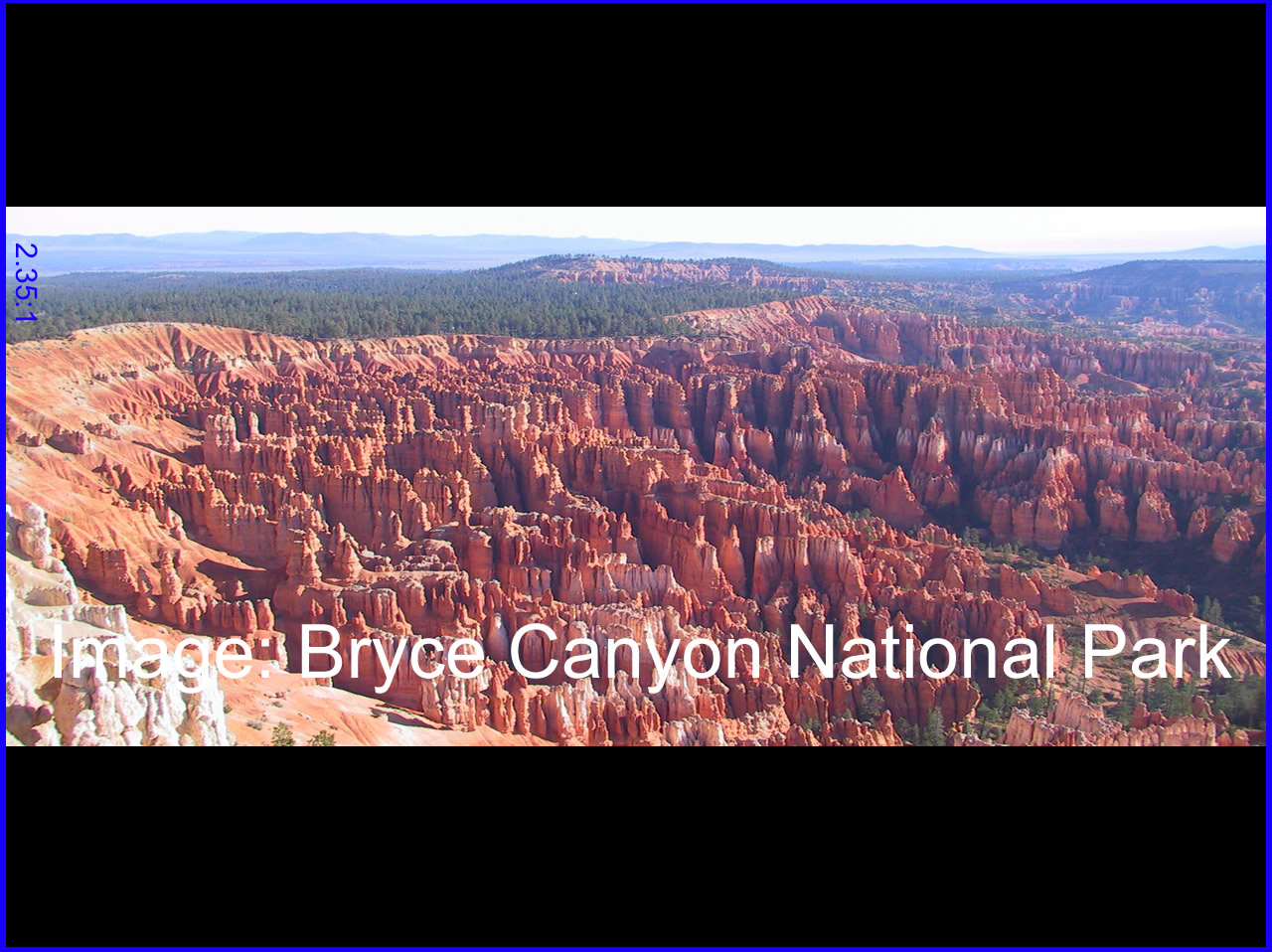
Figure 2:
2.35:1 image with letterbox resized to 4:3; the whole image is visible.

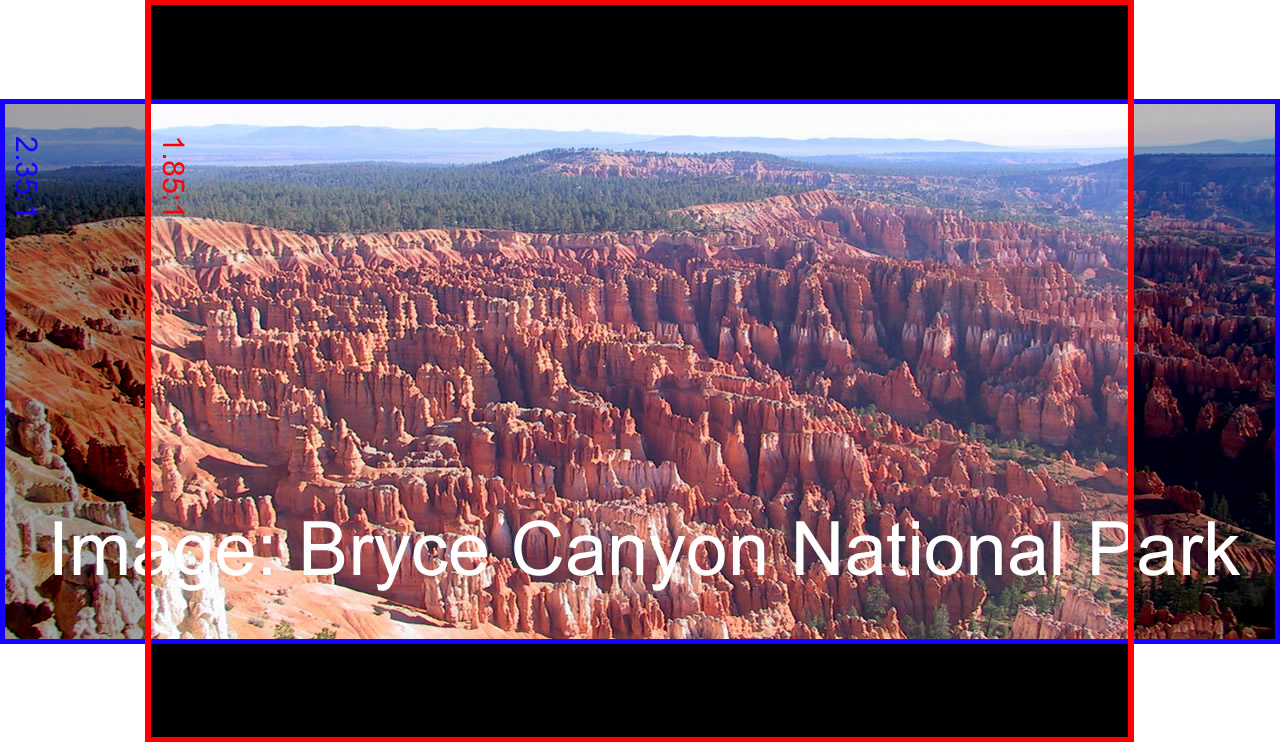
Figure 3:
1.85:1 image with letterbox resized to 4:3. Typical 16:9 image; the outer edges of the image are not visible.

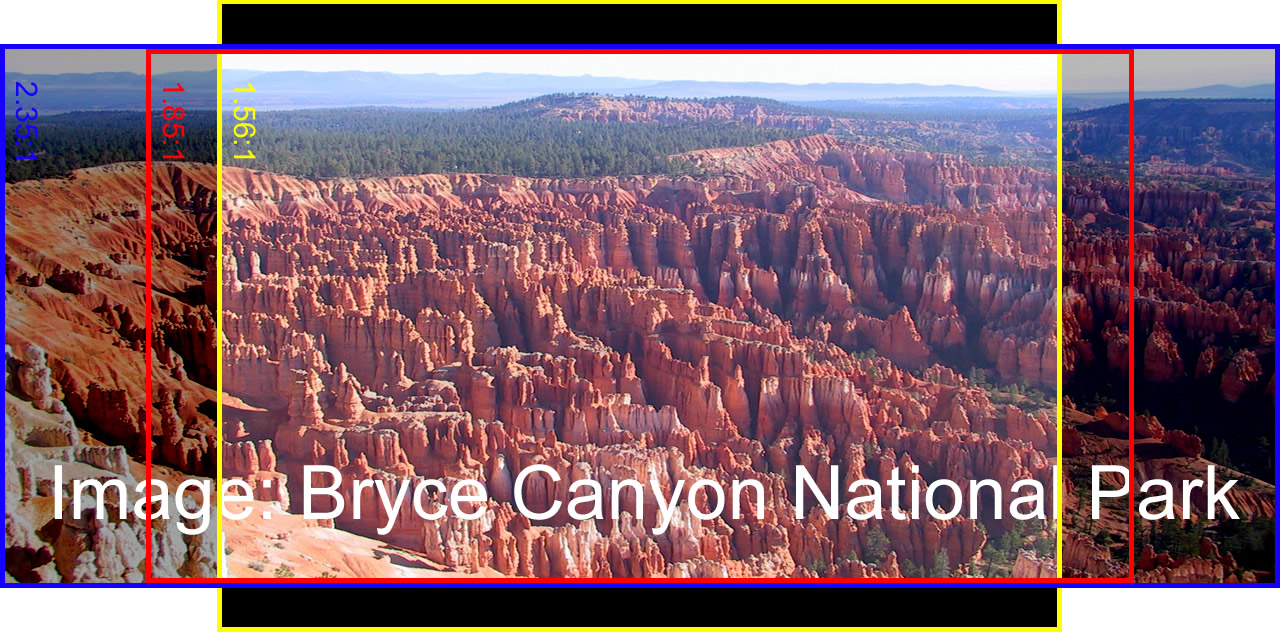
Figure 4:
1.55:1 image with letterbox resized to 4:3. A compromise between 16:9 and 4:3, often broadcast in the UK.

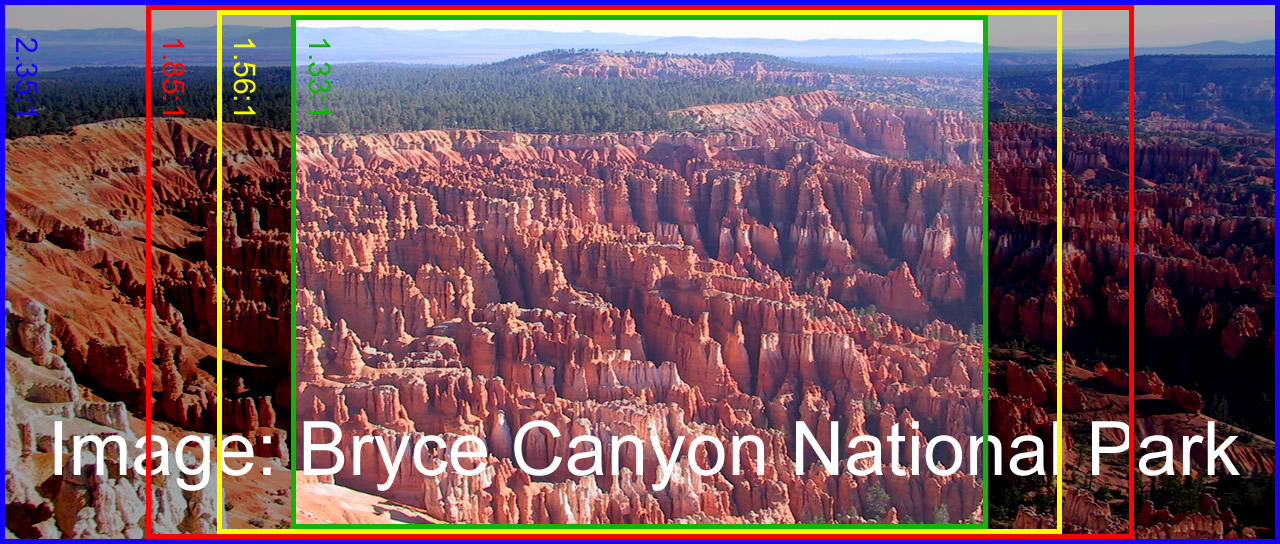
Figure 5:
1.33:1 image without letterbox, because it is cropped to 4:3, losing much of the original.

== Additional methods ==
Various methods may be used following cropping or may be used on the original image.

- Vignetting is the accentuation of the central portion of an image by blurring, darkening, lightening, or desaturation of peripheral portions of the image
- The use of nonrectangular mat or picture frame may be used for selection of portions of a larger image

== Digital image manipulation ==
In order to "un-crop" or extend an image for which no further image data exists, texture synthesis can be emloyed, which artificially adds a band around an image, synthetically "uncropping" it. This is effective if the band smoothly blends with the existing image, which is relatively easy if the edge of the image has low detail or is a chaotic natural pattern such as sky or grass, but does not work if discernible objects are cut off at the boundary, such as half a car. An uncrop plug-in exists for the GIMP image editor.

Current generative AI models are able to modify or animate existing images, including generation of a realistic lateral extension of the image.

== See also ==
- Bleed (printing) – Type of printing technique
- Digital zoom
