= Gang run printing =

Printing multiple projects on a common paper sheet

Gang-run printing describes a printing method in which multiple printing projects are placed on a common paper sheet in an effort to reduce printing costs and paper waste. Gang runs are generally used with sheet-fed printing presses and CMYK process color jobs, which require four separate plates that are loaded into the press.

Gang-run printing allows multiple jobs to share the setup cost, including creating plates and preparing the press. It takes up to 250 sheets for a "make ready," which is the process of getting the plates inked up and the ink levels set correctly. As a result, in offset printing, the first sheet costs more than the next 1,000.

Printers use the term "gang run" or "gang" to describe the practice of placing many print projects on the same sheet or piggybacking a project on a vacant, unused portion of a print sheet. Sheet-fed presses are generally "full sheet" (28" x 40"), "half sheet" (28" x 19"), or "quarter sheet" (13" x 19"). For example, a 28" x 40" sheet can hold 9 4" x 6" at 5,000 or 18 2,500 postcards (each card takes 4.25" x 6.25" on the sheet to accommodate full bleed. Gang-run printing has been one of the driving forces in the large drop in the price for full-color printing.

== Advantages ==
- Extremely economical—many print jobs share the same print run, which reduces manpower, plates, prep time, and press washup labor.
- Reduces waste—less paper goes unused.

== Disadvantages ==
- Lack of paper stock choice—you must choose the paper stock common to all the projects on the same sheet
- Lack of color control—color balance on a gang print run is difficult to maintain. Since so many other print projects are placed side by side, a gang print project is harder to control for color quality issues
- Ghosting—because an adjacent project may have a heavy solid color that may affect your final result
- Hard to accommodate custom print quantities—normally
- Reprints cost more—rerunning a print job from the sample plate would mean reproducing unwanted copies of adjacent projects sharing the same sheet or plate
- Harder to get custom colors or cut—by nature of the press run, it is harder to get custom spot colors, varnish effects, or coatings.
- Timing issues—gang printing customers normally need to be more patient with their client, since it takes more time and effort to coordinate all the jobs through the singer viewer.

== Restrictions ==
The U.S. Food and Drug Administration (FDA) warns to be aware of the potential of foreign packages, which may come from gang printing at the package supplier. Pharmaceutical labels and packaging materials are higher in cost primarily as a result of the additional costs in manufacturing due to segregation, traceability, and security requirements. You cannot gang run pharmaceutical labels that require strict line clearance between label kinds, unless the labeling from gang-printed sheets is adequately differentiated by size, shape, or color (21 CFR Part 211.122f).
