= Air-to-air =

Air-to-air can refer to:

- Air-to-air combat
- Air-to-air missile
- Air-to-air photography
- Air-to-air refueling
- Air-to-air rocket
- Air-to-air refrigeration

== See also ==
- anti-aircraft and 'anti-air' (adj.)
- Air (disambiguation)
- AA (disambiguation)
