= Mariusz Adamski =

American photographer

Mariusz 'Mike' Adamski
- Born: 10 January 1974 (age 52)
- Known for: Photographer and author
- Website: mariuszadamski.com

Mariusz "Mike" Adamski (born January 10, 1974) is a USA resident, an American aerial photographer, media manager and defense analyst who has flown many times worldwide with the United States Air Force and Polish Air Force at Krzesiny Air Base. He is a graduate of the National Defense University in Warsaw, Poland. Adamski's works have been published in books, postage stamps, important journals and aviation publications, such as Aviation Week & Space Technology, Air Forces Monthly and Flight International.

He is a part of the team of the aviation magazine Skrzydlata Polska (Wings of Poland). He is a member of ISAP - International Society for Aviation Photography and ZPAF - Związek Polskich Artystów Fotografików (Association of Polish Art Photographers). Adamski is known for shooting aircraft from unusual perspectives such as a runway centerline with takeoff jet wake ruffling his clothes or through air-to-air photography.

== Biography ==
Adamski specializes in the air-to-air photography on board of maneuverable, supersonic aircraft. He spends hours preparing for aerial sessions and annually puts in research at the Military Institute of Aviation Medicine in Warsaw where he undergoes a series of tests that fighter pilots must experience.

Adamski was the first Pole to be admitted by the American authorities to Cheyenne Mountain Complex (NORAD) and Schriever Air Force Base, where the command and control center of GPS satellites is located. He also aerially photographed the strategic stealth bomber such as the B-2 Spirit.

In 2008, Adamski documented the transfer of C-130E military aircraft from the United States Air Force to the Polish Air Force at Waco, Texas. President George W. Bush had promised the aircraft to equip Poland's heavy airlift needs. This photo shoot was published in the May 2008 Skrzydlata Polska. In May 2008, Adamski traveled to Fort Worth, Texas to photograph 48 F-16 Fighting Falcons being manufactured for the Polish Air Force.

During the 11th Annual Polish Air Show in Radom, a direct link off their website directed viewers and referred to Adamski as a "world famous aerial-photographer" and featured his bio. A photo display of his work was also present.

In 2018 he obtained US citizenship.

== Publications ==
Adamski has published hundreds of covers in books and magazines and also three authors books - Where Eagles Dare, Reaching for the Sky, and the Passion of Flight, School of Dreams and Per Aspera Ad Astra. He gave a speech at the International Aviation Photography conference in Pensacola, Florida in March 2007.

In 2007 he also published an album collection of 96 photos taken by him over three years. One of the photos is a unique photograph capture of an F-16 in the aerial refueling position from the boom perspective of the pilot.
