= Medical Colleges of Northern Philippines =

Private college in Cagayan, Philippines

- Kolehiyong Medikal ng Hilagang Pilipinas (Filipino)
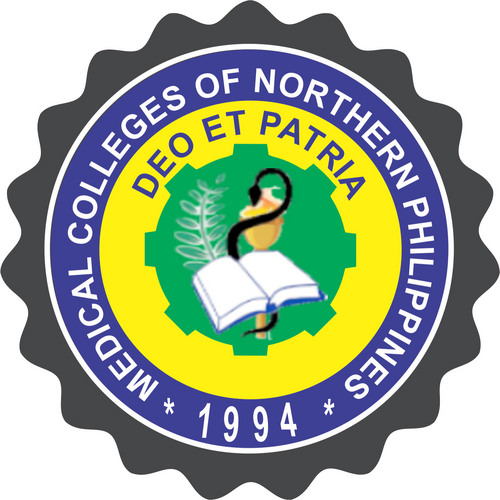
- Motto: Deum et Patriam Serviam (Latin)
- Motto in English: I will serve God and Country.
- Type: Private Non-Sectarian
- Established: February 23, 1994
- Affiliations: PRISAA
- President: Ronald Pagela Guzman M.D.
- Administrative staff: approx. 500
- Students: approx. 6,000
- Location: Alimannao Hills, Peñablanca, Cagayan, Philippines; 17°38′32″N 121°45′41″E
- Official Student Publication: "The Quill"
- Colors: Blue and Yellow
- Nickname: MCNP Eagles
- Mascot: "Bagwis"
- Website: mcnp.edu.ph
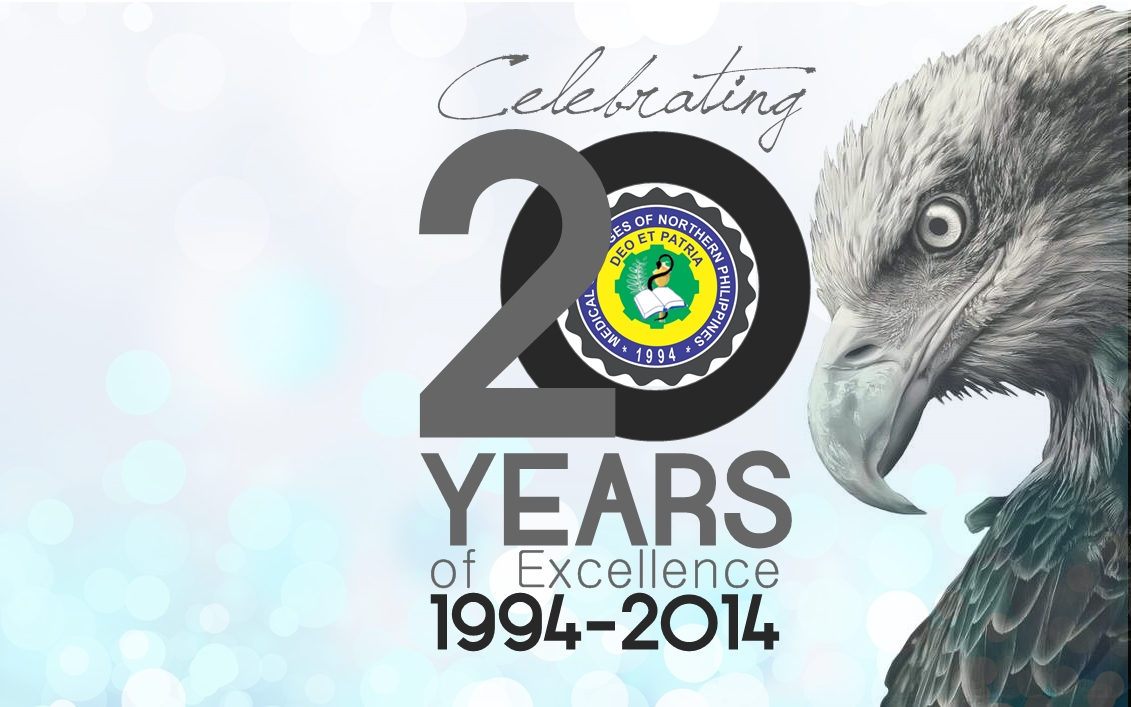

- Location in Luzon Location in the Philippines

Medical Colleges of Northern Philippines (MCNP) is a private, nonsectarian, tertiary-level, learning institution in Cagayan Valley, Philippines that offers courses for health professions. It was established in 1994 by Doctor Ronald P. Guzman, referred to as "Father Eagle" by the school's stakeholders.

MCNP was granted an Award of Recognition for being assessed as Category a(t), Mature Teaching Institution under the Institutional Monitoring and Evaluation for Quality Assurance (IQUAME), as one of the first three Higher Education Institutions assessed nationwide and the only HEI in Region 2 on March 18, 2008. Currently, it has the 2nd highest number of enrollees in Region 2.

MCNP has a twin learning institution, the International School of Asia and the Pacific (ISAP), which offers international courses, and produces graduates in Customs Administration and Criminology.

It currently has two base hospitals: Dr. Ronald P. Guzman Medical Center and Holy Infant Hospital.

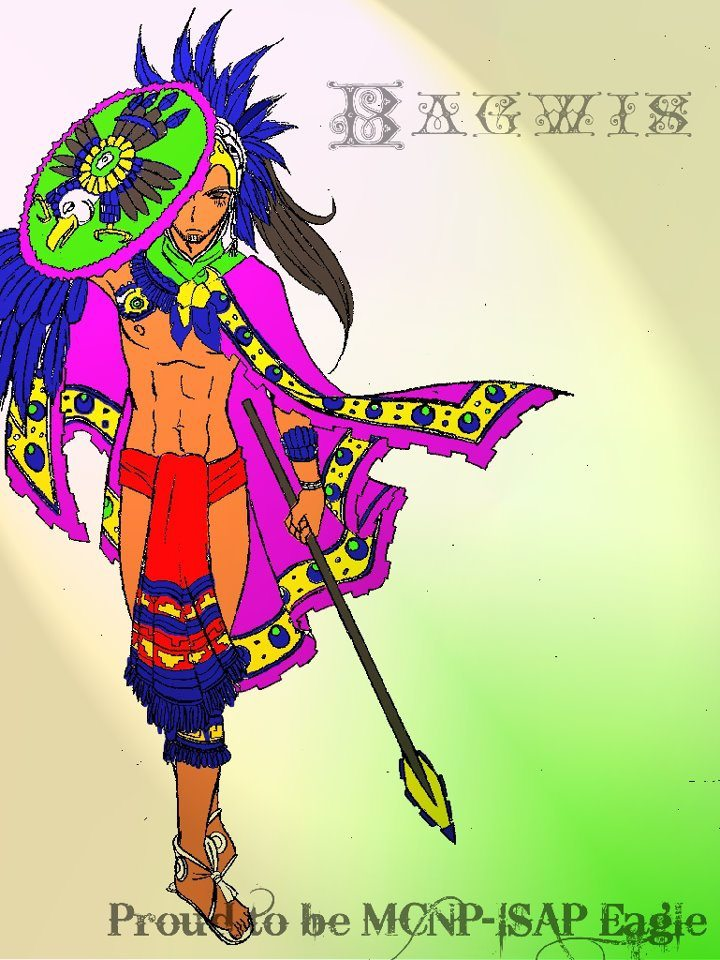
Bagwis, MCNP-ISAP Official Mascot

== History ==
In December 1971, Dr. Ronald Pagela Guzman, a medical doctor, established the Holy Infant Clinic, a 15-bed capacity health care facility situated at Centro Uno, Tuao, Cagayan. The clinic was a way of serving the people of Tuao where he was born and where he and his wife, Wilma Roa, a nurse, resided for quite some time after graduating from college. The clinic is a community hospital setup for family-centered care. The patients bring their linens and other needs without paying accommodation fees. A detached kitchen is available where the patient’s nutrition is prepared by a family member(s).

The clinic rendered services from birth to death. Geographically, Tuao during that time had no link to the nearby municipalities as it is surrounded by the Chico River, a tributary of the Cagayan River. During the rainy season, the river can overflow to the point that no motorboat can cross. Hence, appendectomy cesarean section at Tuao Emergency Hospital is done in emergency cases. Dr. Guzman also trained a community worker in embalming to assist the community in revering the departed.

House calls and home visits were done for those who could not come to the clinic to receive treatment and care. Tuberculosis was prevalent and management was carried out during home visits after the initial assessment and diagnosis in the clinic.

The Holy Infant Clinic, Tuao was operated as a satellite when a 35-bed capacity Holy Infant Clinic, Tuguegarao was established on July 7, 1980.

Dr. Evelyn Duque served as the resident physician while Grace and Filomena Roa headed the group of nurses and caregivers who continued to care for the community. This went on for 2 years, a transition that allowed Tuao to produce its own doctors so that continuity to care from private practitioners went on.

Dr. and Mrs. Ronald P. Guzman had a 2-year stint in Nigeria where they worked at Bendel State Hospital, Benin City, Bendel State. Upon return to the Philippines, Holy Infant Clinic Tuguegarao was born. Through the years, it prospered, and the hospital services expanded with the opening of the Medical, Surgical, Pediatric, and OB-GYNE Departments. It is also complemented with the addition of diagnostic services such as X-ray, Ultrasound, and Laboratory Services with a Drug Testing Facility and Pharmacy.

In 1994, Dr. Ronald envisioned that education is the antidote to ignorance, poverty, and disease. With this advocacy, he established Medical Colleges of Northern Philippines (MCNP), a school that led to the fruition in 1998 of another school which is the International School of Asia and the Pacific (ISAP), offering courses that are relevant and responsive to local, national and global demands. Through the years, MCNP and ISAP have earned the reputation as two of the most prestigious and top-performing schools in the country producing global professionals. MCNP was granted an Award of Recognition for being assessed as Category a(t), Mature Teaching Institution under the Institutional Monitoring and Evaluation for Quality Assurance (IQUAME), as one of the three Higher Education Institutions assessed nationwide and the only HEI in Region 2 on March 18, 2008.

Today, Christian Guzman MBA, Melissa Dee-Guzman, Dr. Christopher Mark R. Guzman, an ortho-surgeon, Dr. Charles Ronald R. Guzman, an Internist-lung specialist, Dr. Aileen, a pediatrician, attorneys Cristina Guzman-Natividad, Jose Eduardo L. Natividad and Olivia Olalia-Guzman, children of the founders, are second generation medical practitioners and legal counsels of the institutions.

In October 2010, Holy Infant Clinic became the largest privately-run hospital by bed capacity in Region 2 with the emergence of Dr. Ronald P. Guzman Medical Center, a 250-bed-capacity Tertiary Hospital. The Philhealth department with its 150-bed capacity is the first in Region 2 that caters to the needs of the disadvantaged and marginalized.

Currently, the two schools have produced for the past 15 years a total of 115 board topnotches and adjudged as top rankers in the licensure examination both in the regional and national level. The schools have grown so fast that it has now the 2nd largest enrollment in the tertiary level in the region. The dynamism Dr. and Mrs. Guzman sparked and the generosity he and his wife generated was made more manifest when he extended scholarship and financial support to 32% of his school’s student population composed mostly of children of poor families. The school has provided assistance to the following special groups: student orphans, indigenous people, honor students, children of elementary and high school teachers, children of rebel returnees, members of the PNP and AFP, and other groups needing assistance.

== Programs and Courses ==
=== Academic Courses ===
- Doctor of Medicine (in progress)
- Bachelor of Science in Pharmacy
- Bachelor in Medical Laboratory Science (Bachelor of Science in Medical Technology)
- Bachelor of Science in Nursing
- Bachelor of Science in Radiologic Technology
- Bachelor of Science in Physical Therapy
- Diploma in Midwifery
- Diploma in Dental Technology
- Diploma in Pharmacy Aide

=== Academic programs ===
- Academic Tracking Program
- Course Audit Program
- Education on Wheels Program
- Enrichment and Remediation Clinics
- Language Proficiency Program
- Rubrics Development Program

== Affiliating Health Institutions and Agency ==
- Cagayan Valley Medical Center
- Dr. Ronald P. Guzman Medical Center
- Holy Infant Hospital
- Dr. Jose Reyes Memorial Medical Center
- San Lazaro Hospital
- Philippine Orthopedic Center
- Saint Paul Hospital Tuguegarao
- Philippine General Hospital
- Makati Medical Center
- Amang Rodriguez Memorial Medical Center
- Cardinal Santos Medical Center
- Lung Center Of The Philippines
- Baguio General Hospital
- University of the East Ramon Magsaysay Memorial Medical center
- Cagayan Valley Adventist Hospital
- Philippines Children Medical Center
- Philippines Heart Center
- East Avenue Medical Center
- Veterans Hospital Bayombong Nueva Viscaya
