= International School of Asia and the Pacific =

Private international school in Cagayan, Philippines

International School of Asia and The Pacific
- Motto: Culture Service Excellence
- Type: Private
- Established: February 23, 1997
- Affiliations: PRISAA
- President: Christian R. Guzman, MBA (Officer in Command)
- Administrative staff: approx. 200
- Students: approx. 2,000 (Including Alumni)
- Location: Alimannao Hills, Peñablanca, Cagayan, Philippines; 17°38′34″N 121°45′40″E
- Other campuses: Tabuk City Campus; Quezon City Campus
- Colors: Maroon and white
- Nickname: ISAP Mighty Eagles
- Website: isap.edu.ph
- Location in Luzon Location in the Philippines

International School of Asia and the Pacific (ISAP) is an international school in Cagayan province, Philippines. It provides International Education Programs and Courses. It was founded by Dr. Ronald P. Guzman, three years after he established Medical Colleges of Northern Philippines.

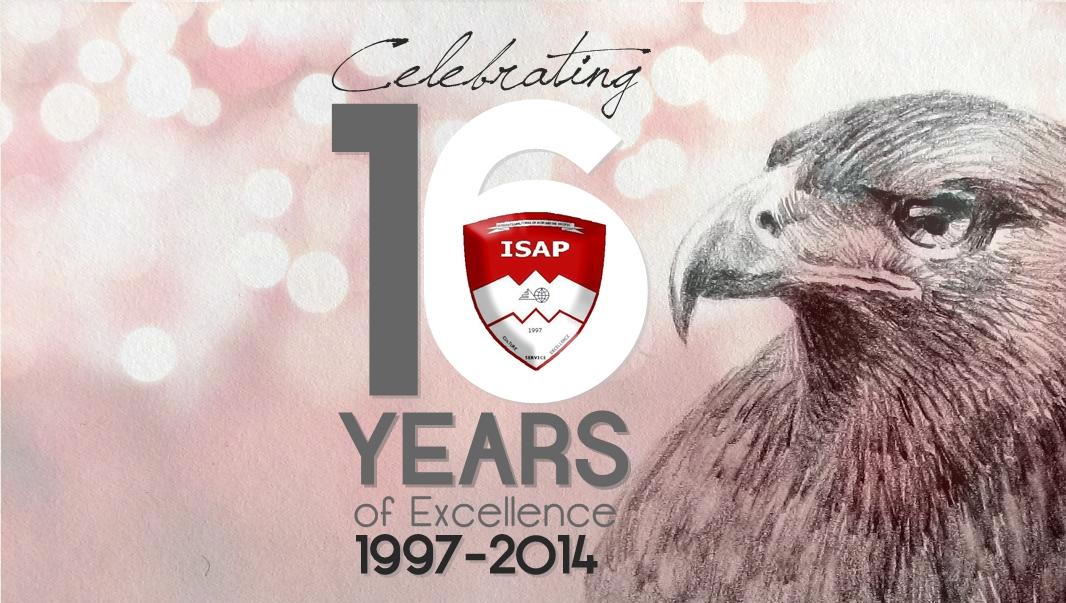
The 16th anniversary of International School of Asia and the Pacific

The institution has produced caliber graduates and board topnotchers in Customs Administration and Criminology.

== History ==
In December 1971, Dr. Ronald Pagela Guzman, a medical Doctor, established the Holy Infant Clinic, a 15-bed capacity health care facility situated at Centro Uno, Tuao, Cagayan. This way of serving the people of Tuao where he was born and where he and his wife, Wilma Roa, a nurse, resided for quite sometime after graduating from college. It is a community hospital where the set up is family centered care. The patients bring their linens and other needs without paying for accommodation fee. A detached kitchen is available where patient’s nutrition is prepared by a family member(s). They rendered services from birth to death. Geographically, Tuao during that time had no link to the rest of the municipalities as it is surrounded by the Chico River, a tributary of the Cagayan River. During rainy season, the river can overflow that no motor boat can cross. Hence, appendectomy caesarean section at Tuao Emergency Hospital is done in emergency cases. Dr. Guzman trained a community worker to do embalming to assist the community folks revere their beloved departed. House calls and home visits were done for those who cannot come to the clinic to receive treatment and care. Tuberculosis was prevalent and management was carried out during home visits after the initial assessment and diagnosis in the clinic. The Holy Infant Clinic, Tuao was operated as a satellite when a 35-bed capacity Holy Infant Clinic, Tuguegarao was established on July 7, 1980. Dr. Evelyn Duque served as the resident physician while Grace and Filomena Roa, headed the group of nurses and caregivers who continued to care for the community. This went on for 2 years, a transition that allowed Tuao to produce its own doctors so that continuity to care from private practitioners went on. Dr. and Mrs. Ronald P. Guzman has a 2-year stint in Nigeria where they worked at Bendel State Hospital, Benin City, Bendel State. Upon return in the Philippines, Holy Infant Clinic Tuguegarao was born. Through the years, it prospered and the hospital services expanded with the opening of the Medical, Surgical, Pediatric and OB-GYNE Departments. It is also complemented with the addition of diagnostic services such as X-ray, Ultrasound, Laboratory Services with Drug Testing Facility and Pharmacy. In 1994, Dr. Ronald, envisioned that education is the antidote to ignorance, poverty and disease. With this advocacy, he established Medical Colleges of Northern Philippines (MCNP), a school that led to the fruition in 1998 of another school which is the International School of Asia and the Pacific (ISAP), offering courses that are relevant and responsive to local, national and global demands. Through the years, MCNP and ISAP have earned the reputation as two of the most prestigious and top performing schools in the country producing global professionals. MCNP was granted an Award of Recognition for being assessed as Category a(t), Mature Teaching Institution under the Institutional Monitoring and Evaluation for Quality Assurance (IQUAME), as one of the three Higher Education Institutions assessed nationwide and the only HEI in Region 2 on March 18, 2008. Today, Dr. Christopher Mark R. Guzman, an ortho-surgeon, Dr. Charles Ronald R. Guzman, Internist-lung specialist, Dr. Aileen, a Pediatrician together with Atty. Cristina Guzman and Atty. Olivia Olalia-Guzman, children of the founders, are second generation medical practitioners and legal counsels of the institutions. In October 2010, the humble beginnings of the Holy Infant Clinic will metamorphose into becoming the leading privately run hospital in Region 2 with the emergence of the Dr. Ronald P. Guzman Medical Center, a 250 bed-capacity Tertiary Hospital that will take pride of a state-of-the-art facility with MRI, CT scans, ultrasound, X-ray, dialysis and the latest in patient care and trauma and diagnostic center staffed by specialists. The 150 bed Philhealth department will be the first in the region that will cater to the needs of the disadvantaged and marginalized sector of our society. This is consistent with the principle of the founders on the preferential option for the poor. The schools have grown so fast that it has now the 2nd largest enrollment in the tertiary level in the region. The dynamism Dr. and Mrs. Guzman sparked and the generosity he and his wife generated was made more manifest when he extended scholarship and financial support to 32% of his school’s student population composed mostly of children of poor families. The school has provided assistance to the following special groups: student orphans, indigenous people, honor students, children of elementary and high school teachers, children of rebel returnees, members of the PNP and AFP, and other groups needing assistance.

== Programs and Courses ==
=== Academic Courses ===
- Bachelor of Laws
  - Master of Legal Science
- Bachelor of Science in Accountancy
- Bachelor of Science in Criminology
- Bachelor of Science in Social Work
- Bachelor of Science in Tourism
- Bachelor of Science in Business Administration
  - Major in International Business
  - Major in Entrepreneurship
  - with international practicum in Singapore
- Bachelor of Science in Hospitality Industry Management
  - with international practicum in Singapore
- Bachelor of Science in Information Technology
- Bachelor of Science in Customs Administration
- Bachelor of Science in Secondary Education
  - Major in English
- Computer Programming
- Caregiving(Six Months) under TESDA
- K-12 Business High School

=== Academic programs ===
- Academic Tracking Program
- Course Audit Program
- Education on Wheels Program
- Enrichment and Remediation Clinics
- Language Proficiency Program
- Rubrics Development Program
- Nihonngo Class

=== Law Program ===
1. Degree programs offered: either Bachelor of Laws alone or combined Bachelor of Laws and Master of Legal Science.
2. Degrees conferred by Aquinas University and San Beda College Graduate School of Law
3. Classes held at ISAP 5.45 to 8.45 Mon to Fri, on Sat: 8 am to 5 pm.
4. Faculty include:

- Dean Leticia Aquino
- Prosecutor Erwin Geron
- Judge Antonio Laggui
- Judge Jet Aquino
- Judge Edmar Castillo
- Labor Arbiter Lourdes Barricaua
- Atty. Viva Guzman
- Atty. Cristina Guzman-Natividad
- Fr. Ranhilio Aquino.
