= Nagao Ariga =

Japanese jurist and historian (1860–1921)

- 有賀長雄
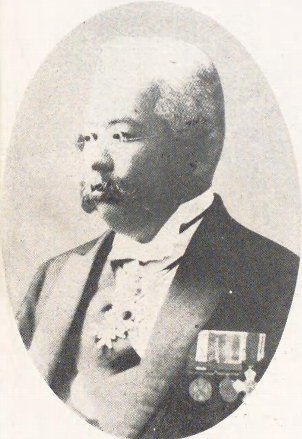

Judge

Personal details
- Born: 13 November 1860
- Died: 17 June 1921 (aged 60)

Nagao Ariga also spelled Nagao Aruga (有賀 長雄; 13 November 1860 – 17 June 1921) was a Japanese legal expert during the Meiji period. In addition to law, he also studied sociology at Tokyo Imperial University. During the Sino-Japanese war, he advised Field-Marshal Ōyama Iwao on issues of international law. In 1913 he accepted the invitation by Yuan Shikai, to prepare a draft constitution for the new Chinese republic, together with Ushikichi Nakae (中江 丑吉). Ariga doubted that China was ready to implement a liberal democracy and recommended a balance between monarchy and republic.

Ariga also worked as a translator.

== Works (partial list) ==
- La Chine Et La Grande Guerre Europeenne Au Point de Vue Du Droit International D'Apres Les Documents Officiels Du Gouvernement Chinois
- La guerre sino-japonaise au point de vue du droit international
- La Guerre Russo-Japoinaise 1904-1905
- Kinji gaikōshi (History of foreign relations in modern times) (1898)
