= Airsickness =

Motion sickness induced by air travel

- Specialty: Neurology

Airsickness is a specific form of motion sickness which is induced by air travel and is considered a normal response in healthy individuals. Airsickness occurs when the central nervous system receives conflicting messages from the body (including the inner ear, eyes and muscles) affecting balance and equilibrium. Whereas commercial airline passengers may simply feel poorly, the effect of airsickness on military aircrew may lead to a decrement in performance and adversely affect the mission.

The inner ear is particularly important in the maintenance of balance and equilibrium because it contains sensors for both angular (rotational) and linear motion. Airsickness is usually a combination of spatial disorientation, nausea and vomiting.

== Signs and symptoms ==
Common symptoms of airsickness include:

Nausea, vomiting, vertigo, loss of appetite, cold sweating, skin pallor, difficulty concentrating, confusion, drowsiness, headache, and increased fatigue. Severe airsickness may cause a person to become completely incapacitated.

== Risk factors ==
The following factors increase some people's susceptibility to airsickness:

- Fatigue, stress and anxiety are some factors that can increase susceptibility to motion sickness of any type.
- The use of alcohol, drugs, and medications may also contribute to airsickness.
- Additionally, airsickness is more common in women (especially during menstruation or pregnancy), young children, and individuals prone to other types of motion sickness.
- Although airsickness is uncommon among experienced pilots, it does occur with some frequency in student pilots.

== Prevention ==
Travelers who are susceptible to motion sickness can minimize symptoms by:

- Choosing a window seat with a view of the Earth's surface or of lower clouds, such that motion can be detected and visually observed.
- Choosing seats with the smoothest ride in regards to pitch (the seats over the wings in an airplane). This may not be sufficient for sensitive individuals who need to see ground movement.
- Sitting facing forward while focusing on distant objects rather than trying to read or look at something inside the airplane.

== Treatment ==
=== Medication ===
Medications that may alleviate the symptoms of airsickness include:

- meclizine
- dimenhydrinate
- diphenhydramine
- scopolamine (available in both patch and oral form).

Pilots who are susceptible to airsickness are usually advised not to take anti-motion sickness medications (prescription or over-the-counter). These medications can make one drowsy or affect brain functions in other ways.

=== Non-medication based ===
A method to increase pilot resistance to airsickness consists of repetitive exposure to the flying conditions that initially resulted in airsickness. In other words, repeated exposure to the flight environment decreases an individual's susceptibility to subsequent airsickness. The US Air Force and US Navy have an Air Sickness Management Program and use a device called a Barany chair to desensitize trainees over 3 days. This combined with progressive relaxation (diaphragmatic breathing and muscle tensing) yields a high success rate. The Italian Air Force also uses a similar spinning chair and psychologic relaxation techniques which yields an 82% long-term success rate, over a 10-day training period.

Several devices have been introduced that are intended to reduce motion sickness through stimulation of various body parts (usually the wrist).

=== Alternative medicine ===
Alternative treatments include ginger and acupuncture, with variable effectiveness.

== See also ==
- Acclimatization
- Airsickness bag
- Motion sickness
- Space adaptation syndrome
