= Rudy Arnold =

American photographer (1902–1966)

Rudy Arnold (1902–1966) was an American photographer who specialized in aviation photography.

== Photography ==
Arnold began his career working as a photographer for the New York American. In the 1920s he quit the newspaper business to focus on aviation photography. He initially set up business at Curtiss Field in Long Island. He later moved to Floyd Bennett Field in Brooklyn, New York which became an important stopping point in transatlantic aviation in the 1930s and 1940s. The airport was unsuccessful as a commercial operation and became the home of many record breaking flights in the "Golden Era of Aviation". Arnold captured photos many of the historical aircraft and pilots of this time including Charles Lindbergh and Amelia Earhart. He captured the only photograph of the start of Douglas Corrigan's "accidental" transatlantic flight.

Arnold's collection of photographs is currently held by the Smithsonian's Air and Space Museum.
