= Internetowy System Aktów Prawnych =

Database of laws/regulations of Poland

- Screenshot
- Romanized name: Internet System of Legal Acts
- Available in: Polish
- Founded: 25 November 1974
- Headquarters: {{{location_country}}}
- Owner: Sejm
- Services: Government database
- Website: isap.sejm.gov.pl

The Internetowy System Aktów Prawnych (lit. 'Internet System of Legal Acts' in Polish), abbreviated as ISAP, is a database with information about the legislation in force in Poland, which is part of the oldest and one of the most famous Polish legal information systems, and is publicly available on the website of the Sejm of the Republic of Poland.
