= Air-to-air photography =

Photographing aircraft from another aircraft

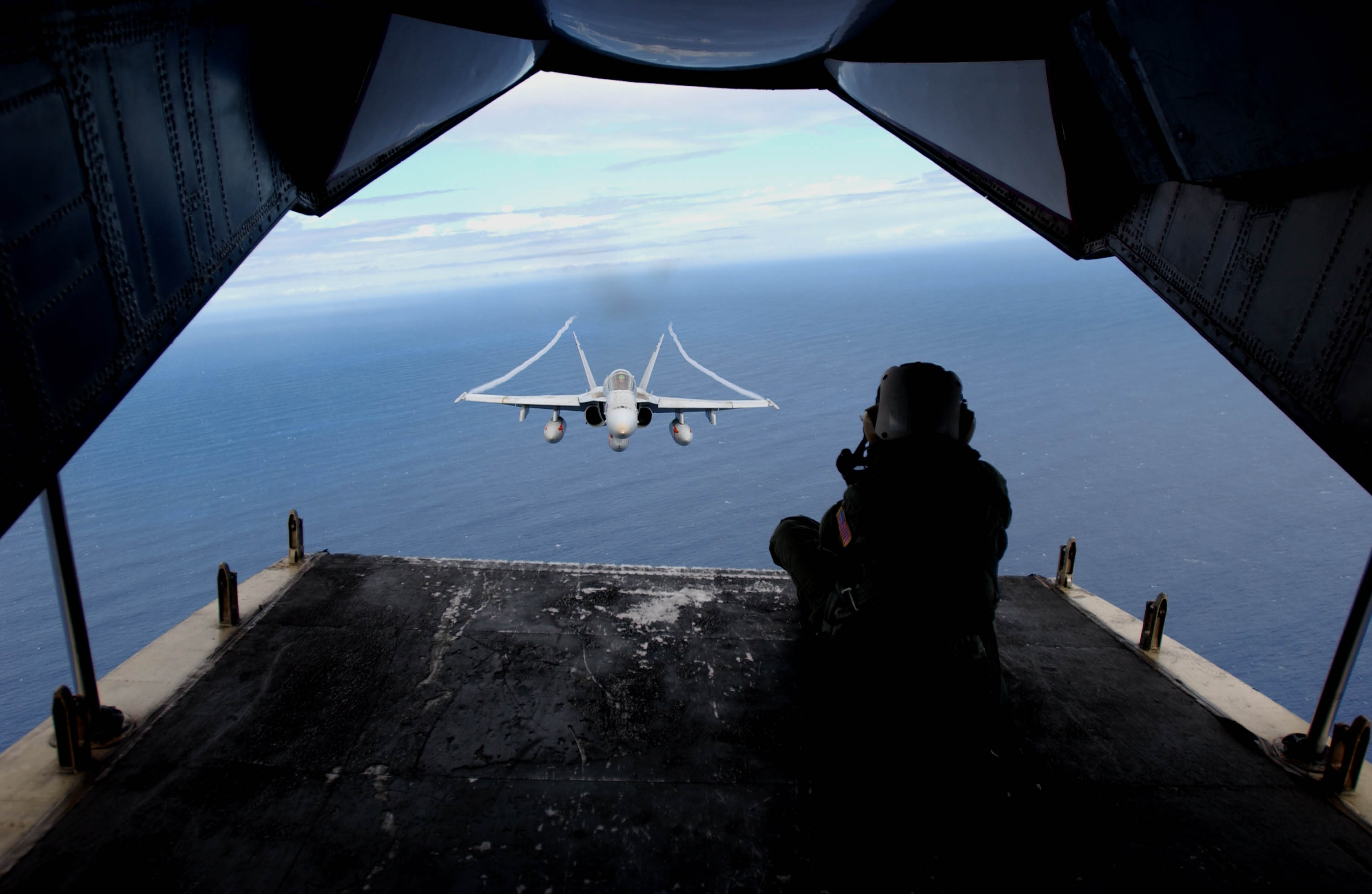
A U.S. Navy Photographers Mate photographing an F/A-18 Hornet from the cargo ramp of a C-2 Greyhound.

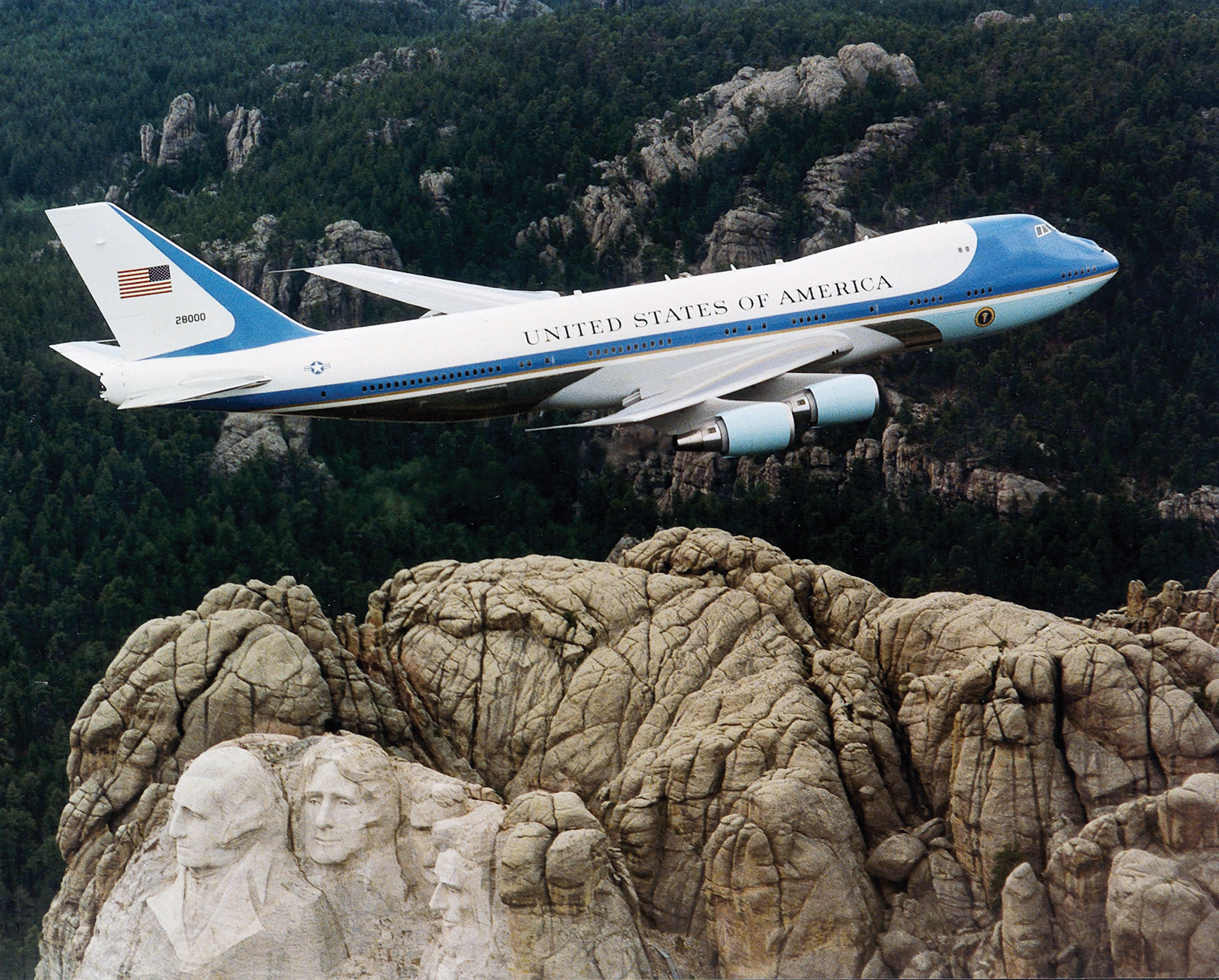
An air-to-air photograph of Air Force One over Mount Rushmore

Air-to-air photography is the art of photographing aircraft in the air, by using another aircraft as a photo platform. It is especially popular among military aircraft photographers and aerobatic pilots flying at air shows.

== Technique ==
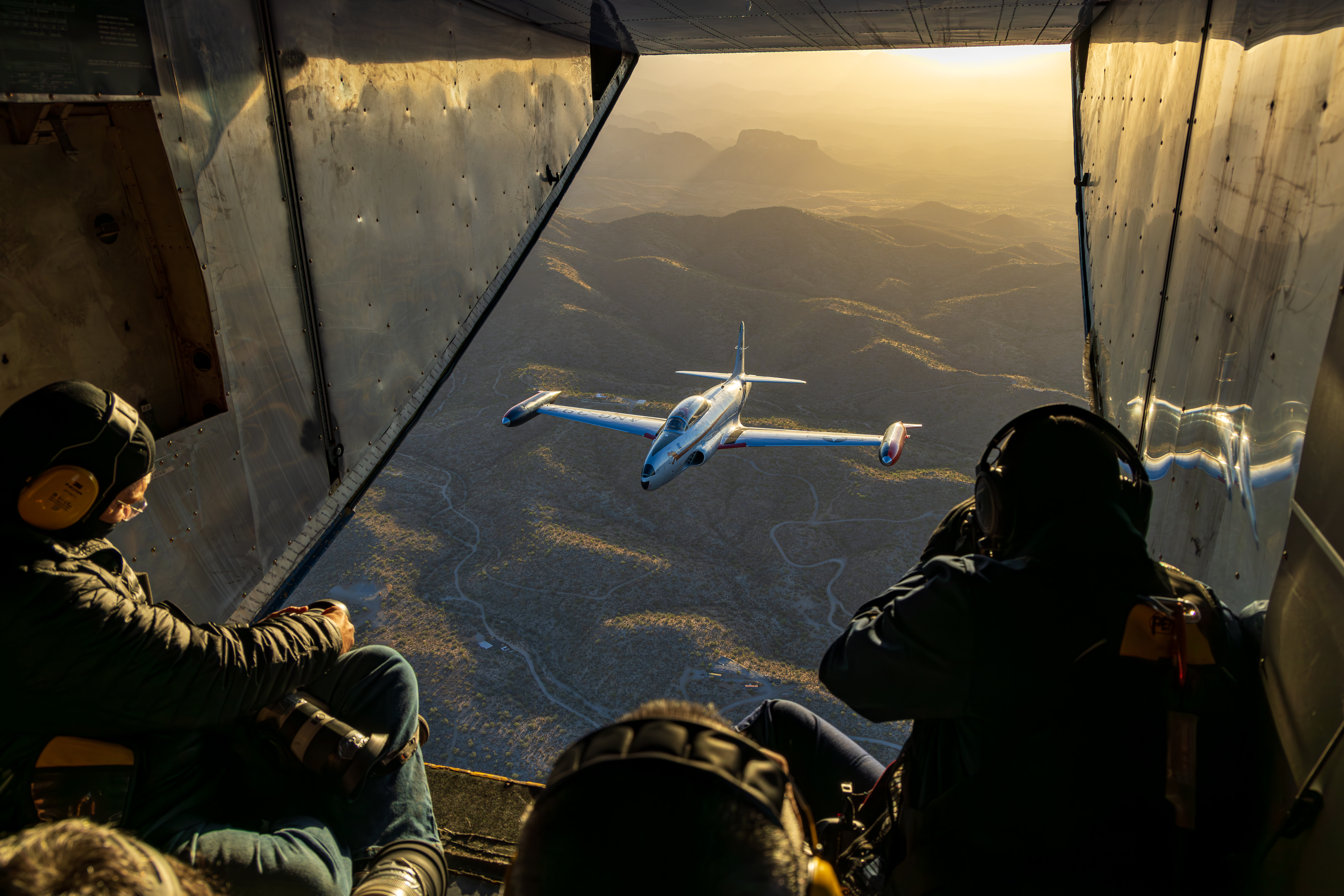
Photographers working from the open rear ramp of a Short C-23 Sherpa camera ship, with the subject aircraft formating below

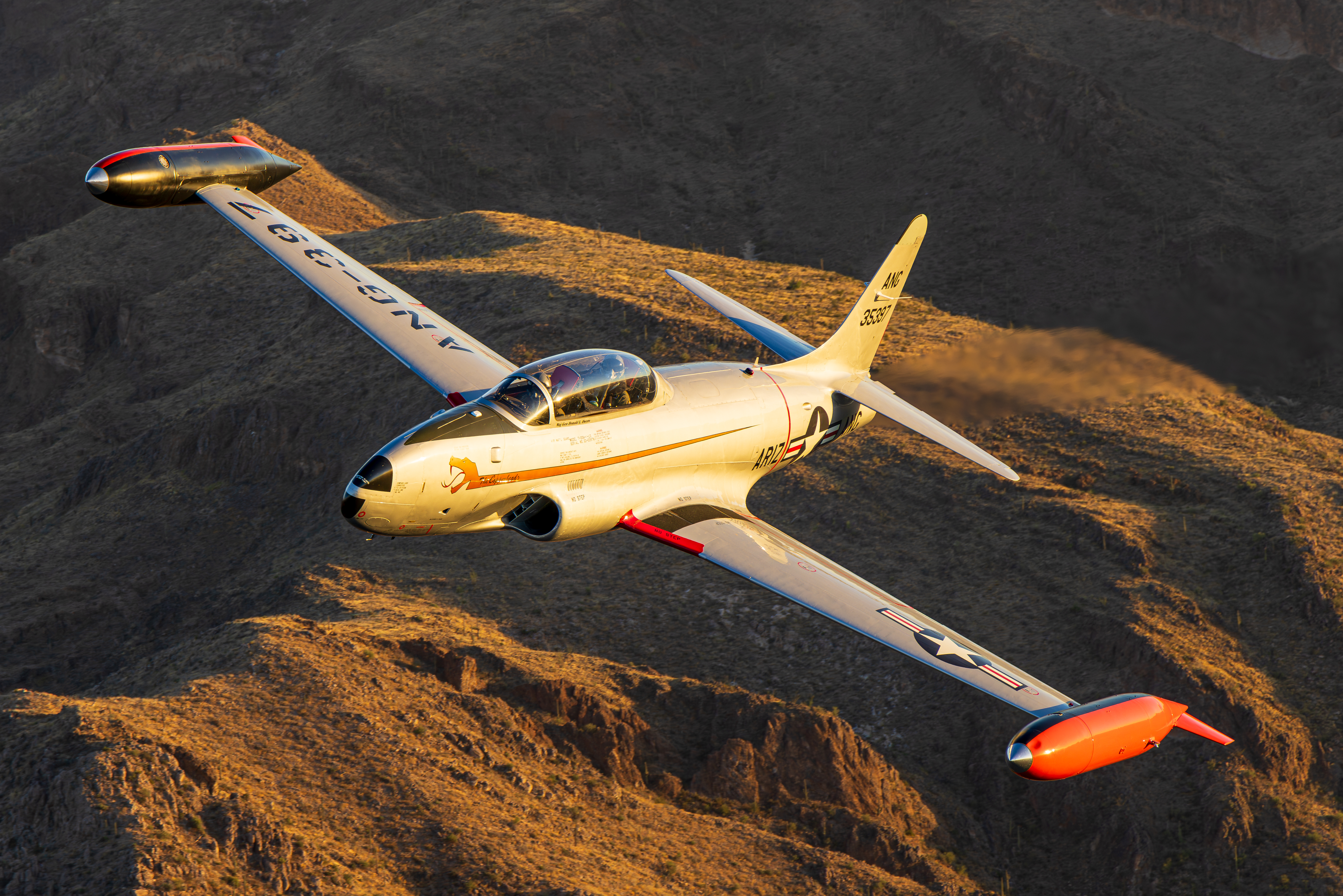
The resulting photograph: a Canadair CT-133 Silver Star over the Superstition Mountains, Arizona

An air-to-air sortie seen from the camera ship, and the photograph it produced, twelve minutes apart

Air-to-air photography requires special skills and experience, as the photo platform and target aircraft often fly low level while under moderate to high G-forces. Looking through his camera, the photographer usually sits looking sideways while the aircraft manoeuvres through the sky, often resulting in airsickness and making air-to-air photography even more challenging.

The subject aircraft is photographed while both aircraft are in flight, often holding formation. This allows the photographer to position the subject in specific locations and angles to get the most desirable shot. Some things that must be considered to achieve best results are lighting and background. Proper lighting is achieved through correct placement of the aircraft relative to the sun, and is accomplished flying only at certain times of the day and/or by flying at a heading that lines the Sun up on the subject aircraft properly. The background can highlight or distract from the subject and must be carefully considered when taking shots.

== Applications ==
Air-to-air photography can be used for a variety of purposes, including commercial use and advertising. During World War II, air-to-air photographs were used in training members of the armed forces in aircraft recognition in publications such as the British journal Aircraft Recognition.

== Notable photographers ==
Notable air-to-air photographers include Mariusz Adamski and Katsuhiko Tokunaga.

== See also ==
- Aerial photography
- Formation flying
- Golden hour (photography)
- Panning (camera)
- Shutter speed
