= Nobuo Ariga =

Japanese singer-songwriter (1964–2023)

- Born: 14 October 1964; Tokyo, Japan
- Died: 27 February 2023 (aged 58); Tokyo, Japan
- Other names: Hiroo Ariga

Nobuo Ariga (Japanese: 有賀 啓雄; 14 October 1964 – 27 February 2023), also known as Hiroo Ariga (Japanese: 有賀 啓夫) in his early years of career, was a Japanese singer-songwriter, bassist, arranger and record producer.

== Life and career ==
Born in Tokyo, while studying at the Nihon University College of Art, Ariga co-founded the band VIZION, in which he performed as a bassist. After the band disbanded, he was part of the Shinji Harada's supporting band Crisis. In 1987, he made his debut as singer-songwriter, with the single "Ameiro no Boku to Kimi". He also worked as a producer and arranger, collaborating among others with Hiroko Yakushimaru, Fumiya Fujii, and Misato Watanabe. In 2020, after collaborating with the band as a producer since 2007, he joined the group SANISAI as a bassist.

Diagnosed with end-stage prostate cancer in the summer of 2022, Ariga died on 27 February 2023, at the age of 58.

== Discography ==
Albums

- 1987 - Sherbet (32FD-1059)
- 1992 - umbrella (FHCF-2005)
- 1993 - Innocent Days (FHCF-2101)
- 2006 - GOLDEN☆BEST (BVCK-38117)
