= Bleed (printing) =

Type of printing technique

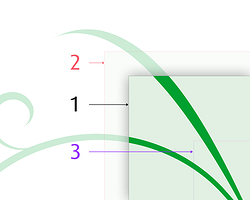
1. Trim; where the product will be cut.; 2. Bleed; the zone outside the trim area.; 3. Margin; the zone inside the trim area.

In printing, bleed is printing that goes beyond the edge of where the sheet will be trimmed. In other words, the bleed is the area to be trimmed off. The bleed is the part on the side of a document that gives the printer a small amount of space to account for natural movement of the paper during guillotining, and design inconsistencies. Artwork and background colors often extend into the bleed area. After trimming, the bleed ensures that no unprinted edges occur in the final trimmed document.

It is very difficult to print exactly to the edge of a sheet of paper; therefore, it is necessary to print a slightly larger area than is needed and then trim the paper down to the required finished size. Any content that is intended to extend to the edge of the paper must be extended beyond the trim line in order to produce bleed.

Bleeds in the imperial system generally are 1/8 of an inch from where the cut is to be made. Bleeds in the metric system generally are 2mm-5mm from where the cut is to be made, often varying by printing company. Some printers ask for specific sizes; most of these companies place the specific demands on their website or offer templates that are already set to their required bleed settings.

== Bleed information ==
Bleed information refers to elements outside the finished piece. Often a printer requires bleed information on pieces that have bleed to allow for "printer bounce" when cutting a job down to size. Failing to provide bleed information and crop marks can result in finished pieces showing a thin area of white on the edge. Bleed marks are fine (hairline) rules in the corners of the page that define the amount of extra area to image outside the defined page size.

A standard bleed is about one-eighth of an inch or very similar 3 mm. For large-format posters an extra 0.25 inches (6.35mm) is usually allowed on all sides.

Die-cuts sometimes require a 1/4" bleed from where the page is intended to be cut; this is because of the possible movement of the paper during the die-cut procedure.

Bleed is most commonly set up in artwork for print using professional graphic design software.

== Full bleed ==
Full bleed is printing from one edge of the paper to the other without the standard borders by which most personal printers are limited. This is useful for printing brochures, posters, and other marketing materials. Often the paper is trimmed after printing to ensure the ink runs fully to the edge and does not stop short of it.

== See also ==
- Overscan, analogous concept in video
- Cropping (image)
