= Katsuhiko Ariga =

Japanese chemist

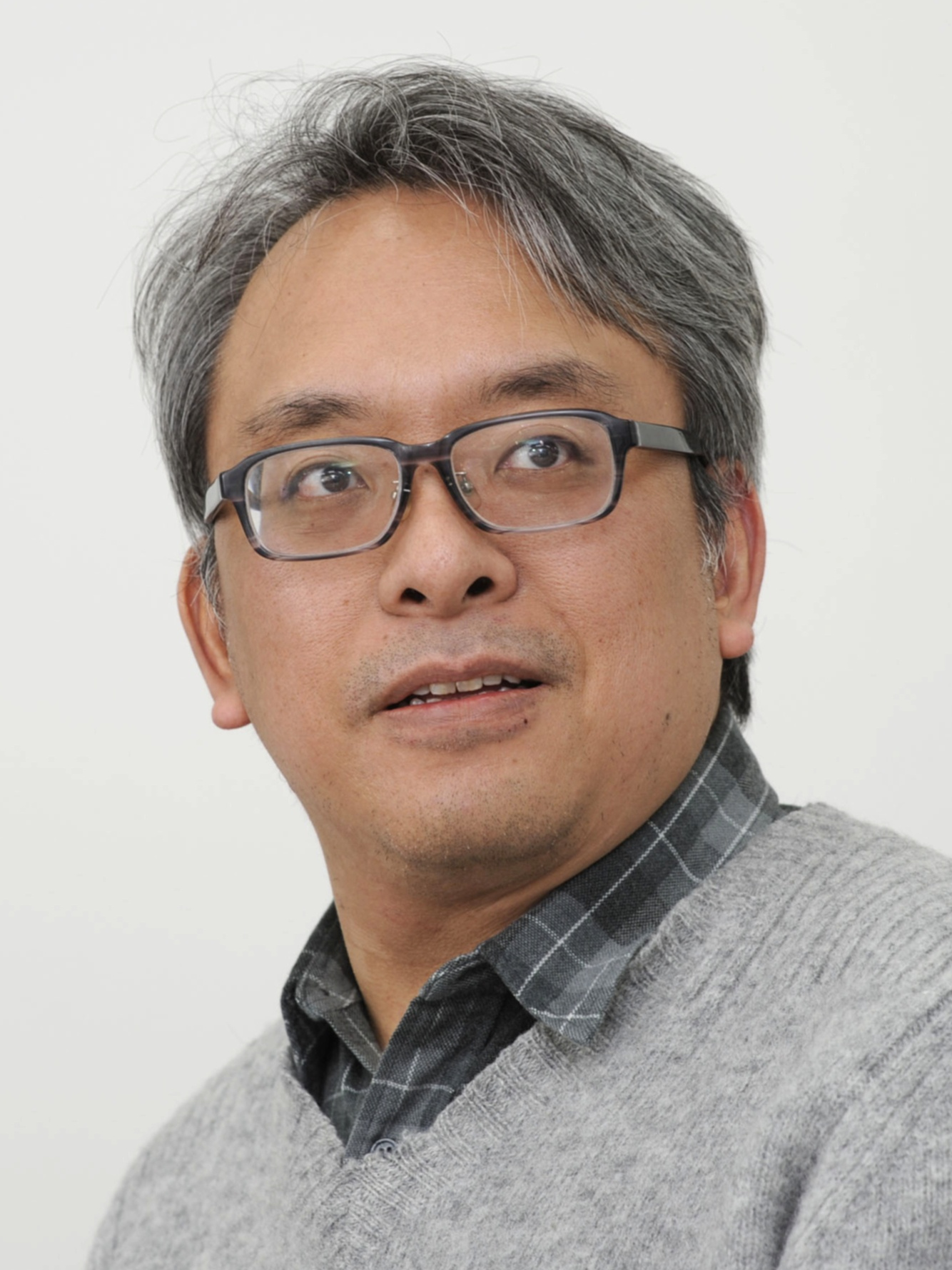
- Born: Katsuhiko Ariga; 1962 (age 63–64)
- Education: Tokyo Institute of Technology
- Scientific career
- Fields: Supramolecular chemistry Nanotechnology; Self-assembly
- Workplaces: NIMS (2004–); University of Tokyo; Tokyo Institute of Technology (1987–1992); University of Texas at Austin (1990–1992); NAIST
- Thesis: (1990)

Katsuhiko Ariga (有賀克彦, Ariga Katsuhiko; born 1962) is a Japanese chemist specializing in nanotechnology and self-assembly. He was educated at the Tokyo Institute of Technology, where he defended his PhD in 1990 and later worked as assistant professor. Since 2004 he carries out research at the National Institute for Materials Science, and teaches at the University of Tokyo, where he is a full professor. Ariga is a Fellow of the Royal Society of Chemistry (2013) and an editor of the journal Science and Technology of Advanced Materials.

== Selected publications ==
According to the Web of Science Ariga published five articles with more than 700 citations each:

- Lvov, Yuri; Ariga, Katsuhiko; Ichinose, Izumi; Kunitake, Toyoki (1995). "Assembly of Multicomponent Protein Films by Means of Electrostatic Layer-by-Layer Adsorption". Journal of the American Chemical Society. 117 (22): 6117–6123. doi:10.1021/ja00127a026.
- Ariga, Katsuhiko; Hill, Jonathan P.; Ji, Qingmin (2007). "Layer-by-layer assembly as a versatile bottom-up nanofabrication technique for exploratory research and realistic application". Physical Chemistry Chemical Physics. 9 (19): 2319–40. Bibcode:2007PCCP....9.2319A. doi:10.1039/b700410a. PMID 17492095.
- Ariga, Katsuhiko; Vinu, Ajayan; Yamauchi, Yusuke; Ji, Qingmin; Hill, Jonathan P. (2012). "Nanoarchitectonics for Mesoporous Materials". Bulletin of the Chemical Society of Japan. 85: 1–32. doi:10.1246/bcsj.20110162.
- Ariga, Katsuhiko; Yamauchi, Yusuke; Rydzek, Gaulthier; Ji, Qingmin; Yonamine, Yusuke; Wu, Kevin C.-W.; Hill, Jonathan P. (2014). "Layer-by-layer Nanoarchitectonics: Invention, Innovation, and Evolution". Chemistry Letters. 43: 36–68. doi:10.1246/cl.130987.
- Ariga, Katsuhiko; Hill, Jonathan P.; Lee, Michael V.; Vinu, Ajayan; Charvet, Richard; Acharya, Somobrata (2008). "Challenges and breakthroughs in recent research on self-assembly". Science and Technology of Advanced Materials. 9 (1) 014109. doi:10.1088/1468-6996/9/1/014109. PMC 5099804. PMID 27877935.
