= Katsuhiko Tokunaga =

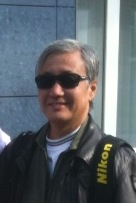
Katsuhiko Tokunaga in 2010

Katsuhiko "Katsu" Tokunaga (徳永克彦, tokunaga katsuhiko) (born January 13, 1957) is a Japanese military aviation photographer, specializing in air-to-air photography. He works for a large number of aircraft manufacturers including Dassault, Embraer, Airbus Military/Eurofighter, Korean Aerospace Industries, Lockheed Martin, Mikoyan, Pilatus Aircraft, Saab and Sukhoi.

Tokunaga started his career in the backseat of a United States Air Force T-33A Shooting Star in 1978. To date he has flown between 50 and 60 fast jets in some 50 countries, logging 1400 flight hours. He has also flown with and photographed many aerobatic teams from around the world, including that of the Royal Air Force (the Red Arrows), the Japan Air Self-Defense Force (Blue Impulse), the Canadian Forces (the Snowbirds), the Breitling Jet Team, Croatian Air Force and Air Defence's Wings of Storm, the Chilean Air Force's Halcones, the French Air Force's Patrouille de France, the Italian Air Force's Frecce Tricolori, the Portuguese Air Force's Asas de Portugal, the Republic of Singapore Air Force's RSAF Black Knights, the Slovak Air Force's Biele Albatrosy, the Spanish Air Force's Patrulla Aguila, the Swedish Air Force's Team 60, the Swiss Air Force's Patrouille Suisse and PC-7 Team, as well as the US Air Force's Thunderbirds and the US Navy's Blue Angels, the Polish Air Force's White-Red Sparks and the Yugoslav Air Force's Leteće zvezde.

He also published many books including 'Smoke Trails: The last of the F-4 Phantoms' (in cooperation with Jamie Hunter), 'Super Blue' and 'Top Teams'.
