= List of colleges and universities in Metro Manila =

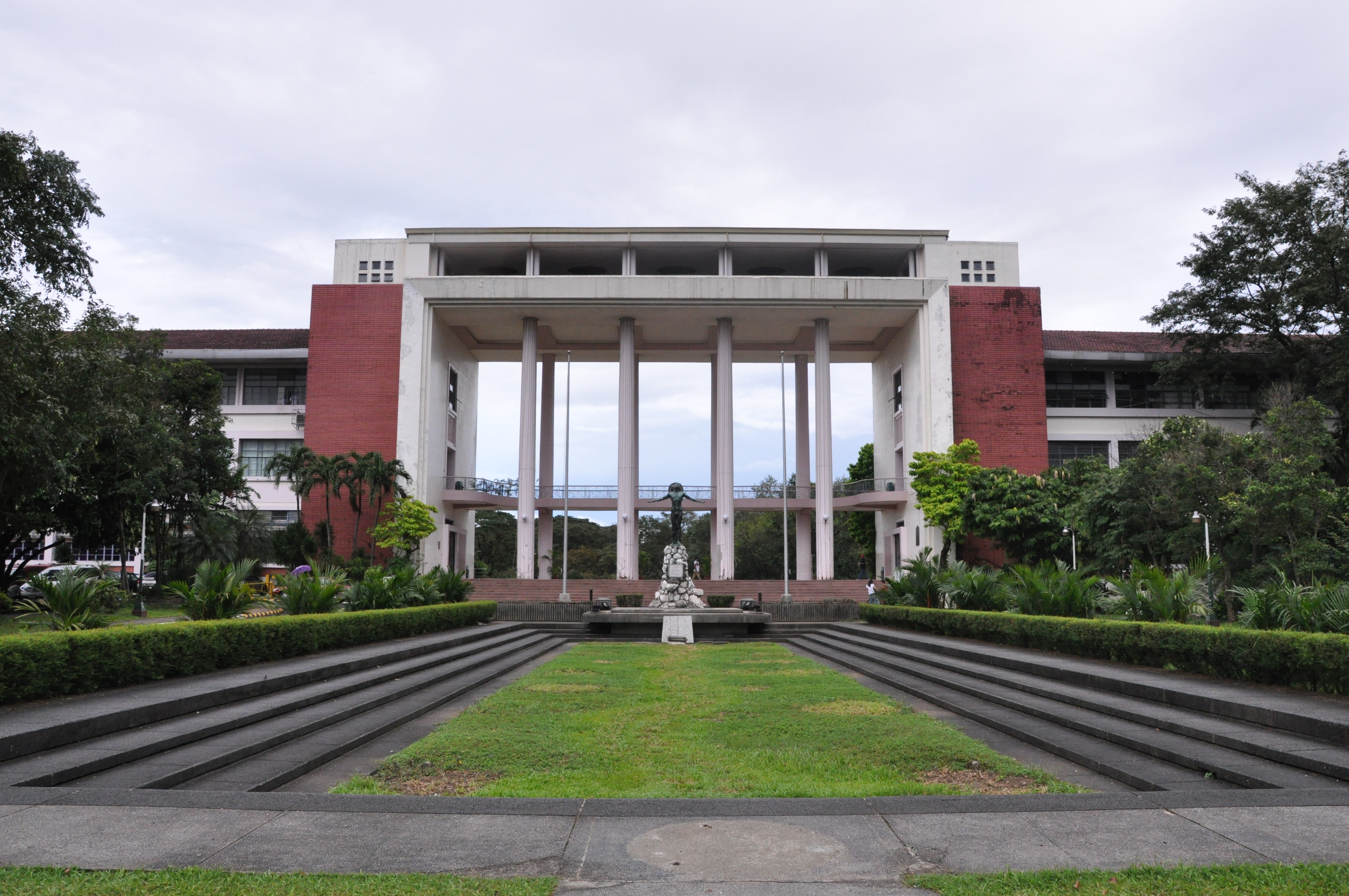
University of the Philippines Diliman (UPD)

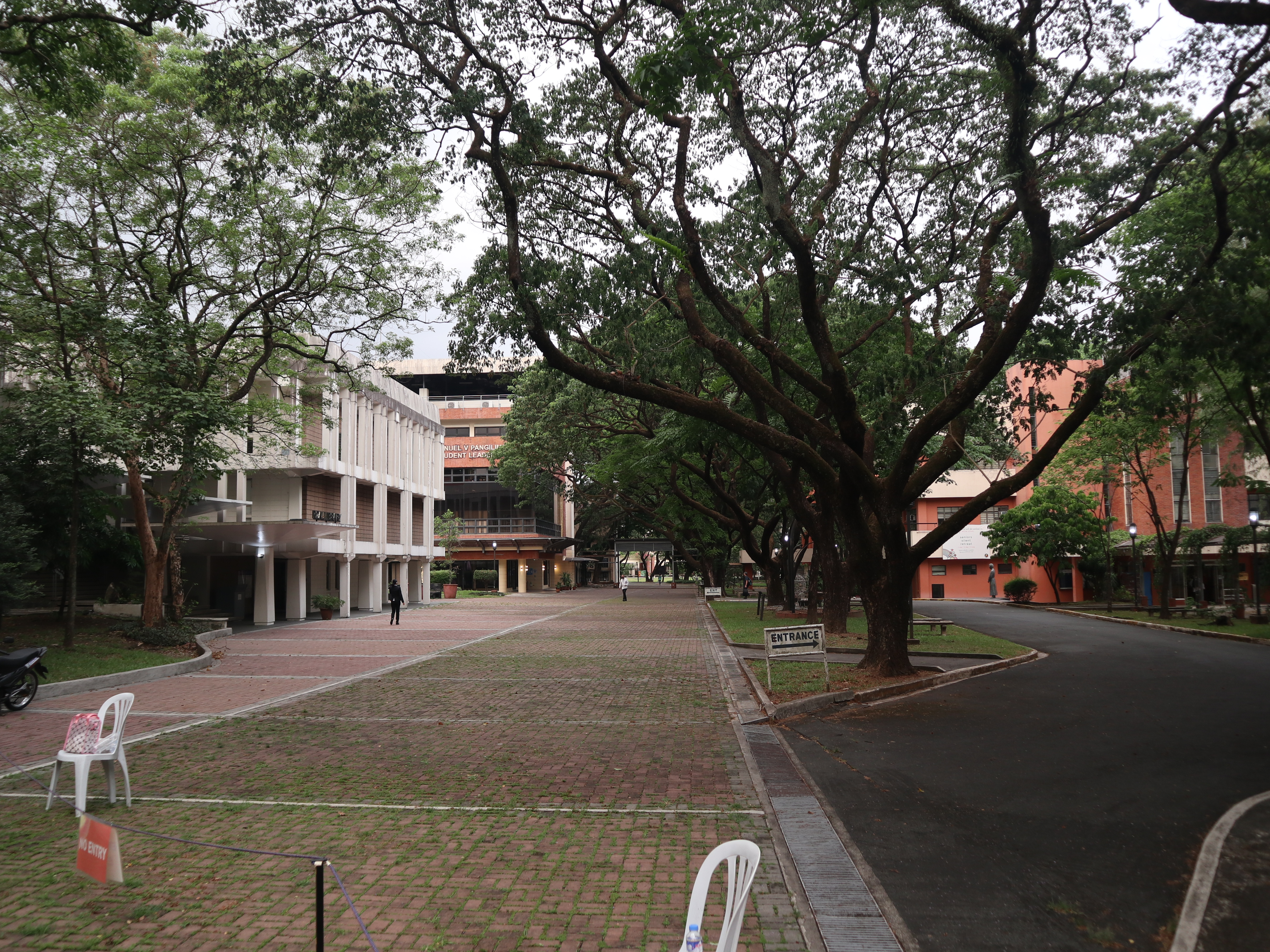
Ateneo De Manila University (ADMU)

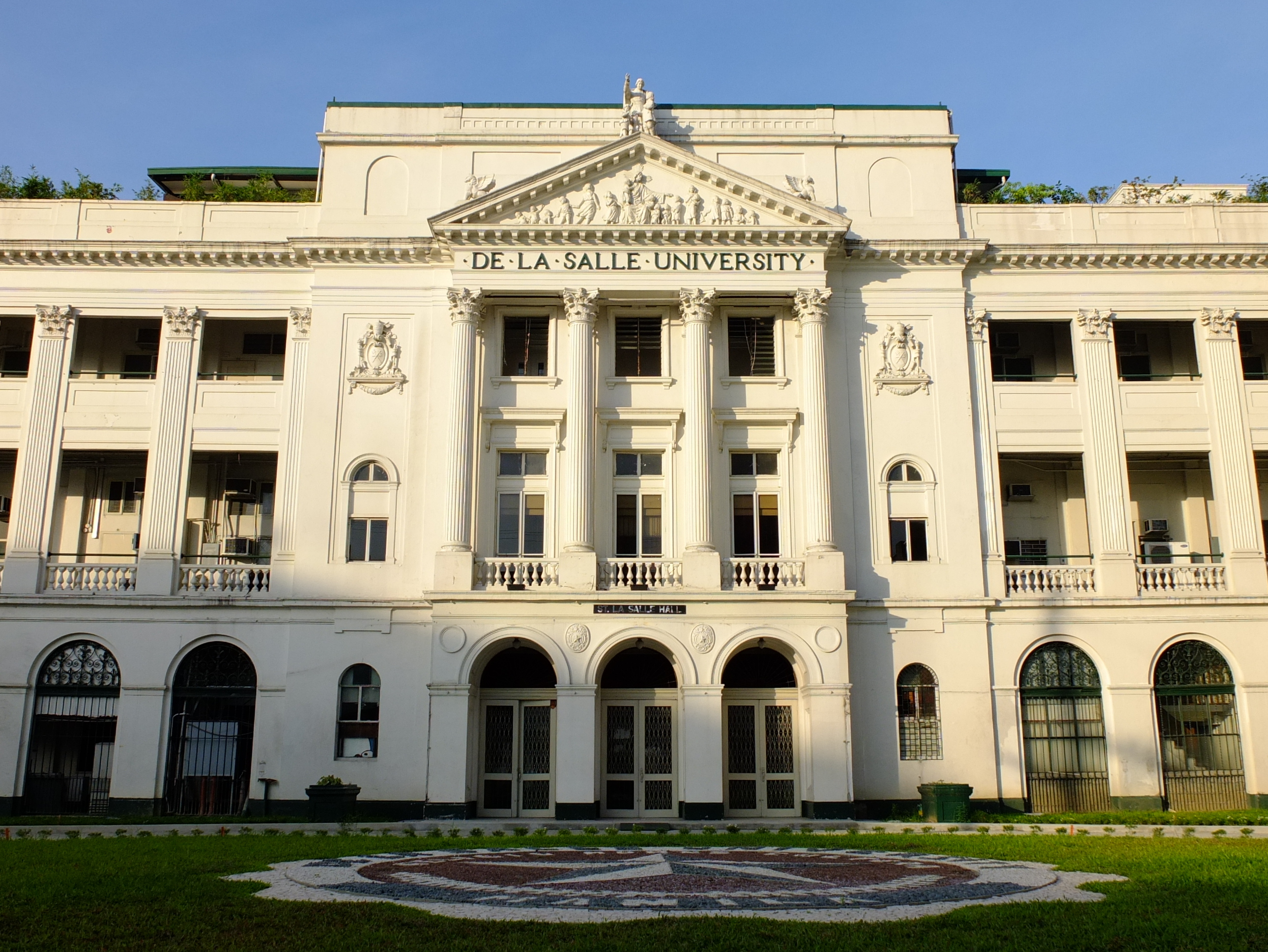
De La Salle University (DLSU)

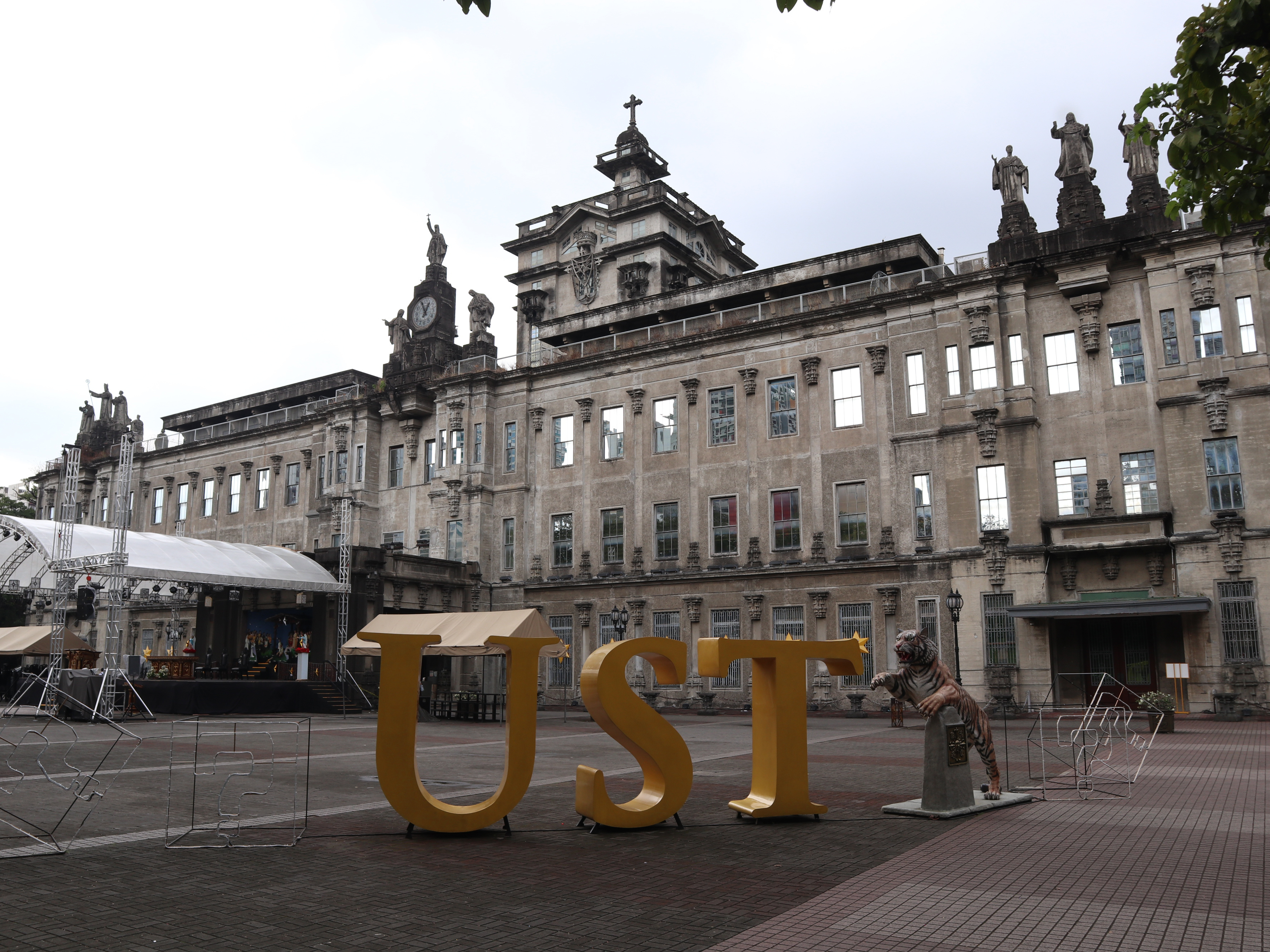
University of Santo Tomas (UST)

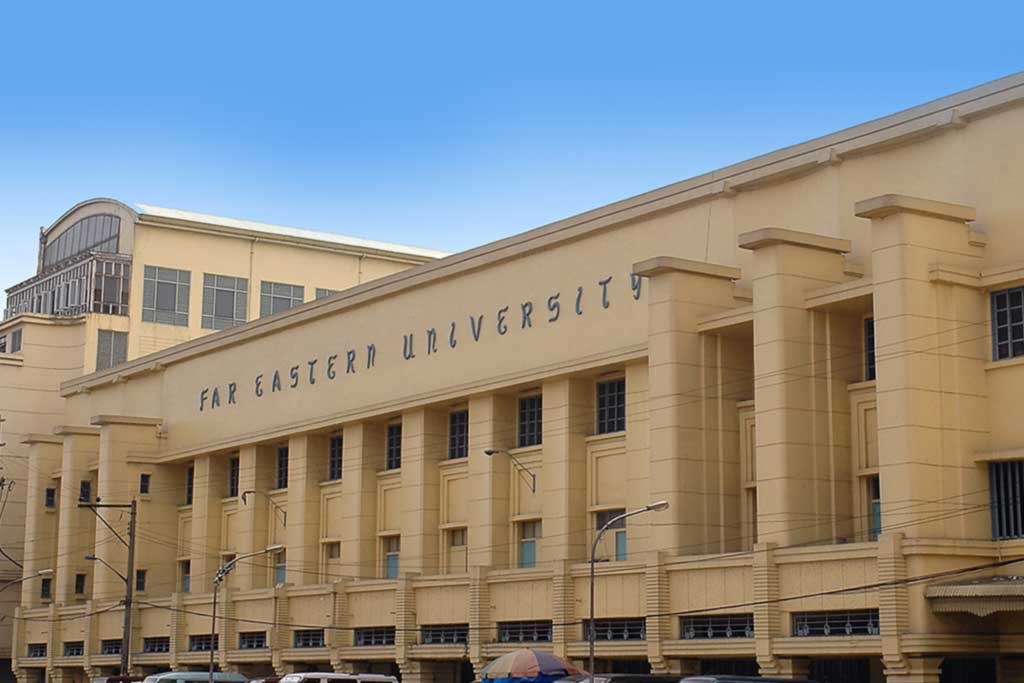
Far Eastern University (FEU)

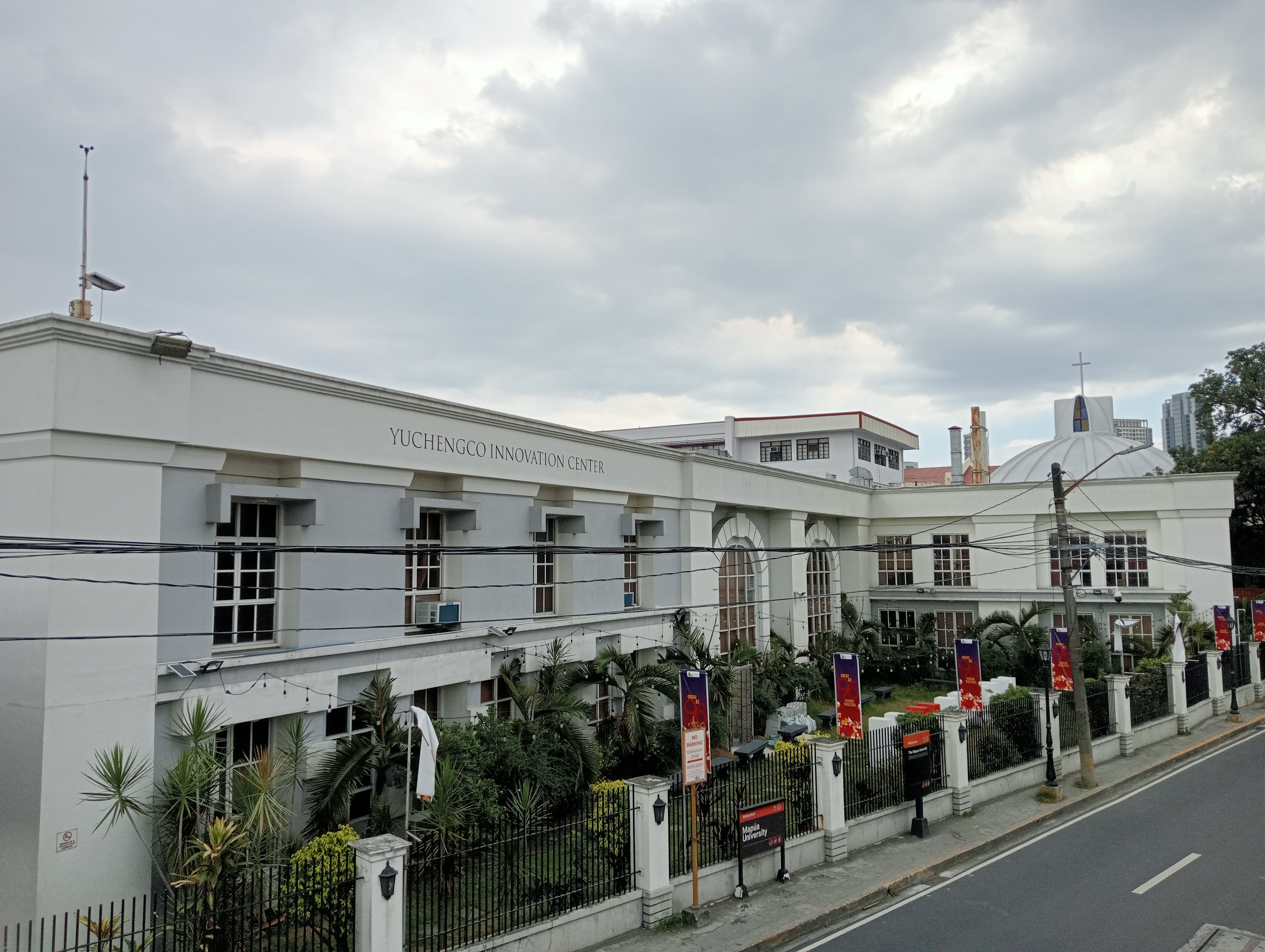
Mapua University

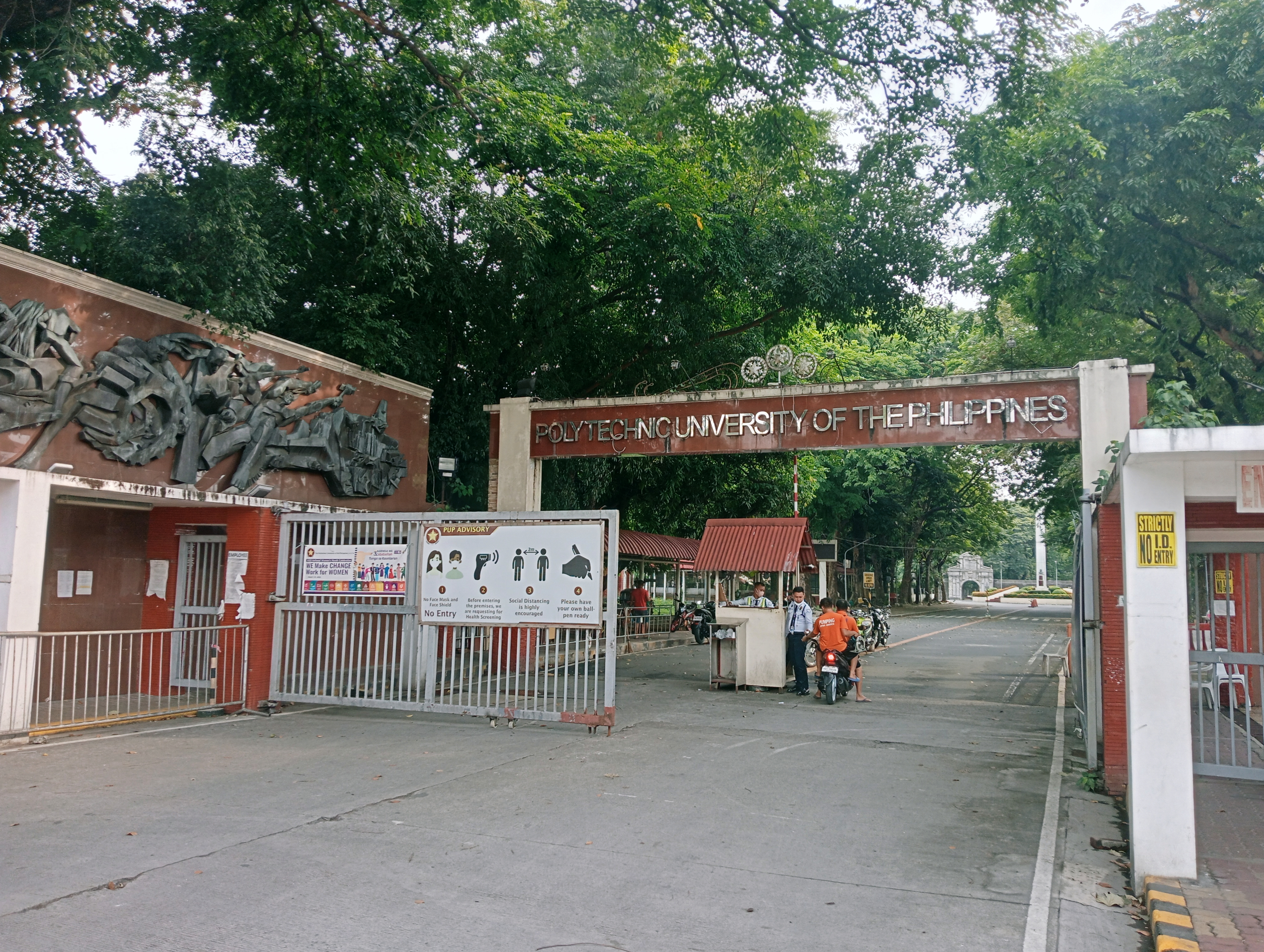
Polytechnic University of the Philippines (PUP)

This is a partial list of colleges and universities in Metro Manila, Philippines.

== State universities and local colleges ==
- City of Malabon University
- City University of Pasay
- Dr. Filemon C. Aguilar Memorial College of Las Piñas
- Colegio de Muntinlupa
- Eulogio "Amang" Rodriguez Institute of Science and Technology
- Mandaluyong City College of Science and Technology
- Marikina Polytechnic College
- National Aviation Academy of the Philippines
- National Defense College of the Philippines
- Navotas Polytechnic College
- Pamantasan ng Lungsod ng Marikina
- Pamantasan ng Lungsod ng Maynila
- Pamantasan ng Lungsod ng Muntinlupa
- Pamantasan ng Lungsod ng Pasig
- Pamantasan ng Lungsod ng Valenzuela
- Parañaque City College of Science and Technology
- Pateros Technological College
- Philippine Normal University
- Philippine Public Safety College
- Polytechnic University of the Philippines Manila (Main Campus)
  - Polytechnic University of the Philippines Parañaque
  - Polytechnic University of the Philippines Quezon City
  - Polytechnic University of the Philippines San Juan
  - Polytechnic University of the Philippines Taguig
- Quezon City University
  - Quezon City University - Batasan Hills
  - Quezon City University - San Bartolome
  - Quezon City University - San Francisco
- Rizal Technological University Mandaluyong (Main Campus)
  - Rizal Technological University (Pasig Campus)
- Taguig City University
- Technological University of the Philippines Manila (Main Campus)
  - Technological University of the Philippines (Taguig Campus)
- Universidad de Manila
- University of the Philippines
  - University of the Philippines Diliman
  - University of the Philippines Manila
- University of Caloocan City (Congressional Campus)
- University of Makati
- Valenzuela City Polytechnic College

== Private universities and colleges ==
=== A ===
- ABE International Business College
  - ABE International Business College Caloocan
  - ABE International Business College Cubao
  - ABE International Business College Fairview
  - ABE International Business College Las Piñas
  - ABE International Business College Makati
  - ABE International Business College Manila
  - ABE International Business College Taft
- Access Computer College
  - Access Computer College Manila
  - Access Computer College Cubao
  - Access Computer College Camarin
  - Access Computer College Lagro
  - Access Computer College Marikina
  - Access Computer College Monumento
  - Access Computer College Pasig
  - Access Computer College Zabarte
- Adamson University
- Air Link International Aviation College
- ACLC Commonwealth
- AMA Computer University
- UST Angelicum College
- Arellano University
  - Arellano University, Malabon
  - Arellano University, Mandaluyong
  - Arellano University, Pasay
  - Arellano University, Pasig
- Asia Pacific College
- Asia School of Arts and Sciences
- Asian College Quezon City
- Asian Institute of Computer Studies
  - Asian Institute of Computer Studies Bicutan
  - Asian Institute of Computer Studies Caloocan
  - Asian Institute of Computer Studies Commonwealth
- Asian Institute for Distance Education
- Asian Institute of Journalism and Communication
- Asian Institute of Management
- Asian Institute of Maritime Studies
- Asian School of Hospitality Arts
- Asian Social Institute
- Asian Summit College
- Assumption College San Lorenzo
- Ateneo de Manila University

=== B ===
- Bestlink College of the Philippines
- Bernardo College

=== C ===
- CAP College Foundation
- Central Colleges of the Philippines
- Centro Escolar University
  - Centro Escolar Las Piñas
  - Centro Escolar University Makati
- Chiang Kai Shek College
- Chinese General Hospital Colleges
- CIIT College of Arts and Technology
- Colegio de San Juan de Letran
- Colegio de Santa Teresa de Avila – Novaliches, Quezon City
- College of Divine Wisdom
- College of the Holy Spirit Manila
- Concordia College (Manila)
- College of St. Catherine Quezon City
- College of Arts & Sciences of Asia & the Pacific

=== D ===
- Datamex Institute of Computer Technology
- Dee Hwa Liong College Foundation
- De La Salle University
  - DLSU-Manila
  - DLSU-Makati
  - DLSU-Rufino (BGC)
  - De La Salle Araneta University
  - De La Salle–College of Saint Benilde
- De Ocampo Memorial College
- Don Bosco Technical College
- DLS–STI College
- Dr. Filemon C. Aguilar Memorial College of Las Piñas
- Dr. Carlos S. Lanting College (Quezon City)
- Dominican College (San Juan)

=== E ===
- Emmanuel John Institute of Science & Technology (EJIST)
- Emilio Aguinaldo College
- Enderun Colleges
- Entrepreneurs School of Asia (formerly Thames International School)

=== F ===
- Far Eastern University
  - Far Eastern University – Makati
  - Far Eastern University – Nicanor Reyes Medical Foundation (FEU NRMF)
  - FEU Alabang
  - FEU Diliman
  - FEU Institute of Technology (FEU Tech)
  - FEU Roosevelt – Marikina
- FEATI University

=== G ===
- Gateways Institute of Science and Technology (GIST)
  - GIST Fairview
  - GIST Kalentong
- Global City Innovative College, Bonifacio Global City
- Grace Christian College
- Greenville College
- Greatways Technical Institute Makati
- Global Reciprocal Colleges Caloocan
- Governor Andres Pascual College
- Guzman College of Science and Technology

=== I ===
- Immaculada Concepcion College
- Immaculate Heart of Mary College, Inc. Quezon City
- Immaculate Heart of Mary College-Parañaque
- Imus Computer College (ICC)
  - Imus Computer College (Alabang)
- Informatics International College
  - Informatics College Manila
  - Informatics Blarghy Blargh College
- iAcademy
- Infotech College of Arts and Sciences
- Integrated Innovations and Hospitality College, Inc. (IIH College)
- Interface Computer College (ICC)
  - ICC Manila
  - ICC Caloocan
- International Academy of Management and Economics
- International Baptist College (I.B.C.)
- International Electronics and Technical Institute Inc. (I.E.T.I.) (4 campuses in MM)

=== J ===
- Jose Rizal University
- Jesus Reigns Christian College

=== L ===
- La Conception College
- La Concordia College
- La Consolacion College Manila
- La Verdad Christian College
- Lacson College Pasay
- Lyceum of the Philippines University

=== M ===
- Manila Adventist College
- Manila Business College
- Manila Central University
- Manila Christian Computer Institute for the Deaf
- The Manila Times College
- Manila Tytana Colleges (formerly Manila Doctors College)
- Manuel L. Quezon University
- Mapúa University
  - Mapúa University - Makati
- Mary Chiles College of Nursing
- Mary Johnston College of Nursing
- MFI Technological Institute
- Meridian International Business, Arts & Technology College (MINT College)
- Medici di Makati College
- Metro Manila College
- Metropolitan Medical Center College of Arts, Science and Technology
- Miriam College

=== N ===
- National College of Business and Arts
  - NCBA - Cubao, Quezon City
  - NCBA - Fairview, Quezon City
- National Teachers College Manila
- National University (Philippines)
  - National University - Manila
  - NU - Mall of Asia
  - NU - Fairview
  - NU - Las Piñas
  - NU - Alabang
  - NU - East Ortigas
- New Era University, Quezon City

=== O ===
- Olivarez College
- Our Lady of Fatima University
  - OLFU-Quezon City
  - OLFU-Valenzuela City
- Our Lady of Guadalupe Colleges
- Our Lady of Lourdes Technological College
  - OLLTC-Novaliches, Quezon City
- Our Lady of Perpetual Succor College

=== P ===
- Pacific InterContinental College (PIC), Inc.
- Pasig Catholic College
- PATTS College of Aeronautics
- Perpetual Help College of Manila
- Philippine Christian University
- Philippine College of Criminology
- Philippine College of Health Sciences
- Philippine Cultural College
- Philippine Merchant Marine Academy
- Philippine Merchant Marine School
- Philippine Rehabilitation Institute
- Philippine School of Business Administration Manila
- Philippine Women's University
- Philsin College Foundation
- PMI Colleges (formerly Philippine Maritime Institute)
  - PMI Colleges Manila
  - PMI Colleges Quezon City

=== S ===
- St. Clare College of Caloocan
- St. Dominic Savio College
- Saint Francis of Assisi College
  - SFAC Las Piñas
  - SFAC Taguig
  - SFAC Muntinlupa
- St. James College of Quezon City
- Saint Joseph's College of Quezon City
- Saint Jude College - Dimasalang, Manila
- St. Louis College Valenzuela
- Saint Mary's College of Quezon City
- St. Paul University System
  - St. Paul University Manila
  - St. Paul University Quezon City
  - St. Paul College of Makati
  - St. Paul College of Parañaque
  - St. Paul College Pasig
- Saint Pedro Poveda College
- Saint Rita College (Manila)
- St. Rita College Parañaque
- St. Scholastica's College Manila
- San Beda University
  - San Beda University (Mendiola, Manila)
  - San Beda College-Alabang (Alabang Hills Village, Muntinlupa)
- San Juan de Dios Educational Foundation – Pasay
- San Sebastian College – Recoletos de Manila
- Santa Catalina College
- Santa Isabel College Manila
- Southeastern College
- Siena College of Quezon City
- STI College
  - STI College - Alabang
  - STI College - Caloocan
  - STI College - Cubao
  - STI College - Fairview
  - STI College - Global City
  - STI College - Las Pinas
  - STI College - Makati
  - STI College - Marikina
  - STI NAMEI
  - STI College - Novaliches
  - STI College - Parañaque
  - STI College - Pasay
  - STI College - Quezon Avenue
  - STI College - Recto
  - STI College - Shaw
  - STI College - Taft Avenue
- Southeast Asian College
- Southville International School and Colleges

=== T ===
- Technological Institute of the Philippines
  - Technological Institute of the Philippines - Manila
  - Technological Institute of the Philippines - Quezon City
- The One School
- Thames Business School
- Trace College Makati
- Treston International College Taguig
- Trinity University of Asia (formerly Trinity College of Quezon City)

=== U ===
- Unciano Paramedical Colleges Inc. – Guadalcanal, Santa Mesa, Manila
- Universal College
- University of Asia and the Pacific, Ortigas Center, Pasig
- University of Manila
- University of Perpetual Help System DALTA
- University of Santo Tomas
- University of the East
  - University of the East Caloocan
  - University of the East Ramon Magsaysay Memorial Medical Center

=== W ===
- Wesleyan College of Manila
- West Bay College
- World Citi Colleges
  - WCC Caloocan
  - WCC Quezon City

== See also ==
- List of universities and colleges in the Philippines (located in provinces in Luzon, Visayas, and Mindanao regions)
- Higher education in the Philippines
