= Manila Business College =

Private college in Manila, Philippines

- Motto: Bright Minds Deserve A Bright Future
- Type: Private
- Established: September 15, 2000
- Chairman: Dr. Thomas Chua
- Location: 1671-1689 Alvarez Street, Santa Cruz, Manila, Philippines. 14°36′44″N 120°59′03″E
- Colors: Royal Blue
- Website: www.mbc.edu.ph
- Location in Metro Manila Location in Luzon Location in the Philippines

Manila Business College is a private college located in Santa Cruz, Manila, Philippines. It was founded in 2000, and primarily focuses on business management and economics.

Manila Business College operates on a trimestral system and offers business courses such as Business Administration, Entrepreneurship, Information Management, Hospitality Industry Management, Real Estate Management, Accounting Technology, and Accountancy. It also offers special language training (ESL, TOEFL, IELTS, Chinese-Mandarin) and college preparatory courses for foreign students. It has formed partnerships with several universities in the Philippines and abroad (including U.S., U.K., China, and Australia) to develop specialized education programs and deliver degree programs in Business and Management.

== History ==
The Manila Business College Foundation was envisioned by Dr. Thomas Chua. He invited a group of Filipinos to help him organize it. They organized the Board of Trustees with him. Dr. Chua invited Dr. Pedro G. Villaflores, former chief, Higher Education Division of CHED, NCR and retired director of Region IV, Commission on Higher Education, to join the Manila Business College Foundation as its first president.

== Technical courses ==
These are registered programs accredited by TESDA:

- Bookkeeping
- Events Management Services

== Undergraduate studies ==
College of Business

- Bachelor of Science in Business Administration: The Bachelor of Science in Business Administration (BSBA) program aims to prepare graduates to become competitive managers and business entrepreneurs; assume positions of responsibility in financial institutions and other financing intermediaries; perform functions relating to financial, marketing, management, and other fields in decision-making in enterprises; become effective international and local account executives; and compete in global business management.
  - BSBA Major in Banking and Finance
  - BSBA Major in Economics
  - BSBA Major in Human Resource Development
  - BSBA Major in Management
  - BSBA Major in Marketing Management
- Bachelor of Science in Accountancy
- Bachelor of Science in Accounting Technology
- Bachelor of Science in Entrepreneurship
- Bachelor of Science in Hospitality Management
- Bachelor of Science in Information Management
- Bachelor of Science in Real Estate Management

== Academic partners ==
=== Local partners ===
- Cagayan State University
- Pangasinan State University
- Ramon Magsaysay Technological University
- Philippine Christian University
- Lyceum of the Philippines University

=== International partners ===
Students who wish to pursue a foreign degree will have the opportunity through the Riteway Professional Diploma in Business Administration (PDBA). Students will take a business course for their first year with core business subjects and then continue his or her studies at the partner institution abroad for the remaining years. Below are the partner institutions of the college:

- University of Central Lancashire, U.K.
- University of Teesside, U.K.
- Fort Hays State University, U.S.A.
- Central Queensland University, Australia
- University of the Sunshine Coast, Australia
- University of Southern Queensland, Australia
- Edith Cowan University, Australia
- University of New England, Australia
- Victoria University, Australia
- Charles Sturt University, Australia
- Swinburne University of Technology, Australia

== Gallery ==
Sideview of Manila Business College

Manila Business College in 2026

A group of students playing Chess during a 2026 sportsfest
