= STI College =

Private college in the Philippines

- STI College
- Former names: Systems Technology Institute (1983–2006)
- Motto: "Education For Real Life"; "Be future-ready. Be STI."
- Type: Private, for-profit studies, nonsectarian, coeducational (PSE: STI)
- Established: August 21, 1983; 42 years ago
- Founders: Augusto C. Lagman; Herman T. Gamboa; Benjamin A. Santos; Edgar H. Sarte
- Parent institution: STI Education Services Group, Inc. STI Education Systems Holdings, Inc.
- Chairman: Vanessa L. Tanco
- President: Monico V. Jacob (also Vice Chairman and Chief Executive Officer)
- Director: Monico V. Jacob
- Executive Chairman Emeritus: Eusebio H. Tanco
- Students: 117,000 nationwide
- Undergraduates: 13,200 a year
- Location: STI Academic Center, Ortigas Avenue Extension, Cainta, Rizal, Philippines
- Campus: Multiple campuses nationwide (67 campuses as of 2021)
- Colors: Yellow, blue & white
- Nickname: STIers, STI Olympians
- Mascot: Globe
- Website: www.sti.edu
- www.sti.edu/images/stilogo-160.png

STI College is one of the largest network university/colleges and senior high schools with more than 63 campuses in the Philippines. Wide array of in-demand programs are offered in STI College in the fields of Information Technology, Hospitality & Tourism, Multimedia Arts, Business & Accountancy, Computer Engineering, and Criminology.

STI uses a semestral calendar typical to the semester collegiate education program mostly used by Philippine universities.

== Ownership ==
STI College is wholly owned by the STI Education Services Group, Inc. (STI ESG), a subsidiary of the STI Education Systems Holdings, Inc. of Dr. Eusebio H. Tanco, PhD.

The STI Education Systems Holdings, Inc. is the holding company within the Tanco Group that drives investment in its education business. STI Education Systems Holdings, Inc. has 5 subsidiaries, namely: STI Education Services Group, Inc. (“STI ESG”), STI West Negros University, Inc. (“STI WNU”), Information and Communications Technology Academy, Inc. (“iACADEMY”), Attenborough Holdings Corporation (“AHC”) and Neschester Corporation (“Neschester”).

Eusebio Tanco also serves as the majority and principal owner of Maestro Holdings, Inc., formerly known as STI Investments, Inc., another company part of the Tanco Group.

STI College's Eusebio H. Tanco announced per a Philippine Stock Exchange disclosure, that its Board ratified the execution of a Term sheet with Philippine School of Business Administration (Manila & Quezon City) covering the takeover by STI of the operations of PSBA.

== History ==
STI College was a former computer center organized in 1983, when entrepreneurs Augusto C. Lagman, Herman T. Gamboa, Benjamin A. Santos and Edgar H. Sarte set up the Systems Technology Institute to train people in programming and IT. At first there were two schools, and then it grew to more than 70. The school was then purchased by Eusebio H. Tanco.

In 2006, the acronym of STI no longer stands as Systems Technology Institute as it offers not just only Technology and Science courses, but also Health, Arts, Management, Businesses, Hospitality, and Culinary, albeit up to the present time though, IT and CS courses are still the largest population in the institution. The initials STI therefore has been orphaned and becomes a pseudo-acronym.

In 2002, STI obtained a majority share in De los Santos College to create the De Los Santos – STI College of Health Professions. In 2006, STI also acquired a stake in the De Los Santos Medical Center, and was renamed to De Los Santos – STI Medical Center. The De Los Santos – STI College was later closed down and the De Los Santos – STI Medical Center reverted to their old name De Los Santos Medical Center when it was taken over by the Metro Pacific Hospital Holdings, Inc.

In October 2013, STI Health Professionals, Inc., a subsidiary of STI ESG and operator of De Los Santos – STI College, purchased Makati Medical Center College from Medical Doctors, Inc. through its sister school PWU. PWU was in a joint venture arrangement with STI at the time. That arrangement has since ended and PWU has sold Makati Medical Center College (now Medici Di Makati College). In 2019, the STI Education Services Group acquired maritime school STI NAMEI.

== Other branches and campuses ==
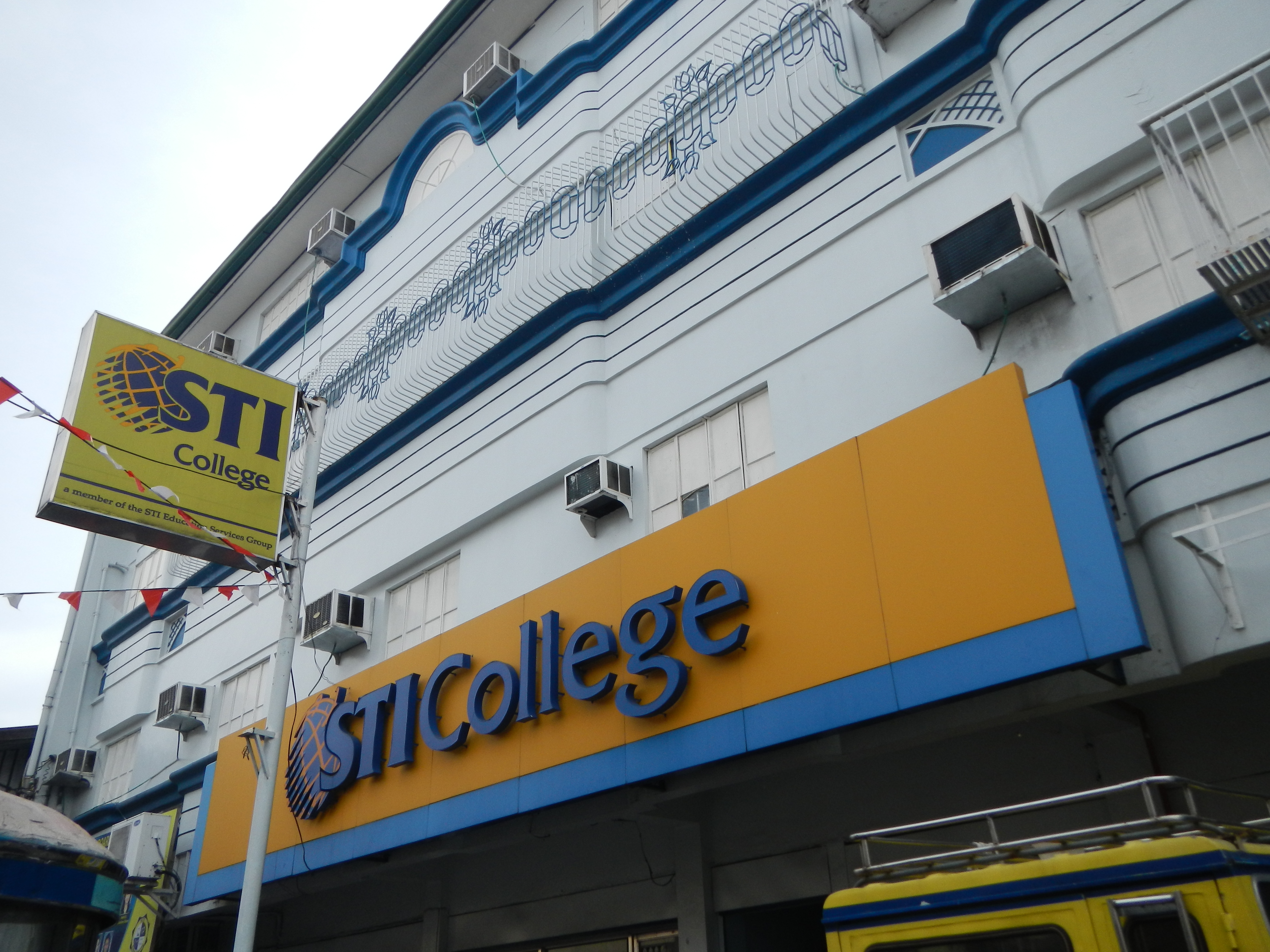
STI College - Santa Cruz in Santa Cruz, Laguna

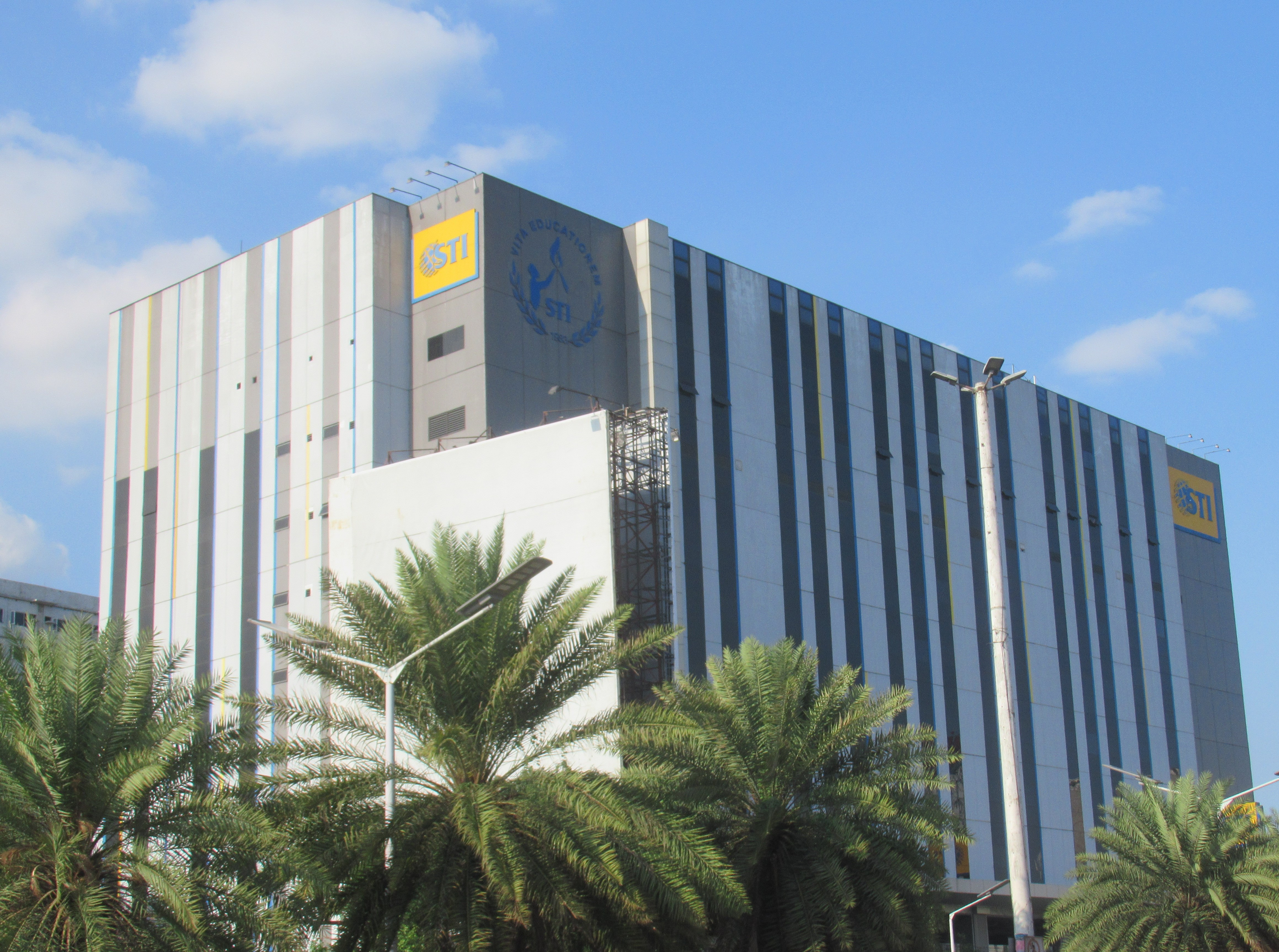
STI College Pasay-EDSA in Pasay

Some of STI's campuses nationwide uses various STI trade names. Student population mainly determine the longevity of the campuses. STI Education Systems Holdings also owns and operates one non-STI branded college and manages one acquired university.

Other higher education institutions owned by STI

- iAcademy
- STI West Negros University (STI WNU)
- STI NAMEI

== See also ==
- List of universities and colleges in the Philippines
- Academia Education Systems Holdings, Inc. (stylized as academia) registered on the Philippine Stock Exchange
