= STI NAMEI =

Private school in Manila, Philippines

STI NAMEI Polytechnic Institute
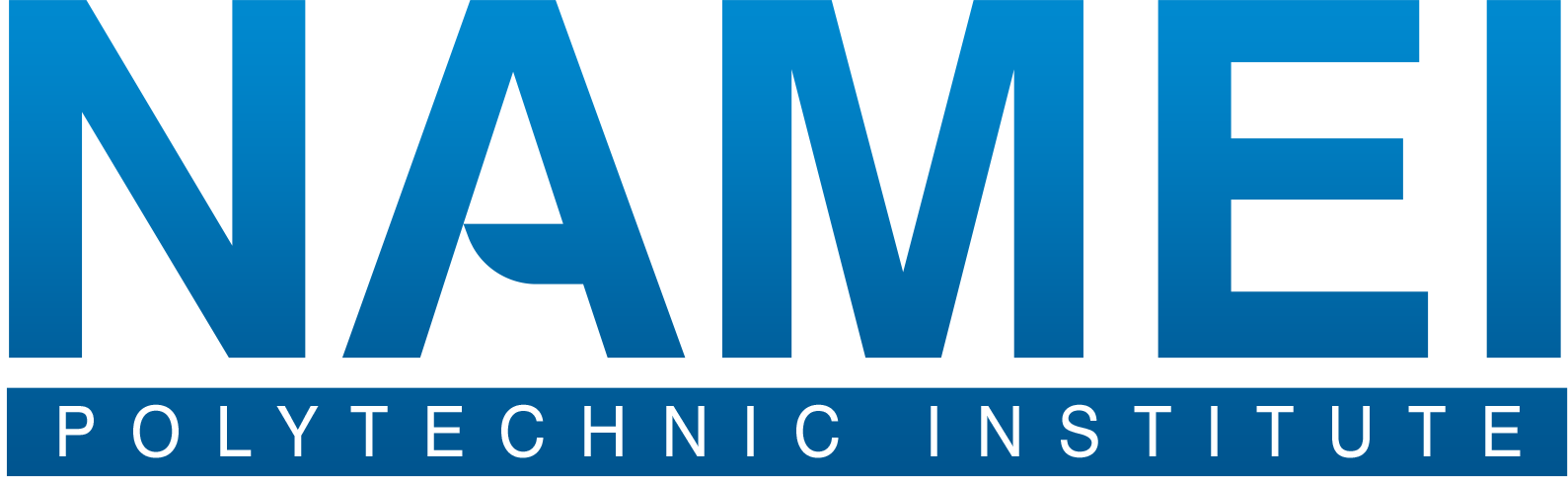
- Other name: STI NAMEI
- Former names: Naval Architecture and Marine Engineering Institute
- Established: 1947
- Founder: Don Felix B. Padilla
- Parent institution: STI Education Services Group, Inc.
- Academic affiliations: Philippine Association of Colleges and Universities
- President: Peter K. Fernandez
- Location: Manila, Philippines; 14°35′39″N 121°01′32″E
- Location in Manila Location in Metro Manila Location in Luzon Location in the Philippines

STI NAMEI, formerly the NAMEI Polytechnic Institute, is a private school in Manila, Philippines. It was established by Don Felix B. Padilla as the Naval Architecture and Marine Engineering Institute (NAMEI) in 1947. In 2019, was acquired by the STI Education Services Group, Inc. and was later renamed as STI NAMEI.

== Campus ==
Its former campus was located at A. Mabini Street in Barangay Mabini-J. Rizal, Mandaluyong. After the institute was acquired by STI in 2019, the school moved to the newly-constructed STI Academic Center in Sta. Mesa, Manila which is now the home to both STI College Sta. Mesa (formerly STI College Shaw) and the NAMEI Polytechnic Institute, which were both formerly located in Mandaluyong.

== Offering ==
All students from kindergarten to senior high school were transferred but the kindergarten and elementary division were dissolved after 1 week of online classes in Microsoft Teams because they can't handle 56 elementary and kinder students anymore and they will be moved to Tsungwa University; however, some students were transferred to MCA or Arellano University since enrollments are ongoing.
