= Makati Medical Center =

Private hospital in Metro Manila, Philippines

- Medical Doctors Inc.

- The entrance along Amorsolo Street

Geography
- Location: 2 Amorsolo Street, Legaspi Village, Makati, Metro Manila, Philippines
- Coordinates: 14°33′33″N 121°00′53″E

Organization
- Type: Private / Teaching
- Affiliated university: Medici Di Makati College

Services
- Standards: JCI (6th ed) accredited
- Emergency department: Level I Trauma
- Beds: More than 600

History
- Former name: Makati General Hospital
- Opened: May 31, 1969; 56 years ago BGC Bus: AX07 City Gate

Links
- Website: www.makatimed.net.ph

Makati Medical Center (MMC), also known as Makati Med, is a tertiary hospital in Makati, Metro Manila, Philippines. The hospital was founded on May 31, 1969. The hospital is owned and operated by Medical Doctors Inc., a subsidiary of Metro Pacific Investments Corporation, a Philippine-based unit investment holding company of First Pacific Company Limited, Hong Kong, through Metro Pacific Holdings, Inc.

== Clemenia twins separation ==
In 1997, the hospital performed the country's first successful surgical separation of the rare congenital anomaly of conjoined Tetrapus Ischiopagus twins. Dr. Raul G. Fores immediately approved their transfer to Makati Medical Center's pediatric nursery, where they were raised by the pediatric staff until they were ready to be operated on.

The Makati Medical Center team took nine months of preparation, planning, and mock exercises before the actual operation took place. In May 1998, pediatricians, plastic surgeons, pediatric surgeons, urologists, orthopedic surgeons, anesthesiologists, nurses, and operating room attendants spent 17 hours on the operation.

== Reception ==
In 2011, MakatiMed became the first and only Philippine health institution to be certified with the 4th edition Joint Commission International accreditation and the 4th hospital in the country to be accredited as well.

Also in 2011, Asian Hospital Management Awards (AHMA) gave MakatiMed an “A Decade of Achievement” special award. This recognition was given to the top three hospitals who won the most Asian Hospital Management Awards in the 10 years of HMA. MakatiMed is the only hospital in the Philippines given this recognition.

== Partnerships with other hospitals ==
MakatiMed launched the Strategic Hospital Alliance Program, or SHAP, in July 2010. The program is geared toward expanding and sharing MakatiMed's services with the rest of the country by establishing partnerships with hospitals located in other cities and the provinces.

Under this program, MakatiMed's partner hospitals may refer patients to MakatiMed in order for them to access facilities and services that their local hospitals cannot or do not yet provide. These hospitals can also gain access to diagnostic equipment and tools that would otherwise require substantial investments.

As of September 2012, MakatiMed had 65 hospital partners all over the country.

== Makati Medical Center College ==
Makati Medical Center College is a medical school located at Libran House, 144 Legazpi corner Bolanos Streets, Legaspi Village, Makati. It offers Bachelor of Science in Nursing and other health related courses. Established on May 30, 1976, it was given the name Remedios T. Romualdez Memorial School, in memory of the mother of Imelda Romualdez-Marcos, the first lady of the Philippines during that time. On February 26, 2010, it was changed to Makati Medical Center College. In October 2013, STI Health Professionals Inc., operator of De Los Santos – STI College, purchased all of MMCC from Medical Doctors Inc. through its sister school Philippine Women's University (PWU). The school was later renamed Medici Di Makati College when it became autonomous after STI and PWU's arrangement ended.
