= De Los Santos – STI College =

Private college in Quezon City, Philippines

- Other name: De Los Santos – STI College of Health Professions
- Former name: De Los Santos College
- Type: Private Medical college
- Active: October 30, 1945–2015
- Academic affiliations: STI College
- Location: Quezon City, Metro Manila, Philippines; 14°37′12.88″N 121°1′4.91″E
- Location in Metro Manila Location in Luzon Location in the Philippines

The De Los Santos – STI College of Health Professions (formerly known as De Los Santos College and later renamed to simply De Los Santos – STI College Inc.) was a merged institute between the De Los Santos College and STI College. It is located along Eulogio Rodriguez Senior Boulevard, in Quezon City, Philippines.

== History ==
The De Los Santos College was established and recognized by DECS (Dept. of Education, Culture and Sports) in 1975 as part of the expanding services of the De Los Santos Medical Center (now known as DLS – STI Medical Center) to the Filipino community. It was founded by Dr. Jose V. De Los Santos, founder of Philippine Orthopedics in 1975. The school opened its College of Nursing with 65 students. Applications were limited and only those high school graduating students with a minimum rating of 95% in their NCEE (National College Entrance Examination) were accepted into the College of Nursing to increase the quality of the institution. In 1981, the school opened degree programs in Junior Secretarial and Midwifery. The DLS College also included the College of Physical Therapy which has received DECS authority to operate in June 1993.

In September 2002, the merger with Systems Technological Institute (STI), an Information and Communications Technology centered educational institution was established. The merger produced DLS-STI College of Health Professions Inc.

In October 2013, STI Health Professionals, purchased 100 percent of Makati Medical Center College Inc. from Medical Doctors Inc., a subsidiary of the Metro Pacific Investments Corporation, through its sister company PWU. It later became an autonomous institution when STI and PWU's arrangement ended and was renamed since.

De Los Santos – STI College was later closed in 2015 and some of its operations were transferred to STI College – Quezon Avenue, Inc. in which it was later closed down in 2020.
