= Polytechnic University of the Philippines San Juan =

Public university in Metro Manila, Philippines

Polytechnic University of the Philippines San Juan Campus
- Former name: Addition Hills Elementary School
- Motto: Tanglaw ng Bayan
- Motto in English: Light of the Nation
- Type: Public
- Established: February 20, 2008; 18 years ago
- Accreditation: Accrediting Agency of Chartered Colleges and Universities in the Philippines
- Academic affiliations: Association of Southeast Asian Institutions of Higher Learning; International Association of Universities; National Athletic Association of Schools, Colleges and Universities; Philippine Association of State Universities and Colleges; State Colleges and Universities Athletic Association
- President: Manuel Muhi
- Director: Cecillia P. Reyes-Alagon
- Location: San Juan, Philippines; 14°35′40″N 121°02′25″E
- Campus: Urban
- Colors: Maroon and gold
- Nickname: Mighty Maroons
- Mascot: Pylon
- Website: www.pup.edu.ph
- Location in Metro Manila Location in Luzon Location in Philippines

Facade of the PUP San Juan campus in 2019

The Polytechnic University of the Philippines – San Juan Campus (abbreviated as PUPSJ or PUPSJC and also known as PUP San Juan) is one of the campuses of the Polytechnic University of the Philippines located in Addition Hills, San Juan, Metro Manila, Philippines. It was created through a Memorandum of Agreement between PUP and the San Juan city government in 2008, converting the Addition Hills Elementary School as one of the campus of PUP, making it the only community college in the locality.

It is composed of the College of Accountancy and Finance, the College of Public Administration, the College of Computer and Information Sciences, the College of Education, and the College of Tourism and Hotel and Restaurant Management.

== Academics ==
PUP San Juan is composed of five colleges which are extensions of the colleges from PUP Manila. The five colleges are the College of Accountancy and Finance, the College of Public Administration, the College of Computer and Information Sciences, the College of Education, and the College of Tourism and Hotel and Restaurant Management. Students are transferred to PUP Manila to complete their final year in their chosen course.
