= Metropolitan Hospital College of Nursing =

Private college in Metro Manila, Philippines

Metropolitan Medical Center College of Arts, Science and Technology
- Metropolitan Medical Center College of Arts, Science and Technology
- Former names: Metropolitan Hospital College of Nursing
- Established: 1976
- Location: 1357 G. Masangkay cor. Mayhaligue, Sta. Cruz Manila, Sta. Cruz, Manila, Philippines; 14°36′35″N 120°58′41″E
- Campus: Metropolitan Medical Arts Building
- Colors: Red and White
- Nickname: Metronista

The Metropolitan Medical Center College of Arts, Science and Technology or (MMC-CAST) is a school of nursing located in Santa Cruz, Manila, Philippines. It was founded in 1976, and is owned and operated by the United Doctors Association, which is an affiliate of the Metropolitan Medical Center.
