= Asian Institute of Computer Studies =

School in Quezon City, Philippines

- Other name: AICS
- Motto: Go Beyond Learning
- Type: Private higher education institution
- Established: November 1996; 29 years ago
- Founder: Manuel T. Asis
- Accreditation: Commission on Higher Education; Technical Education and Skills Development Authority; Department of Education
- President: Anthony S. Asis
- Academic staff: 65^{*}
- Students: 1,866^{*}
- Location: Quezon City, Metro Manila, Philippines; 14.67891°N 121.08280°E
- Website: www.aics.edu.ph
- Location in Metro Manila Location in Luzon Location in the Philippines
- ^{*} For academic year 2018–19.

Asian Institute of Computer Studies (AICS) is a private and nonsectarian higher education institution in Quezon City, Metro Manila, Philippines. It was founded in November 1996 by Manuel T. Asis and has academic offerings focusing on computer science, information and communications technology, and business studies.

== History ==
The institution was established by Manuel T. Asis in November 1996 in Fairview, Quezon City and began to offer two-year courses in computer science, computer technology, and computer secretarial, and other computer-related short programs. Located in front of SM Fairview, the pioneer branch served the nearby areas such as Lagro, Bagong Silang, Novaliches, and Bulacan. A branch outside of the city was opened in June 1997 in Sampaloc, Manila. AICS expanded its venture outside Metro Manila with the opening of the Dau branch in Mabalacat, Pampanga and the Bacoor branch in Bacoor, Cavite in June 1998. The Bachelor of Science in Computer Science degree began to be offered in 2001. A branch outside Luzon was opened in July 2015 in Cebu City, Cebu. As of 2016, Anthony S. Asis serves as the president of AICS.

== Branches ==
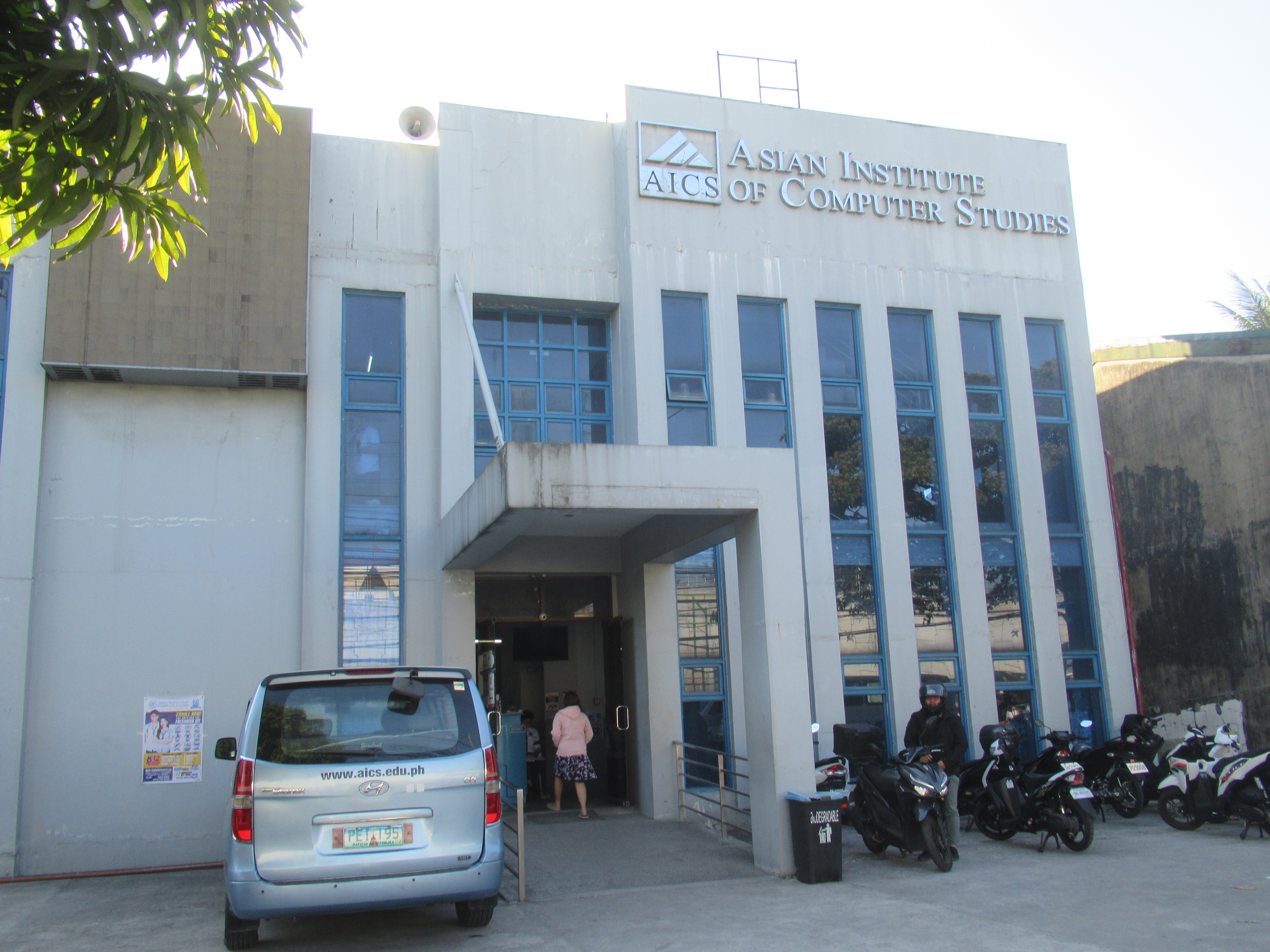
AICS Commonwealth

As of 2024, AICS has twelve branches located in Luzon and Visayas. Its branch at Barangay Holy Spirit, Quezon City serves as the head office.

| Branch | Location |
Central branches
| Commonwealth | Holy Spirit, Quezon City |
| Montalban | San Jose, Rodriguez, Rizal |
| Tanay | Plaza Aldea, Tanay, Rizal |
| Taytay | San Juan, Taytay, Rizal |
North branches
| Cebu | Capitol Site, Cebu City, Cebu |
| Meycauayan | Calvario, Meycauayan, Bulacan |
| Tarlac | Santo Cristo, Tarlac City, Tarlac |
South branches
| Bacoor | Panapaan I, Bacoor, Cavite |
| Batangas | Barangay 11, Batangas City, Batangas |
| Bicutan | Don Bosco, Parañaque |
| Lipa | Sabang, Lipa, Batangas |
Former branches
| Balagtas | Borol 1st, Balagtas, Bulacan |
| Baliwag | Bagong Nayon, Baliwag, Bulacan |
| Cabanatuan | City Supermarket, Cabanatuan, Nueva Ecija |
| Calamba | Barangay 1, Calamba, Laguna |
| Caloocan | Barangay 86, Caloocan |
| Cogeo | Dela Paz, Antipolo, Rizal |
| Cubao | San Martin de Porres, Quezon City |
| Dasmariñas | Zone IV, Dasmariñas, Cavite |
| Dau | Dau, Mabalacat, Pampanga |
| España | Barangay 397, Manila |
| Fairview | Greater Lagro, Quezon City |
| GMA | Gavino Maderan, General Mariano Alvarez, Cavite |
| Guadalupe | Guadalupe Nuevo, Makati |
| Marikina | Santo Niño, Marikina |
| Marilao | Ibayo, Marilao, Bulacan |
| Novaliches | Gulod, Quezon City |
| Olongapo | West Bajac-bajac, Olongapo, Zambales |
| San Fernando | San Jose, San Fernando, Pampanga |
| San Pedro | San Vicente, San Pedro, Laguna |
| Shaw Blvd. | San Antonio, Pasig |
| Sta. Rosa | Balibago, Santa Rosa, Laguna |
| Urdaneta | Poblacion, Urdaneta, Pangasinan |

== Academics ==
As of 2024, AICS offers four degrees for their college course: Bachelor of Science in Computer Science (BSCS), Bachelor of Science in Computer Engineering (BSCpE), Bachelor of Science in entrepreneurship (BSEntrep), and Bachelor in Technical & Livelihood Education Major in ICT (BTLEd Major in ICT). They also offer CCNA-related courses, in partnership with Cisco Networking Academy, and short courses, which includes learning Microsoft Office tools.

AICS is accredited by the Technical Education and Skills Development Authority to offer technical and vocational education and training (TVET) courses. As part of the K to 12 curriculum of the Department of Education, AICS started accepting students for senior high school in February 2016 for the 2016–17 school year.
