= Wesleyan College of Manila =

Christian college in Pasay, Philippines

- Motto: Unity, Piety, Learning
- Type: Private
- Established: 2000
- Founder: Bishop Emerito Nacpil
- Religious affiliation: Methodist
- President: Dr. Florita V. Miranda
- Principal: Cristina Miranda
- Dean: York Han
- Location: 1706 Leveriza Street,, Pasay, Metro Manila, Philippines; 14°33′36″N 120°59′35″E
- Colors: Purple
- Website: wcmanila.edu.ph
- Location in Metro Manila Location in Luzon Location in the Philippines

Wesleyan College of Manila is a Methodist-affiliated college situated in Pasay in Metro Manila, Philippines.

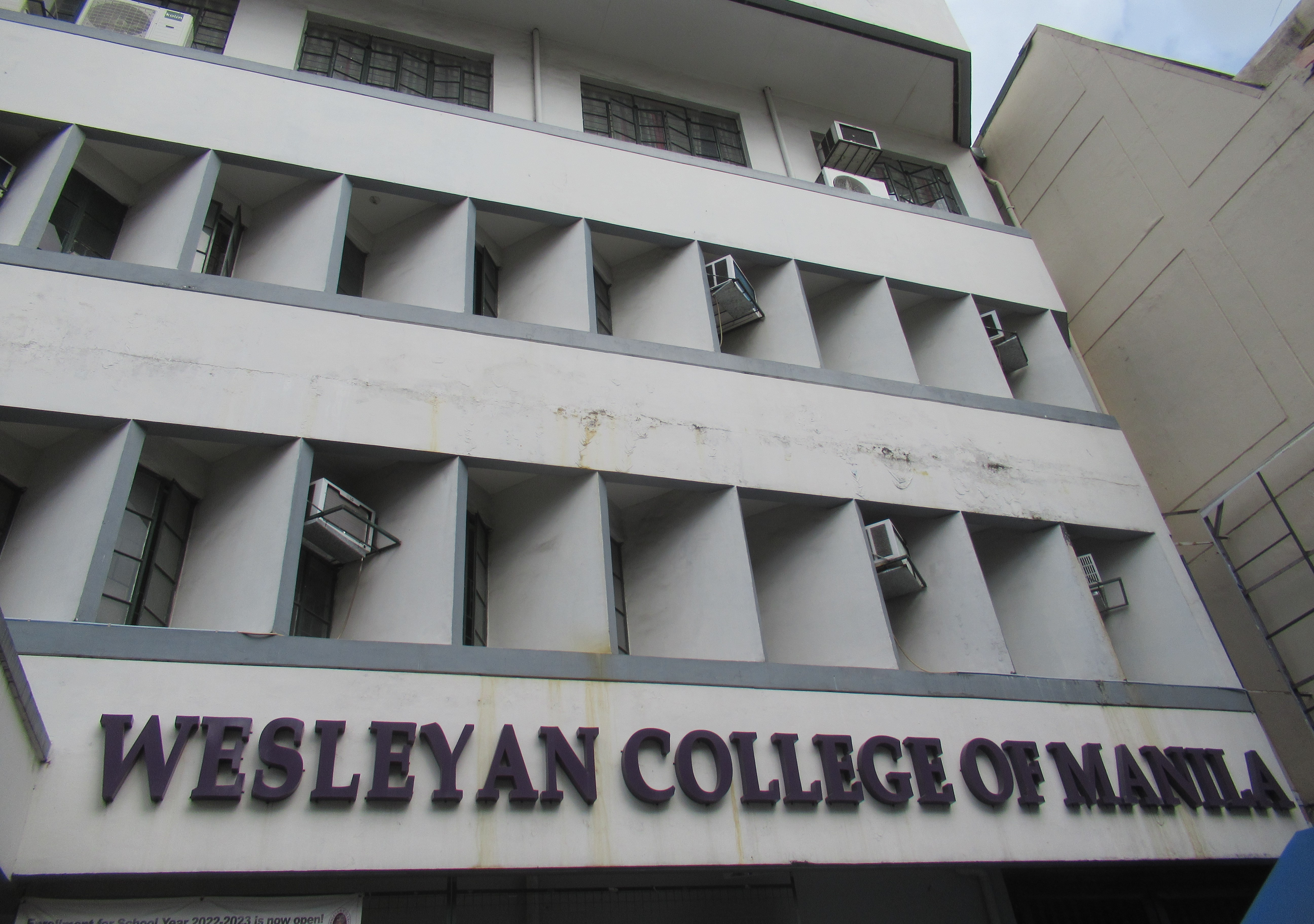
Wesleyan College of Manila

== History ==
Wesleyan College of Manila was originally a concept by Manila Episcopal Area Bishop, Emerito P. Nacpil. Methodist leaders, Carlito S. Puno, Rodolfo C. Beltran, Level S. Puno, Liz Pajaro-Mariano, Perla E. Cenon, and the BOT members of Wesleyan University-Philippines in Cabanatuan were involved in the establishment of the educational institution. Wesleyan College of Manila was founded in June 2000 as a branch of WUP Cabanatuan. The Management Committee chaired by Leopoldo Serrano Jr. was created to oversee the affairs of WUP Manila.

The school administration which includes the WUP Cabanatuan Board and the Management Committee, experienced difficulties on its first year of operation. From June to August 2000, WUP Manila was housed at the CRS Tower in Paco, Manila. In September 2000, Wesleyan Manila moved to Taft corner President Quirino Avenue in Malate, Manila in a bid to meet certain requirements set by the Commission on Higher Education (CHED) due to the limited space available in the initial location. With the help of CHED Commissioner Kate Botengan and Bishop Emerito P. Nacpil, the CHED NCR Director gave Wesleyan Manila the go signal to proceed provided a more suitable venue or campus be found as soon as possible. Shortly before the expiration of the grace period granted by CHED, the administrators of WUP Manila spotted a lot suited for the purpose. The administration sought the approval of the Board of Trustees for the purchase of the lot. Negotiations were made and in less than a month, construction was started.

WUP Manila along with other branches of WUP Cabanatuan were planned to become autonomous. This goal for WUP Manila was met when the Securities and Exchange Commission approved the incorporation of the Wesleyan College of Manila on June 18, 2003. The incorporators and the members of the Board of Wesleyan College of Manila are active and distinguished Methodist leaders. The initial Board of Trustees after the incorporation were Betty I. Molino, Cecilia P. del Rosario, Lydia S. Aherrera, Lorna S. Dee, and Aurora M. Patugalan with Molino as Chairperson.

Wesleyan College of Manila is currently situated along Leveriza Street corner Balagtas Street in Pasay and claims to be the "only Methodist of higher learning in Metro Manila". The college also began to offer primary and secondary education from Nursery to Senior High School levels.
