= List of Philippine men's collegiate basketball champions =

Men's collegiate basketball in particular, and intercollegiate athletics in general is fragmented in the Philippines.

The National Collegiate Athletic Association (Philippines) and University Athletic Association of the Philippines are the Metro Manila leagues that receive the most attention, owing to their national television coverage, with the UAAP in particular described as the country's "premier and more popular league". The biggest league outside the region is CESAFI.

== Champions per season ==
Season	NCAA	UAAP	Cebu (Note: Includes champions from Cebu Collegiate Athletic Association (CCAA) and Cebu Amateur Athletic Association (CAAA) before 2000, and Cebu Schools Athletic Foundation, Inc. (CESAFI) since 2001.)	NCAA-South	NAASCU	UCAA	MNCAA	UCLAA	ISAA	NCRAA	CUSA
1924–25	UP Manila										
1925–26	UP Manila										
1926–27	UP Manila										
1927–28	San Beda										
1928–29	Ateneo										
1929–30	UP Manila										
1930–31	UST										
1931–32	Ateneo										
1932–33	Ateneo										
1933–34	Ateneo										
1934–35	San Beda										
1935–36	San Beda										
1936–37	San Beda										
1937–38	Ateneo										
1938–39	Letran	FEU									
1939–40	La Salle	FEU; UP Manila; UST									
1940–41	San Beda	UST									
1941–42	Ateneo	Not held									
1942–43	Not held	Not held									
1943–44	Not held	Not held									
1944–45	Not held	Not held									
1945–46	Not held	Not held									
1946–47	Not held	UST									
1947–48	La Salle	UST; FEU (Note: Co-champions)									
1948–49	JRC	UST									
1949–50	Mapúa	UST									
1950–51	Letran	FEU									
1951–52	San Beda	UST									
1952–53	Mapúa	UST									
1953–54	Ateneo	UST									
1954–55	Ateneo	NU									
1955–56	San Beda	UST	UV								
1956–57	San Beda	FEU	USC								
1957–58	Ateneo	UE	UV								
1958–59	Ateneo	UE	USC								
1959–60	San Beda	UST	UV								
1960–61	Letran	UE									
1961–62	Ateneo	FEU									
1962–63	Suspended (Note: Suspended by the NCAA due to hooliganism and proliferation of ineligible players.)	UE									
1963–64	JRC (Note: Seniors championships awarded on the 1963–64 and 1964–65 seasons were later ruled as unofficial by the NCAA.)	UST	UV								
1964–65	JRC	UST									
1965–66	Mapúa	UE									
1966–67	Letran	UE									
1967–68	JRC	UE; UST									
1968–69	JRC	UE									
1969–70	Ateneo	UE									
1970–71	Letran	UE									
1971–72	La Salle	UE	UV								
1972–73	JRC	FEU	UV								
1973–74	San Sebastian	FEU									
1974–75	Letran	UE	No champion declared (Note: The 1974 championship game between UV and SWU was abandoned after a fight broke out 8 minutes into the game. The score of the game at that time was 16–14 in favor of UV.)								
1975–76	Ateneo	UE									
1976–77	Ateneo	FEU									
1977–78	San Beda	Adamson	UV								
1978–79	San Beda	UE	UV								
1979–80	Letran	FEU	UV								
1980–81	Aborted (Note: Tournament aborted by the Basketball Association of the Philippines after a second-round game riot between La Salle and Letran.)	FEU									
1981–82	Mapúa	FEU									
1982–83	Letran	UE	UV								
1983–84	Letran	FEU	UV								
1984–85	Letran	UE	UV								
1985–86	San Sebastian	UE	UV								
1986–87	San Sebastian	UP	USJ–R								
1987–88	Letran	Ateneo	USJ–R								
1988–89	San Sebastian	Ateneo									
1989–90	San Sebastian	La Salle	CIT								
1990–91	San Sebastian	La Salle									
1991–92	Mapúa	FEU* (Note: With La Salle having the twice-to-beat advantage, they won the championship in Game 1. However, it was revealed that a La Salle player that was disqualified played in the final seconds of the game. FEU protested the game and the UAAP granted the protest. La Salle did not show up in the replay and forfeited the championship series, despite the Basketball Association of the Philippines supporting La Salle.)	USJ–R								
1992–93	Letran	FEU									
1993–94	San Sebastian	UST	USJ–R							PSBA	
1994–95	San Sebastian	UST	Cebu Doctors'							St. Francis	
1995–96	San Sebastian	UST	UV							St. Francis	TIP
1996–97	San Sebastian	UST	UV							PSBA	MLQU
1997–98	San Sebastian	FEU	UV							PSBA	MLQU
1998–99	Letran	La Salle	UC							La Salle "B"	?
1999–2000	Letran	La Salle	Cebu Doctors'	?						St. Francis	?
2000–01	Benilde	La Salle	SWU	?						St. Francis	?
2001–02	San Sebastian	La Salle	UV	?	UM					St. Francis	Assumption
2002–03	San Sebastian	Ateneo	UV	San Beda Alabang	UM	St. Francis				St. Francis	LPC
2003–04	Letran	FEU	UV	?	UM	St. Francis				St. Francis	LPC
2004–05	PCU	FEU* (Note: De La Salle University admitted to have unknowingly fielded two ineligible players for the last 3 years (from 2003–2005) and forfeited the 2004–05 championship by returning it to the UAAP board. As a result, FEU was awarded the men's basketball championship for the 2004–2005 season on November 21, 2006.; De La Salle's results from 2003–2005 were forfeited.; De La Salle was suspended in the 2006–07 season, on all UAAP events.)	UV	?	UM	EAC	?			EAC	PMI
2005–06	Letran	FEU	UV	?	UM	EAC	?			St. Francis	PMI
2006–07	San Beda	UST	UV	?	AMACU	EAC	?			Arellano	MLQU
2007–08	San Beda	La Salle	UV	?	STI	St. Francis	?			Arellano	MLQU
2008–09	San Beda	Ateneo	UV	Don Bosco	SSC-R Cavite	Universal	?	St. Francis		Universal	Not held
2009–10	San Sebastian	Ateneo	UV	Don Bosco	SSC-R Cavite	Universal	?	St. Francis	Lyceum	Olivarez	Not held
2010–11	San Beda	Ateneo	UC	UPHS Laguna	UM	CSM	CEU	St. Francis	Lyceum	CSM	Not held
2011–12	San Beda	Ateneo	UC	UPHS Laguna	UM	PSBA	CEU	St. Francis	TIP	PMMS	
2012–13	San Beda	Ateneo	SWU	St. Francis	St. Clare	Olivarez	La Salle	St. Francis	PMMS	Olivarez	
2013–14	San Beda	La Salle	UV	UB	CEU	RTU		PCCr	LaCo	St. Clare	
2014–15	San Beda	NU	SWU	San Beda Alabang	CEU	RTU	CEU	PATTS		PMMS	
2015–16	Letran	FEU	USC		CEU		PWU			PMMS	
2016–17	San Beda	La Salle	UV		St. Clare					CDSL	
2017–18	San Beda	Ateneo	UV	Holy Cross College of Sasa, Inc.	St. Clare						
2018–19	San Beda	Ateneo	UV		St. Clare		CEU				
2019–20	Letran	Ateneo	SWU		St. Clare		Cancelled				
2020–21	Not held due to the COVID-19 pandemic in the Philippines.										
2021–22	Letran	UP	Not held		Not held		Not held				
2022–23	Letran	Ateneo	UV	UB	St. Clare		CEU				
2023–24	San Beda	La Salle	UV	San Pablo Colleges	St. Clare				LaCo		
2024–25	Mapúa	UP	UV		St. Clare				SDCA		
2025–26	San Beda	La Salle									
Season	NCAA	UAAP	Cebu	NCAA-South	NAASCU	UCAA	MNCAA	UCLAA	ISAA	NCRAA	CUSA

== Championships per school ==
School	NCAA	UAAP	CESAFI / CAAA	NCAA South	NAASCU	UCAA	MNCAA	UCLAA	ISAA	NCRAA	CUSA	Total
University of the Visayas			32									32
Ateneo de Manila University	14	12										26
San Beda University	24											24
Colegio de San Juan de Letran	20											20
Far Eastern University*		20										20
University of Santo Tomas	1	18										19
University of the East		18										18
Saint Francis of Assisi College System				2		3		5		8		18
De La Salle University	5	10 (Note: Does not consider the disputed 1991 championship where De La Salle did not attend the replayed Game 1.) (11)								1		16
San Sebastian College – Recoletos	14											14
University of Manila					7							7
Centro Escolar University					3		3					6
Mapúa Institute of Technology	6											5
University of the Philippines, Manila	4	1										5
Centro Escolar University					2		2					4
Emilio Aguinaldo College	0					3				1		4
José Rizal University (Note: Excludes 2 championships won on loose conference seasons.)	7											4
Olivarez College						1				3		4
Philippine School of Business Administration						1				3		4
Colegio de Santa Monica						1				2		3
Southwestern University			3									3
Universal College						2				1		3
University of the Philippines, Diliman		3										3
Arellano University	0				0					2		2
Don Bosco Technical College				2								2
Lyceum of the Philippines University	0								2			2
Manuel L. Quezon University											2	2
National University	0	2										2
PMI Colleges										0	2	2
Rizal Technological University						2						2
Saint Clare College of Caloocan					1					1		2
San Sebastian College – Recoletos de Cavite					2							2
University of Cebu			2									2
University of Perpetual Help System Laguna				2								2
Adamson University		1										1
AMA Computer University					1					0		1
De La Salle-College of Saint Benilde	1											1
La Consolacion College									1			1
Las Piñas College					0	1						1
Philippine Christian University	1											1
Philippine College of Criminology								1				1
Philippine Merchant Marine School									1			1
San Beda College Alabang				1								1
STI College					1							1
Technological Institute of the Philippines									1			1
University of Batangas				1								1
University of the Assumption											1	1

== Major contemporary collegiate and university champions ==
This list is limited to the two major Metro Manila leagues, the Cebuano leagues, along with the two major intercollegiate offseason leagues (Filoil and PCCL) which include schools from other associations such as CESAFI in Cebu and NAASCU which is mainly based in Manila. The respective NCAA and UAAP schools have jumped between the two leagues and regularly hold the following intercollegiate tournaments. For 13 out of 21 seasons, champions from mainly Filoil, or occasionally PCCL tournaments, have gone on to win the championship in their respective home leagues.

Key
Indicator	Meaning
	School won the championship in two leagues in the same year
	School won the championship in three leagues in the same year
(No.)	Number of titles

=== Early years (1924–1942) ===
After 1930, when UST won its only NCAA title, UST, UP, FEU, and NU left the NCAA to form a Big Three League of the top sports schools which also attained university status, that later officially became the UAAP in 1938.

Season	NCAA	UAAP
1924–25	UP Manila (1)	Not established
1925–26	UP Manila (2)	Not established
1926–27	UP Manila (3)	Not established
1927–28	San Beda (1)	Not established
1928–29	Ateneo (1)	Not established
1929–30	UP Manila (4)	Not established
1930–31	UST (1)	Not established
1931–32	Ateneo (2)	Not established
1932–33	Ateneo (3)	Not established
1933–34	Ateneo (4)	Not established
1934–35	San Beda (2)	Not established
1935–36	San Beda (3)	Not established
1936–37	San Beda (4)	Not established
1937–38	Ateneo (5)	Not established
1938–39	Letran (1)	FEU (1)
1939–40	La Salle (1)	FEU (2); UP (1); UST (1)
1940–41	San Beda (5)	UST (2)
1941–42	Ateneo (6)	No tournament

=== Postwar era (1946–1980) ===
Season	NCAA	UAAP	CAAA
1946–47	No tournament	UST (3)	
1947–48	La Salle (2)	FEU (3); UST (4)	
1948–49	JRC (1)	UST (5)	
1949–50	Mapúa (1)	UST (6)	
1950–51	Letran (2)	FEU (4)	
1951–52	San Beda (6)	UST (7)	
1952–53	San Beda (7)	UST (8)	
1953–54	Ateneo (8)	UST (9)	
1954–55	Ateneo (7)	NU (1)	
1955–56	San Beda (8)	UST (10)	UV (1)
1956–57	La Salle (3)	FEU (5)	USC (1)
1957–58	Ateneo (9)	UE (1)	UV (2)
1958–59	Ateneo (10)	UE (2)	USC (2)
1959–60	San Beda (9)	UST (11)	UV (3)
1960–61	Letran (3)	UE (3)	
1961–62	Ateneo (11)	FEU (6)	
1962–63	No tournament	UE (5)	
1963–64	JRC (2)	UE (5)	UV (4)
1964–65	JRC (3)	UST (12)	
1965–66	Mapúa (2)	UE (6)	
1966–67	Letran (4)	UE (7)	
1967–68	JRC (4)	UE (8); UST (13)	
1968–69	JRC (5)	UE (9)	
1969–70	Ateneo (12)	UE (10)	
1970–71	Letran (5)	UE (11)	
1971–72	La Salle (4)	UE (12)	UV (5)
1972–73	JRC (6)	FEU (7)	UV (6)
1973–74	San Sebastian (1)	FEU (8)	
1974–75	La Salle (5)	UE (13)	No champion declared
1975–76	Ateneo (13)	UE (14)	
1976–77	Ateneo (14)	FEU (9)	
1977–78	San Beda (10)	Adamson (1)	UV (7)
1978–79	San Beda (11)	UE (15)	UV (8)
1979–80	Letran (6)	FEU (10)	UV (9)

=== Final transfers (1980–1993) ===
The makeup of both collegiate leagues was finalized in 1980 with the last remnants of the founding NCAA members leaving for the UAAP in Ateneo (left NCAA and joined UAAP in 1978) and La Salle (left NCAA in 1980, joined UAAP in 1986), along with San Beda, who returned to the NCAA after a short hiatus in 1984. The CAAA continued throughout the era.

Season	NCAA	UAAP	CAAA
1980–81	Tournament aborted by the BAP	FEU (11)	
1981–82	Mapúa (3)	FEU (12)	
1982–83	Letran (7)	UE (16)	UV (10)
1983–84	Letran (8)	FEU (13)	UV (11)
1984–85	Letran (9)	UE (17)	UV (12)
1985–86	San Sebastian (2)	UE (18)	UV (13)
1986–87	Letran (10)	UP (2)	USJ–R (1)
1987–88	Letran (11)	Ateneo (1)	USJ–R (2)
1988–89	San Sebastian (3)	Ateneo (2)	
1989–90	San Sebastian (4)	La Salle (1)	CIT (1)
1990–91	Mapúa (4)	La Salle (2)	
1991–92	Mapúa (5)	FEU (14)	USJ–R (3)
1992–93	Letran (12)	FEU (15)	

=== Final Four era (1993–2003) ===
The UAAP adopted the Final Four format in 1993 while the NCAA followed suit in 1997. The CESAFI replaced the CAAA in 2001-02.

Season	NCAA	UAAP	Cebu
1993–94	San Sebastian (5)	UST (14)	USJ–R Jaguars (4)
1994–95	San Sebastian (6)	UST (15)	CDU (1)
1995–96	San Sebastian (7)	UST (16)	UV (14)
1996–97	San Sebastian (8)	UST (17)	UV (15)
1997–98	San Sebastian (9)	FEU (16)	UV (16)
1998–99	Letran (13)	La Salle (3)	UC (1)
1999–2000	Letran (14)	La Salle (4)	CDU (2)
2000–01	Benilde (1)	La Salle (5)	SWU (1)
2001–02	San Sebastian (10)	La Salle (6)	UV (17)
2002–03	San Sebastian (11)	Ateneo (3)	UV (18)

=== Modern era (2003–2020) ===
The Philippine Collegiate Champions League (PCCL) was established in 2003 while the Filoil EcoOil Preseason Cup was inaugurated as the Homegrown Cup in 2006.

Season	NCAA	UAAP	CESAFI	Filoil	PCCL
2003–04	Letran (15)	FEU (17)	UV (19)	Not established	UE (1)
2004–05	PCU (1)	FEU (18)	UV (20)	Not established	FEU (1)
2005–06	Letran (16)	FEU (19)	UV (21)	Not established	FEU (2)
2006–07	San Beda (12)	UST (18)	UV (22)	La Salle (1)	UE (2)
2007–08	San Beda (13)	La Salle (7)	UV (23)	La Salle (2)	Ateneo (1)
2008–09	San Beda (14)	Ateneo (4)	UV (24)	UE (1)	La Salle (1)
2009–10	San Sebastian (12)	Ateneo (5)	UV (25)	FEU (1)	La Salle (2)
2010–11	San Beda (15)	Ateneo (6)	UC (2)	San Sebastian (1)	Ateneo (2)
2011–12	San Beda (16)	Ateneo (7)	UC (3)	Ateneo (1)	San Sebastian (1)
2012–13	San Beda (17)	Ateneo (8)	SWU (2)	NU (1)	UST (1)
2013–14	San Beda (18)	La Salle (8)	UV (26)	UE (2)	La Salle (3)
2014–15	San Beda (19)	NU (2)	SWU (3)	La Salle (3)	San Beda (1)
2015–16	Letran (17)	FEU (20)	USC (3)	San Beda (1)	San Beda (2); FEU (3)
2016–17	San Beda (20)	La Salle (9)	UV (27)	La Salle (4)	No tournament
2017–18	San Beda (21)	Ateneo (9)	UV (28)	San Beda (2)	Lyceum (1)
2018–19	San Beda (22)	Ateneo (10)	UV (29)	Ateneo (2)	Ateneo (3)
2019–20	Letran (18)	Ateneo (11)	SWU (4)	San Beda (3)	Ateneo (4)

=== Post-pandemic era (2021–present) ===
The PCCL tournament was canceled due to the pandemic.

Season	NCAA	UAAP	CESAFI	Filoil
2021–22	Letran (19)	UP (3)	No tournament	No tournament
2022–23	Letran (20)	Ateneo (12)	UV (30)	NU (2)
2023–24	San Beda (23)	La Salle (10)	UV (31)	UP (1)
2024–25	Mapúa (6)	UP (4)	UV (32)	UP (2)
2025–26	San Beda (24)	La Salle (11)		UP (3)
2026–27				JRU (1)

=== List of major championships per school ===
Denotes school no longer a member of either NCAA or UAAP.

School	Current league	NCAA	UAAP	CESAFI	Combined	Filoil	PCCL	All	Last men's championship
University of the Visayas	CESAFI (Note: CAAA member school from 1930-00.)	–	–	32	32	–	–	32	2024-25 CESAFI
Ateneo de Manila University	UAAP (Note: NCAA member school from 1924–78.)	14	12	–	26	2	4	32	2022–23 UAAP
San Beda University	NCAA	24	–	–	24	3	2	29	2023–24 NCAA
Far Eastern University	UAAP (Note: NCAA member school from 1924–36.)	0	20	–	20	1	3	24	2015–16 UAAP
Colegio de San Juan de Letran	NCAA	20	–	–	20	0	0	20	2022–23 NCAA
University of the East	UAAP	–	18	–	18	2	2	22	2013–14 Filoil
De La Salle University	UAAP (Note: NCAA member school from 1924–81.)	5	10	–	15	4	3	22	2023–24 UAAP
University of Santo Tomas	UAAP (Note: NCAA member school from 1924–36.)	1	18	–	19	0	1	20	2012–13 PCCL
San Sebastian College–Recoletos	NCAA	12	–	–	12	1	1	14	2011–12 PCCL
University of the Philippines (Note: Competed under UP Manila in the NCAA and UP Diliman in the UAAP.)	UAAP (Note: NCAA member school from 1924–36.)	4	4	–	8	3	0	11	2025–26 Filoil
José Rizal University	NCAA	6	–	–	6	0	0	6	1972–73 NCAA
Mapúa University	NCAA	6	–	–	6	0	0	6	2024–25 NCAA
Southwestern University	CESAFI (Note: CAAA member school from 1930-00.)	–	–	4	4	–	–	4	2019-20 CESAFI
University of San Jose–Recoletos	CESAFI	–	–	4	4	–	–	4	2019-20 CESAFI
National University	UAAP (Note: NCAA member school from 1924–36.)	–	2	–	2	2	0	4	2022–23 Filoil
University of Cebu	CESAFI	–	–	3	3	–	–	3	2011-12 CESAFI
University of San Carlos	CESAFI	–	–	3	3	–	–	3	2015-16 CESAFI
Cebu Doctors' University	CESAFI (Note: CAAA member school from 1930-00.)	–	–	2	2	–	–	2	1999-00 CESAFI
Adamson University	UAAP	–	1	–	1	0	0	1	1977–78 UAAP
De La Salle–College of Saint Benilde	NCAA	1	–	–	1	0	0	1	2000–01 NCAA
Cebu Institute of Technology – University	CESAFI (Note: CAAA member school from 1930-00.)	–	–	1	1	–	–	1	1989-90 CESAFI
Philippine Christian University	NAASCU (Note: NCAA member school from 1996–2009.)	1	–	–	1	0	0	1	2004–05 NCAA
Lyceum of the Philippines University	NCAA	0	–	–	0	0	1	1	2017–18 PCCL
Arellano University	NCAA	0	–	–	0	0	0	0	None
Emilio Aguinaldo College	NCAA	0	–	–	0	0	0	0	None
University of Perpetual Help System DALTA	NCAA	0	–	–	0	0	0	0	None
Angeles University Foundation	UCLAA (Note: NCAA guest school from 2009–10.)	0	–	–	0	0	0	0	None
Manila Central University	UCAL (Note: UAAP member school from 1952–62.)	–	0	–	0	–	–	–	None
Saint Vincent de Paul	– (Note: NCAA member school from 1925–26.)	0	–	–	0	–	–	–	None
Trinity University of Asia	UCAL (Note: NCAA member school from 1974–86.)	0	–	–	0	–	–	–	None
University of Manila	– (Note: NCAA member school from 1924–26 and UAAP member school from 1952–54.)	0	0	–	0	–	–	–	None
