= List of Philippine college team nicknames =

This is an incomplete list of Philippine college team nicknames:

== Team nicknames ==
=== A ===
| Institution | Nickname |
|---|---|
| Adamson University | Adamson Soaring Falcons |
| AISAT College - Dasmariñas | AISAT Forest Falcons / AISAT Royal Falcons |
| Asian Institute of Maritime Studies | AIMS Blue Sharks |
| AMA University | AMA Kings |
| Angeles University Foundation | AUF Great Danes |
| Angelicum College | Angelicum Roebucks |
| Araullo University | AU Firebirds |
| Arellano University | Arellano Chiefs |
| Asia Pacific College | APC Rams |
| Asian College of Science and Technology | ACSAT Lightnings |
| Asian College of Technology | ACT Cyber Knights |
| Ateneo de Manila University | Ateneo Blue Eagles |
| Ateneo de Zamboanga University | Ateneo Blue Eagles / Azul Aguilas |
| Ateneo de Davao University | Ateneo Blue Knights |
| Ateneo de Naga University | Ateneo Golden Knights |
| Ateneo de Cagayan - Xavier University | Blue Crusaders |

=== B ===
| Institution | Nickname |
|---|---|
| Baguio Central University | BCU Eagles |
| Baliuag University | BU Hornets |
| Batangas State University | BSU Red Spartans |
| Bataan Peninsula State University | BPSU Stallions |
| Bestlink College of the Philippines | BCP Kalasag |
| Benedicto College | BC Cheetahs |
| Benguet State University | BSU Wildcats |
| Bicol Institute of Technology | Bicol Tech Super Cruisers |
| Bukidnon State University | BSU Wildcats |
| Bulacan State University | BulSU Gold Gears |

=== C ===
| Institution | Nickname |
|---|---|
| Cagayan de Oro College – PHINMA Education Network | COC–PHINMA Scorpions |
| Canossa College of San Pablo | Canossian Saints |
| Capitol University | Capitol Stallions |
| Cavite State University | CvSU Hornets |
| Central Colleges of the Philippines | CCP Bobcats |
| Cebu Doctors' University | CDU White Stallions |
| Cebu Eastern College | CEC Dragons |
| Cebu Institute of Technology–University | CIT-U Wildcats |
| Cebu Technological University (formerly CSCST) | CTU Red Bulldogs |
| Centro Escolar University | CEU Scorpions |
| Central Philippine University | CPU Golden Lions |
| Central Luzon State University | CLSU Green Cobras |
| Chiang Kai Shek College | CKSC Blue Dragons |
| City University of Pasay (formerly Pamantasan ng Lungsod ng Pasay) | Pasay/CUP Eagles |
| Colegio de San Juan de Letran | Letran Knights |
| Colegio de San Lorenzo | San Lorenzo Golden Griffins |
| Computer Communication Development Institute | CCDI Wildcats |
| Cordillera Career Development College | CCDC Admirals |

=== D ===
| Institution | Nickname |
|---|---|
| De La Salle Araneta University | DLSAU Stallions |
| De La Salle-College of Saint Benilde | CSB Blazers |
| De La Salle Medical and Health Sciences Institute | DLSMHSI Crusaders |
| De La Salle Lipa | DLSL Green Stallions |
| De La Salle University (Manila) | DLSU Green Archers |
| De La Salle University-Dasmariñas | DLSU-D Patriots |
| De Ocampo Memorial College | DOMC Cobras |
| Diliman College | Diliman Blue Dragons |
| Dominican College of Santa Rosa (Santa Rosa, Laguna) | Dominican Hounds |
| Don Bosco Technical College (Mandaluyong) | Don Bosco Grey Wolves |
| Don Bosco Technology Center (Cebu) | DBTC Greywolves |

=== E ===
| Institution | Nickname |
|---|---|
| Emilio Aguinaldo College | EAC Generals |
| Emilio Aguinaldo College-Cavite | EAC Vanguard |
| Enderun Colleges | Enderun Titans |
| Eulogio "Amang" Rodriguez Institute of Science and Technology | EARIST Red Foxes |

=== F ===
| Institution | Nickname |
|---|---|
| Far Eastern University | FEU Tamaraws |
| Far Eastern University Institute of Technology | FEU-Tech Cyborg Tamaraws |
| FEATI University | FEATI Seahawks |
| Foundation University | Foundation Greyhounds |
| Far Eastern University Alabang | FEU Apex Tamaraws |
| Franciscan College of the Immaculate Conception | FCIC Heralds |
| First City Providential College | FCPC Royal Eagles |

=== G ===
| Institution | Nickname |
|---|---|
| Golden Gate Colleges | GGC Sentinels |
| Guang Ming College | Guang Ming Flying Dragons |

=== H ===
| Institution | Nickname |
|---|---|
| Holy Angel University | Holy Angel Flyers |
| Holy Cross of Davao College | HCDC Cross Blazers |
| Holy Trinity College of General Santos | HTC Wildcats |

=== I ===
| Institution | Nickname |
|---|---|
| ICCT Colleges Foundation, Inc. | ICCT Blue Dragons |
| Immaculada Concepcion College | ICC Blue Hawks |
| IIH COLLEGE-Novaliches | Mustangs |
| Informatics International | Icons |
| Interface Computer College | Green Knights |

=== J ===
| Institution | Nickname |
|---|---|
| J.H. Cerilles State College | JHCSC Green Hornets |
| Jose Rizal University | JRU Heavy Bombers |

=== L ===
| Institution | Nickname |
|---|---|
| La Consolacion College | LaCo Blue Royals |
| Laguna State Polytechnic University | LSPU Lakers |
| Liceo de Cagayan University | Liceo Titans |
| Lipa City Colleges | Blazing Hawk |
| Lourdes College | Lourdes Blue Sash |
| Lyceum Northwestern University | LNU Dukes |
| Lyceum of Alabang | Lyceum Sharks |
| Lyceum of Subic Bay | LSB Sharks |
| Lyceum of the Philippines University (Manila) | Lyceum Pirates |

=== M ===
| Institution | Nickname |
|---|---|
| Manila Adventist College | MAC Angels |
| Manila Central University | MCU Supremos (formerly Purple Owls and Tigers) |
| Manila Tytana Colleges | MTC Titans |
| Manuel L. Quezon University | MLQU Stallions |
| Mapúa University | Mapúa Cardinals |
| Manuel S. Enverga University Foundation | MSEUF Wildcats |
| Marian College of Baliwag | MCB Fiery Phoenix |
| Metro Manila College | MMC Buffalos |
| Mindanao State University-Iligan Institute of Technology | MSU-IIT Cats |
| Mindanao Aeronautical Technical School College of Technology | MATS Navigators |
| Miriam College | MC Katipuneras |

=== N ===
| Institution | Nickname |
|---|---|
| Naga Colleges Foundation | NCF Tigers |
| National College of Business and Arts | NCBA Wildcats |
| National University | NU Bulldogs |
| New Era University | New Era Hunters |
| Negros Oriental State University | NORSU Tigers |
| Notre Dame of Greater Manila | Notre Dame Fighting Irish |
| Nueva Ecija University of Science and Technology | NEUST Phoenix |

=== O ===
| Institution | Nickname |
|---|---|
| Olivarez College | Olivarez Sea Lions |
| Our Lady of Assumption College-Laguna | OLAC Blue Knights |
| Our Lady of Fatima University | OLFU Phoenix |

=== P ===
| Institution | Nickname |
|---|---|
| Pamantasan ng Cabuyao | PNC Mantis |
| Pamantasan ng Lungsod ng Maynila | PLM Haribons |
| Pamantasan ng Lungsod ng Pasig | PLP Green Warriors |
| Pasig Catholic College | PCC Red Crusaders |
| PATTS College of Aeronautics | PATTS Seahorses |
| Philippine Christian University | PCU Dolphins (formerly Saints) |
| Philippine College of Criminology | PCCr Golden Panthers (formerly Enforcers) |
| Philippine Cultural College | PCC Seagulls |
| Philippine Merchant Marine School | PMMS Mariners |
| Philippine Military Academy | PMA Cavaliers |
| Philippine Normal University | PNU Torch Bearers |
| Philippine School of Business Administration | PSBA Jaguars |
| Philippine State College of Aeronautics | PhilSCA Iron Eagles |
| Philippine Women's University | PWU Patriots |
| Pines City Colleges | PCC Warriors |
| PMI Colleges | PMI Admirals |
| Pampanga State University | PSU Honorians |
| Polytechnic University of the Philippines | PUP Radicals (Formerly Mighty Maroons and Yellow Stars) |

=== Q ===
| Institution | Nickname |
|---|---|
| Quezon City University | QCU Ligers |

=== R ===
| Institution | Nickname |
|---|---|
| Rizal Technological University | RTU Blue Thunder |

=== S ===
| Institution | Nickname |
|---|---|
| Saint Bridget College | SBC Blue Shepherds |
| Saint Clare College of Caloocan | St. Clare Saints |
| Saint Francis of Assisi College System | St. Francis / SFACS Doves |
| Saint Jude College | St. Jude Crusaders |
| Saint Louis University, Baguio City | St. Louis / SLU Navigators |
| St. Louise de Marillac College of Sorsogon, Sorsogon City | SLMCS JAGUARS |
| St. Mary's College Quezon City | SMCQC Blue Ravens |
| St. Paul University Manila | SPU Manila VIPERS |
| St. Scholastica's College | St. Scho / SSC Scions |
| St. Dominic College of Asia | Dominican Pikemen |
| St. Nicolas College of Business and Technology | SNC Hoplites |
| Salazar Colleges of Science and Institute of Technology | Salazar Tech Skyblazers |
| San Beda University | San Beda Red Lions |
| San Beda College - Alabang | San Beda Alabang Red Lions |
| San Sebastian College – Recoletos de Cavite | San Sebastian / SSC-R Cavite Baycats |
| San Sebastian College – Recoletos de Manila | San Sebastian / SSC-R Golden Stags |
| Siena College of Quezon City | Siena Red Lilies |
| Silliman University | Silliman Stallions (Men) / Silliman Mares (Women) |
| Southern Luzon State University | SLSU Phoenix / SLSU Green Rangers |
| Southwestern University–PHINMA | SWU–Phinma Cobras |
| San Pablo Colleges | SPC Ravens (formerly Hermits) |
| San Pedro College of Business Administration | SPCBA Tigers |
| STI College | STI Olympians |
| Systems Plus College Foundation | SPCF Blue Panthers |

=== T ===
| Institution | Nickname |
|---|---|
| Taguig City University | Taguig Red Warriors |
| Tarlac State University | TSU Firefox |
| Tarlac Agricultural University | TAU Buffalos |
| Treston International College | Treston Golden Lions |
| Technological Institute of the Philippines | TIP Engineers (formerly Rangers) |
| Technological University of the Philippines | TUP Grey Hawks |
| Trinity University of Asia | Trinity Stallions (formerly Broncos) |

=== U ===
| Institution | Nickname |
|---|---|
| Universidad de Manila | UDM Merlions |
| Universidad de Zamboanga | UZ Wildcats |
| University of Asia and the Pacific | UA&P Dragons |
| University of the Assumption | UA Blue Pelicans |
| University of Baguio | UB Cardinals |
| University of Batangas | UB Brahmans |
| University of Cebu (formerly Cebu Central Colleges) | UC Webmasters (formerly Mariners, Aguilas, CCC Executives) |
| University of the Cordilleras (formerly Baguio Colleges Foundation) | UC Jaguars (formerly BCF Shields) |
| University of the East | UE Red Warriors |
| University of Iloilo | UI Wildcats |
| University of Luzon (formerly Luzon Colleges) | UL Tigers |
| University of Makati | UMak Hardy Herons (formerly Wizards) |
| University of Manila | UM Hawks (formerly Rams) |
| University of Mindanao | UM Wildcats |
| University of Negros Occidental – Recoletos | UNO-R Rams |
| University of Northern Mindanao | UNM Scorpions |
| University of Northern Philippines | UNP Sharks |
| University of Nueva Caceres | UNC Greyhounds |
| University of Pangasinan, Dagupan City | UoP Webczars |
| University of Perpetual Help System DALTA | UPHSD Altas |
| University of Perpetual Help System JONELTA | UPHSJ Saints |
| University of the Philippines Diliman | UP Fighting Maroons |
| University of San Agustin | USA Golden Eagles |
| University of San Carlos | USC Warriors |
| University of San Jose – Recoletos | USJ-R Jaguars |
| University of Saint La Salle | USLS Stingers |
| University of Santo Tomas | UST Growling Tigers (formerly Glowing Goldies) |
| University of Southern Philippines Foundation | USPF Black Panthers |
| University of the Visayas | UV Green Lancers |
| University of Southeastern Philippines | USeP Falcons |

=== V ===
| Institution | Nickname |
|---|---|
| Velez College | Velez Cougars |
| Visayas State University | VSU Pythons |

=== W ===
| Institution | Nickname |
|---|---|
| STI West Negros University | STI WNU Mustangs |
| Wesleyan University | Wesleyan Green Knights |
| Western Mindanao State University | WMSU Fighting Crimson |
| World Citi Colleges | WCC Vikings |
| WCC Aeronautical & Technological College | WCC Skyhawks |

== See also ==
- College basketball in the Philippines
- List of Philippine men's collegiate basketball champions
