= College basketball in the Philippines =

College basketball in the Philippines is fragmented; as of today there is no single governing body, with several leagues in Metro Manila and in the provinces. The University Athletic Association of the Philippines and National Collegiate Athletic Association (Philippines) champions are considered to be the major champions, although several other leagues, claim their champions in equal standing with those of the UAAP and the NCAA.

Furthermore, the NCAA and the UAAP were not members of the embattled Basketball Association of the Philippines, the then FIBA-recognized national basketball federation, although other leagues are members. Only in 2007 were the leagues included in the new national federation, the Samahang Basketbol ng Pilipinas.

In 2008, the Samahang Basketbol ng Pilipinas sanctioned the Philippine Collegiate Champions League, a tournament originally known as the "Collegiate Championship League" (CCL) since 2002, as the country's collegiate men's national basketball champion. This league will work together with the different collegiate basketball leagues (UAAP, NCAA, etc.) in the implementation of this tournament.

== Tournament formats ==
Most collegiate leagues now have the same basic format, introduced by the UAAP with success in 1994 (implemented on 1995) that has now been emulated by majority of the collegiate leagues with 8 members or less:

- Double round eliminations
- Top four advances to the semifinals
- Top two seeds have the "twice-to-beat advantage," wherein they only need to beat their opponents once while their adversaries needs to win twice (diagram A).
- The finals are in a best of three series format.

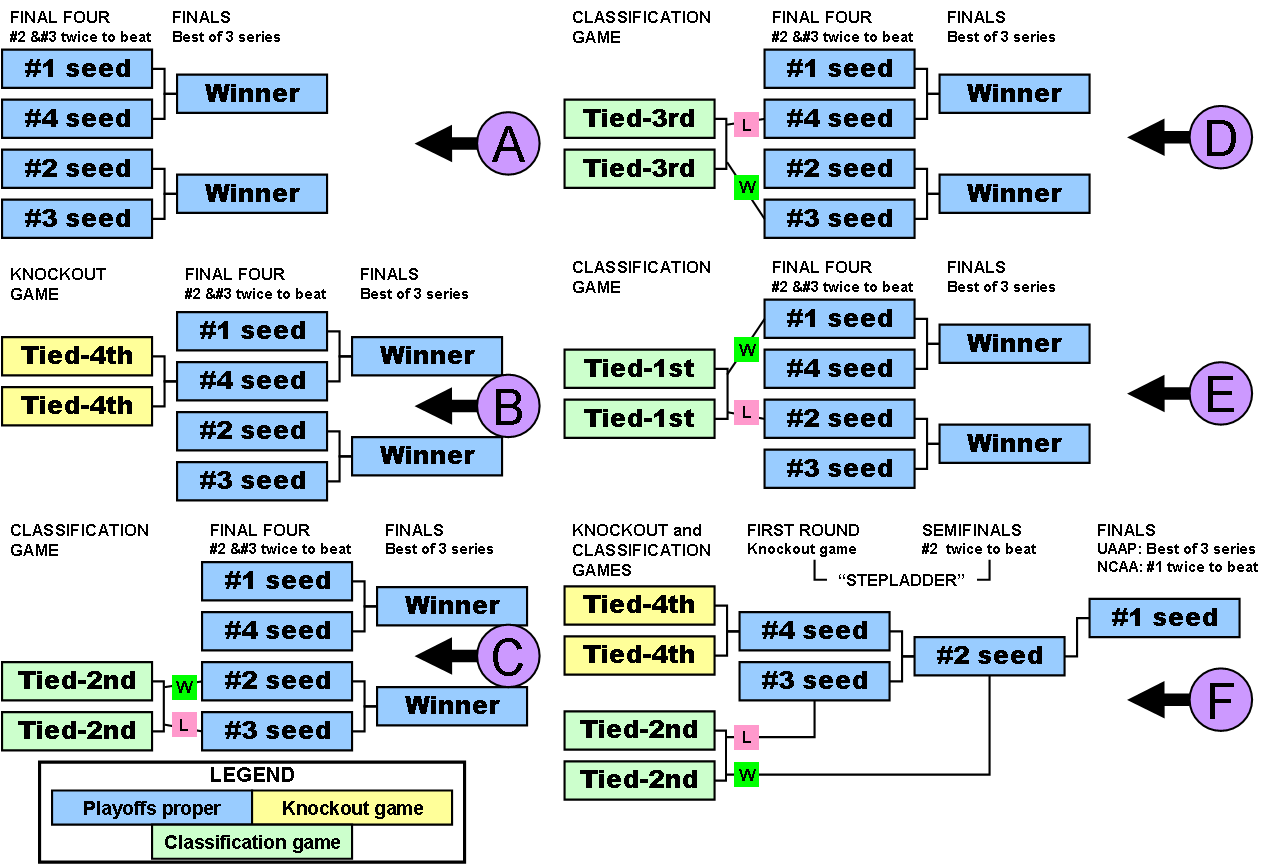

- Ties are broken by holding an extra game or via points difference.
  - If ties are broken by holding an extra game, it may have interesting implications:
    - For the #1 seed (diagram E), the winner may face a "weaker" opponent in the semifinals, although the loser will still have the twice to beat advantage.
    - For the #2 seed (diagram C), the competing teams will still face each other in the semifinals, thereby technically they're playing a best-of-3 series.
    - For the #3 seed (diagram D), the winner may face a "weaker" opponent in the semifinals, although they'll still have to win twice against their semifinal opponents in order for them to progress. Note that this is not played at all times, and leagues would rather use the points difference tiebreaker.
    - For the #4 seed (diagram B), it will be a knockout game, therefore the loser will be eliminated; the winner still has to win twice against their semifinal opponents in order for them to progress.
- In most leagues, if a team sweeps the elimination round, the team will either be automatic champions, progress automatically to the finals (diagram F), or would have to go through the usual playoff format.
  - If the sweeping team progresses to the finals, their opponents would either have to win twice consecutively (the twice to beat advantage, used in the NCAA) or a best of 3 series will be used (used in the UAAP).
  - Breaking ties are also critical in when the swept team advances outright to the finals (diagram F):
    - For the #2 seed, the loser will have to go through a knockout game against the #4 seed, while the winner will have twice to beat advantage.
    - For the #4 seed, it is basically the same scenario when no team swept the eliminations, but the #4 team has to win 4 consecutive times against 3 different teams in order to advance to the finals.
    - The first-round knockout game and the semifinal stages is collectively known as the "stepladder series".
- In 2023, the NCAA added a battle-for-third beginning with Season 99, which is contested between the two losing teams in the semifinals.
- League champions do not face each other U.S. NCAA style to determine one national champion, although several off-season tournaments exist, such as the Filoil EcoOil Preseason Cup, that are contested by teams from multiple associations.

=== Examples ===
- Diagram B: NCAA Season 80 seniors' playoffs - San Beda defeated Mapua for fourth and forced an extra game against UPHDS in the semifinals before being eliminated.
- Diagram C: UAAP Season 67 men's playoffs - La Salle defeated Ateneo in the 2nd seed game to gain the twice-to-beat advantage; La Salle beat Ateneo again at the semifinals en route to the championship (although La Salle has forfeited their 2004 championship in 2006 after 2 players were found to have used fraudulent papers)
- Diagram D: UAAP Season 69 men's playoffs - UST defeated Adamson to face #2 UE; Adamson was eliminated in the first game by #1 Ateneo, while #3 UST upset UE en route to the championship
- Diagram E: UAAP Season 62 men's playoffs - La Salle defeated UST in the 1st seed game 84-79. Both La Salle and UST breezed through their semifinal opponents as La Salle held on to win the finals after 3 games.
- Diagram F: UAAP Season 70 men's playoffs - UE's sweep in the eliminations gave them an outright finals berth, bypassing the semifinals where they've always been beaten since its inception. La Salle defeated Ateneo on the 2nd seed game, which defeated UST on the first round which had qualified by beating FEU on the 4th seed game. La Salle needed their twice to beat advantage to eliminate Ateneo in the semifinal.

== List of collegiate leagues and tournaments ==
=== Metro Manila-based leagues ===
- Inter-Scholastic Athletic Association
- Men's National Collegiate Athletic Association
- National Athletic Association of Schools, Colleges and Universities
- National Capital Region Athletic Association
- National Collegiate Athletic Association (Philippines) - details
- National Collegiate Athletic Association (Philippines) South
- State Colleges and Universities Athletic Association
- Universities and Colleges Athletic Association
- Universities and Colleges Athletic League
- Universities and Colleges of Luzon Athletic Association
- University Athletic Association of the Philippines - details
- Women's National Collegiate Athletic Association

=== Provincial leagues ===
- Bicol Universities and Colleges Athletic League
- Bohol Schools Athletic Association, Inc.
- Bulacan Universities and Colleges Athletic Association
- Baguio Benguet Educational Athletic League
- Cagayan de Oro Schools Athletic Association
- Cebu Schools Athletic Foundation, Inc.
- Davao Schools Athletic Foundation, Inc.
- Iloilo Schools Sports Association
- Negros Occidental Private Schools Sports, Cultural and Educational Association
- Nueva Ecija Colleges and Universities Athletic Association
- United Collegiate Championship League
- United Central Luzon Athletic Association
- Universities and Colleges Association of Pangasinan

==== Defunct leagues ====
- Philippine Collegiate Champions League
- Colleges and Universities Sports Association

=== Off-season tournaments ===
- Filoil EcoOil Preseason Cup
- Pinoyliga Collegiate Cup

==== Defunct off-season tournaments ====
- Homegrown Cup
- Nike Summer League
- Father Martin Cup

== Metro Manila teams ==
Locations of schools with sports programs within Metro Manila per league: Red-UAAP, blue-NCAA, green-NAASCU, orange-UCAA,
Not shown: EAC-ICA, LPU-Cavite, SBC-R, DLSU-D

== See also ==
- College basketball (in the United States)
- Philippine Men's Collegiate Basketball Champions
- List of Philippine college team nicknames
