= Francis Lopez (basketball) =

Filipino basketball player (born 2003)

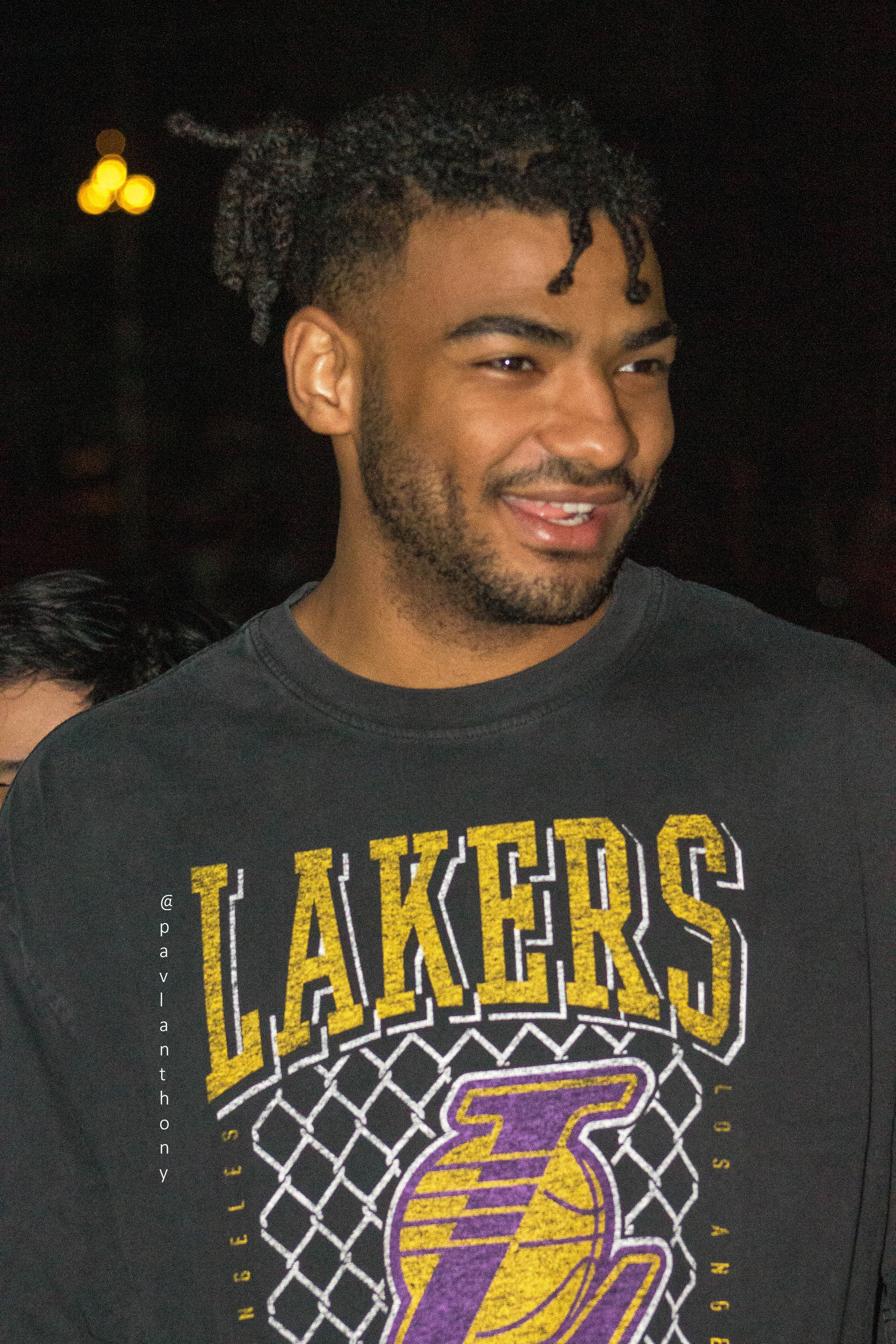
- Lopez during the UAAP Season 87 in 2024

No. 20 – Fighting Eagles Nagoya
- Position: Small forward
- League: B.League

Personal information
- Born: May 17, 2003 (age 23)
- Listed height: 6 ft 4 in (193 cm)
- Listed weight: 194 lb (88 kg)

Career information
- High school: Augustinian Abbey School (Las Piñas); La Salle Green Hills (Mandaluyong); Ateneo (Quezon City)
- College: UP (2023–2024)

Career history
- 2025–present: Fighting Eagles Nagoya

Career highlights
- UAAP champion (2024); UAAP Rookie of the Year (2023); Filoil EcoOil Preseason Cup champion (2024); Filoil EcoOil Preseason Cup Mythical Five (2024)

Francis Leo S. "Lebron" Lopez (born May 17, 2003) is a Filipino-Angolan professional basketball player for the Fighting Eagles Nagoya of the Japanese B.League. After breaking out in the Philippine high school basketball scene, he was set to play in the Overtime Elite (OTE) league, but due to visa issues, never got to play there. Instead, he committed to play for UP where he won the Rookie of the Year in UAAP Season 86 and was part of the UP team that won the UAAP Season 87 championship.

In 2025, he turned pro, beginning his professional career in Japan.

== High school career ==
Lopez first played varsity basketball for Augustinian Abbey School (AAS) at 13 years old. He also continued growing in height, from 5'3" when he 10 years old, to 6'3" at 13 years of age. He then gained significant attention after starring for Las Piñas in the 2018 edition of NCR Palaro, an annual sporting competition for youth from all over Metro Manila, where they just missed the medal rounds.

=== La Salle Green Hills ===
LSGH assistant coach and scout Anton Brodett recruited Lopez to play for La Salle Green Hills (LSGH) after seeing him play in a neighborhood basketball court in Las Piñas. However, he averaged 2.3 points and 1.3 rebounds in 3.4 minutes, seeing action in only 10 of their 22 games in all. He was also set to play in the NCAA Season 94 Shooting Stars competition, but didn't get to compete and was replaced by Sebastian Locsin. LSGH went on to finish as runner-ups to Mapúa for Season 94.

=== Ateneo de Manila ===
After Season 94, LSGH underwent changes in management. That, and talks with Ateneo assistant coach Ford Arao, prompted Lopez to transfer to Ateneo de Manila.

Lopez debuted in Season 82 with 14 points and seven rebounds in a win over the Adamson Baby Falcons. In their first loss of the season, which was against the FEU Baby Tamaraws, he had 18 points, 14 boards, and five blocks. Ateneo bounced back with a win over the UPIS Junior Maroons, in which he had 20 points and three blocks. He then had a double-double of 17 points and 18 rebounds over the UST Tiger Cubs. At the end of the first round of eliminations, he was fifth in the MVP race as Ateneo had a record of 4–3. Against the NSNU Bullpups, he had 17 points, nine rebounds, and five blocks, but missed a go-ahead dunk that eventually led to a close loss. At the end of eliminations, he was third in the MVP race as Ateneo went on to clinch the 3rd seed. However, they lost in the first round of the playoffs to Adamson. He was awarded a spot on the UAAP Juniors Mythical Team at the end of the season, and finished with averages of 16.0 points on 45% shooting, 9.2 rebounds and 3.0 blocks.

In 2020, Lopez made it to the NBTC 24, a list of the top high school basketball players in the country. He was named among the 2020 SLAM Philippines Rising Stars. Two years later, he got to play in the SLAM Rising Stars Classic.

Lopez did not graduate from Ateneo, opting to pursue a professional basketball career.

== Failed stint with Overtime Elite ==
On July 13, 2021, Lopez opted to leave Ateneo and signed with the Overtime Elite basketball league. However, he never got to join the league, as his visa was constantly rejected by the US Citizenship and Immigration Services (USCIS). He only received $25,000 of his $100,000 deal but it was supposedly only for the use of his image and likeness in the promotional materials of OTE. He then spent time with the Philippines' men's national team and attempted to play for the Illawarra Hawks in the NBL, but due to his Filipino-Angolan heritage, did not qualify as an Asian import.

== College career ==
=== UP Fighting Maroons ===
For the next phase of his basketball career, it was expected that Lopez would either play overseas or play for the Ateneo Blue Eagles. On January 21, 2023, on the night Ateneo was celebrating its Season 85 basketball championship with a bonfire, it was reported that Lopez had committed to playing for the UP Fighting Maroons. Aside from his family and friends, he also credited UP star player and Gilas teammate Carl Tamayo for helping him in his decision. His former agency also released a letter saying that since he didn't attain a US visa, his contract with them is considered void ab initio (void from start), clarifying eligibility concerns. On September 27, 2023, the UAAP board officially cleared him to play for UP.

==== Season 86: Rookie of the Year ====
Lopez made his debut in Season 86 in a win over the Adamson Soaring Falcons, in which he only scored five points, but grabbed 13 rebounds. In a win over the NU Bulldogs, he scored 14 points, seven rebounds, four assists, two steals, and a block. In a 31-point win over the UST Growling Tigers, he had 11 points and four assists. Against Ateneo, he tweaked his ankle. He was able to play the following game, and had 11 points and seven rebounds in a rematch against Adamson. In a win over the FEU Tamaraws, he had a near double-double with 12 points, nine rebounds, and four assists. The Maroons got the first seed that season. In the Final Four, UP beat Ateneo, making a return to the finals. In Game 1 of the finals against the DLSU Green Archers, he led the team with 15 points and 11 rebounds to a 30-point win. He played in that game despite having low sugar, and had to wear an armband that monitored his sugar levels. For Game 2, he dealt with flu, and had to take in IV fluids and meds before the game. La Salle extended the series and beat UP in Game 3 to win the championship. He won the Rookie of the Year award, becoming the sixth Maroon to win the award after Eric Altamirano (1983), Woody Co (2006), Kyles Lao (2013), Juan Gómez de Liaño (2017), and Carl Tamayo (2021).

==== Season 87: Championship with UP ====
In the preseason, Lopez helped UP defend its FilOil EcoOil Preseason Cup. To start UAAP Season 87, he had 14 points, six rebounds, and three assists in a win over Ateneo. He then had 20 points, seven rebounds, and two assists in a win over UST. He scored 20 points again in a rematch against Ateneo. Against DLSU, he had seven rebounds and two assists, but was limited to six points as he struggled with foul trouble all game and UP lost that game. Once again, UP made the finals for the fourth season in a row, with DLSU facing them once again.

In Game 1 of the finals, Lopez contributed 13 points, six rebounds, and four blocks as they got the win. However, in Game 2, he missed four free throws and had a pair of turnovers in the clutch as DLSU went on a 10–2 run to claim a one-point win, tying the series. In Game 3, the struggles continued, as he had nine turnovers throughout the game. Despite this, he was able to hit a clutch three-pointer to give UP a four-point lead with 1:12 remaining in the game. UP hung on to win 66–62, and claim its second title in four seasons. He finished the game with 12 points, 11 rebounds, six assists, a steal and a block. This was his first major championship, as he had never won a title in high school and only had a silver medal from his time with the national team.

== Professional career ==
=== Fighting Eagles Nagoya (2025–present) ===
On April 28, 2025, it was announced that Lopez would be leaving the Maroons and heading to the Japanese B.League to play for the Fighting Eagles Nagoya, foregoing his three remaining seasons with UP. He competed in the dunk contest during the B.League's All-Star Weekend.

== National team career ==
=== Junior national team ===
In 2019, Lopez was named to the Gilas U-19 team for the 2019 FIBA Under-16 Asian Championship.

=== Senior national team ===
In 2021, Lopez made his senior national team debut against Indonesia in the third window of the 2022 Fiba Asia Cup qualifiers. He contributed eight points and five rebounds in just nine minutes as Gilas beat Indonesia. That year, he was the final cut of the team before Gilas competed in the Olympic Qualifying Tournament.

In 2022, Lopez joined Gilas Pilipinas for that year's Southeast Asian Games. On his 19th birthday, he had 17 points, five rebounds, two blocks, and a plus-minus rating of 23 in a win over Cambodia. He followed it up with 18 points on 7-for-7 in a win over Malaysia. They were on the verge of sweeping the tournament until they lost to Indonesia in the finals, settling for a silver medal. Later that year, he played in both the 2023 FIBA World Cup qualifiers and the FIBA Asia Cup.

== Personal life ==
Lopez is Filipino-Angolan. He got his nickname "LeBron" from his family and friends, as he was the tallest in their neighborhood. He also looks up to NBA superstar LeBron James.

Lopez has a collection of Ford Mustang GT and a Ferrari.
