= Deaths of Divine Adili and Rene Baterbonia =

2026 drowning of student-athletes in the Philippines

- Rene Baterbonia being rescued by first responders and fellow student-athletes moments after the drowning incident. Some faces have been blurred out.
- Date: June 8, 2026
- Time: 2:30 pm (PHT)
- Location: Hermanos Leisure Farm and Surf Camp, Dipaculao, Aurora, Philippines; 15°50′43.4″N 121°32′50.1″E
- Type: Team building incident
- Cause: Drowning
- Deaths: Divine Adili (aged 21); Rene Baterbonia (aged 18)

Chukwuemeka Divine Adili and Rene Clert Noja Baterbonia were student-athletes of the Ateneo de Manila University (ADMU)'s Blue Eagles men's basketball team. Adili, a 21-year Nigerian, and Baterbonia, an 18-year-old Filipino, drowned during a training activity at a beach resort in Dipaculao, Aurora, Philippines, on June 8, 2026.

Local police ruled the deaths accidental, stating that there was no foul play involved and that no weights were found on their bodies. Despite the ruling, the incident continued to receive widespread media attention and public scrutiny. The Blue Eagles' head coach, Tab Baldwin, and team manager, Epok Quimpo, resigned from their respective posts.

On June 17, the Criminal Investigation and Detection Group (CIDG) of the Philippine National Police (PNP) said that the deaths were not accidental and began investigating at least seven persons of interest for possible homicide and hazing charges. While a task force of the National Bureau of Investigation has recommended filing complaints with the Department of Justice against Baldwin and other coaches in relation to the deaths, no case has been filed in any court.

The deaths prompted discussions about the safety of student-athletes amid the growing commercialization of the University Athletic Association of the Philippines (UAAP), as well as the alleged shortcomings of the Ateneo coaching staff and administration. The UAAP has since banned Baldwin from all competitions and related activities permanently.

== Backgrounds ==
Chukwuemeka Divine Adili was born on April 14, 2005 in Nigeria to Elias and Ifeoma Joy Adili. He was the eldest of four siblings. Adili moved to the Philippines in 2023 to study at the New Era University (NEU). He helped NEU's junior team win two straight championships at the National Athletic Association of Schools, Colleges and Universities (NAASCU) and was also named two-time NAASCU Most Valuable Player (MVP). He also joined as a center for the Blue Eagles for UAAP Season 88 in 2025. Adili was a sophomore at ADMU at the time of his death.

Rene Clert Noja Baterbonia (Note: In this Filipino name, the middle name or maternal family name is Noja and the surname or paternal family name is Baterbonia.) was born on May 8, 2008 to Rovelyn (née Noja) and Rene Baterbonia Sr. Baterbonia hailed from Talacogon, Agusan del Sur, and pursued his studies in Davao City, where he represented the Blue Knights of the Ateneo de Davao University (AdDU). He was the second of seven siblings and grew up in a very close-knit household. He was named MVP after leading the Davao Region to the 2025 Palarong Pambansa championship. He joined the Ateneo Blue Eagles, which was viewed as a major boost for the team's future. He had also participated in the 2026 Palarong Pambansa two weeks before his death, where he helped secure the team a silver medal. Baterbonia was an incoming freshman at ADMU at the time of his death.

Following the incident, videos surfaced detailing previous team-building activities organized by coach Tab Baldwin. The 2017 iteration has been described as a "boot camp" and done with a "military-style" training by its participants. The 2026 Eagles annual exercise was overseen by Baldwin and a week-long event which was expected to last from June 8 to 14, 2026.

According to the Department of the Interior and Local Government (DILG), information obtained by the Criminal Investigation and Detection Group (CIDG) indicated that the team-building activity was connected to the selection of 17 players for the men's basketball team roster that Baldwin would submit to the board of the University Athletic Association of the Philippines (UAAP); 20 athletes participated in the activity. Blue Eagles interim head coach Louis Alas, who replaced Baldwin following his resignation, told the DILG that the activity was not basketball-specific and was intended to assess the players' physical condition and mental toughness.

== Deaths ==
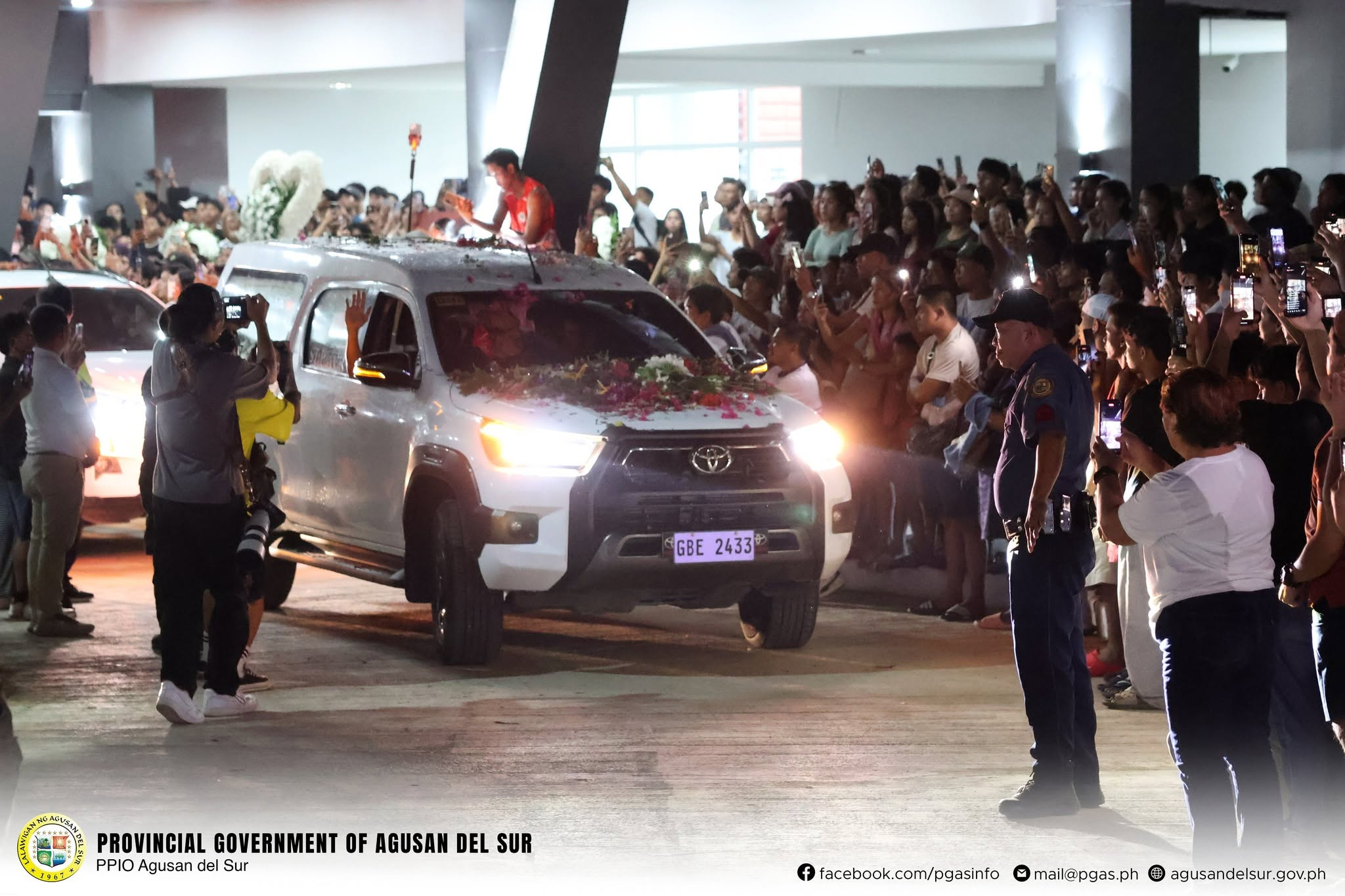
Baterbonia's remains arrive in his home province of Agusan del Sur on June 15, 2026

On June 8, 2026, Adili informed his father, Elias, that he was on his way to Hermanos Leisure Farm and Surf Camp in Barangay Lipit, Dipaculao, Aurora; it was their final conversation.

CIDG director Robert Morico II said the players took part in calisthenics and other beach activities on the morning of June 8 before resting in the afternoon. Morico said that, at around 2:30 p.m. (PHT), the players were brought about 700 meters (0.43 mi) from the resort for a water activity, during which they walked and jogged in the seawater despite having been briefed on strong currents and tides in the area.

Baterbonia and Adili reportedly encountered strong waves and currents during the activity. A resort lifeguard was informed of the incident at around 2:50 p.m. and responded to the area where the players had last been seen, while the incident was reported to the Municipal Disaster Risk Reduction and Management Office (MDRRMO) and referred to the Dipaculao Police Station. Their bodies were found about 40 minutes later, after which cardiopulmonary resuscitation (CPR) was performed before they were brought to Aurora Memorial Hospital in Baler, where they were declared dead on arrival. They were 18 and 21, respectively. In an interview with Pia Hontiveros, ADMU players Sam Reyes and Kieffer Alas gave accounts of the rescue efforts; Reyes said teammates told him Adili still had a pulse when brought to shore and that he was transported to the hospital in a police vehicle after the ambulance carrying Baterbonia had left, while Alas said teammate EJ Kapihe attempted to rescue Adili. Reyes also said Baterbonia was found first after an extended period underwater, that the team's physical therapist performed CPR on him, and that players helped carry him from the water. The MDRRMO publicly released drone footage that captured the retrieval operations.

Baterbonia's wake was held at Arlington Memorial Chapels in Quezon City from June 10 to 11 and at the Ateneo de Davao Senior High School Campus Chapel from June 12 to 14, before his remains were transferred to his home province of Agusan del Sur on June 15. On June 24, his remains were laid to rest at the New Talacogon Public Cemetery in Talacogon, Agusan del Sur.

Adili's family requested that an autopsy be conducted before his remains were flown to Nigeria. On June 21, Adili's remains were repatriated to Nigeria. On June 26, these were finally laid to rest in Umueri, his hometown.

== Investigations ==
The Department of Justice (DOJ) has ordered the National Bureau of Investigation (NBI) to probe the incident. The NBI subsequently organized a task force to investigate the deaths. The Aurora Provincial Police Office confirmed that Baterbonia's cause of death was asphyxia by drowning.

The police said that Adili and Baterbonia had gone 300 meters (0.19 miles) from the resort grounds and asked to leave them alone when the resort owner asserted that it was safe to be there and that a lifeguard was on stand-by. Contrary to rumors circulating online, the witnesses, lifeguards, and responders stated that no ankle weights were worn during the team training. The responders added that the rope attached to Baterbonia's foot was part of a lifebuoy. The police have ruled out foul play at this stage but are investigating whether there was negligence or liability on the part of the coaching staff, the resort, or the school administration.

The Dipaculao local government unit (LGU) stated that neither ADMU nor the team's coaches coordinated the activity with local authorities, and mayor Danilo Tolentino noted that had they been informed, the LGU could have provided safety monitoring and assistance. The municipal tourism office observed that there were no warning signs at the resort regarding dangerous sea conditions, specifically rip currents. While the resort's permits were valid, it lacked Department of Tourism (DOT) accreditation. Additionally, while the resort management had advised the team about sea conditions and safe areas, the team reportedly asked not to be interfered with during their activity.

The Criminal Investigation and Detection Group (CIDG) and Department of Labor and Employment (DOLE) issued separate subpoenas for Blue Eagles head coach Tab Baldwin, with the CIDG also issuing subpoenas for four other members of the Blue Eagles' top management. Interior Secretary Jonvic Remulla said that only ADMU athletics director Em Fernandez appeared before the CIDG. Likewise, Baldwin did not appear before the DOLE and sent his lawyer instead.

At a media conference on June 15, CIDG director Robert Morico II announced that they were investigating possible homicide or hazing charges against at least seven persons of interest connected to the drowning. Morico said the CIDG had begun interviewing the team's coaching staff, players, and former members to establish the circumstances before and after the incident. Via 24 Oras, Pelagio Cuison—legal counsel of Reynaldo Jacinto, one of the Blue Eagles' coaches—dismissed the accusations and asserted that the incidents were entirely accidental and the exercises were not excessive.

In a June 16 interview with Pia Hontiveros, Blue Eagles players Kieffer Alas and Sam Reyes also denied that the exercise was a hazing initiation rite, reiterating that it was merely intended to build rapport among members of the basketball team.

On June 17, Morico said the CIDG did not consider the incident accidental and stated that four Blue Eagles players had drowned during the team-building activity, two of whom survived. Morico also said that the agency would issue another subpoena to Baldwin and other staff members, including a request for drone footage taken during the activity.

That same day, Justice Secretary Fredderick Vida said the DOJ had issued an immigration lookout bulletin order, which directs the Bureau of Immigration to monitor a person's travel, against Baldwin, former team manager Christopher "Epok" Quimpo, and three assistant coaches in connection with the investigation. The order was issued after requests from Baterbonia's family, through their lawyer Israelito Torreon, and the CIDG.

On June 26, the CIDG recommended filing charges for alleged violations of the Anti-Hazing Act of 2018 against Baldwin and ten other members of the Ateneo men's basketball program in connection with the deaths of Adili and Baterbonia. The DOJ said it would evaluate the evidence and determine whether to conduct a preliminary investigation or request further case development from the CIDG. Interior Secretary Jonvic Remulla said investigators were examining whether the team-building and training activities, including alleged forced calisthenics and exposure to weather, fell within the law's definition of hazing.

The CIDG later submitted a supplemental referral to the DOJ recommending the evaluation of additional complaints for homicide and reckless imprudence resulting in homicide against Baldwin and other individuals connected to the team-building activity. The CIDG said the complaints were forwarded for case build-up and evaluation, but did not disclose the basis for the additional allegations while the investigation was ongoing. It also said another person had been added as a respondent in the alleged Anti-Hazing Act violation, without identifying the individual. The DOJ said the supplemental referral would be treated as part of the CIDG's original referral dated on June 26, 2026, which remained under evaluation.

In a transmittal dated July 8, 2026, the NBI's task force recommended filing criminal complaints with the DOJ following its investigation into the deaths. The NBI recommended reckless imprudence resulting in two counts of homicide against Baldwin, as well as the basketball team's assistant coaches, strength and conditioning coaches, and physical therapist. It also recommended simple negligence resulting in two counts of homicide against ADMU athletic director Em Fernandez and the resort personnel. The recommendations followed interviews with ADMU president Roberto Yap, Baldwin, more than 20 current and former Blue Eagles players, coaching and support staff, and the resort's owners and employees. The DOJ said it had consolidated the NBI referral with the CIDG's earlier complaint and would evaluate the evidence before determining how to proceed. No case has been filed in court.

== Reactions ==
=== Government ===
The Philippine National Police warned netizens to refrain from speculating and sharing unverified reports regarding Adili and Baterbonia's deaths. The Nigerian embassy in Manila released a statement following the death of Adili. The Office of the President of the Philippines expressed sympathy to the two players and President Bongbong Marcos called for the investigation of their deaths.

Philippine Sports Commission (PSC) chairperson Patrick Gregorio said the team-building activity was not part of PSC policy and did not reflect standard policies of the University Athletic Association of the Philippines (UAAP), Palarong Pambansa, or national sports associations. The PSC announced ₱250,000 (US$5,076.14) in assistance for Adili's and Baterbonia's families and convened a sports stakeholders' panel with agencies and sports bodies, including the UAAP, Samahang Basketbol ng Pilipinas, the Commission on Higher Education, the Department of Education, and the National Youth Commission, to support investigations and review athlete safety policies, team-building protocols, risk-management practices, emergency response measures, and coaching standards. The PSC also backed House Bill No. 2631, or the proposed Sports Coaching Act, which seeks to establish a national registry, licensing and certification requirements, and continuing professional development rules for coaches and sports professionals.

Several government officials and legislators reacted to the deaths. Vice President Sara Duterte expressed condolences to the families of Adili and Baterbonia and described the incident as unfortunate. She criticized the Ateneo de Manila University's handling of the situation, stating that schools should promptly communicate with and provide support to the families of students who die while under their supervision. Senators Robin Padilla, Bam Aquino, and Bong Go, all of whom visited Baterbonia's wake, filed separate resolutions seeking Senate investigations into the deaths, including reviews of student safety policies, supervision, and safeguards for school-organized off-campus activities and sports programs. Senators Go and JV Ejercito separately filed bills concerning student-athlete safety following the deaths. Ejercito filed Senate Bill No. 2269, or the proposed Student-Athletes Comprehensive Protection Act of 2026, which seeks to amend the Student-Athletes Protection Act by adding rights for student-athletes and duties for schools and athletic associations, including medical assistance, injury response protocols, and safe training environments. Go filed Senate Bill No. 2261, which seeks to establish minimum safety standards for sports-related activities.

In the House of Representatives, Pinoy Workers Partylist representative Karl Legazpi and Navotas representative Toby Tiangco filed resolutions calling for an inquiry into the circumstances of the incident, possible liabilities, and measures to strengthen safety standards and oversight for student-athletes.

=== Ateneo de Manila University ===
On June 11, 2026, the Ateneo de Manila University announced that Baldwin and team manager Epok Quimpo had been placed on leave as the university probed the deaths of the two players.

In a pre-recorded video released by ADMU on June 12, 2026, Baldwin addressed the deaths of Adili and Baterbonia, providing his account of the events that transpired during the team's team-building activity last June 8. He expressed remorse and asked for forgiveness, stating, "I failed as a leader. I felt I had failed as a coach. I certainly felt like I had failed as a friend to Divine and Rene."

On June 14, 2026, the men's basketball team withdrew from the 2026 Filoil EcoOil Preseason Cup, as confirmed by athletic director Emmanuel Fernandez. After continuous discussions, the league's executive committee granted the university's request "out of compassion following the tragic incident." Prior to the incident, ADMU had played one game in which neither Adili nor Baterbonia played in.

On June 15, 2026, Ateneo de Manila University president Roberto Yap apologized to the families of Adili and Baterbonia and said the university acknowledged their grief and anger over the students' deaths. Yap said Ateneo would review its systems and athletic programs, and announced that the university had accepted Baldwin's and Quimpo's resignations from the team as part of its institutional review.

On June 16, a representative from ADMU's Office of College Athletics (OCA) claimed that the OCA had no involvement in organizing the exercise on June 8. The statement was delivered at the school's town hall, reportedly garnering negative reactions from the crowd.

=== Ateneo de Davao University ===
Ateneo de Davao University renamed its Senior High School (Bangkal) campus court into the Rene “Bobet” Baterbonia Covered Courts (RBBCC) to commemorate Baterbonia and also retired his No. 2 jersey. His siblings were also granted scholarships.

=== University Athletic Association of the Philippines ===
The University Athletic Association of the Philippines (UAAP) said it would wait for the official findings of government investigations before deciding on possible sanctions against the Ateneo de Manila University. UAAP executive director Rebo Saguisag said the league had begun internal coordination and information-gathering, and that any formal action would follow due process, include input from the concerned parties, and take into account reports from agencies such as the NBI, the Criminal Investigation and Detection Group, and the DOJ.

On August 7, 2026, the UAAP allowed the Ateneo Blue Eagles to compete in Season 89, but permanently banned head coach Tab Baldwin from all UAAP-related activities, including "entering any UAAP competition venue". The UAAP also suspended team manager Epok Quimpo, the assistant coaches, and the physical therapist indefinitely.

=== Immediate family ===
Baterbonia's mother Rovelyn Baterbonia questioned the "boot camp"-style training for the Blue Eagles. Although the training has been widely cited as one of the reasons for the Blue Eagles' basketball wins, especially from 2017 to 2019, she pointed to previous incidents of other students nearly drowning in water exercises. In a Facebook post written in Cebuano, Rovelyn later criticized Baldwin's apology, stating that she still has not been given the full details of her son's demise.

In a social media post, Adili's father Elias Adili attributed his son's death to "carelessness". Elias and Adili's mother Ifeoma reiterated the accusations of negligence in an interview with 24 Oras Weekend, stating that adequate precautions were not implemented. Ifeoma also claimed that Adili could not swim and questioned whether the players had been asked about their ability to swim prior to the exercise.

At a press conference on June 13, the Baterbonias' legal counsel Israelito Torreon of Torreon and Partners Law Firm announced five of the bereaved families' demands for ADMU, namely:

- Designating a clear point of contact who will directly communicate with the families of Baterbonia and Adili;
- Allowing the teammates, to speak freely on the incident without fear of consequences to scholarships or roster positions;
- Giving a full account of what happened during their stay at the resort, including activities, instructions, warnings, and precautions taken or not taken;
- Acknowledging that the incident happened under ADMU's watch;
- Extending unconditional support to both families.

Baldwin's estranged wife, Efi Baldwin, posted a video on the social media site X, on June 13, 2026, saying that she had repeatedly warned the Ateneo de Manila University about Baldwin's character, stressing that "children are not safe around him", and that she had faced a campaign of silencing and intimidation from the university ever since. Efi Baldwin's daughter Giota retweeted the post and criticized team manager Epok Quimpo for his reaction to Efi's statements at the time. Torreon said at the June 13 conference that this video could be important to the investigation if its authenticity is proven.

=== Media and general public ===
Former ADMU basketball coach Sandy Arespacochaga told reporters that staff and players alike are facing "intense" scrutiny following Adili and Baterbonia's deaths, including threats against the players. He urged the public to allow the players to grieve. Former Blue Eagles players Mike Nieto, Shaun Ildefonso, Anton Asistio, and Shaggy Allmond defended Baldwin's style of training, responding to unverified claims that arose when anecdotes they shared on podcasts resurfaced on social media. In a statement reposted by his former teammates, Allmond expressed sympathy for Adili and Baterbonia but said that their stories were taken out of context, asserting that "there was nothing done to us that would put us in immediate danger."

On June 11, a candlelight vigil was held for Adili and Baterbonia at ADMU's Zen garden, attended by Baldwin in his first public appearance since the players' drowning.

Reportedly, as of June 13, more than 500 faculty members of ADMU signed an open letter to its president Roberto Yap, denouncing the dispassionate tone of the university's official statements and calling for transparency regarding safety protocols as well as "concrete" accountability. More than 2,000 members of the university community, including students and alumni, signed a similar open letter addressed to the institution.

ADMU's media statements were likewise criticized by Philstar Life and Sports Interactive News Philippines (SPIN). The former published an article featuring analyses by communications and crisis management experts, who believed that the university's use of media spins and "cold" corporate language in their statements significantly increased the public's distrust in them. One such expert, Lilet Camara, said that the discourse has now extended beyond Adili and Baterbonia's deaths. She added, "A pattern is a much harder crisis to manage than a single incident. When history is being raised in a crisis, the university should acknowledge it directly[...] and commit to a specific structural review." SPIN's Homer D. Sayson said that ADMU's decision to stay silent "created a terrible impression that the Jesuit school prioritized self-preservation and image protection over transparency".

In an essay published by the Daily Tribune, Star Elamparo questioned the police ruling of the deaths as an accident, arguing that training in the open water with strong currents was an "entirely foreseeable" hazard that the institution had the duty to assess. He also criticized the lack of equipment and lifeguards at the site of the drowning, opining that this may be grounds for reckless endangerment or criminal negligence. He concluded that he hopes the incident will lead to less dangerous training methods for student athletes.

Likewise, anonymous individuals quoted by the South China Morning Post criticized ADMU's perceived negligence. Insiders reportedly linked the safety concerns surrounding student athletes in the country to the growing commercialization of the University Athletic Association of the Philippines. Writing for Davao Today, former congressman Carlos Isagani Zarate wrote, "These deaths force us to look at a sports culture that puts winning and endurance above human life."

Conversely, Lloyd Bautista of The Manila Times condemned what he perceived as conspiracy theories and "appalling" mob mentality from the public in response to the players' deaths. He defended ADMU, saying that the institution's media approach has been "misinterpreted", adding that he believes most members of the school's community will never "abandon" their alma mater.

In a separate piece also for The Manila Times, Daphne Oseña-Paez said that Baterbonia's story especially resonated with many Filipinos because he was from the province and recruited to play basketball for an "elite" institution in Manila. She observed that his death "brought back feelings of injustice, inequitableness and favoritism" among the general populace, and deepened social, cultural, and political divides in the country.

== See also ==
- History of the Ateneo de Manila
- List of accidents involving sports teams
