= Father Martin Cup =

The Father Edgar Martin Basketball Invitational Tournament, better known as the Fr. Martin Cup, is a pre-season collegiate basketball tournament in the Philippines. It gathers teams from various collegiate leagues, including the UAAP and NCAA, in a basketball tournament just before the start of the collegiate season. It was named after Fr. Edgar Martin, S.J., the former athletic moderator at the Ateneo de Manila University, and former Secretary-General of the Basketball Association of the Philippines. The tournament was established in 1994.

== Tournament format ==
Its format consists of dividing the teams into 2 groups featuring single round robin elimination games among teams of the same group to determine the playoff teams. The playoffs feature a crossover format, with the top seeds of each group facing off against the 4th seed of their opposites, and the 2nd seeds slugging it out with the opposite side’s 3rd seeds, until a champion is determined.

== Championship results ==
Year	Tournament	Seniors' division		Juniors' division		Reference
Year	Tournament	Champion	Runner-up	Champion	Runner-up	Reference
2019	Summer	Far Eastern University	Adamson University	Arellano University	San Beda College–Rizal	
2018–19	Open	National University	San Beda University	–	–	
2018	Division 2	Diliman College	Colegio de San Juan de Letran	First City Providential College	La Consolacion College Manila	
2018	Summer	San Beda University	Colegio de San Juan de Letran	Adamson University	San Beda College–Rizal	
2017–18	Open	Adamson University	San Beda University	–	–	
2017	Division 2	Diliman College	San Beda College	National University	Manila Patriotic School	
2017	Summer	Diliman College	Centro Escolar University	San Sebastian College–Recoletos	Colegio de San Juan de Letran	
2016–17	Open	–	–	–	–	
2016	Division 2	San Beda College	University of the Philippines Diliman	Chiang Kai-shek College	National University	
2016	Summer	Arellano University	Adamson University	National University	Adamson University	
2015–16	Open	Arellano University	University of Perpetual Help System DALTA	–	–	
2015	Division 2	Ateneo de Manila University	Arellano University	Infant Jesus Academy Deltas of Pampanga	Manila Patriotic School	
2015	Summer	José Rizal University	University of Santo Tomas	National University	San Beda College–Rizal	
2014–15	Open	University of Perpetual Help System DALTA	Arellano University	–	–	
2014	Division 2	Mapúa Institute of Technology	Enderun Colleges	Adamson University	Arellano University	
2014	Summer	University of Perpetual Help System DALTA	University of Santo Tomas	Adamson University	San Beda College–Rizal	
2013–14	Open	De La Salle–College of Saint Benilde	University of Perpetual Help System DALTA	–	–	–
2013	Division 2	Ateneo de Manila University	San Beda College	Hope Christian High School	Adamson University	-
2013	Summer	National University	University of Perpetual Help System DALTA	San Beda College–Rizal	Colegio de San Juan de Letran	–
2012–13	Open	San Beda College	De La Salle–College of Saint Benilde	–	–	–
2012	Division 2	University of the East	San Sebastian College–Recoletos	Hope Christian High School	Chiang Kai-shek College	–
2012	Summer	Ateneo de Manila University	José Rizal University	San Beda College–Rizal	Ateneo de Manila University	–
2011–12	Open	San Beda College	Arellano University	–	–	
2011	Division 2	San Beda College	Adamson University	Xavier School	Arellano University	–
2011	Summer	National University	Mapúa Institute of Technology	Hope Christian High School	San Beda College–Rizal	
2010–11	Open	San Beda College	José Rizal University	–	–	
2010	Division 2	National University	De La Salle University	Hope Christian High School	San Beda College	
2010	Summer	Ateneo de Manila University	Mapúa Institute of Technology	Ateneo de Manila University	Arellano University	
2009–10	Open	San Beda College	José Rizal University	–	–	
2009	Division 2	Arellano University	Far Eastern University	Far Eastern University–Diliman	De La Salle Zobel	
2009	Summer	Arellano University	Philippine Merchant Marine School	San Beda College–Rizal	Ateneo de Manila University	
2008–09	Open	Far Eastern University	San Sebastian College–Recoletos	–	–	
2008	Division 2	Arellano University	Far Eastern University	Colegio de San Juan de Letran	San Beda College–Rizal	
2008	Summer	Arellano University	Colegio de San Juan de Letran	Colegio de San Juan de Letran	San Sebastian College–Recoletos	
2007–08	Open	University of the East	San Sebastian College–Recoletos	–	–	
2007	Division 2	San Beda College	Far Eastern University	San Beda College–Rizal	Antipolo Lady of Lourdes School	
2007	Summer	Arellano University	José Rizal University	–	–	
2006–07	Open	San Beda College	Ateneo de Manila University	–	–	
2006	Division 2	Far Eastern University	Ateneo de Manila University	De La Salle Zobel	San Beda College–Rizal	
2006	Summer	University of the East	San Sebastian College–Recoletos	San Sebastian College–Recoletos	San Beda College–Rizal	
2005–06	Open	Ateneo de Manila University	San Beda College	–	–	

Denotes school won both juniors' and seniors' championship in the same tournament.

== See also ==
- College basketball in the Philippines
- List of Philippine men's collegiate basketball champions
