= 2024 Filoil EcoOil Preseason Cup =

17th preseason collegiate basketball tournament organized by Filoil EcoOil Sports

17th Filoil EcoOil ECJ Preseason Cup

Tournament details
- Country: Philippines
- City: San Juan
- Venue(s): Filoil EcoOil Centre
- Dates: May 11 – June 12, 2024
- Teams: 18
- Defending champions: UP Fighting Maroons

Final positions
- Champions: UP Fighting Maroons (2nd title)
- Runners-up: De La Salle Green Archers
- Third place: FEU Tamaraws
- Fourth place: Letran Knights

The 2024 Filoil EcoOil Preseason Cup, officially referred to as the 17th Filoil EcoOil ECJ Preseason Cup, was the seventeenth edition of the collegiate basketball tournament organized by Filoil EcoOil Sports. The tournament began on May 11, 2024 and is contested by all 18 teams from the University Athletic Association of the Philippines (UAAP) and the National Collegiate Athletic Association (NCAA). The tournament concluded on June 12, 2024. All games are held at the Filoil EcoOil Centre in San Juan.

On May 10, 2024, Filoil EcoOil Sports announced that the 17th Preseason Cup would be named after late sports patron Eduardo Cojuangco Jr. The trophy in which the eventual champions will receive is also renamed as the ECJ Cup.

The UP Fighting Maroons enter this tournament as the defending Preseason Cup champions. UP would then go on in successfully defend their title in the championship game after defeating the De La Salle Green Archers in a 69–66 come-from-behind win.

== Elimination round ==
In the elimination round, the teams are grouped by association. From there, the teams play in a single round-robin tournament. UAAP teams will play seven games while NCAA teams play nine. Teams are ranked by win-loss records with the top four teams from each association group advancing to the playoffs.

=== UAAP group ===
==== Team standings ====
| Pos | Team | Pld | W | L | PF | PA | PD | PCT | GB |
|---|---|---|---|---|---|---|---|---|---|
| 1 | UP Fighting Maroons | 7 | 7 | 0 | 554 | 478 | +76 | 1.000 | — |
| 2 | De La Salle Green Archers | 7 | 5 | 2 | 533 | 524 | +9 | .714 | 2 |
| 3 | FEU Tamaraws | 7 | 4 | 3 | 441 | 456 | −15 | .571 (Note: FEU wins tiebreaker over UE by head-to-head victory (80–76).) | 3 |
| 4 | UE Red Warriors | 7 | 4 | 3 | 487 | 471 | +16 | .571 | 3 |
| 5 | UST Growling Tigers | 7 | 3 | 4 | 391 | 391 | 0 | .429 (Note: UST wins tiebreaker over NU by head-to-head victory (76–75).) | 4 |
| 6 | NU Bulldogs | 7 | 3 | 4 | 493 | 453 | +40 | .429 | 4 |
| 7 | Adamson Soaring Falcons | 7 | 2 | 5 | 414 | 460 | −46 | .286 | 5 |
| 8 | Ateneo Blue Eagles | 7 | 0 | 7 | 419 | 509 | −90 | .000 | 7 |

Source: Standings

==== Results ====
| Team | Game | | | | | | |
| Team | 1 | 2 | 3 | 4 | 5 | 6 | 7 |
|---|---|---|---|---|---|---|---|
| Adamson Soaring Falcons (AdU) | UE; 57–65 | FEU; 67–77 | DLSU; 72–80 | ADMU; 61–59 | NU; 57–53 | UP; 46–68 | UST; 54–58 |
| Ateneo Blue Eagles (ADMU) | AdU; 59–61 | UST; 52–63 | NU; 64–66 | FEU; 46–65 | UP; 75–82 | DLSU; 61–98 | UE; 62–74 |
| De La Salle Green Archers (DLSU) | UP; 77–89 | UST; 68–61 | AdU; 80–72 | UE; 77–74 | ADMU; 98–61 | FEU; 81–76 | NU; 52–81 |
| FEU Tamaraws (FEU) | AdU; 77–67 | UE; 80–76 | UP; 84–95 | ADMU; 65–46 | NU; 59–91 | DLSU; 76–81 | UST; 79–72 |
| NU Bulldogs (NU) | UE; 64–72 | UST; 75–76 | UP; 63–73 | ADMU; 66–64 | AdU; 53–57 | FEU; 91–59 | DLSU; 81–52 |
| UE Red Warriors (UE) | AdU; 65–57 | FEU; 76–80 | NU; 72–64 | UP; 60–71 | DLSU; 74–77 | UST; 66–60 | ADMU; 74–62 |
| UP Fighting Maroons (UP) | DLSU; 89–77 | UST; 76–73 | UE; 71–60 | NU; 73–63 | FEU; 95–84 | ADMU; 82–75 | AdU; 68–46 |
| UST Growling Tigers (UST) | DLSU; 61–68 | UP; 73–76 | NU; 76–75 | ADMU; 63–52 | UE; 60–66 | AdU; 58–54 | FEU; 72–79 |

Source: Schedule
Legend: Blue = win; Red = loss

=== NCAA group ===
==== Team standings ====
| Pos | Team | Pld | W | L | PF | PA | PD | PCT | GB |
|---|---|---|---|---|---|---|---|---|---|
| 1 | Letran Knights | 9 | 7 | 2 | 718 | 703 | +15 | .778 (Note: Letran wins tiebreaker over Benilde by head-to-head victory (80–71).) | — |
| 2 | Benilde Blazers | 9 | 7 | 2 | 700 | 646 | +54 | .778 | — |
| 3 | San Beda Red Lions | 9 | 6 | 3 | 652 | 589 | +63 | .667 | 1 |
| 4 | Mapúa Cardinals | 9 | 5 | 4 | 686 | 686 | 0 | .556 (Note: Mapúa wins tiebreaker over EAC by head-to-head victory (75–71).) | 2 |
| 5 | EAC Generals | 9 | 5 | 4 | 688 | 670 | +18 | .556 | 2 |
| 6 | Perpetual Altas | 9 | 4 | 5 | 621 | 655 | −34 | .444 | 3 |
| 7 | Lyceum Pirates | 9 | 3 | 6 | 717 | 747 | −30 | .333 (Note: Lyceum (2–0), Arellano (1–1), and San Sebastian (0–2) are ranked by head-to-head record.) | 4 |
| 8 | Arellano Chiefs | 9 | 3 | 6 | 686 | 711 | −25 | .333 | 4 |
| 9 | San Sebastian Stags | 9 | 3 | 6 | 730 | 774 | −44 | .333 | 4 |
| 10 | JRU Heavy Bombers | 9 | 2 | 7 | 703 | 720 | −17 | .222 | 5 |

Updated to match(es) played on June 6, 2024. Source: Standings

==== Results ====
| Team | Game | | | | | | | | |
| Team | 1 | 2 | 3 | 4 | 5 | 6 | 7 | 8 | 9 |
|---|---|---|---|---|---|---|---|---|---|
| Arellano Chiefs (AU) | JRU; 80–79 | SSC–R; 105–95 | EAC; 77–80 | UPHSD; 68–65 | CSJL; 75–80 | CSB; 58–72 | LPU; 82–88 | MU; 71–79 | SBU; 70–73 |
| Letran Knights (CSJL) | SBU; 69–76 | UPHSD; 69–77 | CSB; 80–71 | LPU; 91–86 | AU; 80–75 | JRU; 68–66 | SSC–R; 81–79 | MU; 96–92 | EAC; 84–81 |
| Benilde Blazers (CSB) | CSJL; 71–80 | MU; 72–59 | SSC–R; 86–64 | JRU; 86–80 | AU; 72–58 | SBU; 71–69 | LPU; 95–89 | UPHSD; 77–72 | EAC; 70–75 |
| EAC Generals (EAC) | SBU; 76–67 | UPHSD; 60–49 | AU; 80–77 | JRU; 66–73 | LPU; 93–81 | MU; 71–75 | SSC–R; 86–94 | CSJL; 81–84 | CSB; 75–70 |
| JRU Heavy Bombers (JRU) | UPHSD; 89–91 | AU; 79–80 | EAC; 73–66 | CSB; 80–86 | CSJL; 66–68 | MU; 89–93 | SBU; 62–75 | SSC–R; 95–87 | LPU; 70–74 |
| Lyceum Pirates (LPU) | MU; 67–75 | SBU; 66–76 | SSC–R; 94–89 | CSJL; 86–91 | EAC; 81–93 | UPHSD; 72–76 | AU; 88–82 | CSB; 89–95 | JRU; 74–70 |
| Mapúa Cardinals (MU) | LPU; 75–67 | UPHSD; 67–76 | CSB; 59–72 | SBU; 67–64 | SSC–R; 79–80 | EAC; 75–71 | JRU; 93–89 | CSJL; 92–96 | AU; 79–71 |
| San Beda Red Lions (SBU) | CSJL; 76–69 | LPU; 76–66 | EAC; 67–76 | MU; 64–67 | UPHSD; 75–44 | SSC–R; 77–64 | CSB; 69–71 | JRU; 75–62 | AU; 73–70 |
| San Sebastian Stags (SSC–R) | LPU; 89–94 | AU; 95–105 | CSB; 64–86 | MU; 80–79 | SBU; 64–77 | CSJL; 79–81 | EAC; 94–86 | UPHSD; 78–71 | JRU; 87–95 |
| Perpetual Altas (UPHSD) | JRU; 91–89 | CSJL; 77–69 | MU; 76–67 | EAC; 49–60 | AU; 65–68 | SBU; 44–75 | LPU; 76–72 | SSC–R; 71–78 | CSB; 72–77 |

Source: Schedule
Legend: Blue = win; Red = loss

== Playoffs ==
The single-elimination playoffs will begin on June 8, 2024 with the crossover quarterfinals, where the first-seeded teams play the fourth-seeded team from the opposing association group, same goes for the second-seeded and third-seeded teams.

Quarterfinals
U1 | UP | 94
N4 | Mapúa | 75
N2 | Benilde | 73
U3 | FEU | 74
N1 | Letran | 70
U4 | UE | 66
U2 | La Salle | 94
N3 | San Beda | 80

Semifinals
U1 | UP | 89
U3 | FEU | 77
N1 | Letran | 87
U2 | La Salle | 91

Championship game
U1 | UP | 69
U2 | La Salle | 66
Battle for Third
U3 | FEU | 80
N1 | Letran | 78

Legend

- U1, U2, U3, U4 – The teams from the UAAP group
- N1, N2, N3, N4 – The teams from the NCAA group

=== Quarterfinals ===
June 8
12:00 pm

Box Score

| Letran Knights | 70–66 | UE Red Warriors |
Scoring by quarter: 20–23, 16–21, 19–14, 15–8
| Pts: Vince Cuajao 22; Rebs: Rafael Go 8 Asts: Jonathan Manalili 5 | | Pts: John Abate 14; Rebs: Precious Momowei 14; Asts: Jack Cruz-Dumont 6 |

Filoil EcoOil Centre, San Juan

June 8
2:00 pm

Box Score

| Benilde Blazers | 73–74 | FEU Tamaraws |
Scoring by quarter: 21–21, 20–15, 12–14, 23–24
| Pts: Jhommel Ancheta 20; Rebs: Roger Ondoa 8 Asts: Mark Daniel Sangco 5 | | Pts: Francis Veejay Pre 20; Rebs: Mohamed Komateh 14; Asts: three players 3 |

Filoil EcoOil Centre, San Juan

June 8
4:00 pm

Box Score

| UP Fighting Maroons | 94–75 | Mapúa Cardinals |
Scoring by quarter: 18–12, 26–15, 26–21, 24–27
| Pts: Francis Lopez 16; Rebs: Francis Lopez 9 Asts: JD Cagulangan 5 | | Pts: Clint Escamis 21; Rebs: Aaron Fermin 6 Asts: Clint Escamis 5 |

Filoil EcoOil Centre, San Juan

June 8
6:00 pm

Box Score

| De La Salle Green Archers | 94–80 | San Beda Red Lions |
Scoring by quarter: 31–25, 25–14, 27–20, 11–21
| Pts: Kevin Quiambao 15; Rebs: Quiambao, Cortez 7 Asts: Lian Ramiro 3 | | Pts: John Bryan Sajonia 15; Rebs: James Payosing 9 Asts: James Payosing 3 |

Filoil EcoOil Centre, San Juan

=== Semifinals ===
June 9
4:00 pm

Box Score

| UP Fighting Maroons | 89–77 | FEU Tamaraws |
Scoring by quarter: 27–26, 16–12, 27–22, 19–17
| Pts: Francis Lopez 22; Rebs: Jalen Stevens 8 Asts: JD Cagulangan 9 | | Pts: Francis Veejay Pre 20; Rebs: Mohamed Konateh 16; Asts: Royce Alforque 4 |

Filoil EcoOil Centre, San Juan

June 9
6:00 pm

Box Score

| Letran Knights | 87–91 | De La Salle Green Archers |
Scoring by quarter: 24–33, 19–23, 13–18, 31–17
| Pts: Manalili, Baliling 13 each Rebs: Rafael Go 5 Asts: Jonathan Manalili 8 | | Pts: Agunnane, Policarpio 19 each Rebs: Agunnane, Quiambao 12 each Asts: three players 5 each |

Filoil EcoOil Centre, San Juan

=== Battle for Third ===
June 12
4:00 pm

Box Score

| FEU Tamaraws | 80–78 | Letran Knights |
Scoring by quarter: 24–17, 25–21, 13–29, 18–11
| Pts: Jorick Kyle Bautista 21; Rebs: Mohamed Konateh 21; Asts: Pre, Konateh 5 each | | Pts: Vince Cuajao 27; Rebs: Cuajao, Go 5 each Asts: Jonathan Manalili 7 |

Filoil EcoOil Centre, San Juan

=== Championship game ===
June 12
6:00 pm

Box Score

| UP Fighting Maroons | 69–66 | De La Salle Green Archers |
Scoring by quarter: 17–14, 6–29, 25–10, 21–13
| Pts: JD Cagulangan 13; Rebs: Francis Lopez 12; Asts: JD Cagulangan 4 | | Pts: Quiambao, Austria 14 each Rebs: Agunanne, Quiambao 10 each Asts: Lian Ramiro 6 |

Filoil EcoOil Centre, San Juan

This year's championship game was a rematch of last year's championship game, where the UP Fighting Maroons beat the De La Salle Green Archers, 87–76. It was also a rematch of the UAAP Season 86 men's basketball finals, where La Salle beat UP in a three-game series.

UP would come back from a 20-point deficit at the half to defend their title and become the second back-to-back Preseason Cup champions. Coincidentally, the only other team to do so was La Salle in the first two editions of the tournament (2006 and 2007).
