= Filoil EcoOil Preseason Cup =

College basketball tournament in the Philippines

- Most recent season or competition: 2026 Filoil EcoOil Preseason Cup
- Sport: Basketball
- Founded: 2006; 20 years ago
- First season: 2006
- Country: Philippines
- Most recent champions: JRU Heavy Bombers (1st title)
- Most titles: De La Salle Green Archers (4 titles)

The Filoil EcoOil Preseason Cup (Note: Formerly known as the Homegrown Cup, the Filoil Flying V Preseason Cup, and the Filoil EcoOil ECJ Preseason Cup in 2024) is a preseason college basketball tournament in the Philippines. It is contested by teams mainly from the University Athletic Association of the Philippines (UAAP) and the National Collegiate Athletic Association (NCAA). Occasionally, there are also invited teams such as the Philippines national under-18 team and teams from other associations.

The JRU Heavy Bombers are the current defending champions, having won their first title at the 2026 edition by defeating the San Beda Red Lions in the finals. The De La Salle Green Archers are the most successful team with four titles, while the UP Fighting Maroons have the most consecutive championships with three straight titles.

== History ==
The Filoil EcoOil Preseason Cup is held annually at the Playtime Filoil Centre (pictured as the Filoil EcoOil Centre).

The entire tournament is organized by Filoil EcoOil Sports, formerly Filoil Flyving V Sports, of the Villavicencio Group of Companies. It was first held as a post-season tournament in 2006 where it was known as the Homegrown Cup. Starting in 2007, Filoil Flying V Sports decided to hold it every summer and it was subsequently renamed as the Filoil Flying V Preseason Cup.

The De La Salle Green Archers won the first two editions of the tournament, making them, to this day, the only back-to-back tournament champions. The UE Red Warriors won the third edition of the tournament in 2008, followed by the FEU Tamaraws in 2009, the San Sebastian Stags in 2010, the Ateneo Blue Eagles in 2011, and the NU Bulldogs in 2012. UE would reclaim the title in 2013 before starting a period from 2014 through 2019 where five of the six tournaments held were won by either De La Salle or the San Beda Red Lions. De La Salle claimed their fourth in 2016, the most out of any school, while San Beda won three in five years. The only outlier during this period was Ateneo in 2018.

The 2020 and 2021 editions of the tournament were cancelled due to the COVID-19 pandemic, before resuming with its 15th edition in 2022, where it was also rebranded as the Filoil EcoOil Preseason Cup, in which NU would win. In 2024, it was announced that the 17th edition of the tournament would be named after Eduardo Cojuangco Jr., renaming it as the ECJ Preseason Cup. The UP Fighting Maroons would win three straight titles in the 2023, 2024, and 2025 editions, making them the first school to do so and, consequently, bagging the ECJ Perpetual Trophy.

== Tournament format ==
All participating teams are divided into two groups. Since 2023, teams are grouped based on association. The single round-robin tournament is used for each group.

The top four teams from each group advance to the single-elimination playoffs. The first round, the crossover quarterfinals, have the first-seeded teams matched against the fourth-seeded teams from the opposing group. The same is also applied for the second-seeded and third-seeded teams. The winner of each game advances to the next round until one team remains to become the Preseason Cup champion.

== Results ==
=== By tournament ===
| Season | Finals | | | Third-place game | | |
| Season | Champion | Score | Runner-up | Third place | Score | Fourth place |
| 1 (2006) | La Salle (UAAP) | 79–67 | JRU (NCAA) | FEU (UAAP) | 72–63 | UE (UAAP) |
| 2 (2007) | La Salle (UAAP) | 89–81 | San Beda (NCAA) | UE (UAAP) | 95–77 | NU (UAAP) |
| 3 (2008) | UE (UAAP) | 81–65 | San Beda (NCAA) | La Salle (UAAP) | 79–60 | Adamson (UAAP) |
| 4 (2009) | FEU (UAAP) | 84–78 | UE (UAAP) | San Sebastian (NCAA) | 87–78 | San Beda (NCAA) |
| 5 (2010) | San Sebastian (NCAA) | 79–78 | FEU (UAAP) | Adamson (UAAP) | 57–55 | JRU (NCAA) |
| 6 (2011) | Ateneo (UAAP) | 75–56 | San Beda (NCAA) | FEU (UAAP) | 65–57 | Adamson (UAAP) |
| 7 (2012) | NU (UAAP) | 64–54 | La Salle (UAAP) | Ateneo (UAAP) | 66–55 | San Beda (NCAA) |
| 8 (2013) | UE (UAAP) | 81–68 | NU (UAAP) | San Beda (NCAA) | 74–70 | UST (UAAP) |
| 9 (2014) | La Salle (UAAP) | 71–66 | San Beda (NCAA) | CEU (NAASCU) | 73–58 | SWU (CESAFI) |
| 10 (2015) | San Beda (NCAA) | 79–53 | La Salle (UAAP) | JRU (NCAA) | 71–69 | FEU (UAAP) |
| 11 (2016) | La Salle (UAAP) | 86–74 | Arellano (NCAA) | Ateneo (UAAP) | 66–54 | NU (UAAP) |
| 12 (2017) | San Beda (NCAA) | 75–72 | La Salle (UAAP) | Lyceum (NCAA) | 82–75 | JRU (NCAA) |
| 13 (2018) | Ateneo (UAAP) | 76–62 | San Beda (NCAA) | FEU (UAAP) | 78–58 | Benilde (NCAA) |
| 14 (2019) | San Beda (NCAA) | 74–57 | La Salle (UAAP) | Adamson (UAAP) | 96–63 | Lyceum (NCAA) |
| 15 (2022) | NU (UAAP) | 56–46 | FEU (UAAP) | La Salle (UAAP) | N/A | Adamson (UAAP) |
| 16 (2023) | UP (UAAP) | 87–76 | La Salle (UAAP) | NU (UAAP) | 85–77 | Perpetual (NCAA) |
| 17 (2024) | UP (UAAP) | 69–66 | La Salle (UAAP) | FEU (UAAP) | 80–78 | Letran (NCAA) |
| 18 (2025) | UP (UAAP) | 79–65 | NU (UAAP) | No third place game held | | |
| 19 (2026) | JRU (NCAA) | 70–59; 74–67 | San Beda (NCAA) | No third place game held | | |
| 20 (2027) | | | | | | |

=== By school ===
| School | 1st place, gold medalist(s) | 2nd place, silver medalist(s) | 3rd place, bronze medalist(s) | Total |
|---|---|---|---|---|
| De La Salle University | 4 | 6 | 2 | 12 |
| San Beda University | 3 | 6 | 1 | 10 |
| National University | 2 | 2 | 1 | 5 |
| University of the East | 2 | 1 | 1 | 4 |
| Ateneo de Manila University | 2 | 0 | 2 | 4 |
| University of the Philippines | 3 | 0 | 0 | 3 |
| Far Eastern University | 1 | 2 | 4 | 7 |
| José Rizal University | 1 | 1 | 1 | 3 |
| San Sebastian College–Recoletos | 1 | 0 | 1 | 2 |
| Arellano University | 0 | 1 | 0 | 1 |
| Adamson University | 0 | 0 | 2 | 2 |
| Centro Escolar University | 0 | 0 | 1 | 1 |
| Lyceum of the Philippines University | 0 | 0 | 1 | 1 |
| University of Santo Tomas | 0 | 0 | 1 | 1 |

=== By league ===
| School | 1st place, gold medalist(s) | 2nd place, silver medalist(s) | 3rd place, bronze medalist(s) | Total |
|---|---|---|---|---|
| UAAP | 14 | 10 | 13 | 37 |
| NCAA | 5 | 8 | 4 | 17 |
| NAASCU | 0 | 0 | 1 | 1 |

== Media coverage ==
The tournament has had multiple media coverage partners over the years, beginning with ABS-CBN, whose now-defunct sports division was a broadcast partner from 2006 until 2016. The tournament was left without a broadcast partner in 2017, before signing a deal with ESPN5 for 2018 and 2019. The 2023 edition was then broadcast by Solar Sports.

== See also ==
- Shakey's Super League – a similar tournament for women's collegiate volleyball
- Philippine Collegiate Champions League
- UAAP basketball championships
- NCAA basketball championships (Philippines)
