= Universal College =

Private college in Parañaque, Philippines

Coordinates: 14°28′30″N 121°00′07″E

Universal College, formerly the Universal College of Nursing, is a school located in Parañaque, Metro Manila, Philippines. It was established in 2005.

== History ==
Built and established in 2005, the Universal College of Nursing was founded by Domingo Tay. Tay wanted to address the labor demand gap both for the local and global markets. Hence, the first program became B.S. Nursing.

Tourism (BST), Hotel and Restaurant Management (BSHRM), Information System (BSIS) and Business Administration with Majors in Financial Management and Marketing (BSBA) were subsequently offered. As of 2008, all its academic programs are now recognized by the Commission on Higher Education. To date, UC has new courses such as Bachelor of Elementary Education (BEEd), Bachelor of Secondary Education, BS Accountancy, BS Electrical Engineering, BS Computer Engineering, bs Electronics Engineering, and Short Courses such as Culinary Arts, Medical Transcription, Caregiving NC II, Certificate in Practical Nursing, Hotel and Restaurant Services, PC Operations NC II, Programming NC II, and Computer Hardware Servicing NC II.

The first batch of B.S. Nursing graduates took the Nursing board examination in June 2009 and seventeen graduates passed and took oath with the Professional Regulation Commission. .

In 2013, the UC Culinary Arts started to accept students who want to earn diploma in cooking. In 2016, with the paradigm shift in the teaching and learning process in the Basic Education Curriculum, UC offered Senior High School (SHS) Program. The SHS program includes the Academic Track and Technical Vocational (TVL) Track. Specifically for the academics; Science Technology Engineering Mathematics (STEM) Strand, Accountancy Business Management (ABM) Strand, Humanities and Social Sciences (HUMSS) Strand, General Academic (GAS) Strand. More to, TVL track encompasses Home Economic Strand and Information and Communication Technology Strand.

== Colleges ==
- College of Nursing and Allied Health Sciences (CNAHS)
- College of International Tourism and Hospitality Management (CITHM)
- College of Business and Accountancy (CBA)
- College of Information Technology (CIT)
- College of Education (CEd)
- College of Engineering and Architecture (CEA)
