= Colleges and Universities Sports Association =

Athletic association in the Philippines

- Founded: 1994; 32 years ago
- Country: Philippines
- Venue: Metro Manila

The Colleges and Universities Sports Association is an athletic association composed of colleges and universities in the Philippines. It was established in 1994. The league ended in 2007.

== History ==
The league was first established in 1995. In the league's first ever men's basketball finals, TIP faced off against MLQU. TIP became the league's first champion in men's basketball. TIP then went on to win the inaugural overall championship.

On August 17, 1996, the 2nd season began with PCU as host. Aside from hosting, PCU had also joined the National Collegiate Athletic Association (NCAA) while also playing in the National Capital Region Athletic Association (NCRAA). The MLQU Stallions and the CCP Bobcats faced each other that season for the men's basketball championship. Led by the league's MVP in Celino Cruz and Wynne Arboleda, MLQU got its first men's basketball title.

For the 1997–98 season, the league welcomed AMA Computer Education as its newest school. With the return of Las Piñas Colleges, the league had 10 member schools. That season, Las Piñas Colleges reached the finals for the basketball tournament, led by Ernesto Billones and head coach Louie Alas. Once again though, MLQU won the men's basketball championship that year.

The 6th season began on August 24, 2000, with TIP as host. That season, PCCr won its fourth straight women's basketball title. TIP won the men's badminton tournament that year. The tournament was dominated by CCP, who won events in volleyball, chess, and table tennis enroute to its third straight overall championship.

The 7th season began on August 29, 2001 with Metro Manila College as host and opening ceremonies held at the Araneta Coliseum. Trinity University of Asia joined the league that season. University of the Assumption won the men's basketball tournament that year. They also won in men's table tennis. PMI then defeated CCP for the women's basketball championship. They also won in both categories of volleyball. In chess, MLQU won gold. Once again, CCP claimed the overall crown.

The 8th season began on August 29, 2002 with 12 schools and the introduction of football. That season, Las Piñas Colleges finally captured its first title in men's basketball over the UA Blue Pelicans. Once again, CCP dominated with gold medals in volleyball and table tennis and silver medals in basketball, football, badminton and swimming to win its 5th straight overall championship.

On August 26, 2003, the 9th season began. In a rematch of last year's finals, Las Piñas Colleges was able to defend its title in men's basketball, as they were led by Joel Gragasin and Dennis Daa.

== Member schools ==
| Institution | Varsity team | Status | Founded | Color | Location |
|---|---|---|---|---|---|
| FEATI University | FEATI Seahawks | Private | 1946 | | Santa Cruz, Manila |
| University of the Assumption | UA Blue Pelicans | Private | 1963 | | San Fernando City, Pampanga |
| Central Colleges of the Philippines | CCP Bobcats | Private | 1954 | Mapua school colors | Aurora Blvd., Quezon City |
| De La Salle Araneta University | DLS-AU Cowboys | Private | 1946 | | Malabon |
| De Ocampo Memorial Colleges | DOMC Cobras | Private | 1962 | | Santa Mesa, Manila |
| Centro Escolar Las Piñas | LPC Blue Lions | Private | 1975 | | Almanza, Las Piñas |
| Manuel L. Quezon University | MLQU Stallions | Private | 1947 | UPHD school colors | Santa Cruz, Manila |
| Metro Manila College | MMC Bisons | Private | 1947 | | Novaliches, Quezon City |
| Philippine College of Criminology | PCCr Enforcers | Private | 1954 | Mapua school colors | Santa Cruz, Manila |
| PMI Colleges | PMI Admirals | Private | 1948 | Letran school colors | Santa Cruz, Manila |
| Saint Jude College | SJC Crusaders | Private | 1968 | Ateneo school colors | Dimasalang, Sampaloc, Manila |
| Trinity University of Asia | TUA Broncos | Private | 1963 | | Quezon City |
| Technological Institute of the Philippines | TIP Engineers | Private | 1962 | UST school colors | Quezon City |
| World Citi Colleges | WCC Vikings | Private | 1979 | | Cubao, Quezon City |

== Champions ==
=== Overall ===
- 1995–1996 - Technological Institute of the Philippines
- 1996–1997 -
- 1997–1998 -
- 1998–1999 - Central Colleges of the Philippines
- 1999–2000 - Central Colleges of the Philippines
- 2000–2001 - Central Colleges of the Philippines
- 2001–2002 - Central Colleges of the Philippines
- 2002–2003 - Central Colleges of the Philippines

=== Basketball ===
==== Men's ====
- 1995–1996 - Technological Institute of the Philippines
- 1996–1997 - Manuel L. Quezon University
- 1997–1998 - Manuel L. Quezon University
- 1998–1999 -
- 1999–2000 -
- 2000–2001 -
- 2001–2002 - University of the Assumption
- 2002–2003 - Las Piñas Colleges
- 2003–2004 - Las Piñas Colleges
- 2004–2005 - PMI Colleges
- 2005–2006 -
- 2006–2007 - PMI Colleges
- 2007–2008 -
- 2008–2009 - Manuel L. Quezon University

==== Women's ====
- 2000–2001 - Philippine College of Criminology
- 2001–2002 - PMI Colleges

=== Volleyball ===
==== Men's ====
- 2000–2001 - Central Colleges of the Philippines
- 2001–2002 - PMI Colleges

==== Women's ====
- 2000–2001 - Central Colleges of the Philippines
- 2001–2002 - PMI Colleges

=== Chess ===
- 2000–2001 - Central Colleges of the Philippines
- 2001–2002 - Manuel L. Quezon University
