= 2026 Filoil EcoOil Preseason Cup =

Philippine college basketball tournament

19th Filoil EcoOil Preseason Cup

Tournament details
- Country: Philippines
- City: San Juan
- Venue: Filoil Centre
- Dates: May 17 – July 23, 2026
- Teams: 17: 6 (UAAP); 10 (NCAA); 1 (guest)
- Defending champions: UP Fighting Maroons

Final positions
- Champions: JRU Heavy Bombers (1st title)
- Runners-up: San Beda Red Lions

The 2026 Filoil EcoOil Preseason Cup was the 19th edition of the college basketball tournament organized by Filoil EcoOil Sports. The tournament began on May 17 and ended on July 23, with all games taking place at the Filoil Centre in San Juan.

The tournament featured 17 teams including six University Athletic Association of the Philippines (UAAP) teams, ten National Collegiate Athletic Association (NCAA). The UE Red Warriors' slot was taken up by the Philippines men's national under-18 basketball team.

On June 14, the Ateneo Blue Eagles withdrew from the tournament following the deaths of its players Rene Baterbonia and Divine Adili. Prior to their withdrawal, they had only played one game, a 72–52 win over the Adamson Soaring Falcons on June 6.

The UP Fighting Maroons entered this tournament as the three-time defending Preseason Cup champions, having won permanent possession of the ECJ Trophy in 2025. As such, a second iteration of the trophy will be introduced with this edition.

== Elimination round ==
In the elimination round, the teams are grouped by association with the Gilas U-18 placed in the UAAP group. From there, teams play in a single round-robin tournament within their respective groups. The six UAAP teams and Gilas U-18 will play six games (except Adamson, who had already played against Ateneo prior to the latter's withdrawal), while all ten NCAA teams play nine. Teams are ranked by win-loss records with the top four teams from each group advancing to the playoffs.

=== UAAP group ===
==== Team standings ====
Pos	Team	Pld	W	L	PF	PA	PD	PCT	GB
1	UP Fighting Maroons	6	5	1	493	424	+69	.833 (Note: UP wins tiebreaker over NU by head-to-head match-up (76–67).)	—
2	NU Bulldogs	6	5	1	467	421	+46	.833	—
3	De La Salle Green Archers	6	4	2	474	481	−7	.667	1
4	UST Growling Tigers	6	3	3	493	475	+18	.500 (Note: UST wins tiebreaker over FEU by head-to-head match-up (83–75).)	2
5	FEU Tamaraws	6	3	3	468	435	+33	.500	2
6	Adamson Soaring Falcons	5	0	5	323	388	−65	.000 (Note: Adamson wins tiebreaker over Gilas Pilipinas U-18 by points difference.)	4.5
7	(Philippines) Gilas Pilipinas U-18	5	0	5	370	464	−94	.000	4.5
8	w – ~~Ateneo Blue Eagles~~	0	~~1~~	~~0~~	~~72~~	~~52~~	—	—	2

Updated to match(es) played on June 26, 2026. Source: Standings via Team Pilipinas
w – Withdrawn

==== Results ====
Team	Game					
Team	1	2	3	4	5	6
Adamson Soaring Falcons (AdU)	NU; 66–74	UST; 59–81	DLSU; 82–85	UP; 53–69	FEU; 63–79	(Philippines) PHI; No game
~~Ateneo Blue Eagles~~ (ADMU)	~~AdU~~; ~~72–52~~	Game not held	Game not held	Game not held	Game not held	Game not held
De La Salle Green Archers (DLSU)	NU; 64–70	UST; 79–78	FEU; 82–77	AdU; 85–82	(Philippines) PHI; 97–76	UP; 67–98
FEU Tamaraws (FEU)	(Philippines) PHI; 83–58	UST; 75–83	NU; 69–73	DLSU; 77–82	UP; 85–76	AdU; 79–63
NU Bulldogs (NU)	DLSU; 70–64	UP; 67–76	AdU; 74–66	FEU; 73–69	UST; 90–74	(Philippines) PHI; 93–72
UP Fighting Maroons (UP)	UST; 82–78	NU; 76–67	(Philippines) PHI; 92–74	AdU; 69–53	DLSU; 98–67	FEU; 76–85
UST Growling Tigers (UST)	UP; 78–82	DLSU; 78–79	FEU; 83–75	AdU; 81–59	NU; 74–90	(Philippines) PHI; 99–90
(Philippines) Gilas Pilipinas U-18 (PHI)	FEU; 58–83	UP; 74–92	DLSU; 76–97	UST; 90–99	NU; 72–93	AdU; No game

Updated to match(es) played on June 26, 2026. Source: All-Star Magazine
Legend: Blue = win; Red = loss

=== NCAA group ===
==== Team standings ====
Pos	Team	Pld	W	L	PF	PA	PD	PCT	GB
1	Letran Knights	9	8	1	706	671	+35	.889	—
2	San Beda Red Lions	9	7	2	692	637	+55	.778 (Note: San Beda (+11) wins tiebreaker over JRU (+6) and Mapua (-17) by head-to-head point differential.)	1
3	JRU Heavy Bombers	9	7	2	682	629	+53	.778	1
4	Mapúa Cardinals	9	7	2	670	642	+28	.778	1
5	Benilde Blazers	9	5	4	713	691	+22	.556	3
6	EAC Generals	9	4	5	769	749	+20	.444	4
7	Perpetual Altas	9	3	6	586	618	−32	.333 (Note: Perpetual wins tiebreakers over Lyceum by head-to-head match-up (68–64).)	5
8	Lyceum Pirates	9	3	6	693	749	−56	.333	5
9	Arellano Chiefs	9	1	8	718	725	−7	.111	7
10	San Sebastian Stags	9	0	9	644	762	−118	.000	8

Updated to match(es) played on June 26, 2026. Source: Standings via Team Pilipinas

==== Results ====
Team	Game								
Team	1	2	3	4	5	6	7	8	9
Arellano Chiefs (AU)	EAC; 88–91 (OT)	LPU; 75–82 (OT)	UPHSD; 76–78 (OT)	CSJL; 86–88	JRU; 67–73	MU; 89–94	SBU; 75–76	CSB; 59–65	SSC–R; 103–78
Letran Knights (CSJL)	JRU; 70–80	CSB; 75–71 (OT)	SSC–R; 96–85	MU; 83–72	EAC; 71–65	AU; 88–86	LPU; 86–83	SBU; 67–63	UPHSD; 70–66
Benilde Blazers (CSB)	UPHSD; 71–62	CSJL; 71–75 (OT)	LPU; 85–72	SBU; 89–95	MU; 67–84	SSC–R; 91–68	EAC; 93–96	AU; 65–59	JRU; 81–80 (OT)
EAC Generals (EAC)	AU; 91–88 (OT)	CSJL; 65–71	SBU; 80–86	JRU; 84–87	UPHSD; 84–63	CSB; 96–93	SSC–R; 95–81	MU; 83–85	LPU; 91–95
JRU Heavy Bombers (JRU)	CSJL; 80–70	UPHSD; 66–54	LPU; 83–75	AU; 73–67	EAC; 87–84	SBU; 73–65	MU; 62–64	SSC–R; 78–69	CSB; 80–81 (OT)
Lyceum Pirates (LPU)	MU; 66–87	AU; 82–75 (OT)	SBU; 77–102	CSB; 72–85	JRU; 75–83	SSC–R; 79–72	CSJL; 83–86	UPHSD; 64–68	EAC; 95–91
Mapúa Cardinals (MU)	LPU; 87–66	CSJL; 72–83	CSB; 84–67	AU; 94–89	JRU; 64–62	EAC; 85–83	SSC–R; 68–66	UPHSD; 67–58	SBU; 49–68
San Beda Red Lions (SBU)	SSC–R; 75–67	LPU; 102–77	EAC; 86–80	CSB; 95–89	UPHSD; 62–60	JRU; 65–73	AU; 76–75	CSJL; 63–67	MU; 68–49
San Sebastian Stags (SSC–R)	SBU; 67–75	CSJL; 85–96	LPU; 72–79	CSB; 68–91	UPHSD; 58–77	EAC; 81–95	JRU; 69–78	MU; 66–68	AU; 78–103
Perpetual Altas (UPHSD)	CSB; 62–71	JRU; 54–66	AU; 78–76 (OT)	SBU; 60–62	EAC; 63–84	SSC–R; 77–58	LPU; 68–64	MU; 58–67	CSJL; 66–70

Updated to match(es) played on June 26, 2026. Source: All-Star Magazine
Legend: Blue = win; Red = loss

== Playoffs ==
The playoffs began on July 10, 2026 with the crossover quarterfinals, where the first-seeded teams play the fourth-seeded team from the opposing association group, same goes for the second-seeded and third-seeded teams.

Quarterfinals
U1	UP	67
N4	Mapúa	64
N2	San Beda	64
U3	La Salle	59
N1	Letran	103*
U4	UST	102
U2	NU	61
N3	JRU	62

Semifinals
U1	UP	72
N2	San Beda	93
N1	Letran	73
N3	JRU	82

Finals (Best-of-three playoff)
N2	San Beda	59	67
N3	JRU	70	74

*Overtime

Legend

- U1, U2, U3, U4 – The teams from the UAAP group
- N1, N2, N3, N4 – The teams from the NCAA group

=== Quarterfinals ===
July 10
11:00 am

Box score

NU Bulldogs	61–62	JRU Heavy Bombers
Scoring by quarter: 15–14, 17–15, 18–18, 11–15
Pts: Mo Diassana, Reinhard Jumamoy 13; Rebs: Mo Diassana 17; Asts: Chad Cartel 4		Pts: Jalen Garcia 17; Rebs: Allan Laurenaria 6 Asts: three players 2

Playtime Filoil Centre, San Juan

July 10
1:00 pm

Box score

UST Growling Tigers	102–103 (OT)	Letran Knights
Scoring by quarter: 20–24, 29–22, 20–26, 20–17, Overtime: 13–14
Pts: Amiel Acido 20; Rebs: Peter Osang 10; Asts: Amiel Acido 8		Pts: Chad Gammad 27; Rebs: Aaron Buensalida, George Diamante 7 Asts: Jonathan Manalili 15

Playtime Filoil Centre, San Juan

July 10
3:00 pm

Box score

UP Fighting Maroons	82–73	Mapúa Cardinals
Scoring by quarter: 19–15, 19–15, 17–17, 12–17
Pts: Jacob Bayla 16; Rebs: Sean Alter 6 Asts: three players 4		Pts: Marc Cuenco 19; Rebs: Yam Concepcion 10; Asts: Marc Cuenco 5

Playtime Filoil Centre, San Juan

July 10
6:00 pm

Box score

De La Salle Green Archers	59–64	San Beda Red Lions
Scoring by quarter: 12–16, 15–17, 12–13, 20–18
Pts: Jacob Cortez 13; Rebs: Luis Pablo 8 Asts: Jacob Cortez 5		Pts: Dominic Sarigumba, Zedjay Etulle 10; Rebs: Lawrence Hawkins 11; Asts: Dominic Sarigumba 7

Playtime Filoil Centre, San Juan

=== Semifinals ===
July 19
3:00 pm

Box score

Letran Knights	73–82	JRU Heavy Bombers
Scoring by quarter: 16–23, 20–24, 14–19, 23–16
Pts: Jonathan Manalili 28; Rebs: three players 6 Asts: Jonathan Manalili 9		Pts: Chris Hubilla 22; Rebs: Allan Laurenaria 10; Asts: Jay Stephen Garupil 4

Playtime Filoil Centre, San Juan

July 19
5:00 pm

Box score

UP Fighting Maroons	72–93	San Beda Red Lions
Scoring by quarter: 15–24, 20–13, 13–31, 24–25
Pts: three players 10; Rebs: Sean Alter 8 Asts: Arvie Poyos 6		Pts: RC Calimag 27; Rebs: Zedjay Etulle 12; Asts: Dominic Sarigumba 7

Playtime Filoil Centre, San Juan

=== Finals ===
July 21
5:00 pm

Box score

San Beda Red Lions	59–70	JRU Heavy Bombers
Scoring by quarter: 19–22, 18–19, 11–15, 11–14
Pts: Zedjay Etulle 14; Rebs: Lawrence Hawkins 9 Asts: Penny Estacio, Daniel Marcelo 4		Pts: Lawrence Mangubat 22; Rebs: Lawrence Mangubat, Chris Hubilla 9 Asts: three players 3

Playtime Filoil Centre, San Juan

July 23
4:00 pm

Box score

San Beda Red Lions	67–74	JRU Heavy Bombers
Scoring by quarter: 13–14, 15–15, 12–23, 27–22
Pts: Zedjay Etulle 14; Rebs: Sean Aldous Torculas 7 Asts: three players 3		Pts: Lawrence Mangubat 27; Rebs: Jamhir Eligado 9 Asts: Chris Hubilla 5
JRU wins series 2-0

Playtime Filoil Centre, San Juan

=== Awards ===
The awards were given after the second game of the Finals.

- Most Valuable Player: Lawrence Mangubat (JRU Heavy Bombers)
- Mythical Five:
  - Lawrence Mangubat (JRU Heavy Bombers)
  - Chris Hubilla (JRU Heavy Bombers)
  - Aldous Torculas (San Beda Red Lions)
  - Jonathan Manalili (Letran Knights)
  - Veejay Pre (UP Fighting Maroons)
- Defensive Player of the Year: Allen Laurenaria (JRU Heavy Bombers)
