= San Pedro College of Business Administration =

Private college in Laguna, Philippines

- Established: 1986
- Location: San Pedro, Laguna, Philippines; 14°21′16″N 121°03′41″E
- Website: www.spcba.edu.ph
- Location in Laguna Location in Luzon Location in the Philippines

The San Pedro College of Business Administration or SPCBA is a private, nonsectarian, tertiary institute located at Km. 30 Old National Highway, Barangay Nueva, San Pedro, Laguna, Philippines.

== Undergraduate degree programs ==
- Accountancy
- Business Administration (majors in Marketing Management and Human Resources Development Management)
- Computer Science
- Information Technology
- Psychology
- Elementary Education (majors in English, Science and Mathematics)
- Secondary Education (majors in English, Science and Mathematics)
- Hotel and Restaurant Management
- Tourism
- Industrial Engineering
- Computer Engineering
- Mechanical Engineering
- Human Resource Development

== Graduate degree programs ==
- Master of Business Administration
- Master of Government Management
