= University of Manila =

Private university in Manila, Philippines

The University of Manila
- Ang Pamantasan ng Maynila (Filipino)
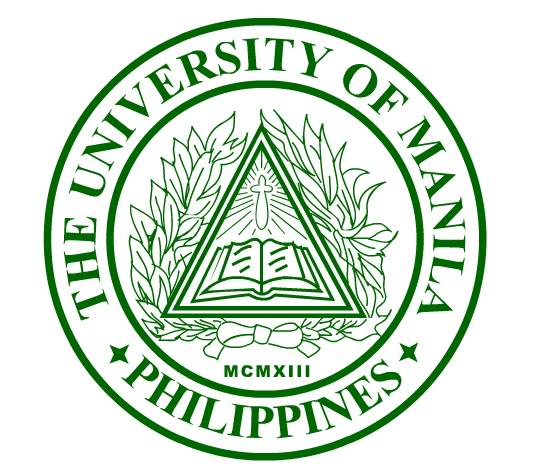
- Former name: Instituto de Manila (1913–1921)
- Motto: Latin: Patria Scientia et Virtus
- Motto in English: Country Science and Virtue
- Type: Private Non-sectarian Coeducational Basic and Higher education institution
- Established: October 5, 1913; 113 years ago
- Founders: Apolinario G. de los Santos; Mariano V. de los Santos; Maria de los Santos; Buenaventura J. Bello; Antonio Rivero
Academic affiliations
ASAIHL; PACU PACUCOA	IAU; PAFTE PSERE
- President: Emily Dodson de Leon, Ed. D.
- Faculty: 800
- Students: over 9,000
- Location: 546 MV delos Santos St., Sampaloc, Manila, Metro Manila, Philippines; 14°36′11″N 120°59′26″E
- Campus: Urban Sampaloc, Manila
- Alma Mater Song: "UM Forever"
- Colors: Green and Gold
- Nickname: Hawks
- Sporting affiliations: NAASCU
- Mascot: Hawk
- Sports: Basketball
- Website: www.um.edu.ph
- Location in Manila Location in Metro Manila Location in Luzon Location in the Philippines

The University of Manila (UM or TUM; Filipino: Ang Pamantasan ng Maynila), is a private, non-sectarian coeducational university located in Sampaloc, Manila, Philippines. It was founded on October 5, 1913, as the Instituto de Manila, by Apolinario G. de los Santos, Mariano V. de los Santos, Maria de los Santos, Buenaventura J. Bello and Antonio Rivero. The first three were siblings. They named their school Instituto de Manila, after the City of Manila and Apolinario G. de los Santos was elected as the first director of the school.

The university was first situated in Binondo and offered primary and secondary education. It then moved to Sampaloc, Manila.

== Facilities ==
=== International Language School ===
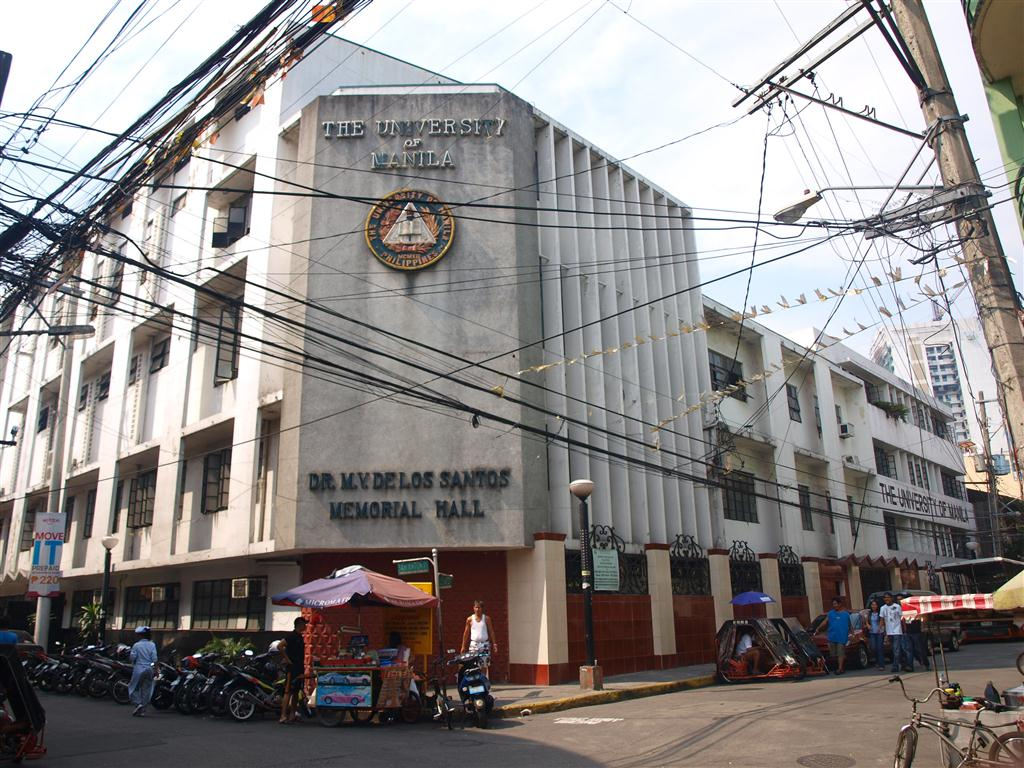
M.V. De los Santos Hall of the university

The International Language School offers courses in the English language to a variety foreign students. Some of the students are from the Chinese, Japanese, and Korean communities. It also offers courses in the Chinese language and Japanese (Nihongo) language. The International Language School building likewise provides accommodations for foreign students.

=== Emiramona Garden Hotel ===
The Emiramona Garden Hotel serves as a training center of the Hotel and Restaurant Management and Tourism students of the university, and is located in Tagaytay, Cavite.

=== College of Law ===
In 2025, the university's College of Law was ordered closed by the Legal Education Board due to failure to meet quality standards and poor performance in the Philippine Bar Examinations.

== Sports ==
The University of Manila was one of the original members of the National Collegiate Athletic Association (NCAA), which was founded in 1924. The university was also a former member of the University Athletic Association of the Philippines from 1952 to 1954. Its varsity, the UM Hawks, joined the National Athletic Association of Schools, Colleges and Universities (NAASCU) from 2001 to 2012 where it won seven championships.

== Inter-university relations ==
On April 7, 1957, UM entered into a sisterhood relationship with Dohto University of Sapporo and Monbetsu cities, Hokkaido, Japan. Since then, it has undertaken various projects including faculty exchange visits, and technological and library assistance. UM students have also been given the opportunity to study at Tokai University in Tokyo, Japan through an arrangement with the Philippine-Japan Students' Friendship Exchange Association (or P-JSFEA). A score later, October 31, 1977, UM suggested a sisterhood relationship with Hansung University in Seoul, South Korea. On January 1, 1997, in Taipei, UM's high-school department and building also linked a sisterhood relationship with Cheng Kung Commercial and Technical High School in Pate City, Taiwan, Republic Of China where UM students can work independently. A sisterhood relationship was again entered into by the university with Meio University of Nago City, Okinawa, Japan on Dec. 5, 1988 when UM announced a plan for its sisterhoods.

== Notable alumni ==
- Emmanuel Pelaez - 6th Vice President of the Philippines
- R. Lee Ermey - Hollywood actor
- Fabian Ver - military officer, chief of staff, and martial law enforcer
- Alex Niño - comic artist
- Alejo Santos - World War II hero and Governor of Bulacan
- Oscar Moreno - Mayor of Cagayan de Oro
- Alberto A. Villavert - Governor of Antique
- Dimasangcay Pundato - Moro revolutionary leader and undersecretary of the Office of the Presidential Adviser on the Peace Process
- Dominador Aytona - late Secretary of Finance of the Philippines, senator, lawyer
- Reynel Hugnatan - professional basketball player
- Ronnie Matias - professional basketball player
- Serafin R. Cuevas - former Associate Justice of the Supreme Court of the Philippines

== Affiliations ==
The University of Manila is an active member of the Philippine Association of Colleges and Universities (PACU), Commission on Higher Education, Association of Southeast Asian Institutions of Higher Learning (ASAIHL), Philippine Association of Colleges and Universities Commission on Accreditation (PACUCOA), Philippine Association of Teacher Education (PAFTE), Philippine Society for Educational Research and Evaluation (PSERE), the University Belt Consortium, and the International Association of Universities.
