= Homegrown Cup =

Basketball tournament in the Philippines

The Homegrown Invitational Cup is a collegiate basketball tournament in the Philippines. It aims to determine which is the best "homegrown" collegiate team. Homegrown players are those who came directly from the juniors team of the said school. As a rule, each team must have at least 3 players from its roster who came from their junior ranks. The league gained TV coverage in 2006 through Studio 23. Fil-Oil and Flying V are the main sponsors of the tournament, hence this tournament is the first edition of what would eventually become the Filoil EcoOil Preseason Cup.

== 2006 Season ==
=== Participating teams ===
- UAAP
  - Ateneo de Manila University Blue Eagles
  - De La Salle University Green Archers
  - Far Eastern University Tamaraws
  - University of the East Red Warriors
  - University of the Philippines Fighting Maroons
  - University of Santo Tomas Growling Tigers
- NCAA
  - Colegio de San Juan de Letran Knights
  - Jose Rizal University Heavy Bombers
  - San Beda College Red Lions
  - San Sebastian College - Recoletos Stags

=== Format ===
- Each team must have at least 3 homegrown players in their roster.
- Cross over single-round robin format.
- Top two teams in each group battle in the semifinals.
- Single game championship.

=== Elimination round ===
==== Group A ====
Qualified for playoffs	Eliminated

Team	W	L
FEU Tamaraws	3	2
JRU Heavy Bombers	3	2
Letran Knights	2	3
UST Growling Tigers	2	3
Ateneo Blue Eagles	2	3

==== Group B ====
Qualified for playoffs	Eliminated

Team	W	L
De La Salle Green Archers	5	0
UE Red Warriors	5	0
San Beda Red Lions	1	4
San Sebastian Stags	1	4
UP Fighting Maroons	0	5

=== Playoffs ===
Semi-finals
December 13, 2006 - PhilSports Arena
FEU	64
JRU	78
December 13, 2006 - PhilSports Arena
La Salle	76
UE	67

Final
December 17, 2006 - PhilSports Arena
JRU	67
La Salle	79
Third place
December 17, 2006 - PhilSports Arena
FEU	72
UE	63

=== Awards ===
2006 Champion
De La Salle University - Manila

- Tournament MVP: Rico Maierhofer (De La Salle University)
- Mythical Five:
  - Guard: JVee Casio (De La Salle University)
  - Guard: James Martinez (University of the East)
  - Forward: Paul Sanga (Far Eastern University)
  - Forward: Rico Maierhofer (De La Salle University)
  - Center: James Sena (Jose Rizal University)
