= Philippine College of Criminology =

Private college in Manila, Philippines

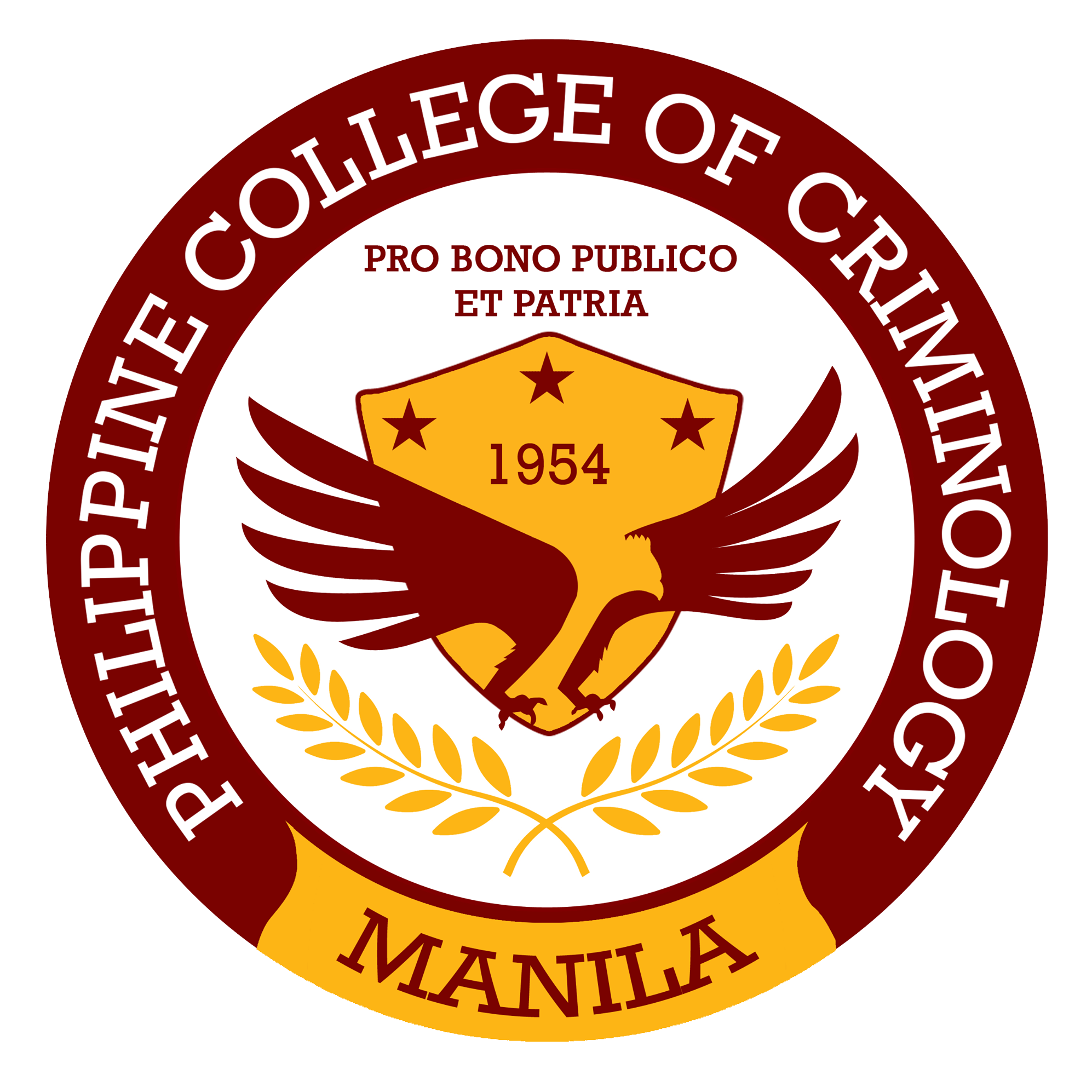
- Former name: Plaridel Educational Institution (1954–1960)
- Type: Private higher education institution
- Established: 1954; 72 years ago
- Founder: Felix Bautista
- President: Ma Angelica Lei Bautista
- Location: Santa Cruz, Manila, Metro Manila, Philippines; 14°36′07″N 120°59′00″E
- Colors: Cardinal Red Grey
- Website: www.pccr.edu.ph
- Location in Manila Location in Metro Manila Location in Luzon Location in the Philippines

The Philippine College of Criminology (PCCR) is a private secondary and higher education institution located in Quiapo, Manila, Philippines. It is currently led by Ma. Angelica Lei Bautista as president.

== History ==
Former Supreme Court Justice Felix Angelo Bautista founded the Philippine College of Criminology in 1954. It is the pioneer school of criminology for scientific crime detection and police science education in the Philippines.

== Notable alumni ==
- Robin Padilla, Senator of the Philippines, actor
- Yul Servo, former councilor (2007-2016), congressman (2016-2022) and Vice Mayor (2022-2025) of Manila and actor
