= National Athletic Association of Schools, Colleges and Universities =

Athletic college association in the Philippines

- Upcoming season or competition: NAASCU Season 24
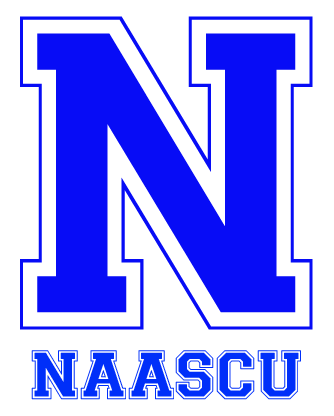
- Founded: 2001
- First season: 2001
- President: Dr. Putli Martha Beata Ijiran (Philippine Christian University)
- Commissioner: Cris Bautista (Basketball)
- No. of teams: 14
- Country: Philippines
- Website: naascu.web.geniussports.com

The National Athletic Association of Schools, Colleges and Universities (NAASCU) is an athletic association of colleges and universities in the Philippines. It was established in 2001.

NAASCU sports are men's, women's and juniors basketball, men's and women's volleyball, table tennis, chess, taekwondo, badminton, and cheerdance.

== Member institutions ==
Institution	Seniors	Juniors	Women	Status	Founded	Affiliation (Population)	Color	Location
Bestlink College of the Philippines	Kalasag	Junior Kalasag	Lady Kalasag	Private	2002	Non-Sectarian	Sky Blue & Purple	Novaliches, Quezon City
City University of Pasay	Eagles	Eaglets	Lady Eagles	Public	1994	Non-sectarian (12,134)	Green & White	Pasay
Enderun Colleges	Titans	Junior Titans	Lady Titans	Private	2005	Non-Sectarian (200–400)	Bronze & Burgundy	Bonifacio Global City, Taguig
Gardner College	Knights	Junior Knights	Lady Knights	Private	1995	Non-Sectarian	Blue Green & White	Cainta, Rizal
Immaculate Conception I-College of Arts and Technology	Icons	N/A	Lady Icons	Private	2008	Non-Sectarian	Blue & White	Santa Maria, Bulacan
Manuel L. Quezon University	Stallions	Junior Stallions	Lady Stallions	Private	1947	Non-Sectarian (1,900)	Maroon & White	Quiapo, Manila
New Era University	Hunters	Baby Hunters	Lady Hunters	Private (Iglesia ni Cristo)	1975	Non-Sectarian (13,574)	Green and Red	New Era, Quezon City
Our Lady of Fatima University	Phoenix	Baby Phoenix	Lady Phoenix	Private	1967	Non-Sectarian (8,000)	Green and White	Antipolo
Philippine Christian University	Dolphins	Baby Dolphins	Lady Dolphins	Private (United Methodist Church)	1946	Protestant (n/a)	Blue and Silver	Taft Ave., Manila
Philippine International College	Commandos	Junior Commandos	Lady Commandas	Private (Philippine Evangelical Holiness Church)	1996	N/A	Green & White	Antipolo, Rizal
Regis Marie College	Wildcats	Junior Wildcats	Lady Wildcats	Private	1992	N/A	Blue and White	Sucat, Paranaque
St. Bernadette of Lourdes College	Bagani	Junior Bagani	Lady Bagani	Private	2003	Non-Sectarian	Violet & Gold	West Fairview, Quezon City
St. Clare College of Caloocan	Saints	Junior Saints	Lady Saints	Private	1986	Catholic (2,567)	Navy Blue and Orange	Caloocan
University of Makati	Herons	Baby Herons	Lady Herons	Public	1972	Non-Sectarian (15,000+)	Royal Blue & Yellow	Taguig (Note: Since 2023, the University of Makati is located in Taguig but is under the ownership of the City Government of Makati.)

== Former members ==
left in 2002

- Our Lady of Lourdes Technological Institute (OLLTI Saints), Quezon City

left in 2003

- Arellano University (AU Flaming Arrows/Chiefs), Manila
- Angeles University Foundation (AUF Great Danes), Pampanga
- Las Piñas College (LPC Blue Lions), Las Piñas

left in 2004

- World Citi Colleges (WCC Vikings), Quezon City

left in 2011

- San Sebastian College - Recoletos de Cavite (SSC-RC Baycats), Cavite

left in 2012

- Informatics International University (IIU Icons), Quezon City
- University of Manila (UM Hawks), Manila

left in 2013

- STI College (STI Olympians), Manila
- Trace College (TC Stallions), Los Baños, Laguna

left in 2015

- Central Colleges of the Philippines (CCP Bobcats), Quezon City
- Diliman College (Diliman College Senators/Blue Dragons), Quezon City
- Polytechnic University of the Philippines (PUP Mighty Maroons), Manila
- Santa Isabel College (Santa Isabel Isabelans), Taft Ave., Manila

left in 2016

- Centro Escolar University (CEU Scorpions), Mendiola, Manila

left in 2017

- Eulogio "Amang" Rodriguez Institute of Science and Technology (EARIST Red Fox), Sampaloc, Manila

left in 2018

- Colegio De San Lorenzo (CDSL Griffins), Quezon City
- Lyceum of Subic Bay (LSB Sharks), Olongapo

left in 2019

- De Ocampo Memorial College (DOMC Cobras), Sta. Mesa, Manila
- National Teachers College (NTC Bearers), Quiapo, Manila
- Rizal Technological University (RTU Blue Thunder), Mandaluyong

left between 2020 and 2024

- De La Salle Araneta University (DLSAU Stallions), Malabon
- Philippine Merchant Marine School (PMMS Mariners), Las Piñas
- Saint Francis of Assisi College (SFAC Doves), Las Piñas
- Technological University of the Philippines (TUP Gray Hawks), Ermita, Manila

== Champions ==
=== Basketball ===
Men's basketball
Year	Champion team	Runners-up	Ref.
2001–02	University of Manila (1)	Las Piñas College	
2002–03	University of Manila (2)	University of Makati	
2003–04	University of Manila (3)	University of Makati	
2004–05	University of Manila (4)		
2005–06	University of Manila (5)	STI College	
2006–07	AMA Computer University (1)		
2007–08	STI College (1)	University of Manila	
2008–09	San Sebastian College – Recoletos de Cavite (1)	STI College	
2009–10	San Sebastian College – Recoletos de Cavite (2)	University of Manila	
2010–11	University of Manila (6)	STI College	
2011–12	University of Manila (7)	STI College	
2012–13	St. Clare College of Caloocan (1)	Central Escolar University	
2013–14	Central Escolar University (1)	St. Clare College of Caloocan	
2014–15	Central Escolar University (2)	St. Clare College of Caloocan	
2015–16	Central Escolar University (3)	St. Clare College of Caloocan	
2016–17	St. Clare College of Caloocan (2)	Our Lady of Fatima University	
2017–18	St. Clare College of Caloocan (3)	De Ocampo Memorial College	
2018–19	St. Clare College of Caloocan (4)	Enderun Colleges	
2019–20	St. Clare College of Caloocan (5)	Enderun Colleges	
2020–21	Not held due to the COVID-19 pandemic in the Philippines.		
2021–22	Not held due to the COVID-19 pandemic in the Philippines.		
2022–23	St. Clare College of Caloocan (6)	Enderun Colleges	
2023–24	St. Clare College of Caloocan (7)	Our Lady of Fatima University	
2024-25	St. Clare College of Caloocan (8)	Enderun Colleges	
