= List of colleges and universities in Metro Cebu =

This is a partial list of universities and colleges located within the Metro Cebu area only, Philippines.

Note:

- **Boldface** indicates a school which holds university status
- An asterisk (*) indicates a state school, college, or university
- A double asterisk (**) indicates a locally funded school, college, or university.

== Universities ==
=== A ===
- **Ateneo Graduate School of Business - Cebu Campus**

=== C ===
- **Cebu Doctors' University**
- **Cebu Institute of Technology–University**
- **Cebu Normal University***
- **Cebu Technological University*** (Main Campus)
  - Cebu Technological University – Danao Satellite Campus*
  - Cebu Technological University – City of Naga Extension Campus*
  - Cebu Technological University – San Fernando Extension Campus*

=== N ===
- **National University (NU Cebu)**

=== S ===
- **Southwestern University**

=== U ===
- **University of Cebu** (Main Campus)
  - University of Cebu – Banilad Campus
  - University of Cebu – Lapu-Lapu & Mandaue Campus
  - University of Cebu – Maritime Education and Training Center (METC)
  - University of Cebu – Pardo–Talisay Campus (formerly St. Paul College Foundation, Inc. – Bulacao Campus)
- **University of San Carlos** (Downtown Campus)
  - University of San Carlos – Talamban Campus (USC-TC)
- **University of San Jose–Recoletos** (Main Campus)
  - University of San Jose–Recoletos – Basak Campus
- **University of Southern Philippines Foundation**
- **University of the Philippines Cebu***
- **University of the Visayas** (Main Campus)
  - University of the Visayas – Danao Campus
  - University of the Visayas – Gullas College of Medicine
  - University of the Visayas – Mandaue Campus
  - University of the Visayas – Minglanilla Campus

== Colleges and institutes ==
=== A ===
- Academy for Creating Enterprise
- ACLC College of Mandaue
- AMA Computer College
- Asian College of Technology (Main Campus)
  - Asian College of Technology – Bulacao Campus
  - Asian College of Technology – Cyber Tower 2 Campus
  - Asian College of Technology – Pit-os Campus

=== B ===
- Baptist Theological College
- Benedicto College
  - Benedicto College – Mandaue City Campus
  - Benedicto College – Mandaue City Technical-Vocational and Senior High School Campus
  - Benedicto College – Cebu City Campus
- Benthel Asia School of Technology

=== C ===
- CBD College
- Cebu Aeronautical Technical School
- Cebu Eastern College
- Cebu Institute of Medicine
- Cebu Mary Immaculate College
- Cebu Roosevelt Memorial Colleges
- Cebu Sacred Heart College
  - Cebu Sacred Heart College – Talisay
  - Cebu Sacred Heart College – Carcar
- Cebu School of Midwifery
- Central Philippine Bible College, Inc.
- Centre for International Education Global Colleges
- Colegio de la Inmaculada Concepcion – Cebu
- Colegio de San Antonio de Padua
- Colegio del Santo Niño de Cebu
    - Colegio del Santo Niño – Augustinian
- College of Technological Sciences–Cebu
- Collegium Societatis Angeli Pacis
- Concord Technical Institute

=== D ===
- Don Bosco Technical College–Cebu

=== E ===
- Evangelical Theological College of the Philippines

=== G ===
- Golden Success College
- Gullas College of Medicine

=== I ===
- iACADEMY Cebu
- Immanuel Bible College
- Indiana School of Aeronautics (also known as Indiana Aerospace University)
- Informatics College Cebu
- Informatics Institute Consolacion, Cebu
- International Academy of Film and Television

=== L ===
- La Consolacion College Liloan
- Lapu-Lapu Cebu International College
- Lapu-Lapu City College**
- Larmen de Guia Memorial College
- Lyceum of Cebu

=== M ===
- Mandaue City College**
- Mary’s Children Formation College
- Matias H. Aznar Memorial College of Medicine
- Microsystems International Institute of Technology

=== N ===
- Northeastern Cebu Colleges

=== P ===
- Philippine State College of Aeronautics – Mactan Benito Ebuen Air Base*
- Professional Academy of the Philippines

=== R ===
- Rizwoods Colleges
- Royal Christian College

=== S ===
- San Roque College de Cebu
- Saint Catherine's College
- Saint Louis College–Cebu
- Saint Theresa's College of Cebu
- Salazar Colleges of Science and Institute of Technology (Main Campus)
  - SCSIT – Talisay Campus
- San Carlos Seminary College
- St. Cecilia's College–Cebu, Inc.
- St. Paul College Foundation, Inc.
  - SPCFI – Ramos Campus
  - SPCFI – Mandaue Campus
- STI College – Cebu
- Sto. Tomas College Danao City, Inc.
- Sibonga Community College

=== T ===
- Tabor Hills College
- Talisay City College**
- Trade-Tech International Science Institute

=== V ===
- Velez College
- Visayan Nazarene Bible College

== See also ==
- List of colleges and universities in Metro Manila
- List of colleges and universities in Davao City
- List of colleges and universities in the Philippines
- Higher education in the Philippines
