= 2022–23 CESAFI season =

- Paghiusa CESAFI 2022

Seniors' champions
Sport		Men	Women
- Basketball
- Volleyball

Juniors' champions
Sport		Boys	Girls
- Basketball
- Volleyball
- (NT) = No tournament; (DS) = Demonstration Sport; (Ex) = Exhibition;

The 2022–23 CESAFI season is the 23rd season of the Cebu Schools Athletic Foundation, Inc., the preeminent inter-scholastic sports competition in Cebu.

This season marks the return of the physical events of the CESAFI, which because of the COVID-19 pandemic had held its two previous seasons virtually. The season will mark the first appearance of University of the Philippines Cebu (UP Cebu) as a regular member. Aside from UP Cebu, the Sisters of Mary–Boystown and City of Bogo Science and Arts Academy will both compete in the high school division in select events as guest members. Southwestern University will take a leave of absence for this season, citing a lack of budget for its sports teams.

The season is set to open on October 15, 2022.

== Sports calendar ==
This is the calendar of sports events of the 2022–23 CESAFI season. The list includes the tournament duration and the venues.

Sport	Duration	Venue/s
Basketball	October 15–	Cebu Coliseum
Volleyball	October 22–	USPF Gym
Football	November 5–	Cebu City Sports Center
Tennis	November 12, 2022	CitiGreen Tennis Resort
Chess	November 19, 2022	Robinsons Galleria Cebu
Taekwondo	November 19, 2022	Insular Square Mall
Badminton	November 19–26, 2022	Metro Sports Center
Swimming	November 26, 2022	Cebu City Sports Center
Esports	November 26–27, 2022	SM Seaside
Table tennis	November 26–27, 2022	Robinsons Galleria Cebu
Dancesport	December 3, 2022	SM Seaside
Karatedo	December 3–4, 2022	SM Seaside
Scrabble	December 3–4, 2022	SM Seaside
Athletics	December 17–18, 2022	Cebu City Sports Center

== Basketball ==
Six teams will play in the college division, while ten teams will play in the high school division. Southwestern University (SWU) Cobras will not take part for this season, taking a leave for absence. University of the Philippines Cebu (UP Cebu) Fighting Maroons, which was supposed to play its first season in the CESAFI, withdrew its teams in college and high school basketball, citing a need for more time to field a more competitive team.

=== College tournament ===
In the college division, the six (6) teams will play each other twice in a double round-robin tournament for the elimination round for a total of ten (10) games for each team. The top four (4) teams will advance to the Final Four. Originally, seven (7) teams were supposed to compete, until the withdrawal of UP Cebu.

=== Elimination round ===
==== Team standings ====
Pos	Team	W	L	PCT	GB	Qualification
1	UV Green Lancers	8	2	.800	—	Twice-to-beat in the semifinals
2	USPF Panthers	7	3	.700	1	Twice-to-beat in the semifinals
3	UC Webmasters	5	5	.500	3	Twice-to-win in the semifinals
4	USJ-R Jaguars	5	5	.500	3	Twice-to-win in the semifinals
5	USC Warriors	4	6	.400	4	
6	CIT-U Wildcats	1	9	.100	7	

Updated to match(es) played on November 26, 2022. Source:
Rules for classification: 1) winning percentage; 2) head-to-head record; 3) head-to-head point differential; 4) overall point differential

==== Results ====
Results on top and to the right of the gray cells are from first-round games; those to the bottom and to the left of it are from second-round games.

Teams	CIT-U	UC	USC	USJ-R	USPF	UV
CIT-U Wildcats		77–95	79–70	66–83	63–52	90–69
UC Webmasters	78–67		65–60	84–78	66–60	71–76
USC Warriors	72–76*	80–77		81–67	67–72	64–91
USJ-R Jaguars	73–72	74–69	58–82		67–68	69–77
USPF Panthers	74–70	79–68	77–68	63–59		59–56
UV Green Lancers	87–61	85–66	75–59	86–64	86–68	

Updated to match(es) played on November 26, 2022. Source:
Legend: Blue = left column team win; Red = top row team win.
Matches with lighter background shading were decided after overtime.

=== Bracket ===
Semifinals (Nos. 1 & 2 have twice-to-beat advantage)
1	UV	78	64
4	USJ–R	80	51
2	USPF	67	57
3	UC	68	62

Finals (Best-of-three series)
1	UV	90
3	UC	62

=== Semifinals ===
The top 2 teams will have the twice-to-beat advantage; with them having to win only once, and their opponents twice, to advance.

==== UV vs USJR ====
December 8
5:00 p.m.

UV Green Lancers	78–80	USJ–R Jaguars

Cebu Coliseum, Cebu City

December 10
7:00 p.m.

UV Green Lancers	64–51	USJ–R Jaguars
UV wins series in two games

Cebu Coliseum, Cebu City

==== USPF vs UC ====
December 8
7:00 p.m.

USPF Panthers	67–68	UC Webmasters

Cebu Coliseum, Cebu City

December 10
5:00 p.m.

USPF Panthers	57–62	UC Webmasters
UC wins series in two games

Cebu Coliseum, Cebu City

=== Finals ===
The Finals is a best-of-three playoff.

December 11

UV Green Lancers	90–62	UC Webmasters

Cebu Coliseum, Cebu City

UV Green Lancers	vs.	UC Webmasters

Cebu Coliseum, Cebu City

UV Green Lancers	vs.	UC Webmasters*
UV leads series 1–0

Cebu Coliseum, Cebu City

*If necessary

=== High school tournament ===
In the high school division, the ten (10) teams will play each other once in a single round-robin tournament for the elimination round for a total of nine (9) games for each team. The top four (4) teams will advance to the Final Four. Originally, eleven (11) teams were supposed to compete, until the withdrawal of UP Cebu.

This marks the debut of the City of Bogo Science and Arts Academy (CBSAA) Trailblazers from Bogo, Cebu as a guest team.

==== Elimination round ====
===== Team standings =====
Pos	Team	W	L	PCT	GB	Qualification
1	CBSAA Trailblazers	9	0	1.000	—	Twice-to-beat in the semifinals
2	SHS-AdC Magis Eagles	8	1	.889	1	Twice-to-beat in the semifinals
3	UC Junior Webmasters	7	2	.778	2	Twice-to-win in the semifinals
4	UV Baby Green Lancers	5	4	.556	4	Twice-to-win in the semifinals
5	CIT-U Wildkittens	4	5	.444	5	
6	USPF Baby Panthers	4	4	.500	4.5	
7	CEC Dragons	3	6	.333	6	
8	USJ-R Baby Jaguars	3	6	.333	6	
9	UCLM Junior Webmasters	2	7	.222	7	
10	USC Baby Warriors	1	8	.111	8	

Updated to match(es) played on November 26, 2022. Source:
Rules for classification: 1) winning percentage; 2) head-to-head record; 3) head-to-head point differential; 4) overall point differential

===== Results =====
Teams	CBSAA	CEC	CIT-U	SHS-AdC	UC	UCLM	USC	USJ-R	USPF	UV
CBSAA Trailblazers		60–55	102–101	82–79	83–80	73–61	71–52	84–69	88–75	76–70
CEC Dragons			79–63	82–94	60–77	53–52	65–59	73–87	76–72	59–63
CIT-U Wildkittens				57–60	79–61	68–63	70–56	44–54	73–68	68–64
SHS-AdC Magis Eagles					85–78	86–68	82–74	77–58	84–62	86–75
UC Junior Webmasters						72–54	99–46	70–47	85–72	72–51
UCLM Junior Webmasters							53–51	73–66	66–79	66–81
USC Baby Warriors								49–64	49–72	73–104
USJ-R Baby Jaguars									91–89	78–92
USPF Baby Panthers										79–71
UV Baby Green Lancers										

Updated to match(es) played on November 26, 2022. Source:
Legend: Blue = left column team win; Red = top row team win.
Matches with lighter background shading were decided after overtime.

==== Bracket ====
Semifinals (Nos. 1 & 2 have twice-to-beat advantage)
1	CBSAA	67
4	UV	63
2	SHS-AdC	83
3	UC	78

Finals (Best-of-three series)
1	CBSAA	45
2	SHS-AdC	66

==== Semifinals ====
The top 2 teams will have the twice-to-beat advantage; with them having to win only once, and their opponents twice, to advance.

==== CBSAA vs UV ====
December 6
5:15 PM

CBSAA Trailblazers	67–63	UV Baby Green Lancers
CBSAA wins series in one game

Cebu Coliseum, Cebu City

==== SHS-AdC vs UC ====
December 6
7:15 PM

SHS-AdC Magis Eagles	83–78	UC Junior Webmasters
SHS-Ateneo wins series in one game

Cebu Coliseum, Cebu City

==== Finals ====
The Finals is a best-of-three playoff.

December 11
3:30 p.m.

CBSAA Trailblazers	45–66	SHS-AdC Magis Eagles

Cebu Coliseum, Cebu City

December 14
5:15 p.m.

CBSAA Trailblazers	vs.	SHS-AdC Magis Eagles

Cebu Coliseum, Cebu City

CBSAA Trailblazers	vs.	SHS-AdC Magis Eagles*
SHS-AdC leads series 1–0

Cebu Coliseum, Cebu City

*If necessary

== Volleyball ==
There will be 9 schools in the College Division (Both Men & Women)

=== Men's ===
- Cebu Doctors University
- Cebu Institute of Technology University
- University of Cebu
- University of Cebu - Lapu-Lapu & Mandaue Campus
- University of the Philippines Cebu
- University of the Visayas
- University of San Carlos
- University of San Jose-Recoletos
- University of Southern Philippines Foundation

=== Women's ===
- Cebu Doctors University
- Cebu Institute of Technology University
- University of Cebu
- University of Cebu - Lapu-Lapu & Mandaue Campus
- University of the Philippines Cebu
- University of the Visayas
- University of San Carlos
- University of San Jose-Recoletos
- University of Southern Philippines Foundation

== Football ==
There will be 4 teams in both High School & College Divisions This Season.

=== High School ===
- Don Bosco Technology Center
- Sacred Heart School-Ateneo de Cebu
- University of San Carlos
- University of San Jose-Recoletos

=== College ===
- University of Cebu
- University of San Carlos
- University of San Jose-Recoletos
- University of Southern Philippines Foundation
