= 2018–19 CESAFI season =

- Tagline: Cesafi @ 18: Millenial and Beyond

Seniors' champions
Sport		Men	Women
Basketball		UV	NT
Volleyball		SWU	USC
Athletics		UC	USC
Badminton		SWU	SWU
Beach volleyball		UV	USPF
Chess		USJ–R	USC
Dancesport (Co-ed)		UC	
Football		USC	NT
Futsal (DS)		NT	NT
Karate kata		USJ–R	USC
Karate kumite		USJ–R	USC
Scrabble (Co-ed)		UV	
Swimming		USC	USC
Taekwondo		UC	UC
Weightlifting (DS)		UC	UC

Juniors' champions
Sport		Boys	Girls
Basketball		SHS-AdC	NT
Volleyball		USPF	USJ–R
Athletics		USC-BED	UC
Beach volleyball		USPF	USJ–R
Chess		USC-BED	USC-BED
Dancesport (Co-ed)		UC	
Football		SHS-AdC	NT
Futsal (DS)		NT	SHS-AdC
Karate kata		UC	USC-BED
Karate kumite		UC	USC-BED
Scrabble (Co-ed)		USJ–R	
Swimming		SHS-AdC	UC
Taekwondo		UC	UC
Weightlifting (DS)		SMS-Boystown	NT
- (NT) = No tournament; (DS) = Demonstration Sport; (Ex) = Exhibition;

The 2018–19 CESAFI season was the 18th season of the Cebu Schools Athletic Foundation, Inc., the preeminent inter-scholastic sports competition in Cebu. The 2018–19 season will be the first season of the CESAFI under president Bernard Nicolas Villamor, of Cebu Institute of Technology–University.

This season marks the first appearance of University of Cebu – Lapu-Lapu and Mandaue Campus (UC–LM) as a regular member. UC–LM will compete as a separate school from sister school University of Cebu, but will carry the same nickname as the latter, the Webmasters. Aside from UC–LM, the Sisters of Mary–Boystown will also compete in select events as a guest member.

For the first time in the league's history, an Under-12 Division will be added to the fold, with basketball, chess, and football being the inaugural sports in the new division. In addition, weightlifting will also be making its debut as a demonstration sport.

== Basketball ==
=== Men's basketball ===
==== Elimination round ====
Pos	Team	Pld	W	L	GF	GA	GD	PCT	GB	Qualification
1	USJ–R Jaguars	12	9	3	983	860	+123	.750 (Note: USJ-R 1.084, UV 0.997 UC 0.919)	—	Twice-to-beat in the semifinals
2	UV Green Lancers	12	9	3	946	850	+96	.750	—	Twice-to-beat in the semifinals
3	UC Webmasters	12	9	3	810	753	+57	.750	—	Twice-to-win in the semifinals
4	USC Warriors	12	5	7	899	853	+46	.417 (Note: USC 1.029, USPF 0.972)	4	Twice-to-win in the semifinals
5	USPF Panthers	12	5	7	811	842	−31	.417	4	
6	CIT-U Wildcats	12	3	9	849	1042	−193	.250	6	
7	SWU Cobras	12	2	10	725	823	−98	.167	7	

Rules for classification: 1) winning percentage; 2) quotient (points for divided by points against) of combined results between tied teams

===== Results =====
Results on top and to the right of the gray cells are from first-round games; those to the bottom and to the left of it are from second-round games.

Team	CIT-U	SWU	UC	USC	USJ-R	USPF	UV
CIT-U Wildcats		53–87	67–81	55–102	69–90	67–73	69–98
SWU Cobras	68–71		49–66	56–66	65–77	59–62	49–68
UC Webmasters	75–81	67–57		72–50	72–64	55–45	72–65
USC Warriors	77–82	82–60	65–69		93–101	77–79	69–73
USJ-R Jaguars	106–77	80–60	74–57	65–74		70–61	89–73
USPF Panthers	87–79	61–64	56–65	60–66	75–84		81–80
UV Green Lancers	98–79	70–51	80–59	81–78	84–83	76–71	

Legend: Blue = left column team win; Red = top row team win.

==== Playoffs ====
===== Bracket =====
Semifinals (Nos. 1 & 2 have twice-to-beat advantage)
1	USJ–R	80
4	USC	66
2	UV	64
3	UC	62

Finals (Best-of-three series)
1	USJ–R	74	68	61
2	UV	78	58	74

===== Semifinals =====
====== USJ-R vs. USC ======
October 20, 2018
4:30 p.m

Match report

USJ–R Jaguars	80–66	USC Warriors
USJ-R wins series in one game

Cebu Coliseum, Cebu City

====== UV vs. UC ======
October 20, 2018
6:30 p.m

Match report

UV Green Lancers	64–62	UC Webmasters
UV wins series in one game

Cebu Coliseum, Cebu City

===== Third-place game =====
October 25, 2018
5:00 p.m

Match report

UC Webmasters	96–103 (OT)	USC Warriors
USC wins third-place game

Cebu Coliseum, Cebu City

===== Finals =====
This is the fifth finals meeting in the CESAFI between USJ-R and UV, with all four previous meetings in 2002, 2003, 2004, and 2008 being the most recent, all won by UV. UV won the series in three games, its third title in three years, completing a three-peat, as well as winning their 13th CESAFI men's basketball title.

October 25, 2018
7:15 p.m

Match report

USJ–R Jaguars	74–78	UV Green Lancers

Cebu Coliseum, Cebu City

October 27, 2018
6:00 p.m.

Match report

UV Green Lancers	58–68	USJ–R Jaguars

Cebu Coliseum, Cebu City

October 29, 2018
6:00 p.m.

Match report

USJ–R Jaguars	61–74	UV Green Lancers
UV wins series 2–1

Cebu Coliseum, Cebu City

==== Awards ====
- Most Valuable Player: Rey Anthony Suerte (UV Green Lancers)
