= Primitivo =

Primitivo may refer to:

== Agriculture ==
- Primitivo (grape), a variety of black-skinned wine grape, best known as Zinfandel
- Primitivo Nero, a wine grape variety
- Primitivo di Manduria, a wine produced in Apulia, Italy

== People ==
- Ricardo Primitivo González, Argentine basketball player
- Primitivo Lázaro, Spanish pianist
- Primitivo Maradiaga, Honduran football player
- Primitivo Martínez, Filipino basketball player
- Primitivo Mijares, Filipino journalist
- Primitivo Ríos Vázquez, Mexican politician
- Primitivo Viray, President of Ateneo de Naga University

== Film ==
- L'Amore Primitivo, a 1964 comedy

== Music ==
- Primitivo Soul!, 1963 album by Sonny Stitt
- Primitivo (album), 1965 album by Arsenio Rodríguez
- Primitivo, 2007 EP by Lucybell

== See also ==
- Camino Primitivo, a pilgrim way in Spain, part of the route of St. James
