= COVID-19 pandemic in Central Visayas =

Ongoing COVID-19 viral pandemic in Central Visayas, the Philippines

- Disease: COVID-19
- Pathogen: SARS-CoV-2
- Location: Central Visayas
- First outbreak: Wuhan, Hubei, China
- Index case: Tagbilaran, Bohol
- Arrival date: February 5, 2020 (6 years, 3 months, 1 week and 6 days)
- Confirmed cases: ▲206,783
- Active cases: ▼285
- Recovered: ▲203,579
- Deaths: ▲6,685

Government website
- ro7.doh.gov.ph

The COVID-19 pandemic in Central Visayas is part of the worldwide pandemic of coronavirus disease 2019 (COVID-19) caused by severe acute respiratory syndrome coronavirus 2 (SARS-CoV-2). The virus reached Central Visayas on February 5, 2020, when the first case of the disease was confirmed in Bohol. As of May 2, 2023, there have been 210,549 cases in Central Visayas with 6,685 deaths.

== Timeline ==
=== 2020 ===
The first two confirmed cases of COVID-19 in the Philippines were Chinese tourists admitted to a hospital in Metro Manila both of whom had history of traveling to Dumaguete and Cebu. The first recorded case in Central Visayas, and the third case confirmed overall in the country, was confirmed on February 5, 2020. The case was that of a 60-year-old woman who had since recovered from the disease at the time of the announcement and was then allowed to return to China on January 31. The woman, a native of Wuhan, China had a brief travel history to Cebu and Bohol provinces. The woman was admitted to a private hospital in Tagbilaran on January 22. Samples collected from the patient on January 24 tested negative for COVID-19 but a second testing conducted (this time on samples collected a day before), tested positive for the virus. No new cases were reported in Bohol.

The first cases confirmed in Negros Oriental and Cebu were on March 11 and 18 respectively.

In late April 2020, there had been a surge of confirmed cases in Cebu especially in high population density urban-poor areas, resulting in a massive lockdown for the residents. By April 30, there were 312 confirmed cases among the population of the Cebu City Jail alone. By May 3, there were a total of 990 confirmed cases in the whole Central Visayas region most of which were in Cebu City (875 cases). On May 8, another densely populated area settled by over 5,000 informal settlers was placed in lockdown with 539 cases. The same day also pegged Cebu City with a total of 1,388 cases.

Cebu City briefly became the Philippine city with the most number of COVID-19 cases on May 10 with 1,571 cases, surpassing Quezon City, which had 1,558 cases at the time.

After months of not reporting any cases, Bohol confirmed its second case on May 13. The case was that of an Overseas Filipino Worker repatriated from overseas to the province.

Cebu and three of its associated independent cities remained under ECQ (enhanced community quarantine) on May 1, 2020. On May 16, Cebu City and Mandaue remained under ECQ as eight other areas in the country were placed under modified ECQ and the rest of the country under GCQ. The ECQ in Cebu City was extended for the entire month of June 2020 and ended on July 15.

On June 27, a religious procession and fiesta was held in Sitio Alumnos, Barangay Basak San Nicholas despite the enhanced community quarantine. Fourteen public officials were summoned by authorities for this clear violation of quarantine protocols.

The following day, on June 28, a separate unrelated fiesta was held in Barangay Calamba. Leaked videos and photos showed a group of people dancing in a basketball court while drinking alcohol. Since the quarantine came into effect last March, gatherings such as parties and the drinking of alcohol was prohibited. 19 individuals were charged for breaking quarantine and social distancing protocols while the barangay captain was summoned by the DILG to explain how this event managed to push through.

Siquijor became the last province in Central Visayas to log its first case. Its first two cases were returnees from Metro Manila and was announced on August 2.

On September 7, DOH announced that Central Visayas had started to flatten the curve.

On October 2, Siquijor logged its fourth case from a locally stranded individual

In the beginning of October 2020, with the decreasing trend of new cases in Cebu City, health officials stated that herd immunity may have been achieved.

Despite strict measures, these were eventually relaxed for the Christmas season. As of the first nine days of January 2021, confirmed cases of COVID-19 resurged for Cebu. Officials may call for another lockdown by February.

=== 2021 ===
On March 1, 2021, over 7,200 doses of CoronaVac by Sinovac Biotech arrived in Cebu City. Vaccinations for frontliners began immediately.

On March 10, 2021, the first batch of 30,000 Oxford–AstraZeneca COVID-19 vaccines arrived.

== Response ==
=== Local government ===
==== Cebu ====
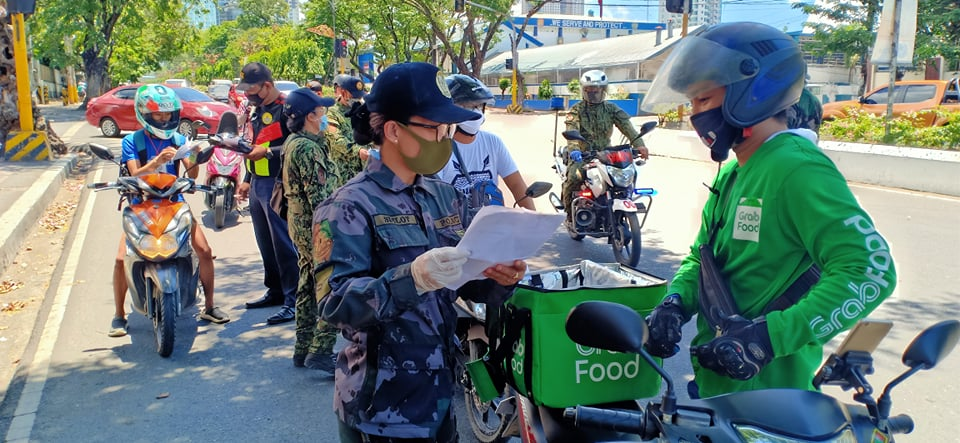
Police checks documents presented to them by drivers in a checkpoint in Cebu City.

On March 13, the mayors of Cebu City, Mandaue, and Lapu-Lapu suspended classes in all levels for both private and public schools as a preventive measure against the spread of the virus. The suspension of classes in Cebu City and Lapu-Lapu was scheduled until March 28. Schools, however, were required to implement distance education measures.

On March 15, Cebu Governor Gwendolyn Garcia announced the imposition of a province-wide curfew from 10 p.m. to 5 a.m. the following day. Garcia also announced that Mactan–Cebu International Airport and the Port of Cebu would suspend all arrivals and departures of domestic passenger travel, effective March 17. She added that residents of Cebu would still be allowed to depart the island province, but they would only be allowed to re-enter after 30 days. That same day, Cebu City Mayor Edgardo Labella placed the city under a general community quarantine from March 16 to April 14; under the quarantine, health checkpoints would be established in the city's 11 entry points, the suspension of classes in the city was extended until April 14, and a four-day workweek was scheduled for city government workers from 8 a.m. to 6 p.m.

On March 16, following the imposition of a general community quarantine in Cebu City, Mayor Labella issued an executive order prohibiting the sale, distribution, and consumption of alcoholic beverages in all public places.

On March 19, Mayor Labella ordered the temporary closure of all commercial establishments in the city, including all malls and the Cebu City Sports Complex but excluding establishments providing essential goods and services, until the end of the "general community quarantine".

On March 25, Governor Garcia signed Executive Order No. 5-N placing the entire Cebu province under enhanced community quarantine from March 27.

On April 8, Lapu Lapu City Mayor Junard "Ahong" Chan issued an Executive Order extending the implementation of the enhanced community quarantine (ECQ) until April 28, 2020.

On April 14, Cebu City Mayor Edgardo Labella pushed the extension of the implementation of the enhanced community quarantine (ECQ) for the City up to April 28, 2020. On April 16, two armored personnel carriers from the Philippine Army were deployed to guard the entrances and exits of Sitio Zapatera which is home to 10,000 residents, mostly informal settlers, after the entire barangay was assumed to be infected.

A private initiative called Bayanihan Cebu PH has set up quarantine facilities known as Bayanihan Field Centers for COVID-19 patients in Cebu which are to be run by the Central Visayas field office of the Department of Health. The first two centers were set up at the IC3 Convention Center and the Sacred Heart School-Ateneo de Cebu's satellite campus.

Due to the increase of cases in Cebu despite the ECQ, tougher measures were enacted. One June 22, President Duterte ordered Roy Cimatu, Secretary of the Department of Environment and Natural Resources, to lead and oversee the COVID-19 response. Backed by soldiers of the Philippine Army, operatives from the Philippine National Police's Special Action Force, and armored vehicles, patrols were made in areas where there were numerous cases or reported quarantine violators such as Barangay Luz, Barangay Alaska Mambaling, Barangay Calamba, and Barangay San Nicholas. IATF officials also conducted aerial surveys of Cebu City in conjunction with the Philippine Air Force.

Another M-ECQ was declared from August 1 to August 31, 2021, due to the third wave of cases. It was extended until September 15, 2021.

==== Bohol ====
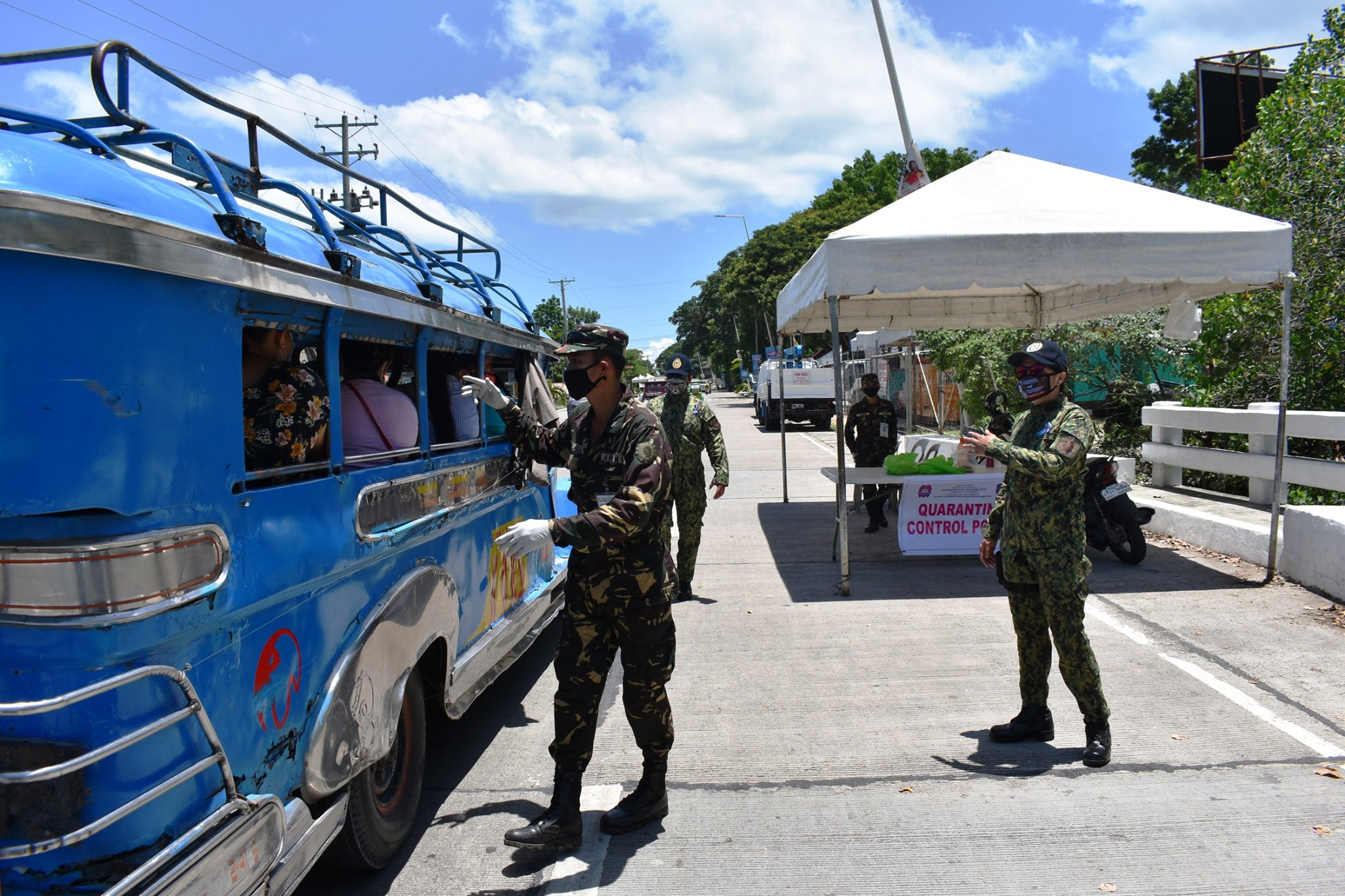
Police officers in Bohol checking passengers of a jeepney passing through a quarantine checkpoint.

On March 16, 2020, Bohol community quarantine had started, Governor Arthur Yap announced to be effective until April 12. Province-wide curfew starts from 9 pm until 5 am.

On April 7, 2020, According to Provincial Administrator Kathyrin Pioquinto they will extend the implementation of the enhanced community quarantine (ECQ) and planning to extend the quarantine until April 30, 2020.

==== Negros Oriental ====
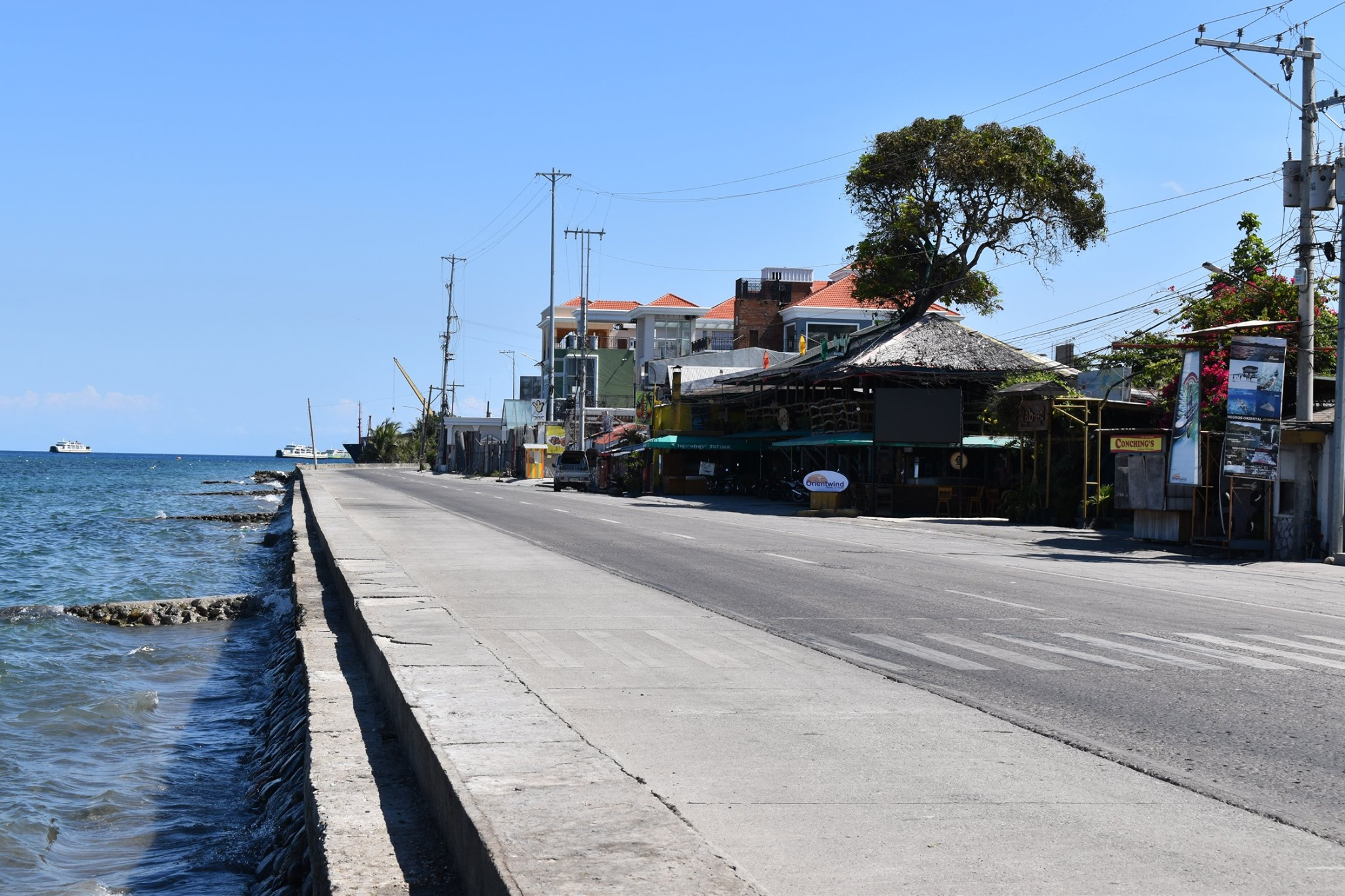
An empty street in Dumaguete on April 14, which at that time the city was under ECQ.

On March 31, Negros Oriental Governor Roel Degamo signed an executive order placing the entire province under enhanced community quarantine from April 3 to 18. Under the said order, residents must stay at home, limit the business hours for selected establishments, and suspending the mass public transit, and restrict land and sea travel among others.

== Religion ==
All Holy Week activities were cancelled, with masses being streamed virtually on television, YouTube, and social media. On April 9, 2020, over a hundred individuals were spotted to be crowding in Carbon market for binignit ingredients.

During the Christmas season, Misa de Gallo masses were intended for limited capacity for the churchgoers while social distancing would be implemented. Despite this, crowds of churchgoers still gathered at outside the premises of churches. The first two days alone would attract of 36,000 individuals. On December 24, event organizers declared Misa de Gallo as a "success" despite the strict social distancing protocols and overcrowding.

There were a lot of changes to be made during the annual Sinulog festival. Since 2018, plans for the "grandest" Sinulog Festival were scheduled for March 2021 instead of January to mark 500 years of Christianity reaching the Philippines. For the months leading to the festival, there were discussions to hold the masses, parade, and contingent dances virtually. On the start of the novena, crowds of churchgoers flocked to Basilica Minore Del Santo Nino in a similar fashion to the Misa de Gallo masses held during the Christmas season. IATF officials and Cebu's medical community criticized the event of recklessness due to the lack of social distancing protocols being observed. On January 10, 2021, the Sinulog Foundation Inc. announced that all Sinulog activities would be cancelled for good. On January 11, 2021, all physical novena masses were ceased. Instead the masses were streamed virtually.

The Spanish Navy training ship Juan Sebastián de Elcano was not open to visitors when it docked in Cebu City from March 20–22, 2021 due to the pandemic. The ship's crew were not allowed to disembark. Instead, an invite-only ceremony was held at Pier 8 attended by military officers, officials, delegates from the Spanish consulate, and cultural performers.

== Sports ==
The 2020 season of the multi-sport collegiate league Cebu Schools Athletic Foundation, Inc. was cancelled.
