= LLCC =

LLCC may mean:

- Lapu-Lapu City College, the Philippines
- Leadless chip carrier, a type of chip carrier
- Lincoln Land Community College, Springfield, Illinois, USA
- Lindbergh LaVista Corridor Coalition, Atlanta, Georgia, USA; see Lindridge/Martin Manor
- Long Lake Conservation Center, a List of nature centers in Minnesota in Palisade, Minnesota, USA
- Low labour cost country, a country with lower labour and production costs
- Low-level circulation center, part of a tropical cyclone
