= Lourdes Libres Rosaroso =

Filipino broadcaster (1935–2010)

- Born: February 11, 1935; Alicia, Bohol, Philippine Islands
- Died: August 20, 2010 (aged 75); Cebu City, Philippines
- Education: Medical Doctor, Educator, Lawyer
- Occupation: Broadcaster
- Notable work: Kini ang Akong Suliran
- Children: 6

Lourdes Libres Rosaroso (11 February 1935 – 20 August 2010) was a Filipino radio broadcaster, lawyer, and doctor. Rosaroso was also an educator, being the owner of the St. Paul College Foundation, Inc. (now the University of Cebu – Pardo–Talisay) which also had campuses in different parts of Metro Cebu.

Rosaroso was popular for her radio program Kini ang Akong Suliran (This Is My Problem), which ran for almost 35 years. The program provided assistance for underprivileged listeners with their medical and legal problems. Broadcast on many Cebu-based radio stations, the program aired longest on radio DyHP under the Radio Mindanao Network (RMN).

Aside from being a broadcaster, Rosaroso also established herself as an educator, through her St. Paul College Foundation Inc., which she formed in 1985.
