= Saint Stephen's High School =

Private school in Metro Manila, Philippines

St. Stephen's High School

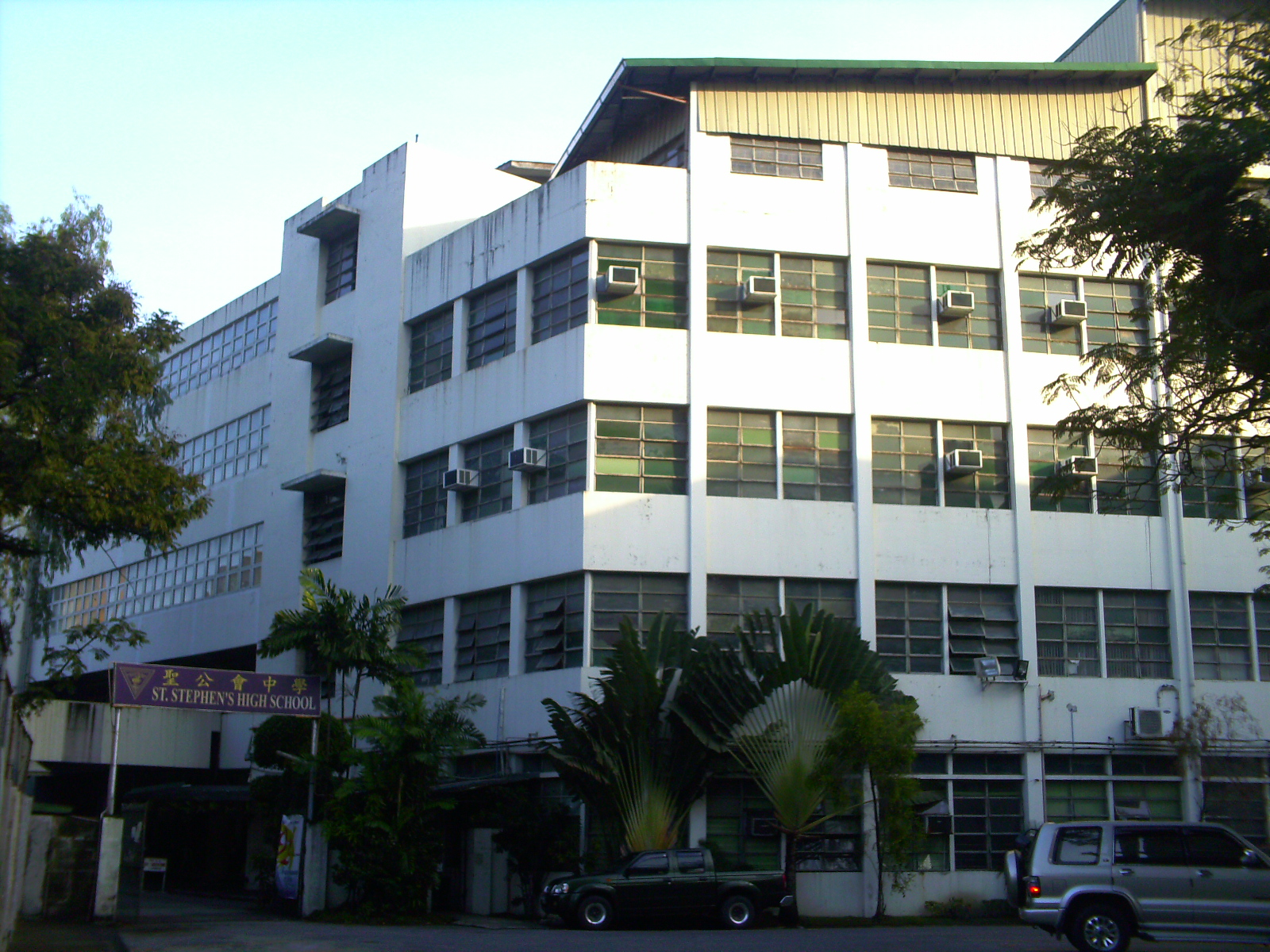

Location
- 1267 Guillermo Masangkay St., Santa Cruz, Manila; Philippines
- Coordinates: 14.6084°N 120.9780°E

Information
- Religious affiliations: Christian (Protestant), Nondenominational
- Denomination: Episcopalian
- Established: 1917
- Chaplain: Rev. Dr. Patrick Tanhuanco
- Grades: Nursery to Grade 12
- Language: English, Filipino, Chinese
- Campus size: 2 hectares
- Colours: Violet and White
- Accreditation: Level III (Highest Level) Accreditation Status as certified by the FAAP (Federation of Accrediting Agencies of the Philippines) through the ACSCU-AAI
- Affiliation: Association of Chinese-Filipino Schools in the Philippines; Association of Christian Schools International; Association of Christian Schools, Colleges and Universities - Accrediting Agency Inc
- Website: www.sshs.edu.ph

St. Stephen's High School (simplified Chinese: 圣公会中学; traditional Chinese: 聖公會中學; Pe̍h-ōe-jī: Sèng-kong-hoē Tiong-o̍h) is an Episcopalian school, located in the Binondo district of Manila. It is considered the first Christian Chinese school established in Luzon. The school offers courses of study from Pre-Kinder to Grade 12.

== History ==
In 1903, St. Stephen's Church of Manila was established. It was run by the American Episcopal Mission in the Philippines headed by Bishop Charles Henry Brent. The church first opened a night school for young men which operated from 1905 to 1909. The church leaders then decided to focus on girls' education after seeing that there were no schools for girls at the time.

Originally known as St. Stephen's Girls' School, it was founded on July 22, 1917. It was known as Seng Kong Hoe in the Chinese community and had 19 enrollees. The first class was held at a church property along Reina Regente Street.

By 1921, 150 girls were enrolled. The following year, eight girls became the first to receive their diplomas from the school. The school continued to expand with the establishment of their elementary department and English and Chinese high school department in 1925. By 1927, the school had 305 students. In 1939, the school moved to Calle Magdalena from its original location. A mission home and a 15-room building were constructed by 1941, with a renovated row of dormitory units.

But later that year, on December 8, 1941, the school operations had to stop during the Japanese occupation in the Philippines. The Japanese military sealed off the school compound and the mission house was turned over to a Japanese doctor-director of St. Luke's Hospital. The occupants were forced to move out and the rooms were used for Japanese civilian patients. American and British school staff became prisoners of war and were confined at the University of Santo Tomas. The new building, which was not yet used was demolished and its new materials and equipment taken. Chinese guerrilla units later took the mission house and used it as headquarters during the liberation from Japanese occupation.

The school reopened in December 1945 after the war under the direction of Huang Ong Bi Gim. St. Stephen's Girls' School offered its service to those unschooled for five years as contribution to the community and nation-building. Nancy L. Yao became the principal in 1946 and Constance Bolderston was the directress. Rebuilding followed and it was officially renamed St. Stephen's High School. In 1963, a new five-storey high school building was completed. By 1969, an additional building with three storeys was built for elementary students. By 1967, enrollment grew to 3,400. A five-storey annex building was completed in 1982. Old elementary school buildings were replaced by two new buildings, which were constructed in 1991 and 1994.

== Accreditation ==
Since 1976, St. Stephen's is recognized by the Philippine Government as a Chinese Filipino school offering English, Filipino and Chinese subjects in the preschool, elementary and high school departments. It is an accredited school of Association of Christian Schools, Colleges and Universities (ACSCU-AAI). It is also one of the founding members of the Association of Chinese-Filipino Schools in the Philippines.

== Academics ==
In 1960, St. Stephen's high school graduation class ranked in the top 10% of the country's seniors after a national government examination was held. In 2011, the school ranked ninth overall in the national career assessment examination.

== Student life ==
Aside from the classrooms, the school has facilities like an auditorium, the Stephenian Hall (a multi-purpose hall), the Nancy L. Yao Library, an electronic research center, speech laboratory, the Wai Ling Tan Audio-Visual Center, a guidance and counseling center, science laboratories, journalism room, typing room, home economics room, clinic, scout center, four computer laboratories, music room, practical arts room, the Ching Siok Gok (CSG) Gymnasium, an indoor and outdoor playground, and the Jimmy Go swimming pool.

=== Athletics ===
The school has varsity teams in swimming, track and field, volleyball, badminton, table tennis and basketball. Their basketball teams have seen success in leagues such as the Metro Manila Tiong Lian Basketball Association (MMTLBA), where they won five titles under head coach Goldwin Monteverde. They also compete in the Filipino-Chinese Amateur Athletic Federation, the Philippine Ching Yuen Athletic Association, and the Women's National Collegiate Athletic Association.

=== Extracurricular activities ===
St. Stephen's has a drama club. It has staged plays such as The King and I, South Pacific, and Cyrano de Bergerac. It also has a glee club, which won the Himig ng Lahi competition in 1976. The Stephenian Math Society hosts the Lord of the Math Inter-school Competition annually at the Stephenian Hall which began in 2005. The school has served as host for training sessions held by the Mathematics Trainers' Guild (MTG) for several years. Several students have gone on to compete in international math contests. Other clubs include the Girls' Friendly Society, Boy Scouts, the Acolytes, and the Altar Guild.

== Notable students and alumni ==
- Katrina Halili - actress and model
- Christian Luanzon - basketball player
- Kent Lao - basketball player
- LJ Reyes - actress
- Trisha Co Reyes - artist

== Gallery ==
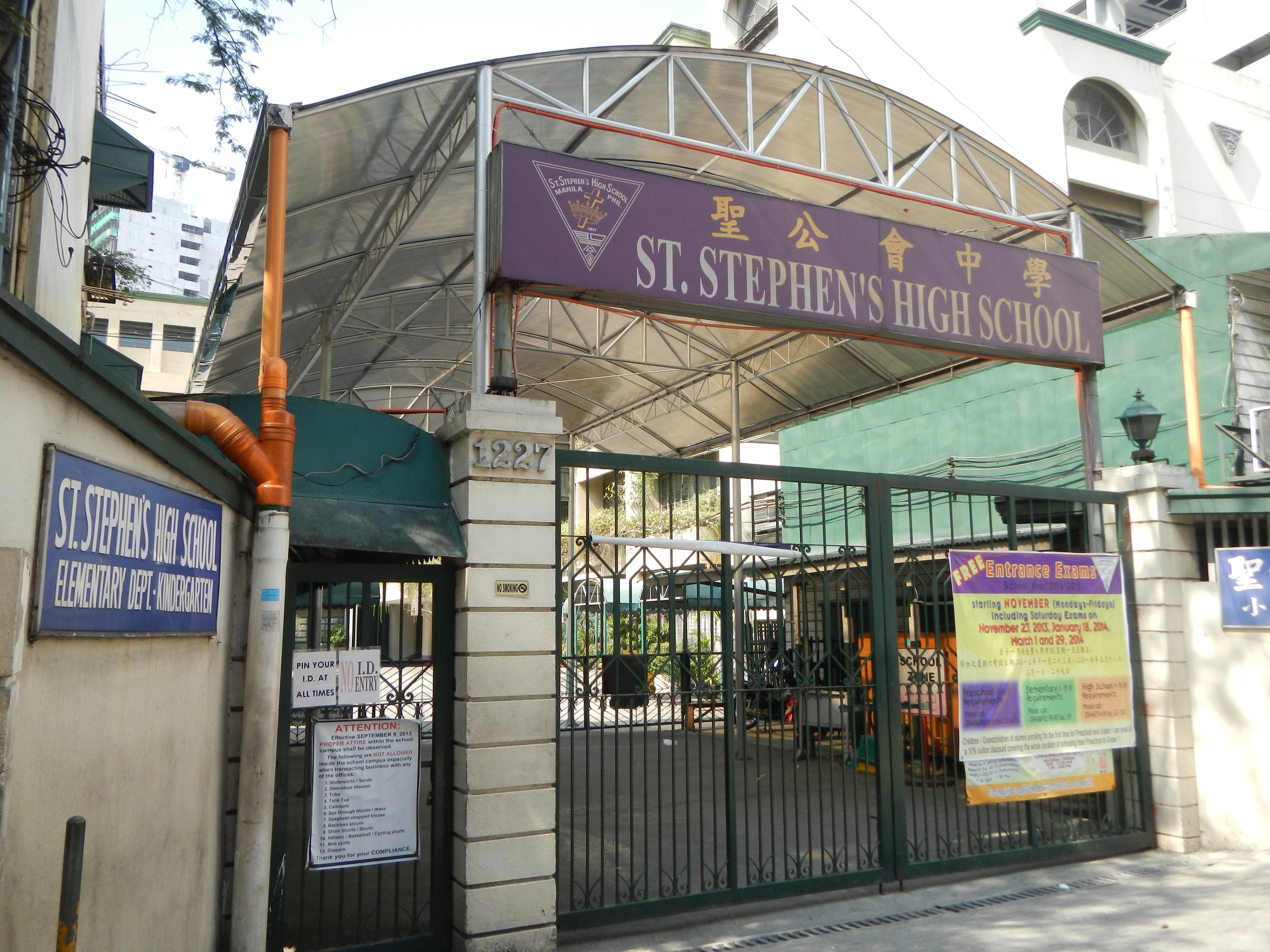
Entrance to the Campus

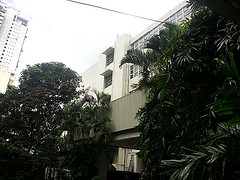
Main Building Facade

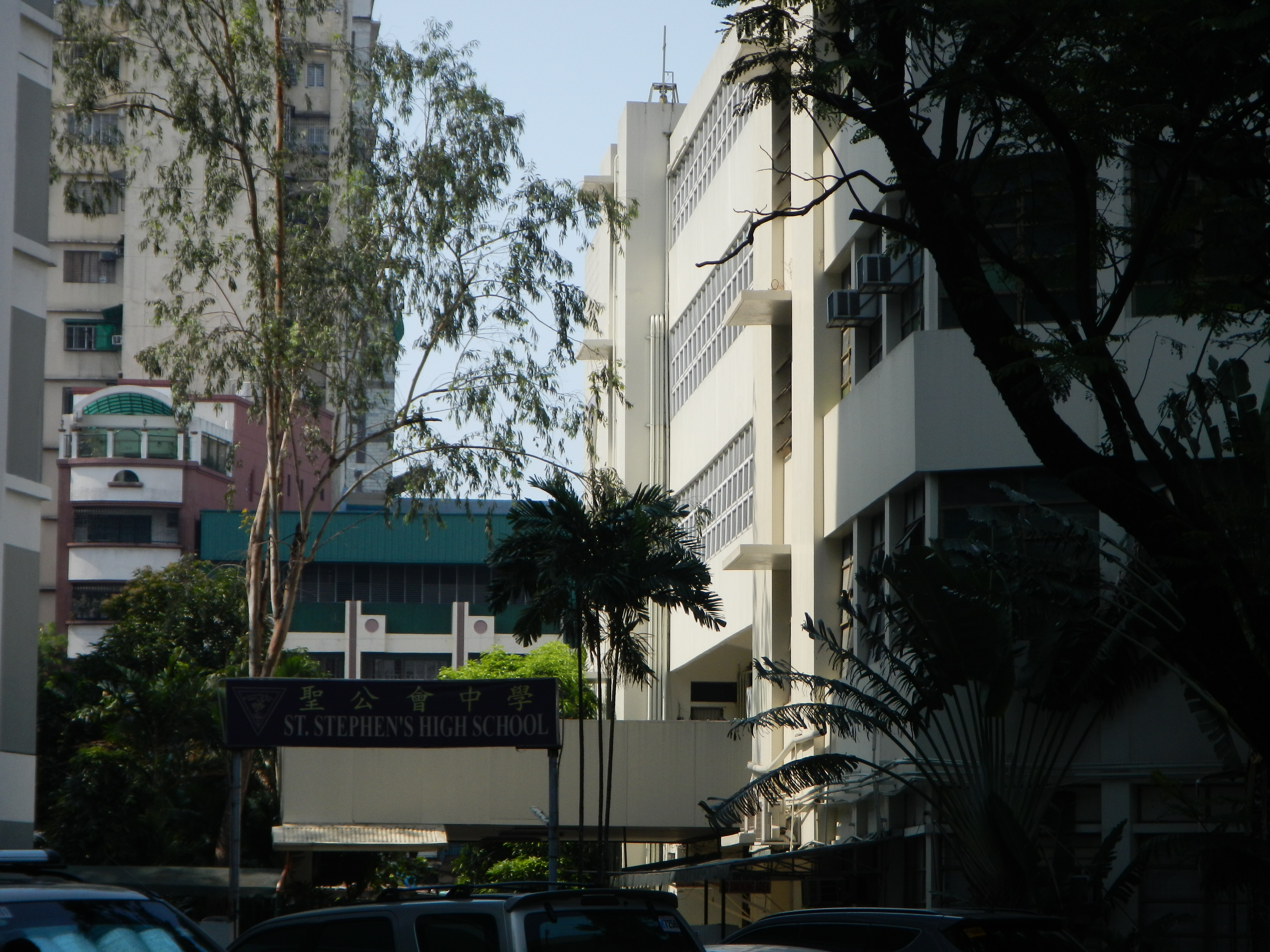
Main Building Side View

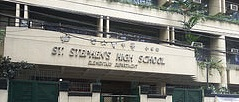
Elementary Building

Preceded by Cebu Eastern College; September 1915	Oldest Chinese School in the Philippines; Sixth; July 22, 1917	Succeeded by Philippine Scholastic Academy (as Annex of Anglo-Chinese School); August 7, 1917
