= Cebu Schools Athletic Foundation, Inc. =

Collegiate athletic association in Cebu province, Philippines

- Upcoming season or competition: CESAFI Season 26
- Sport: Various
- Founded: 2000
- First season: 2001
- President: Francisco Antonio Estepa
- Commissioner: Felix Tiukinhoy, Jr.
- No. of teams: 18
- Country: Philippines
- Website: www.cesafi.ph

The Cebu Schools Athletic Foundation, Inc. (CESAFI) is a sports and academic association of 18 schools, colleges and universities in Cebu, Philippines.

== History ==
The Cebu Schools Athletic Foundation, Inc. (CESAFI) was established in 2000 as Cebu's primary inter-school tournament. It supplanted the defunct Cebu Amateur Athletic Association (CAAA) which ran from the 1930s to 2000.

CESAFI is the province's counterpart to Metro Manila's University Athletic Association of the Philippines (UAAP) with the CESAFI becoming known for its basketball championship.

The new league was announced on July 2001 with Baldomero Estenzo as its first commissioner. CESAFI's first set of officers were sworn in on September 2001 by Jose Gullas.

In 2015, Southwestern University was found to have fielded overaged basketball players in their high school team after it was discovered that nine of its players have submitted the tampered versions of their birth certificates. The school withdrew from the high school division and apologized for the incident. SWU returned to the high school division the following year.

In the 2018–19 season, the University of Cebu – Lapu-Lapu and Mandaue Campus became the thirteenth member school to join the CESAFI tournament.

The CESAFI was one of the many sports leagues affected by the COVID-19 pandemic. The pandemic forced the league to cancel its 2020 season. It was not also held in 2021.

In 2022, the University of the Philippines Cebu confirmed its participation in the CESAFI, becoming its 14th member school. Also in the same year, CESAFI Esports League was also inaugurated. It is the first collegiate esports competition in the Philippines that is under the supervision of athletic directors from CESAFI member schools.

After the 2023-24 season, Southwestern University PHINMA Cobras announced their departure from the league.

== Member schools ==
=== Current ===
There are a total of sixteen member schools in the college division.

In the high school division there are thirteen members. All ten schools in the college division have a team in the high school division. Sacred Heart School – Ateneo de Cebu, as a K-12 school, is the only member without an affiliated team in the college division, while Velez College does not have a high school division affiliate.

Institution	Location	Founded	Type	Collegiate division	High school division	School colors
Benedicto College	Mandaue	2000	Private	Cheetahs	Baby Cheetahs	
Cebu Eastern College	Cebu City	1915	Private	Dragons	Baby Dragons	
Cebu Doctors' University	Mandaue	1973	Private	White Stallions		
Cebu Institute of Technology – University	Cebu City	1946	Private	Wildcats	Junior Wildcats	
Cebu Roosevelt Memorial Colleges	Bogo	1947	Private	Mustangs	Baby Mustangs	
Don Bosco Technical College	Cebu City	1954	Private (Salesian)	Greywolves	Baby Greywolves	
Felipe R. Verallo Foundation College	Bogo	1988	Private	Blue Dragons		
PAREF Springdale School	Cebu City	1996	Private (Opus Dei)	—N/a	Titans	
Sacred Heart School – Ateneo de Cebu	Mandaue	1955	Private (Jesuits)	—N/a	Magis Eagles	
The Sisters of Mary School-Boystown (guest)	Minglanilla, Cebu	1992	Private (Sisters of Mary)	—N/a	Aloysian Eagles	
University of Cebu	Cebu City	1964	Private	Webmasters	Junior Webmasters	
University of Cebu – Lapu-Lapu & Mandaue Campus	Mandaue	1995	Private	UC–LM Webmasters	UCLM Junior Webmasters	
University of San Carlos	Cebu City	1595	Private (Society of the Divine Word)	Warriors	Baby Warriors	
University of San Jose–Recoletos	Cebu City	1947	Private (Augustinian Recollect)	Jaguars	Jaguar Cubs	
University of Southern Philippines Foundation	Cebu City	1927	Private	Panthers	Baby Panthers	
University of the Philippines Cebu	Cebu City	1918	Public	Fighting Maroons	Junior Fighting Maroons	
University of the Visayas	Cebu City	1919	Private	Green Lancers	Baby Lancers	
Velez College	Cebu City	1966	Private	Present	—N/a	

=== Former ===
Institution	Location	Founded	Joined	Last season	Type	Collegiate division	High school division	School colors
City of Bogo Science and Arts Academy (probationary)	Bogo, Cebu	2012	2022	2023	Public	—N/a	Trailblazers	
Southwestern University PHINMA	Cebu City	1946	2000	2024	Private	Cobras	Baby Cobras	

== Venue ==
The Cebu Coliseum has been the traditional venue for the basketball tournament of CESAFI.

== Events ==
The CESAFI sets itself apart from other Philippine inter-school leagues as aside from its sporting events, it also holds academic and cultural events, which are contested and participated by all of its member schools. As of 2018, CESAFI has 15 sporting events, and 14 academic and cultural events.

=== Sports ===
The league, as of 2018, has ten schools competing in 15 different sports:

- Athletics
- Badminton
- Basketball
- Beach volleyball
- Chess
- Dancesport
- Football
- Futsal
- Karatedo
- Lawn tennis
- Swimming
- Table tennis
- Taekwondo
- Volleyball
- Weightlifting

The league also plans to add golf, weightlifting and bowling in the far future. Unlike the University Athletic Association of the Philippines and the National Collegiate Athletic Association, CESAFI teams do not compete for an overall championship.

=== Academic and cultural events ===
As of the 2018 season, CESAFI has twelve schools competing in 14 academic and cultural events. These events consist of the following:

- Bangga sa Balak
- Sangka sa Pakigpulung
- Current events & general information quiz
- Declamation
- Essay writing
- Hip-hop dancing
- Impromptu speaking
- Math quiz bee
- Oration
- Robotics
- Science quiz bee
- Sudoku
- Spelling bee
- Vocal duet
- Vocal solo

== CESAFI Basketball Championship ==
CESAFI Basketball Championship
- Sport: Basketball
- Founded: 2001
- No. of teams: 19 teams (as of 2025): 8 - College division; 11 - High school division
- Most recent champions: College UV Green Lancers; High school SHS-AdC Magis Eagles
- Most titles: College UV Green Lancers (17); High school SHS-AdC Magis Eagles (9)

CESAFI's basketball tournament is arguably its most popular event, and is considered one of the country's top collegiate basketball tournaments, along with the UAAP and NCAA's basketball tournaments. Below is the list of champions of the CESAFI Basketball Tournament.

=== Champions ===
Academic Year	College	High school
2001–02	University of the Visayas	University of the Visayas
2002–03	University of the Visayas	University of San Jose – Recoletos
2003–04	University of the Visayas	University of the Visayas
2004–05	University of the Visayas	University of the Visayas
2005–06	University of the Visayas	University of the Visayas
2006–07	University of the Visayas	University of Cebu
2007–08	University of the Visayas	University of the Visayas
2008–09	University of the Visayas	University of Cebu
2009–10	University of the Visayas	Cebu Institute of Technology
2010–11	University of Cebu	Cebu Eastern College
2011–12	University of Cebu	University of the Visayas
2012–13	Southwestern University	Sacred Heart School – Ateneo de Cebu
2013–14	University of the Visayas	No champion awarded
2014–15	Southwestern University	Sacred Heart School – Ateneo de Cebu
2015–16	University of San Carlos	Sacred Heart School – Ateneo de Cebu
2016–17	University of the Visayas	Sacred Heart School – Ateneo de Cebu
2017–18	University of the Visayas	University of the Visayas
2018–19	University of the Visayas	University of Cebu
2019–20	Southwestern University	Sacred Heart School – Ateneo de Cebu
2020–21	Tournament canceled due to the COVID-19 pandemic	
2022–23	University of the Visayas	Sacred Heart School – Ateneo de Cebu
2023–24	University of the Visayas	Sacred Heart School – Ateneo de Cebu
2024–25	University of the Visayas	Sacred Heart School – Ateneo de Cebu
2025–26	University of the Visayas	Sacred Heart School – Ateneo de Cebu

=== Most Valuable Players ===
==== Season ====
Season	College		High school	
Season	College MVP	School	High school MVP	School
2001	Jerry Cavan	Cebu Institute of Technology	Reed Juntilla	University of the Visayas
2002	Neil Rañeses	University of the Visayas	Ranulfo John Malinao	University of San Jose – Recoletos
2003	JR Quiñahan	University of the Visayas	Harold Cincoflores	University of the Visayas
2004	JR Quiñahan	University of the Visayas	Eulogio Lasala, Jr.	University of the Visayas
2005	Mark Ababon	University of the Visayas	Phil Mercader	University of the Visayas
2006	Enrico John Llanto	University of San Carlos	Reynan Capoy †	University of Cebu
2007	Enrico John Llanto	University of San Carlos	Junard Premacio	University of the Visayas
2008	Greg Slaughter	University of the Visayas	Marty John Pearce	University of Cebu
2009 (Note: Fajardo and Slaughter shared the MVP award in 2009.)	Greg Slaughter	University of the Visayas	Mark Jayven Tallo	Cebu Institute of Technology
2009	June Mar Fajardo	University of Cebu	Mark Jayven Tallo	Cebu Institute of Technology
2010	June Mar Fajardo	University of Cebu	Nikee Montalvo	Cebu Eastern College
2011	June Mar Fajardo	University of Cebu	Paul Desiderio	University of the Visayas
2012	Wowie Escosio	University of the Visayas	Dawn Hynric Ochea	Sacred Heart School – Ateneo de Cebu
2013	Mark Jayven Tallo	Southwestern University	Justine Dacalos	University of Cebu
2014	Mark Jayven Tallo	Southwestern University	Felixberto Jaboneta IV	Sacred Heart School – Ateneo de Cebu
2015	Shooster Olago	University of San Carlos	Jed Cedrick Colonia	Sacred Heart School – Ateneo de Cebu
2016	Rey Anthony Suerte	University of the Visayas	Jed Cedrick Colonia	Sacred Heart School – Ateneo de Cebu
2017	Jaybie Mantilla	University of San Jose-Recoletos	Beirn Anthony Laurente	University of the Visayas
2018	Rey Anthony Suerte	University of the Visayas	Jerick Jan Ranido	University of Cebu
2019	Shaquille Imperial	Southwestern University	LA Casinillo	Sacred Heart School – Ateneo de Cebu
2020	None (Note: Tournament canceled due to the COVID-19 pandemic)			
2021	None			
2022	Jiesel Tarrosa	University of the Visayas	Jared Bahay	Sacred Heart School – Ateneo de Cebu
2023	Kent Ivo Salarda	University of the Visayas	Jared Bahay	Sacred Heart School – Ateneo de Cebu
2024	Raul Carlito Gentallan	University of the Visayas	Rodolfo Froilan Maglasang	Sacred Heart School – Ateneo de Cebu
2025	Kent Ivo Salarda	University of the Visayas	Lian Kent Basa	Sacred Heart School – Ateneo de Cebu

=== Number of championships by school ===
University/School	College	High school	Total	Last championship
University of the Visayas	17	7	24	2025–26 College
University of Cebu	2	5	7	2018–19 High school
Sacred Heart School – Ateneo de Cebu	0	9	9	2025–26 High school
Southwestern University PHINMA	3	0	3	2019–20 College
University of San Carlos	1	0	1	2015–16 College
Cebu Eastern College	0	1	1	2010–11 High school
Cebu Institute of Technology – University	0	1	1	2009–10 High school
University of San Jose – Recoletos	0	1	1	2002–03 High school

== Media coverage ==
Since its inception in 2001, replacing the old Cebu Amateur Athletic Association, CESAFI has received extensive coverage from the Cebu media and local and national newspapers like Sun.Star and The Philippine Star, but still lags behind in terms of its Manila-based counterparts UAAP and the NCAA in terms of publicity. Also, unlike the UAAP and NCAA, CESAFI had no national television partners. However, this changed as on its 15th season, the CESAFI went into nationwide TV coverage after signing an agreement with IBC 13 and Viva Sports. This agreement allowed the basketball, football and volleyball games to be televised on the channel. For its 16th season, CESAFI and Viva Sports partnered with AksyonTV to broadcast the basketball games, which is aired every Monday to Friday from 6 to 8 p.m. For its 19th season, the CESAFI is working with different student volunteers from the various member schools for the production coverage of the basketball games. The endeavour is called "CESAFI Live" and was hatched by long-time commissioner, Felix Tiukinhoy, Jr., who expressed his desire to create an environment where students are not just mere spectators. “We take CESAFI one step further this Season 19, not only by improving the environment for our student-athletes and other event contenders, but also by including more students not merely as spectators and fans, but as actual organizers and managers of various committees that make CESAFI a success,” said Tiukinhoy. All season long, the students would handling different elements of the production coverage such as camera handling, courtside reporting and annotating.

== See also ==
- University Athletic Association of the Philippines
- National Collegiate Athletic Association (Philippines)
- United Central Luzon Athletic Association
- Philippine Collegiate Champions League
