= 1982 PBA All-Star Series =

North All-Stars	South All-Stars
- Date: October 23-24, 1982
- Venue: Cebu Coliseum; Rizal Memorial Coliseum, Cebu City; Manila
- MVP: Arnie Tuadles (Toyota Super Corollas)
- Network: Vintage Sports (City2)

The 1982 PBA All-Star Series is the first official North vs South All-Star Game series by the Philippine Basketball Association and was presented by Mello Yello.

The PBA North All-Stars defeated the South team with a more total points in the two-game series, 242-240. The South All-Stars won the first game in Cebu Coliseum, 122-119, on Saturday, October 23. The North team won the second game on the following day in Manila, 123-118. Arnie Tuadles was picked by co-players in the series as Most Valuable Player (MVP). The Toyota forward had a total of 70 points in two games, including a career-high 50 points made in Cebu.

== Roster ==
=== North All-Stars ===
Mello Yello roster
Players
Coaches

Pos.	No.	Nat.	Name	Ht.	Wt.
F/C	1	(Philippines)	Manny Victorino	6 ft 5 in (1.96 m)	200 lb (91 kg)
G	4	(Philippines)	Frankie Lim	5 ft 11 in (1.80 m)	154 lb (70 kg)
G	6	(Philippines)	Atoy Co	6 ft 1 in (1.85 m)	168 lb (76 kg)
G	7	(Philippines)	Robert Jaworski (injured)	6 ft 0 in (1.83 m)	180 lb (82 kg)
F	12	(Philippines)	Rey Lazaro	6 ft 1 in (1.85 m)	179 lb (81 kg)
G	14	(Philippines)	Lim Eng Beng	5 ft 11 in (1.80 m)	175 lb (79 kg)
G	17	(Philippines)	Marte Saldana	5 ft 11 in (1.80 m)	145 lb (66 kg)
F/C	18	(Philippines)	Philip Cezar	6 ft 3 in (1.91 m)	170 lb (77 kg)
F/C	24	(Philippines)	Jose Yango	6 ft 3 in (1.91 m)	165 lb (75 kg)
G/F	33	(Philippines)	Bogs Adornado	6 ft 1 in (1.85 m)	175 lb (79 kg)
F/C	66	(Philippines)	Abe King	6 ft 3 in (1.91 m)	187 lb (85 kg)

Head coach

- Robert Jaworski

Legend

- (C) Team captain
- Injured

=== South All-Stars ===
Mello Yello roster
Players
Coaches

Pos.	No.	Nat.	Name	Ht.	Wt.
F/C	5	(Philippines)	Abet Guidaben	6 ft 5 in (1.96 m)	180 lb (82 kg)
G/F	6	(Philippines)	Biboy Ravanes	6 ft 1 in (1.85 m)	165 lb (75 kg)
G	8	(Philippines)	Francis Arnaiz	5 ft 10 in (1.78 m)	160 lb (73 kg)
F	9	(Philippines)	Marlowe Jacutin	6 ft 0 in (1.83 m)	160 lb (73 kg)
F/C	10	(Philippines)	Ramon Fernandez	6 ft 4 in (1.93 m)	162 lb (73 kg)
G/F	11	(Philippines)	Arnie Tuadles	6 ft 2 in (1.88 m)	170 lb (77 kg)
F	13	(Philippines)	Manny Paner	6 ft 2 in (1.88 m)	195 lb (88 kg)
G	14	(Philippines)	Yoyong Martirez	5 ft 8 in (1.73 m)	160 lb (73 kg)
G	15	(Philippines)	Bernie Fabiosa	5 ft 9 in (1.75 m)	160 lb (73 kg)
G/F	16	(Philippines)	Pongkee Alolor	6 ft 1 in (1.85 m)	160 lb (73 kg)
G	24	(Philippines)	Willie Generalao	5 ft 8 in (1.73 m)	150 lb (68 kg)

Head coach

- Yoyong Martirez

Legend

- (C) Team captain
- Injured

== Results ==
Vintage

October 23

North All-Stars 119, South All-Stars 122
Scoring by quarter: 32-41, 30-17, 30-28, 27-36

Cebu Coliseum, Cebu City

Vintage

October 24

North All-Stars 123, South All-Stars 118
Scoring by quarter: 31-33, 27-35, 34-26, 31-24

Rizal Memorial Coliseum, Manila
