= Primitivo Lázaro =

Spanish pianist and composer

Primitivo Lázaro Martínez (1909 – 10 May 1997) was a Spanish pianist and composer.

Lázaro was born in Fuentemolinos, Burgos, in 1909. Blind from three years, he entered Santa Catalina school in Madrid and, after a few years, was to the admitted Royal Conservatory of Madrid under the guidance of Zacarias Lopez Debesa.

He gave concerts in the main Spanish cities. Lázaro was also an arranger, composer, lecturer and conductor. From 1936 to 1938, he resided in the city of Salamanca, where he formed his orchestra. In 1939, Lázaro was named Provincial Delegate of the ONCE in Huelva, where he spent the rest of his life. He died in Huelva on 10 May 1997.

== See also ==
- Spanish music
