= Cebu Doctors' University =

Private university in Mandaue, Philippines

- Cebu Doctors' University in Mandaue
- Former name: Cebu Doctors' College (1973–2005)
- Motto: Primum Homo Esto (Latin)
- Motto in English: Let Him First Be a Man
- Type: Private Nonsectarian Non-stock Non -profit Coeducational Higher education institution
- Established: 1973; 53 years ago
- Academic affiliations: PAASCU
- President: Philip Anthony SD Larrazabal
- Vice-president: Enrico B. Gruet, MD (VP for Academic Affairs); Engr. Oscar A. Tuason (VP for Administration); Bettina Anne Larrazabal-Veloso (VP for Finance)
- Students: ≤ 10,000
- Location: Dr. P.V. Larrazabal Jr. Ave., North Reclamation Area, Mandaue City, Cebu, Philippines; 10°19′12″N 123°55′59″E
- Campus: Main campus (urban)
- Language: English – medium of instruction
- University Hymn: CDU Our Alma Mater
- Colors: Blue and White
- Sporting affiliations: CESAFI; PRISAA
- Mascot: White Stallions
- Website: www.cebudoctorsuniversity.edu
- Location in the Visayas Location in the Philippines

Cebu Doctors' University, also referred to by its acronym CDU and colloquially Cebu Doc, is a private nonsectarian coeducational higher education institution located in Mandaue City, Cebu, Philippines. It was founded in 1973 at Cebu City as Cebu Doctors' College (CDC), the school was formally renamed in 2005 as Cebu Doctors' University (CDU). It is organized into eight colleges, a Graduate school, and as of 2016, a Senior High school (Grades 11 and 12).

It is the only private institution in the Philippines granted a University Status without having a basic education curriculum and catering mainly to courses related to the health services field. It is the first non-sectarian university in the Visayas to be granted the Autonomous Status, the highest status a university can get from the Commission on Higher Education (CHED).

== Brief history ==
Cebu Doctors' University was organized in 1973 as Cebu Doctors' College and was registered with the Securities and Exchange Commission in 1976. Its first campus was located adjacent to the present Cebu Doctors' University Hospital. Cebu Doctors' College of Nursing (CDU-CN) was the first College of the university when it was opened in 1973. Subsequently, the following colleges opened: in 1975, the Cebu Doctors' College of Arts and Sciences (CDU-CAS); in 1977, the Cebu Doctors' College of Medicine (CDU-CM), a non-stock, non-profit medical foundation; in 1980, the Cebu Doctors' College of Dentistry (CDU-CD), the Cebu Doctors' College of Optometry (CDU-CO), and the Graduate School; and in 1982, the Cebu Doctors' Institute of Allied Medical Sciences (CDIAMS) which was later renamed Cebu Doctors' College of Allied Medical Sciences (CDU-CAMS). In 1992, it was reconstructed creating therefrom a separate college, the Cebu Doctors' College of Rehabilitative Sciences (CDU-CRS). In 2004, the Cebu Doctors' University College of Pharmacy (CDU-CP) was established. And in 2016, the Cebu Doctors' University Senior High School (CDU-SHS) was set up under the CDU-CAS.

== Colleges ==
- College of Nursing
- College of Arts and Sciences
- College of Medicine
- College of Dentistry
- College of Optometry
- College of Allied Medical Sciences
- College of Rehabilitative Sciences
- College of Pharmacy

== Admissions ==
Students are admitted on the basis of their individual qualifications, regardless of sex, religion or race. CDU, especially the college offering a certain course offering, requires evidence of general competence, motivation, and capability. Aside from grades and test scores, preference shall be given to those who are properly motivated evincing an interest to learn, and have consistently demonstrated a genuine concern to follow CDU's standards.

== Campus facilities ==
- Library – The Cebu Doctors' University has two libraries, namely: the Main Library, which is located on the second floor and the University Medical Library, which is found on the fifth floor of Cebu Doctors' University. The University Library caters to the needs of all students of Cebu Doctors' University, except those of the College of Medicine, the latter having its own library.
- CDU Swimming Pool
- University Examination Hall – Old Gymnasium now being utilized as an Examination Hall
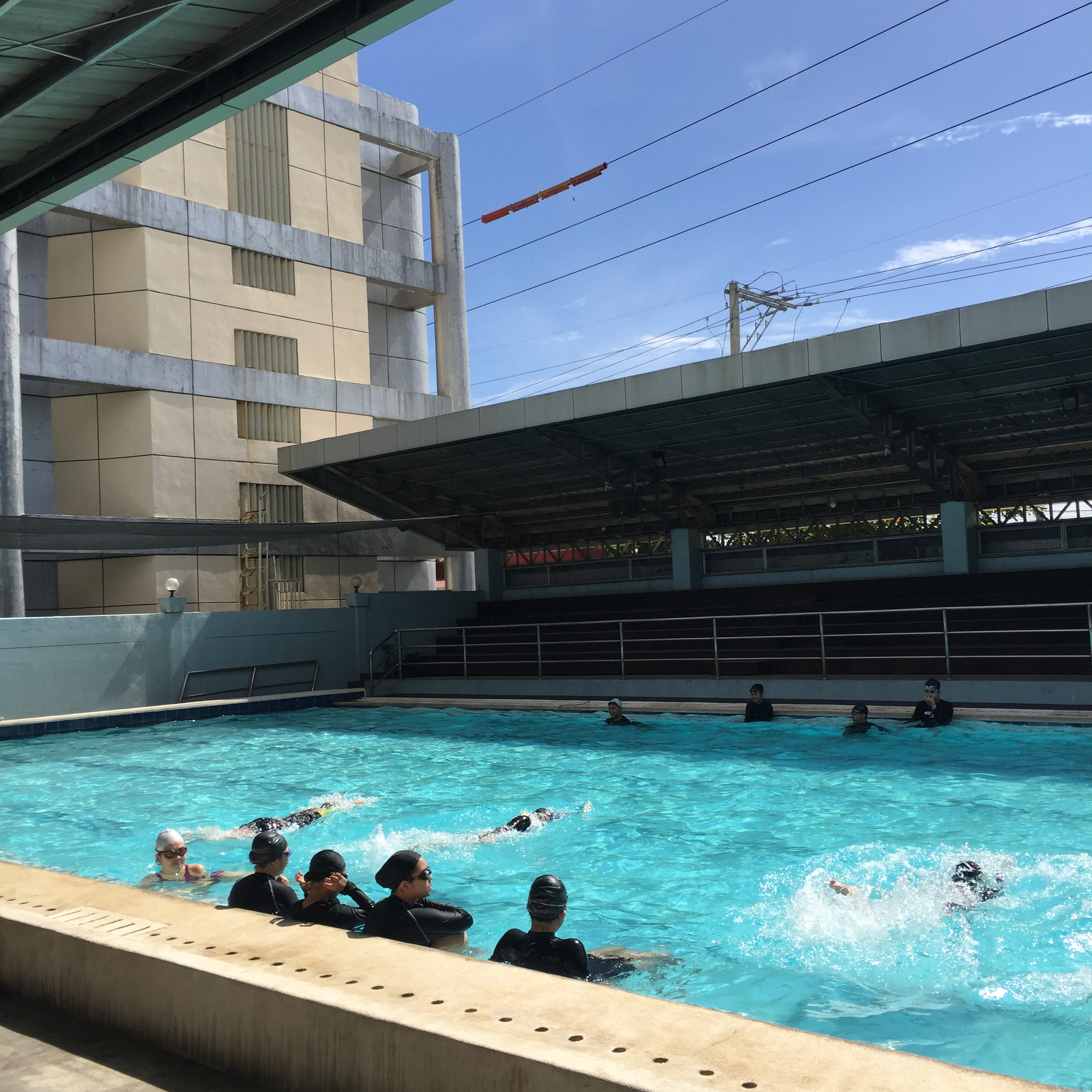
CDU Swimming Pool

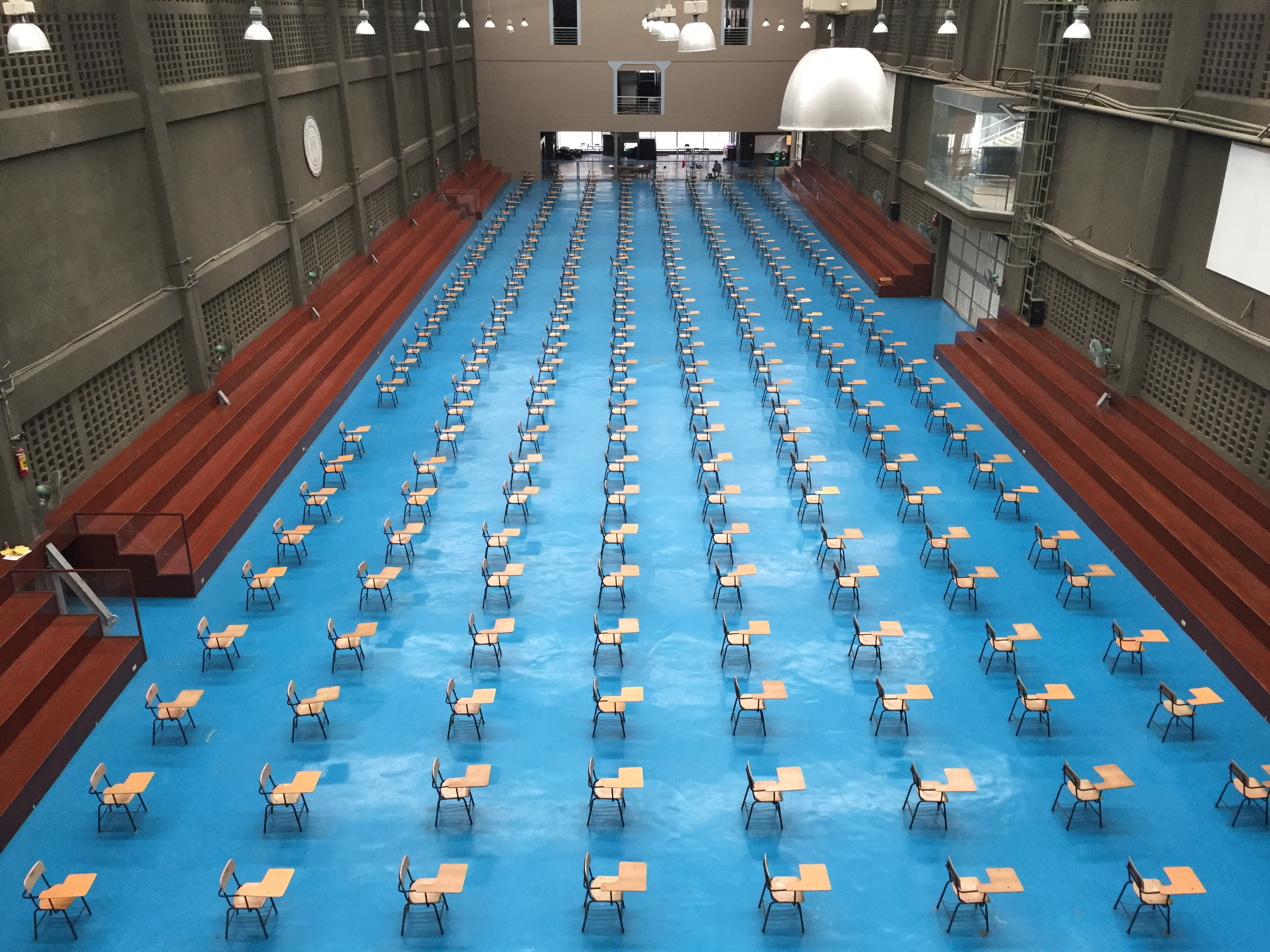
CDU Examination Hall
