= Primitivo Viray =

Filipino academic (born 1960)

Primitivo E. Viray Jr., S.J. (born October 31, 1960), also known as Fr. Jun Viray, was the 12th Provincial Superior of the Society of Jesus in the Philippines, serving from 2017 to 2023.

Born in Quezon City, he was educated at Sacred Heart School – Ateneo de Cebu. He holds a degree in business economics from the University of the Philippines, as well as an MA in rural development studies and doctorate in development studies, both from the University of East Anglia.

He was ordained to the priesthood in 1995 and became Parish Priest in Ipil, Zamboanga Sibugay.

From 2006 to 2009, he was the Local Superior in Zamboanga while working as Professor of Economics at Ateneo de Zamboanga University. He later became Rector of Loyola House of Studies.

In 2011, he was elected President of Ateneo de Naga University and Superior of the Jesuits in Naga. He also became Chair of the Jesuit Higher Education Commission.

He became President of the Jesuit Conference of Asia Pacific (JCAP) in January 2024, and simultaneously the Major Superior of the Jesuits in Pakistan, the newest mission territory of JCAP. In the decree dated 13 June 2023 appointing Viray, Fr. Arturo Sosa SJ, Superior General of the Jesuits, noted Viray's “integrity and prudence”.
