= College of Technological Sciences–Cebu =

Private college in Cebu City, Philippines

College of Technological Sciences – Cebu
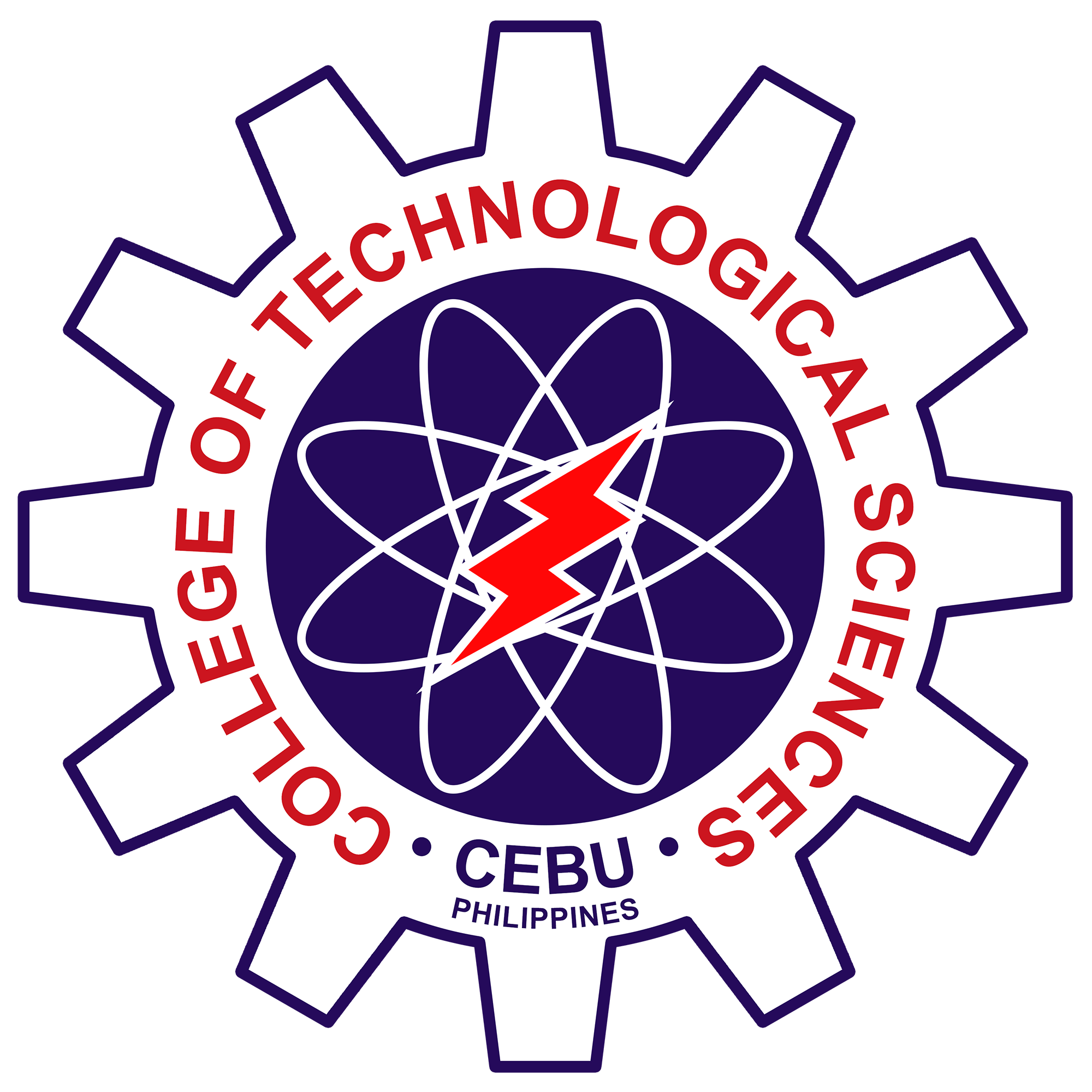
- Former name: Cebu Technical School
- Motto: "The School that prepares your future career" "Leading the way in quality technical education"
- Type: Non-sectarian, Co-Ed, Private
- Established: 1950
- Chairman: Atty. Agusto W. Go
- President: Candice Gotianuy
- Faculty: 50
- Students: 502
- Location: N. Bacalso Ave., Cor. R.R. Rallos St., Sambag 1, Cebu City, Cebu, Philippines; 10°17′52″N 123°53′26″E
- Campus: Cebu City
- Colors: Gray and Blue
- Website: www.cts.edu.ph
- Location in the Visayas Location in the Philippines

College of Technological Sciences – Cebu (CTS-C or better known simply as CTS) is a mid-sized educational institution currently located at Corner R.R. Rallos Street and N. Bacalso Avenue, Cebu City, Philippines. It is the sister school of University of Cebu.

== History ==
The year 1950 marked the founding of the College of Technological Sciences, Inc. (formerly Cebu Technical School).The founder and the first president was Engineer Jovencio Bigornia, It was originally housed at Doña Amparo Building at Corner Sanciangko & Junquera Sts., Cebu City.

Initially CTS offered the following courses:

- 1 Year - Commercial Radiotelephone Operator
- 2 Years - Commercial Radiotelegraph Operator
- 2 Years - Radio Technician
- 1 Year - Radio Mechanic
- 1 Year - Auto Mechanic (Including Diesel Mechanic)

On March 18, 1958, the School was officially organized as a stock corporation pursuant to SEC Registration No. 16461. The founders committed themselves “to organize, establish, maintain, and conduct a progressive institution of learning of high academic standing which will emphasize vocational and technical knowledge.”

In 1969, CTS offered the following additional courses:

- 1 Year - Refrigeration & Air-condition Mechanic
- 1 Year - Applied/Practical Electricity

Curricula of courses offered were reviewed and redirected to make them relevant and responsive to the needs of industry. In 1973, courses offered were recognized by the Bureau of Private Schools.

In 1976, pursuant to Department Order No. 23, the two-year General Radio Communication Operator course was offered to meet the international standard for overseas employment, to which the Philippines was committed under the Geneva Convention.

In 1977, the Ministry of Education, Culture and Sports approved CTS application to offer a five-year course leading to the degree of Bachelor of Science in Electronics and Communications Engineering (BSECE).

In 1978, in answer to domestic and international shipping needs, CTS obtained approval to operate the following additional courses:

- 2 Years - Marine Electronic Technician
- 2 Years - Marine Electrical Technician
- 2 Years - Marine Refrigeration Technician

In June 2004 the school decided to open a new course which is Bachelor of Science In Nursing they utilize the fourth floor building as the office, faculty, classrooms and Simulation room.

The College of Nursing open up with 38 full-time students under Dr. Lucita B. Galarpe as the first Dean of the college of Nursing together with her was Mrs. Cecilia P. Mañalac as Associate dean of the college and Mrs. Nerenita Y. Lim as Level I adviser.

Last June 2 and 3 2008 the first batch of the college of nursing had their first attempt in the Nursing Licensure Examination and Successfully the School got 80% passing rate from National 40% Passing Percentage.

The school also offers Senior High School.

CTS has linkages with the leaders in education technology. Likewise, CTS has developed linkages with industry to conform its courses to the demands of industry.

== Academic programs ==
=== Commission on Higher Education (CHED) Accredited Programs ===
- BSAT (Bachelor of Science in Automotive Technology)
- BSIT (Bachelor of Science in Information Technology)
- BSIT (Bachelor of Science in Industrial Technology)

Major In:

- Electrical Technology
- Electronics Technology
- Refrigeration and Air Conditioning Technology

=== TESDA Accredited Programs ===
- Automotive Servicing NC1
- Automotive Servicing (Chassis Repair) NCII
- Driving NCII
- Electrical Installation and Maintenance NCII
- Electronic Products Assembly and Servicing NCII
- Motorcycle/Small Engine Servicing NCII

=== Senior High School Department ===
- Academic Track
  - Accountancy, Business and Management (ABM)
  - Humanities and Social Sciences (HUMSS)
  - Science, Technology, Engineering and Mathematics (STEM)
- Technical Vocational and Livelihood (TVL) Track
  - Automotice Servicing – NC II
  - Consumer Electronics Servicing – NC II
  - Electrical Installation and Maintenance – NC II
  - Shielded Metal Arc Welding – NC II
  - Computer Systems Servicing – NC II
  - Computer Programming – NC II

- Atty. Augusto W. Go - Chairman
- Atty. Aaron Lee S. Yap - CTS-C President
- Ms. Consolacion B. Repollo - Vice President

== CTS-C Faculty ==
- Dr. Cendryl Molina; Dean
- Mr. Elmer Sevilleno; BSAT Chairman
- Mr. Neilgar Carnable; BSIT Coordinator
- Engr. Peter John Rosario; College Coordinator
- Engr. Allan Bersabal
- Mr. Anthony Duterte
- Mrs. Maria Elsa Tejam
- Mrs. Eloisa Cañete
- Dr. Eilyn Palahang, SHS Principal
- Beatrice Caballero
- Marivie Sebache

== CTS-C Partner Industries ==
- Toyota Motors Philippines
- Menzi Incorporated
- BYD Cebu
- CHANGAN Cebu
- Global Star Motors Corporation
- SHELL Foundation

== See also ==
- University of Cebu
