= Cebu Eastern College =

Private Chinese college in Cebu City, Philippines

- Pamantasang Silangang Cebu (Filipino)
- Former name: Cebu Chinese School (1915–1961)
- Established: 1915
- President: Frederick K.D. Ong
- Location: Kilat St., Pahina Central, Cebu City, Cebu, Philippines; 10°17′40″N 123°53′45″E
- Newspapaer: Atalaya Publication
- Nickname: Dragons
- Sporting affiliations: CESAFI
- Location in the Visayas Location in the Philippines

Cebu Eastern College (simplified Chinese: 宿务东方学院; traditional Chinese: 宿務東方學院; pinyin: Sùwù Dōngfāng Xuéyuàn; Pe̍h-ōe-jī: Sok-bū Tong-hong Ha̍k-īⁿ) is a Chinese Filipino school situated at the intersection of Dimasalang and Leon Kilat in Cebu City, Philippines. The campus offers kindergarten, elementary, high school and college classes. Additionally, they operate a separate campus on D. Jakosalem that focuses on elementary-level education. CEC offers Chinese classes as well as English and Filipino subjects.

== Sports ==
The school participates in the Cebu Schools Athletic Foundation, Inc. (CESAFI). They have been led by multiple CESAFI stars such as Nikee Montalvo, among many others. They won the Happee Online Sinulog Basketball Cup, defeating Hapee Online with a final score of 195–192, led by their leading wingman Montalvo with 30 points in double overtime.

In the CESAFI 2010 season, CEC won the championship crown, as the Dragons defeated the SHS-Ateneo De Cebu Magis Eagles, 3–0, in a best-of-five series.

Other notable stars include basketball cagers BJ Zosa, Mark Olayon, and Roy Villarias, who were among the selected players recruited by the UE Red Warriors to play in the UAAP. James Tempra and Raymar Jose were recruited to play for the FEU Tamaraws.

Preceded by San Pablo Chung Hua School; June 1915	Oldest Chinese School in the Philippines; Fifth; September 1915	Succeeded by Saint Stephen's High School; July 22, 1917
