= The Sisters of Mary School =

Roman Catholic school in the Philippines

Location
- Silang, Cavite and Cebu; Philippines; 14°15′37″N 120°58′35″E

Information
- Type: Private school
- Motto: The glory of God is man fully alive. - St. Irenaeus; Let us serve the Lord with joy. - Psalms 100:2
- Established: 1985
- Founder: Aloysius Schwartz
- Campus: Urban, 4 campuses
- Colors: Yellow, Blue, Red and Green
- Nickname: SMS, Aloysian
- Affiliation: Catholic
- Website: www.thesistersofmaryschools.org

The Sisters of Mary School (SMS) sometimes abbreviated as (SOM) is a Private Catholic school in the Philippines, located in Silang, Cavite and Metro Cebu. It consists of four campuses called Boystown and Girlstown located in different areas of Silang, Cavite and Metro Cebu The founder of SMS was the American diocesan priest Aloysius Schwartz.

== History ==
The Sisters of Mary School was founded on August 15, 1985 in Sta. Mesa Manila Philippines and later on it expanded in different areas of Cavite .

In 1990, The Sisters of Mary School established its first campus in Talisay City, which is also composed of both campuses for Boystown and Girlstown before they were separated. The Boystown campus was transferred to Minglanilla, Cebu.

== Academics ==
The academic and curricular programs below are offered by the different school campuses of The Sisters of Mary School Philippines:

TVET courses offered in Girlstown:

- Bookkeeping NC III
- Computer Systems Servicing NC II
- Electronic Products Assembly and Servicing NC II
- Contact Center Services NC II
- Bread and Pastry Production NC II
- Dressmaking NC II
- Mechatronics Servicing NC II
- Technical Drafting NC II
- Programming.Net NC III

TVET courses offered in Boystown:

- Automotive Servicing NC I and II
- Bread and Pastry Production NC II
- Electrical Installation and Maintenance NC II and III
- Computer Systems Servicing NC II
- Driving NC II
- Contact Center Services NC II
- Machining NC I and II
- CNC Lathe and Milling Machine Operation NC II
- Shielded Metal Arc Welding (SMAW) NC I and II
- Technical Drafting NC II
- Tailoring NC II

== Campuses ==
=== Biga Campus ===
Location: Bo. Biga, Silang Cavite
Maximum Capacity: 3,500 high school girls

=== Adlas Campus ===
Location: Bo. Adlas, Silang Cavite
Maximum Capacity: 2,200 high school boys

=== Talisay Campus ===
Location: J.P. Rizal St., Talisay City Cebu
Maximum Capacity: 3,300 high school girls

=== Minglanilla Campus ===
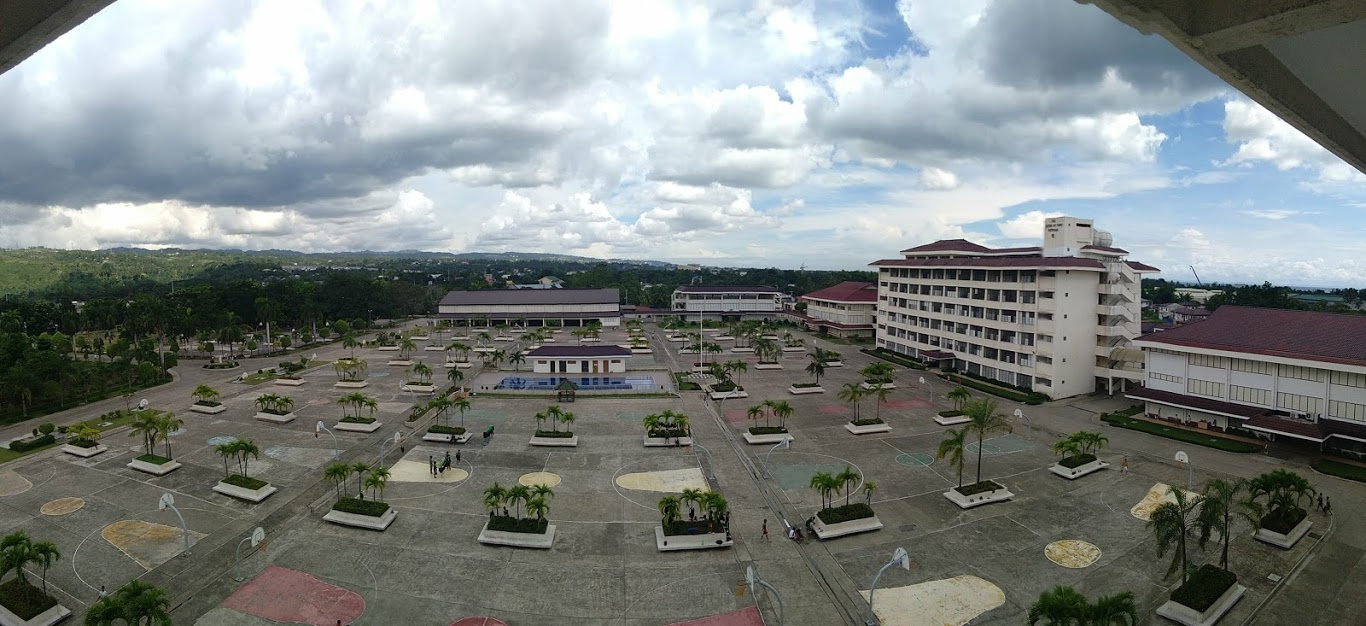
Minglanilla Campus

Location: Tungkop, Minglanilla, Cebu
Maximum Capacity: 2,200 high school boys
