= Cebu Coliseum =

Indoor arena in Cebu City, Philippines

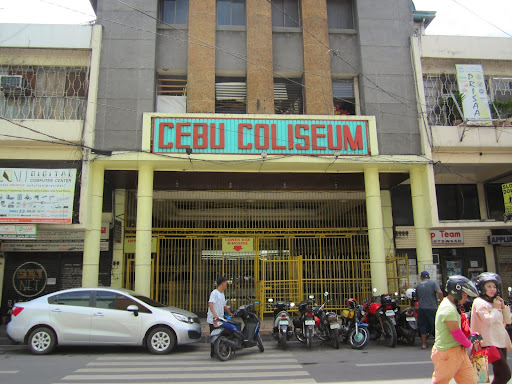
- Cebu Coliseum in 2022, prior to the 2025 renovation
- Interactive map of Cebu Coliseum
- Location: Sanciangco St., Cebu City, Philippines
- Coordinates: 10°17′48″N 123°53′44″E
- Owner: University of Cebu
- Operator: University of Cebu
- Capacity: 5,000

Construction
- Renovated: 2025

Tenants
- CESAFI (2001–present); University of Cebu; Cebu Gems (MBA) (1998–2002); Philippine Basketball Association (out-of-town games); Cebu Greats (MPBL) (2026–present)

The Cebu Coliseum is an indoor arena located in Cebu City, Philippines. The arena is operated by the University of Cebu and has a capacity of around 5,000. It the primary venue for the Cebu Schools Athletic Foundation, Inc. (CESAFI) and has also hosted games for the Philippine Basketball Association as well as the Cebu Gems of the defunct Metropolitan Basketball Association (MBA).

== History ==
On August 4, 1962, one of the first events it hosted was a fight between hometown hero Gabriel "Flash" Elorde and Japanese boxer Terou Kosaka. It was their second of their four fights in a span of 4 years (1961-1965). On March 24, 1979, the arena hosted the first National Arnis Championships. It has also become a regular venue for selected out-of-town games in the Philippine Basketball Association, with the arena also hosting the 1982 PBA All-Star Series, 1998 PBA All-Star Weekend, and 2004 PBA All-Star Weekend.

=== Renovation ===
In 2025, the Cebu Coliseum will begin to undergo a renovation to modernize the venue ahead of CESAFI's 25th anniversary. The renovation was originally scheduled for August 2024, after the 2024 Palarong Pambansa, but was moved to January 2025 to make way for the following CESAFI season. The renovation is set to cost ₱100 million.

On November 15, 2025, the East Asia Super League (EASL) played the league's first charity match between the Philippines' Meralco Bolts and Macau Black Bears, with proceeds going to relief efforts across Cebu province due to the 2025 Cebu earthquake and Typhoon Tino.

== Events ==
=== EASL games ===
Date	Home team	Result	Away team	Phase	Ref.
November 15, 2025	(Philippines) Meralco Bolts	92–74	Macau Black Bears	2025–26 group stage	

== See also ==
- University of Cebu
- Cebu City Sports Complex
- SM Seaside Cebu Arena
- List of Philippine Basketball Association arenas

Preceded by Cuneta Astrodome; Araneta Coliseum	Host of the PBA All-Star Game; 1998; 2004	Succeeded by PhilSports Arena; Ilocos Norte Centennial Arena
