= Lapu-Lapu City College =

Public college in Lapu-Lapu, Philippines

- Kolehiyo sa Dakbayan sa Lapu-Lapu (Cebuano); Colegio de la Ciudad de Lapu-Lapu (Spanish)
- Motto: Love, Leadership, Courage and Competence
- Type: Government, Co-educational
- Established: 2010
- Affiliations: Lapu-Lapu City Government, Commission on Higher Education, Technical Education and Skills Development Authority
- Location: Lapu-Lapu City, Cebu, Philippines; 10°17′35″N 123°57′01″E
- Campus: STEC Campus, Gun-ob Campus
- Nickname: LLCCian
- Location in the Visayas Location in the Philippines

Lapu-Lapu City College (LLCC) is an educational institution in Lapu-Lapu City, Cebu, Philippines. It is located at Barangay Basak and Barangay Gun-ob.

It was established through the City Ordinance No. 354-2010, designed to serve indigent students of the city by providing them access to quality and affordable education.

== History ==
The buildings occupied by Lapu-Lapu City College was formerly used by the Department of Education Lapu-Lapu City Division. Since Department of Education (LLC) transfers to its new building, the college had occupied the space known as STEC campus through the initiative of the city government to give its citizens an affordable and quality tertiary education. LLCC - STEC Campus is currently occupied by the College Administration, College of Hospitality Management and College of Technology. The College of Education was relocated to the newly built Gun-ob Campus.

== Academics ==
The college offers the following courses:

CoED Department:

- Bachelor of Elementary Education
  - General Education
  - Early Childhood Education
- Bachelor of Secondary Education
  - English
  - Filipino
  - Mathematics
  - Social Studies

CoT Department:

- Bachelor of Science in Industrial Technology
  - Computer Technology
  - Electronics Technology

CoHTM Department:

- Bachelor of Science in Hospitality Management
- Bachelor of Science in Tourism Management

== Notable Achievements ==
Competition	Place	Representative(s)	Award
2011 LLCC Alay-Lakad	Lapu-Lapu City Hall	Students	Most Disciplined
2014 Mega Cebu: Academic Competition	University of San Jose Recoletos	Angel Muñez (BSIT- CT); Jason Sarabia (BSHM); Meryll Joy Villalon (BSIT-CT); Lavernia Velez (BSED-English)	3rd Place
2014 Mega Cebu: Literary Competition	University of San Jose Recoletos	Lavernia Velez (BSED-English)	3rd Place
