= University of Cebu =

Private university in Cebu City, Philippines

- Unibersidad sa Sugbo (Cebuano); Pamantasan ng Cebu (Filipino)
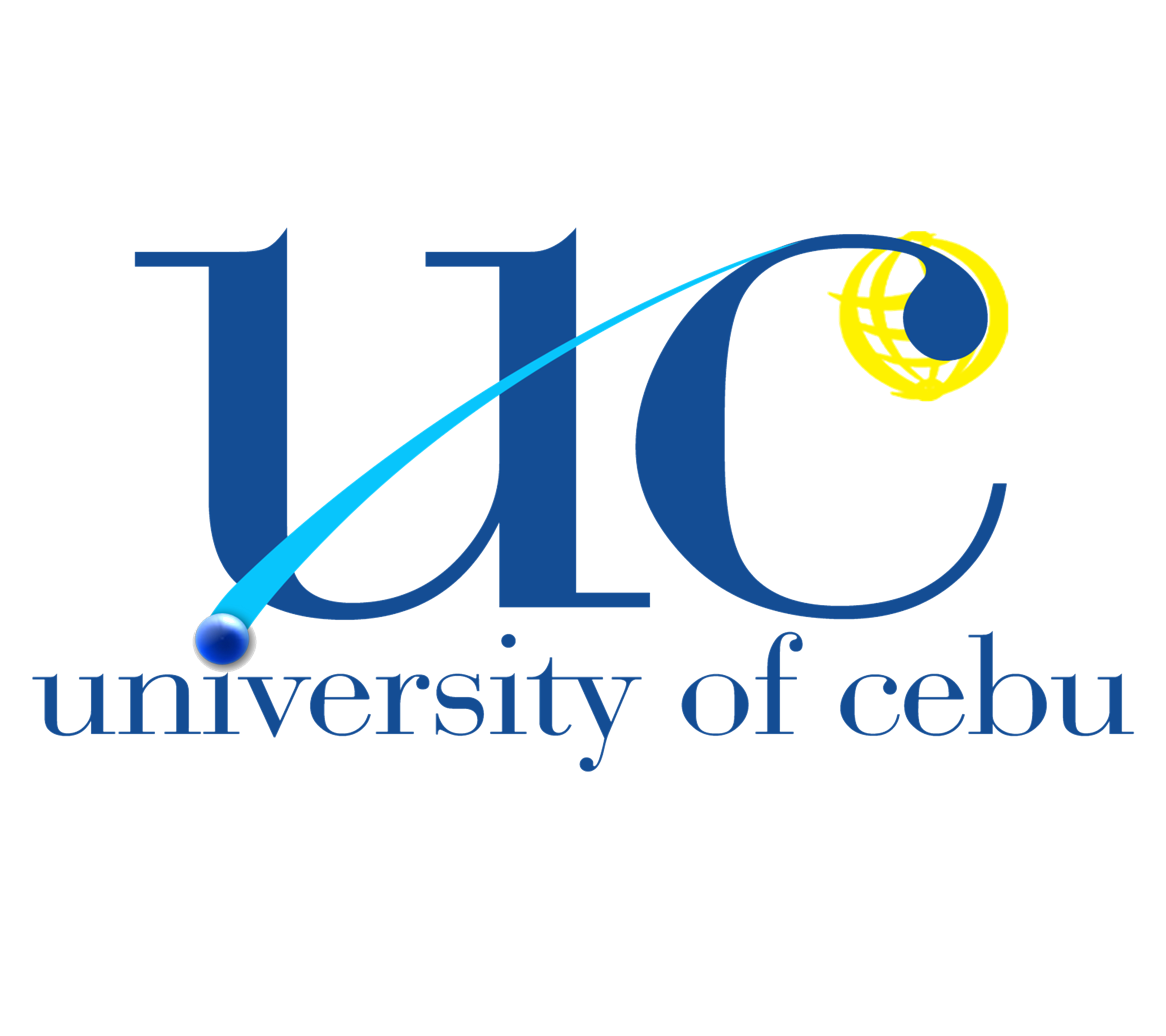
- Former names: Cebu College of Commerce (1964–1972); Cebu Central Colleges (1972–1992)
- Motto: Education towards global competitiveness
- Type: Private, Non-sectarian, Research, Coeducational
- Established: 1964; 62 years ago
- Academic affiliations: PACU-COA
- Chancellor: Candice G. Gotianuy
- President: Atty. Augusto W. Go
- Vice-Chancellor: Atty. Manuel Elijah Sarausad (Executive Vice-Chancellor); Dr. Anna Liza Son (VC-Academics Affairs Prof. Ed.); Dr. Yolanda Sayson (VC-Academics Affairs Gen. Ed.); Dean Ofelia G. Maña (VC-Business Development and Innovations)
- Students: 61,000+
- Location: Sanciangko St. Cebu City, Philippines; 10°17′49″N 123°53′49″E
- Campus: 5 urban campuses: Main Campus Sanciangko St., Brgy. Kalubihan, Cebu City J. Alcantara St., Brgy. Sambag I, Cebu City (Senior high school); Maritime Education and Training Center (METC) Campus Alumnos St., Brgy. Mambaling, Cebu City; Banilad Campus Gov. Cuenco Ave., Brgy. Banilad, Cebu City Hon. B. Tudtud Private Rd., Brgy. Banilad, Cebu City (Annex building); Lapu-Lapu–Mandaue (LM) Campus A.C. Cortes Ave., Brgy. Looc, Mandaue; Pardo–Talisay (PT) Campus (formerly the St. Paul College Foundation, Inc.) N. Bacalso Ave., Cebu South Road, Brgy. Bulacao Pardo, Cebu City; South Campus (near Pardo-Talisay Campus) Bulacao, Cebu City
- Newspaper: Main Campus Lakandiwa Sangdiwa (Senior high school department); Lapu-Lapu–Mandaue (LM) Campus Focus Publication Timon (Maritime department) Bits & Bytes (Computer studies department Ang Silakbo (Senior high school department); Banilad Campus Umalohokan; Maritime Education and Training Center (METC) Campus Anchor Publication; Pardo–Talisay (PT) Campus Bandillo Publication
- Nickname: Webmasters
- Sporting affiliations: CESAFI
- Website: www.uc.edu.ph
- Location in the Visayas Location in the Philippines

The University of Cebu (UC; Cebuano: Unibersidad sa Sugbo; Filipino: Pamantasan ng Cebu) is a private, non-sectarian, coeducational higher education institution located in Cebu City, Philippines. Founded in 1964 by Atty. Augusto W. Go as the Cebu College of Commerce, it was renamed Cebu Central Colleges in 1972 before achieving university status in 1992. UC provides K-12 basic education, undergraduate, and graduate degree programs across multiple campuses in Metro Cebu through its departments, colleges and schools.

It operates a multi-campus system across Metro Cebu, including UC Main, UC Banilad, UC Lapu‑Lapu–Mandaue (UC-LM), UC Maritime (UC-METC), UC South (Pardo–Talisay), and a medical complex-the UC Medical Center (UCMed) which houses the UC School of Medicine. At present, UC has more than 60,000 students enrolled across its campuses, making it the largest private university in the Philippines.

== History ==
=== Early Years (1964–1972) ===
The university was established in 1964 as the Cebu College of Commerce (CCC) by lawyer and businessman Atty. Augusto W. Go, together with a small group of young associates. The college officially opened its doors with an initial batch of only 239 students enrolled in the first semester, utilizing a modest physical infrastructure. Its first curricular offerings were focused heavily on business and office administration, specifically a Bachelor of Science in Commerce and an Associate in Secretarial Science. By its eighth year of continuous operations, CCC experienced an exponential surge in enrollment, climbing to 4,185 active students. In direct response to the community's demand for broader career paths, the administration aggressively expanded its catalog by adding programs in Teacher Education, Liberal Arts, Criminology, and Customs Administration.

=== Transition to Central Colleges (1972–1992) ===
In 1972, to better reflect its transforming multi-disciplinary academic landscape, the institution dropped its business-exclusive name and was renamed Cebu Central Colleges (CCC). During this period, the curriculum expanded significantly to meet the growing demand for professional education in Central Visayas. New programs were introduced in healthcare and medicine, including Nursing, Midwifery, and Health Aide training, as well as in engineering and technology, offering degrees in Mechanical, Electrical, and Civil Engineering. Additionally, foundational courses in Maritime Studies were established for Marine Officers, along with programs in Naval Architecture and Marine Engineering. In 1983, following an academic research trip by Atty. Augusto Go to the United States, the institution made history by becoming the first school in Region VII (Central Visayas) to launch a specialized degree program in Information and Computer Science.

=== Modern Era (1992–Present) ===
Following decades of rapid infrastructure growth and academic maturity, the Commission on Higher Education (CHED) granted full university status to the institution, officially renaming it the University of Cebu in 1992. Over the modern era, UC has established itself as a leading educational institution, earning recognition from CHED for its Deregulated Status and designating several of its departments as Centers of Excellence (COE). Furthermore, the Philippine Association of Colleges and Universities Commission on Accreditation (PACUCOA) has previously recognized UC for holding the distinction of having the most accredited individual programs among learning institutions in the region.

In May 2015, the University of Cebu Medical Center (UCMed) was established by University of Cebu founder Atty. Augusto W. Go and UCMed President Candice G. Gotianuy. Located on a one-hectare property along Ouano Avenue in Mandaue City, Cebu, the hospital was built with a ₱2 billion investment and opened during an inauguration attended by then-Philippine President Benigno Aquino III. Alongside the hospital, the University of Cebu School of Medicine (UCSM) began operations during the 2015–2016 academic year to integrate medical education with clinical practice. The campus expanded in December 2016 with the completion of a seven-story School of Medicine and Medical Arts Building, which added lecture halls, laboratories, and outpatient doctors' clinics. In May 2025, the institution marked its 10th anniversary under the leadership of Medical Director Dr. Armando V. Tan. Later that year, in September 2025, UCMed expanded its outpatient services by opening the Kalusugan Center, operating as a PhilHealth YAKAP program provider to offer subsidized consultations, diagnostic laboratory tests, and preventative cancer screenings to patients.

The newest campus in the university system, UC South Campus (Pardo–Talisay), was inaugurated on May 24, 2024, in Barangay Bulacao, Cebu City. Built on the former site of the St. Paul College Foundation, the campus extends the university's services to the southern edge of Talisay City. ′

== Campuses ==
The university currently has five campuses and a medical complex spread across Metro Cebu:

=== UC Main (Downtown Cebu City) ===
The downtown flagship main campus is a dense urban complex composed of vertically integrated structures including:

The Jones Building is a multi-story skyscraper situated along Osmeña Boulevard (Jones Avenue). It serves as a modern landmark in the city center, housing multi-level computer laboratories, executive offices, and advanced classroom units.

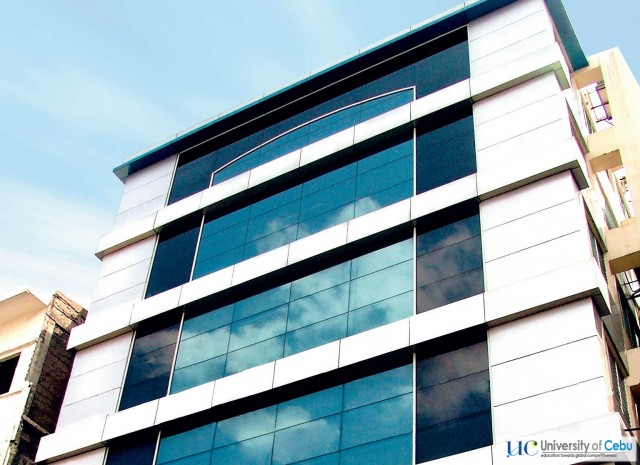
Sanciangko Buildings UC Main Campus

Along Sanciangko Street, the UC Main Buildings serve as the campus's original foundation. The complex features a central quadrangle and courts, and it hosts the main libraries, central registrar, and foundational colleges.

The J. Alcantara Building which is dedicated mostly to the specialized Senior High School (SHS) Department and supporting campus grounds.

The SMART Wireless Laboratory is a specialized technical facility integrated into the engineering wing for advanced wireless communication applications.

The Cebu Coliseum is an indoor arena owned and operated by the University of Cebu, with a seating capacity of approximately 5,000 to 8,000. It serves as the primary sports venue for the UC Webmasters and hosts regional tournaments such as CESAFI.

=== UC Banilad (North Cebu City) ===
Designed to accommodate the growing demand in Cebu's northern residential and business district, UC Banilad campus features high-density, vertical architecture buildings.

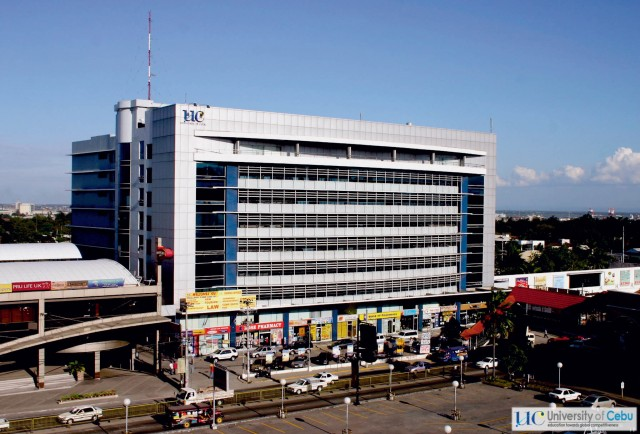
UC Banilad Main Building

The UC Banilad Main Building is a sprawling multi-story building featuring massive lecture halls, computer pools, and academic units. The upper floors house culinary kitchens and mock hospitality rooms.

The School of Law Wing is a dedicated multi-level quadrant housing the UC School of Law, complete with mock courtrooms, specialized legal archives, and study lounges.

The Senior HS Building, a standalone extension along the Hon. B. Tudtud Private Road quadrant, has 12 floors featuring 63 new classrooms, a training kitchen, and modern computer and robotics laboratories. It serves exclusively junior and senior high school students.

Clinical Simulation Wards are customized medical instruction suites constructed to replicate ICU configurations and real-world operating rooms for Nursing and Medical Technology students.

=== UC-LM (Mandaue City) ===
Located at the base of the old Mactan-Mandaue Bridge, UC-LM serves the Lapu-Lapu and Mandaue student population that opened in May 1995.

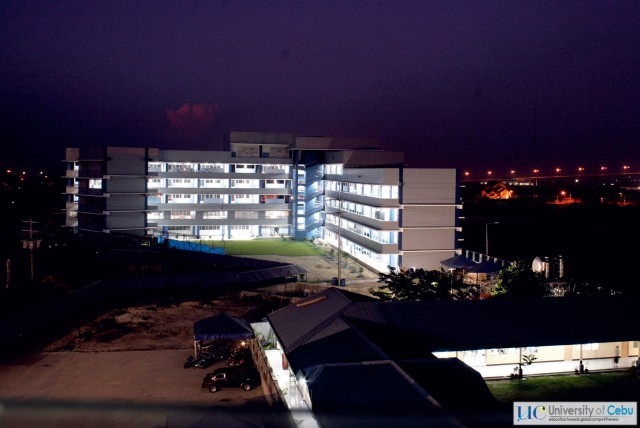
Academic Blocks at UC - Lapu-Lapu Mandaue

The UCLM Main Academic Blocks are Multistory instructional configurations connected by integrated, covered walkways to shield students from weather elements.

The UCLM Annex Complexes (Annex 1 & 2) are Corporate-grade structural expansions added to scale cross-enrolled student counts.

The Annex 2 Social Hall is a high-capacity indoor event auditorium utilized for regional symposia, degree assemblies, and cross-campus organizations.

The Basic Education (BE) Quadrangle is A central open-air structural square utilized for assembly points, sports pep rallies, and university events.

UCLM Pool is a competitive aquatic training ground used for maritime survival training and varsity sports team drills.

=== UC-METC (Mambaling, Cebu City) ===
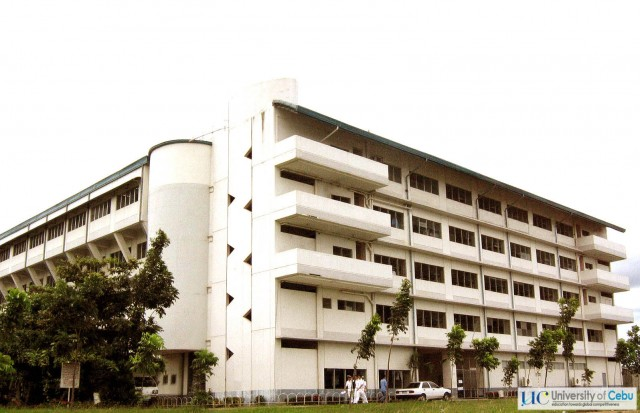
UC-METC Building Complex

Opened in 1990, the Maritime Education and Training Center serves as a specialized nautical campus for the University of Cebu.

The METC Building Complex is the primary multi-story instructional building that houses the primary naval architecture, marine engineering, and merchant marine class registries.

The Technical Simulation Suite is a specialized high-tech wing, houses the Towing Tank and Wave Basin Simulator and integrated radar control configurations, operational engine room setups, and high-fidelity navigational bridges.

The Maritime Dormitory Complex is a dedicated residential building constructed on campus specifically to house international maritime scholars and Norwegian Shipowners Association (NSA) cadets under strict supervisor control.

The UC Maritime Training Center has Survival Training Pools used for mandatory marine safety, lifeboat deployment, advanced Fire Fighting, Proficiency in Survival Craft and Rescue Boats (PSCRB), GMDSS Radio Operator, Ship Security Awareness, Radar and ARPA use and emergency helicopter ditching simulations which is accredited by MARINA.

=== UC South (Pardo-Talisay) ===
The UC South in Pardo-Talisay location is the newest addition to the university's campus system. It opened in May 2024.

The Main South Complex, originally the site of the main campus of the St. Paul College Foundation, now hosts basic education and undergraduate programs that extend the university's services to the edge of Talisay City and nearby municipalities.

=== UC Medical Center (UCMed Mandaue) ===
A medical complex opened in 2015, located on a one-hectare property along Ouano Avenue, Subangdaku, Mandaue City. It houses the University of Cebu School of Medicine, serving as the primary clinical teaching facility, and operates as a private hospital. The complex consists of two integrated structures:

The Main UCMed Hospital Building is a 12 story tertiary care facility serving as the primary training and clinical rotation site for the university's health sciences students. It includes Clinical Wards, Specialized Diagnostic Centers, and the Kalusugan Center.

The School of Medicine and Medical Arts Building, opened in December 2016, is a seven-story structure adjacent to the main hospital, providing clinical classroom space and outpatient facilities. The Outpatient & Private Diagnostic Wing (Mezzanine to 4th Floors) houses 110 private doctor consulting suites, institutional outpatient department (OPD) offices, and administrative offices for residency training programs. The Academic Core (5th Floor) contains the main administrative headquarters for the School of Medicine (UCSM), faculty consultation suites, group study areas, and the dedicated Medical Library with clinical archives. The Laboratories (6th and 7th Floors) feature amphitheater-style layouts designed to support outcome-based medical training.

== Administration and organization ==
The University of Cebu (UC) is governed by a central executive structure led by Board Chairman and President Atty. Augusto W. Go and Chancellor Candice G. Gotianuy. This executive tier is responsible for institutional strategy and financial oversight across all university properties. An Executive Vice Chancellor manages the implementation of policies, student affairs, and macro-level operations, while a Vice Chancellor for Administrative Affairs centralizes non-academic services, including human resources, facility maintenance, procurement, and security across the university system. Operational management is decentralized across five distinct geographic hubs—UC Main, UC Banilad, UCLM, UC METC, and UC South (Pardo–Talisay) are each overseen by a Campus Director who manages local logistics and personnel. The Basic Education Department, which includes kindergarten, elementary, junior high, and senior high school levels, is integrated into these campuses. Each basic education unit is managed by a Campus Principal responsible for instructional schedules, staff monitoring, and compliance with Department of Education (DepEd) regulations, while relying on the central administration for financial and facility support.

The University of Cebu School of Medicine (UCSM) functions as an autonomous academic unit due to its specialization and integration with the University of Cebu Medical Center (UCMed). Chancellor Candice G. Gotianuy maintains corporate oversight, while academic governance is directed by the Dean of Medicine and an academic committee of practicing physicians. This dean-led structure coordinates directly with UCMed's clinical department heads and medical directors to align the medical curriculum with clinical clerkships and training protocols within the active hospital facility.

The University of Cebu (UC) organizes its academic programs into specific undergraduate colleges, professional graduate schools, and basic education departments across its campus system.

=== Colleges and schools ===
- College of Arts and Sciences (Main, Banilad)
- College of Business and Accountancy (Main, Banilad, UCLM, South)
- College of Customs Administration (Main, UCLM, South)
- College of Computer Studies (Main, Banilad, UCLM, South)
- College of Criminal Justice (Main, Banilad, UCLM, South)
- College of Engineering (Main Campus, UCLM)
- College of Hospitality and Tourism Management (Main, UCLM, South)
- College of Maritime Education (UCMETC Mambaling, UCLM)
- College of Nursing (Banilad, Main, UCLM, South)
- College of Teacher Education (Main, UCLM, South)
- School of Law (Banilad)
- Graduate School (Main)
- School of Medicine (UCMed)

=== Basic Education Department ===
- UC Main Campus (Junior & Senior High School )
- UC Banilad Campus (Junior & Senior High School)
- UC Lapu-Lapu Mandaue Campus (UCLM) (Elementary, Junior & Senior High School)
- UC METC Campus (K-12)
- UC South (Pardo–Talisay) Campus (K-12)

== Academics ==
The University of Cebu (UC) organizes its academic programs into specialized undergraduate colleges, professional graduate schools, and basic education departments distributed across its multi-campus system.

UC offers more than 25 bachelor's degree programs, 9 master's degree programs, 3 doctoral programs, and 2 Professional degrees. Undergraduate coursework includes programs in business administration, engineering, information technology, criminology, and maritime education. The graduate division offers advanced degrees such as the Doctor of Education (Ed.D.) and Doctor in Business Administration (DBA), while the 2 professional programs consist of the Juris Doctor (JD) at the College of Law and the Doctor of Medicine (MD) at the School of Medicine.

=== Recognition and accreditation ===
The Commission on Higher Education (CHED) has designated specific programs across the University of Cebu campus system as Centers of Excellence (COE) or Centers of Development (COD). The Lapu-Lapu and Mandaue (UCLM) campus holds a Center of Excellence in Maritime Education. It also shares a Center of Development in Teacher Education designation with the Banilad campus. The university's Main Campus holds a Center of Development in Criminology. It also hold regional distinctions from PACUCOA for having numerous accredited programs. Individual programs maintain various accredited levels, such as Level III Status for Allied Health.

== Student life ==
Student life at the University of Cebu (UC) includes academic support, organized student groups, and participation in cultural and community activities across its campuses. The Student Affairs Office (SAO) oversees these organizations and coordinates their activities.

=== Housing ===
UC offers on-campus housing at the UC-METC campus in Mambaling, which consists of dedicated dormitories for international maritime scholars and Norwegian Shipowners Association (NSA) cadets living under supervised naval discipline. The general student body at the Main, Banilad, UCLM, and South campuses utilizes off-campus housing including boarding houses, commercial student dorms, apartments and condominiums.

=== Student organizations ===
Some student organizations include:

The University of Cebu Council of Presidents (UCCP) serves as the highest student government body across all UC campuses, comprising the individual student presidents from each campus and academic college and departments. The council coordinates student welfare initiatives, oversees cross-departmental programs, and manages university-wide traditions.

Academic and professional organizations where each college supports student groups focused on professional development, such as the Junior Philippine Institute of Accountants, Programmer’s Guild, Psychology Club, Junior Philippine Society of Mechanical Engineers,the Criminology Society, and the UC Law Students Society (UCLASS).

Cultural and performance groups include the UC Folkloric Dance Troupe, UC Chorus, Drum and Bugle Corps, and Cheer and Dance Team.

The Webmasters Esports Organization is the primary student-led esports group at the UC Main, UCLM, and Banilad campuses, with dedicated chapters at each location. The organization manages official campus rosters, conducts recruitment tryouts including for both Women's and Men's Valorant teams—and hosts community gaming events for students.

=== Medias and publications ===
Student-led media outlets at the University of Cebu are campus-specific publications that report on university activities and student affairs. Lakandiwa serves as the flagship, official student publication for the UC Main Campus, while the FOCUS Publication handles digital and visual reporting for the UC Lapu-Lapu and Mandaue (UCLM) campus. Additionally, UC Sangdiwa operates within the system to provide journalistic coverage for the university's basic education branches.

The Serviant is the official specialized publication of the University of Cebu School of Medicine (UCSM), tracking clinical research, hospital updates, and medical student features.

UC Business Journal is a registered print publication managed by the University of Cebu that focuses specifically on localized business sectors, student entrepreneurship, and economics.

=== Traditions and events ===
The official colors of the University of Cebu are Blue and Yellow. Blue symbolizes trust, academic excellence, and professionalism, while Yellow represents optimism, cultural enrichment, and the university's commitment to giving affordable "education for all."

Tambay sa UC is a welcome event that formally kicks off the new academic year held annually in August at the Cebu Coliseum. This major orientation introduces incoming students to campus life through official presentations and high-energy performances from the varsity teams and the UC Drum and Bugle Corps, and others.

Intramurals at UC feature separate opening weeks and elimination rounds for each campus. While UC Main and UC-METC coordinate their schedules at the Cebu Coliseum, other campuses—including UC Lapu-Lapu and Mandaue, Banilad, and South Campus which hold independent tournament games on their own grounds, competing across departments and colleges.

The Confetti Drop is a trademark tradition at the University of Cebu, celebrated across all campuses to officially kick off the academic year and launch the campus intramurals.

CCS ICT Congress is an annual event held every April at the Cebu Coliseum, where the College of Computer Studies (CCS) brings together students from all campuses for technology exhibitions highlighting artificial intelligence (AI), software engineering, digital transformation, and related innovations.

Every January, students and staff from all UC campuses participate in the Sinulog Festival, providing logistical support as marshals, ushers, and event personnel during novenas, processions, and the Grand Parade. Members of the UC Dance Troupe and Drum and Bugle Corps also showcase their talents through performances at Sinulog related events.

Ring Hop and Hooding Ceremonies are formal events where major professional students, such as the College of Business and Accountancy, host grand ballroom gatherings at premier local hotels to honor graduating cohorts with symbolic ring rites prior to their official commencement exercises.

The University of Cebu Student Media Congress is an annual system-wide convention organized by the university's Student Affairs Office and Institutional Marketing team to unite, train, and empower campus journalists across all UC campuses held at the UC Main Jones Building.

== Athletics ==
The University of Cebu is a current member of the Cebu Schools Athletic Foundation, Inc. (CESAFI)and was also a member of the CESAFI's precursor, the Cebu Amateur Athletic Association (CAAA). It also participates in PRISAA games played as UC Webmasters, the school's varsity name.

In 2010, their basketball team, known as the Webmasters, became the first team other than the University of Visayas to win the basketball championship. The Webmasters were able to defend their title the following year. Their MVP, June Mar Fajardo, along with Brian Heruela, went on to have successful careers in the pros. Another former player, Dondon Hontiveros, was also a star player for UC in the CAAA.

The University of Cebu has also been successful in other sports. In 2010, they won the men's football tournament. Five years later, the men's football team won once again. UC also won six gold medals in taekwondo in 2014. In 2017, they won the dancesport competition. In 2019, weightlifter Elreen Ando won gold in the 64-kg category of the CESAFI women’s division. She went on to represent the Philippines in the 2020 Tokyo Olympics. In 2022, they won the most medals in swimming. In 2023, they won the men's beach volleyball tournament.

== Incidents ==
Ronnel Baguio, a Marine Engineering student at the University of Cebu, died in December 2022, allegedly due to injuries from a fraternity hazing.

== See also ==
- College of Technological Sciences–Cebu
- Lourdes Libres Rosaroso
