= Sacred Heart School – Ateneo de Cebu =

Roman Catholic Chinese school in Mandaue, Philippines

- 宿务亞典耀聖心學校
- Official seal of SHS-AdC

Location
- H. Abellana St., Brgy. Canduman; Mandaue City, Cebu; Philippines
- 10°22′02.6″N 123°55′34.9″E

Information
- Former names: Sacred Heart Chinese Academy Colegio de San Jose Recoletos (1954–1955); Sacred Heart School (1955–1958); Sacred Heart School for Boys (1958–1998); Sacred Heart School-Jesuit (1998–2010)
- Type: Private, Catholic, Chinese, Co-educational, Basic (K-12) education institution
- Motto: Latin: Lux Oriens; English: A Light Arising in the Land of the Morning
- Religious affiliations: Catholic (Jesuit)
- Established: 1955; 71 years ago
- Founder: Society of Jesus
- President: Michael Pineda
- Chairman: Mario King
- Director: Gilbert Emmanuel P.Levosada (Director of Formation / Chaplain)
- Principal: Lea P. Amores (Grade School); Roberto Joseph A. Galvan (Junior High School); Annie F. Abucay (Senior High School)
- Grades: K to 12
- Gender: Boys only (until 2000); Coeducation (since 2000)
- Campuses: Urban: Main campus H. Abellana St., Brgy. Canduman, Mandaue City, Philippines; Satellite campus General Maxilom Avenue, Lorega San Miguel, Cebu City, Philippines
- Colors: Blue, gold, white
- Song: Lux Oriens
- Athletics conference: CESAFI
- Nickname: Magis Eagles
Affiliations
PAASCU; ANTEP; JBEC	CEAP; PERAA
- Website: www.shs-adc.edu.ph

Sacred Heart School – Ateneo de Cebu (SHS-AdC) (commonly referred to as Ateneo de Cebu), (Chinese: 宿务亞典耀聖心學校; pinyin: Sùwù Yàdiǎnyào Shèngxīn Xuéxiào; Pe̍h-ōe-jī: Sok-bū A-tián-iāu Sèng-sim Ha̍k-hāu) formerly known as Sacred Heart School for Boys (SHS-B), is a private, Catholic, Chinese-Filipino college-preparatory, K-12 school run by the Philippine Province of the Society of Jesus in Mandaue City, Philippines. It was established in 1955 with a curriculum that includes a Chinese language course.

On March 4, 2010, the board of trustees of the Sacred Heart School unanimously approved the changing of the school's official name to Sacred Heart School – Ateneo de Cebu. Previously, its name was Sacred Heart School of the Society of Jesus or Sacred Heart School – Jesuit (SHS-J). After its renaming, SHS-AdC became the ninth Jesuit school in the Philippines to bear the Ateneo name.

Sacred Heart School – Ateneo de Cebu also serves as a bridge between the Filipino and Chinese Filipino communities through Christian education that accepts not only Chinese Filipinos but also students who have no Chinese roots.

== History ==
In 1953, Paul O'Brien, then the superior of all Jesuits belonging to the former missions in China, was approached by the Catholic Chinese-Filipino community of Cebu City regarding the possibility of establishing a school that has a Chinese language program in its curriculum for the education of their children.

Once approval was secured from the Superior General of the Jesuits in Rome, the school initially operated as a Chinese school annex of the Colegio de San Jose-Recoletos (now USJ-R). Fray Martin Legarra, ORSA of San Jose-Recoletos generously provided Sacred Heart with a Principal (Mr. Genaro Maramara) and a contingent of lay faculty members.

In 1955, Sacred Heart School was officially established as an independent school, built along General Maxilom Avenue, Barangay Lorega San Miguel, Cebu City, with Francisco Heras, one of the Jesuits expelled from Communist China, as its first school head.

On February 25, 1965, Sacred Heart School became a Filipino school, approved by the Bureau of Education to teach the regular curriculum prescribed by the government with a Chinese Language and Arts program.

The integration of the Jesuits of the China Province delegation in the Philippines into the Jesuit Philippine Province on September 27, 1988, resulted in all the former delegation works being placed under the care and control of the Philippine Jesuit provincial superior. This facilitated the assignment of Filipino Jesuits to the three Chinese-Filipino schools run by the Jesuits: the Sacred Heart School – Ateneo de Cebu (Cebu), Ateneo de Iloilo – Santa Maria Catholic School (Iloilo), and Xavier School (San Juan, Metro Manila).

Originally called Sacred Heart School for Boys, the name of the school was officially changed to Sacred Heart School – Jesuit (SHS-J) in 2000. That school year (2000–2001), SHS-J began accepting girls in the Grade School Department, and in 2006 produced its first batch of graduates with female students.

=== Expansion ===
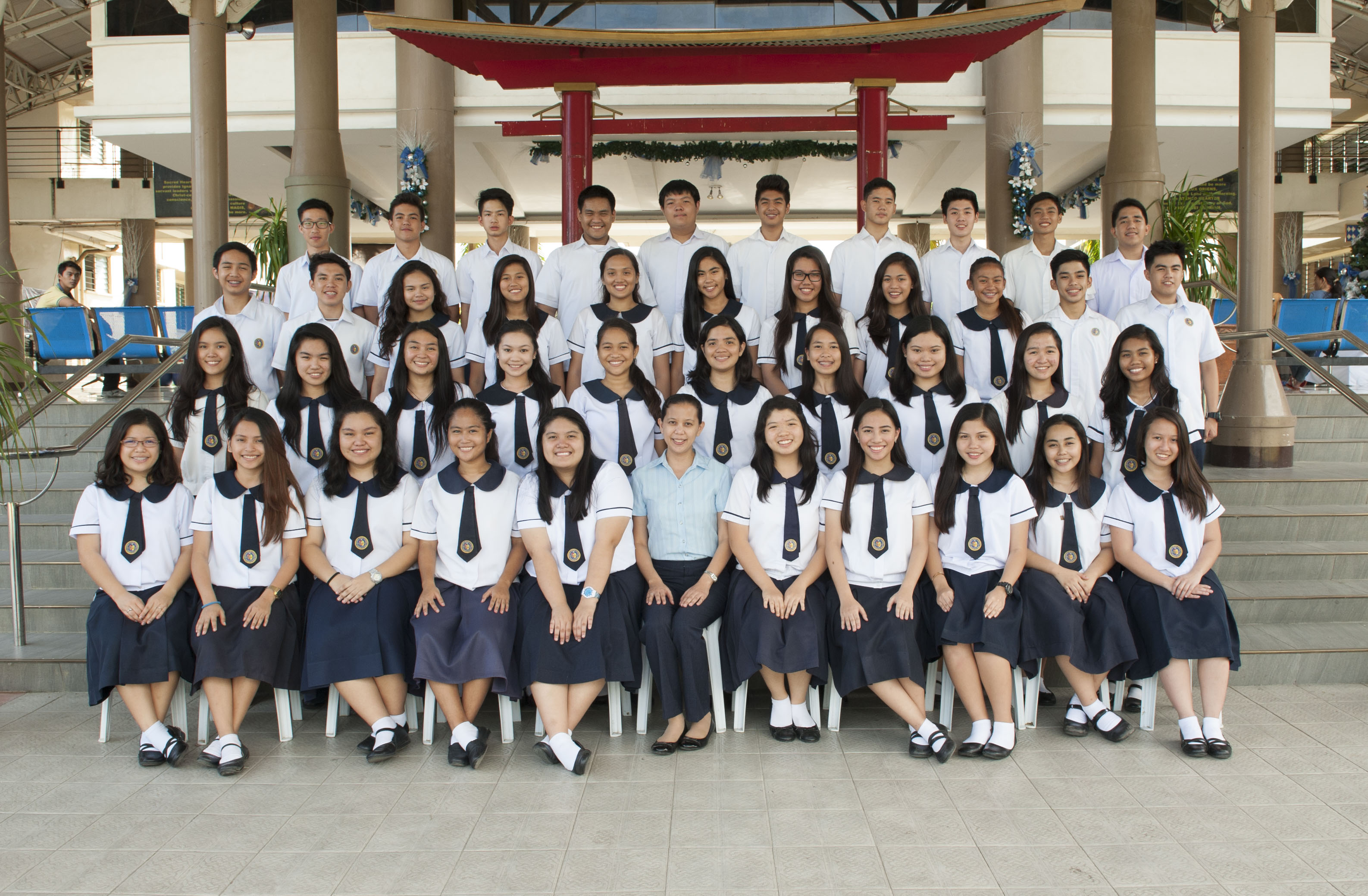
Sacred Heart School – Ateneo de Cebu's Honors class of the Grade 10 Level of School Year 2015 – 2016, Grade 10 – St. Ignatius of Loyola.

The student population of SHS-J began to grow after becoming coeducational. The General Maxilom campus became inadequate. The school transferred to a more modern and larger campus along H. Abellana Street, Barangay Canduman, Mandaue City, in 2007. On August 24, 2008, the new campus was solemnly blessed by Cardinal Ricardo J. Vidal, Archbishop of Cebu, in the presence of President Gloria Macapagal-Arroyo, Jose Cecilio Magadia (Provincial of the Philippine Province of the Society of Jesus), Jesuit priests, benefactors, notable alumni, and local government leaders.

On December 12, 2018, the newest building, Cor Iesu Oratory, was solemnly inaugurated and blessed by the Superior General of the Society of Jesus, Arturo Sosa, coinciding with his pastoral visit to the Philippines. This new prayer venue is a product of collaboration of multi-awarded industrial designer Kenneth Cobonpue, Buck Richnold Sia and Zubu Design Associates, Bryant Auman, consultant on the use of bamboo, and Veepee Pinpin, a liturgical architecture consultant. In July 2019, this building became part of the shortlist (finalist) of the Completed Buildings – Religion category of the World Architecture Festival.

=== Name change ===
On March 4, 2010, the board of trustees of the Sacred Heart School approved the changing of the school's name to Sacred Heart School – Ateneo de Cebu.

==== Ateneo name ====
The Ateneo de Cebu is not the only Jesuit school that the Jesuits named Ateneo. The Society of Jesus has established sixteen schools all over the Philippines since 1590. Nine of them were given the name Ateneo. Ateneo de Cebu is the ninth school that the Jesuits named Ateneo. Over the years, the name "Ateneo" has been recognized as educational institutions run by the Jesuits in the Philippines.

=== K to 12 program ===
In 2015, the Department of Education of the Philippines (DepEd) announced that an extra two years of schooling will be required from every student in the Philippines. This campaign, known commonly as the K to 12 Program or simply K-12, would standardize Philippine education, thus turning secondary or high school education in the Philippines into a period of six years, as prior to this, Philippine high school only lasted four school years.

Sacred Heart School – Ateneo de Cebu adapted to the change by launching its Senior High School Program, a program which accommodates both eleventh and twelfth grade students. It began the construction of a new Senior High School building solely for the eleventh and twelfth grade levels, which was completed in May 2016.

== Sports program ==
The school is known for its multi sports program and is a member of the Cebu Schools Athletic Foundation (CESAFI), an athletic organization composed of schools in the province of Cebu. It has varsity teams in the following sports: basketball, football, volleyball, badminton, chess, swimming, table tennis, taekwondo, track and field, archery and tennis. Teams which represent the school in inter-school tournaments are called by the name Magis Eagles.

== Accreditation and affiliations ==
Sacred Heart School's High School Department was accredited in 1972 by the Philippine Accrediting Association of Schools, Colleges and Universities (PAASCU). The Grade School Department was accredited in 1975. Both Departments have been re-accredited every five years.

Sacred Heart School – Ateneo de Cebu is a member of the Philippine Accrediting Association of Schools, Colleges and Universities (PAASCU), Catholic Educational Association of the Philippines (CEAP), Private Education Retirement Annuity Association (PERAA), Association for Non-Traditional Education in the Philippines (ANTEP), Jesuit Education Association (JEA), Jesuit Chinese-Filipino Apostolate (JCFA), and Jesuit Basic Education Commission (JBEC).

== Notable alumni ==
- Kenneth Cobonpue – Furniture designer and manufacturer
- Tomas Osmeña – Current Cebu City Vice Mayor (formerly Mayor of Cebu City)
- Fr. Primitivo Viray, S.J. – Former Jesuit Provincial
- Richard Yap – Actor
- Fr. Roberto Yap, S.J. – President of Ateneo de Manila University
- Msgr. Jan Thomas Limchua, JCD - Counselor of the Apostolic Nunciature to the Kingdom of the Netherlands
- Ar. Omar Maxwell Espina - Principal Architect, Espina, Perez-Espina and Associates; Lead Architect of SHS-AdC Canduman Campus
- Regan Rex T. King - 52nd President, Cebu Chamber of Commerce and Industry; COO 6R Mercantile Inc.; Managing Dir., RDAK Global Motors
- Jose Franco Boremeo Soberano – COO of Cebu Landmasters and Consul for Finland-Cebu

== See also ==
- List of Jesuit sites
