= Ecclesia =

Ecclesia or Ekklesia (Ancient Greek: ἐκκλησία, romanized: ekklēsia) may refer to:

== Organizations ==
- Ecclesia (ancient Greece) or ekklēsia, the principal assembly of ancient Greece during its Golden Age
- Ekklesia, generally thought to have been the name of the ancient Spartan Assembly.
- The Greek and Latin term for the Christian Church as a whole
- Ekklesia (think tank), a British think tank examining the role of religion in public life
- Ecclesia College, a four-year Christian work college in Springdale, Arkansas
- Ekklesia Project, an ecumenical Christian network to promote a more active and God-centered faith
- Ecclesia Athletic Association, a youth athletic program in the United States
- Qahal or Ekklesia, a theocratic organisational structure in ancient Israelite society

== Religion ==
- Ecclesia Dei, a statement or motu proprio issued by Pope John Paul II in 1988
- Ecclesiae Regimen, a reformation declaration against the Church in England of the Late Middle Ages
- Ecclesia and Synagoga, a pair of figures personifying the Roman Catholic Church and the Jewish synagogue found in medieval Christian art
- Church militant and church triumphant (ecclesia militans, ecclesia triumphans), Christians who are living on earth and those who are in heaven
- Mater Ecclesiae, a monastery inside Vatican City
- Mother Church (Latin Mater Ecclesiae), a reference to the Roman Catholic Church, or to other Christian churches or movements
- Nea Ekklesia, a church built by Byzantine Emperor Basil I the Macedonian in Constantinople between the years 876–80
- Christian Church, the whole Christian religious tradition throughout history
- Congregation is a large gathering of people, often for the purpose of worship.
- In the sociological classifications of religious movements, a religion less pervasive in a society than a church but more so than a sect

=== Religious movements ===
- Ecclesia Gnostica, a neo-Gnostic church based in the United States
- Ecclesia Gnostica Catholica, a Gnostic church organization
- Ecclesia Pistis Sophia, a Gnostic church organization based in the United States
- Ecclesia Gnostica Apostolica Catholica (Gnostic Church of France)
- Holy Ecclesia of Jesus, an independent Japanese Christian denomination founded by Ōtsuki Takeji (大槻武二) in 1946
- Japan Ecclesia of Christ, an independent Japanese Christian church founded by Koike Tasuo (小池辰雄) in 1940

== Other uses ==
- Ekklesia, a 2008 album by For Today
- Castlevania: Order of Ecclesia, a 2008 Nintendo DS video game
- Mount Ecclesia, nature grounds in Oceanside, California with the international headquarters of The Rosicrucian Fellowship
- Ecclesia orans, an academic journal on Christian liturgy
- The bi-annual international convention and governing body of the Fraternity of Phi Gamma Delta
- The seventh song on Kamelot's album "Haven" is titled "Ecclesia"

== See also ==
- Ecclesia Catholica (disambiguation)
- Ecclesiastes (disambiguation)
- Ad Universalis Ecclesiae, an 1862 papal constitution by Pope Pius IX dealing with the conditions for admission to Catholic religious orders
- Advocatus Ecclesiae, lay persons of noble birth who defended a particular church or monastery during the Middle Ages
- De triumphis ecclesiae, a Latin epic written c. 1250 by Johannes de Garlandia
- Ecclesiam a Jesu Christo, a Papal constitution promulgated by Pius VII in 1821
- Ecclesiam suam, a 1964 encyclical of Pope Paul VI on the Catholic Church
- Ex Corde Ecclesiae, a 1990 apostolic constitution written by Pope John Paul II regarding Catholic colleges and universities
- Extra Ecclesiam nulla salus, a Latin phrase meaning "Outside the Church there is no salvation"
- Fasti Ecclesiae Scoticanae, a list of ministers from the Established Church of Scotland
- Fabrica ecclesiae, a Roman Catholic Latin term for the funds necessary for the construction of a church
- Lamentatio sanctae matris ecclesiae Constantinopolitanae, a motet by the Renaissance composer Guillaume Dufay
- Libertas ecclesiae, emancipation from ecclesiastical authority, which guided the movement of Reform begun in the 11th century
- Ordinarium Sanctae Romanae Ecclesiae, a document that established a voting procedure for the papal conclave
- Regimini militantis Ecclesiae, a papal bull promulgated by Pope Paul III in 1540 establishing the Jesuits
- Universalis Ecclesiae, an 1850 bull of Pope Pius IX that recreated the Roman Catholic hierarchy in England
