= Men's National Collegiate Athletic Association =

The Men's National Collegiate Athletic Association is an athletic association in the Philippines, and is the direct counterpart of the older Women's National Collegiate Athletic Association (founded in 1970). The Men's National Collegiate Athletic Association (MNCAA) is exclusive for men. The MNCAA was founded in 2004. Competition is divided into three divisions: Seniors for college students, Juniors for high school students, and Midgets for grade school and first year high school students. The competing sports of the tournament are Basketball, Volleyball, Futsal, Table Tennis, Badminton and Streetdance.

== Member schools ==
=== Metro Manila ===
==== Colleges ====
Institution	Seniors	Juniors	Women	Status	Founded	Affiliation (Population)	Color	Location
Enderun Colleges	Titans	Junior Titans	Lady Titans	Private (Non-Sectarian)	2005	Non-Sectarian (200-400)	Bronze & Burgundy	McKinley Hill, Bonifacio Global City, Taguig
Thames International – Business School				Private (Non-Sectarian)	1999			
University of Asia and the Pacific	Dragons	Junior Dragons	Lady Dragons	Private/Catholic (Opus Dei)	1967			
Centro Escolar University	Scorpions	Junior Scorpions	Lady Scorpions	Private (Non-Sectarian)	1907			
St. Paul University Manila	Gladiators	Junior Gladiators	Lady Gladiators	Private/Catholic (Sisters of Charity of St. Paul)	1912			
La Consolacion College	Blue Royals	Junior Blue Royals	Lady Blue Royals	Private/Catholic (Augustinian Sisters)	1902			
San Beda College Alabang	Red Lions	Junior Red Lions	Lady Red Lions	Private/Catholic (Benedictine)	1972			
Philippine Women's University	Patriots	Junior Patriots	Lady Patriots	Private/Private (Non-Sectarian)	1919			

==== High school ====
- St. Stephen's High School- Stephenians

=== Cordillera Administrative Region ===
- Baguio Central University BCU Eagles
- Baguio Colleges Foundation BCF
- Benguet State University BSU
- Cordillera Career Development College CCDC Admirals
- Pines City College PCC
- STI Colleges, Baguio STI Baguio Olympians
- St. Louis University (Baguio) SLU Navigators
- University of Baguio UB Cardinals
- University of the Cordilleras UC Jaguars
- University of the Philippines Baguio UPB Fighting Maroons

=== Central Luzon ===
Institution	Seniors	Juniors	Women	Status	Founded	Affiliation (Population)	Color	Location
Bulacan State University	Gold Gears	Junior Gold Gears	Lady Gold Gears					
Holy Angel University	Flyers	Junior Flyers	Lady Flyers					
Lyceum of Subic Bay	Sharks	Junior Sharks	Lady Sharks					
Tarlac State University	Tigers	Junior Tigers	Tigress					
University of the Assumption	Blue Pelicans	Junior Blue Pelicans	Lady Blue Pelicans	Private/Catholic (Dominican Sisters)				
St. Scholastica's Academy, San Fernando								

=== Calabarzon ===
Institution	Seniors	Juniors	Women	Status	Founded	Affiliation (Population)	Color	Location
Batangas State University	Red Spartans	Junior Red Spartans	Lady Red Spartans					
Cavite State University	Hornets	Junior Hornets	Lady Hornets					
De La Salle Lipa	Chevrons	Junior Chevrons	Lady Chevrons					
La Salle College Antipolo	Voyagers	Junior Voyagers	Voyagers					
Laguna College of Business and Arts	Lycans	Junior Lycans	Lady Lycans					
University of Perpetual Help System Laguna	Saints	Junior Saints	Lady Saints					
University of the Philippines Los Baños	Elbis	Junior Elbis	Lady Elbis					

=== Bicol Region ===
Institution	Seniors	Juniors	Women	Status	Founded	Affiliation (Population)	Color	Location
University of Santo Tomas–Legazpi	Phoenix	Junior Phoenix	Lady Phoenix					
Ateneo de Naga University	Gold Knights	Junior Gold Knights	Lady Gold Knights					
Bicol University	Whale Sharks	Junior Whale Sharks	Lady Whale Sharks					
Divine Word College of Legazpi	Divinians	Junior Divinians	Divinians					
Universidad de Sta. Isabel	Vicentians	Junior Vicentians	Lady Vicentians					
University of Nueva Caceres	Greyhounds	Junior Greyhounds	Lady Greyhounds					

=== Visayas ===
Institution	Seniors	Juniors	Women	Status	Founded	Affiliation (Population)	Color	Location
Colegio de Sta. Catalina de Alexandria								
Foundation University	Greywolves	Junior Greywolves	Lady Greywolves					
Holy Name University	Falcons	Junior Falcons	Lady Falcons					
Negros Oriental State University	Tigers	Junior Tigers	Tigress					
Silliman University	Blue Stallions	Junior Stallions	Lady Stallions					
St. Paul University Dumaguete	Saints	Junior Saints	Lady Saints					

== MNCAA Championships ==
- Badminton
- Basketball
- Table Tennis
- Volleyball
- Streetdance
- Futsal
