= San Beda University =

Roman Catholic university in Manila, Philippines

- Pamantasan ng San Beda (Filipino); Universidad de San Beda (Spanish)
- University Seal
- Former name: Colegio de San Beda (1901–2018)
- Motto: Fides, Scientia, Virtus (Latin)
- Motto in English: Faith, Knowledge, Virtue
- Type: Private, research, non-profit basic and higher education institution
- Established: June 17, 1901; 125 years ago
- Founders: Padre Juan Sabater, OSB
- Religious affiliation: Roman Catholic (Benedictines)
Academic affiliations
Mendiola Schools Consortium
ALNC; ASAIHL; ASEACCU AUAP; BENET CBCMMI	CEAP; FAAP; ICBE; PAASCU; SALT
- Chairman: Manuel Vélez Pangilinan
- Chancellor: Abbot Austin P. Cádiz, OSB
- Rector: Aloysius Ma. A. Maranan, OSB
- University Executive Assistant: Jobe B. Viernes
- Students: 8,500 (2021)
- Location: 638 Mendiola St., San Miguel, Manila, Metro Manila, Philippines; 14°35′58″N 120°59′32″E
- Campus: Urban; Main Mendiola, Manila 6 hectares (60,000 m^{2}) (Senior High School, Undergraduate Schools, Graduate Schools and Professional Schools); Satellite Barangay San Juan, Taytay, Rizal 11 hectares (110,000 m^{2}) (Pre School, Grade School and Junior High School)
- Alma Mater Song: Bedan Hymn
- Colors: Red White
- Nicknames: Red Lions (college men's varsity teams); Red Lionesses (college women's varsity teams); Red Cubs (High School boys' varsity teams)
- Sporting affiliations: NCAA, NCC, Shakey's Super League, V-League
- Mascot: Red Lion
Sports
Varsity sports:
Basketball Volleyball Beach Volleyball Football Badminton Chess	Taekwondo Table Tennis Lawn Tennis Soft Tennis Swimming Track & Field
- Website: www.sanbeda.edu.ph

- Location in Manila Location in Metro Manila Location in Luzon Location in the Philippines

San Beda University (Filipino: Pamantasan ng San Beda) is a private Catholic basic and higher education institution run by the Order of Saint Benedict in San Miguel, Manila, Philippines. It was founded by the Benedictines in 1901. The main campus is situated in Mendiola, San Miguel, Manila and provides tertiary education. It has a satellite campus that provides elementary and high school education in Taytay, Rizal.

San Beda was established in 1901 by monks of the Ordo Sancti Benedicti (OSB) or Order of St. Benedict, also known as the Benedictines. Its founder, St. Benedict, is acclaimed as the "Father of Western Monasticism" and the "Patron of Europe". It is attached to the Abbey of Our Lady of Montserrat, founded from the Abbey of Montserrat in Catalonia, Spain.

San Beda started as an all-boys grade school in Manila and given the name El Colegio de San Beda. It has since expanded to a full university with both undergraduate and post-graduate degree programs. The institution was given university status on February 6, 2018, making it the only Benedictine university found in the Asia-Pacific region.

== History ==
=== Origin ===
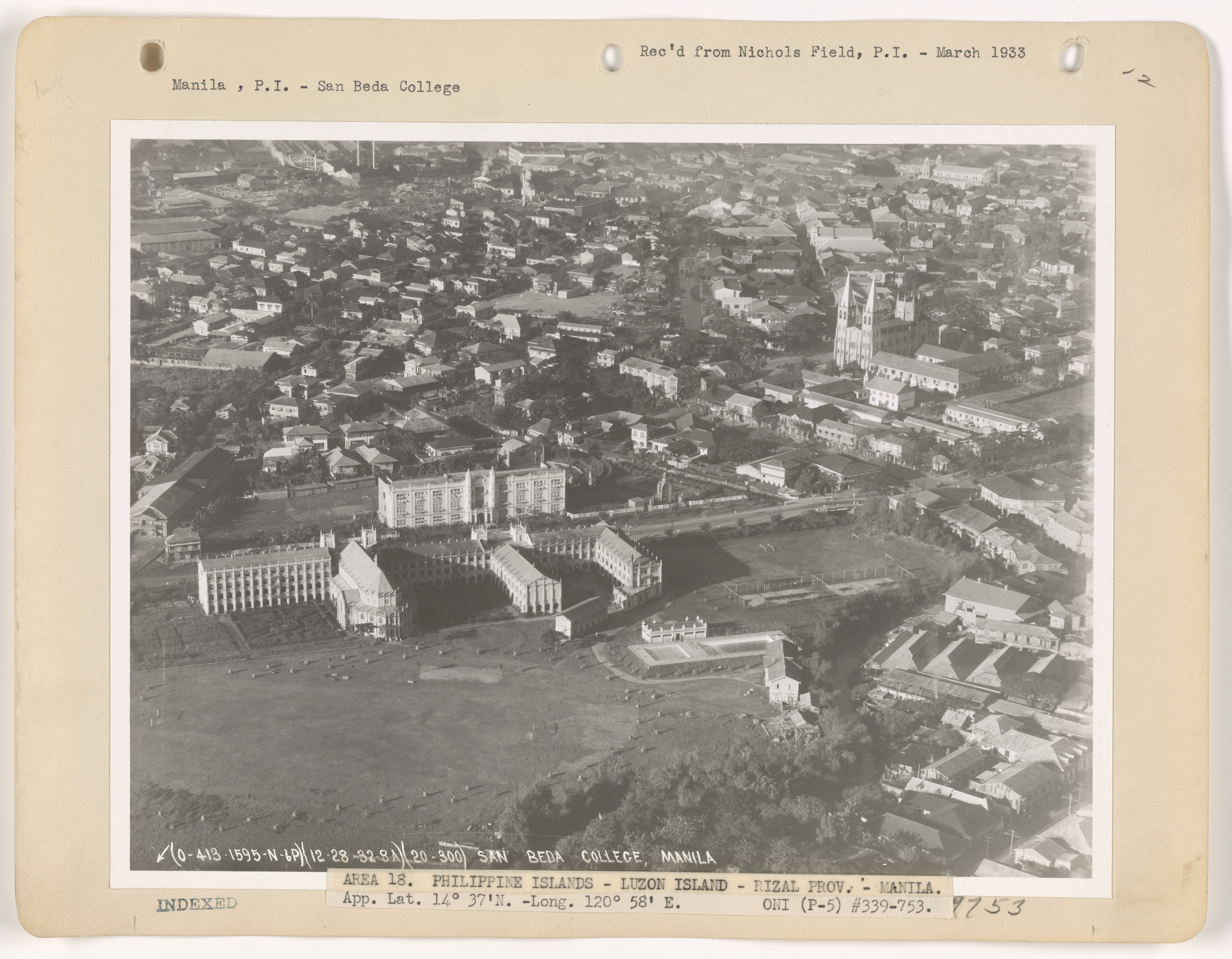
Aerial view of San Beda College, taken December 28, 1932 at around 8 AM

In 1895, 14 Benedictine monks from the Abbey of Our Lady of Montserrat in Spain arrived in the Philippines. Their intent was to do mission work in Surigao. However, as the Americans began to colonize the Islands, the Benedictine monks, fearing the spread of Protestantism, began to contemplate the idea of establishing a school dedicated to propagate and defend the Catholic faith. This vision was realized in 1901 when the monks transferred to Manila and Spanish Benedictine monk Fr. Juan Sabater OSB founded the El Colegio de San Beda, so named after the Venerable St. Bede of England. It was located in Arlegui Street.

During the inauguration of San Beda on June 17, 1901, Fr. Silvestre Jofre, OSB said in his homily that, “The College of San Beda comes to the arena with the sole purpose of helping to defend the Catholic battlements in the field of education.” The school opened exclusively for young boys with 212 students taking primaria enseñanza and secundaria enseñanza, the equivalent of grade school and high school with the first two years of college.

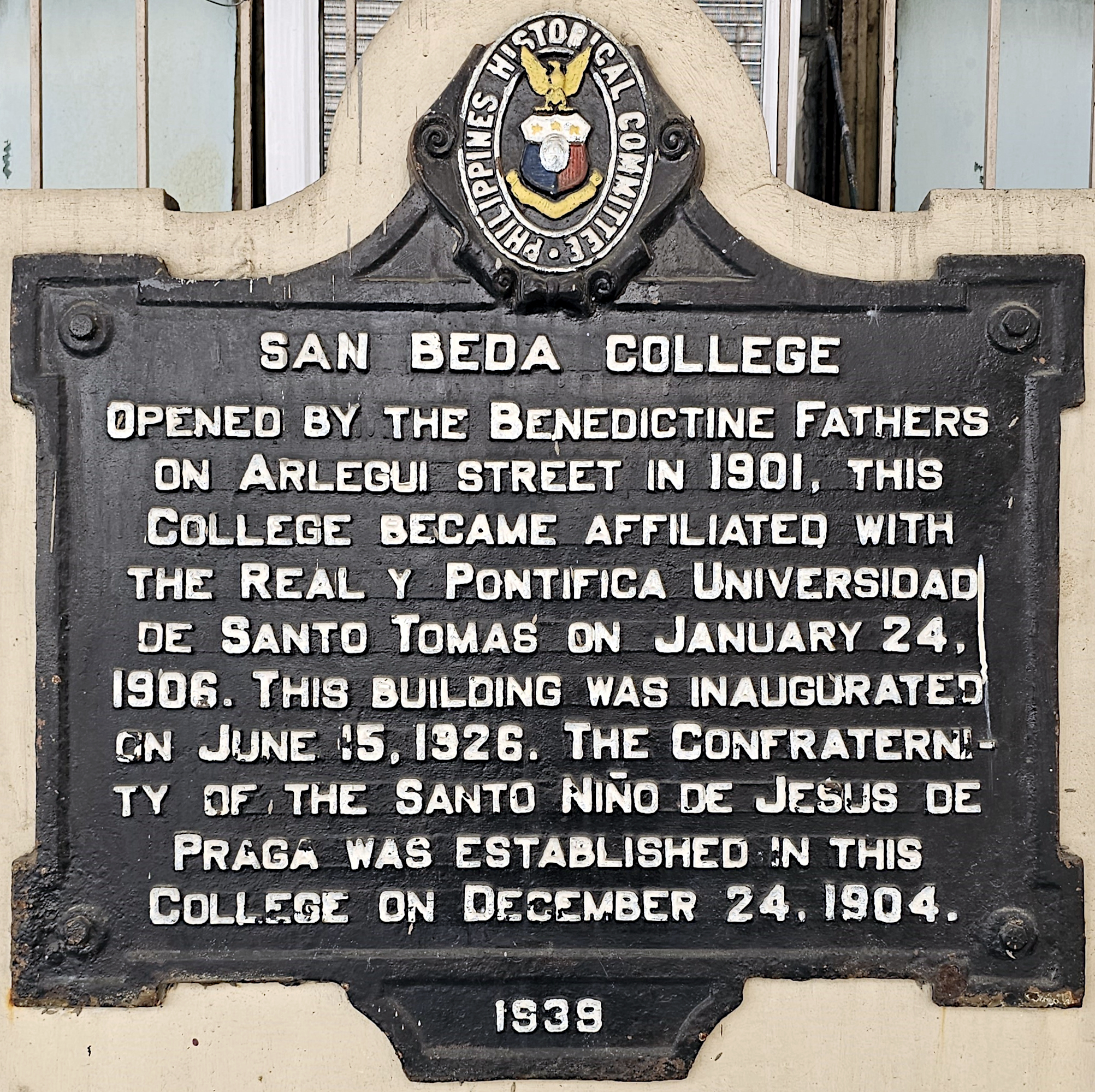
The original Philippines Historical Committee marker commemorating the then college was installed on October 21, 1939. However, it was stolen during World War II but later recovered in 1971 by Mr. Ramon Marcos in a nearby excavation along Legarda Street. It was then re-installed a year later by then Vice President of the San Beda Alumni Association Dr. Vicente Genato.

On 24 January 1906, San Beda College became affiliated with University of Santo Tomas. Bedan graduates were allowed to pursue further studies at UST without having to take qualifying exams. In 1910, however, the school revised its whole academic curriculum as a result of the requirements set by a new law in order for schools to be recognized by the government. San Beda became an independent private college with the authority to grant the Bachelor of Arts degree and diplomas in elementary and high school. It began to shift from Spanish to English as language of instruction and started to teach not only the English language but American history and politics as well. In 1916, Jesus Y. Mercado, a member of the Benedictine order, designed the first college seal. In 1918, as a result of the growing American influence, the college decided to drop its old name, El Colegio de San Beda, and began calling itself San Beda College.

In 1926, the Benedictine monks moved the school to Mendiola Street where it still stands. The transfer was needed to cope with demands for a bigger campus. By 1927, the courses offered by San Beda expanded and included grade school, high school, two-year courses of pre-medicine and pre-law, and the first two years of commerce. During that year, Bedan athletes won their first crown in the National Collegiate Athletics Association (NCAA) league.

From 1940 to 1947, the Abbey of Our Lady of Montserrat in Manila was under the apostolic administration of Abbot Alcuin Deutsch, OSB of St. John's Abbey, Collegeville, Minnesota. Three monks were sent to Manila to administer the Abbey and San Beda College. The college welcomed the only American rector in its history, Fr. Boniface Joseph Axtmann, OSB. In 1940 the school began to carry the Red Lion as its emblem. When World War II broke out, San Beda College was used by the Japanese Imperial Army as a garrison and supply depot. During these years, classes were held quietly in the Abbey of Our Lady of Montserrat, although classes were limited.

School coat of arms as San Beda College

After the liberation by joint Filipino and American troops, San Beda was used by the 60th U.S. Army Field Hospital briefly.

After the war, the school began to expand. After the priest Boniface Axtmann's liberal democratic style of running the college ended in 1947, a similar kind of leadership emerged under the administration of the Spanish Benedictine priest, Sergio Martinez, OSB. During his term, he decided to offer programs in arts, sciences, and jurisprudence. In 1948, Martinez formally established the San Beda College of Law. From 1952 to 1957, and 1960 to 1961, the San Beda Law School earned the distinction of producing a 100% passing record during the bar examinations. San Beda College became one of the founding schools of the Catholic Educational Association of the Philippines.

Eventually, San Beda College became a chartered school of the Philippine Accrediting Association of Schools, Colleges and Universities in 1957. Then Rector Fr. Benigno Benabarre, OSB was responsible for the school's inclusion in the PAASCU. He set up an alumni network of Bedans, which would eventually become the San Beda College Alumni Association.

On June 17, 2001, San Beda College celebrated its centennial. During the opening ceremonies for its pre-centennial in 2000, former president Corazon Aquino, Bedan alumni senators Raul Roco and Rene Saguisag and then rector-president Bernardo Ma. Perez, OSB graced the event.

In that same year, a new administration under Fr. Anscar J. Chupungco, OSB was installed. At the same time, San Beda College offered the Graduate Program in Business which was granted full autonomy and rated "very good" by the Commission on Higher Education.

On June 17, 2002, the San Beda College of Medicine and the Graduate Program in Liturgy were inaugurated, heralding the school's expansion program in health sciences. The following year, the College of Nursing and the Graduate School of Law were established. To give a more conducive academic environment to grade school and high school students, the San Beda College-Rizal campus was formally opened in June 2004. That same year, St. Benedict's College was formally renamed San Beda College Alabang.

On February 6, 2018, San Beda was granted University status by the Commission on Higher Education 501st Commission-en-Banc and Management Committee.

== Campuses ==
=== Mendiola Manila ===
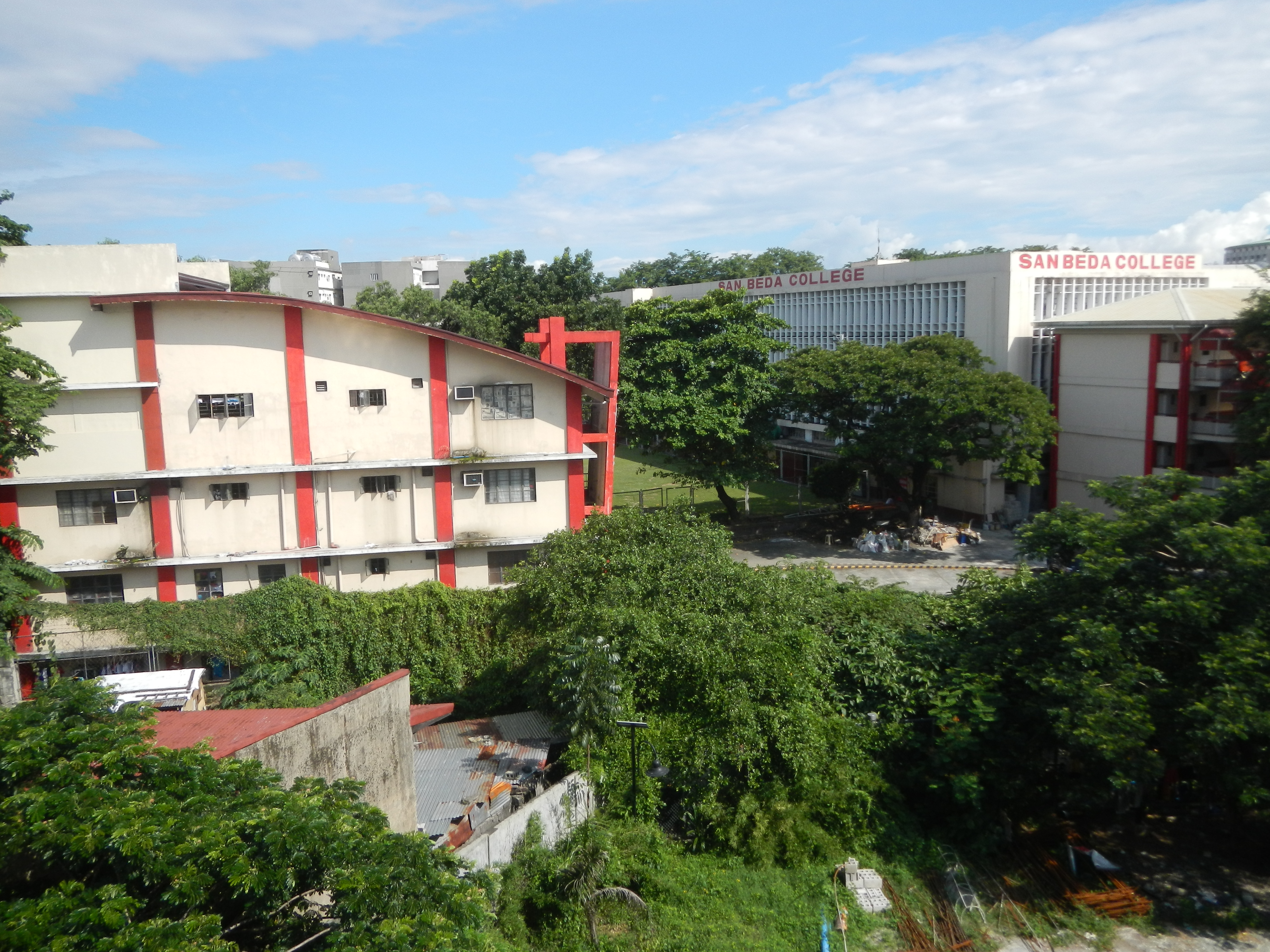
San Beda University. c. 2016

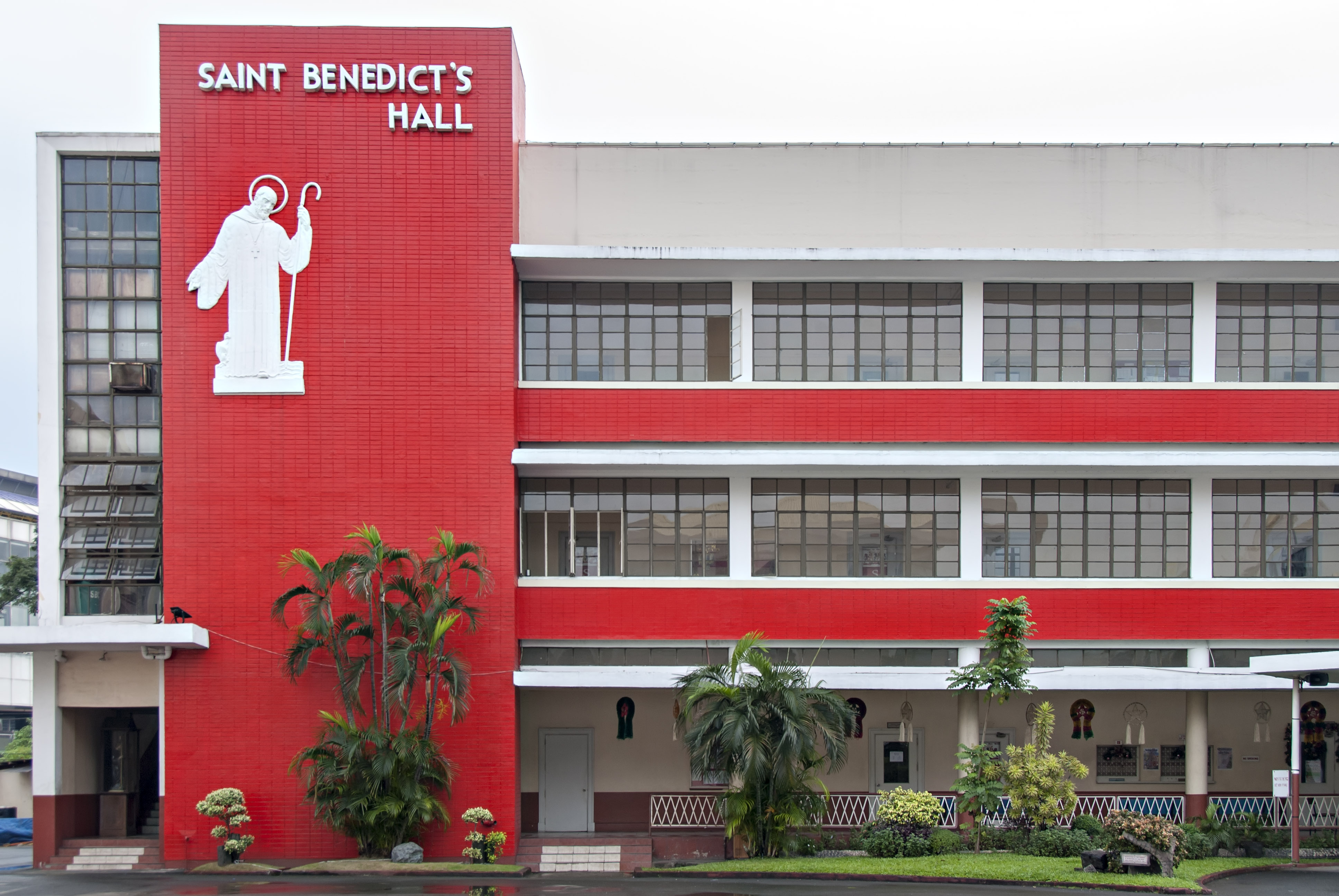
St. Benedict's Hall, 2013

The first San Beda campus was originally in Arlegui Street near the compound of the Malacañang Palace. The Benedictine college, however, decided to relocate the school and the order's monastery to Mendiola to accommodate an increasing student population. The Mendiola Campus formally opened in 1926.

Due to the social and political unrest during the 1970s, the Benedictine monks initially entertained the thought of leaving Mendiola and of transferring to Alabang where they recently acquired a property. The monastic fathers abandoned the idea and decided to stay in Mendiola and to build another campus in Alabang.

SBU Manila houses six colleges: Arts and Sciences, Accountancy and Business, Nursing, Education, Medicine, and Law. The three graduate schools of San Beda – Business, Law, and Liturgy – are in the Mendiola campus. The campus also houses the Senior High School Department of SBU Manila.

=== Taytay Rizal ===
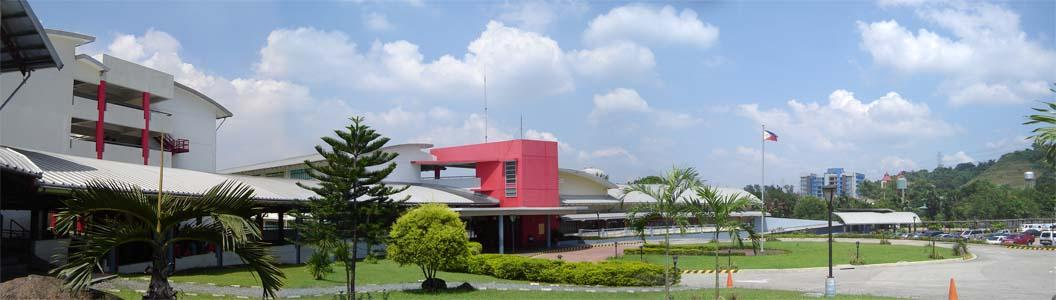
San Beda University IBED Campus (then San Beda College Rizal) c. 2017

The San Beda University Integrated Basic Education Department is located in the university's satellite campus in Barangay San Juan, Taytay, Rizal. It became operational when the Basic Education Department transferred from Mendiola in academic year 2004–2005, initially with nursery, Kinder, preparatory, grade 1, and first and second year high school levels. Thus, the primary, middle, and high schools became the units of the Integrated Basic Education Department (IBED). Moreover, the academic curriculum was re-aligned with the school's co-educational program and the phase-out of the grade and high school departments in the Mendiola campus. The last batch of Grade 6 students in Manila campus graduated in 2009 and 4th Year High School in 2006.

The Integrated Basic Education Department is composed of the following: Grade School, Junior High School, and Senior High School. Their IBED Department also offers Pre-School and Kinder programs as prescribed by the Department of Educations K-12 Curriculum.

== Undergraduate and graduate units ==
=== College of Arts and Sciences ===
The College of Arts and Sciences is the oldest college or tertiary level department in San Beda University. It was founded in the year 1910, making it the second oldest liberal arts college in the Philippine Isles. More fondly called by its acronym, "CAS," the Arts and Sciences department has brought many awards and achievements to San Beda University. The CAS was instrumental in San Beda University's being granted the Level III accreditation and reaccreditation in 2001, in 2003, and in 2014 respectively, by the PAASCU, as well as the autonomy status given by the Commission on Higher Education in 2003.

=== College of Nursing ===
The San Beda College of Nursing (CON) offers a Bachelor of Science in Nursing program. The CON began its operations 2003, in consortium with the Loyola Medical College Foundation chaired by Dr. Johnny Fong. The consortium with Loyola Foundation ended in 2008. The CON is now solely run by San Beda. The Nursing School of San Beda has been granted PAASCU Level I Accreditation.

=== College of Medicine ===
In addition to the Nursing department, the San Beda University administration put up another department to strengthen its health sciences program. The San Beda College of Medicine (SBCM) was formally established on March 9, 2002, with the task of offering a four-year course leading to the degree of Doctor of Medicine (M.D.) as its fifth unit. It has a faculty of over 70 medical lecturers, who come mostly from the University of the Philippines Manila.

The college occupies the St. Benedict's Hall. It uses several laboratories in St. Maur's Building along with other colleges and has a dedicated cadaver room on the third floor for its anatomy classes.

The CoM has sent examinees from its first class of graduates from the school year 2002–2003 to the August 2007 medical board exams.

=== College of Law ===
The San Beda College of Law (CoL) was founded in 1948 upon the initiative of former rector-president Fr. Sergio Martinez, OSB. Feliciano Jover Ledesma, an Ateneo graduate, was the first dean of the San Beda Law School. It sent bar candidates for the first time in 1952, who all passed the bar. From 1952 up to 1957, and 1960 to 1961, the San Beda Law School achieved the feat of attaining a 100 percent passing rate in the Bar Exams.

It has produced lawyers such as the 16th President of the Philippines Rodrigo Duterte, former Senator Rene Saguisag, the late Senator Raul S. Roco, Senator Leila M. De Lima, Former Commission on Elections Chairman Sixto Brillantes Jr., and twelve Justices of the Supreme Court – Florenz D. Regalado, the holder of the highest bar exam grade in the country, Justo P. Torres Jr., Antonio M. Martinez, Romeo J. Callejo Sr., Antonio Eduardo Nachura, Jose Catral Mendoza, Bienvenido Reyes, Samuel Martires, Noel Tijam, Ramon Paul Hernando, Mario Lopez, and Samuel Gaerlan.

=== Graduate Schools ===
- Graduate School of Business
- Graduate School of Law
- Graduate School of Liturgy

== Administration ==
The following is the list of people who have served as rector-presidents of San Beda University. All were monastics who are members of the Order of Saint Benedict.

RECTOR-PRESIDENTS
SAN BEDA COLLEGE
1901–03 – Silvestre Jofre; 1903–06 – Arsenio Insausti; 1906–09 – Silvestre Jofre; 1909–14 – Anselmo Catalán; 1914–18 – Fausto Ameijeiras; 1918–23 – Rosendo Fernández; 1923–24 – Ildefonso Sáez; 1925–27 – Urbano Caseres; 1927–37 – Bernardo López; 1937–39 – Beda del Hoyo	1939–41 – Wilfrido Rojo; 1941–47 – Boniface Axtman; 1947–48 – Urbano Caseres; 1948–49 – Sergio Martínez; 1949–52 – Bernardo López; 1952–55 – Wilfrido Rojo; 1956–58 – Wilfrido Rojo; 1958–61 – Bernardo López; 1961–66 – Benigno Benabarre; 1966–67 – Ildefonso Orígenes	1967–68 – Hildebrando Muñoz; 1968–71 – Isidro Otazu; 1971–74 – Bernardo Ma. Pérez; 1974–77 – Emmanuel Ma. Balcruz; 1977–83 – Bernardo Ma. Pérez; 1983–85 – Silvestre Lacson; 1985–2001 – Bernardo Ma. Pérez; 2001–07 – Anscar J. Chupungco; 2007–10 – Mateo Ma. J. De Jesus; 2010–18 – Aloysius Ma. A. Maranan
SAN BEDA UNIVERSITY
2018–22 - Aloysius Ma. A. Maranan		

== Architecture ==
Since its construction in Mendiola Street, majority of the buildings of San Beda University adapted the Neo-Gothic style of architecture. However, renovations have been made in some areas such as the tiles and gates. New structures were constructed such as the covered walk and pavilion near the entrance gate.

== School traditions ==
San Beda University adopted the Red Lion emblem from the ancient Scottish/English heraldic symbol, the Red Lion Rampant.

=== The Bedan hymn ===
Before the beginning of the 1960s, Bedans were singing a different school hymn. In 1966, Senator Raul Roco, then a San Beda Magna Cum Laude law student; Arturo Montesa, wrote a new alma mater hymn which would capture the Bedan spirit.

After finishing the lyrics, Roco then gave the lyrics to Rev. Fr. Benildus Ma (Manuel) Maramba, OSB for its melody, arrangements, and orchestration. It took Fr. Maramba two days to finish the song composition.

It is sung at important events such as the NCAA basketball tournaments, the Bar exams, alumni gatherings, and at simple affairs such as seminars and small get-together of Bedans.

=== Red Lion and The Ancient Red Lion Rampant ===
The Red Lion Rampant

The practice of adopting a school moniker became both fashionable and an imperative especially for Catholic schools named after saints during the 1940s in the Philippines.

American Catholic schools started the rage earlier when the clergy became wary of sports headlines such as “ St. Peter mauls St. Paul 80 – 40”. In the Philippines, headlines of whipping and trashing of schools named after saints drew mixed emotions among the clergy and devout Catholics. “Why would a Catholic saint whip another Catholic saint?”, they would ask.

On July 31, 1940, Fr. Sergio Martinez OSB, inspired by English tradition, coined the moniker “Red Lion” for the school. Red is the color of courage, of a warrior and a martyr. The lion, on the other hand, represents dominance as the king of the jungle.

=== Indian Yell ===
The San Beda Red Army cheering the Indian Yell

The Cuerba brothers, both Bedans, composed the Indian Yell in 1947 after the liberation from the Japanese empire. The Indian Yell was initially solely performed on drums accompanied by cheers from the students. However, this made the cheer somewhat lacking in power and needed something to rejuvenate the audience. So they changed the sound of the yell and incorporated a horn section. Accompanied by the tomahawk chop, the Indian Yell became more lively, intimidating, and full of spirit.

The Indian Yell is San Beda's romanticized version of the Indian war whoop. It mimics the native Indian war chants and vocalization techniques designed to intimidate the opponent. North American Indian war chants are verbalization of tunes that implore the great spirits to help them in battle. The romanticized Bedan Indian Yell is believed to have been inspired by the Plains Indian.

The Indian war whoop gave rise to derivative chants, most especially the Lion's Roar. The Lion's roar, with the simple "Wooohooo", mimics chants of Native American Indians. This is an indirect offspring of the Wahoos started by Dartmouth College and the University of Virginia in the 1890s. Bedans popularized this aboriginal Native American form of chanting in the Philippine collegiate league and has spawned variations now used by many other schools.

== Notable people ==
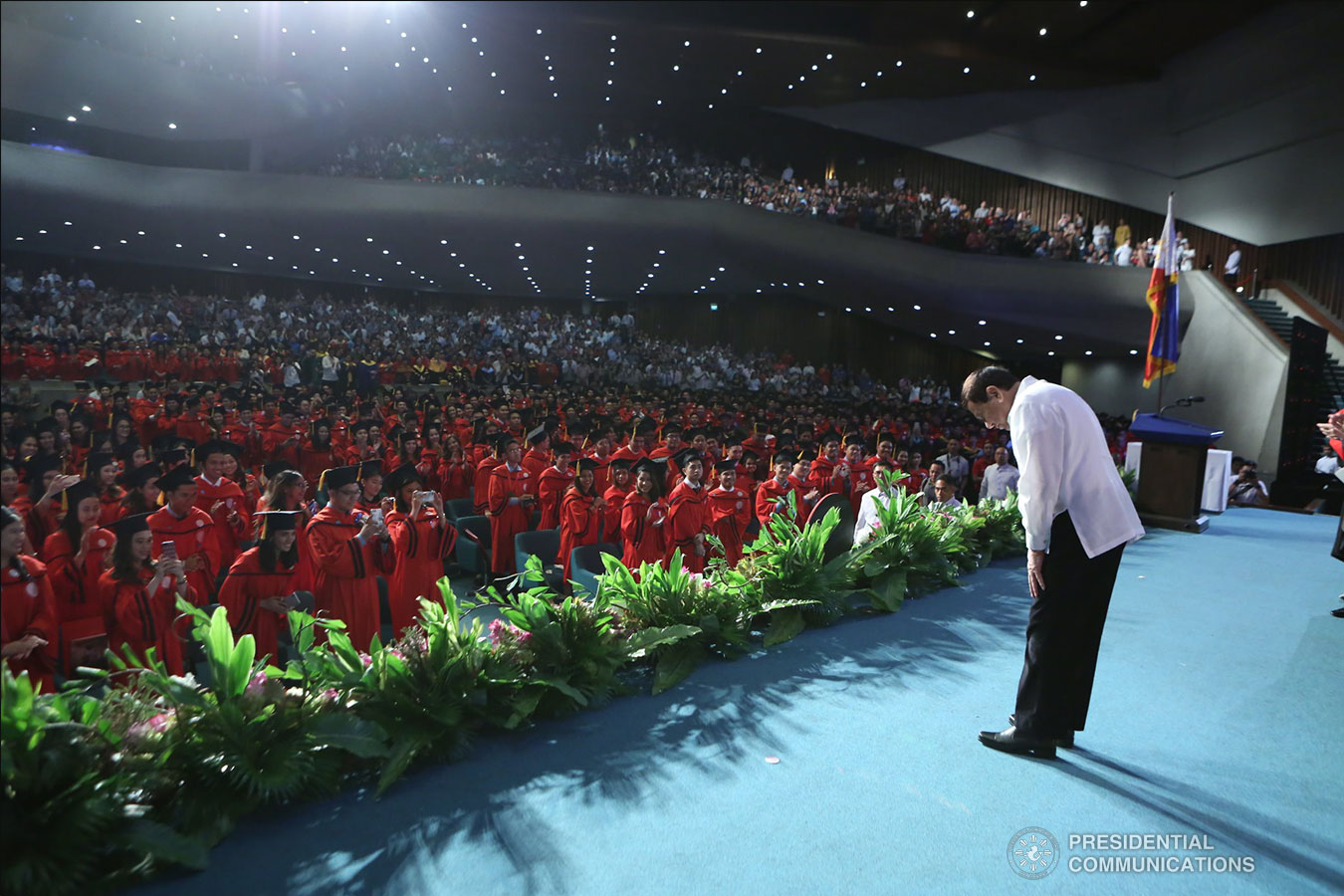
President Rodrigo Duterte during San Beda's 116th Commencement Exercises

San Beda University counts among its students, alumni and graduates numerous national leaders in politics, business, law, athletics, and entertainment such as the 16th Philippine President Rodrigo Duterte, Senator Leila de Lima, former senator Benigno S. Aquino Jr., former senator Raul S. Roco, former Speakers of the House of Representatives Ramon V. Mitra, former senator and human rights icon Rene Saguisag, former Supreme Court Chief Justice Roberto Concepcion, 14 Associate Justices including Florenz Regalado, business tycoon Dr. Manuel V. Pangilinan, Philippine basketball legend Carlos Loyzaga, actor Eddie Gutierrez, and 2004 Philippine presidential candidate & actor, Fernando Poe, Jr.

== See also ==
- San Beda Red Lions
- Fr. Bellarmine Baltasar Gymnasium
