= San Beda College Alabang =

Roman Catholic college in Muntinlupa, Philippines

- Dalubhasaang San Beda Alabang (Filipino)
- Former names: Benedictine Abbey School (1972–1995); St. Benedict College (1995–2004)
- Motto: Fides, Scientia, et Virtus (Latin)
- Motto in English: Faith, Knowledge, and Virtue
- Type: Private Roman Catholic Non-profit Coeducational Basic and Higher education institution
- Established: July 10, 1972; 54 years ago
- Founder: Order of Saint Benedict
- Parent institution: San Beda University
- Religious affiliation: Roman Catholic (Benedictine)
- Academic affiliations: PAASCU; BENET; CBCMMI; ICBE; FAAP
- Chancellor: Rt. Rev. Abbot Austin P. Cádiz, OSB
- Principal: Dr. Wilbert Auner B. Namoc, Ph.D. (K-12)
- Dean: Atty. Juan Ruffo D. Chong, JSD (College of Arts and Sciences); Ulpiano Sarmiento III, Ph.D. (School of Law); Andres Ignacio C.San Mateo, Jr. DBA. (Graduate School)
- Rector-President: Fr. Gerardo Ma. De Villa, OSB
- Students: 7,000+ (as of 2019-20)
- Location: 8 Don Manolo Blvd; Alabang Hills Village, Muntinlupa, Metro Manila, Philippines; 14°25′59″N 121°01′32″E
- Campus: Urban Cupang, Muntinlupa 11.2 hectares (112,000 m^{2})
- Colors: Red and White
- Nickname: Alabang Red Lions
- Sporting affiliations: NCAA South, WNCAA, MNCAA
- Mascot: Red Lion
- Website: www.sanbeda-alabang.edu.ph
- Location in Metro Manila Location in Luzon Location in the Philippines

San Beda College Alabang (Spanish: Colegio de San Beda de Alabang; Filipino: Dalubhasaang San Beda Alabang) is a private, Catholic basic and higher education institution run by the Benedictine monks in Cupang, Muntinlupa, Metro Manila, Philippines.

== History ==
=== Origin ===
Restiveness marked the late 1960s and the early 1970s, which led to the decision by the Benedictine monks to establish another campus outside Manila. They decided on Alabang in Muntinlupa as the site of the new campus. Construction of school buildings began in 1972 on a nine-and-a-half-hectare lot inside the Alabang Hills Village. On July 10, 1972, San Beda College Alabang opened its doors to 78 preschool boys and girls. It began as a basic co-educational school and was originally named the Benedictine Abbey School (BAS). Fr. Roberto de Jesus, OSB, who was the first Rector, supervised the growing years of the new institution. BAS opened its high school department in 1977.

Both elementary and high school departments later gained accreditation from the Philippine Accrediting Association of Schools, Colleges and Universities (PAASCU).

=== From Benedictine Abbey School to St. Benedict College ===
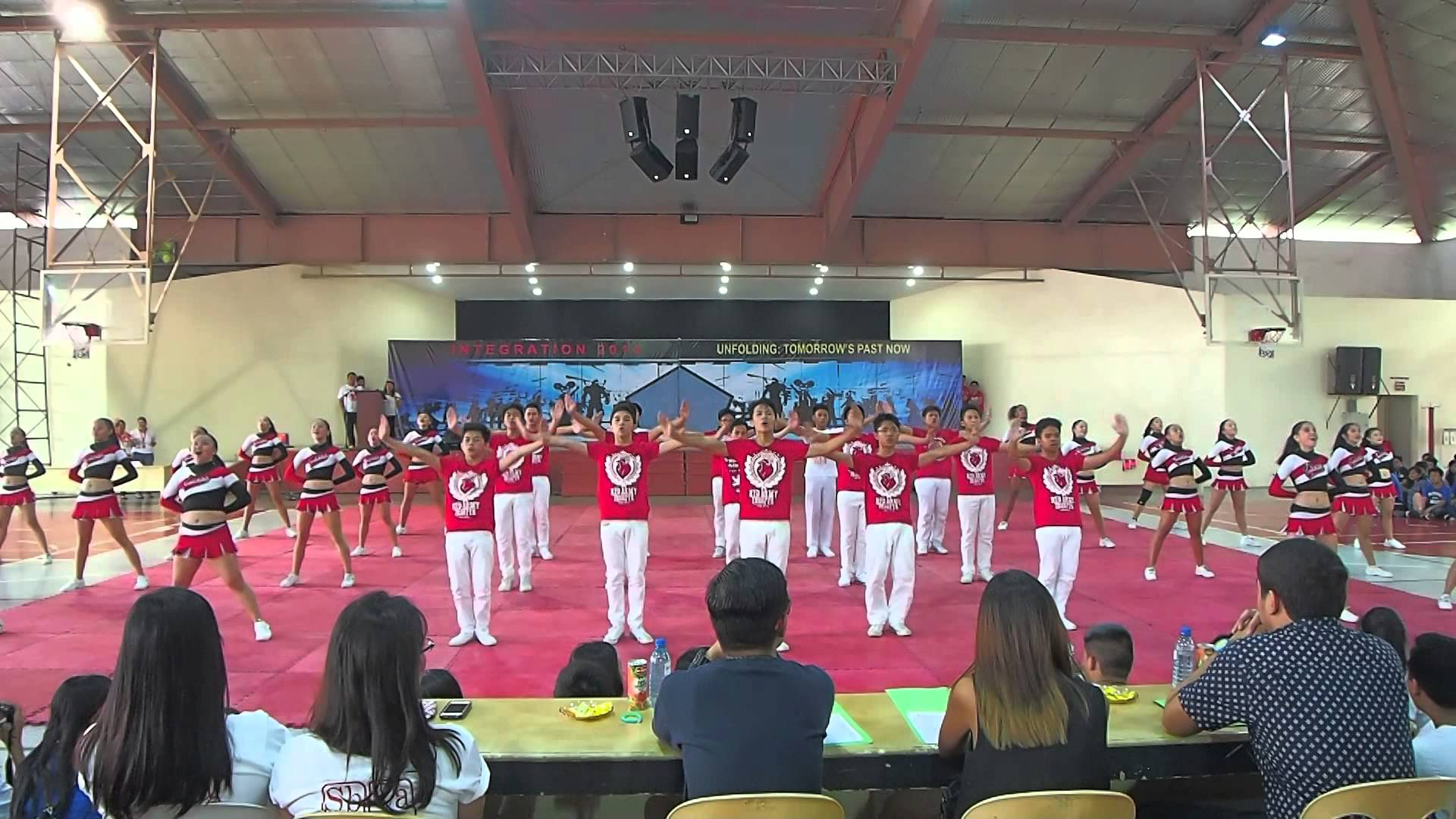
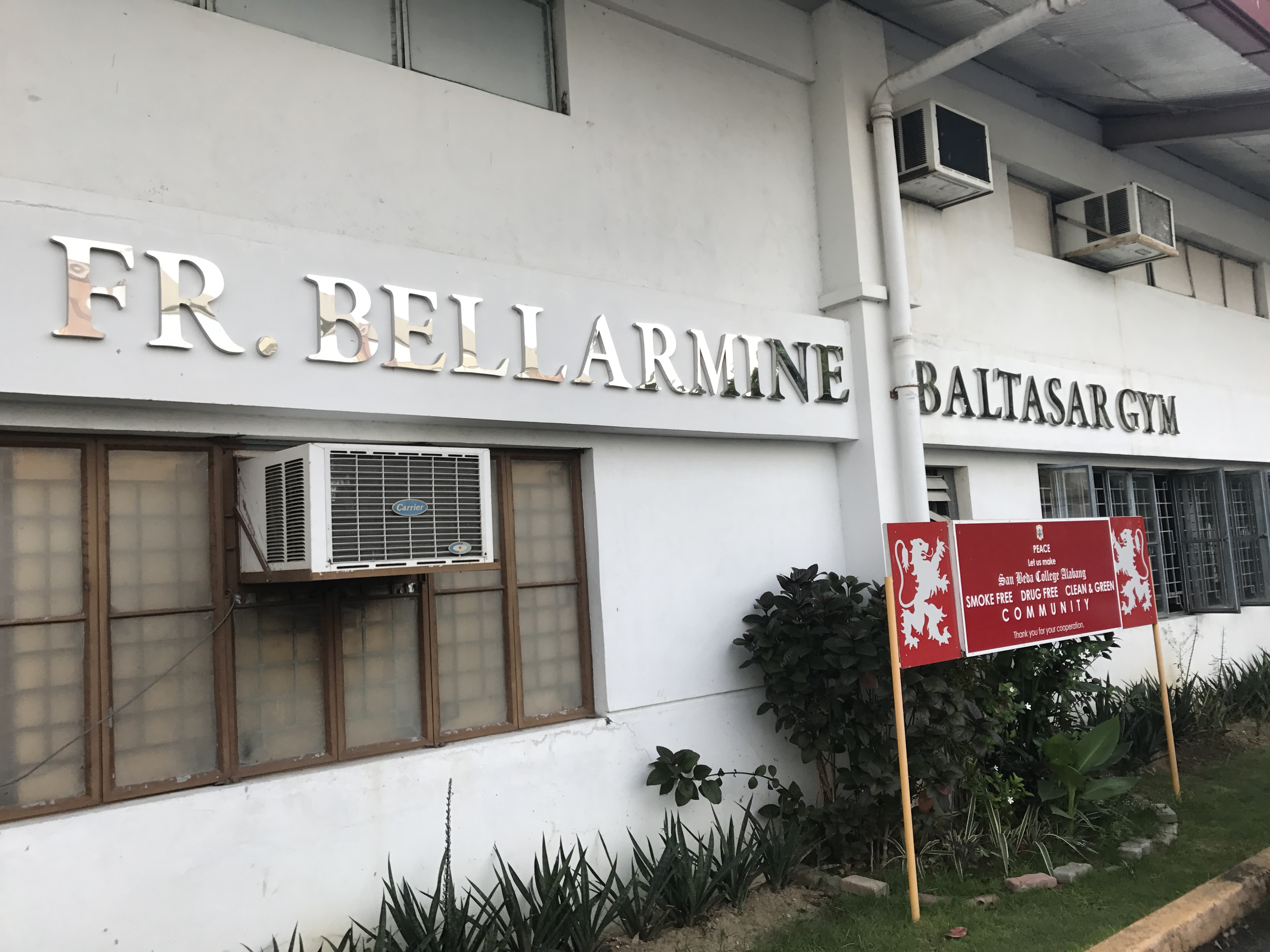
The Fr. Bellarmine Baltasar Gym initially opened in c. 1997. It was renamed in 2016 in honor of Fr. Baltasar, who is still to this day the longest presiding rector-president of the school.

Fr. Bellarmine R. Baltasar, OSB, who served as Rector for almost a decade, established the tertiary level which opened on the Benedictines' centennial anniversary in the Philippines. The school was renamed St. Benedict College on June 5, 1995. Along with this came the construction of the Fr. Bellarmine Baltasar Gym (then St. Benedict College Gym).

Under the leadership of Fr. Tarcisio H. Narciso, OSB, Rector, the college department initially offered mostly business-oriented courses. The department welcomed 208 students and 15 faculty members recruited from other colleges and universities and from the roster of the San Beda University high school and grade school faculty. In the succeeding years, the college opened additional courses that catered to the arts, humanities and other sciences. St. Bede Hall (the college building) was constructed in March 1996 and inaugurated on July 1, 1997, in time for the institution’s silver jubilee.

In 2001, Fr. Aloysius A. Maranan, OSB, Rector and concurrent Dean, renamed the college department the "College of Arts & Sciences." He focused on revitalizing the CAS through extensive operational and academic policies, curriculum adjustments, administrator overhauls and faculty development.

=== From St. Benedict College to San Beda College Alabang ===
- Rector - Presidents of San Beda College Alabang
- 1972–79 – Roberto De Jesus; 1979–80 – Silvestre H. Lacson; 1980–85 – Emmanuel R. Balcruz; 1985–95 – Bellarmine R. Baltasar; 1995–2001 – Tarcisio H. Narciso; 2001–04 – Aloysius A. Maranan; 2004–08 – Anscar J. Chupungco; 2008–13 – Dom Clement Ma. H. Roque; 2013-15 – Anselm M. Manalastas; 2015–19 – Dom Clement Ma. H. Roque; 2019–present – Gerardo Ma. A. De Villa

On September 7, 2004, after 32 years since its establishment, the school made the decision to adopt the secondary name of the institution as its official name; San Beda College Alabang. Fr. Anscar Chupungco, OSB, Rector-President led the decision in response to the growing demand of the institute's stakeholders.

Fr. Chupungco led the increase of higher education programs offered by the school. He opened a School of Law in 2005. However, the Law school was not an academic unit of The San Beda College as it was an extension of the School of Law of San Beda University Manila. Eventually in 2009, the Law School became part of San Beda College.

With the assumption of Dom Clement Ma. H. Roque, OSB as the eighth Rector-President in 2008 and his re-election in 2010, the school made efforts to have PAASCU accreditation. Construction of new facilities like the St. Maur Building for the School of Law were accomplished at the same time with the upgrading of sports facilities.

In 2013, Rev. Fr. Anselm M. Manalastas, OSB was installed as the ninth rector, which occurred after the passing of its seventh rector-president. On July 2, 2015, SBCA inaugurated its Graduate School with its initial offering of a degree leading to Master in Business Administration.

Responding to the government’s mandate of an expanded basic education program, the school began preparations for the transition to the new curriculum. A task force on the Senior High program was created by Rev. Fr. Anselm M. Manalastas, OSB in 2013. In April 2016, the Board of Trustees approved the establishment of the Senior High School (SHS) Department as a separate unit from the IBED (K-10) department. The move was in line with the strategy to position the SHS as a college preparatory program and align it with the course offerings of the CAS.

On May 14, 2016, together with the members of the Board of Trustees, Dom Clement Ma. H. Roque, OSB, Rector-President led the ground-breaking of the SHS building, which was named Our Lady of Montserrat Hall. The building was opened for occupancy on January 20, 2018.

In 2019, Fr. Gerardo Ma. A. De Villa, OSB was installed as the eleventh rector-president of San Beda College Alabang.

In 2022, the school decided to revamp its basic education program and shift from the traditional system by combining levels from its previous Primary Grade School and Middle Grade School to form Primary School (nursery, kinder to Grade 3), Middle Grade School and Junior High School to form Middle School (Grades 4 to 8), Junior High School and Senior High School to form High School (Grades 9 to 12).

The school then also launched its Technical High School for Grades 9 to 12 focused on Information and Communications Technology (ICT), Home Economics (HE), and Agri-Fishery Arts (AFA) in the same year. These changes all coincided with the institution's 50th anniversary jubilee.

== Academics ==
=== San Beda College Alabang School of Law ===
The San Beda School of Law in Alabang was established in 2004 and has been declared autonomous from the San Beda Law School in Mendiola, with lawyer Ulpiano P. Sarmiento III as its first dean. Among San Beda Alabang's faculty members are former Philippine senator Rene Saguisag, Rene Sarmiento, a former commissioner of the Philippines' Commission on Elections, and the lawyer brothers Sigfrid and Raymond Fortun.

=== Center for Performing Arts ===
San Beda College Alabang established the Center for Performing Arts in 2007. The center offers short courses in theatre, drama, acting, dance, and music.

== Notable alumni ==
- Ryan Agoncillo (GS, HS) - TV celebrity, host and actor
- Eric Altamirano (GS) - former basketball player and coach
- Rico Blanco (GS, HS) - former vocalist of Rivermaya
- Lino Cayetano (GS, HS) - Former Taguig City Mayor
- Lt. Gen. Roy M. Galido (GS '81, HS '85) - Commanding General, Philippine Army
- Enrique Gil (CAS) - actor, dancer, matinee idol, host
- Bianca King (GS, HS) - actress
- Edcel Greco Lagman (GS, HS) - Albay governor, lawyer, politician
- Joel Marciano Jr. (GS, HS) - Philippine Space Agency director-general, engineer
- Winwyn Marquez (CAS) - actress, model, dancer and beauty queen
- Ann Matibag (SOL), Member of the Philippine House of Representatives from Laguna's 1st District, former member of the Laguna Provincial board
- Abraham Mitra (GS, HS) - Games and Amusement Board chairman, politician
- Marlo Mortel (CAS) - model, singer, and actor
- A.G. Syjuco (CAS) - music producer, composer, and musician
- Phanie Teves (CAS) - Vice Mayor of Muntinlupa, former Councilor of Muntinlupa
