= Women's National Collegiate Athletic Association =

The Women's National Collegiate Athletic Association (WNCAA) is an athletic association in the Philippines exclusively for women. It was founded in 1970. Competition is divided into three divisions: Seniors for college students, Juniors for high school students, and Midgets for grade school and first year high school students. Its men's counterpart is the Men's National Collegiate Athletic Association, founded in 2004.

== Sports ==
- Basketball
- Volleyball
- Futsal
- Taekwondo
- Badminton
- Swimming
- Table Tennis
- Softball
- Cheerdance
- Track and Field

== Member schools ==
=== Metro Manila ===
- Angelicum College - Angelicum Tiger Cubs
- Assumption Antipolo - Assumption Amazons
- Assumption College San Lorenzo - AC Aces
- Benilde Antipolo - Benilde Antipolo Lady Blazers
- Centro Escolar University - CEU Scorpions
- Chiang Kai Shek College - CKSC Blue Dragons
- De La Salle Santiago Zobel School - DLSZ Lady Junior Archers
- La Salle College Antipolo - LSCA Voyagers
- Miriam College - Maria Katipuneras
- Philippine Women's University - PWU Patriots
- San Beda College Alabang - San Beda Alabang Red Lionesses
- St. Paul College Pasig - St. Paul Paulinians
- St. Scholastica's College - St. Scholastica's Scions
- Saint Jude Catholic School - St. Jude Judenites
- St. Stephen's High School - Stephenians
- University of Asia and the Pacific - UA&P Dragons
- University of Makati - UMak Herons
- UERMMMC College of Medicine - UERM Lady Warriors

On Leave

- De La Salle-College of Saint Benilde - DLS-CSB Saint Benilde Blazers
- Lyceum of the Philippines University - LPU Lady Pirates
- La Consolacion College - La Consolacion Blue Royals
- Emilio Aguinaldo College - EAC Generals
- Rizal Technological University - RTU Lady Thunder
- Saint Pedro Poveda College - Poveda Phoenix

Former members

- AMA Computer University - AMACU Titans
- Siena College of Quezon City - Siena Crimson Bravehearts
- Saint Francis of Assisi College System - St. Francis Lady Doves (Failed the requirements of WNCAA)
- World Citi Colleges - WCC Vikings

=== Cordillera Administrative Region ===
- Baguio Central University BCU Lady Eagles
- Baguio Colleges Foundation BCF
- Benguet State University BSU
- Cordillera Career Development College CCDC Lady Admirals
- Pines City College PCC
- STI Colleges, Baguio STI Olympians
- St. Louis University (Baguio) SLU Lady Navigators
- University of Baguio UB Lady Cardinals
- University of the Cordilleras UC Lady Jaguars
- University of the Philippines Baguio UPB Lady Fighting Maroons

=== Central Luzon ===
- Bulacan State University BulSU Lady Gold Gears
- Holy Angel University Lady Flyers
- Lyceum of Subic Bay Sharks
- St. Scholastica's Academy - San Fernando
- Tarlac State University Lady Tigers
- University of the Assumption UA Lady Blue Pelicans

=== CALABARZON ===
- Batangas State University BatSU
- Cavite State University CavSU Lady Hornets
- De La Salle Lipa DLSL Lady Chevrons
- Laguna College of Business and Arts LCBA Lady Lycans
- University of Perpetual Help System Laguna UPHSL Saints
- University of the Philippines Los Baños UPLB Lady Fighting Maroons

=== Bicol Region ===
- University of Santo Tomas–Legazpi, Legazpi City, USTL Lady Phoenix
- Ateneo de Naga University ADNU Lady Golden Knights
- Bicol University, Legazpi City, BU
- Divine Word College of Legazpi DWCL
- Universidad de Sta. Isabel, Naga City, USI Vicentians
- University of Nueva Caceres UNC Greyhounds

=== Visayas ===
- Colegio de Sta. Catalina de Alexandria COSCA
- Foundation University FU Lady Greywolves
- Holy Name University HNU Lady Falcons
- Negros Oriental State University NORSU Lady Tigers
- Silliman University SU Mares
- St. Paul University Dumaguete SPUD Saints
