= Fr. Bellarmine Baltasar Gymnasium =

College gymnasium in Muntinlupa, Philippines

Fr. Bellarmine Baltasar Gym
- San Beda College Alabang Gym
- Interactive map of Fr. Bellarmine Baltasar Gym
- Former names: St. Benedict College Gym; San Beda College Alabang Gym
- Location: 8 Don Manolo Blvd., Alabang Hills Village, Alabang, Muntinlupa, Philippines
- Coordinates: 14°25′56″N 121°01′29″E
- Owner: San Beda College Alabang
- Operator: San Beda College Alabang
- Capacity: Seated: 1,200; Full house: 5,560

Construction
- Opened: 1997

Tenants
- San Beda College Alabang Red Lions; NCAA South (2002–present); WNCAA (2004–present); MNCAA (2004–present)

The Fr. Bellarmine Baltasar Gymnasium (also known as the San Beda College Alabang Gym) is a gymnasium within San Beda College Alabang in Muntinlupa, Philippines. It has a seating capacity of 1,200 for sporting events and a full house capacity of 5,560.

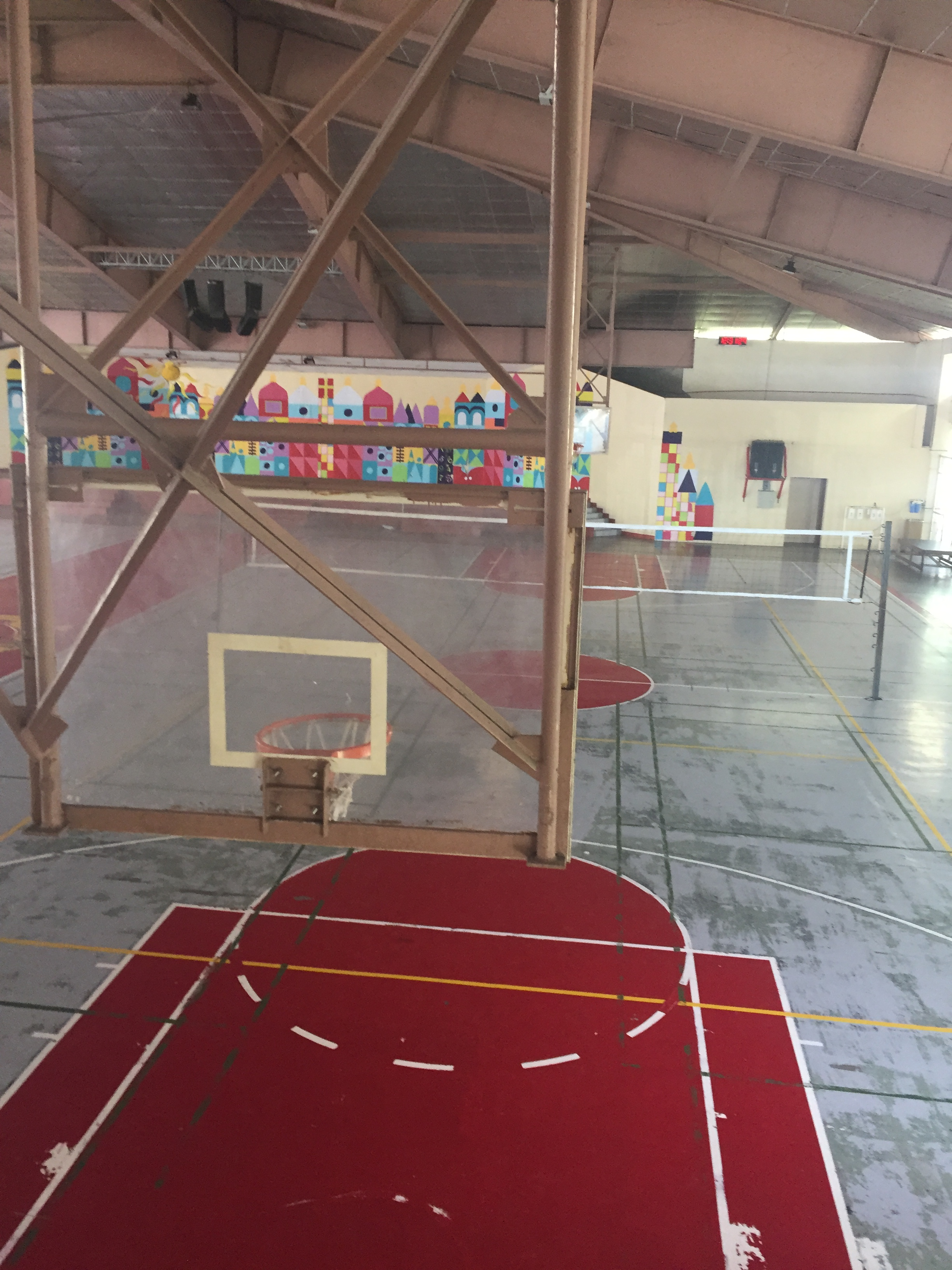
Overlooking the gymnasium, 2016

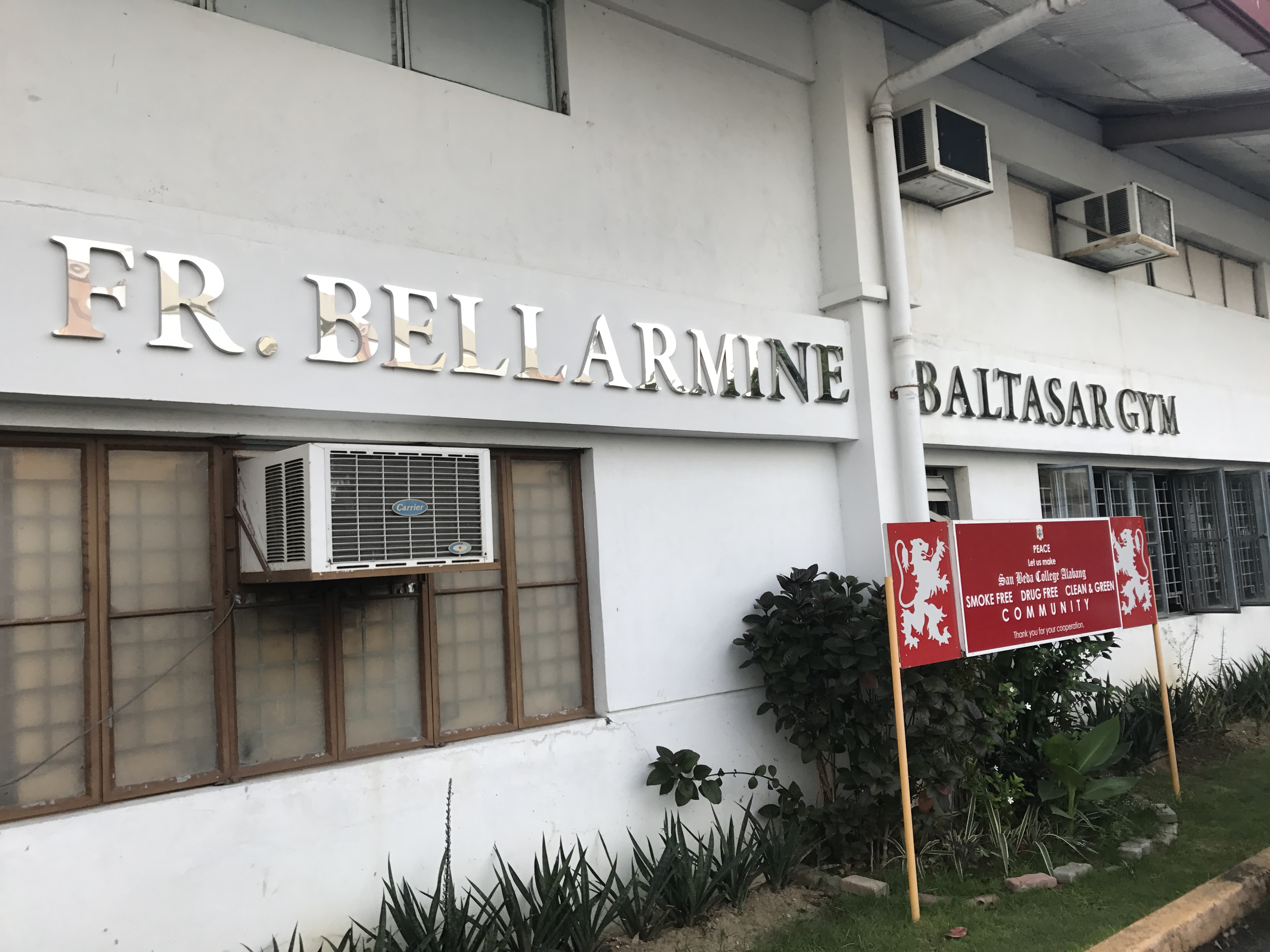
Facade of the gymnasium, 2017

Within the gymnasium are two full-sized basketball courts, volleyball courts and an event stage. It is also the location of the school's athletic offices. With the assumption of Dom Clement Ma. H. Roque, OSB as the eighth rector-president, the gymnasium was renovated. During the 2015–16 school year, the San Beda College Alabang Gym was officially renamed in honor of the school's fourth rector-president, Fr. Bellarmine Baltasar, OSB, who was the rector-president of the school from 1985 to 1995.

The gymnasium underwent its first major renovation in 2019 under the leadership of Rev. Fr. Gerardo Ma. De Villa, OSB, in preparation for the school's hosting of the NCAA South Season 21.

== Events ==
=== Sporting events ===
Frequently a venue for sporting events of the National Collegiate Athletic Association (South) and the Women's National Collegiate Athletic Association, Men's National Collegiate Athletic Association and is the home of the San Beda College Alabang Red Lions, San Beda College Alabang's varsity teams. Coach Eric Altamirano's basketball clinic has been doing its program here since 2012, and the Complete Basketball Camp in 2014.

=== Other uses ===
It is the main athletics academic facility, used for most in-school events, including non-athletic ones. This includes Moving Up Ceremonies, Cultural Event Shows, Integration, the famous Batch Cheering, and other inter-school activities. The school's annual Bodega Sale was held here until 2015 when their Baratillo Sale replaced it from 2016 onwards.

In 2015, the gym hosted practices and preparations for Pope Francis's visit to the Philippines with students coming from different schools within the Diocese of Paranaque.

On September 2, 2016, the Motorcycle Development Program Participants Association (MDPPA) held road safety advocacy activities here.

The gymnasium has been regularly used as a polling station since the 2010 Philippine presidential elections.

== See also ==
- List of indoor arenas in the Philippines
