= Anselmianum =

Pontifical university in Rome, Italy

Coordinates: 41°52′59″N 12°28′44″E

The Anselmianum, officially the Pontifical Athenaeum of Saint Anselm (Italian: Pontificio Ateneo Sant'Anselmo; Latin: Pontificium Athenaeum Anselmianum) and also known simply as Sant'Anselmo, is a pontifical university in Rome associated with the Benedictines. It offers courses in philosophy, theology, liturgy, monastic studies, languages, sacramental theology, and the history of theology.

The Pontifical Liturgical Institute in Rome promotes the study of the Sacred Liturgy. It is entrusted to the Benedictine Confederation, and has the role of training professors of liturgy and liturgical experts to advance the study and teaching of the Church's liturgy in the various parts of the world. Almost all of the courses are taught through the medium of the Italian language. Exceptionally, courses are offered in French, German, Spanish, Portuguese or English. There have been many alumni:

== History ==
The university was founded in its present form by Pope Leo XIII in 1887, created in honor of St. Anselm of Canterbury. It is located at the Sant'Anselmo all'Aventino complex in the Piazza Cavalieri di Malta Square on the Aventine Hill in Ripa, Rome. An additional Pontifical Institute of Sacred Liturgy was canonically established by the Holy See as a faculty of Sacred Liturgy in order to promote liturgical science through research and teaching. As such it is empowered to grant, in the name of the Pope, the unique academic degrees of License (SL.L.) and Doctorate (SL.D.) in Sacred Liturgy.

== English language programme ==
Ever since the 1990s, successive presidi (deans) of the PIL have tried to establish English-language programmes of PIL courses in the US in order to provide access for English and Spanish-speaking students. First Prof. Cassian Folsom O.S.B approached the University of Chicago, and later Prof Juan Javier Flores Arcas O.S.B. approached the St Thomas University, Miami, but these have not yet borne fruit. Similarly, further attempts to initiate an English-language liturgy summer school at Sant’Anselmo in Rome have not yet matured.

At the behest of the Dean of the PIL in 2009, the board of the Institutum Liturgicum in Anglia et Cambria requested the Faculty of Theology and Religious Studies of the Catholic University of Leuven to give validation to the Pontifical Institute of Liturgy courses, now taught in Italian in Rome. The request was granted and these courses have been offered in English at the Benedictine Institute, Ealing Abbey in London as a "feeder" programme of studies for the Pontifical Institute of Liturgy since 2011.

The Council of the Preside endorsed the Publishing Project "Documenta Rerum Ecclesiasticarum Instaurata", directors, Fr James Leachman, O.S.B. A monk of St. Benedict's Abbey, Ealing, London; doctor of sacred liturgy, Pontifical Institute of Liturgy, Sant’Anselmo, Rome Principal of Benedictine Study and Arts Centre, Ealing Abbey Co-director of project Appreciating the Liturgy and co-founder of the Institutum liturgicum and Daniel McCarthy OSB in March 2008.

On Thursday 12 November 2009 the Council of the Preside of the Pontifical Institute of Liturgy accepted the proposal of the board of the "Institutum Liturgicum in Anglia et Cambria" to organise the teaching of some PIL courses in the UK, beginning Summer 2011 for a period of five years. The Preside, Fr Ephrem Carr recommended that courses be additionally accredited at a different Pontifical University.

== Leadership ==
The chancellor (gran cancelliere) of the Anselmianum is the Abbot Primate of the Benedictine Confederation. Abbot Primate Jeremias Schröder was elected on Sept. 14, 2024.

The rector (rettore magnifico) of the Anselmianum is Jákó Örs Fehérváry, O.S.B., a Benedictine monk of Pannonhalma Archabbey in Hungary.

The president of the Pontifical Institute of Sacred Liturgy (Preside del Pontificio Istituto Liturgico) is Stefan Geiger, O.S.B., a Benedictine monk of Schäftlarn Abbey in Germany.

== Activities ==
The University's library was established with gifts from various Benedictine congregations and the personal collections of Cardinal Dusmet Gaetano Bernardino, and has since grown to become a substantial source of theological research material. The librarian is Brother Joseph Schneeweis, O.S.B., a Benedictine monk of Saint John's Abbey, Collegeville.

== Notable graduates ==
- Anscar Chupungco – Benedictine monk
- Stanley Jaki – Benedictine monk
- Brian V. Johnstone – Redemptorist priest
- Wilton Gregory – Cardinal, Archbishop Emeritus of Washington
- Erik Varden – Trappist monk and Bishop-Prelate of the Roman Catholic Territorial Prelature of Trondheim
- Christopher J. Coyne – Bishop of Burlington
- Charles John Brown – Apostolic Nuncio to the Philippines
- Paul Augustin Mayer - Cardinal Prefect Emeritus of the Congregation for Divine Worship and the Discipline of the Sacraments
- Piero Marini - President of the Pontifical Committee for International Eucharistic Congresses
- Hernaldo Pinto Farias - Bishop of Bonfim
- Magnus Löhrer - Benedictine monk
- Basil Studer - Benedictine monk
- Adalbert de Vogüé - Benedictine monk
- Jean Leclercq - Benedictine monk
- Anselm Stolz - Benedictine monk
- Cipriano Vagaggini - Benedictine monk
- Salvatore Marsili - Benedictine monk
- Ioan Casian Tunaru - Romanian Orthodox Church Bishop of Canada
- Diego Giovanni Ravelli, Master of Pontifical Liturgical Celebrations

From the Pontifical Liturgical Institute:

- Archbishop Wilton D. Gregory
- Archbishop Leo W. Cushley
- Bishop Christopher J. Coyne
- Bishop Hernaldo Pinto Farias, S.S.S 17 July 2019, diocese of Bonfim, Bahia in the Archdiocese of Feira de Santana, Brasil.
- Fr. Anscar Chupungco, O.S.B.
- Fr. Marcel Rooney, O.S.B.
