= Ecclesia orans =

Academic journal on Christian liturgy

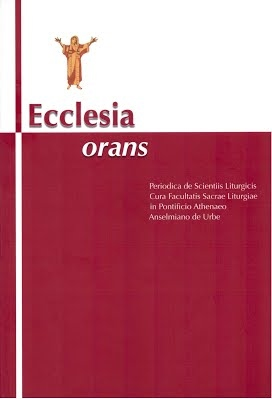
The cover of Ecclesia orans

Ecclesia orans: Periodica de Scientiis Liturgicis is a peer-reviewed academic journal on all aspects of Christian liturgy published by the Pontifical Institute of Sacred Liturgy of Sant'Anselmo all'Aventino.

The journal was established in 1984 by Adrien Nocent and Anscar Chupungco and appeared triannually. Some sources identify an earlier publication of the same name published at the Maria Laach Abbey in 1918. It was the second in a two-part series, which provided a rereading of the sources of the liturgical tradition from historical, theological, and pastoral perspectives.

Since 2013, Ecclesia orans has been published biannually. The editor-in-chief is Markus Tymister (Pontifical Atheneum of St. Anselm). Articles are published in English, French, German, Italian, Portuguese, and Spanish.

== Editors-in-chief ==
The following persons are or have been editors-in chief:

- Adrien Nocent OSB (1984-1996)
- Anscar Chupungco OSB (1997)
- Cassian Folsom OSB (1997-1998)
- Ephrem Carr OSB (1999-2012)
- Pietro Angelo Muroni (2012–2018)
- Markus Tymister (2018–present)

== Abstracting and indexing ==
The journal is abstracted and indexed in the ATLA Religion Database and in 2012 and 2014 in Scopus.
