= La Salle College Antipolo =

Roman Catholic college in Rizal, Philippines

- Dalubhasaang La Salle Antipolo (Filipino)
- Former name: La Salle School Antipolo (1985–1998)
- Motto: Fides Servitium Committere (Latin)
- Motto in English: Faith Service Communion
- Type: Private, Catholic, co-educational basic education institution
- Established: 1985; 41 years ago
- Founders: Br Rolando Dizon FSC; Br. Francis Cody, FSC
- Religious affiliation: Roman Catholic (Christian Brothers)
- Academic affiliations: PAASCU DLSP
- President: Jimelo S. Tipay
- Principal: Dennis Angelo E. Mejia
- Administrative staff: 148
- Students: 1,872
- Location: 1985 La Salle Avenue, Town & Country Hghts Subd. Brgy. San Luis, Antipolo City, Rizal, Philippines; 14°36′12″N 121°12′19″E
- Alma Mater song: De La Salle Alma Mater Hymn
- Patron saint: St. Jean-Baptiste de La Salle
- Colors: Green and White
- Nickname: Green Voyagers
- Sporting affiliations: WNCAA, MNCAA
- Mascot: Voyager
- Website: www.lsca.edu.ph
- Location in Luzon Location in the Philippines

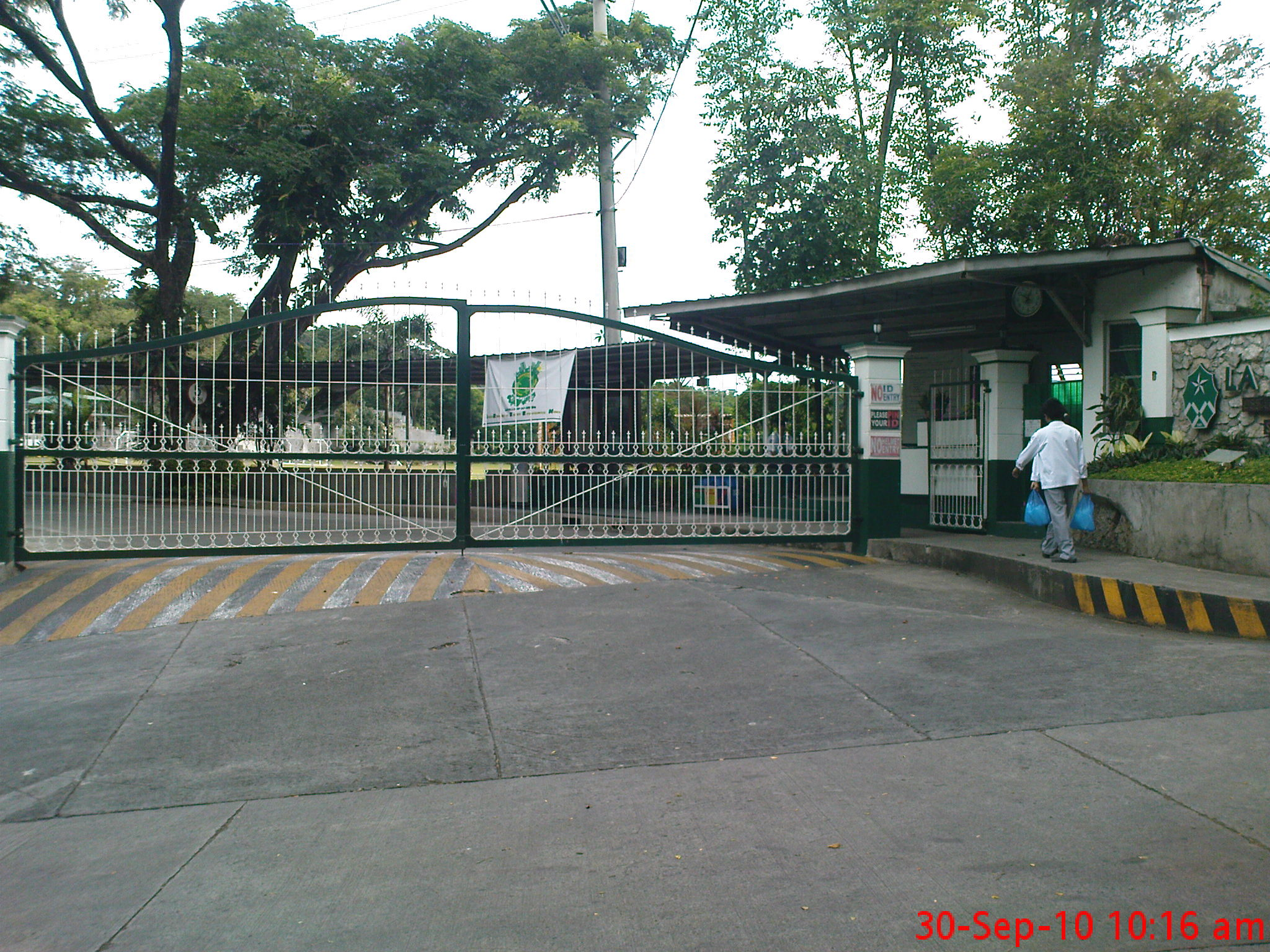
Entrance gate

La Salle College Antipolo, or La Salle Antipolo, is a Catholic Lasallian educational institution in Antipolo, Rizal, Philippines, was founded as a La Salle School by Rolando Dizon, a past president of De La Salle University, Manila, in 1986.

== History ==
The construction of the school began on March 16, 1985. During this time, kindergarten to fourth grade classes were temporarily held first at La Salle Green Hills. Construction was delayed because of the costs and logistics that were involved in building a school on a mountain.

Classes were finally transferred to the Antipolo campus on January 13, 1986, and were housed in two buildings. A third building was completed in the summer of 1987, with a fourth one completed in 1989. The school's St. Benilde Multi-purpose Hall was finished in 1991, while the high school and laboratory-library buildings were completed in 1994.

The Tertiary Education Unit was launched in 1998, with BS in elementary education and BS in accountancy offered initially.

In 2006, La Salle College became part of De La Salle Philippines, Inc.

In 2014, De La Salle–College of Saint Benilde acquired a building in the city proper for the Tertiary Education Unit of La Salle College Antipolo.

La Salle College was 30 years old in 2016. The senior high school also opened during this year.

In 2018, the Tertiary Education unit of La Salle College Antipolo merged with De La Salle-College of Saint Benilde following Benilde's construction of a multistorey building in the city proper of Antipolo. The campus is called DLS-CSB - Antipolo. With the college department spun off, La Salle College Antipolo focused on providing basic education from kindergarten to senior high school.

In 2019, LSCA opened the preschool campus at the town proper of Antipolo offering Nursery 1, Nursery 2, and Kindergarten. The campus is situated on Sen. L. Sumulong Street in San Jose, Antipolo.

== Academics ==
LSCA offers preschool to senior high school programs.

Senior high school program:

- Academic track: STEM, ABM, HUMSS, ADT, ICT
- Technical vocational livelihood track: Food processing

== Sports ==
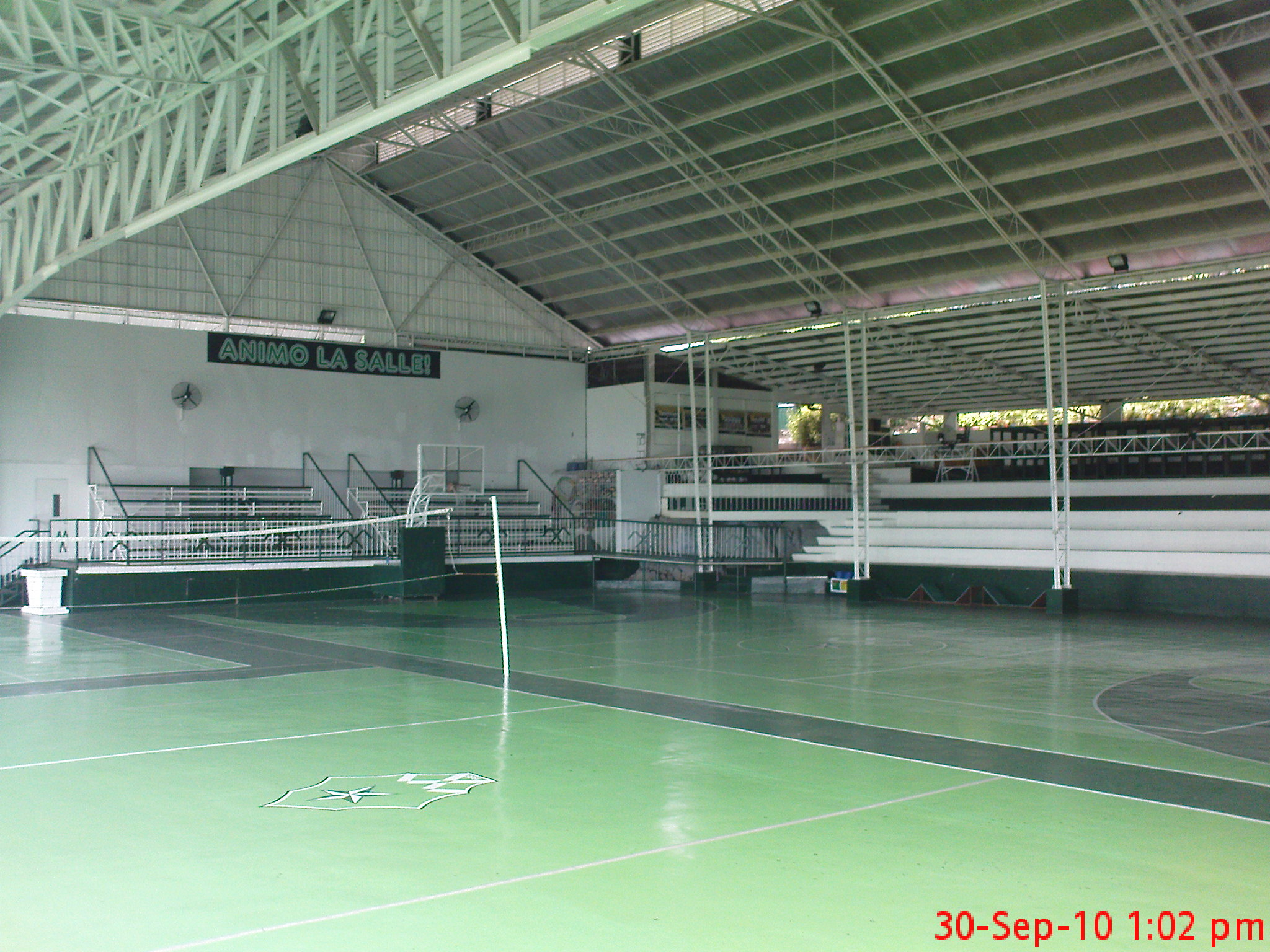
Gymnasium of La Salle College

La Salle College Antipolo's sports teams are called Voyagers. The official colors are green and white. The school has varsity teams for the sports of basketball, volleyball, baseball, football, handball, taekwondo, badminton and table tennis.

- The sports programs captured back-to-back WNCAA titles for badminton junior's division in 2006–2008. The grade school boys' football team won the DLSZ Football Fiesta championship (boys 13 division) in 2007. The team also took home the championship in the 2007 CALABARZON regional championship.
- The taekwondo, volleyball, futsal and girls' basketball teams won second runner-up finishes in the 38th season of the WNCAA. The table tennis team took home the first runner-up title of the WNCAA in 2006.
- The badminton team also took home championships in Toby's and Yonex badminton tourneys.
