= Maryhill School of Theology =

Private school in Quezon City, Philippines

- Type: Postgraduate Theological Studies
- Established: 1972 (53 years ago)
- President: Rev. Fr. Ramon Caluza, CICM
- Dean: Rev. Fr. Richard Diaz, CICM
- Location: Quezon City, Philippines; 14°37′22″N 121°01′44″E
- Website: maryhillschooloftheology.com

Maryhill School of Theology (MST) is an institute for theological studies.

== Relationship with CICM ==
The Philippine Province of the Congregation of the Immaculate Heart of Mary (CICM, from the Latin Congregatio Immaculati Cordis Mariae) established Maryhill School of Theology in 1972. Moreover, the Board of Trustees of the CICM Mission Seminaries, Inc. directs and supervises MST as a non-stock, non-profit educational entity. Maryhill has been accepted by the Provinces of the CICM Asian Region as a Regional School of Theology since 1989.

== Founders ==
- Rev. Fr. Paul Van Parijs, C.I.C.M.
- Dom Anscar Chupungco, O.S.B.
- Rev. Fr. Eugene Flameygh, C.I.C.M.
- Rev. Fr. Herman Hendrickx, C.I.C.M.
- Rev. Fr. Paul Staes, C.I.C.M.
- Rev. Fr. Lode Wostyn, C.I.C.M.

== Student body ==
- laypersons
- professed religious
- diocesan priests
- seminarians

== Graduate programs ==
The Philippine education bureau has approved Maryhill's Graduate School Program in 1977 and authorized the institute to bestow the academic degree of Master of Arts in Theology. However, from the school's inception, candidates to the priesthood were provided with a four-year training in theology on a non-degree basis.

=== General Theology Program (GTP) ===
The GTP track is designed for full-time students such as seminarians, religious, and laypersons. It is guided by the norms of the Sacred Congregation for Catholic Education and the Episcopal Commission on Seminaries for Priestly Formation. The two available areas of specialization include:

- Master of Arts in Theological Studies (MATS)
- Master in Pastoral Ministry (MPM)

=== Adult Theological Education Program (ATEP) ===
The ATEP track offers continuing education in theology to priests, religious, and laypersons for their personal development (audit basis) or for coursework required in a master's degree. The two available areas of specialization include:

- Master of Arts in Religious Studies (MARS)
- Master of Arts, Major in Pastoral Ministry (MAPM)
