= Ecclesiastes (disambiguation) =

Ecclesiastes is a book of the Hebrew Bible. It may also refer to:

- Ecclesiastes of Erasmus, or Ecclesiastes: On the Art of Preaching, by Desiderius Erasmus, published 1535
- Ecclesiastes Rabbah, an aggadic commentary on Ecclesiastes, included in the collection of the Midrash Rabbah.
- "Ecclesiastes", a track on Stevie Wonder's Journey Through "The Secret Life of Plants" (1979 album).

== Similar spellings ==
- Eccles (disambiguation)
- Ecclesia (disambiguation)
- Ecclesiast, member of the Clergy
- Wisdom of Sirach (or Ecclesiasticus), apocryphal book of the Septuagint
