= Anselm Stolz =

German Benedictine theologian (1900–1942)

Anselm Stolz (November 25, 1900 – September 19, 1942) was a Benedictine monk, theologian, and professor.

== Biography ==
He entered Gerleve Abbey and made solemn profession on February 29, 1920. He attended the Pontifical Athenaeum of Saint Anselm beginning in 1921; he taught Systematic Theology there beginning in 1928. He spoke frequently at Catholic conferences such as the Hochschulwochen in Salzburg in 1937. He died in Rome in 1942, after contracting typhoid fever while caring for the sick.

== Reception ==
Several theologians have identified his work as an important example of rediscovered, "authentically Christian mysticism." When Sant' Anselmo celebrated its centennial anniversary, the Faculty of Theology held a symposium in honor of Stolz, who was described as "one of its most famous lecturers" in the published proceedings.

== Christian Ascetism ==
His first publication on ascetism appeared in 1936, but it was the 1943 book on Christian spirituality that had long-standing success. It has been translated into the three languages over the course of eighty years. His references were primarily Church Fathers and the Rule of St. Benedict, occasionally referencing Thomas Aquinas. His approach was unusual in an era which had not yet re-discovered patristic sources.

== Selected publications ==
- Glaubensgnade und Glaubenslicht nach Thomas von Aquin. Rom 1933, OCLC 6948545.
- Theologie der Mystik. Regensburg 1936, OCLC 759813891.
  - Translated as The Doctrine of Spiritual Perfection, by Aidan Williams, 1938.
  - Translated as La scala del paradiso. Teologia della mistica, Brescia 1979 (3rd edition).
- Anselm von Canterbury. Sein Leben, seine Bedeutung, seine Hauptwerke. München 1937, OCLC 256319534.
- L’ascesi cristiana. Brescia 1943, OCLC 1020136226.
  - Translated as L'ascèse chrétienne. Éditions des Bénédictins d'Amay, Chevetogne 1948.
  - Translated as Christian Asceticism. Arouca Press, 2021, ISBN 978-1-989905-71-5.

== Literature ==
- Entry (with photograph) in Regesta Ecclesiastica Salisburgensia.
- Elmar Salmann: Gnadenerfahrung im Gebet. Zur Theorie der Mystik bei Anselm Stolz und Alois Mager. 1979, OCLC 784054283.
- Elmar Salmann, ed.: La teologia mistico-sapienziale di Anselm Stolz. Rom 1988, OCLC 186184551.
- Fabio Angelo Bressan: Lo sfondo mistico della teologia. La lezione breve di Anselm Stolz Padua. Padua 2004, ISBN 88-250-1200-4.
- Pius Engelbert: Sant'Anselmo in Rome. College and University. From the Beginnings to the Present Day. Collegeville 2015, S. 146–154, ISBN 9780814637135.
