= Adrien Nocent =

Belgian monk and theologian (1913–1996)

Adrien Nocent, OSB (2 February 1913 – 9 December 1996) was a Belgian monk and liturgical theologian.

== Biography ==
Nocent was born in Charleroi and entered Maredsous Abbey at the age of 19, making solemn vows in 1933. He was ordained as a priest in 1938. He studied theology at Keizersberg Abbey (French Mont César) near Leuven, Belgium, where the Liturgical Movement began. Among his teachers were Bernard Capelle (1884–1961) and Bernard Botte (1893–1980).

Nocent entered military service before his ordination and later during the Second World War when he served in a military hospital and later a military chaplain.

Beginning in 1952, Nocent lectured at the Centre international Lumen Vitae in Brussels. He continued his studies at Louvain University and in Paris at the École pratique des hautes études. He finished his degree there in 1959 with a thesis under the direction of Gabriel Le Bras (1891–1970) and titled Un Fragment de sacramentaire de Sens au Xe siècle. La liturgie baptismale de la province ecclésiastique de Sens dans les manuscrits du IXe au XVIe siècles. He then went to Rome to teach at the Pontifical Atheneum of St. Anselm. Together with Salvatore Marsili (1910–1983) Cipriano Vaggagini (1909–1999), and Emmanuel Lane, he founded the Pontifical Liturgical Institute.

Nocent became a consultant to the Second Vatican Council in 1964 and in 1969, consultant to the Congregation for Divine Worship. As of 1984, he served as the first editor of the liturgical periodical Ecclesia orans. For decades, Nocent was a sought-after speaker on the topic of post-conciliar liturgical reform. He spoke in Italy, Canada, the United States, Cameroon, Senegal and Togo. Many bishops considered him to be an eminent specialist in his field.

Nocent was an amateur violinist and Vice President of the Arthur Grumiaux Foundation.

== Books ==
- Contempler sa gloire. 3 vols. Paris 1960–1965.
  - (German) Das heilige Jahr. 3 vols. Stuttgart 1965–1966.
  - (Italian) Contemplare la sua gloria. 3 vols. Brescia 1964–1966.
- L‘avenir de la liturgie. Paris 1961.
  - (Dutch) De toekomst van de liturgie. Roermond 1963.
  - (Spanish) El porvenir de la liturgia. Barcelona 1963.
  - (English) The Future of the Liturgy. Montreal 1964.
- (with Marc Mélot) On nous change la messe. Brüssel 1965.
- (with Jacques Deretz) Synopse des textes conciliaires. Paris 1966
  - (Italian) Dizionario dei testi conciliari. Brescia 1967.
  - (English) Dictionary of the Council. London 1968.
  - (German) Konkordanz der Konzilstexte. Graz 1968.
- Célébrer Jésus-Christ. L’année liturgique. 7 vols. Paris 1975–1977.
  - (English) The Liturgical Year. 4 vols. Liturgical Press, Collegeville, Minnesota 1977. Hrsg. von Paul Turner. 3 Bde. Ebenda 2013.
  - (Spanish) El año litúrgico. Celebrar a Jesucristo. 7 Bde. Santander 1977.
  - (Italian) Celebrare Gesù Cristo. 4 Bde. Assisi 1977.
- La liturgia. I sacramenti. Teologia e storia della celebrazione. Genua 1986.
- Le renouveau liturgique. Une relecture. Beauchesne, Paris 1993.
  - (English) A Rereading of the Renewed Liturgy. Collegeville, Minnesota 1994.
  - (Italian) Liturgia semper reformanda. Rilettura della riforma liturgica. Magnano 1993.

== Secondary literature ==
=== Festschrift ===
- Traditio et Progressio. Studi liturgici in onore del Adrien Nocent, OSB. Rome 1988 (Studia Anselmiana. Analecta liturgica 12) (with Nocent's publications for the period 1955–1987).

=== Obituaries and bibliographies ===
- Paul De Clerk: "La carrière et l'oeuvre de liturgiste de Dom Adrien Nocent 1913–1996". In: Lettre de Maredsous 26, 1997, 2, p. 77–80.
- "In memoriam. Dom Adrien Nocent, O.S.B. (1913–1996)". In: Ecclesia orans 14, 1997, p. 7–13.
- Franciszek Małaczyński: "Śp. o. Adrien Nocent OSB (1913–1996)" In: Ruch Biblijny i Liturgiczny 50, 1997, p. 308–309.
- Basilio Rizzi: "Bibliografia di Adrien Maurice Nocent OSB (2.2.1913–9.12.1996)". In: Ecclesia orans 14, 1997, p. 439–449.

=== Further reading ===
- Anscar Chupungco: "The Pontifical Liturgical Institute. A Benedictine service to the Church". In: Gerardo J. Békés (Hrsg.): Sant'Anselmo. Saggi storici e di attualità. Rom 1988, p. 193–225.
- Pius Engelbert: Sant'Anselmo in Rome. College and University. From the Beginnings to the Present Day. Collegeville, Minnesota, 2015, p. 260–263.
