= Japan Ecclesia of Christ =

The Japan Ecclesia of Christ (日本キリスト召団, Nihon Kirisuto Shōdan) is an independent Japanese church that was founded by Koike Tasuo (小池辰雄) in 1940. Koike Tatsuo was born in 1904 and educated in Tokyo Imperial University. He became attracted to Christianity as a young man as a result of attending the Bible lectures of Uchimura Kanzō, the well-known founder of the Nonchurch movement. After his conversion, he attended a Nonchurch Bible study group led by Takeshi Fujii, one of Uchimura's disciples, for a period of five years (1925–1930). in 1940 Koike established his own independent Bible study group based on the Nonchurch tradition. Over the next twelve decades, Koike's circle of influence widened and he eventually organized twelve groups around the country.

Although rooted in the Nonchurch movement, Koike became very critical of Uchimura and the "narrow intellectualism" of his disciples. He argued that both transplanted churches and nonchurch Christianity were too conceptual in orientation. What people need is life, not just abstract teaching. This interpretation of Christianity was deeply influenced by Koike's experience of spirit baptism in 1950, while participating in a special evangelistic meeting with Teshima Ikurō, the charismatic founder of the Original Gospel movement.
