= St. Scholastica's Academy, Pampanga =

Roman Catholic school in Pampanga, Philippines

St. Scholastica's Academy Pampanga
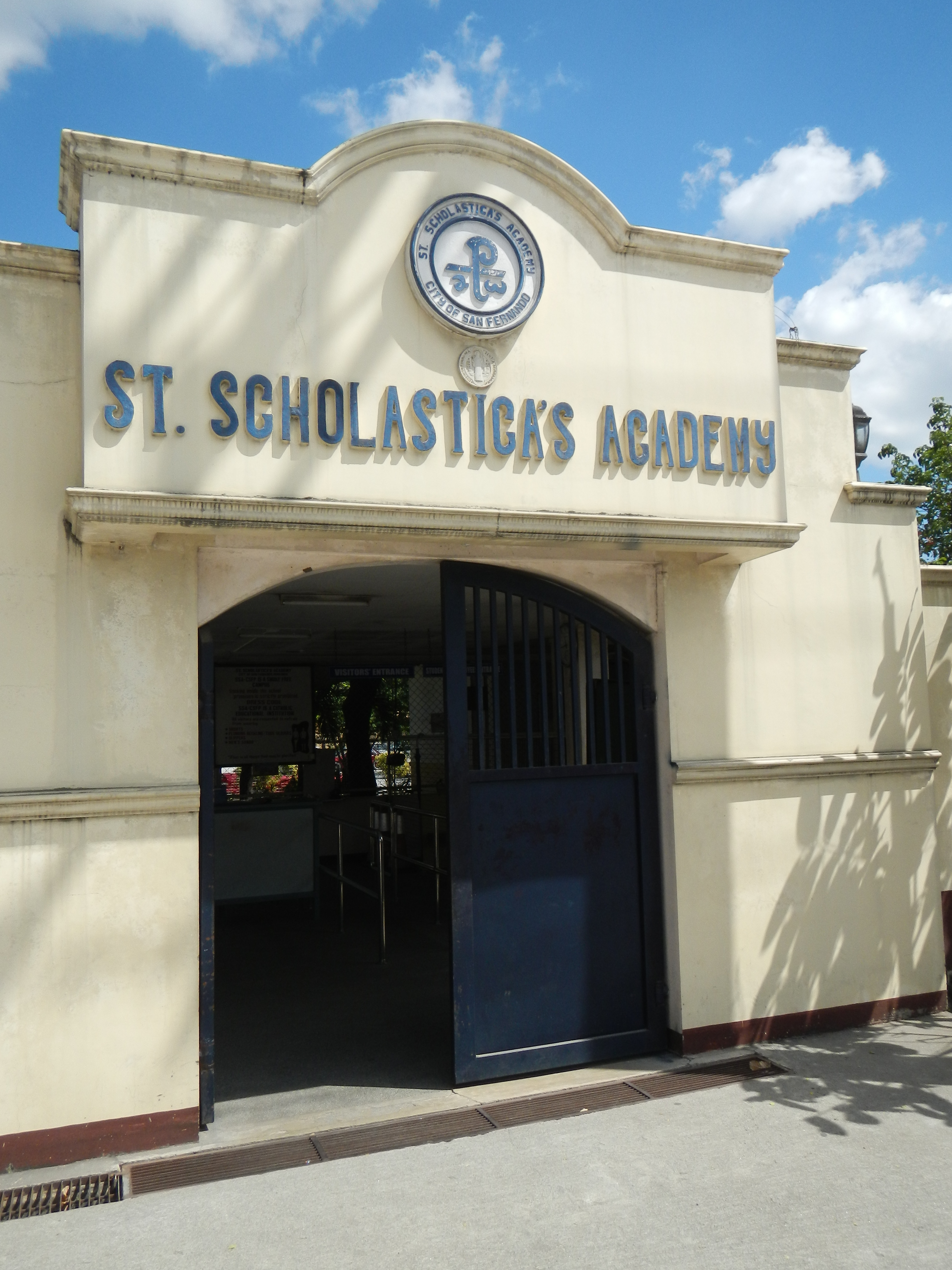

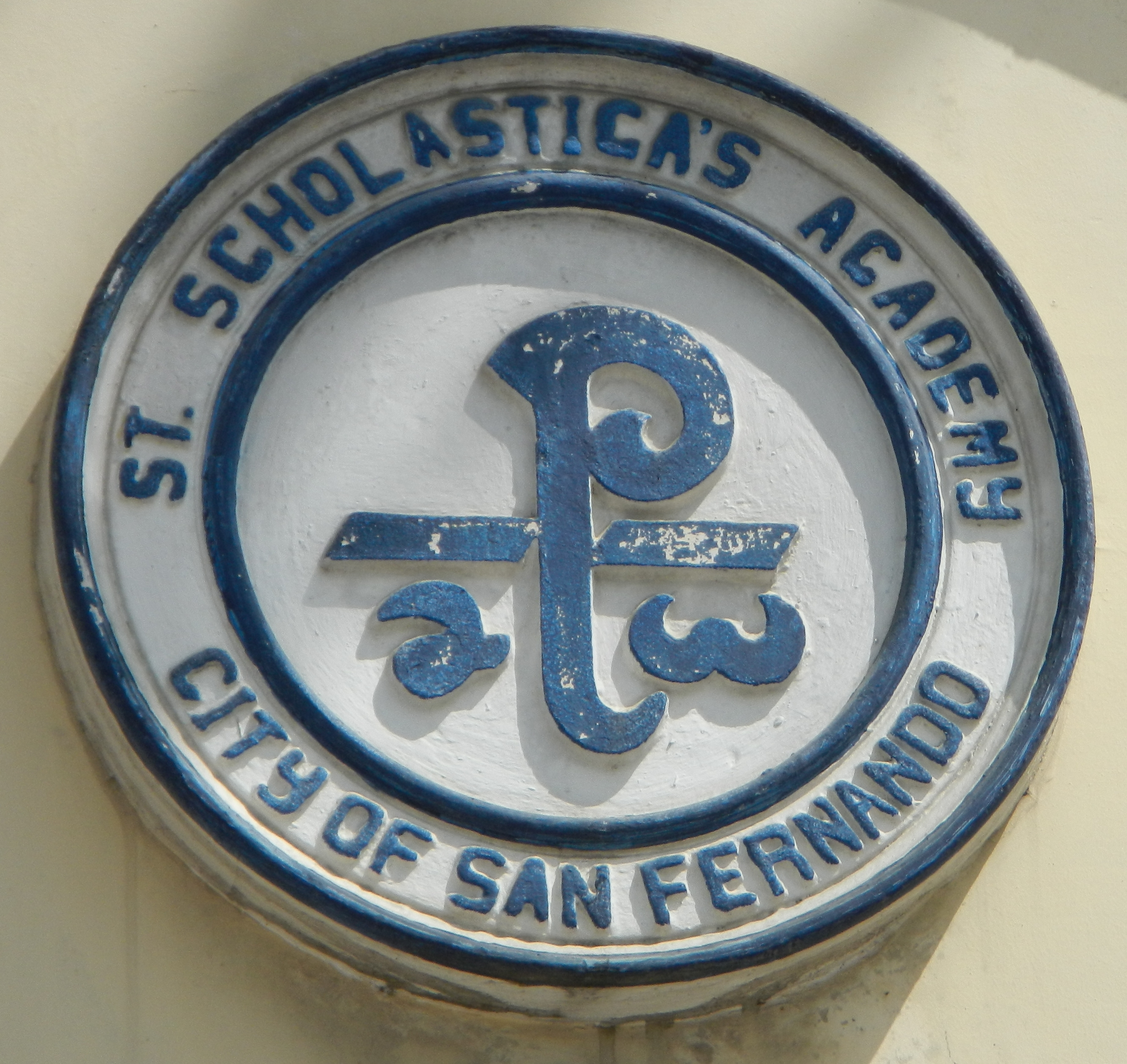

Location
- McArthur Highway, Brgy. San Agustin San Fernando, Pampanga; Philippines; 15°03′14″N 120°39′49″E

Information
- Former name: Assumption Academy (1925–1966); St. Scholastica's Academy, San Fernando
- Type: Private, Roman Catholic, Coeducational Basic education institution
- Motto: Ora et Labora (Latin) (Prayer and Work)
- Religious affiliations: Roman Catholic (Benedictine Sisters)
- Established: 1925; 101 years ago
- Founder: Congregation of the Missionary Benedictine Sisters of Tutzing
- Principal: Sr. Victoria Bulacan, OSB (Grade School Department) Ms. Julieta Tayag (High School Department)
- Directress: Sr. Mary John Mananzan, OSB
- Colors: Blue and White
- Nickname: Scholastican, Kulasa, Benitos
- Affiliations: PAASCU; ABS; WNCAA
- Alma Mater song: Loyalty Hymn
- Website: ssapamp.edu.ph
- St. Scholastica's Academy Pampanga Facade

The St. Scholastica's Academy is a private Catholic education institution run by the Congregation of the Missionary Benedictine Sisters of Tutzing in San Fernando City, Pampanga, Philippines. It was founded in June 1925 by the Benedictine Sisters.

== History ==
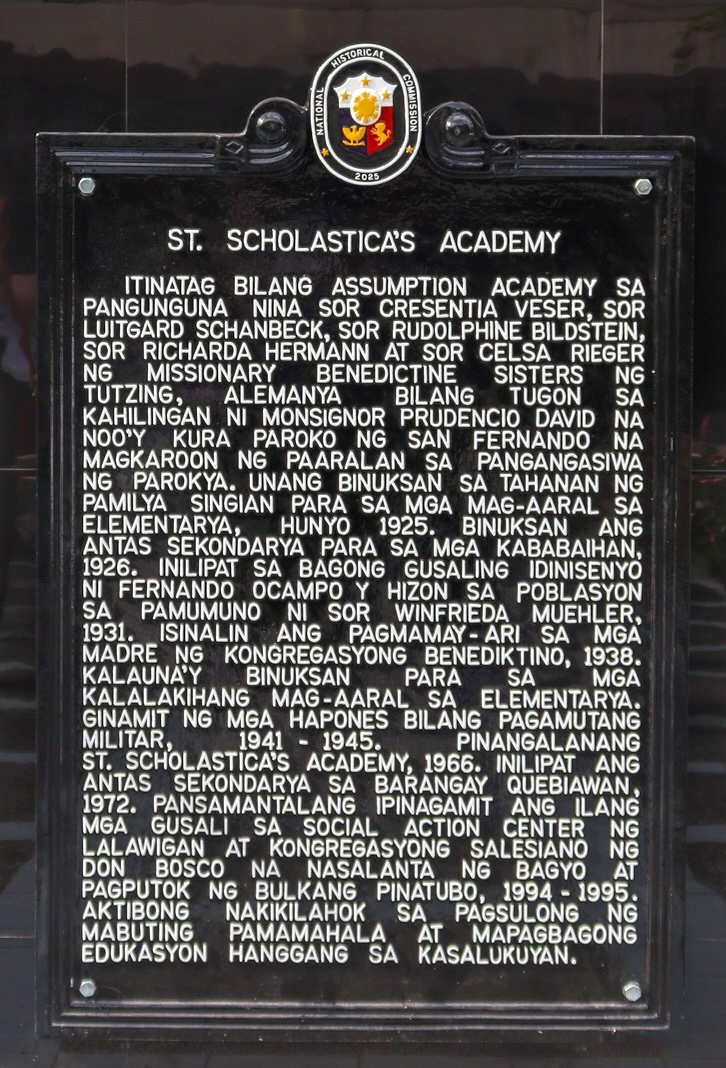
National historical marker installed in 2025

St. Scholastica's Academy of Pampanga is the third Benedictine school established in the Philippines. Formerly known as the Assumption Academy, it was established in June 1925 in the house of the Singian family. The high school department was added in school year 1926-27. In March 1930, the first secondary graduates of the Assumption Academy were presented. The Alumni/Alumnae and present students of this school include sons/daughters and granddaughters/son of businessmen, politicians, and prominent figures in Pampanga.

Due to the large number of enrollees, and the zeal of its biggest benefactor, Monsignor Prudencio David, the school was relocated to its second site in 1931, and ownership of the school was passed on to the Benedictine Sisters in 1938. With the outbreak of World War II, the building was used as a military hospital. In 1966, the school was renamed St. Scholastica's Academy of Pampanga. The school was transferred to a bigger site in 1972, leaving the old building without occupants. The school was exclusively girls only, but due to the clamor of the parents of the female students, now, St. Scholastica's Academy (SSA) accepts boys only up until Senior High School (Grades 11 & 12). The Senior High School Department opened its doors to male students at S.Y 2026-2027.

In 1972, partly as a solution, the High School Department was transferred to the wide barren grounds in Cer-Hil, Quebiawan, five kilometers from the town proper. The previous match-like edifice has been expanded into an F-shaped building that houses the whole High School Department. A covered court with a stage, eating sheds, another building to house the Grade School Department and covered walks have been added through the combined efforts of the students, the alumnae, the PTA and the administration. On July 11, 1987, a building for the whole Grade School Department was blessed. The preschool later was transferred to a new building in 2001. The school has been recently renovated and the before F-shaped building of the high school department is now an E-shaped building to provide more classrooms for the students and on 2017 a new building was established to provide more rooms for the first batch of Grade 12 students.

Beset by continuing threat of natural calamities prompted by the eruption of Mount Pinatubo in 1991, SSA-SF was challenged to strengthen/further its social orientation through various curricular processes and continuing community involvement projects and activities.

In 1992, it opened its door and provided temporary office for the Social Action Center of Pampanga (SACOP) and in 1994, it housed the lahar victims coming from various towns of Pampanga. The year after, SSA-SF shared its campus with Don Bosco Academy, Pampanga, a school which was totally buried in lahar.

SSA-SF also suffered a tremendous drop in its enrollment in 1996 due to the devastation of lahar, but was able to recover the next year. Through all of these, SSA-SF continued its quest for excellence that in 1991, the High School Department was accredited by PAASCU and the Grade School Department in 2000 and 2014.

Due to the short number of 8th grade students in the school year 2015–2016, the number of 8th grade sections were reduced to 6. As of school year 2023-2024 onwards, it has been reverted back to 7.

In the school year 2017–2018, St. Elizabeth was removed due to depleted number of students in Grade 11 and only St. Amalberga is the pure STEM stranded section while the other four sections in Grade 12 are mixed STEM and ABM sections.

In the school year 2016–2017, the school planned to expand its offered tracks in senior high school in the proceeding school year and as promised, for the next school year, General Academics (GA) and Humanities and Social Sciences (HUMSS) are now added for the senior high school.

== Benedictine motto ==
Ora et Labora
"Prayer and Work"

== Academics ==
SSA-SF is LEVEL 3 PAASCU-accredited.

The High School Faculty is being headed by the principal herself. And academic functions are being carried out by the Academic Coordinator, Assistant Academic Coordinator, Subject Area Coordinators and Subject Teachers respectively.

== Affiliations ==
It is a member of the Association of Benedictine Schools (ABS), the Philippine Accrediting Association of Schools, Colleges and Universities (PAASCU) and Women's National Collegiate Association (WNCAA)- Central Luzon

== Facilities ==
- St. Scholastica's Chapel
- Libraries
- Audio Visual Room
- Recording Studio
- Science Laboratories (specifically Physics Laboratory, Chemistry Laboratory, Biology Laboratory and Earth Science Laboratory in the High School)
- Clinic
- School Store and Canteen
- Computer Laboratories
- Amrhein Hall
- St. Cecilia's Covered Court
- Dance Studio
- Swimming Pool
- Music Room
- H.E. (Home Economics) Room
- Art Room
- Sewing Room
- Volleyball Court

== Student activities ==
- Retreats and Recollections
- Extra and Co-Curricular Activities
- School Publications
- Guidelines for Participation in Activities
- Organizations or Club Activities
- Class Activity
- Social Involvement Program
- Catechesis

== Subjects ==
=== Academics ===
- Science
- Araling Panlipunan
- Filipino
- English (High School Students)
- Reading (Grade School Pupils)
- Language (Grade School Pupils)
- Mother Tongue (exclusively for grades 1-3 students)
- Mathematics
- CLE (Christian Living Education)
- Computer
- HELE (Home Economics Livelihood Education)

=== Non-Academics ===
- Home Economics and Living Education (Grades 4-6)
- Sewing and Handicrafts (Grade 7)
- Food and Home Management (Grade 8)
- Baking and Pastry Production (Grade 9)
- P.E. (Physical Education)
- English Speech (Grade 9)
- Music
- Computer (ICT or Information Communication Technology in High School)
- Arts
- Visual Arts (Grade 7 and Grade 8 students)
- Bookkeeping (exclusively for Grade 9 students)
- Business Arts (exclusively for Grade 10 students)
- Swimming (exclusively for grade 7 and Grade 8 students)
- Art Technology (exclusively for Grade 10 students)

== Clubs in Grade School ==
CLE-related Clubs:

- Pax Benedictina (Gr.3-6)

Drama Club:

- Teatrong KulaSSA

Math-related Clubs:

- Math Rangers (Gr.3-6)
- Cyberkada (Gr. 3-6)

Science-related Clubs:

- Earth Keepers (Gr.3-6)

Araling Panlipunan-related Clubs:

- Scouting Movement

Music-related Clubs:

- Glee Club (Gr.3-6)
- Guitar Club
- Benedictine Percussionists (Drum and Lyre)

Arts-related Clubs:

- Guhit Bulilit (Gr. 1&2)
- Likhang Kamay (Gr.3-6)

Sports-related Clubs:

- Sports Club (Gr.3&4)
- Basketball Club for boys
- Volleyball Club
- Badminton Club

H.E.L.E.-related Clubs:

- Future Homemakers

Other Clubs:

- The Little Blue Quill
- Junior Assembly
- Academic Club (Gr.5&6)

== Clubs in High School ==
Religious Clubs:

- PAX BENEDICTINA
- Magnificat

Academic Clubs:

- MATHRIX Circle
- SciEarTech Movement

Socio-Civic Clubs:

- Earth Savers' Club
- KAMPIL (Kamalayang Pilipino)
- Young Women's Club

Communication/Literary Arts Clubs:

- Blue Quill
- Speech and Drama Club
- SESFIL (Samahan ng mga Eskolastikan sa Filipino)

Special Interest Clubs

- Booktopia
- Cyberscho
- Homemakers' Club
- Likhang Kamay

Performing Arts Clubs

- Dance Ministry of SSA
- Glee Club
- Guitar Club
- Sports Clubs
  - Badminton Club
  - Basketball Club
  - Swimming Club
  - Volleyball Club

Other Special Interest Club:

- Peer Facilitating Circle
- Recreational Club
- E-Sports Club

== Student Council Organization (SCO) ==
The Student Council Organization is the representative of the secondary school students of St. Scholastica's Academy. It is composed of the SCO officers (President, Vice-President, Secretary, Treasurer, Auditor, PRO) and Class Presidents and Secretaries.

The SCO creates the rules and regulations needed to carry out it's objectives, but is subjected to the approval of the High School Principal.

It shall enact measures that complement and supplement the work in school and serve as the coordinating body of all student organizations.

== Publications ==
- The Little Blue Quill (Grade School's Official Publication)
- The Blue Quill (High School's Official Publication)

== Notable alumnae ==
- Helen Nicolette Henson-Hizon - model, Bb.Pilipinas 2nd Runner-up, (now in: OFW Staten Island, New York)
- Jayann Bautista - singer, Pinoy Idol 1st Runner-up
- Lot D. Hilvano - interior designer, Professional Regulation Commission Board of Interior Design, Presidential Appointee
