= Brian V. Johnstone =

Australian Roman Catholic priest (1938-2023)

Brian V. Johnstone, C.Ss.R. (5 December 1938 – 16 April 2023) was an Australian Roman Catholic Redemptorist priest and moral theologian. He was born in Brighton, Australia, and over the course of his career, he taught at a number of places, including Yarra Theological Union, Melbourne; The Catholic University of America, Washington, D.C.; and the Academia Alfonsiana in Rome.

== Priestly studies ==
Believing himself called to the priesthood and religious life, Johnstone entered the Congregation of the Most Holy Redeemer. He professed his final vows on 25 February 1958 and then began seminary studies for the priesthood at St. Mary’s Ballarat which he completed in 1965. Meanwhile, on 5 July 1964 he was ordained a priest.

Johnstone's superiors assigned him to further studies in Rome. From 1967-1968, he pursued a Licentiate of Sacred Theology at the Collegium Anselmianum. After achieving his S.T.L., he continued studies in Moral Theology at the University of Bonn from 1968 to 1970, next at the University of Tübingen in 1970, and then at the University of Leuven from 1971 to 1972 where in 1973, he successfully defended his doctoral dissertation entitled Eschatology and Ethics: A Critical Survey of the Development of Social Ethics in the Ecumenical Discussion, 1925-1968.

== Academic career ==
Johnstone, having earned both a Ph.D. and S.T.D., was named Lecturer in Moral Theology at Yarra Theological Union, Melbourne. He held this post from 1973 to 1981, and was co-terminously visiting Lecturer at the Catholic Theological College, the Archdiocesan Seminary in Clayton from 1975 to 1981, and Visiting Professor at Loyola School of Theology in Manila, Philippines from 1975 to 1976.

In 1981, he moved to the United States to take on a position teaching Moral Theology as a member of the School of Theology at Catholic University of America, Washington, D.C. This was at the time of Charles Curran who because of his dissent from Catholic teaching was no longer allowed to teach at the University in 1986. Johnstone, meanwhile, was awarded “Continuous Tenure” at the Catholic University of America on 3 June 1987.

Noted for his deep learning, respect for those with differing viewpoints, and his intelligent loyalty to the Magisterium, he was invited to teach Special and Systematic Moral Theology in Rome. He was as a Professor at the Alphonsian Academy until 2006 and Visiting Professor at the Pontifical Gregorian University until 1996.

In 2006, Johnstone returned to Washington, D.C to take up again a professorship at The Catholic University of America. He taught courses on Fundamental Moral Theology, The Moral Theology of the Gift, Biomedical Ethics, Bioethics for Nurses, Peace and War, Human Rights, Probabilism and Conscience, and Problems of Bioethics.

== Extracurricular activities ==
Besides teaching, Johnstone had been a member of the Ethics in Research Committee of Queen Victoria Health Care Center, Melbourne from 1978 to 1981; a co-researcher at the Long Term Study of End State Renal Disease, funded by Department of Human Services, U.S.A. from 1985 to 1986; a member of ARCIC II, for the composition of the document on Moral Theology, Life in Christ, from 1990 to 1994; Chaplain at Clinica del Sacro Cuore in Rome, a hospice for cancer patients, from 1986 until 2005; and on a number of occasions a participant in Congress of the Pontifical Academy for Life.

== Death ==
Johnstone died at Box Hill Hospital in Melbourne on 16 April 2023, at the age of 84.

== Works ==
Johnstone wrote numerous articles for books, and online and printed journals, especially for Studia Moralia.

- Johnstone, Brian V. (1984) "The Right to Privacy: The Ethical Perspective," American Journal of Jurisprudence: Vol. 29: Iss. 1, Article 4.
- Johnstone, Brian V. The Status of the Human Embryo: Catholic Teaching and the Role of Reason Lifeissues.net

Johnstone endeavored to use the paradigm of Giving-and-Receiving to deepen his understanding of moral theology. According to his faculty page at The Catholic University of America:

Philosophy of the Gift is a project extending the philosophical and ethical concept of giving a "gift" to a new framework for moral theology, by defining the ultimate and absolutely gratuitous gift of self as that of Jesus Christ on the Cross, completed in the Resurrection.

== Links ==
- http://trs.cua.edu/faculty/Johnstone/index.cfm
- http://trs.cua.edu/res/docs/faculty-pages/johnstone/johnstone%20CV%2008.pdf
- http://aejt.com.au/__data/assets/pdf_file/0003/395535/AEJT_4.9_Johnstone.pdf
- http://onlinelibrary.wiley.com/doi/10.1111/j.1758-6623.1996.tb03461.x/abstract?userIsAuthenticated=false&deniedAccessCustomisedMessage=
- https://www.youtube.com/watch?v=HRf-GQQq-k4
- http://www.kingscollege.net/gbrodie/Johnstone%20Revisionist%20Project%20in%20RC%20MT.html
