= Ecclesia Catholica =

Ecclesia Catholica may refer to:

- Ecclesia Catholica, the Latin-language name of the Catholic Church
- Ecclesia Catholica, the title of a 1949 instruction of the Holy Office on the Catholic Church's initial attitudes towards the ecumenical movement
- A podcast on the history of the Christian Church
