= Ordinarium Sanctae Romanae Ecclesiae =

Ordinarium Sanctae Romanae Ecclesiae is a document written by Jacobi Gaytani that furthered the development of the papal conclave by establishing a voting procedure currently referred to as "approval voting". The document is notable in that it is not a papal bull or decree but was treated as law by subsequent papal elections.

Gaytani (a participant in five papal conclaves between 1305 and 1352) included no restriction on the number of candidates a cardinal could include on his ballot during a scrutiny, but advised not to choose too many "for decency and expediency". The combination of approval voting with the pre-existing requirement of a two-thirds supermajority has several "bizarre consequences"; for example, it can result in more than one candidate receiving a supermajority even if only one third of the electorate chooses more than one candidate.

Each round of voting was also treated as distinct; that is candidates remained eligible in all future scrutinies even if they had not received a single vote previously.

Approval voting was used in the forty-one conclaves from 1294 to 1621, after which it was replaced with a categoric vote by Eterni Pacis (1621) and Decet Romanum Pontificem (1622).
