= Foundation University (Philippines) =

Private university in Negros Oriental, Philippines

- Pamantasang Foundation (Filipino)
- Former name: Foundation College (1949–1969)
- Motto: Veritas
- Motto in English: Truth
- Type: Private, non-sectarian basic and higher education institution
- Established: July 4, 1949; 77 years ago
- Founder: Dr. Vicente G. Sinco
- Academic affiliations: PAASCU, PACUCOA
- Chairman: Victor Vicente G. Sinco
- Chancellor: Charlotte V. Cariño
- President: Victor Vicente G. Sinco
- Administrative staff: 200
- Location: Dr. Miciano Road Dumaguete, Negros Oriental, Philippines; 9°18′20″N 123°18′00″E
- Campus: Urban 5.5 ha (55,000 m^{2})
- Alma Mater song: Foundation University Hymn
- Colors: Maroon and Grey
- Nickname: Greyhounds
- Sporting affiliations: UNIGAMES
- Website: www.foundationu.com
- Location in the Visayas Location in the Philippines

Foundation University, also referred to by its acronym FU or simply Foundation, is a private non-sectarian basic and higher education institution in Dumaguete, Philippines. It was founded by Dr. Vicente Guzman Sinco, former president of the University of the Philippines and an alumnus of Silliman University. It offers over 60 specialized higher education areas of study accredited with the PAASCU, CHED, and the Philippine Association of Colleges and Universities Commission on Accreditation. The university is known as the birthplace of Negros Oriental's Buglasan Festival. The university is also known as an eco-friendly school. In 2015, Foundation University was awarded National Champion by the DENR - Environmental Management Bureau (EMB) for being the Most Sustainable and Eco-Friendly Campus.

== History ==
The university was established as Foundation College on July 4, 1949. It was granted university status by the Department of Education on January 28, 1969. The university offers many undergraduate courses such as in the fields of elementary education, secondary education, nursing, information technology, computer science, agriculture, engineering, law and many others. The university has schools for elementary and high school.

Established on the eve of the country's independence, it was then known as the Foundation College. The college was founded by Dr. Vicente Guzman Sinco, a known educator and legal luminary during his time. (Note: Dr. Vicente Guzman Sinco was a professor, and later the eighth president of the University of the Philippines. He was also one of the delegates who signed the UN Charter for the Philippines. During his time, Sinco wrote many books and was a known constitutionalist. Today his works are being quoted by known legal authors such as Fr. Joaquin G. Bernas and Hector S. De Leon.) Sinco envisioned the college to contribute to the overall national program of development. During the time of the college's founding, Filipinos were still in the process of building the nation.

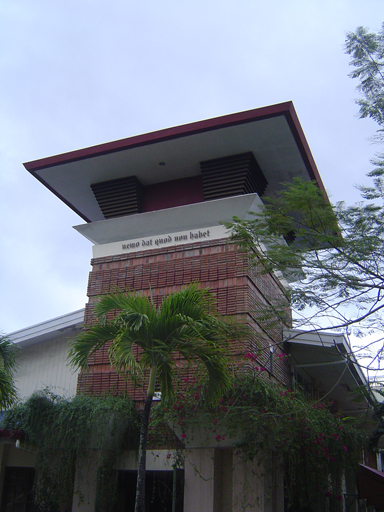
University Tower

The college had a three-fold function — instruction, research, and community action. The success of this mission was recognized in 1963, when Foundation College received international recognition and was invited to become a member of the International Association of Universities. The college was the first institution in the Visayas and Mindanao to receive this honor, and the first institution in the world that was not a full university to become a member of this organization.

On January 28, 1969, the Philippine Department of Education granted the college a university charter.

== Colleges and schools ==
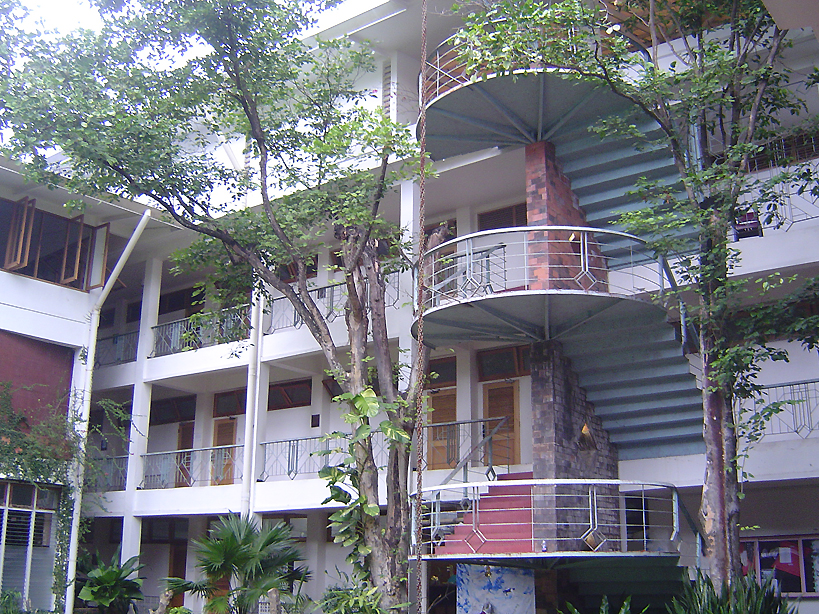
College of Arts and Sciences

Academic units of the university are organized into nine colleges and several other schools and departments.

- College of Arts and Sciences
- College of Business Administration
- College of Education
- College of Computer Studies
- College of Nursing
- College of Agriculture
- College of Law and Jurisprudence
- College of Hospitality Management
- College of Criminology
- School of Industrial Engineering and Technology
- Graduate School
- Department of Architecture and Fine Arts
- Foundation Preparatory Academy

== Media ==
Since October 2012, the university has its own radio station called Greyhound 101.
