= Baguio Central University =

Private university in Baguio, Philippines

- Pamantansang Baguio Central (Filipino)
- Former names: Centro Academy (1945–1949); Centro Industrial School (1949–); Eastern Philippines College, Lyceum of Baguio (1976–1977)
- Motto: Libertad, Justicia, Veritas, Equitas
- Motto in English: Liberty, Justice, Truth, Equality
- Type: Private Non-sectarian Research Coeducational Basic and Higher education institution
- Established: 1945; 81 years ago
- Founders: Godofredo Fernandez; Margarita J. Fernandez
- Religious affiliation: Non-sectarian
- President: Margarita Cecilda Rillera
- Vice-president: Elma Donaal (VP for Academic Affairs)
- Location: Bonifacio Street, ABCR Barangay, Baguio, Benguet, Philippines; 16°25′02″N 120°35′48″E
- Campus: Urban Main: Bonifacio Campus ABCR Barangay, Baguio satellite: Magsaysay Campus Padre Burgos Campus.
- Colors: Gold and Maroon
- Nickname: Eagles
- Sporting affiliations: BBEAL
- Website: www.bcu.edu.ph
- Location in Luzon Location in the Philippines

Baguio Central University is a private, non-sectarian, basic and higher education institution in Baguio City, Philippines. It offers education to high school and preschool students. It is also known for its vocational courses.

== History ==
This institution was established by Godofredo Fernandez in 1945 and started offering vocational courses. The school was first known as 'Centro Academy'. After four years of success, the school started to offer a high school program with its vocational courses to serve students for another option after their vocational training. With its desire for helping many students in the city, the school evolves itself offering degree programs in 1951.

The Board of Directors changed its name into 'Lyceum of Baguio' in 1976, then changed it to Baguio Central University in 1977. The school continued to expand their academic programs until 2002. The school has many campuses in the city to give their students a comfortable environment.

== Academics ==
The university has nine collegiate divisions that includes College of Criminology, College of Liberal Arts and Public Administration, College of Physical Therapy, College of Nursing, College of Information Technology as well as College of Administration. The university has associate courses such as Associate in Computer Technology and Associate in Hotel and Restaurant Management.

Associate in Health Science was included in the medical courses in 1998. The Pio H. Joven Research Center Inc. was established and the university's services were extended outside the Philippines. Sisterhood ties has been established with Presbyterian General Assembly Theological College and Seminary in South Korea.

As per Executive Order 330, the university has been accredited by the Commission on Higher Education and gave the certificate of authorization to the university to accredit, provide equivalency, and to confer academic degree in BS Education, Bachelor of Arts and Sciences, Master of Arts in Education, Master in Public and Business Administration, Doctor of Education, and Doctor of Philosophy.

== See also ==
- GMA News Online
- Universities and Colleges in the Philippines
