= Anscar Chupungco =

Filipino Benedictine theologian (1939–2013)

Dom Anscar Javier Chupungco O.S.B.
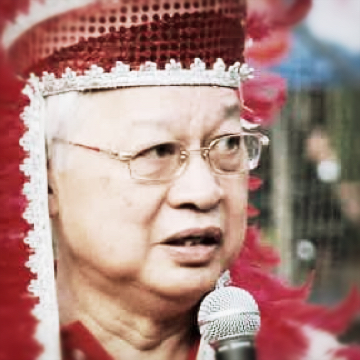
- Born: Herminio Javier Chupungco; November 10, 1939; Cainta, Rizal
- Died: January 9, 2013 (aged 73); Malaybalay, Bukidnon, Philippines
- Resting place: Benedictines plot, La Loma Cemetery
- Occupations: Priest, Liturgist, Professor
- Years active: 1958-2013
- Known for: Liturgy
- Parent(s): Estanislao Santo Tomas Chupungco and Dominga Javier

Ecclesiastical career
- Church: Catholic Church
- Ordained: 10 March 1979
- Writings: Handbook for Liturgical Studies
- Congregations: Benedictines

Dom Anscar Javier Chupungco OSB (born Herminio Javier Chupungco; 10 November 1939 – 9 January 2013) was a Filipino Benedictine liturgist, theologian and educator at the Pontifical Atheneum of St. Anselm in Rome and San Beda University in Manila. He was known for integrating local customs and traditions into the Catholic Mass.

== Biography ==
Chupungco was born in Cainta, Rizal, to Estanislao Santo Tomas Chupungco and Dominga Javier. He became a monk of the Abbey of Our Lady of Montserrat in Manila in 1958 at the age of 19, at which time he was given the religious name of Anscar (after Ansgar, a Benedictine missionary saint of the 9th century. He was ordained a priest in 1965.

Chupungco earned his licentiate in philosophy and theology (both magna cum laude) from the University of Santo Tomas in Manila and his doctorate in Sacred Theology, specializing in liturgy, from the Pontifical Atheneum of St. Anselm, learning from the scholars in the field who had served as periti (expert consultants) during the Second Vatican Council.

=== Ministry ===
Chupungco became a member of the faculty of the Pontifical Institute of Sacred Liturgy in Rome in 1973, the first Filipino to teach there. He was later chosen as the president of the institute and rector magnificus of the Atheneum. He also established the Paul VI Institute of Liturgy in the Philippines, in conjunction with the Bishop of Malaybalay,Gaudencio Rosales. This faculty was to serve as a center for forming liturgists to serve throughout Asia. He was also one of the co-founders of the Maryhill School of Theology, together with four priests from the Missionary Fathers of the Immaculate Heart.

As a leading expert in liturgy, Chupungco was sought after in many parts of the world. He also produced the Handbook for Liturgical Studies, which became a standard set of textbooks for liturgical education in the world. He was a board member of the Congregation for Divine Worship and the Discipline of the Sacraments in Rome.

In 2011 he was awarded the prestigious McManus Award by the Federation of Diocesan Liturgical Commissions of the United States. He was also a member of the International Commission on English in the Liturgy during the time it produced the first English language translation of the Roman Missal for use around the world.

=== Later years ===
In his last years, Chupungco occupied himself with liturgical formation at Paul VI Institute of Liturgy and speaking engagements all over the world. Speaking of recent changes in the liturgical texts mandated by the Holy See, he commented in an address in October 2011 that:

[Liturgical reform] "is being put to task by a movement known as the "reform of the reform". It carries an agenda that can have a regrettable impact on the liturgical gains of the council.

Dark clouds are forming ominously on the western horizon. They move hurriedly and decisively toward the direction of the sun that burns radiantly in the sky. They cast upon it their somber shadows to hide it from view. Suddenly it is dusk before the appointed time.

In reality however the dimness is caused by the passing clouds. I am confident that these cannot put the clock back to yesterday's evening hours.

=== Death ===
Chupungco died from a heart attack on 9 January 2013, at the Paul VI Institute of Liturgy in Malaybalay. He had been scheduled to receive the Pro Ecclesia et Pontifice Award from Pope Benedict XVI in a few weeks, to honor him for his decades of service to the Church. His body was returned to his abbey for burial.

== See also ==
- Catholic Church in the Philippines
- Culture of the Philippines
- Hispanic culture in The Philippines
