= 2011 Philippine Collegiate Championship =

Men's Finals	G1	G2	Wins
San Sebastian Stags	51	73	1+1
Ateneo Blue Eagles	56	67	1
- Duration: December 12–15
- Arena(s): Filoil Flying V Arena
- Finals MVP: Ian Sangalang
- Winning coach: Topex Robinson
- Semifinalists: San Beda Red Lions; UC Webmasters
- TV network(s): Studio 23

The 2011 Philippine Collegiate Championship was the fourth Philippine Collegiate Championship for basketball in its current incarnation, and the ninth edition overall.

The San Sebastian Stags defeated the two-time defending champion Ateneo Blue Eagles in the championship series where the Stags had a twice-to-beat advantage and denied the Blue Eagles for a chance of a three-peat in the tournament; meanwhile, the San Beda Red Lions defeated the UC Webmasters in the third-place game, 82–69.

== Format ==
The 2011 championship will feature a new format. The format ensures that the University Athletic Association of the Philippines (UAAP) and National Collegiate Athletic Association (NCAA) champions automatically qualify to a round robin Final Four, and the respective semifinalists in both leagues and the finalists in the Cebu Schools Athletic Foundation, Inc. (CESAFI) qualify for the main draw. Other teams would have to qualify through the regional championships. In the Final Four, the team with the best record will have a twice-to-beat advantage against the #2 team.

== Regional championships ==
=== North/Central Luzon ===
Champion teams from Vigan, Pampanga, Pangasinan and Baguio will dispute one berth that will face one of the two winners in the Metro Manila regionals.

=== Metro Manila ===
Champion teams from the Inter-Scholastic Athletic Association (ISAA), National Athletic Association of Schools, Colleges and Universities (NAASCU), Universities and Colleges Athletic Association (UCAA), Universities and Colleges of Luzon Athletic Association (UCLAAI) and the Men's National Collegiate Athletic Association (MNCAA), and non-playoff teams (5th and 6th) from the UAAP and NCAA will dispute two berths. One winner will face the North/Central Luzon champion while another will face the South Luzon/Bicol champion.

=== South Luzon/Bicol ===
Champion teams from the National Collegiate Athletic Association (Philippines) South, Quezon, Legazpi City, Sorsogon and Naga will dispute one berth that will face one of the two winners in the Metro Manila regionals.

=== Visayas ===
Champion teams from the Visayas will dispute one berth that will face the CESAFI runner-up in the main draw.

=== Mindanao ===
Champion teams from Mindanao will dispute one berth that will face the CESAFI champion in the main draw.

== Qualifying ==
=== Automatic qualifiers ===
Team	League	Elim. round finish	Playoff finish	Qualified as
Ateneo Blue Eagles	UAAP	1st (13–1)	Defeated FEU in the finals	UAAP champion
FEU Tamaraws	UAAP	3rd (9–5)	Defeated by Ateneo in the finals	UAAP runner-up
Adamson Soaring Falcons	UAAP	2nd (10–4)	Defeated by FEU in the semifinals	UAAP third place
UST Growling Tigers	UAAP	4th (8–6)	Defeated by Ateneo in the semifinals	UAAP fourth place
San Beda Red Lions	NCAA	1st (16–2)	Defeated San Sebastian in the finals	NCAA champion
San Sebastian Stags	NCAA	2nd (16–2)	Defeated by San Beda in the finals	NCAA runner-up
Letran Knights	NCAA	3rd (14–4)	Defeated by San Sebastian in the semifinals	NCAA third place
JRU Heavy Bombers	NCAA	4th (9–9)	Defeated by San Beda in the semifinals	NCAA fourth place
UC Webmasters	CESAFI	1st (10-2)	Defeated SWU in the finals	CESAFI champion
SWU Cobras	CESAFI	2nd (9-3)	Defeated by UC in the finals	CESAFI runner-up

=== Regional qualifiers ===
Team	League	Elim. round finish	Playoff finish	Qualified as	Regional tournament
UNP Sharks	Vigan	1st	Champions	Northern/Central Luzon champion	North/Central Luzon
NU Bulldogs	UAAP	5th (6-8)	DNQ	Metro Manila Group A winner	Metro Manila
De La Salle Green Archers	UAAP	6th (5-9)	DNQ	Metro Manila Group B winner	Metro Manila
UB Brahmans	NBOL	1st	Champions	Southern Luzon/Bicol champion	South Luzon/Bicol
STI-CDO Olympians	COSAA	1st	Champions	Mindanao champion	Mindanao
AMA Ormoc Titans	LUSCAA	1st	Champions	Visayas champion	Visayas

==== Metro Manila ====
Games were held at the Filoil Flying V Arena, San Juan

===== Group A =====
Semifinals; November 8
1	UM	78
4	TIP	69
3	NU	84
2	Lyceum	75

Final; November 10
UM	74
NU	103

===== Group B =====
Semifinals; November 9
1	CEU	68
4	Saint Francis	50
3	Mapúa	51
2	La Salle	56

Final; November 10
CEU	51
La Salle	79

==== Northern/Central Luzon ====
Games were held at the University of Northern Philippines campus at Vigan.

Semifinals; November 7 & 11
1	UNP
4	LUCNAS
3	U of Pangasinan
2	U of Cordilleras

Final; November 12
UNP	95
U of Pangasinan	77

==== Southern Luzon/Bicol ====
Games were held at the Naga Coliseum at Naga.

Semifinals; November 11
Ateneo de Naga	92
Lewis	44
Amando Cope	66
UB	91

Final; November 13
Ateneo de Naga	74
UB	81
Third place November 13
Lewis	84
Amando Cope	110

==== Mindanao ====
Games were held at the Almendras Gym at Davao City

Semifinals; November 14
STI-CDO	111
Ateneo de Zamboanga	74
Jose Maria College	107
Holy Trinity College	80

Final; November 16
STI-CDO	104
Jose Maria College	98
Third place November 16
Ateneo de Zamboanga	76
Holy Trinity College	110

==== Visayas ====
Games will be held at the Ormoc City Superdome at Ormoc from November 27 to 28.

Semifinals; November 27
1	UI	80
4	ACSAT Dumaguete	61
3	WNU	69
2	AMA Ormoc	71

Final; November 28
UI	81
AMA Ormoc	89

== Main draw ==
=== Luzon/Metro Manila bracket ===
Games were held at the Filoil Flying V Arena, San Juan, except for the regional final, which will be held at the Ormoc City Superdome, Ormoc.

==== First round ====
Studio 23

November 19

Match A

UNP Sharks	51–96	NU Bulldogs

Filoil Flying V Arena, San Juan

Studio 23

November 19

Match B

UB Brahmans	55–78	De La Salle Green Archers

Filoil Flying V Arena, San Juan

==== Second Round onwards ====
Second Round; November 21
NU	62
JRU	66
La Salle	72
UST	67

Third round November 22
JRU	58
Adamson	73
La Salle	61
Letran	66

Regional semifinals November 24
Adamson	83
San Sebastian	85*
Letran	73
FEU	64

Regional final November 30
San Sebastian	83
Letran	76

*Overtime

=== Southern Islands bracket ===
Games were held at the Ormoc City Superdome, Ormoc.

Regional semifinals November 29
1	AMA Ormoc	61
4	SWU	90
3	STI-CDO	90
2	UC	99

Regional final November 30
SWU	58
UC	63

=== Final four ===
Games are set to be held at the Filoil Flying V Arena, San Juan.

==== Team standings ====
Pos	Team	W	L	PCT	GB	Qualification
1	San Sebastian Stags	2	1	.667 (Note: Head-to-head record: San Sebastian 1–0 Ateneo)	—	Twice-to-beat in the finals
2	Ateneo Blue Eagles	2	1	.667	—	Twice-to-win in the finals
3	San Beda Red Lions	1	2	.333 (Note: Head-to-head record: San Beda 1–0 UC)	1	Proceed to third place playoff
4	UC Webmasters	1	2	.333	1	Proceed to third place playoff

==== Schedule ====
Team ╲ Game	1	2	3
Ateneo	JRU school colors	SSC-R school colors	San Beda school colors
San Beda	SSC-R school colors	JRU school colors	Ateneo school colors
San Sebastian	San Beda school colors	Ateneo school colors	JRU school colors
UC	Ateneo school colors	San Beda school colors	SSC-R school colors

= Win; = Loss

==== Results ====
Team	ADMU	SBC	SSC-R	UC
Ateneo		76–63	69–70	100–53
San Beda			72–87	83–77
San Sebastian				71–92
UC				

Legend: Blue = left column team win; Red = top row team win.

=== Third place playoff ===
Studio 23

December 12

San Beda Red Lions	82–69	UC Webmasters

Filoil Flying V Arena, San Juan

=== Finals ===
Studio 23

December 12

San Sebastian Stags	51–56	Ateneo Blue Eagles

Filoil Flying V Arena, San Juan

Studio 23

December 15

San Sebastian Stags	73–67	Ateneo Blue Eagles
San Sebastian wins series in two games

Filoil Flying V Arena, San Juan

== UAAP-NCAA Juniors Dual Meet ==
This tournament is for the benefit of Kapit Bisig Para sa Pasig, a project of the ABS-CBN Foundation. The runners-up of the NCAA and UAAP will battle for the third spot while the champion of each league will battle for the top spot.

=== Third place playoff ===
Studio 23

December 8

FEU–D Baby Tamaraws	85–77	La Salle Green Hills Greenies

Filoil Flying V Arena, San Juan

=== Championship ===
Studio 23

December 9

NUNS Bullpups	76–92	San Beda Red Cubs

Filoil Flying V Arena, San Juan

== Awards ==
The awardees are:

- Most Valuable Player: Ian Sangalang (San Sebastian Stags)
- Mythical Five:
  - Nico Salva (Ateneo Blue Eagles)
  - Greg Slaughter (Ateneo Blue Eagles)
  - Calvin Abueva (San Sebastian Stags)
  - Ian Sangalang (San Sebastian Stags)
  - June Mar Fajardo (UC Webmasters)
- Best Coach: Topex Robinson (San Sebastian Stags)

== Final rankings ==
Rank	Team
1	San Sebastian Stags
2	Ateneo Blue Eagles
3	San Beda Red Lions
4	UC Webmasters
5	Letran Knights
6	SWU Cobras
7	Adamson Soaring Falcons
8	FEU Tamaraws
9	JRU Heavy Bombers
10	De La Salle Green Archers
11	UST Growling Tigers
12	NU Bulldogs
13	AMA Ormoc Titans
14	STI-CDO Olympians
15	UB Brahmans
16	UNP Sharks

Preceded by 2010	Philippine Collegiate Championship; 2011	Succeeded by 2012
