= Araullo University =

Private university in Nueva Ecija, Philippines

PHINMA - Araullo University
- Pamantasan ng Araullo (Filipino)
- Pamantasan ng Araullo Logo
- Former names: Araullo Law School (1950–1969); Araullo Lyceum (1969–1983); Pamantasan ng Araullo (1983–2004); Araullo University - PHINMA Education Network (2004–2016); PHINMA - Araullo University (2016–present)
- Motto: Making Lives Better Through Education
- Type: Private, Non-Sectarian secondary and higher education institution
- Established: 1950; 76 years ago
- Founders: Esteban and Castelo families
- Accreditation: PACU-COA
- Affiliations: PHINMA Education Network
- President: Restituto O. Bundoc
- Location: Maharlika Highway, Bitas, Cabanatuan, Nueva Ecija, Philippines; 15°29′43″N 120°58′28″E
- Campus: Urban 5 hectares (50,000 m^{2})
- Colors: Blue and gold
- Website: www.au.phinma.edu.ph
- Location in Nueva Ecija Location in Luzon Location in the Philippines

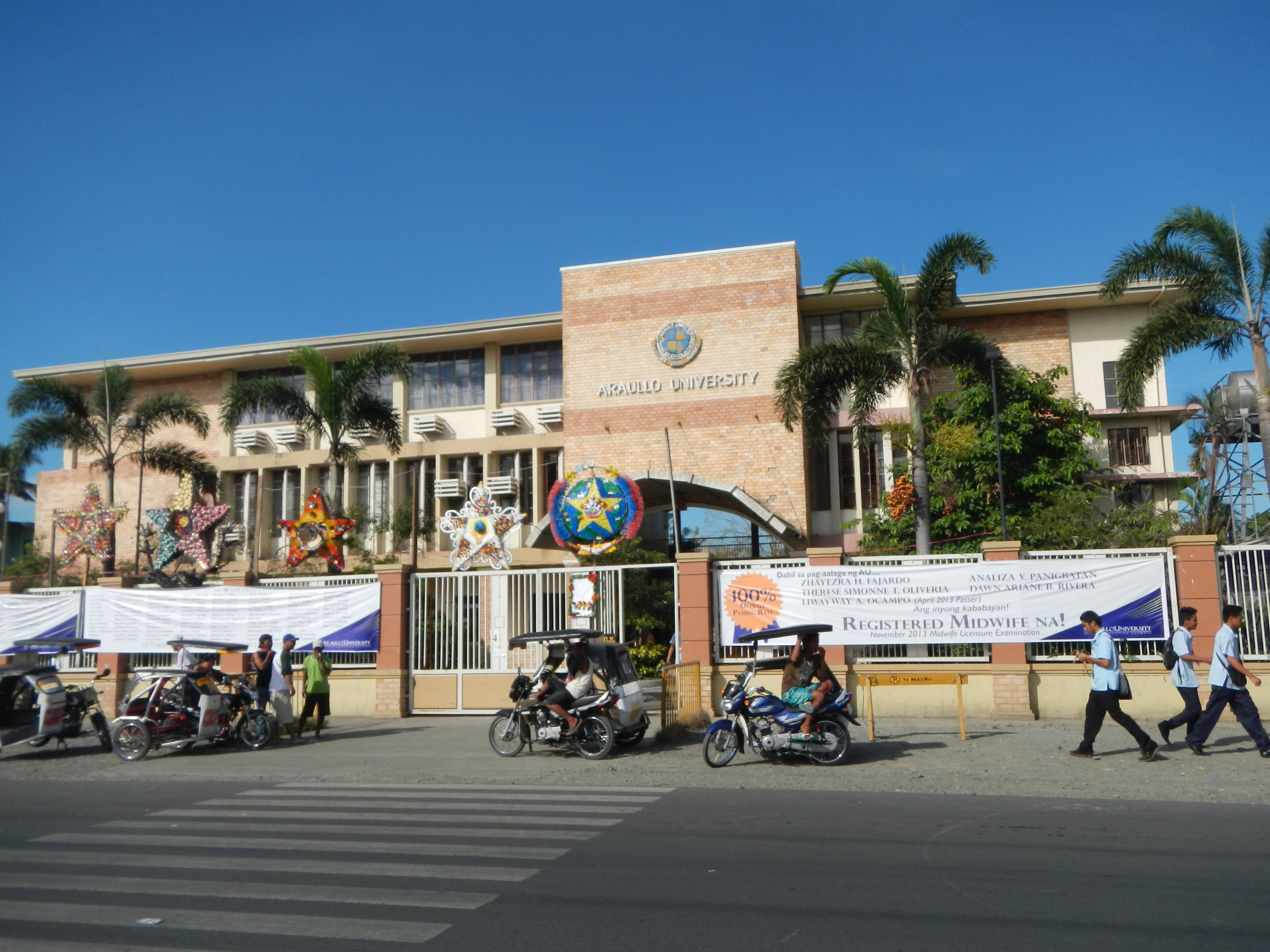

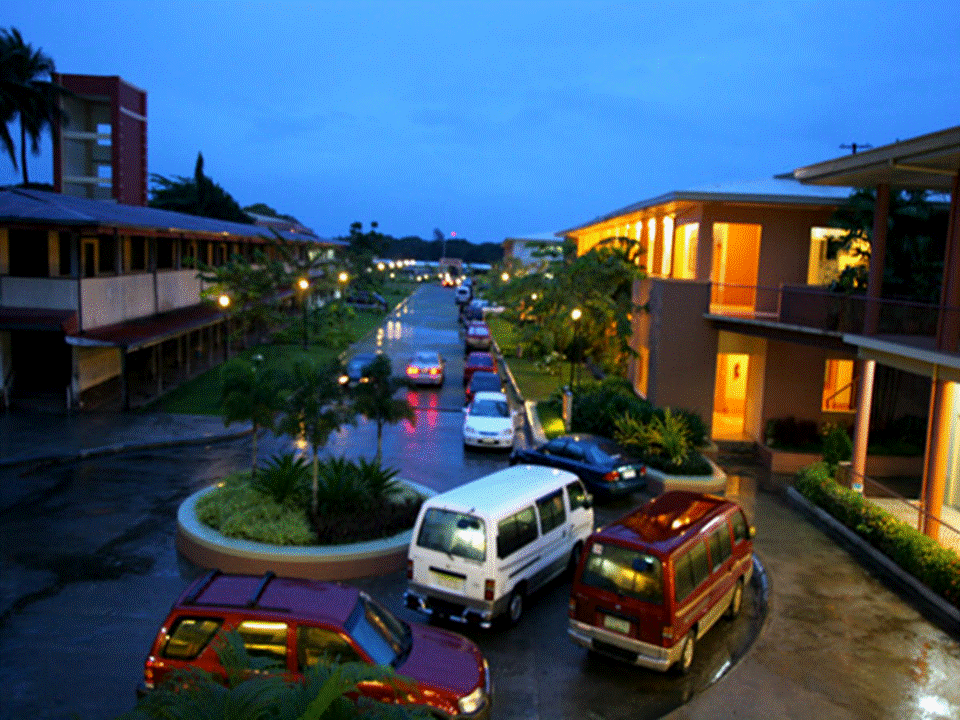

PHINMA - Araullo University (Filipino: Pamantasang Araullo), also referred to by its acronym "AU " or simply "Araullo", is a private, non-sectarian secondary and higher education institution in Cabanatuan, Nueva Ecija, Philippines. It was established in 1950. The university offers a wide range of secondary, undergraduate and graduate programs in its three campuses.

With its acquisition of the University in 2004, Philippine conglomerate PHINMA established the PHINMA Education Network. Together with Cagayan de Oro College (Cagayan de Oro), University of Iloilo (Iloilo City), the University of Pangasinan (Dagupan), Southwestern University (Cebu City), Saint Jude College (Manila) and Republican College (Quezon City), Araullo University forms part of a more than 74,000-strong student community.

Due to its reputation as a leading higher educational institution in the local community, PHINMA AU has been named as "The Largest Private University in Nueva Ecija" as of 2025 and dubbed as one of the four 'Knowledge Eagle Universities of Nueva Ecija'.

PHINMA Education is Southeast Asia's largest private education network, focused on making quality education accessible to underserved communities in the Philippines and Indonesia. Through a network of 10 educational institutions across 15 campuses, the organization aims to provide pathways out of poverty for low-income families.

== History ==
In response to the increasing demand for legal education in Nueva Ecija, the Esteban and Castelo families (some of whom were judges and attorneys) established Araullo Law School, a nonsectarian, co-educational and private law school. It was named after Manuel Araullo, a judge in Nueva Ecija, Pampanga, and Tarlac before becoming the third Chief Justice of the Philippines.

Araullo Law School had an initial batch of 27 students. Classes were first held in the upper floor of the Cabanatuan Puericulture Center. However, as enrollment increased, the law school moved in 1951 to its second campus, a leased premise along M. H. del Pilar Street. In 1963, the League of Provincial Governors proclaimed the law school as the “most outstanding institution in Central Luzon.”

In 1969, the school was transferred to a five-hectare property in Barangay Bitas where it still stands today. Araullo Law School then became a college, known as Araullo Lyceum. It offered diverse courses and improved its facilities. This led the Department of Education, Culture and Sports to grant the institution the university status in 1983, and it subsequently renamed itself as Araullo University.

On April 20, 2004, Araullo University became part of the PHINMA Education Network (PEN), an educational institution that aims to provide quality yet affordable education. Through PHINMA, Araullo University strengthened its academic offerings and employed non-traditional approaches to learning.

PHINMA AU has been ranked number 14 nationwide in the list of schools with 50 or more examinees for Accountants. It produced topnotchers in Criminology Licensure Examination in August 2010 and in April 2016. Likewise, it also produced topnotchers in the Licensure Examination for Teachers (LET) in April 2013.

In 2014, PHINMA AU South opened to cater to students from the southern part of Nueva Ecija. It offers bachelor's degrees in Hotel & Restaurant Management, Tourism Management, Pharmacy, Business Administration major in Banking and Microfinance.

From an enrollment level of only 5,753 students in 2004, PHINMA AU increased to 10,200 students in 2017 with the biggest batch of Senior High School students in the province of Nueva Ecija.

== Recognition and Programs ==
PHINMA AU is dubbed the largest private university in Nueva Ecija because it operates across multiple campuses (including Cabanatuan and San Jose City) and has a long-standing presence in the province. Its acquisition by PHINMA Education in 2004 expanded the institution.

PHINMA Araullo University achieved "back-to-back" top results by becoming the Top 1 Performing School nationwide in the August 2025 Criminology Licensure Exam (CLE) and producing an alumna as the topnotcher in the July 2024 CLE. These accomplishments follow other successes, including producing a Top 9 passer in the September 2024 Licensure Examination for Professional Teachers and a 100% passing rate for first-time takers in the May 2024 Nursing Licensure Examination.

PHINMA Araullo University (PHINMA AU) is the Top 1 Performing School Nationwide for the August 2025 Criminology Licensure Exam (CLE). The university achieved a 92.80% overall passing rate and produced 432 new Registered Criminologists (RCrims), including three topnotchers. PHINMA AU's San Jose campus also achieved a 100% passing rate in the same exam.

=== PHINMA Araullo University Recent Accreditation ===
Under the 2026 PACU-COA accreditation framework, demonstrates continuing institutional engagement in quality assurance through accreditation and program evaluation. Based on the provided accreditation records, the university has programs at different stages of accreditation, ranging from formal accreditation to candidate status.

In Business Administration, the program holds Level II, 3rd Reaccreditation, covering November 2023 to November 2028. Accountancy is listed at Level I Formal Accreditation, with its accreditation period extending from April 2022 to April 2025.

Meanwhile, several programs are identified as Candidate programs. Bachelor of Elementary Education and Bachelor of Secondary Education entered candidate status in June 2026, with coverage through 2028. Liberal Arts is likewise listed as a Candidate program, with the period beginning in August 2023 and extending to 2025.

Overall, the accreditation profile presents PHINMA Araullo University as an institution with programs progressing through different stages of external quality assurance, including a Level II reaccredited program and programs undergoing formal or candidate accreditation. These milestones form an important part of the university's institutional quality-assurance narrative for PACU-COA 2026.

=== PHINMA Araullo University Topnotchers & Achievements ===
- July 2024 Criminologist Licensure Exam: Alyssa Eliana Bautista (1st Place, 92.10% rating).
- May 2024 Nursing Licensure Exam: Shane Irish P. Ortega (7th Place, recognized by CHED RO3).
- September 2024 Licensure Exam for Professional Teachers: Daisy F. Miranda.
- 2024 Overall Performance: PHINMA AU produced 4 topnotchers across various board exams in 2024, maintaining high standards in criminology and education.
- August 2025 Criminology Licensure Exam (CLE): PHINMA AU was recognized as the Top 1 Performing School nationwide, with three topnotchers in the top 10.
- Performance Metrics: The university produced 432 new Registered Criminologists (RCrims) during this cycle.
- Campus Excellence: PHINMA Araullo University - San Jose achieved a 100% passing rate in the same exam.
- Overall Performance: PHINMA Education (including Araullo University) has produced 35 topnotchers across various licensure exams (Nursing, Accountancy, Education, etc.) from June to December 2025.
- PHINMA Araullo University in Cabanatuan City, Region III, solidified its reputation for excellence in 2025, notably producing three topnotchers and 432 new Registered Criminologists in the August 2025 Criminology Licensure Exam (CLE), where it was the top-performing school nationwide. The university also achieved a 100% passing rate at its San Jose campus and maintains a 92.80% overall passing rate in Criminology.
- The Professional Regulation Commission (PRC) released the results of the February 2026 Criminologist Licensure Examination (CLE) on March 13, 2026. According to the official data, PHINMA Araullo University recorded a passing rate of 91.05% for this cycle. Out of the 257 examinees from the institution, 234 successfully passed the exam. This performance placed Araullo University 5th in the category of schools with 200 or more examinees.
- The Professional Regulation Commission (PRC) released the results of the March 2026 Medical Technologists Licensure Examination (MTLE) on March 11, 2026. The examination was conducted across various testing centers, including Manila, Baguio, Cagayan de Oro, Cebu, and Pampanga. Based on preliminary institutional data for the March 2026 cycle, PHINMA Araullo University recorded a passing rate of approximately 82.5% for its first-time takers. This performance follows a period of high activity for the university's board examinees, occurring shortly after the release of the February 2026 Criminologist Licensure Exam results, where the institution ranked 5th nationally.
- From July 2026 onward, has recorded notable achievements across several professional licensure examinations, reflecting strong board performance across its academic programs.
- In the August 2026 Criminologists Licensure Examination (CLE), the university posted an exceptional 98.35% passing rate across its Cabanatuan campuses, while its San Jose City Campus achieved a perfect 100% passing rate. PHINMA Araullo University was also recognized as the Top 1 Performing School Nationwide among institutions with 200 or more examinees. The university produced 354 newly registered criminologists, including three topnotchers, with Eluhim Machucar placing 5th nationwide.
- The university likewise delivered strong results in the August–September 2026 Philippine Nurses Licensure Examination (PNLE), achieving an overall passing rate of 94.15% and producing 177 newly registered nurses. This performance was recognized as the highest passing rate in Nueva Ecija, while Paul Anthony B. De Guzman earned a place among the national board topnotchers.
- Earlier, in the July 2026 Master Plumber Licensure Examination (MPLE), PHINMA Araullo University recorded an 81.82% overall passing rate. Adding to the achievement, Engr. Adam Joshua Dela Cruz ranked 4th nationwide, earning a 90.20% score.

Taken together, these results highlight a strong series of licensure-examination accomplishments for PHINMA Araullo University beginning in July 2026, encompassing Criminology, Nursing, and Master Plumbing, with both high institutional passing rates and national topnotcher placements.

Meanwhile, the CIT (College of Information Technology) department at the PHINMA AU South Campus often features industry-aligned training, including specialized, practical seminars (INNOVATE-IT, ACE IT, TechTalk) covering topics like Business Analytics, CRM Systems, Laravel development and database security.

== Campuses ==
- PHINMA - AU Main Campus (Bitas, Cabanatuan City)
- PHINMA - AU South Campus (H. Concepcion, Cabanatuan City)
- PHINMA - AU San Jose City Campus (Canuto Ramos, San Jose City)

=== Colleges and Departments ===
- College of Arts and Sciences
- College of Engineering
- College of Information Technology
- College of Management and Accountancy
- College of Allied Health Sciences
- College of Education and Liberal Arts
- College of Criminal Justice Education
- School of Graduate and Professional Studies
- Senior High School Department
- Junior High School Department
- Center for Student Development and Leadership
- TESDA Center
- ETEEAP

=== College Programs ===
- Bachelor of Science in Accountancy
- Bachelor of Science in Management Accounting
- Bachelor of Science in Accounting Information System
- Bachelor of Science in Hospitality Management
- Bachelor of Science in Tourism Management
- Bachelor of Science in Entrepreneurship
- Bachelor of Science in Business Administration

(majors below)

1. Marketing Management
2. Banking and Microfinance
3. Financial Management
4. Human Resource Management
- Bachelor of Elementary Education
- Bachelor of Early Childhood Education
- Bachelor of Secondary Education (majors below)
1. Science
2. Mathematics
3. English
4. Filipino
- Bachelor of Science in Electrical Engineering
- Bachelor of Science in Civil Engineering
- Bachelor of Science in Information Technology (majors below)
1. Business Informatics
2. System Development
3. Web Development
4. Digital Arts Animation
5. Computer Security (offered at South campus)
6. Service Culture
- Bachelor of Science in Pharmacy
- Bachelor of Science in Psychology
- Bachelor of Science in Nursing
- Bachelor of Science in Medical Laboratory Science
- Bachelor of Science in Criminology
- Bachelor of Arts in Political Science
- Bachelor of Arts in English Language

=== Basic Education Program ===
College of Education - Laboratory School

1. Junior High School (with Focus in Science, English, Mathematics and Computer Education)
2. Strengthened Senior High School with Specialized Strands
  - ABM Specializes in Hospitality and Tourism
  - Science, Technology, Engineering and Mathematics - STEM
  - Nursing, Pharmacy, Medical Laboratory Science, Psychology - STEM Health
  - Humanities and Social Sciences - HUMSS
  - Criminology - GAS
  - Education - GAS
  - Information Technology - GAS

=== Graduate and Continuing Professional Programs ===
Graduate School

- Doctor of Philosophy
- Master of Science in Business Administration
- Master of Arts with Major in Educational Management
- Master of Arts with Major in Public Management
- Master of Arts with Major in Guidance and Counseling
- Master of Arts with Major in Psychology
- Master of Arts with Major in Mathematics
- Master of Arts with Major in Physical Education
- Master of Arts with Major in Science Education
- Master of Arts with Major in English
- Master of Arts with Major in Filipino

Teaching Certification Program

- 18 Units Teaching Certification Program
- 24 Units Teaching Certification Program

Expanded Tertiary Education Equivalency and Accreditation (ETEEAP)

- Bachelor of Science in Criminology

TESDA Programs

- Bookkeeping NC III
- Events Management NC III
- Contact Center Services NC II
- Microfinance Technology
- Hospitality/Tourism Enhancements: Hotel Housekeeping, Food and Beverage, Bartending, Barista, Baking and Pastry, Front Office, and Basic Culinary.
- Information Technology: Visual Graphic Design NC III

== Sister schools ==
The following are the list of the known PHINMA Education Schools.

- Cagayan de Oro College, Cagayan de Oro, Philippines
- University of Iloilo, Iloilo City, Philippines
- University of Pangasinan, Dagupan, Philippines
- Southwestern University, Cebu City, Philippines
- Horizon University Indonesia
- Universitas Kalbis , Indonesia
