= 2010 Philippine Collegiate Championship =

Men's Finals	G1	G2	G3	Wins
Ateneo Blue Eagles	78	70	73	2
Adamson Soaring Falcons	80	59	67	1
- Duration: December 2–6
- Arena(s): Ninoy Aquino Stadium, PhilSports Arena, Filoil Flying V Arena
- Finals MVP: Nico Salva
- Winning coach: Norman Black
- Semifinalists: De La Salle Green Archers; UC Webmasters
- TV network(s): Studio 23

The 2010 Philippine Collegiate Championship was the third tournament of the Philippine Collegiate Championship (PCC) for basketball in its current incarnation, and the eighth edition overall. The champion teams from the University Athletic Association of the Philippines (UAAP), National Collegiate Athletic Association (NCAA), the Cebu Schools Athletic Foundation, Inc. (CESAFI) and 3 other Metro Manila leagues took part in the final tournament dubbed as the "Sweet Sixteen". Other teams had to qualify in the zonal tournaments to round out the 16 teams in the tournament.

The defending champions Ateneo Blue Eagles defeated the Adamson Soaring Falcons in the championship to make it back-to-back; the De La Salle Green Archers and the UC Webmasters disputed third place, with La Salle winning.

ABS-CBN Sports was the coverage partner, with games airing on Studio 23.

== Tournament format ==
- Top 4 teams from the NCAA, UAAP and the CESAFI finalists qualify automatically to the national quarterfinals.
- Fifth to sixth teams from the NCAA and UAAP qualify to the zonal qualifying games.
- Champions from regional league qualify to the regional championship.
- Best teams from the regional championship qualify for the zonal qualifying games.
- Best seven teams from the zonal qualifying games qualify to the national quarterfinals
- Teams are seeded 1 to 16th at the national quarterfinals in a single elimination format up to the Finals, which is a best-of-3 format, with a playoff for third.

== Qualifying ==
=== Automatic qualifiers ===
Team	League	Elim. round finish	Playoff finish	Qualified as
FEU Tamaraws	UAAP	1st (12-2)	Defeated by Ateneo in the Finals	UAAP runner-up
Ateneo Blue Eagles	UAAP	2nd (10-4)	Defeated FEU in the Finals	UAAP champion
Adamson Soaring Falcons	UAAP	3rd (9-5)	Eliminated by Ateneo in the semifinals	UAAP semifinalist
De La Salle Green Archers	UAAP	4th (8-6)	Eliminated by FEU in the semifinals	UAAP semifinalist
San Beda Red Lions	NCAA	1st (16-0)	Defeated San Sebastian in the Finals	NCAA champion
San Sebastian Stags	NCAA	2nd (13-3)	Defeated by San Beda in the Finals	NCAA runner-up
JRU Heavy Bombers	NCAA	3rd (12-4)	Eliminated by San Sebastian in the semifinals via stepladder	NCAA semifinalist
Mapúa Cardinals	NCAA	4th (9-7)	Eliminated by JRU in the semifinals via stepladder	NCAA semifinalist
UC Webmasters	CESAFI		Defeated UV in the Finals	CESAFI champion
UV Green Lancers	CESAFI		Defeated by U of Cebu in the Finals	CESAFI runner-up

=== Zonal qualifiers ===
Qualified to the Sweet 16

Team	League	Elim. round finish	Playoff finish	Qualified as	Zonal tournament
St. Francis Doves	UCLAAI		Defeated CCP in the Finals	UCLAAI champion	Luzon-MM Interzonals
Lyceum Pirates	ISSA	1st (10-0)	Defeated La Consolacion in the Finals	ISAA champion	Luzon-MM Interzonals
UM Hawks	NAASCU	1st (19-2)	Defeated STI College in the Finals	NAASCU champion	Luzon-MM Interzonals
Sta. Monica Cougars	UCAA	1st (9-1)	Defeated Olivarez College in the Finals	UCAA champion	Luzon-MM Interzonals
UBaguio Cardinals	BBEAL	1st (11-0)	Defeated the U of Cordilleras in the Finals	BBEAL champion	Luzon-MM Interzonals
CCDI Wildcats	BICS	1st (9-0)	Defeated the Lewis College in the Finals	BICS champion	Luzon-MM Interzonals
UPHS Laguna	NCAA South	3rd (6-3)	Defeated Don Bosco in the Finals	NCAA South champion	Luzon-MM Interzonals
NU Bulldogs	UAAP	5th (7-7)	Did not qualify	UAAP fifth place	Luzon-MM Interzonals
UE Red Warriors	UAAP	6th (6-8)	Did not qualify	UAAP sixth place	Luzon-MM Interzonals
Letran Knights	NCAA	5th (7-9)	Did not qualify	NCAA fifth place	Luzon-MM Interzonals
Arellano Chiefs	NCAA	6th (6-10)	Did not qualify	NCAA sixth place	Luzon-MM Interzonals
SBC-A Red Lions	NCAA South	1st (9-0)	Eliminated by UPHS Laguna in the semifinals	NCAA South semifinalist	Luzon-MM Interzonals
U of Iloilo Wildcats	ISSA	1st (7-0)	Defeated USA in the Finals	ISAA champion	VisMin Interzonals
SWU Cobras	CESAFI	3rd (1-2)	Did not qualify	CESAFI third place	VisMin Interzonals
USC Warriors	CESAFI	4th (1-2)	Did not qualify	CESAFI fourth place	VisMin Interzonals
AIFC Sailors	DBL	1st (7-0)	Defeated Ateneo de Davao in the Finals	DBL champion	VisMin Interzonals

== Zonal qualifying ==
Qualified to the Sweet 16

=== Luzon-MM Interzonals ===
Team	W	L	PCT	GB
Letran Knights	2	0	1.000	--
Lyceum Pirates	2	0	1.000	--
NU Bulldogs	2	0	1.000	--
UE Red Warriors	2	0	1.000	--
Arellano Chiefs	1	1	.500	1
St. Francis Doves	1	1	.500	1
Sta. Monica Cougars	1	1	.500	1
UM Hawks	1	1	.500	1
CCDI Wildcats	0	2	.000	2
SBC-A Red Lions	0	2	.000	2
UBaguio Cardinals	0	2	.000	2
UPHS Laguna Saints	0	2	.000	2

November 10

St. Francis Doves	72–63	UBaguio Cardinals

Arellano University Gym, Manila

November 10

Lyceum Pirates	93–55	CCDI Wildcats

Arellano University Gym, Manila

November 10

UM Hawks	65–53	UPHS Laguna Saints

Arellano University Gym, Manila

November 10

Sta. Monica Cougars	93–44	SBC-A Red Lions

Arellano University Gym, Manila

November 11

UBaguio Cardinals	42–76	Letran Knights

Arellano University Gym, Manila

November 11

CCDI Wildcats	80–94	Arellano Chiefs

Arellano University Gym, Manila

November 11

UPHS Laguna Saints	44–80	UE Red Warriors

Arellano University Gym, Manila

November 11

NU Bulldogs	75–57	SBC-A Red Lions

Arellano University Gym, Manila

November 12

UE Red Warriors	100–74	UM Hawks

Arellano University Gym, Manila

November 12

Letran Knights	66–61	St. Francis Doves

Arellano University Gym, Manila

November 12

Sta. Monica Cougars	61–69	NU Bulldogs

Arellano University Gym, Manila

November 12

Arellano Chiefs	65–68	Lyceum Pirates

Arellano University Gym, Manila

=== VisMin Interzonals ===
Team	W	L	PCT	GB	Tie
USC Warriors	3	0	1.000	--	
U of Iloilo Wildcats	1	2	.333	2	1.014
AIFC Sailors	1	2	.333	2	1.013
SWU Cobras	1	2	.333	2	0.975

November 14

SWU Cobras	71–62	AIFC Sailors

Cebu City Coliseum, Cebu City

November 14

USC Warriors	87–74	U of Iloilo Wildcats

Cebu City Coliseum, Cebu City

November 15

U of Iloilo Wildcats	74–84	AIFC Sailors

Cebu City Coliseum, Cebu City

November 15

SWU Cobras	53–57	USC Warriors

Cebu City Coliseum, Cebu City

November 16

SWU Cobras	67–83	U of Iloilo Wildcats

Cebu City Coliseum, Cebu City

November 16

USC Warriors	83–81	AIFC Sailors

Cebu City Coliseum, Cebu City

== Bracket ==
Round of 16
November 23 – Filoil Flying V Arena
Ateneo	76
Lyceum	66
November 22 – Filoil Flying V Arena
Mapua	74
NU	61
November 18 – Cebu Coliseum
U of Cebu	96
U of Iloilo	66
November 18 – Cebu Coliseum
UV	64
USC	71
November 25 – Filoil Flying V Arena
San Beda	86
UE	64
November 22 – Filoil Flying V Arena
La Salle	70
Letran	56
November 19 – Cebu Coliseum
FEU	64
JRU	60
November 23 – Filoil Flying V Arena
San Sebastian	54
Adamson	65

Quarter-finals
November 25 – Filoil Flying V Arena
Ateneo	65
Mapua	56
November 19 – Cebu Coliseum
U of Cebu	83
USC	67
November 29 – Filoil Flying V Arena
San Beda	74
La Salle	84
November 29 – Filoil Flying V Arena
FEU	57
Adamson	75

Semi-finals
November 30 – Filoil Flying V Arena
Ateneo	74
U of Cebu	54
November 30 - Filoil Flying V Arena
La Salle	59
Adamson	67

Best-of-3 Finals
December 2–6 - ULTRA
Ateneo	2
Adamson	1
Third place
December 2 - Ninoy Aquino Stadium
U of Cebu	71
La Salle	82

== Finals ==
The Finals is a best-of-3 series. The team that wins two games first is named the champion.

December 2

Ateneo Blue Eagles	78–80	Adamson Soaring Falcons

Ninoy Aquino Stadium, Manila

December 5

Ateneo Blue Eagles	70–59	Adamson Soaring Falcons

ULTRA, Pasig

December 6

Ateneo Blue Eagles	73–67	Adamson Soaring Falcons
Ateneo wins series 2-1

Filoil Flying V Arena, San Juan City

== Awards ==
The awardees are:

- Most Valuable Player: Nico Salva (Ateneo)
- Mythical Five:
  - Nico Salva (Ateneo)
  - Kirk Long (Ateneo)
  - Lester Alvarez (Adamson)
  - Alex Nuyles (Adamson)
  - June Mar Fajardo (U of Cebu)
- Best Coach: Norman Black (Ateneo)
- Best Referee: Meynard Bellecer
- Special Individual and Team Awards:
  - National Collegiate Player of the Year: June Mar Fajardo (U of Cebu)
  - Motivator of the Year Award: Atty. Baldomero Estenzo (U of Cebu)
  - Fortitude Award: National University Bulldogs
  - Breakthrough Performance Award: University of Iloilo Wildcats
  - Grinder Award: Lyceum Pirates
  - Comeback Award: De La Salle Green Archers
  - Great Leap Forward Award: Adamson Soaring Falcons

== Juniors' tournament ==
This tournament was added only in 2010. The runners-up of the NCAA and UAAP will battle for the third spot while the champion of each league will battle for the top spot.

=== Battle for third ===
December 2

UST Tiger Cubs	74–68	SSC-R Staglets

Ninoy Aquino Stadium, Manila

=== Championship ===
December 5

Ateneo Blue Eaglets	87–85	San Beda Red Cubs

ULTRA, Pasig

Preceded by 2009	Philippine Collegiate Championship; 2010	Succeeded by 2011
