= Philippine Collegiate Champions League =

Basketball championship league

- Sport: Basketball
- Founded: 2003
- Folded: 2020
- No. of teams: 8 (Finals); ~250 (Qualifying)
- Country: Philippines
- Last champion: Ateneo Blue Eagles (5)
- Most titles: La Salle (9)
- Broadcasters: none (via livestreaming through PCCL's Facebook and YouTube accounts)
- Related competitions: CESAFI, ISAA, ISSA, NAASCU, NCAA, NCAA South, NCRAA, NOPSSCEA, PRISAA, SCUAA, UAAP, UCAA, UCLAA, BBEAL, BBL, COSAA, DPSAA, DCIBL, LUSCAA, QPSBA
- Website: CollegiateChampionsLeague.net

The Philippine Collegiate Champions League (PCCL) was a national collegiate basketball championship league in the Philippines. Its tournament, known as the "National Collegiate Championship" (NCC) is sanctioned by the Samahang Basketbol ng Pilipinas, the country's national basketball federation. The league's format varies every season with 250 teams coming from nine different regional areas nationwide.

== History ==
It was originally established in 2002 as the Collegiate Champions League (CCL). Reynaldo Gamboa, former Philippine Basketball Association (PBA) chairman and team governor for the Shell Turbo Chargers was named as the chairman of the tournament, while former national coach Joe Lipa served as the tournament director and commissioner. In 2008, the national governing body of basketball in the Philippines, the Samahang Basketbol ng Pilipinas (SBP) sanctioned the CCL and was renamed into the Philippine Collegiate Champions League in which the organizers of the old CCL were retained.

So then, teams from the UAAP had dominated the tournament, winning ten (10) out of the twelve (12) championships contested, with the remainder being won by teams from the NCAA. UAAP and NCAA teams are given four, and the CESAFI one, outright slots in the round of 16 berths. No UAAP champion vs. NCAA champion meeting took place in the finals, although a finals between the UAAP champion and the NCAA runner-up was contested in 2003 (FEU vs. San Sebastian), 2011 (Ateneo vs. San Sebastian)and 2019 (Ateneo vs. San Beda), UAAP and CESAFI champions contested the finals in 2018, and both finalists in the UAAP contested the 2008 and 2012 championship while NCAA finalists would later contested in 2018.

In 2002, 2003, 2009, 2010, 2012, 2013 and 2014, the Finals were played in a best-of-3 series; the others were one-off games (2004–2008); no third-place game was held on the first two tournaments. The contest was not held in 2005. In 2011, the single round robin Final Four match-up was introduced with the team with the most wins will have a twice-to-beat incentive in the Finals. However, in 2012, it was changed to whichever team to first get two (2) wins will automatically advanced to the Finals with the Finals without any incentives and with the Finals being played in a best-of-three series.

Due to time constraints, the championship of the 2015 tournament was cancelled. Instead, the winners of the semifinal round were declared as co-champions.

There was no tournament held in 2016 due to the changes adopted in the UAAP calendar.

The national championship returned in 2017 and adopted an elite-eight tournament format. The top two teams from UAAP and NCAA, together with the CESAFI champion were seeded automatically. The three remaining slots were given to the champions of the Luzon, NCR and Mindanao regional tournaments.

In 2018, changes in the tournament format were made to give provincial teams a fair chance to be in the championship round. The champions of UAAP and NCAA were placed in a separate group while the rest of the qualified teams, including the CESAFI champion will be placed in a separate tournament group that will first determine the champions for North Luzon, South Luzon, Visayas and Mindanao. The eventual winner of this group will face-off with the winner of the UAAP/NCAA group to determine the national champion.

From 2017 to 2018, the PCCL held its 3x3 basketball tournament, in parallel to its regular national championship. The PCCL's version of its 3x3 tournament has similar rules with the BIG3 tournament. Regional 3x3 tournaments were held in North and South Luzon, Visayas and Mindanao. In 2018, the official FIBA 3x3 rules were followed.

== Tournament results ==
=== 5-on-5 ===
==== Per tournament ====
Season	Finals			Third-place game			Most Valuable Player
Season	Champion	Scores	Runners-up	Third place	Scores	Fourth place	Most Valuable Player
2003	UE Red Warriors (UAAP)	82–58; 57–55	FEU Tamaraws (UAAP)	UST Growling Tigers (UAAP)	No third place game		Not awarded
2004	FEU Tamaraws (UAAP)	81–77; 89–81	San Sebastian Stags (NCAA)	Ateneo Blue Eagles (UAAP); St. Francis Doves (NCRAA/UCAA)	No third place game		Not awarded
2005	FEU Tamaraws (UAAP)	69–49	UE Red Warriors (UAAP)	UV Green Lancers (CESAFI)	65–64	PCU Dolphins (NCAA)	Not awarded
2006	UE Red Warriors (UAAP)	66–59	San Beda Red Lions (NCAA)	JRU Heavy Bombers (NCAA)	76–72	Mapúa Cardinals (NCAA)	Not awarded
2007	Ateneo Blue Eagles (UAAP)	71–54	UV Green Lancers (CESAFI)	STI Olympians (NAASCU)	87–81 (OT)	UST Growling Tigers (UAAP)	Not awarded
2008	De La Salle Green Archers (UAAP)	71–62	Ateneo Blue Eagles (UAAP)	Letran Knights (NCAA)	75–67	San Beda Red Lions (NCAA)	JVee Casio (La Salle)
2009	Ateneo Blue Eagles (UAAP)	70–75; 90–63; 74–70	FEU Tamaraws (UAAP)	San Beda Red Lions (NCAA)	91–85	San Sebastian Stags (NCAA)	Jai Reyes (Ateneo)
2010	Ateneo Blue Eagles (UAAP)	78–80; 70–59; 73–67	Adamson Soaring Falcons (UAAP)	De La Salle Green Archers (UAAP)	82–71	UC Webmasters (CESAFI)	Nico Salva (Ateneo)
2011	San Sebastian Stags (NCAA)	51–56; 73–67	Ateneo Blue Eagles (UAAP)	San Beda Red Lions (NCAA)	82–69	UC Webmasters (CESAFI)	Ian Sangalang (San Sebastian)
2012	UST Growling Tigers (UAAP)	82–76; 69–70; 81–76	Ateneo Blue Eagles (UAAP)	San Beda Red Lions (NCAA)	64–56	SWU Cobras (CESAFI)	Jeric Teng (UST)
2013	De La Salle Green Archers (UAAP)	64–54; 70–61	SWU Cobras (CESAFI)	FEU Tamaraws (UAAP)	(Note: No third place game in 2013. FEU was declared as the second runner-up over SBC due to the win-over-the-other rule.)	San Beda Red Lions (NCAA)	Jeron Teng (La Salle)
2014	San Beda Red Lions (NCAA)	88–81; 73–66	De La Salle Green Archers (UAAP)	UV Green Lancers (CESAFI)	63–60	USC Warriors (CESAFI)	Ola Adeogun (San Beda)
2015	San Beda Red Lions (NCAA); FEU Tamaraws (UAAP)	Co-champions (Note: In 2015, it was announced that two winners of the semifinals matches will be the co-champions of the tournament. The supposed finals title match was cancelled due to Typhoon Nona. Both FEU and San Beda are co-champions for this tournament.)		Letran Knights (NCAA); USC Warriors (CESAFI)	Joint runners-up		Ken Holmqvist (FEU)
2016	No tournament held			No tournament held			No tournament held
2017	Lyceum Pirates (NCAA)	70–66	San Beda Red Lions (NCAA)	No third placer			Jaycee Marcelino (Lyceum)
2018	Ateneo Blue Eagles (UAAP)	95–71	UV Green Lancers (CESAFI)	No third placer			Isaac Go (Ateneo)
2019	Ateneo Blue Eagles (UAAP)	57–46	San Beda Red Lions (NCAA)	UV Green Lancers (CESAFI)	93–63	UP Fighting Maroons (UAAP)	SJ Belangel (Ateneo)
2020	Canceled			Canceled			none
2021	No tournament held			No tournament held			No tournament held
2022	No tournament held			No tournament held			No tournament held

==== Medal table ====
Rank	Team	Gold	Silver	Bronze	Total
1	Ateneo Blue Eagles	5	3	1	9
2	FEU Tamaraws	3	2	1	6
3	San Beda Red Lions	2	3	3	8
4	De La Salle Green Archers	2	1	1	4
5	UE Red Warriors	2	1	0	3
6	San Sebastian Stags	1	1	0	2
7	UST Growling Tigers	1	0	1	2
8	Lyceum Pirates	1	0	0	1
9	Adamson Soaring Falcons	0	1	0	1
9	SWU Cobras	0	1	0	1
11	Letran Knights	0	0	2	2
12	JRU Heavy Bombers	0	0	1	1
12	SFAC Doves	0	0	1	1
12	STI Olympians	0	0	1	1
12	USC Warriors	0	0	1	1
Totals (15 entries)		17	13	13	43

==== Per league ====
- UAAP — 13
- NCAA — 4

==== Regional champions ====
Year	Luzon	VisMin/Southern Islands
2010	Letran Knights Lyceum Pirates NU Bulldogs UE Red Warriors	USC Warriors UI Wildcats
2011	San Sebastian Stags	UC Webmasters
2013	FEU Tamaraws	SWU Cobras
2014	De La Salle Green Archers	UV Green Lancers

Year	North/Central Luzon	NCR	South Luzon/Bicol	Visayas	Mindanao
2011	U-Pang Flames	De La Salle Green Archers NU Bulldogs	UB Brahmans	AMA Ormoc Titans	STI-CDO Olympians
2017	LNU Dukes	San Sebastian Stags	NCF Tigers	n/a	HTC GenSan Wildcats
2018	DHVTSU Wildcats	Letran Knights	NCF Tigers	CSAV Titans	HTC GenSan Wildcats
2019	DHVTSU Wildcats	Diliman Blue Dragons	Annunciation Panthers	AC Lightnings	HTC GenSan Wildcats

=== 3x3 ===
Year	Champion	Score	Runner-up	Third place
2017	Arellano (NCAA)	42–24	Fatima (NAASCU)	UV (CESAFI)
2018	Holy Child College of Davao	2–0 (best-of-three)	La Finns Scholastica	UNC

== Results from 2004 to 2007 ==
=== 2004–05 CCL ===
The third season of the CCL began on February 11, 2005, with Philippine Basketball League's Chino Trinidad as the Commissioner.

==== Participating teams ====
Seeded at	Team	League	Notes	Eliminated at
Semifinals	Philippine Christian University Dolphins	NCAA	NCAA champion	Semifinals (Eliminated by UE)
Quarterfinals	Far Eastern University Tamaraws	UAAP	UAAP champion	Champions (Finals vs. UE)
Quarterfinals	University of the Visayas Green Lancers	CESAFI	CESAFI champion	Semifinals (Eliminated by FEU)
Quarterfinals	University of Perpetual Help Rizal Altas	NCAA	NCAA runner-up	Quarterfinals (Eliminated by UE)
Third Round	Ateneo de Manila University Blue Eagles	UAAP	UAAP 3rd place	Third Round (Eliminated by UP)
Second Round	Colegio de San Juan de Letran Knights	NCAA	NCAA 3rd place	Second Round (Eliminated by UP)
Second Round	University of the East Red Warriors	UAAP	UAAP 4th place	Finals (Defeated by FEU)
Second Round	University of San Jose - Recoletos Jaguars	CESAFI	CESAFI runner-up	Second Round (Eliminated by UC)
Unseeded	University of the Philippines Fighting Maroons	UAAP	UAAP 5th place	Quarterfinals (Eliminated by FEU)
Unseeded	University of Southern Philippines Panthers	CESAFI	CESAFI 3rd place	First Round (Eliminated by UMindanao)
Unseeded	West Negros College Mustangs	NOPSSCEA	NOPSSCEA champion	First Round (Eliminated by UC)
Unseeded	San Beda College Red Lions	NCAA	NCAA 4th place	Second Round (Eliminated by UE)
Unseeded	Emilio Aguinaldo College Generals	UCAA	UCAA champion	First Round (Eliminated by UP)
Unseeded	University of Mindanao Wildcats	Davao PRISAA	Davao PRISAA Champion	Quarterfinals (Eliminated by UV)
Unseeded	University of Cebu Webmasters	CESAFI	CESAFI 4th place	Third Round (Eliminated by UP)
Unseeded	University of Manila Hawks	NAASCU	NAASCU champion	First Round (Eliminated by San Beda)

==== Bracket ====
First round
February 11/13
EAC	55
UP	78
February 11/13
U of Mindanao	93
USP	74
February 11/13
UC	109
WNC	83
February 11/13
UM	79
San Beda	85

Second round
February 15/17
Letran	41
UP	52
February 15/17
USJ–R	70
UC	81
February 15/17
UE	70
San Beda	55

Third round
February 19
UP	77
Ateneo	55
February 19
UC	69
UE	78

Quarterfinals
February 15/22
UP	56
FEU	78
February 15/22
U of Mindanao	74
UV	84
February 15/22
UE	71
Perpetual	59

Semifinals
February 24
FEU	85
UV	71
February 24
UE	72
PCU	67

Finals
February 27
FEU	69
UE	49
Third place
February 27
UV	65
PCU	64

2005 PCCL champions

Second title

=== 2006–07 CCL ===
The 4th Collegiate Champions League began on October 5, 2006

==== Participating teams ====
Seed	Team	League	Notes	Eliminated at
1	Ateneo de Manila University Blue Eagles	UAAP	UAAP runner-up	Quarterfinals (eliminated by Mapúa)
2	San Beda College Red Lions	NCAA	NCAA champion	Finals (defeated by UE)
3	University of Santo Tomas Growling Tigers	UAAP	UAAP champion	Round of 16 (eliminated by JRU)
4	Philippine Christian University Dolphins	NCAA	NCAA runner-up	Quarterfinals (eliminated by UE)
5	University of the East Red Warriors	UAAP	UAAP 3rd place	Champions (Finals vs. San Beda)
6	Colegio de San Juan de Letran Knights	NCAA	NCAA 3rd place	Quarterfinals (eliminated by JRU)
7	Adamson University Soaring Falcons	UAAP	UAAP 4th place	Round of 16 (eliminated by UV)
8	Mapua Institute of Technology Cardinals	NCAA	NCAA 4th place	Semifinals (eliminated by UE)
9	Saint Francis of Assisi College System Doves	NCRAA	NCRAA champion	Round of 16 (eliminated by Mapúa)
10	University of the Visayas Green Lancers	CESAFI	Visayas-Mindanao qualifier	Quarterfinals (eliminated by San Beda)
11	University of Cebu Webmasters	CESAFI	Visayas-Mindanao qualifier	Round of 16 (eliminated by Letran)
12	Emilio Aguinaldo College Generals	UCAA	UCAA champion	Round of 16 (eliminated by UE)
13	AMA Computer University Titans	NAASCU	NAASCU champion	Round of 16 (eliminated by PCU)
14	José Rizal University Heavy Bombers	NCAA	NCAA 6th place - Wildcard	Semifinals (eliminated by San Beda)
15	National University Bulldogs	UAAP	UAAP 7th place - Wildcard	Round of 16 (eliminated by San Beda)
16	PMI Colleges Admirals	CUSA	CUSA champion - Wildcard	Round of 16 (eliminated by Ateneo)

==== Bracket ====
Round of 16
October 6 — Blue Eagle Gym
Ateneo	87
PMI	73
October 5 — EAC Gym
Mapúa	77
St. Francis	60
October 10 — St. Placid's Gym
PCU	95
AMACU	88
October 5 — EAC Gym
UE	84
EAC	60
October 10 — St. Placid's Gym
San Beda	75
NU	72
October 9 — UST Gym
Adamson	67
UV	70
October 9 — UST Gym
UST	63
JRU	65
October 6 — Blue Eagle Gym
Letran	81
UC	71

Quarter-finals
October 14 — Rizal Coliseum
Ateneo	66
Mapúa	70
October 13 — Rizal Coliseum
PCU	55
UE	74
October 13 — Rizal Coliseum
San Beda	84
UV	68
October 14 — Rizal Coliseum
JRU	64
Letran	58

Semi-finals
October 19 — Rizal Coliseum
Mapúa	73
UE	84
October 19 — Rizal Coliseum
San Beda	61
JRU	58

Final
October 22 — Rizal Coliseum
UE	66
San Beda	59
Third place
October 22 — Rizal Coliseum
Mapúa	72
JRU	76

2006 PCCL champions

Second title

===== Visayas–Mindanao qualifying series =====
All games were held at the Cebu Coliseum in Cebu City.

Semi-finals
2 WNC	L
3 UC	W

Final
2 UC	93
1 USC	90

Semi-finals
2 USJ–R	L
3 UMin	W

Final
3 UMin	68
1 UV	83

=== 2007–08 CCL ===
The 5th Collegiate Champions League started on November 10, 2007.

==== Participating teams ====
Seed	Team	League	Notes	Eliminated at
1	De La Salle University-Manila Green Archers	UAAP	UAAP champion	Round of 16 (Forfeit)
2	San Beda College Red Lions	NCAA	NCAA champion	Quarterfinals (Eliminated by UST)
3	Ateneo de Manila University Blue Eagles	UAAP	UAAP 3rd place Unigames runner-up	Champions (Finals vs. UV)
4	University of the East Red Warriors	UAAP	UAAP runner-up	Round of 16 (Forfeit)
5	Far Eastern University Tamaraws	UAAP	UAAP 5th place Unigames champion - Wildcard	Quarterfinals (Eliminated by STI)
6	José Rizal University Heavy Bombers	NCAA	NCAA 3rd place	Quarterfinals (Eliminated by Ateneo de Manila)
7	University of Santo Tomas Growling Tigers	UAAP	UAAP 4th place	Semi-finals (Eliminated by Ateneo de Manila)
8	University of the Visayas Green Lancers	CESAFI	CESAFI champion	Finals (Defeated by Ateneo de Manila)
9	Lyceum of the Philippines University Pirates	WNCAA	WNCAA champion	Round of 16 (Eliminated by UV)
10	Mapúa Institute of Technology Cardinals	NCAA	NCAA 4th place	Round of 16 (Eliminated by UST)
11	West Negros College Mustangs	NOPSSCEA	NOPSSCEA champion Unigames 3rd Place	Round of 16 (Eliminated by JRU)
12	Manuel L. Quezon University Stallions	CUSA	CUSA champion	Round of 16 (Eliminated by FEU)
13	STI College Olympians	NAASCU	NAASCU champion	Semi-finals (Eliminated by UV)
14	San Sebastian College - Recoletos Stags	NCAA	NCAA 5th place	Round of 16 (Eliminated by Ateneo de Manila)
15	Sacred Heart College Stallions	TCCL	TCCL champion	Round of 16 (eliminated by San Beda)
16	University of Mindanao Wildcats	DCAA	DCAA champion	Quarterfinals (Eliminated by UV)

==== Bracket ====
Round of 16
November 15 - The Arena
La Salle	Declined
UMin	Default
November 17 - The Arena
UV	101
Lyceum	80
November 14 - Blue Eagle Gym
UE	Forfeit
STI	Default
November 10 - The Arena
FEU	91
MLQU	80
November 12 - St. Placid's Gym
San Beda	105
Sacred Heart	48
November 12 - St. Placid's Gym
UST	91
Mapúa	90
November 14 - Blue Eagle Gym
Ateneo	78
San Sebastian	51
November 13 - N. Aquino Stadium
JRU	83
WNC	61

Quarter-finals
November 19 - The Arena
UMin	58
UV	78
November 21 - The Arena
STI	77
FEU	72
November 19 - The Arena
San Beda	84
UST	88
November 21 - The Arena
Ateneo	81
JRU	71

Semi-finals
November 26 - The Arena
UV	80
STI	71
November 26 - The Arena
UST	66
Ateneo	92

Final
November 28 - The Arena
UV	54
Ateneo	71
Third place
November 28 - The Arena
STI	87
UST (OT)	81

2007 Champion
Ateneo
First title

== Media ==
- National Broadcasting Network (2002–2003)
- Solar Sports (2004–2008)
- ABS-CBN Sports (2009–2015)
  - Studio 23 (2009–2013)
  - ABS-CBN Sports and Action (2014–2015)
- Basketball TV (2017)
- ESPN 5 (5 Plus) (2018)
- Livestreaming through PCCL's official Facebook and YouTube accounts (2019–2020)

== See also ==
- College basketball in the Philippines
- List of Philippine men's collegiate basketball champions
- National Students' Basketball Championship, similar tournament held by the Basketball Association of the Philippines
