= University of Iloilo =

Private university in Iloilo City, Philippines

- Pamantasan ng Iloilo (Filipino)
- Former names: Iloilo City Colleges (1947-1968)
- Motto: Excelsior (Latin)
- Motto in English: Ever upward
- Type: Private Non-Sectarian Coeducational basic and higher education institution
- Established: 1947; 79 years ago
- Founder: Fernando Lopez
- President: Raymundo P. Reyes, ECE; Ed.D.
- Students: 25,966
- Location: Iloilo City, Iloilo, Philippines; 10°41′30″N 122°34′11″E
- Campus: Urban
- Hymn: "UI Hymn"
- Newspaper: UI Star Publication
- Colors: Dark green and Gold
- Nickname: North Stars
- Mascot: Percy
- Athletic association: PRISAA, ISSAA
- Website: ui.phinma.edu.ph
- Location in the Visayas Location in the Philippines

The PHINMA – University of Iloilo (colloquially referred simply to as UI) is a private, nonsectarian, coeducational institution in Iloilo City, Philippines. It was established in 1947 by the López family of Iloilo who founded the broadcasting giant ABS-CBN Corporation as Iloilo City Colleges. The university was later acquired by the business conglomerate group PHINMA Industries, and its current operations and management is controlled by the said company under its arm, PHINMA Education Network.

The university offers basic education, undergraduate and graduate academic programs in Business and Accountancy, Information Technology, Maritime Engineering, Engineering Sciences, Teacher Education, Pharmacy, Psychology, Nursing, Hospitality, Tourism, and Criminology.

The Medical City-Iloilo is the university's affiliated hospital for the clinical training of its nursing and pharmacy students.

== History ==
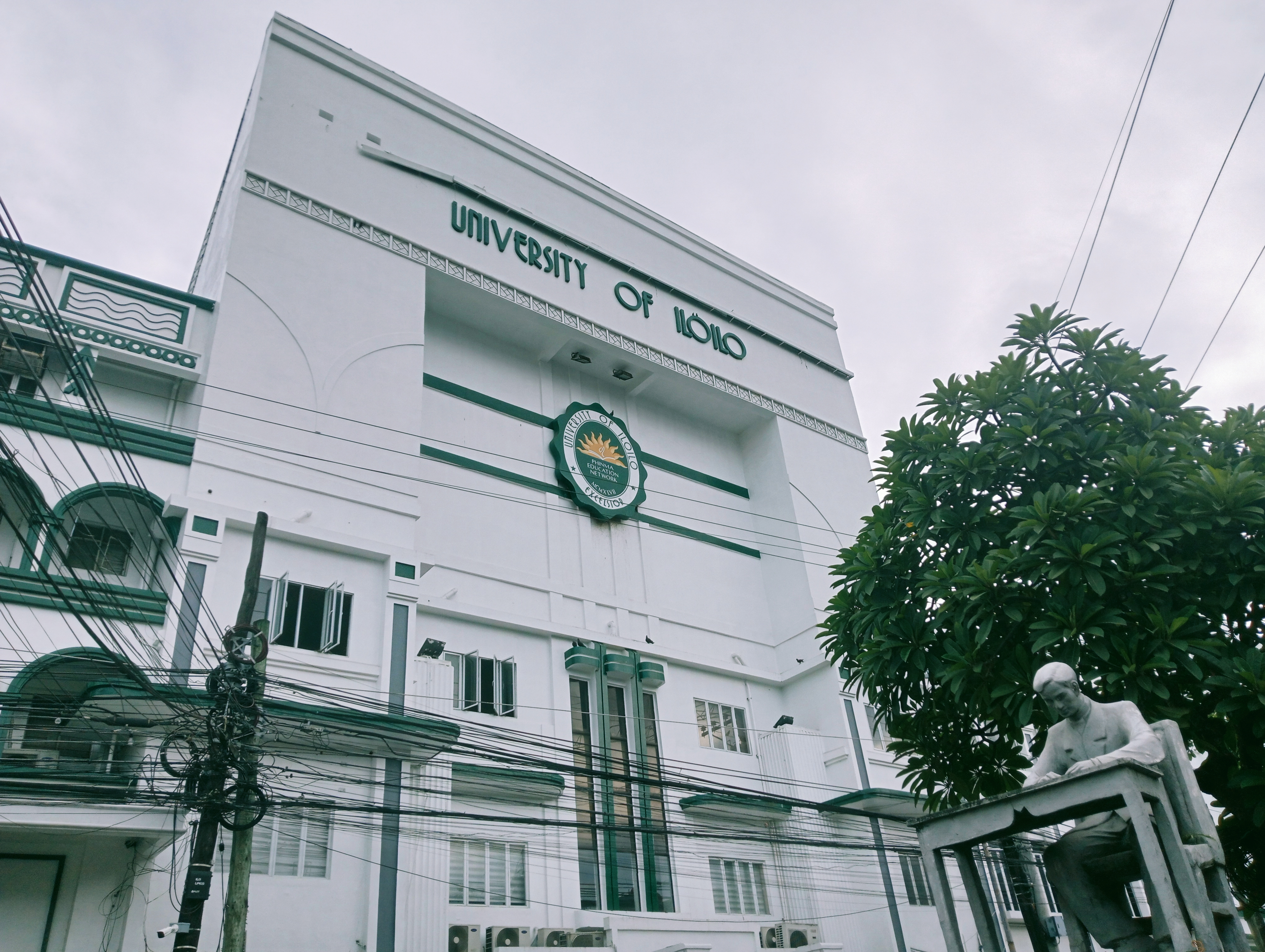
University of Iloilo Main Building

The University of Iloilo started as the Iloilo City Colleges (ICC). It was established in June 1947 by the Hon. Fernando H. Lopez, past Vice President of the Philippines and then mayor of Iloilo City, who said that he was inspired by his wife Doña Mariquit and his brother Don Eugenio. Joining him were professionals and educators who shared in his vision of putting up a school for the poor and the middle class.

The first classes were held in makeshift buildings - quonset huts with nipa roofs, sawali and bamboo walls, and mud floors, as the country had just come out of World War II. There were two campuses: the Iloilo Unit, which housed the Colleges of Dentistry, Pharmacy, Commerce, Liberal Arts, Law and the High School Department; and the La Paz Unit where the Colleges of Normal Education, Engineering, and the High School and Elementary Departments were located. Dr. Gabino Tabuñar served as the first President of the Iloilo City Colleges. Upon his resignation in 1954, Hon. Lopez, assumed the Presidency with Jose Jimoga-on, Sr. as controller and Miss Loreto J. Ledesma as Administrative Officer.

Over the next few years the school changed its course offerings and replaced dilapidated buildings. First to be constructed was the Don Benito Lopez Building, followed by the Don Fernando Lopez Hall as an annex to Doña Presentacion Lopez Building, which would be occupied by the Basic Education Department. In the main campus were erected the Doña Mariquit Lopez Building and the Don Eugenio Lopez Building. The Queen Theater in the latter was renovated to accommodate the University Auditorium on the second floor and the College of Law Library on the ground floor. The College of Law Building was constructed on the corner of Rizal and Iznart Streets, with the ground floor becoming the University Chapel. Across the High School Department, on the corner of Mapa and Rizal Streets, rose the Doña Pacita Building.

In 1963, the Iloilo City colleges opened its Graduate School for the professional growth of teachers and administrators. Three years later the speech laboratories were put up for the undergraduate and the graduate language classes. In 1966, the College of Agriculture was opened at Ungka, Pavia. Simultaneously, the College of Criminal Justice was opened in the main campus. The College of Agriculture was later phased out due to the decline in enrolment. On December 17, 1968, Iloilo City Colleges was granted the university status and became the 32nd university in the Philippines. In 1971, the university closed the doors of its high school in La Paz, commonly known as the University of Iloilo, La Paz Unit.

In 1972, the University Administration purchased the Philippine Women’s College in Jaro. This was converted into the Don Benito Lopez Hospital. In the main campus two buildings were later constructed to accommodate the initial enrollment for the College of Nursing. Courses like the Bachelor of Science in Nutrition and the Bachelor of Science in Social Work, which were then offered by the Philippine Women’s College, were transferred to the main campus. These courses and the Bachelor of Science in Psychology, which was offered in 1974, were included in the course offerings in the College of Arts and Sciences. The expansion of the College of Arts and Sciences led to the construction of the Science Building.

In June 1989, a three-story building was constructed behind the mini-park, connecting the Don Eugenio Lopez Building to the Don Benito Lopez Building. In 1991, the Department of Education, Culture, and Sports acknowledged the University of Iloilo as an Excellent School for the College of Criminology, now the College of Criminal Justice. In March 1993, a certificate of recognition was awarded to the College of Criminology.

During the Academic year 1993-1994, the College of Education opened the Pre-School Education Program while the College of Arts and Sciences offered Mass Communication as another major in the Bachelor of Arts Program. The university mini-radio station was then constructed for the training of students majoring in Mass Communication.

On May 26, 1993, upon the death of Don Fernando, Hon. Alberto J. Lopez took over as President of the university. On June 25, 1993, a month after the death of Don Fernando Lopez, the FHL Museum dedicated to his memory, was inaugurated. This became part of the University‘s Learning Resource Center. In the same year, the Ungka Campus became the site of the Marine Engineering classrooms. On September 1, 1993, the Colleges of Law, Arts and Sciences, and Education were granted Level II accreditation status by the PAASCU. In June 1994, the University of Iloilo Graduate School offered the Master in Business Administration. In 1998, the University of Iloilo Graduate School was granted CHED recognition for its Master in Public Administration Program. In May 1999, the BS Marine Engineering of the College of Engineering passed the CHED evaluation for Maritime Education program.

In AY 2000-2001, the College of Engineering program was awarded the Certificate of Compliance with the requirements set forth by ISO 9002:1994 by the ABS Quality Evaluation Incorporated, applicable to the “Provision of Maritime Education in accordance with CHED Rules and STCW ’95 Convention.” In August 2005, the B.S. Marine Engineering program was granted government recognition.

The University created a Community Extension Program through its Community Extension Services Center (CESC), which would hold educational assistance, training, livelihood and environmental projects, tutorial services, and values-oriented classes. It later increased its community partners from two barangays to seven and adopted three schools. The CESC partnered with the ERDA Foundation, Department of Education, Bureau of Nonformal Education, the City Planning Office, ERDA-UNICEF, Australian Aid (AUSAID), the International Marinelife Alliance, and became a member of the Iloilo City Task Force on Child Labor.

In the second semester of AY 2002-2003, the College of Criminology launched the BS in Criminology-ETEEAP (Expanded Tertiary Education Equivalency and Accreditation Program) as a CHED-NAPOLCOM deputized HEI. This BS in Criminology-ETEEAP is especially offered by the University of Iloilo to enable the regular members of the Philippine National Police (PNP) the opportunity to obtain college education. It is also open to regular members of the BJMP, BFP, P&PA, NBI, PPA, and members of government and private institutions with Criminology-related functions.

In 2008, the university was acquired by PHINMA. It became part of PEN or PHINMA Education Network in April 2009. Its sister schools are Araullo University, Cagayan de Oro College, and University of Pangasinan. In 2025, PHINMA University of Iloilo announced its plan to establish a campus in Roxas City.

== The old university seal ==
The old university seal prior to the acquisition of the University by the PHINMA Group from the Lopez Family.

The old seal of the University of Iloilo has twelve continuous undulating and well-defined convex curves, each representing the twelve schools and colleges that composed the institution at the time it was granted the University status on December 17, 1968. These were the (1) laboratory School Unit, (2) High School Unit (Day Class), (3) High School Unit (Evening Class), (4) College of Arts & Sciences, (5) College of Commerce and Accountancy, (6) College of Criminology, (7) College of Education, (8) College of Engineering, (9) College of Agriculture, (10)Department of Nursing, (11) College of Law, and (12) School of Graduate Studies. Each wave exerts a potent force in its respective field of endeavor, creating an individually progressive sense of movement. The reverse concave curves give the cohesive atmosphere and represent the flexibility to adjust to ever-changing conditions.

The word Excelsior is the institution's inspiring force. The right hands of a man and a woman represent action in a coeducation environment. The lighted torch stands for the means by which truth and knowledge is achieved, with Truth as the ultimate goal, of the search.

The two stars represent the Lopez brothers, Don Eugenio and Hon. Fernando Lopez, who both conceived this institution especially intended for the poor and the middle class. July 1, 1947 was its foundation year. A serif font was used to symbolize dignity. The colors green and gold are the University colors; the green symbolizing the youthful vigor of a young and growing institution and the gold, the enduring luster and splendor of the ideals for which its stands.

== Colleges and other departments ==
- College of Allied Health Sciences
- College of Business and Accountancy
- College of Allied Health Sciences
- College of Criminal Justice Education
- College of Education (Teacher Education)
- College of Engineering
- College of Information Technology Education
- College of Tourism and Hospitality Management
- College of Maritime Education
- College of Arts and Sciences
- Graduate school
- Basic Education Department

== Notable people ==
Notable people of the university include:

- Fernando Lopez - Former Vice President of the Republic of the Philippines and founder of University of Iloilo.
- Jose Jimoga-on, Sr. - Co-founder of University of Iloilo.
- Rodolfo Ganzon - Senator.
- Noel Cadete - President of then Philippine Nurses Association.
- Virginia Gubatangga - Assistant Nursing Service Director of West Visayas State University Medical Center.
- Alejandro Que - CEO and Chairman of Que Group that includes, owns and operates the largest homegrown supermarket chain in Iloilo, the Iloilo Supermart.
- Engr. Herman M.Lagon, PhD - Multi-Awarded Teacher, School Paper Adviser, and Researcher.
- Eugenio Lopez, Sr. - Also known as Eñing López and Don Eugenio, he founded the Manila Chronicle and Chronicle Broadcasting Network (which later merged with Alto Broadcasting System and became ABS-CBN Corporation).
- Rogelio Borro - Professor at Jose Rizal University and Mathematics Book Author.
- Erlinda Dollosa Ganzon - Assistant Professor at University of Iloilo and Co-Author of the book titled: Filipino 2: Pagbasa at Pagsulat Tungo sa Pananaliksi with Teresita Hontiveros, Ph.D (Published in 2005 by Mindset Publishing, Inc.).
- Felipe Uygongco - Chinese-Filipino business magnate and patriarch of the Uygongco Family of Iloilo who owns the La Filipina Uy Gongco Corporation.

== Sister schools ==
- PHINMA – Araullo University, Cabanatuan, Philippines
- PHINMA – Cagayan de Oro College, Cagayan de Oro, Philippines
- PHINMA – University of Pangasinan, Dagupan, Philippines
- Southwestern University PHINMA, Cebu City, Philippines
- PHINMA – St. Jude College, Metro Manila, Philippines
- Republican College PHINMA NCR, Metro Manila, Philippines
- PHINMA – Rizal College of Laguna, Laguna, Philippines
- PHINMA – Union College of Laguna, Laguna, Philippines
