= Ahmed Cuizon =

Filipino media practitioner

Ahmed G. Cuizon
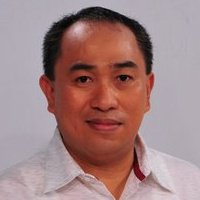

Assistant General Manager of the Mactan Cebu International Airport Authority
- Incumbent
- Assumed office October 27, 2014
- Preceded by: Romeo Bersunda

Central Visayas Regional Director of Land Transportation Franchising and Regulatory Board
- In office December 15, 2010 – October 26, 2014
- President: Benigno Aquino III
- Preceded by: Benjamin Go

Personal details
- Born: March 17, 1965 (age 61)
- Education: Southwestern University

Ahmed G. Cuizon is a media practitioner in Cebu Philippines.

He was the anchor of Sugbuanon Na Ni over Radio Station DYAB and A Contributing writer in Cebu's Newspaper . He started his broadcast career in 2003 with DYAB AM as a News and Public Affairs Host. A member of KBP Kapisanan ng mga Brodkaster ng Pilipinas He wrote the History of Lapu-Lapu City for the Cebu Provincial History Project.

He was Public Affairs Manager of the Mactan Cebu International Airport

December 15, 2010 he was appointed by president Benigno Aquino III as the new director of the Land Transportation Franchising and Regulatory Board (Philippines) (LTFRB ) 7.

He is a Career Executive Service Officers.

Cuizon is gearing up to return to the Mactan Cebu International Airport Authority (MCIAA) as assistant general manager, he received an outstanding score from the Career Executive Performance Evaluation System (Cespes).

Cuizon got a Cespes final score of 6.55 for 2013.

== Work History ==
Cuizon served the government through the following positions:

- Division Manager C, Public Affairs Office, Mactan–Cebu International Airport Authority, April 2003 - December 2010
- Senior Public Relations Officer, Public Affairs Office, Mactan–Cebu International Airport Authority, November 1996 – March 2003
- Senior Planning Officer, Metro Cebu Development Project, March 1996 – November 1996
- Human Resource Management Officer, Metro Cebu Development Project, March 1992 – February 1996
- Information Systems Analyst, Metro Cebu Development Project, July 1991 – February 1992
- Project Development Officer, Metro Cebu Development Project, January – June 1991
- Public Information Officer, Department of Public Works and Highways, Project Management Office – Manila, July – December 1990
- Senior Clerk, Philippine Information Agency – Region 7, June 1990
- Artist / Illustrator, Philippine Information Agency – Region 7, July 1989 – May 1990

| Preceded by Benjamin Go | Central Visayas Regional Director of Land Transportation Franchising and Regulatory Board; 2010 – 2014 | Succeeded by |
