= Nico Salva =

Filipino basketball player (born 1990)

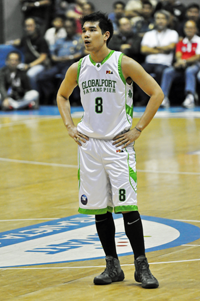
- Salva with the GlobalPort Batang Pier in 2014

Ateneo Blue Eagles
- Title: Assistant coach
- League: UAAP

Personal information
- Born: March 8, 1990 (age 36) Quezon City, Philippines
- Listed height: 6 ft 3 in (1.91 m)
- Listed weight: 194 lb (88 kg)

Career information
- High school: La Salle Green Hills (Mandaluyong); San Beda (Taytay, Rizal)
- College: Ateneo (2008–2012)
- PBA draft: 2013: 2nd round, 11th overall pick
- Drafted by: GlobalPort Batang Pier
- Playing career: 2013–2022
- Position: Small forward
- Coaching career: 2024–present

Career history

Playing
- 2013–2014: GlobalPort Batang Pier
- 2014–2015: Barako Bull Energy
- 2015–2016: Barangay Ginebra San Miguel
- 2016–2017: Mahindra Floodbuster / Kia Picanto
- 2017–2020: Meralco Bolts
- 2022: Phoenix Super LPG Fuel Masters

Coaching
- 2024–present: Ateneo (assistant)

Career highlights
- PBA champion (2016 Governors'); 5× UAAP champion (2008–2012); 2× UAAP Finals MVP (2011, 2012); UAAP All-Rookie Team (2008); 2× UNIGAMES champion (2008, 2009); 2× PCCL champion (2009, 2010); PCCL Finals MVP (2010); 2× PCCL Mythical Team (2010, 2011); Nike Summer League champion (2008); FilOil Flying V Cup champion (2011)

Nicolas Raymond J. Salva (born March 8, 1990) is a Filipino basketball coach and former player. He was selected 11th overall in the 2013 PBA draft by the Batang Pier. He played for the Ateneo Blue Eagles during his collegiate career, in which he now serves as an assistant coach.

== Early life ==
Salva played for both the La Salle Greenies and the San Beda Red Cubs in the NCAA Juniors division. In his final high school season, he averaged 20.7 points, 11.3 rebounds, 2.7 assists and 1.5 blocks as his team almost upset the Letran Squires in the NCAA Final Four, and made the NCAA Mythical Five. He had offers to play for DLSU, UP (his father's alma mater), and stay with San Beda, but he chose to play for Ateneo. He chose Ateneo after a personal meeting with businessman and Ateneo sports patron Manny V. Pangilinan.

== College career ==
Salva played college basketball for Ateneo Blue Eagles of the University Athletic Association of the Philippines (UAAP) for five years. In all of those years, Salva has won a UAAP championship and was the Finals MVP in 2011 and 2012, his final two years in college.

=== Early seasons (2008–2010) ===
Salva joined a recruiting class that included Ryan Buenafe, Justin Chua, and Frank Golla. In his freshman debut, he got his first UAAP point by scoring one point from the free throw line. He got his first championship that season when Ateneo swept DLSU in the UAAP Finals of Season 71, and he also made the All-Rookie Team, along with Buenafe.

For his second season, Salva played a vital role as the power forward off the bench, despite being undersized at 6'3". Increasing his numbers to 8.1 points, 4 rebounds and 0.8 blocks, he won the Sixth Man of the Year award for Season 72. He was suspended for one game for punching Jens Knuttel of the FEU Tamaraws. That year, Ateneo clinched a UAAP title, a UNIGAMES championship, and a Philippine Collegiate Champions League (PCCL) title.

In his third year, Salva had to step up some more as Ateneo lost its Finals MVP Rabeh Al-Hussaini to graduation, along with several key players in Jai Reyes and Noy Baclao. In their first game of Season 73, he missed a game-winner against FEU. Against the UP Fighting Maroons, he scored 18 points on 5-of-7 shooting. At the end of the first round of eliminations, he had led Ateneo in scoring with nearly 13 points a game, while supplying six rebounds. However, in a rematch against UP in the second round, he injured his finger. Following the injury, and increased defensive pressure on him from opponents, he had a four-game stretch where he totaled just 16 points, capped by a zero-point, 0-for-6 line in a loss to UE. He was able to bounce back once his finger healed, as he grabbed a double-double of 13 points and 12 rebounds against the Adamson Falcons. In the postseason, he normed 10 points and 6.7 boards to help lead Ateneo to a three-peat.

=== Finals MVP seasons (2011–2012) ===
In the third game of his fourth season, Salva contributed 12 points and 10 rebounds as Ateneo won over the NU Bulldogs. He then had 14 points in a win over the UST Growling Tigers, their sixth straight that season. In a win over FEU, he scored 18 points with nine rebounds. In a rematch against UST, he scored 20 as Ateneo grabbed in ninth straight win. Ateneo then blew out DLSU for its 11th straight win, in which he had 19 points. He then had 16 points, six rebounds, and two blocks in another win over UP. They only lost one game throughout the entire two elimination rounds, which was against Adamson and in which he only made two of his eight shots. In Game 1 of the Finals, he scored 24 points on a perfect eight for eight shooting display, and also made all eight of his free throws. The following game, he scored 15 as he won his fourth straight UAAP title, and his first Finals MVP award.

During the championship bonfire for Season 74, Salva boldly claimed that Ateneo would win one more title the following year, completing a five-peat. To begin Season 75, he scored 14 points and six rebounds for a win over Adamson. Against La Salle, he had 16 points and seven boards as Ateneo got its third win in four games. In a win over UP, he finished with 21 points (with 11 coming in the second quarter), five rebounds, and three assists while going 6-of-10 from the field and making all nine of his free throws. In a rematch against Adamson, he scored 12 of his 24 points in the fourth quarter as Ateneo qualified for the playoffs. They made it back to the Finals where in Game 1, he scored a career-high 30 points and Ateneo won. In scoring 30 points, he became only the third Atenean to score 30 or more in a UAAP Finals game, after LA Tenorio and Al-Hussaini. He was limited to just eight the following game, but Ateneo still managed to win, and he received his fifth UAAP championship.

== Professional career ==
=== GlobalPort Batang Pier (2013–2014) ===
Salva was drafted by GlobalPort Batang Pier eleventh overall in the 2013 PBA draft. He was among six Ateneo players taken in that draft, along with Greg Slaughter, Buenafe, Justin Chua, JP Erram, and Chris Sumalinog. Aside from him, the Batang Pier also drafted Terrence Romeo, RR Garcia, and Isaac Holstein. He was signed to a two-year contract worth more than P3.5 million. In a 2013–14 Philippine Cup loss to the Air21 Express, he had nine points.

=== Barako Bull Energy (2014–2015) ===
On June 4, 2014, Salva and Bonbon Custodio was traded by GlobalPort to Barako Bull Energy for Ronjay Buenafe and a 2015 second-round pick. He played limited minutes with the team.

=== Barangay Ginebra San Miguel (2015–2016) ===
On August 25, 2015, Salva and a 2016 first-round pick was traded by Barako Bull to Barangay Ginebra San Miguel for Josh Urbiztondo, Jens Knuttel, and Emman Monfort. In a 2015–16 Philippine Cup win over the Meralco Bolts, he scored 11 points to go with six rebounds. He won a championship with Ginebra during the 2016 Governors' Cup. At the end of the season, Ginebra tried to trade him to Meralco, but negotiations fell through.

=== Mahindra Floodbuster (2016–2017) ===
On November 15, 2016, Salva was traded by Barangay Ginebra for Mahindra Floodbuster's 2017 second-round pick. During the 2016–17 Philippine Cup, he scored in double-digits in back-to-back games with 10 points and seven rebounds against the San Miguel Beermen and 11 points against Ginebra, but both games were losses. As a result, Mahindra fell to 0–5. They finally got their first win of the season in a Christmas Day game against the Blackwater Elite, in which he had 14 points. They followed it up with another win, this time over Meralco, in which his 13 points helped keep the game out of reach. Against the Star Hotshots, he had 15 points, but they lost and ended the conference with a record of 3–8.

=== Meralco Bolts (2017–2020) ===
During the 2017 offseason, Salva signed with Meralco, where he reunited with his college head coach Norman Black. In a 2017–18 Philippine Cup game against the NLEX Road Warriors, he scored 20 points on 9-of-12 shooting, but Meralco lost due to a game winner from Kiefer Ravena. In a 2018 Commissioner's Cup game against the Columbian Dyip, he scored 13 points off the bench. He tied his then-PBA career high in Game 2 of their Governors' Cup semifinal series against Alaska with 20 points, but Alaska tied the series. Alaska went on to win the series 3–1.

In the offseason, Meralco extended Salva's contract for two more years. On January 16, 2019, he recorded a new PBA-career high of 22 points with two steals in a loss to the Phoenix Fuel Masters. Against Blackwater, he scored 12 of his 14 points in the fourth quarter to give Meralco its first win of the season. He then had 16 points off the bench in an overtime win over the Batang Pier. He led the team with 18 points in a loss to the Rain or Shine Elasto Painters. Meralco then dropped to 3–7 and out of playoff contention for the Philippine Cup in a loss to Alaska, despite a PBA career-high 23 points, eight rebounds, and three assists from him. In the Commissioner's Cup, he had 15 points and seven boards in a win over Phoenix, and 14 in a loss to NLEX. He also contributed during the 2019 Governors' Cup Finals against Ginebra, where in Game 2, he contributed nine points, two rebounds, and four assists in 17 quality minutes as Meralco tied the series with a win. Ginebra however, went on to win in five games.

During the 2020 PBA season, he helped Meralco make the All-Filipino semifinals for the first time in franchise history. After that season, he became a free agent once again.

=== Phoenix Super LPG Fuel Masters (2021–2022) ===
Initially, Salva was going to play for Phoenix's PBA 3x3 team, the Limitless Appmasters. Before he could play for them in the first conference of the 2021 season however, Phoenix brought him to the Fuel Masters. He only played one game for Phoenix.

== Career statistics ==
Legend
GP	Games played	MPG	Minutes per game
FG%	Field-goal percentage	3P%	3-point field-goal percentage	FT%	Free-throw percentage
RPG	Rebounds per game	APG	Assists per game	SPG	Steals per game
BPG	Blocks per game	PPG	Points per game	**Bold**	Career high

As of the end of 2021 season

=== PBA season-by-season averages ===
Year	Team	GP	MPG	FG%	3P%	FT%	RPG	APG	SPG	BPG	PPG
2013–14	GlobalPort	25	11.8	.305	.133	.789	1.9	.5	.2	.0	3.2
2013–14	Barako Bull	25	11.8	.305	.133	.789	1.9	.5	.2	.0	3.2
2014–15	Barako Bull	18	6.9	.321	.333	**1.000**	.9	.2	.0	.0	2.4
2015–16	Barangay Ginebra	16	6.2	.304	.214	.750	1.0	.2	.0	**.2**	2.1
2016–17	Mahindra / Kia	31	12.4	.305	.167	.722	2.0	.5	.1	**.2**	3.5
2017–18	Meralco	32	12.4	**.496**	**.423**	.750	**2.5**	.6	.1	**.2**	4.9
2019	Meralco	**37**	**15.7**	.456	.361	.871	**2.5**	**.7**	**.3**	**.2**	**6.1**
2020	Meralco	11	4.0	.400	.000	**1.000**	.5	.4	.0	.1	1.6
2021	Phoenix Super LPG	1	4.9	.000	—	—	.0	.0	.0	.0	.0
Career		171	11.5	.389	.302	.803	1.9	.5	.1	.1	3.9

=== UAAP ===
Year	Team	GP	MPG	FG%	3P%	FT%	RPG	APG	SPG	BPG	PPG
2008–09	Ateneo	16	9.4	.386	**1.000**	.538	1.9	.3	.1	.4	2.6
2009–10	Ateneo	15	17.0	**.505**	.286	.708	**7.1**	.7	.0	**.9**	7.5
2010–11	Ateneo	**17**	23.1	.398	.167	.698	5.8	1.1	**.4**	.8	9.6
2011–12	Ateneo	16	27.1	.465	.200	.844	5.9	**1.9**	.3	.5	13.9
2012–13	Ateneo	**17**	**27.9**	.497	.500	**.891**	5.0	1.6	.3	.4	**14.1**
Career		81	21.1	.458	.286	.783	5.1	1.1	.2	.6	9.6

== 3x3 career ==
After his stint with Phoenix, Salva returned to Limitless during the third conference of the 2021 season. He helped Limitless get to the Grand Finals quarterfinals where they lost to the Purefoods TJ Titans.

For the 2022–23 season, Salva joined Platinum Karaoke. In the first conference, he helped Platinum reach the Finals, where they lost to TNT Tropang Giga. In the second conference, they finally won a leg of the tournament. They won another leg during the third conference, beating the Cavitex Braves.

=== Coaching career ===
In 2024, Salva was hired by the Ateneo Blue Eagles to coach their 3x3 basketball teams.

== National team career ==
Salva got to play for the Philippine men's national team during the 2011 SEA Games. That year, they won over all their opponents en route to the gold medal.

== Personal life ==
In 2021, Salva married Karla Aguas, a RX 93.1 radio personality. They have known each other since he was still playing for the Blue Eagles. He was previously in a relationship with Miss World 2013 Megan Young.

Salva has been outspoken on Twitter. In 2012, after the Philippine national men's football team lost to Singapore, he called the match "boring", and was bashed online by football fans. In 2013, he engaged in a Twitter back-and-forth with FEU guard Terrence Romeo about the latter's ball-hogging tendencies. In 2017, he claimed that there should be a separate MVP award for “imports” like and for locals in the midst of Ben Mbala's MVP campaign.

Throughout his career, Salva has engaged in philanthropy. In 2012, he participated in a charity basketball game for victims of Typhoon "Sendong". When he was still with KIA, he and the ballclub provided aid to orphanages. In 2020, he provided aid for frontliners and donated relief goods for the homeless in the Loyola Heights and Cubao areas of Quezon City. He also donated to a fund for non-regular PBA workers that was started by the Alaska Aces that year.

Salva is also an avid collector of fashion accessories. He began his collection during his high school days with Kobes and Air Jordans. Among the prized items in his collection include Comme des Garçons and GOLF le FLEUR* Converse sneakers, Kobe 2s signed by Kobe Bryant himself, and Rolex and Panerai watches.

Preceded by Jai Reyes	PCCL Finals MVP; 2010	Succeeded by Ian Sangalang
