= University of Northern Philippines =

Public university in Ilocos Sur, Philippines

- Pamantasan ng Kahilagaang Pilipinas (Filipino)
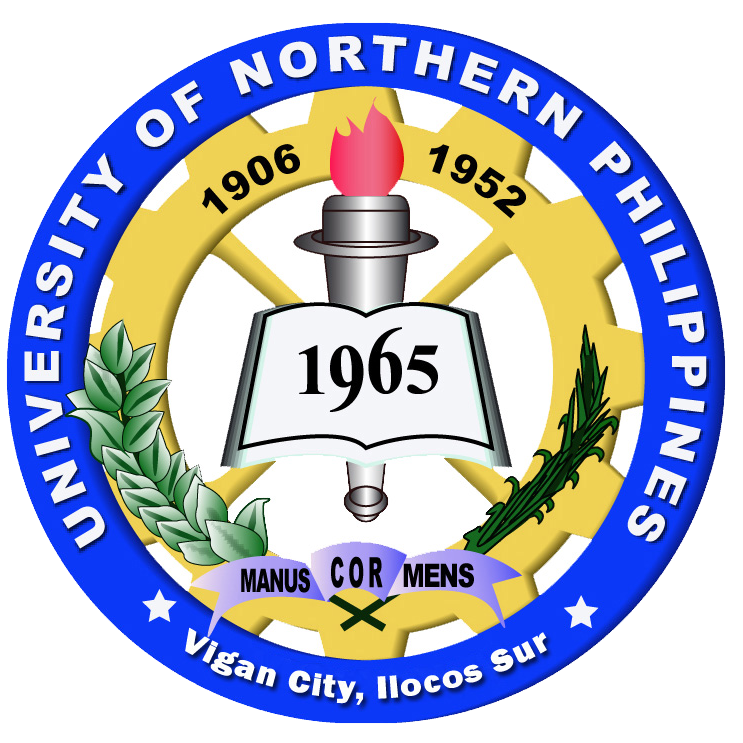
- Former names: Vigan High School (1906–1910); Vigan Trade School (1910-1931); Ilocos Sur Trade School (1931-1951); Northern Luzon School of Arts and Trades (1951-1960); Ilocos Sur School of Arts and Trades (1960-1965)
- Motto: Manus Cor Mens
- Type: State University
- Established: June 19, 1965
- Affiliations: SCUAA, PASUC
- President: Dr. Erwin F. Cadorna
- Vice-president: Dr. Rolando B. Navarro (Academic Affairs); Dr. Fatima F. Rocamora (Research & Extension); Dr. Albert R. Tejero (Finance & Administration)
- Location: Vigan City, Ilocos Sur, Philippines; 17°34′N 120°23′E
- Campus: Main: Vigan Satellite; Upland Research and Development Center (Sinait); Environmental Research and Training Center (Santo Domingo); Marine Research and Development Center (Santa Maria)
- Newspaper: New Tandem Publication
- Colors: Green, Blue, Gold
- Nickname: UNP Sharks
- Website: www.unp.edu.ph
- Location in Luzon Location in the Philippines

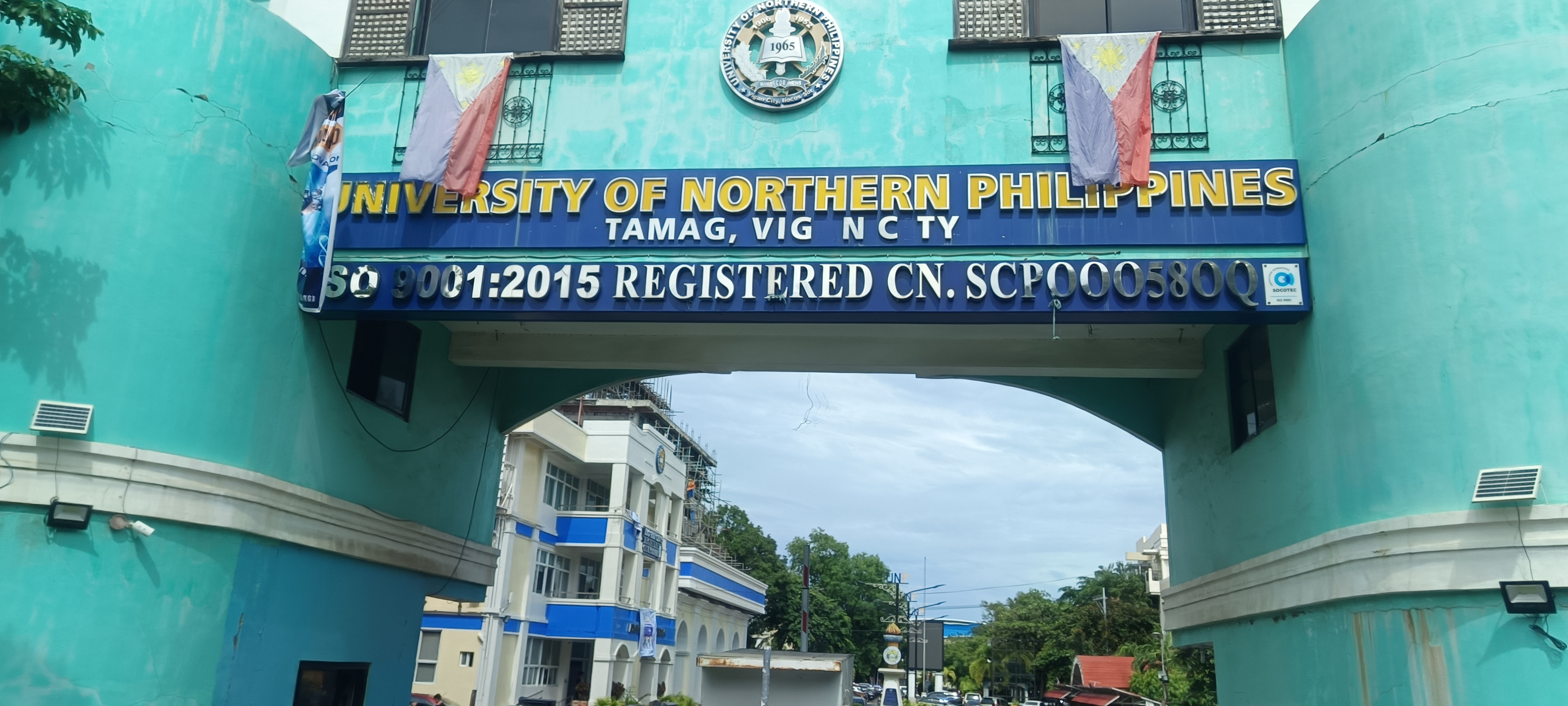
University of Northern Philippines entrance in Tamag, Vigan City

The University of Northern Philippines (UNP; Filipino: Pamantasan ng Kahilagaang Pilipinas) is a university in Barangay Tamag, City of Vigan, province of Ilocos Sur, Philippines. It is the first and oldest state university in Northern Luzon which offers low tuition fee, tracing its roots to 1906, which is older than the University of the Philippines by two years. It is the only state university in the province aimed for less-fortunate people and one of three state-owned educational institutions of higher learning operating in Ilocos Sur (with the Ilocos Sur Polytechnic State College and the Northern Luzon Polytechnic State College, a former branch of the university).

== History ==
The university began as the Vigan High School (present-day Ilocos Sur National High School) in 1906. Its shop department was converted into a separate intermediate level school, named the Vigan Trade School in 1910. It opened its high school in 1927 and produced its first graduates in 1931, when it evolved as the Ilocos Sur Trade School.

President Manuel Luis Quezon converted the Ilocos Sur Trade School in 1941 through the help of Assemblyman Benito T. Soliven and Governor Pedro Singson Reyes, but was temporarily halted due to World War II.

In 1951, the Ilocos Sur Trade School became the Northern Luzon School of Arts and Trades (NLSAT) by virtue of Republic Act 647. In 1960, by virtue of Republic Act 2700, or the General Appropriations Act of 1960, NLSAT was converted into the Ilocos Sur School of Arts and Trades (ISSAT).

On June 19, 1965, then-Congressman Floro S. Crisologo authored Republic Act 4449 and was signed into law at the Philippine Embassy in Roppongi, Tokyo, Japan, converting ISSAT into the University of Northern Philippines. The university then began implementing its Charter on October 14, 1965, with Crisologo widely recognized as the founder of the university.

The Candon Community College (CCC) was incorporated into the university in 1989 through Republic Act 6744, through the efforts of then-Congressman Eric D. Singson. It acted as a semi-autonomous unit. Despite this semi-autonomous status, the University of Northern Philippines – Candon Campus (formerly CCC) was split from the university by virtue of Republic Act 10085 (also authored by Singson) to become the Northern Luzon Polytechnic State College in 2010.

== Campuses ==
- Vigan (Tamag) Campus houses most of its 14 core colleges, the University Infirmary, and the university's FM radio station
- Sinait Campus houses the Upland Research and Development Center
- Santo Domingo (Quimmarayan) Campus houses the agricultural, fishery and research courses; and the Environmental Research and Training Center
- Santa Maria (Nalvo) Campus houses the Marine Research and Development Center

== Graduate school ==
- Doctor in Business Administration
- Master in Business Administration
- Master of Arts in Guidance and Counselling
- Master of Science in Criminal Justice with Specialization in Criminology
- Master of Arts in Nursing
- Master of Arts in Public Administration
  - Major in Local Government
  - Major in Government Administration
  - Major in Police Administration
- Master of Statistics
- Master of Arts in Teaching
  - Major in English
  - Major in Filipino
  - Major in Physical Education
- Master of Arts in Mathematics Education
- Master of Science in Teaching
  - Physics
  - Chemistry
- Master of Arts in Technology and Livelihood Education
  - Major in Industrial Arts
  - Major in Home Economics

== Open University ==
- Master of Arts in Education
- Master of Arts in Social Work
- Master in Public Administration
- Master of Arts in Nursing
- Bachelor of Science in Criminology

== College of Law ==
- Bachelor of Laws

== College of Architecture ==
- Bachelor of Science in Architecture
- Bachelor of Science in Interior Design
- Certificate in Architectural Interiors
- Certificate in Building Technology
- Certificate in Landscape Gardening

== College of Engineering ==
- Bachelor of Science in Civil Engineering
- Bachelor of Science in Geodetic Engineering
- Bachelor of Science in Sanitary Engineering

== College of Arts and Sciences ==
- Bachelor of Arts in Communication
- Bachelor of Arts in Political Science
- Bachelor of Arts in English
- Bachelor of Science in Psychology
- Bachelor of Science in Biology
- Bachelor of Science in Marine Biology
- Bachelor of Science in Environmental Studies
- Bachelor of Science in Mathematics
- Bachelor of Science in Physics
- Bachelor of Science in Statistics

== College of Business Administration and Accountancy ==
- Bachelor of Science in Accountancy
- Bachelor of Science in Business Administration: Human Resources Development Management, Financial Management
- Bachelor of Science in Entrepreneurship
- Bachelor of Science in Cooperative Management
- Associate in Office Management

== College of Communication and Information Technology ==
- BLIS
- Bachelor of Science in Computer Science
- Bachelor of Science in Information Technology
- One-year Computer Technology

== College of Criminology ==
- Master in Criminal Justice
- Bachelor of Science in Criminology
- Bachelor of Science in Law Enforcement Administration

== College of Social Work ==
- Bachelor of Science in Social Work

== College of Fine Arts ==
- Bachelor of Fine Arts: Advertising Arts, Painting
- Associate in Commercial Arts
- Bachelor of Science in Interior Design

== College of Health Sciences ==
This college, organized as the Institute of Community Health, originally intended to lead students into Medicine (as Level V) through a Step-Ladder version of the Bachelor of Science in Nursing curriculum as a Department of Health pilot project. It once attracted DOH scholars from as far as Region III. The BSN program of the college has been absorbed by the College of Nursing, and Level V has been spun off as the College of Medicine.

The college is currently offering the following courses:

- Bachelor of Science in Midwifery - an evolution of the former Level II of the BSN Step-Ladder Curriculum—Certificate in Midwifery
- Bachelor of Science in Community Health Management/Bachelor of Science in Emergency Health Science - contains elements of the former Level III of the BSN Step-Ladder Curriculum—Advanced Paramedics, and the only remaining Step Ladder-type course in the college
- Bachelor of Science in Medical Laboratory Science - one of two offered in the whole of the Ilocos Region

== College of Nursing ==
- Bachelor of Science in Nursing

== College of Teacher Education ==
The university's College of Teacher Education is a Center of Development.

- Bachelor of Elementary Education: General Education, Early Childhood Education, Special Education (new)
- Bachelor of Secondary Education: English, Filipino, Mathematics, Physical Sciences, Biological Sciences, Home Economics, Guidance Counseling, MAPEH, Social Sciences, General Science, Physical Education
- Bachelor of Science in Industrial Education: Electronics Technology, Automotive Technology, Home Economics, Practical Arts, Electrical Technology
- Bachelor of Library & Information Science: Academic Librarianship

== College of Tourism & Hospitality Management ==
- Bachelor of Science in Hotel & Restaurant Administration
- Bachelor of Arts in Tourism.

== College of Public Administration & Governance ==
- Bachelor of Arts in Public Administration

== College of Technology ==
- Bachelor of Science in Industrial Technology: Automotive, Electronics, Electricity
- Two-year Technical Course, Automotive, Electronics, Electricity
- One-year Special Course: Automechanics, Practical Electricity, Radio Mechanics, Refrigeration & Air Conditioning

== Laboratory Schools Basic Education ==
- K to 12

== Presidents ==
- Dr. Dedicacion Agatep-Reyes (founding president, 1972–1978)
- Dr. Romualdo Tadena (1978–1985)
- Dr. Dorotea Campos-Filart (1985–1998)
- Dr. Lauro Tacbas (1998–2011)
- Dr. Gilbert Arce (2011–2019)
- Dr. Erwin F. Cadorna (2019–present)

== University student publications ==
All academic departments in the university have their own publications, with the university's main school publication being the New Tandem, and Layap as its literary folio. The university's official publication is the UNP Chronicle. The College of Health Sciences was the first to publish its own literary publication, the Addang.

The University Chapter of the Junior Philippine Institute of Accountants has its own publication, The Ledger.

== See also ==
- List of state schools, colleges and universities in the Philippines
