= Horizon University Indonesia =

University in Karawang, Indonesia

Coordinates: 6.2895°S 107.2923°E

- Horizon University Indonesia
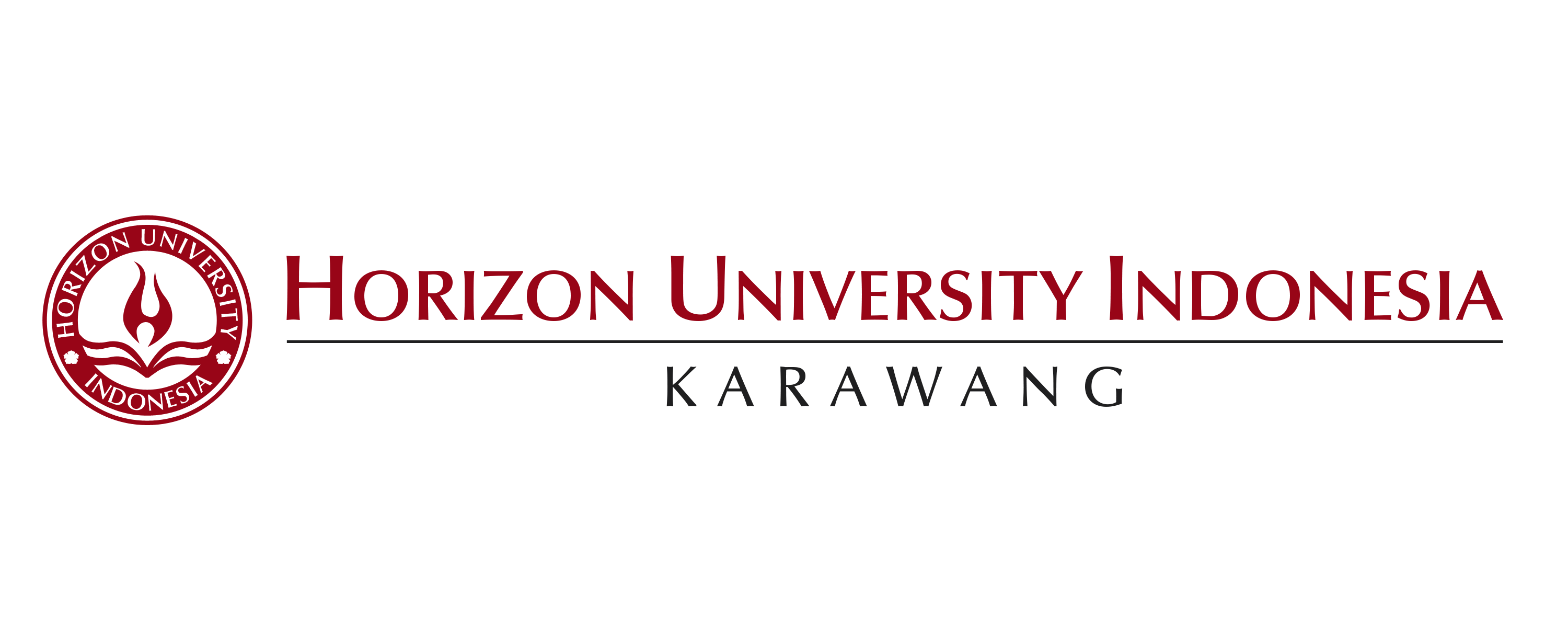
- Horizon University Indonesia Logo
- Motto: Shaping the Global Indonesian
- Type: University
- Established: November 6, 1991
- Location: Karawang, West Java, Republic of Indonesia Indonesia
- Website: horizon.ac.id

Horizon University Indonesia is a private university located in the city of Karawang, Indonesia. Formerly known as STMIK and STIKES Kharisma Karawang, the university's key offerings include active learning, industry partnerships, an English-immersive environment, industry-related technology, and strong core work skills. The university is composed of three academic faculties, Faculty of Health Sciences (FHS), Faculty of Information and Computer Technology (FICT), and Faculty of Management and Business (FMB).

== History ==
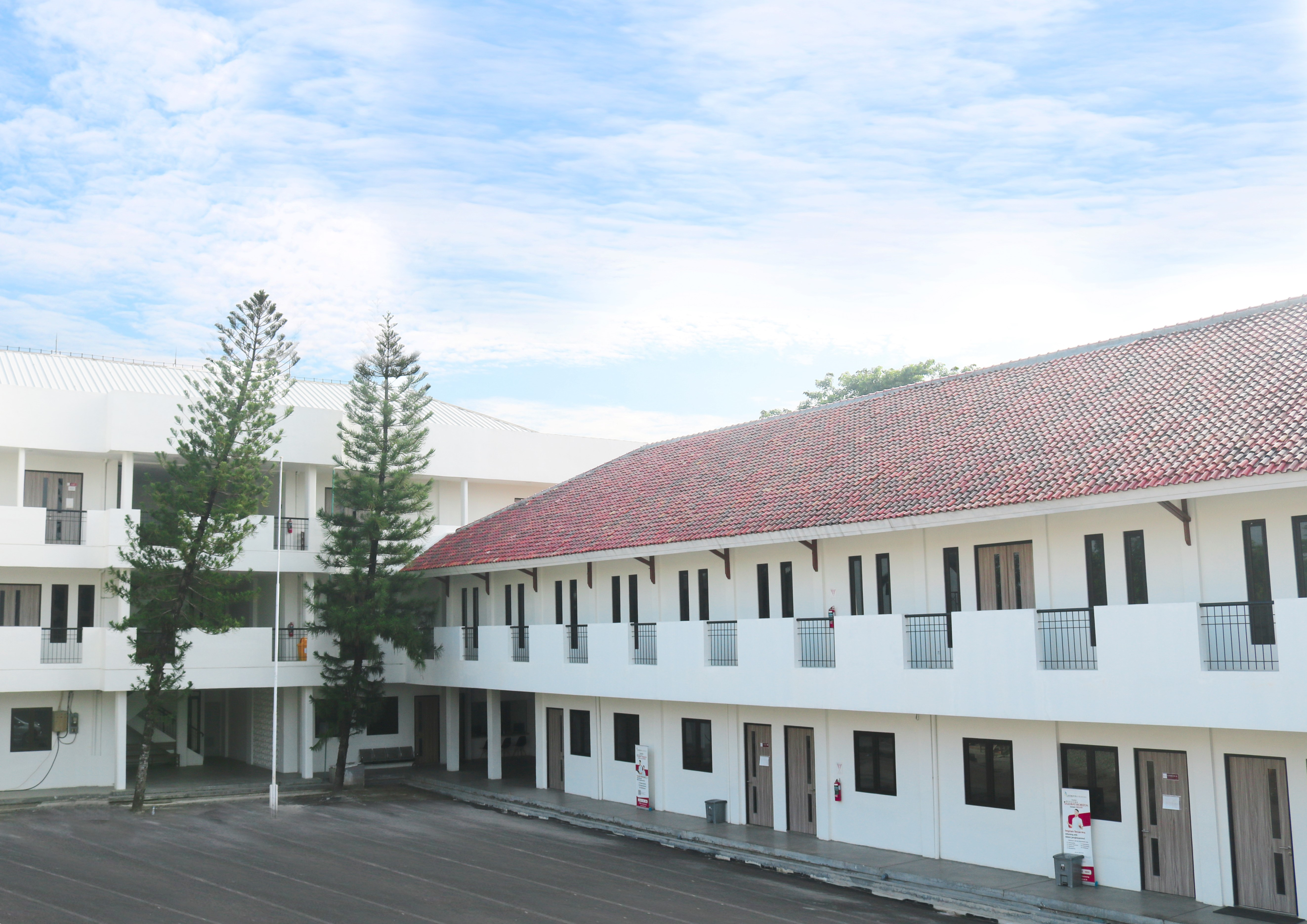
Horizon University Indonesia Campus

Horizon University Indonesia was formerly known as the Kharisma Nursing Academy (Akademi Keperawatan Kharisma), established by the Yayasan Pendidikan Kharisma 92 Karawang on November 6, 1991. With a commitment to nation-building through education, the foundation subsequently founded the Kharisma Midwifery Academy (Akademi Kebidanan Kharisma) in Karawang on July 14, 1992. In 2009, the Kharisma Midwifery Academy and Kharisma Nursing Academy became the Kharisma Health Sciences Institute or STIKes Kharisma (Sekolah Tinggi Kesehatan Kharisma). Prior to this, on December 27, 1995, the foundation established a campus specializing in Information Technology programs, namely the Kharisma Information Technology Academy or AMIK Kharisma (Akademi Manajemen Informatika dan Komputer Kharisma). AMIK Kharisma became the first Computer College in Karawang. AMIK Kharisma transformed into the Kharisma Information Technology Institute or STMIK Kharisma (Sekolah Tinggi Manajemen Informatika dan Komputer Kharisma) on August 10, 2000.

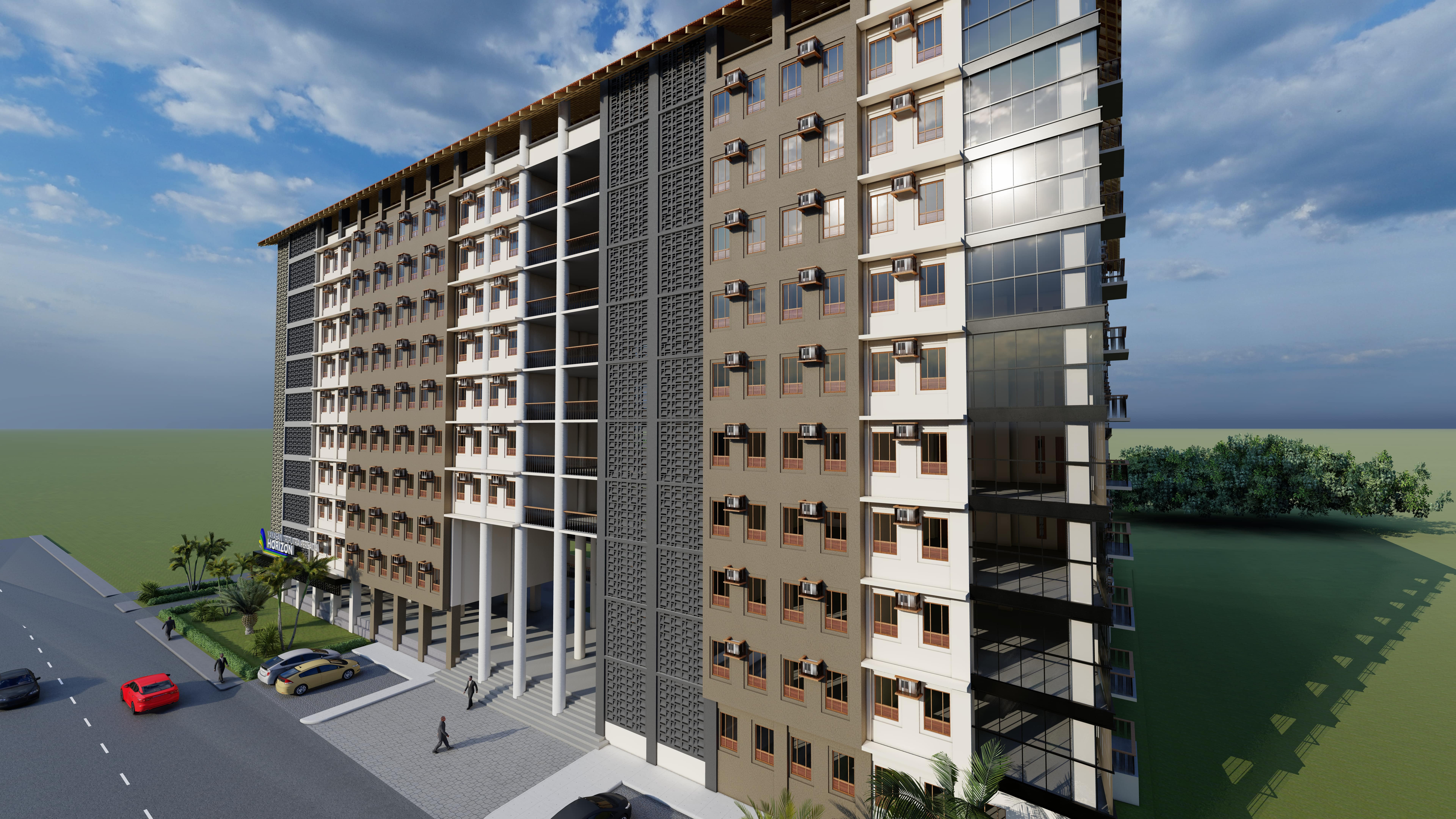
Soon to Rise - Horizon New Building

On May 28, 2019, the campuses of STIKes and STMIK Kharisma were subsequently acquired by the Yayasan Triputra Persada Horizon Education. This foundation was formed through a collaboration between two conglomerates in Indonesia, namely the Triputra Group and Persada Capital Investama, in partnership with PHINMA Education from the Philippines. On October 19, 2020, STIKes Kharisma was renamed STIKes Horizon Karawang, and on December 30, 2020, STMIK Kharisma was renamed STMIK Horizon Karawang. On November 17, 2022, the Yayasan Triputra Persada Horizon Education acquired STIE Triguna Bogor. On July 14, 2023, STIKes and STMIK Horizon Karawang, along with STIE Triguna Bogor, officially became Horizon University Indonesia in accordance with the Decree of the Minister of Education, Culture, Research, and Technology Number 595/E/O/2023. The campus of Horizon University Indonesia is located at Jalan Pangkal Perjuangan KM 1, By Pass, Tanjungpura, West Karawang, Karawang, West Java, Indonesia.

== Faculty and Program ==
Faculty of Management and Business (FMB)

1. S1 Accountancy
2. S1 Management (Financial Management and Marketing Management)

Faculty of Health Sciences (FHS)

1. S1 Nursing
2. Professional Nurse
3. D3 Midwifery
4. D3 Nursing

Faculty of Information and Computer Technology (FICT)

1. S1 Information Systems
2. S1 Informatics
