= University of Pangasinan =

Private university in Pangasinan, Philippines

PHINMA – University of Pangasinan, Inc.
- Pamantasan ng Pangasinan, Inc. (Filipino)
- Former names: Dagupan Institute (1925‑1941); Dagupan Junior College (1941‑1950); Dagupan College (1950‑1968)
- Motto: Patria, Virtus, Scientia
- Motto in English: Fatherland, Virtue, Science
- Type: Private, nonsectarian, coeducational
- Established: February 1925; 101 years ago
- Founders: Francisco Benitez; Apolinario de los Santos; Sylvestre Pascual; Blas Rayos
- Academic affiliations: PHINMA Education Network
- Officer in charge: Lyndon G. Padama (Chief Operating Officer); Renabel J. Suni (Assistant Chief Operating Officer)
- Chairman: Ramon R. Del Rosario, Jr. (Chairman); Magdaleno B. Albarracin, Jr. (Vice Chairman)
- President: Meliton "Chito" Salazar
- Dean: Danica H. Siapno (CMA Dean); Cherry B. Calaunan(CELA Dean); Aristotle B. Liwanag(CITE Dean); Franklin Q. De Guzman (CAS Dean); Rosario Charisse R. Venzon (CAHS Dean); Emmanuel Buan (CCJE Dean); Delaney C. Ofrecio(CEA Dean); Lloyd C. Diawan(CHTM Dean); Arlene A. Dacanay (UPang Urdaneta Academic Head); David John D. Cadiao(SHS Principal)
- Director: Adele S. Traspe(CSDL Director)
- University Admin: Bryan S. Pepito
- Students: 40,000 enrolled (2025)
- Location: Arellano Street, Dagupan, Pangasinan, 2400, Philippines; 16°02′48″N 120°20′30″E
- Campus: Urban
- Alma Mater song
- 100th FDC Theme Song
- Colors: Green and gold
- Nickname: Flames
- Sporting affiliations: UCAAP
- Website: up.phinma.edu.ph
- Location in Luzon Location in Philippines

PHINMA Upang College of Urdaneta
- Kolehiyo ng UPANG Urdaneta (Filipino)
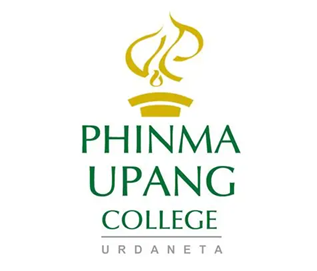
- Motto: Patria, Virtus, Scientia
- Motto in English: Fatherland, Virtue, Science
- Type: Private, nonsectarian, coeducational
- Established: February 2015; 11 years ago
- Founders: Blas Rayos; George Rayos
- Academic affiliations: PHINMA Education Network
- Officer in charge: Catherine R. Garcia (Chief Operating Officer); Renabel J. Suni (Assistant Chief Operating Officer)
- Chairman: Ramon R. Del Rosario, Jr. (Chairman); Magdaleno B. Albarracin, Jr. (Vice Chairman)
- President: Meliton "Chito" Salazar
- Dean: Arlene A. Dacanay (UPang Urdaneta Academic Head)
- Director: Adele S. Traspe(CSDL Director)
- Students: 10,000 enrolled (2025)
- Location: MacArthur Highway, Urdaneta, Pangasinan, 2428, Philippines; 15.9698°N 120.5722°E
- Campus: Urban
- Alma Mater song
- Colors: Green and gold
- Nickname: Flames
- Sporting affiliations: UCAAP
- Website: up.phinma.edu.ph
- Location in Luzon Location in Philippines

The PHINMA – University of Pangasinan and PHINMA Upang College of Urdaneta, also known as UPang , is a private and non-sectarian university located at Dagupan, Pangasinan, and Urdaneta, Pangasinan Philippines. It is a member of the PHINMA Education Network (PEN). It offers practically all undergraduate and graduate courses that Metro Manila universities offer. It has a staff of about 1200 faculty members and employees.

== History ==
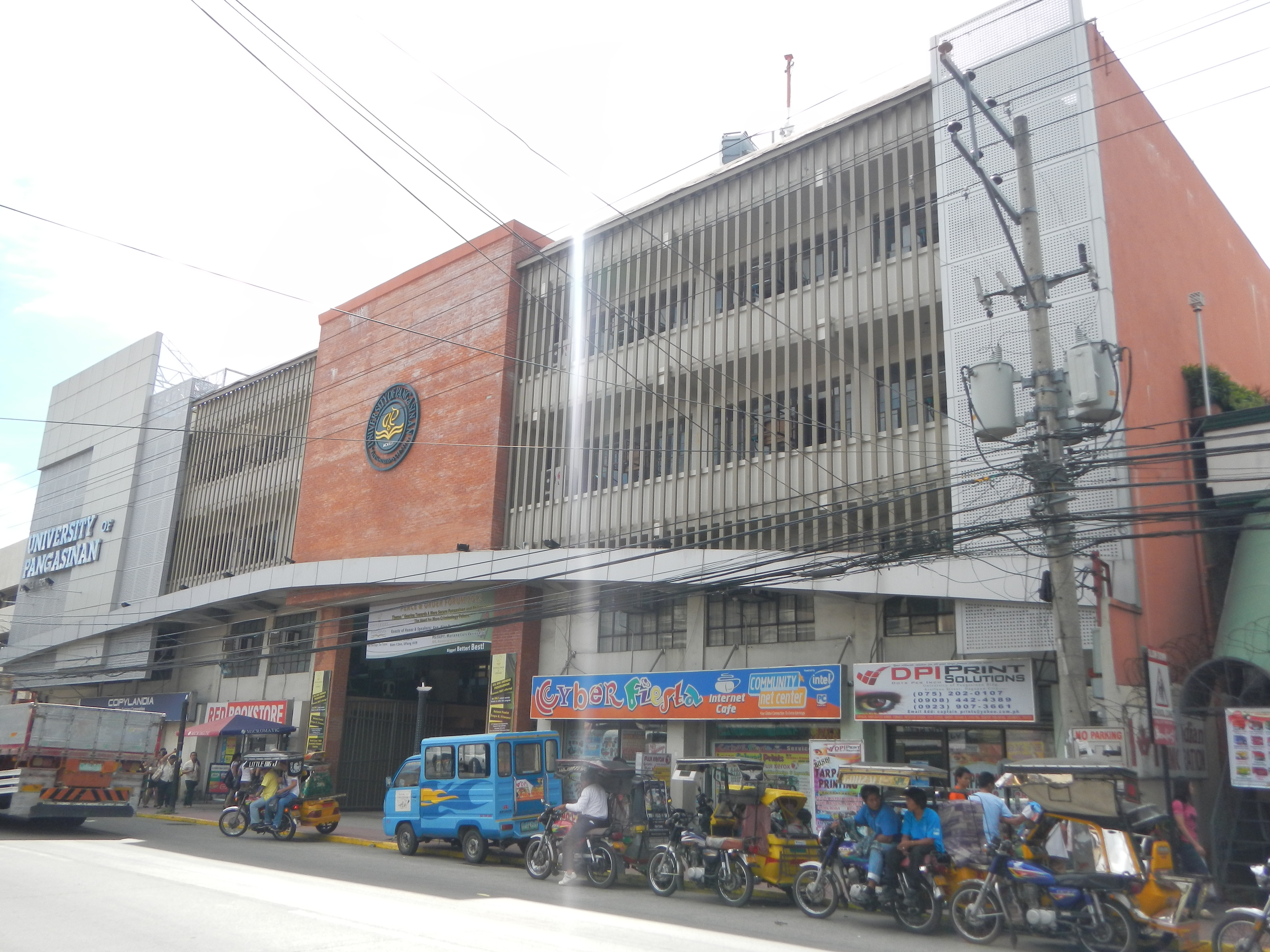
Facade

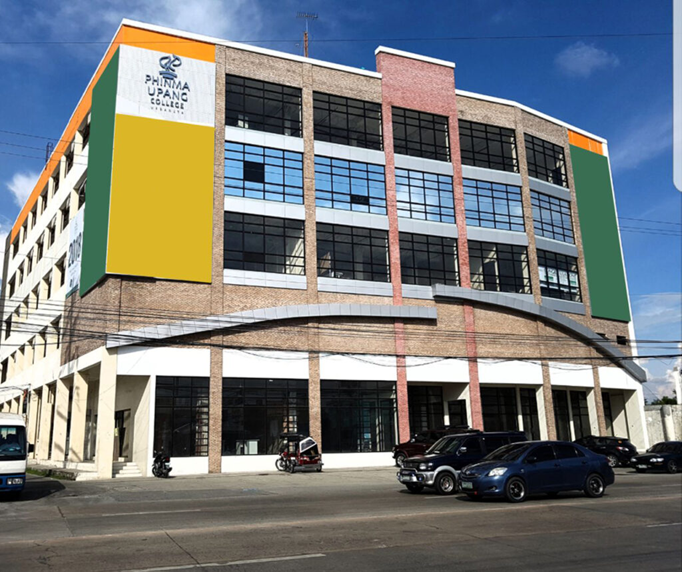
University of Pangasinan Urdaneta Campus Facade

=== Dagupan Institute ===
The University of Pangasinan started operation in 1925 as the Dagupan Institute, which offered elementary, secondary and vocational courses. It was founded by Dean Francisco Benitez of the University of the Philippines, who became the chairman of the board of directors; Blas F. Rayos; Apolinario delos Santos, then President of the University of Manila; Mariano delos Santos, then Dean of the University of Manila; Sylvestre Pascual; and Blas F. Rayos, then Dean of the College of Education of the University of Manila. Rayos became the president of the school and headed it for 45 years until 1975 when he died and was succeeded by his son, George O. Rayos, who served as president until 1987.

In 1937, the College of Liberal Arts was established with the president Blas F. Rayos Sr. as its first dean.

=== Dagupan Junior College ===
In 1941, the school was renamed the Dagupan Junior College. Its operation was interrupted by the outbreak of World War II in December 1941. It resumed operation in 1945 immediately after the war. Four courses were added to its offering soon after. These were civil engineering, architecture, graduate school, and secretarial science. Shortly thereafter, additional courses were offered such as secondary education, law, home economics, nursing, and commerce, with major in accounting, management, banking and finance, and economics.

=== Dagupan Colleges ===
In 1950, the school assumed the name Dagupan Colleges, and the Graduate School added courses leading to the degrees of Master of Arts in Philosophy and Master of Science in Business Administration. The school started a review class in Nursing in 1954. Eventually, review classes in Accounting, Civil Engineering and Law were offered. The year 1959 saw further expansion of curricular offerings with the opening of courses leading to the degrees of Bachelor of Science in Foods and Nutrition, and Bachelor of Science in journalism.

In the next decade following were added: the organization of Naval Reserve Officers' Training Corps (NROTC) and the Naval Women's Auxiliary Corps in 1960, and the offering of the Sanitary Engineering course in 1965.

On July 3, 1968, the college was converted into a university by virtue of the University Charter granted by the Department of Education. Thereforth, the school operated as the University of Pangasinan.

In 2009, the holding company Bacnotan Consolidated Industries Inc. bought 70% interest in the university. it became a member of the PHINMA Education Network.

== Centennial Celebration ==
In 2025, the University of Pangasinan celebrated its 100th Founding Anniversary since its establishment in February 1925 as the Dagupan Institute in Dagupan City, Pangasinan, Philippines. The centennial festivities were held at the Narciso Ramos Sports and Civic Center in Lingayen, Pangasinan, and were attended by students, alumni, faculty, and guests. Events included cultural presentations, performances, and recognition of alumni and long-serving faculty in honor of the university's century-long educational service. Emphasis during the celebrations was placed on the institution's contributions to higher education and its ongoing commitment to quality teaching and community development.

In September 2025, the Philippine Postal Corporation (PHLPost) released a set of official commemorative stamps marking the University of Pangasinan's centennial. The four-stamp collection featured the centennial logo, the university seal, and imagery reflecting its legacy, and was distributed through designated post offices nationwide.

== Student Services ==
PHINMA University of Pangasinan provides a wide range of student services and resources to support academic and personal development.

- Academic support services
- Guidance and counseling
- Scholarships and financial assistance
- Health services
- Campus organizations and activities
- Career services
- Student Information System (SIS) – an online platform that allows students to view their grades, pay tuition, and access their school records.

== Centennial Commemorative Stamp ==
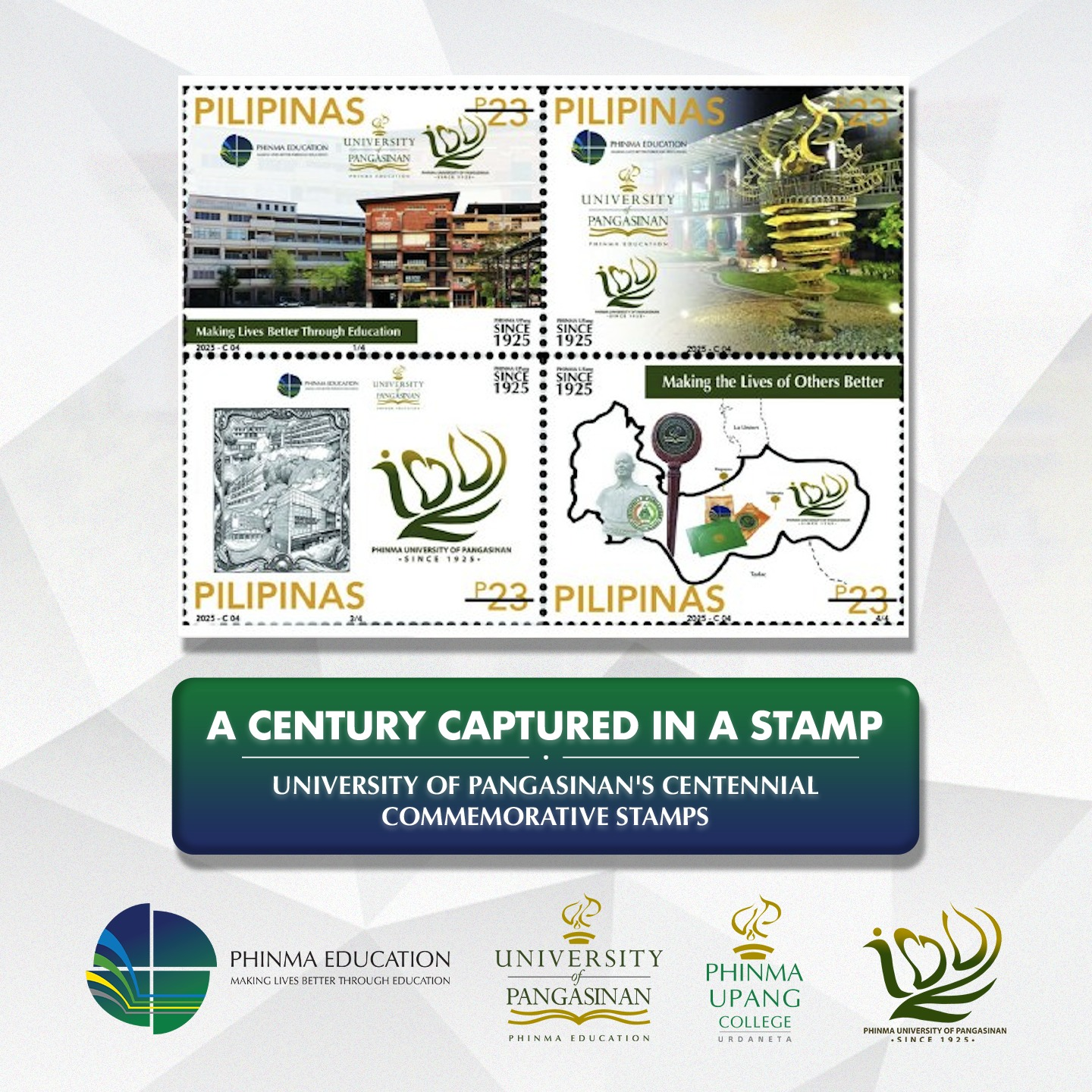
University of Pangasinan Centennial Commemorative Stamp

In September 2025, the Philippine Postal Corporation (PHLPost) issued a set of official commemorative postage stamps to mark the 100th founding anniversary of the University of Pangasinan (PHINMA UPang). The release coincided with the institution's centennial year, commemorating its establishment in 1925.

The philatelic issue consists of a four-stamp collection featuring imagery associated with the university, including an illustration of its main building, the official university seal, and the 100th-anniversary logo. The stamps also highlight the institution's motto “Truth, Science, and Virtue” and its historical evolution from its founding in Dagupan City to its present role as a regional academic institution.

A first-day cover was also released, depicting the university's centennial emblem and a timeline of its major milestones. The commemorative stamps were distributed through designated post offices nationwide and have attracted interest among collectors and alumni.
