= Southwestern University (Philippines) =

Private university in Cebu City, Philippines

Southwestern University PHINMA
- Former names: Southwestern Colleges (1946–1959); Southwestern University (1959–2015)
- Motto: Scientia Integritas Fidelitas
- Motto in English: Science Integrity Fidelity
- Type: Private, Nonsectarian, Co-educational basic and higher education institution
- Established: 1946
- Founders: Matias Hipolito C. Aznar II and Anunciacion Barcenilla Aznar
- Chairman: Chito B. Salazar, Ph.D (concurrently President)
- Students: 90,856 (S.Y. 2024)
- Location: Urgello Street, Cebu City, Cebu, Philippines; 10°18′07″N 123°53′31″E
- Campus: Urban; Main Campus Urgello St. Cebu City Satellite Campus Aznar Road, Cebu City
- Colors: Maroon and White
- Sporting affiliations: CESAFI
- Mascot: Cobras
- Website: swu.phinma.edu.ph
- Location in the Visayas Location in the Philippines

The Southwestern University, officially the Southwestern University PHINMA (SWU PHINMA), is a private university in Cebu City, Philippines.

Founded and opened in the summer of 1946 by two pharmacists, SWU originally started as Southwestern Colleges and achieved university status on December 11, 1959. The university and its base hospital were acquired by PHINMA Education, a subsidiary of PHINMA Corporation in 2015. The university was renamed to Southwestern University PHINMA and the hospital from Sacred Heart Hospital to Southwestern University Medical Center. The university changed the logo and closed its South Campus in Basak San Nicolas, Cebu City.

It has a large number of international students from different countries. Its international students come from 34 countries across five continents.

== Presidents ==
- Matias H. Aznar II (1946–1958), founder
- Anunciacion B. Aznar (1958–1968), co-founder
- Gabino Tabuñar (1968–1973)
- Matias B. Aznar III (1973–1975, 1978–1980)
- Julian B. Yballe (1975–1978)
- Manolo S. Fornolles (1981–1990)
- Alicia P. Cabatingan (1990–2001)
- Frances Victoria F. Lumain (2001–2006)
- Lassi Matti A. Holopainen (2006–2007)
- Maris Johanna A. Holopainen (2012–2015)
- Peter S. Aznar (March 2007–June 2007), acting president
- Eldigario D. Gonzales (2007–2010)
- Elsa A. Suralta, CESO VI (2010–2013)
- Noe G. Quiñanola (2013–2014)
- Chito B. Salazar (2014–present)

== Campuses ==
Southwestern University

Southwestern University is located in southern Cebu City, Philippines. It currently operates two campuses: the Main Campus on Urgello Street and the Aznar Coliseum Complex on Aznar Road, approximately 200 meters from the Main Campus.

The university formerly operated a South Campus, also known as the Basak Campus, on E. Sabellano Street in Basak San Nicolas, Cebu City. The campus has since closed and is now occupied by another school. It formerly housed the College of Veterinary Medicine, the Veterinary Teaching Hospital, and the Elementary and High School Training Departments. These programs were subsequently transferred to the Main Campus and Aznar Coliseum Complex.

=== Main Campus ===
The main campus is the home of the colleges of School of Design + Communication, Arts and Sciences, School of Business, Computer Studies, Criminology, Dentistry, Engineering, Graduate School, Law, Maritime, Medical Technology, Medicine, Optometry, Pharmacy, Physical Therapy, and Teachers' College.

The Southwestern Medical Center (formerly Sacred Heart Hospital), Pathology and Biology Museums, Library, Interfaith Chapel, Botanical Garden, and the Administrative Offices are found in the main campus.

=== Aznar Coliseum Complex ===
Aznar Memorial Coliseum

Located about 200 meters from the main campus, the complex is made up of Aznar Memorial Coliseum, a ballpark, and the Anunciacion B. Aznar building which houses the Pre-Elementary, Elementary Department and High School Departments, the Maritime Regiment, the 540th NROTC Unit, Department of Physical Education and the College of Nursing.

== Academic programs ==
Current programs since PHINMA acquisition (Graduate School inclusive):

- College of Dentistry
- College of Veterinary Medicine
- College of Rehabilitative Sciences
- College of Pre-Medicine
- College of IT & Engineering
- Business School
- School of Health & Allied Health Sciences
- School of Medicine
- School of Law & Government
- School of Design + Communication
- SWU "Next" Programs
- Basic Education (preschool, primary, junior high)
- Senior High School

== Notable alumni ==
=== Politics ===
- Allan L. Rellon

=== Sports ===
- Cyrus Baguio
- Arlo Chavez
- Ric-Ric Marata
- Yoyong Martirez
- Ben Mbala
- Mary Joy Tabal
- Mac Tallo
- Jojo Tangkay

=== Entertainment ===
- Ahmed Cuizon
- Ernesto Lariosa
- Alma Moreno

== See also ==
- Matias H. Aznar Memorial College of Medicine

== Sources ==
- http://www.swu.edu.ph/about.php?idname=history
- http://www.university-directory.eu/Philippines/Southwestern-University.html
- Southwestern University Handbook
