= Bryan Gahol =

Filipino basketball player

Personal information
- Born: July 30, 1977 Los Baños, Laguna, Philippines
- Died: March 31, 2014 (aged 36) South Luzon Expressway
- Listed height: 6 ft 5 in (1.96 m)
- Listed weight: 205 lb (93 kg)

Career information
- College: UP
- PBA draft: 1999: 1st round, 4th overall pick
- Drafted by: Mobiline Phone Pals
- Playing career: 1999–2005
- Position: Power forward / center
- Number: 21

Career history
- 1999: Mobiline Phone Pals
- 2000–2002: Alaska Aces
- 2002–2005: San Miguel Beermen
- 2005–2006: Red Bull Barako
- 2007–2008: Quezon–Villa Anita (NBC)

Career highlights
- PBA champion (2000 All-Filipino)

Bryan Paraon Gahol (July 30, 1977 – March 31, 2014) was a former Filipino professional basketball player in the Philippine Basketball Association (PBA).

== Professional career ==
Gahol was a highly scouted prospect from the time he suited up for the Philippine Youth team and the injuries that hit him early in his career notwithstanding was expected to do well when he was drafted fourth overall by Mobiline in 1999. The former University of the Philippines standout, though, hardly made an impact with the Phone Pals, who soon sent him packing in a three-team, four player transaction that also involved Shell and Tanduay. He initially landed at Shell, which later traded him to Alaska for Brixter Encarnacion. After Alaska, he also suited up for San Miguel and Red Bull Barako before retiring in 2006.

== Death ==
Gahol was killed along with companion Rosemarie Manalo in a multiple-vehicle collision along the Skyway in the evening of March 31, 2014. He was driving a Nissan Urvan Escapade on the northbound lane of the SLEX near the Alabang exit at 10pm Monday night, along with four other friends, when their vehicle was hit by a delivery jeep filled with vegetables. Gahol and Manalo were declared dead on arrival at the hospital.

His remains were laid to rest at Makiling Memorial Garden in Los Baños, Laguna.
