= Olan Omiping =

Filipino basketball player

Personal information
- Born: 1981/1982 Manila, Philippines
- Listed height: 6 ft 1 in (1.85 m)

Career information
- College: Letran (2000); UE (2002–2004)
- PBA draft: 2006: 2nd round, 20th overall pick
- Drafted by: Purefoods Chunkee Giants
- Playing career: 2004–2017
- Position: Point guard
- Number: 4

Career history
- 2004: Fash Liquid Detergent
- 2005: Iligan Crusaders
- 2013–2017: PNP Responders

Career highlights
- UNTV Cup Champion (Season 5); 2× UNTV Cup Season MVP (Season 1, Season 2); 2× UNTV Cup Mythical Five member (Season 4, Season 5)

Olan Omiping (born 1981/1982), known for his moniker as "The Sniper", is a Filipino policeman with the Police Officer II rank and former basketball player for the Philippine National Police Responders in the UNTV Cup.

== Profile ==
A native of Tondo, Manila, Omiping, who named Michael Jordan as his basketball inspiration, started played basketball at the age of 11 at the court near his house and influenced by his two older brothers who first played basketball. In his first year, he was a consistent titleholder and the MVP in different Barangay leagues. Omiping tried-out for the Aqua Safe team in the Philippine Chinese Basketball League and in the Tanduay Junior Lapad team in the PBL where he won a championship.

=== Collegiate and amateur career ===
During his collegiate career, Omiping was one of the top defensive stoppers in both NCAA and UAAP. First played for Letran Knights, he was moved to the UE Red Warriors in 2002, after serving the 2-year residency rule, where he teamed up with PBA players James Yap, Nino Cañaleta, Paul Artadi and Ronald Tubid under coach Boysie Zamar. He was a graduated student of business administration, major in management in the University of the East.

In 2003, Omiping was made it into the 26-man national training pool of the Philippine men's national basketball team.

He also played for the Iligan Crusaders in 2005 in the National Basketball Conference, Fash Liquid Laundry Detergent in the Philippine Basketball League and in the first Philippine Collegiate Champions League in 2002 where he suffered an injury to his right hand during Game 1 that signified the end of his possible chances to get the MVP award. However, he was part of the Mythical 5 selection. Afterwards, UE won the title.

=== PBA ===
He was drafted 20th overall by the then-Purefoods Chunkee Giants (now Star Hotshots) in the 2006 PBA draft, he is the last player to make in into the draft during the second round. Fresh from his collegiate career span for 4 years, Omiping was nervous in the draft but he had high hopes to make it into the PBA. In his stay with the Purefoods team, he was reunited with former UE Red Warriors teammates James Yap and Paul Artadi, however, he played only in the pre-season games. Purefoods was looking for a point guard and Omiping was part of those who were considered for the position, including Boyet Bautista and Artadi. His assistant coach Ryan Gregorio wanted Omiping to wait for another year, try Bautista in the position and give Artadi a second chance, after the team's victorious run in the two conferences of the 2005–06 PBA season. Omiping chances to make in into the PBA went into perished.

In 2013, Alaska coach Luigi Trillo expressed interest to have Omiping in their team, but the plan did not materialized.

=== PNP ===
Right after graduating in college, his father suggests to Omiping to take the NAPOLCOM exam.

In November 2006, Omiping's neighbor from Tondo, a police officer tells him about the try-outs for PNP's men's basketball team, of which he accepted the exam and submitted his necessary requirements. After that, he was called to Camp Crame for an agility test, where only 150 made the cut out of more than 1,000 aspiring police trainees. He is ranked #65 in the test and was eligible to go to training at the National Police Training Institute. In his second month of training, Alaska Aces has interested to play him and to move out eventually in the NPTI. However, Omiping chose to continue training despite the urging by his parents. After his rigorous training at NPTI, Omiping went into on-the-job training for six months before he stationed to Camp Crame where he was assigned in the Finance department of the Support Service.

Omiping contributed to several championship titles of the Support Service in the inter-department basketball tourney of the PNP. He is also part of the PNP team that played in the PNP-AFP Olympics, aside from his day job.

=== UNTV Cup ===
Omiping, who is a Fiscal Analyst of the PNP Headquarters Support Service, accepted the invitation by former PNP Chief Nicanor Bartolome to play for the PNP team in the first season of UNTV Cup in 2013. UNTV Cup is the first public service-based basketball league in the Philippines. Due to his exemplar performance with the team, Omiping was crowned as the MVP for the first two seasons of the UNTV Cup. He was also named as Best Scorer and Base Shooting Guard in Season 2. Omiping contributed to the team that made it to the finals of the UNTV Cup in Seasons 1, 3 and 4.

== Personal life ==
Olan is married to Sheryl Omiping, where they have two kids, a boy and a girl.
