= Iligan Crusaders =

Basketball team in Iligan City, Philippines

- Leagues: NBC (2004-2007)
- Founded: 2004
- Folded: 2007
- History: Iligan Crusaders; 2004–2007
- Arena: MSU-IIT Gymnasium
- Location: Iligan City, Philippines
- Team colors
- Head coach: Eric Samson
- Championships: 1 (2007 NBC National Cup)

The Iligan Crusaders were a professional basketball team based in Iligan City, Philippines. They play in the Southern Conference of the National Basketball Conference (NBC). The team was owned by former Iligan City Mayor Lawrence Cruz and is managed by then City Councilor, now Congressman Frederick Siao until the disbandment in 2007.

== Home Arena ==
- MSU-IIT Gymnasium (2004–2007)

== History ==
=== 1st season ===
In 2004, Iligan City decided to join the league as an expansion team. He signed Billy Reyes as the head coach of the Iligan Crusaders and acquired key players like, Mark Kong, DonDon Mendoza, Joseph Roque, Adam Baguio and Sammy Ayodelle. The team's hopes in winning the championship were put to a rest when the Ozamiz Cotta knocked them out in the conference finals.

=== 2nd season ===
In the 2005 season, team manager Frederick Siao acquired last season's Most Valuable Player Christian Nicdao, ex-UST Growling Tiger, Frederick Hubalde, ex-UE Red Warrior Ollan Omiping, ex-JRU Heavy Bomber McDonald Santos and former Adamson Falcon Jeff Tajonera, and veterans Melvin Taguines and Marlon Kalaw. Holdovers from their last season squad are Sammy Ayodelle and Dave Sagad and locals Jayzeel Canoy, Completing the strong lineup of Iligan are rookies Ferdie Go, Jerson Espinosa, Rey Sumagang, Miro Pajarilla and alwin ilagan. Despite having a strong start in the season, the Crusaders were unable to win the championship due to their loss to the Iloilo Warriors.

=== 3rd season ===
In the 2007 season, the Crusaders defeated Iloilo in the semi-final of the NBC Cup and faced Ozamiz in the all-Mindanao best of three finals.

In the finals, the Crusaders routed defending champion Ozamiz Cotta in the first game, 88-83 and then escaped the Cotta's comeback in the second game, 81-73 to capture the NBC Cup. It was Iligan's first ever championship in its history, it was the iligan's pride who scored 14 of his 27 pts on that game putting the name Iligan City to history.

== Notes ==
=== Best home game ===
Probably the best home game this year for the Crusaders was when they faced the Ozamiz Cotta on April 25, 2007, on their home floor and won in a 92-90 score on Dino Cabili's last shot with 16 seconds left in regulation.

=== Player additions ===
Midpoint in the season, Frederick Siao signed Nat Cruz and Ian Saladaga who were from the Valencia Golden Harvest. He also signed Ronnie Matias who, after playing in the PBL, signed with the Iligan Crusaders. Matias played for the Iligan Crusaders in the second season of the team.

=== Player subtractions ===
Midpoint in the season, the Crusaders lost 5'10 point guard Arnold Booker Santos for unknown reasons.
