= Quezon–Villa Anita =

- Leagues: NBC (2007–2008)
- Founded: 2007
- Folded: 2008
- History: Quezon–Villa Anita; 2007–2008
- Arena: Quezon Convention Center
- Location: Lucena City, Quezon, Philippines
- Team colors

Quezon–Villa Anita was a Philippines basketball club who joined the National Basketball Conference. The team was spearheaded by ex-PBA players Bryan Gahol and Anastacio 'Robin' Mendoza.
