= MSU-IIT Integrated Developmental School =

Public high school in Iligan, Philippines

- Iligan; Philippines

Information
- Former names: Iligan High School; (1946-1956); Lanao Technical School; (1956-1965); Northern Mindanao Institute of Technology; (1965-1968); Developmental High School; (1968-1992)
- Established: 1946; 80 years ago
- Website: www.iit.edu.ph/academics/colleges/ced/ids/index.php

The Integrated Developmental School (commonly referred to as IDS) is the high school department of the Mindanao State University–Iligan Institute of Technology in Iligan City, Philippines. It was established in 1946 as the Iligan High School (IHS) to respond to the need of the Iligan constituents to have their own high school. Later, it was named Lanao Technical School (LTS) from 1956 to 1967 created under R.A. 1562, a high school specializing vocational and technical courses. Although it never was implemented in 1965, Lanao Technical School became Northern Mindanao Institute of Technology through RA 4626. On July 12, 1968, under R.A. 5363, Lanao Technical School was annexed to Mindanao State University, it was renamed Developmental High School (DHS). At present, under BOR Resolution No. 147 s. 1992, it is known as Integrated Developmental School (IDS), a laboratory school of the College of Education.

Senior high school

Pursuant to Section 16 of Republic Act No. 10533, otherwise known as the Enhanced Basic Education Act of 2013, the Integrated Developmental School opened the Senior High School for academic year 2016-2017. IDS will offer two tracks, namely, the Academic Track and the Technical-Vocational Track. Each of the two tracks being offered is further divided into strands. The Academic Track consists of strands that are geared towards the attainment of a bachelor’s degree, while the Technical-Vocational track includes strands for students who prefer to specialize in skilled technical work immediately after graduation.
