= Limunsudan Falls =

Waterfall in Iligan, Philippines

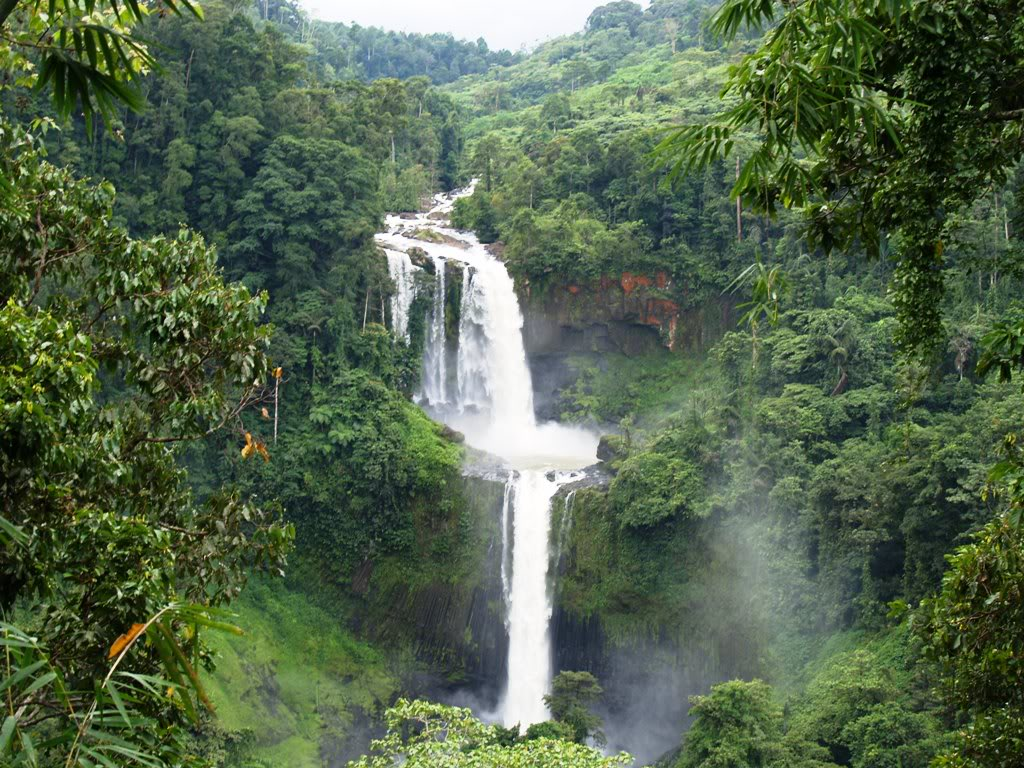
- Interactive map of Limunsudan Falls
- Location: Sitio Limunsudan, Brgy. Rogongon, Iligan City, Philippines
- Coordinates: 8°06′45″N 124°31′25″E
- Type: Plunge
- Total height: 870 feet (270 m)

Limunsudan Falls is a two-tiered waterfall located in Brgy Rogongon, Iligan City, 55 kilometers (34 mi) from Iligan city-proper in the Philippines. It is said to be the Philippines' second highest waterfall, second only to Aliwagwag Falls in Cateel, Davao Oriental.

Areas surrounding the falls have been occupied by immigrants from Kalamlamahan of Barangay Rogongon of Iligan City since 1995, together with Indigenous Higaonon people from the nearby barangays or sitios.

The current and flow of the water is gradually decreasing due to the operations of logging concessionaires in the area since in the 1950s, as well as those of illegal loggers.

== See also ==
- List of waterfalls
