= Dodiongan Falls =

Coordinates: 8°16′17.75″N 124°18′47.4″E

Dodiongan Falls is a 20-metre (65.5 ft) high waterfall located in Barangay Bonbonon, 14 km away from Iligan City in Lanao del Norte province of the Philippines.

== See also ==
- List of waterfalls
