= St. Peter's College (Iligan) =

Private college in Lanao del Norte, Philippines

- Dalubhasang San Pedro (Filipino)
- Motto: Where Your brightest future begins
- Type: Private Non-Sectarian Coeducational basic and higher education institution
- Established: 1952; 74 years ago
- Founders: Miguel D. Paguio; Escolastica Punongbayan-Paguio
- Affiliations: PACUCOA
- President: Danilo G. Punongbayan
- Vice-president: Engr. Perfecto G. Punongbayan
- Chief Executive Officer: Ms. Carmelita A. Punongbayan
- Location: Iligan, Lanao del Norte, Philippines; 8°13′55″N 124°14′11″E
- Campus: Urban
- Colors: Maroon and White
- Website: www.spc.edu.ph
- Location in Mindanao Location in the Philippines

St. Peter's College is a private non-sectarian coeducational basic and higher education institution located in Iligan City, Lanao del Norte, Philippines. It was founded by Miguel D. Paguio and his wife, Escolastica Punongbayan-Paguio on February 10, 1952.

== Basic education ==
- Pre-school
- Kindergarten
- Elementary
- Junior High School
- Senior High School

== Higher education ==
- Bachelor's degree courses
- Master's degree courses

=== Program Offerings ===
Master of Arts in Education

Bachelor of Arts

Bachelor of Elementary Education

Bachelor of Secondary Education

Bachelor of Science in Business Administration

Bachelor of Science in Computer Science

Bachelor of Science in Information Technology

Bachelor of Science in Civil Engineering

Bachelor of Science in Computer Engineering

Bachelor of Science in Computer Science

Bachelor of Science in Electrical Engineering

Bachelor of Science in Electronics & Communications Engineering

Bachelor of Science in Information Technology

Bachelor of Science in Mechanical Engineering

Bachelor of Science in Industrial Engineering

Bachelor of Science in Criminology

Teacher Certificate Program

TESDA Recognized Program:

Bookkeeping NC III
