= DubsteP (gamer) =

Filipino esports player

Personal information
- Name: Jayvee Paguirigan
- Born: Iligan, Philippines
- Nationality: Filipino

Career information
- Games: Valorant; Counter-Strike: Global Offensive
- Playing career: 2015–2024
- Role: Duelist

Jayvee Paguirigan, better known as DubsteP, is a Filipino former professional esports player. He is best known for his career in Valorant, where he competed for teams such as Bren Esports and Team Secret. Prior to switching to Valorant, Paguirigan competed professionally in Counter-Strike: Global Offensive. He retired from competitive play in August 2024.

== Early life and career ==
Paguirigan grew up in Iligan, Philippines. During his youth, he was interested in basketball and played on his high school varsity team. He initially played video games on consoles before transitioning to PC gaming.

Before becoming a full-time esports professional, Paguirigan worked as a software developer for IBM. He competed in CS:GO tournaments during his free time while supporting his family as a breadwinner. After balancing his corporate job and gaming for a year, he resigned from his IT position to join the esports organization Mineski full-time.

== Esports career ==
=== Counter-Strike: Global Offensive ===
Paguirigan began his professional career in Counter-Strike: Global Offensive (CS:GO). He played for Mineski for two years, where the team consistently placed first in Philippine qualifiers. Following his tenure with Mineski, he became a journeyman within the scene, playing for various teams including ArkAngel, Audacity, and the Indonesian team Rex Regum Qeon. Throughout his final two years in CS:GO, he changed teams seven times.

=== Valorant ===
==== Bren Esports (2020–2021) ====
In 2020, Paguirigan transitioned to the tactical shooter Valorant following its release. He joined Bren Esports alongside teammates Kevin "Dispenser" Te and Riley "witz" Go. Although he initially played Sentinel agents like Cypher and Killjoy, his coach moved him to the Duelist role, specifically using the agent Jett, after observing his proficiency with the Operator sniper rifle. The team dominated the local Philippine circuit throughout 2020 and 2021. In 2021, Paguirigan helped Bren Esports win the VCT Southeast Asia Stage 3 Challengers Playoffs. This victory qualified the team for the Valorant Masters Berlin tournament. However, due to travel document and visa complications, the team was unable to attend the event.

==== Team Secret (2021–2023) ====
After his contract with Bren Esports expired in 2021, Paguirigan signed with the European organization Team Secret, joining the same roster he had competed with previously. He made his international debut at the Valorant Champions 2021 in Berlin. During the group stage, Paguirigan helped secure key victories against Japanese squad Crazy Raccoon and Brazilian team Team Vikings, propelling the squad to the playoffs. He recorded a 45–26–4 KDA (Kill/Death/Assist) ratio during the match against Team Vikings. Ultimately, he finished in the 5th–8th place bracket at the tournament, achieving the 8th highest Average Combat Score (ACS) of all players at the event.

In the 2022 season, Paguirigan won the VCT Philippines Stage 2 Challengers with Team Secret. He finished the group stage with a 6–1 record and defeated Oasis Gaming 3–1 in the grand final. During this period, he expanded his agent pool to include Yoru and KAY/O.

In September 2023, Paguirigan announced he had been given permission to explore opportunities as a restricted free agent. On September 19, 2023, Team Secret officially announced his departure. Paguirigan later stated in an interview that he was informed of his release through a Facebook call. He expressed that he felt the team's playstyle had become stagnant and needed to evolve.

==== Retirement ====
Toward the end of his competitive career, Paguirigan played for Oasis Gaming. On August 14, 2024, he officially announced his retirement from competitive Valorant. He stated that he had been competing for nine years and wished to focus on content creation and streaming. He also expressed openness to becoming an assistant coach in the future.

== Player profile ==
Paguirigan was primarily known for playing the Duelist role, specifically the agent Jett. He was noted for his aggressive use of the Operator sniper rifle. In 2021, he described the "Filipino playstyle" as a mixture of European discipline, Korean tactics, and North American chaotic energy.

At the Valorant Champions 2021, he expressed excitement about facing Mehmet "cNed" İpek from team Acend, citing him as an inspiration for his own playstyle. Paguirigan stated that he adjusted his playstyle based on cNed's transition from Sentinel agents to Jett.

== Awards and nominations ==
In January 2022, Paguirigan was named the number one Asian Valorant player of 2021 by Valo2Asia. The award was decided by a panel of 20 judges consisting of casters and analysts. He was also nominated for the "Best Jett Player of the Year" in the 2021 VCT Season All-Pro Team awards.

During the VCT 2022 Philippines Challengers, Paguirigan was named the match MVP in a game against Oasis Gaming, where he recorded an 18–6–2 KDA on the map Split.
