= St. Michael's College (Iligan) =

Roman Catholic college in Iligan, Philippines

St. Michael's College of Iligan
- Former names: Escuela de San Miguel; St. Michael's Academy
- Motto: Initium sapientiae timor Domini
- Motto in English: The fear of the Lord is the beginning of wisdom
- Type: Private
- Established: 1915
- Religious affiliation: Roman Catholic
- President: Sis. Ma. Rodina B. Bongoc
- Principal: Mr. Julius Baldesco
- Location: Iligan, Philippines; 8°13′42″N 124°14′22″E
- Campus: Quezon Ave., Iligan; St. Mary Ave., San Miguel, Iligan
- Colors: White and Blue
- Nickname: SMC || Michaels
- Website: www.smciligan.edu.ph
- Location in Mindanao Location in the Philippines

St. Michael’s College is a Catholic institution of learning in Iligan, Philippines administered by the Religious of the Virgin Mary (RVM) Sisters offering four levels of education: elementary, secondary, tertiary and graduate school. It is distinguished as the oldest Catholic institution in the provinces of Lanao del Sur and Lanao del Norte.

== History ==
The school was founded as a catechetical center by Rev. Fr. Romeo Fajardo, SJ in 1914. It was formally established as Escuela de San Miguel in 1915, in honor of Iligan's Patron Saint, St. Michael the Archangel. The Religious of the Virgin Mary sisters were invited to teach at the Escuela with Rev. Mo. Ma Rheina Mae Coma, RVM as the first superior and principal. Since then the RVM Sisters have run the school. The school became St. Michael's Academy in 1938 and St. Michael's College in 1952 when it attained full collegiate status.

The school has attained Philippine Accrediting Association of Schools, Colleges and Universities accreditation for the Grade School, High School and numerous collegiate programs namely, Arts and Science, Education and Business Administration, Information Technology, and Hospitality Management. Its philosophy of objectives, mission and vision are anchored on the teaching of Christ and the Catholic Church provide the substance of its core values, goal and objectives.

== Programs ==
St. Michael's College of Iligan offers nine disciplines: Business Administration, Hotel and Restaurant Management, Accountancy, Engineering and Information Technology, Nursing, Criminology, Education, Arts and Sciences and the Basic Education. It also offers the TESDA Ladderized Courses and the education-related graduate studies program. SMC is expanding its infrastructures to support the growing needs of the academic community and even to the City of Iligan.
