= Demosthenes Dingcong =

Demosthenes "Demy" Dingcong, was a Filipino Journalist who served as Lanao provincial correspondent of theBulletin Today and is honored as a Martyr of the resistance to the Marcos dictatorship at the Philippines' Bantayog ng mga Bayani.

Dingcong was one of numerous journalists killed during the dictatorship of Ferdinand Marcos Sr. from 1965 to 1986. He was shot by an unidentified gunman in his house in Iligan, Lanao del Norte on December 5, 1980 after having written exposés about anomalies in the local government activities. His coverage included that on the missing fund intended for the students of Mindanao State University; military abuses; and the situation of the political prisoners in the province. He had already received threats from local officials.
