= Adventist Medical Center College – Iligan =

Christian college in Lanao del Norte, Philippines

Adventist Medical Center College - Iligan, Inc.
- Other names: CMAFI, MSHC, AMC College
- Former names: Mindanao Sanitarium and Hospital College, Inc.
- Motto: "Keeps Shining"
- Type: Private
- Established: February 8, 1994
- Religious affiliation: Seventh-day Adventist
- Academic affiliations: ACSCU
- Location: Iligan City, Philippines; 8°17′22″N 124°23′53″E
- Campus: 3 hectares (7.4 acres)
- Colors: Green and white
- Website: www.amcc.edu.ph
- Location in Mindanao Location in the Philippines

The Adventist Medical Center College - Iligan, Inc. (also known as AMCC), formerly the Mindanao Sanitarium and Hospital College, is one of the colleges of the Seventh-day Adventist Churchlocated in Iligan City, Lanao del Norte, Philippines. It provides education from basic education to college, with a strong emphasis on healthcare, academic excellence, Christian values, and service to humanity.

Location: Andres Bonifacio Avenue area, San Miguel, Iligan City, Philippines.

Educational Programs: AMCC offers Junior High School (Grades 7–10), Senior High School (Grades 11–12) and college programs.

Senior High School Academic Tracks: Business and Entrepreneurship (BE)

Arts, Social Sciences and Humanities (ASSH)

Pre-Allied Health Sciences (PHS)

College Programs:

Bachelor of Science in Nursing (BSN)

Bachelor of Science in Physical Therapy (BSPT)

Bachelor of Science in Radiologic Technology (BSRT)

Bachelor of Science in Medical Technology (BSMT)

Bachelor of Science in Pharmacy (BSPharm)

Bachelor of Science in Nutrition and Dietetics (BSND)

Bachelor of Elementary Education (BEEd)

Bachelor of Secondary Education (BSEd)

== i ==
Establishing a college of medial arts was conceived when the administrators of Mindanao Sanitarium and Hospital felt the need for paramedical workers in the hospital. With the shortage of Adventist paramedical workers, particularly in the area of physical therapy, radiology, midwifery and other related fields and with the trends in the tertiary level of education, the MSH Board dreamed to establish a paramedical school in Iligan City. This school would offer courses and training programs in paramedical lines to talented young people of different religious affiliations and regional groups, especially the Seventh-day Adventist youth in Southern Philippines.

Under the Leadership of Joel Y. Dalaguan, Dr. Lorenzo S. Lacson Jr., and Cholita Suasi, the requirements set by the then Department of Education, Culture and Sports for a college status were accomplished. On February 8, 1994, a temporary permit was granted for the School of Midwifery. A year later, March 10, 1995, the School of Midwifery was granted recognition.

On June 6, 1994, the DECS issued a permit to open first year level of the School of Physical Therapy. Thus, the institution gained the distinction of being the first Seventh-day Adventist College of Medical Arts in the Philippines to offer a course leading to a recognized degree in BS Physical Therapy.

The new college opened on June 13, 1994, in the campus of Mindanao Sanitarium and Hospital with the first batch of 19 midwifery and 88 physical therapy students. The working force was composed of five full-time and six part-time faculty members. The administrators were Joel Y. Dalaguan as president, Dr. Gladden O. Flores as academic dean, Merlyn A. Maquilan as registrar, Dinah W. Almocera and Roselyn A Senas as deans of Physical Therapy and Midwifery, respectively.

The facilities like classrooms, library, laboratories, and offices were in the old elementary school building inside the MSH campus, while a new big building was going to be constructed. Members of the College Board, administrators, faculty, and students attended the groundbreaking ceremony held at the old tennis court on October 20, 1994.
