= Mount Agad-Agad =

Mountain in Iligan, Philippines

Mount Agad‑Agad
- Location within Mindanao mainland Location within Philippines

Highest point
- Elevation: 490 m (1,610 ft)
- Coordinates: 8°10′45.84″N 124°17′23.64″E

Geography
- Location: Mindanao
- Country: Philippines
- Region: Northern Mindanao
- Province: Lanao del Norte
- City/municipality: Iligan

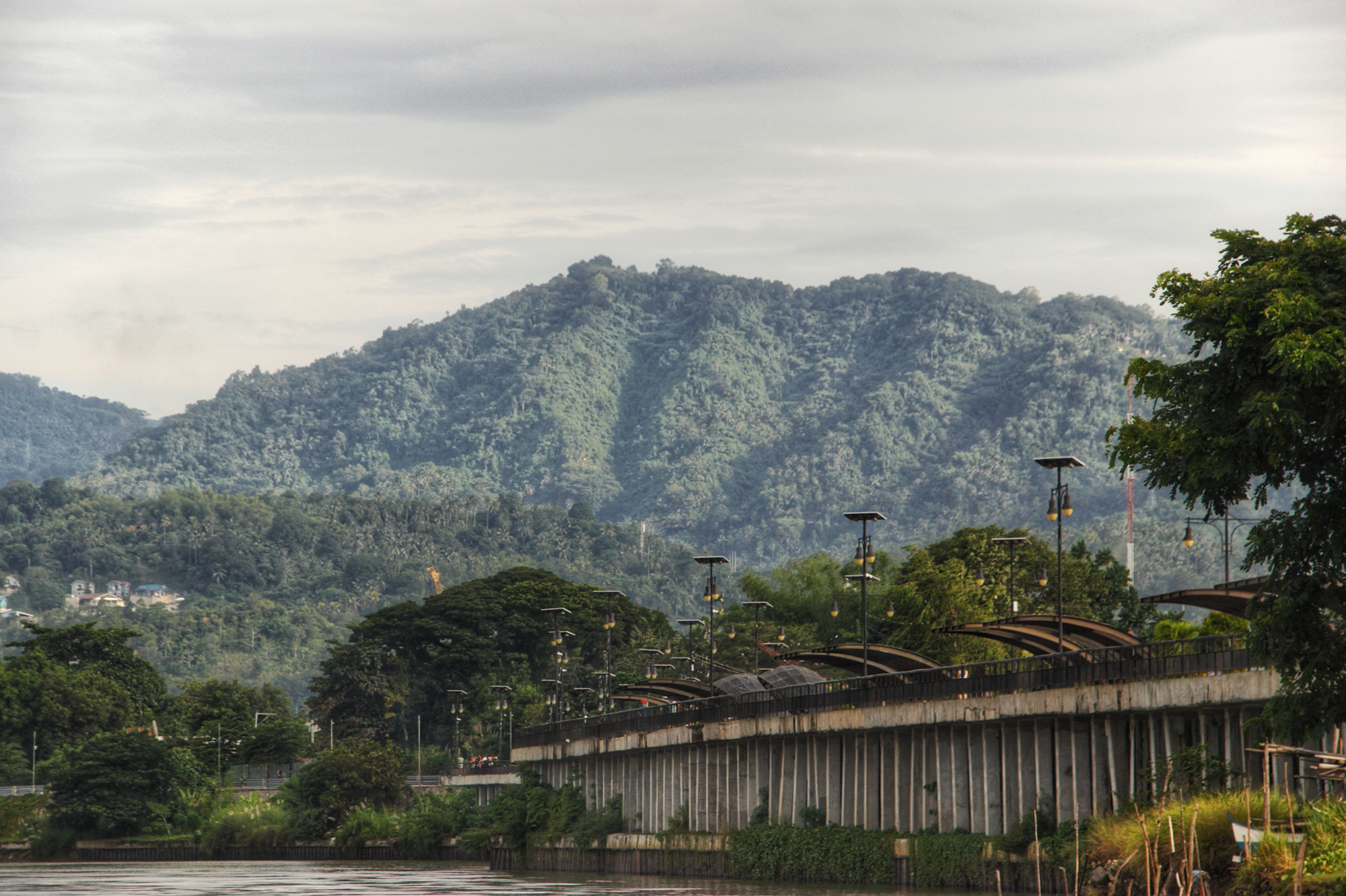
Agad-Agad and Bayug Esplanade in one image, taken by Gabriel Pracuelles at Bayug Island.

Mount Agad-Agad is a low massif mountain located in Iligan City in the Philippines which has an estimated height 1,610 feet (490 m) above sea level. It offers a steep, rewarding assault climb that remains surprisingly beginner-friendly for mountain hikers.

Agad-Agad is easily accessible for overnight camping. It offers a panoramic view of Iligan City by both day and night, as well as vistas of surrounding peaks, including Mount Malindang, Mount Inayawan, Mount Malindawag, and Mount Turong-Turong.
