= National Basketball Conference =

Basketball league in the Philippines

- Sport: Basketball
- Founded: 2004
- Folded: 2008
- Motto: "Ang Liga ng Bayan" (The League of the Nation)
- Country: Philippines
- Last champion: Iligan Crusaders

The National Basketball Conference was a regional-based basketball league in the Philippines formed in 2004. The league was sanctioned by the Philippine national sport association for basketball, the Samahang Basketbol ng Pilipinas. Teams were sponsored by the local government. In 2008, it merged with the Mindanao Visayas Basketball Association (MVBA) and Third Force Inc. (TFI) to form the new Liga Pilipinas.

== History ==
After the Metropolitan Basketball Association (MBA) folded up in 2002, the clamor for a regional basketball did not die down.

Several leagues with the community-based concept started to surface but none of them lasted.

On such league was the National Basketball League (NBL), owned and operated by the Basketball Association of the Philippines (BAP), the former Philippine basketball governing body.

In 2003, the BAP had asked the NBL group to give back the "National Basketball League" name and rights to the BAP. The NBL officials did so, regrouped, and came up with a new name: the National Basketball Conference, a league totally independent of the BAP.

In 2004, the NBC played its first season with 8 teams participating, forming two divisions, Northern (Baguio Cardinals, Forward Taguig, Laguna Springs and Batangas 29ers) and Southern (Iloilo Warriors, Tribu Sugbu-Cebu, Cagayan de Oro Stars, Ozamiz Cotta). It still adopted the MBA's Home and Away format, but introduced the "Road Swing" wherein which cross-division contests required a team to tackle all its opposition in one road trip (usually lasting a little more than one week). This formula was drawn up by then Basketball Operations chief Noel Zarate, who was also the voice behind the original NBC broadcasts. The opening game featured a matchup between the visiting Iloilo Warriors against the Cagayan de Oro Stars. The game went into double overtime with the visitors prevailing 114–110. Iloilo's Carlos Sayon registered 30 points in the win. Tribu Sugbo (then owned by businessmen Lito Gillamac and Albert Tan and coached by former PBA player Al Solis) defeated Forward Taguig (owned by Taguig Freddie Tinga and coached by former FEU mentor Danny Gavieres) in a thrilling three-game series to cop the first NBC National Championship. Egay Echavez of Ozamiz was the first league MVP.

In 2005, new teams joined the league that included the Parañaque Jets, who made headlines by defeating the Basketball Association of the Philippines-sponsored RP-Cebuana Lhuillier Team in the NBC Preseason tournament. The Jets, though, failed to make the playoffs as the Ozamiz Cotta won the championship.

For the 2006 season, a new expansion team joined the league, Pagadian Explorers of Mayor Sammy S. Co. The tournament was divided into two conferences, similar to the format used by the Philippine Basketball Association and the Philippine Basketball League. Ozamiz Cotta won the first conference title in Game 3 against the expansion team Pagadian Explorers, the first ever expansion team in league history to reach finals, while the second conference is also won by Ozamiz Cotta via sweep against the Batang Tagaytay Springs.

For the 2007 season, a new team joined the league, GenSan-MP Pacman Warriors of boxing legend Manny "Pacman" Pacquiao from General Santos. The League has its TV partners the 24-hour Basketball TV and Viva Prime Channel.

In 2008, it merged with the Mindanao Visayas Basketball Association (MVBA), and Third Force Inc. (TFI) to form the new Liga Pilipinas.

== Teams ==
=== (Last NBC season 2007) ===
Team	Season joined	Location	Owner	Home Court
Ozamiz Cotta	2004	Ozamiz	Reynaldo Parojinog	Gov. Angel N. Medina, Sr. Gymnatorium
Batang Tagaytay-Tagaytay Springs	2005	Tagaytay	Abraham "Bambol" Tolentino; Nathaniel "Tac" Padilla	Tolentino Sports Center
Pagadian Explorers	2006	Pagadian	Mayor Samuel Co	ZSPCTA Gymnasium
Valencia-Golden Harvest	2006	Valencia	Mayor Jose M. Galario Jr.	Valencia City Gymnasium
Toyota-Iloilo Warriors	2004	Iloilo City	Robert Uy	University of San Agustin Gymnasium
Davao Montaña Pawnshop Jewels	2006	Davao City	Armand Quibod	N/A
Quezon-Villa Anita	2007	Lucena	Gov. Wilfredo Enverga	Quezon Convention Center
Iligan Crusaders	2004	Iligan	Mayor Lawrence Cruz	MSU-IIT Gymnasium
GenSan MP Pacman Warriors	2007	General Santos	Manny Pacquiao	South Cotabato Sports Center/Lagao Gymnasium

== Other teams ==
- Parañaque Jets
- Baguio Cardinals/Lions
- Forward Taguig
- Laguna Springs
- Laguna Pistons
- Batangas 29ers
- Tribu Sugbu-Cebu
- Cagayan de Oro Stars
- Arthro Kontra Arthritis-Cebu
- Osmena-Cebu
- Harbour Centre-Bacchus-Manila
- Mandaue (Mantawi) Sparkling Knights
- Zamboanga del Norte (ZaNorte) Hornbills
- Zamboanga Latinos
- North Cotabato Braves

== Teams competed during NBL era ==
- M.Lhuillier Kwarta Padala-Cebu Niños
- Compak-Shineway-Ozamiz Cotta
- Ilocos Sur Snipers
- Grachiya-Adamson Falcons
- Spring Cooking Oil-Malabon
- Forward Taguig
- Mail and More-Restolax-MayniLA
- Pampanga Bulls/Sulpicio Lines-Pampanga
- Spring Cooking Oil-Sta. Rosa Seven Lakers

== Officers ==
- President
  - Nathaniel “Tac” Padilla (Olympian and owner of Spring Oil)
- Vice President
  - Bambol Tolentino
- Secretary-General
  - Tito Palma (former commissioner of NBL)

== Notable players ==
- Raffy Dalino (Laguna Springs)
- Nelson Asaytono (Pagadian Explorers) (former PBA player)
- Robin Mendoza (Quezon-Villa Anita) (former PBA player)
- John Laborte (Toyota-Iloilo Warriors)
- Marlon Legaspi (Osmena-Cebu) (former PBA player)
- Britt Reroma (Bacchus-Harbour Centre-Manila)
- Elbert Alberto (Pagadian Explorers)
- Ruel Bravo (North Cotabato Braves) (former PBA player)
- Romulo Marata (Iligan Crusaders)
- Nathaniel Cruz (Iligan Crusaders/Valencia Golden Harvest)
- Ian Saladaga (Iligan Crusaders/Valencia Golden Harvest)
- Ferdinand Go (Iligan Crusaders) (former PBL player)
- Ollan Omiping (Bacchus-Harbour Centre-Manila/Iligan Crusaders)
- Christian Nicdao (Ozamiz Cotta/Iligan Crusaders) (former PBA player)
- Marlon Kalaw (Laguna Springs/Tagaytay Springs/Iligan Crusaders)
- Carlos Sayon (Toyota-Iloilo Warriors) (former MBA Player)
- Egay Echavez (Ozamiz Cotta) (former PBA/MBA player)
- Marvin Poloyapoy (Montana Pawnshop-Davao)
- John Gonzaga (Montana Pawnshop-Davao)
- Apol Coronado (MP PacMan-Gensan Warriors)
- Bruce Dacia (Tribu Sugbu-Cebu) (former PBA/MBA player)
- Mark Ababon (Tribu Sugbu-Cebu)

and many others

== NBC champions ==
- 2004: Tribu Sugbu
- 2005: Ozamiz Cotta
- 2006:
  - First Conference: Ozamiz Cotta
  - Second Conference: Ozamiz Cotta
- 2007:
  - National Cup: Iligan Crusaders

== Media coverage ==
National Basketball Conference games were broadcast via Basketball TV and Prime Channel.
