= Iligan =

Highly-urbanized city in Northern Mindanao, Philippines

- Highly urbanized city
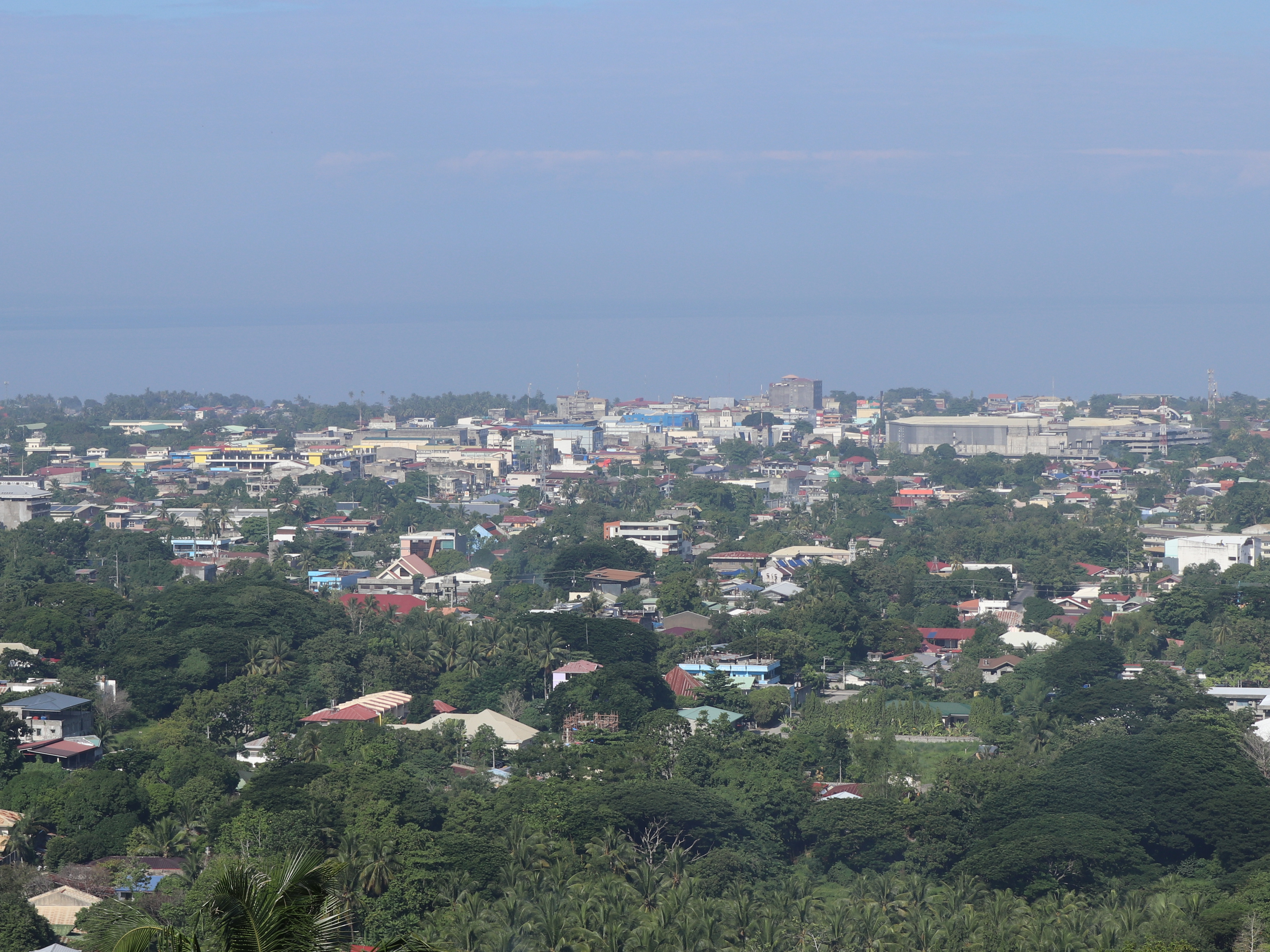
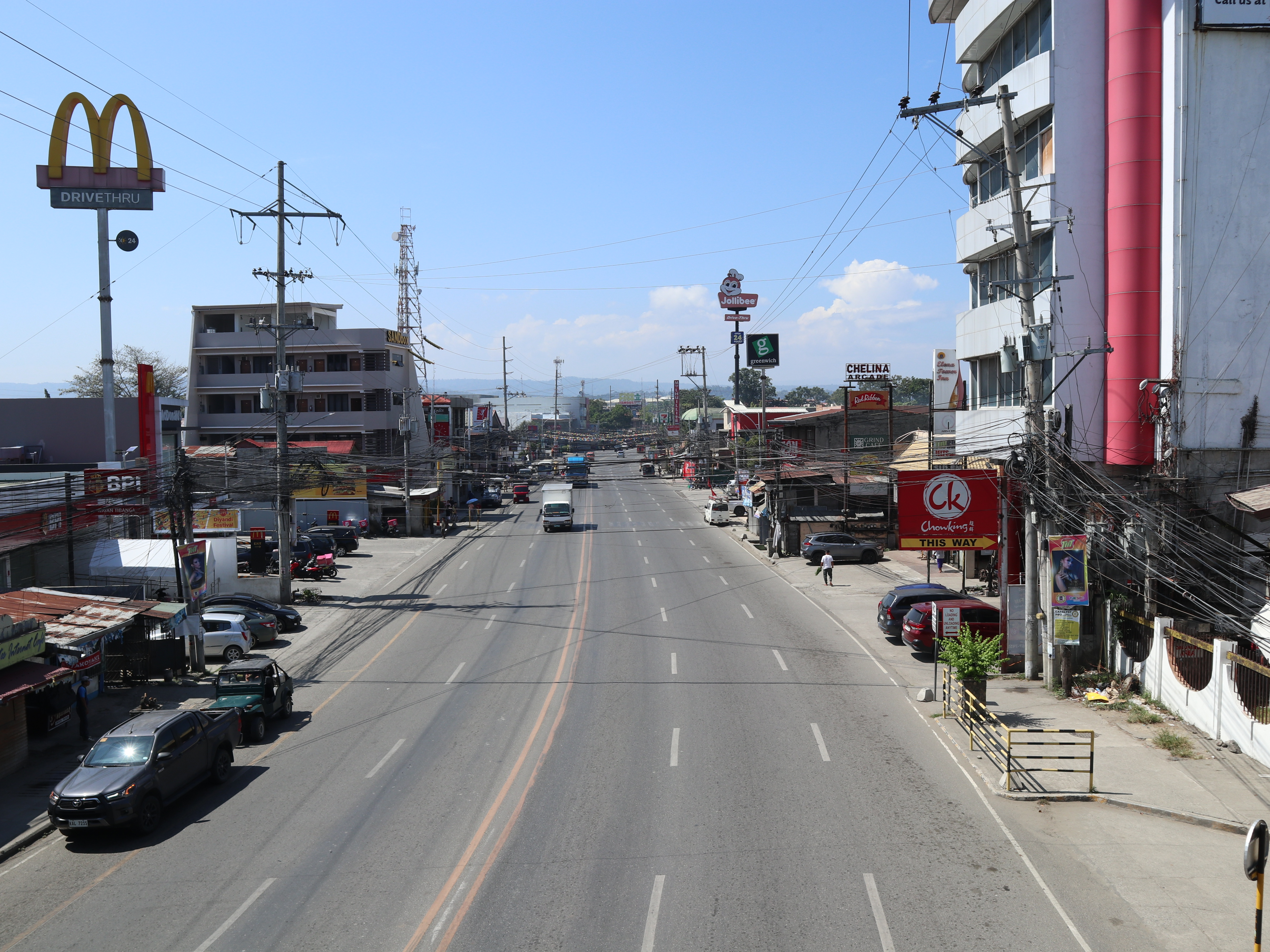
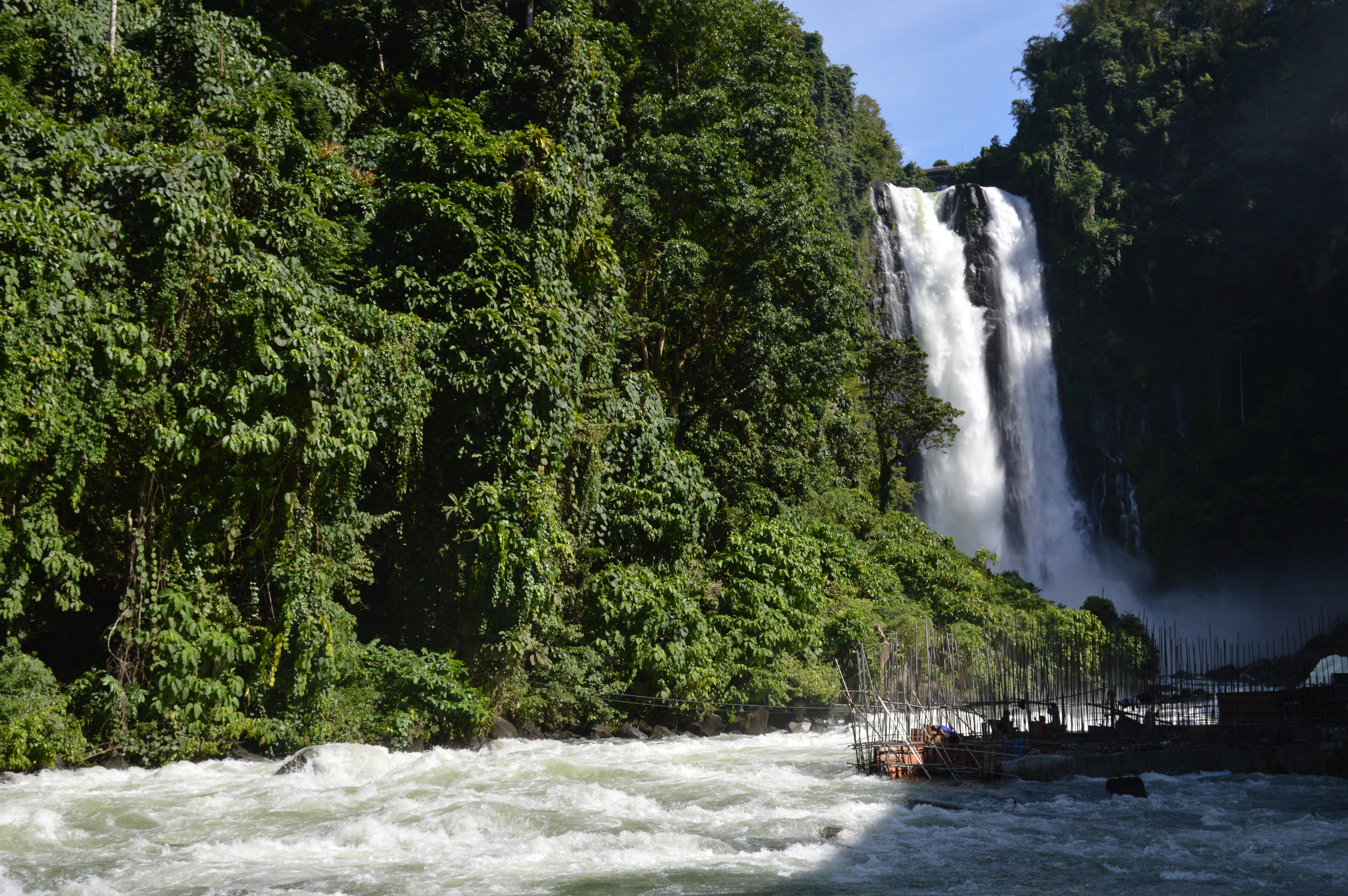
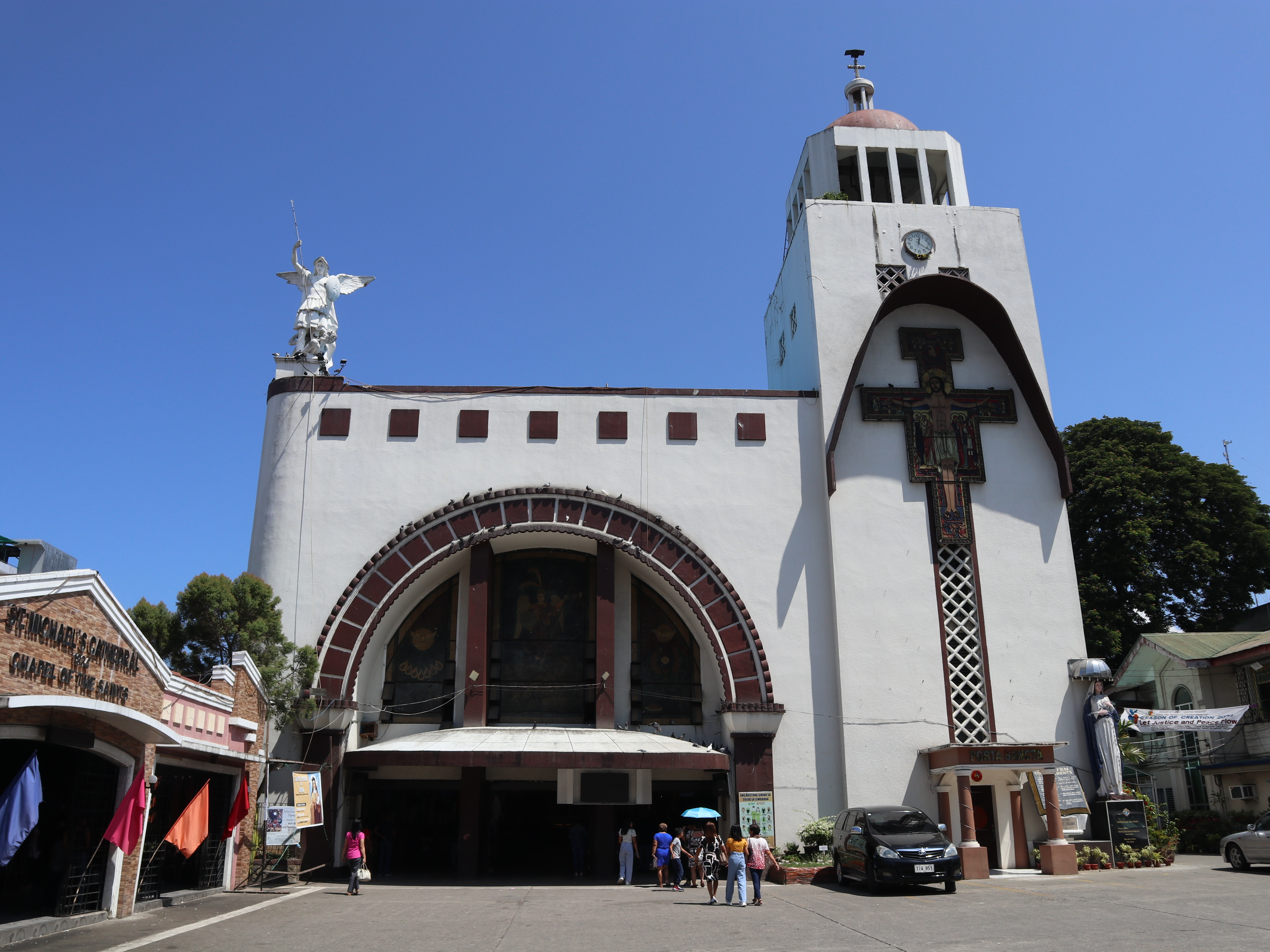
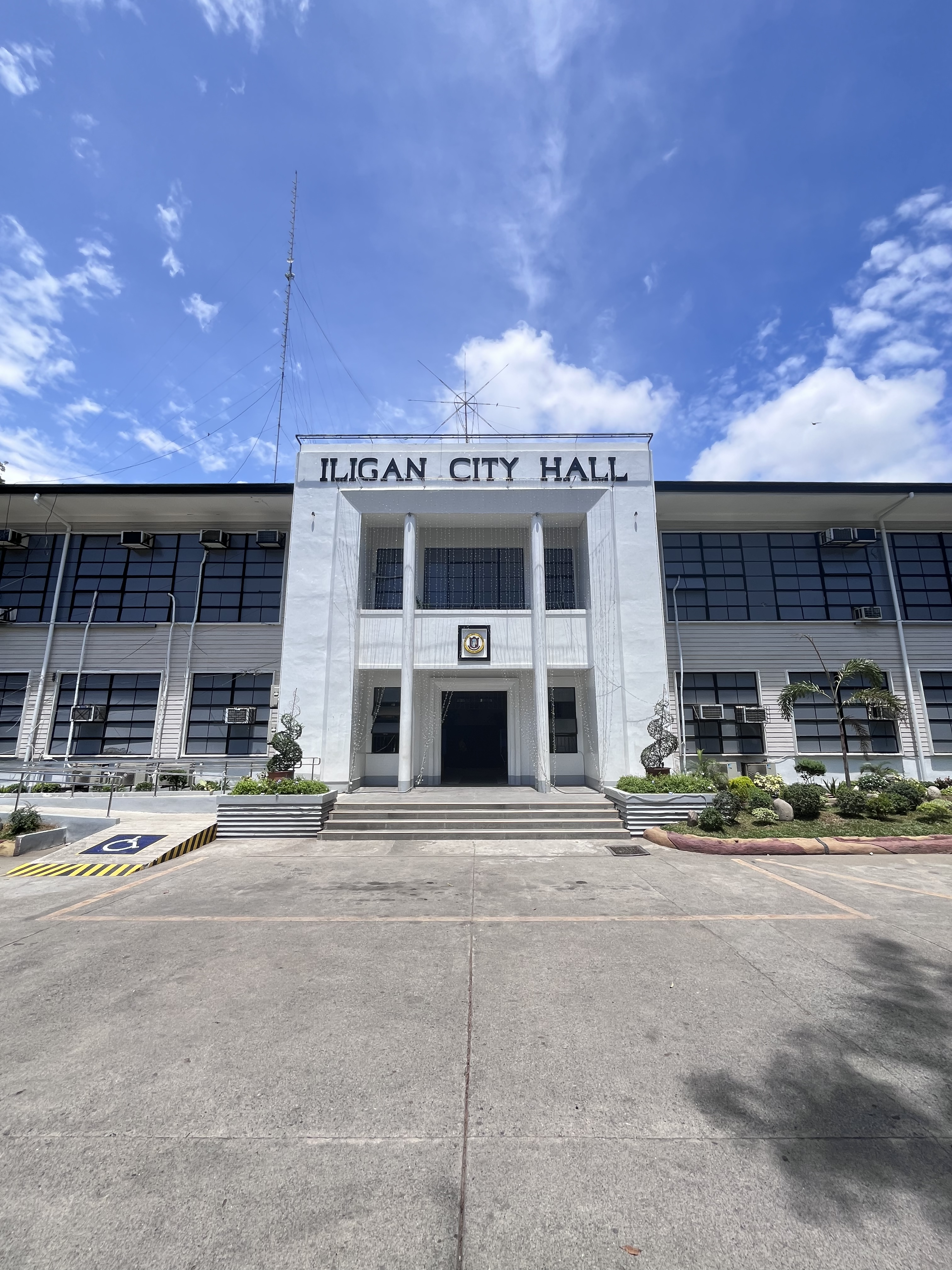
- Skyline of Iligan from Mount Lelong, pictured in 2023 Andres Bonifacio Avenue Maria Cristina Falls Saint Michael's Cathedral Iligan City Hall

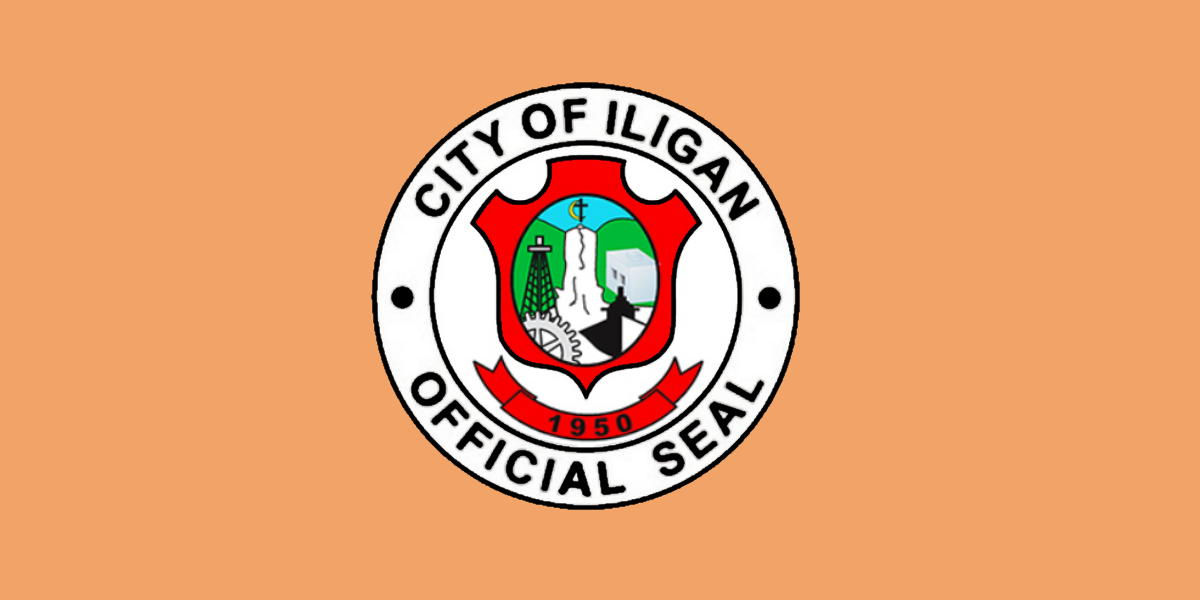
- Flag Seal
- Nicknames: The Industrial Center of the South; City of Majestic Waterfalls
- Anthem: Martsa Iliganon (English: Iligan March)
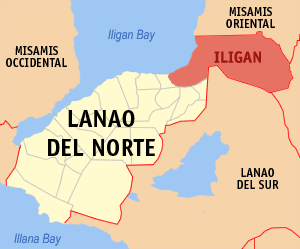
- Map of Northern Mindanao with Iligan highlighted
- Interactive map of Iligan
- Location within the Philippines
- Coordinates: 8°14′N 124°15′E
- Country: Philippines
- Region: Northern Mindanao
- Province: Lanao del Norte (geographically only)
- District: Lone district
- Founded: 1609
- Chartered: 1914
- Cityhood: June 16, 1950
- Highly urbanized city: November 22, 1983
- Barangays: 44 (see Barangays)

Government
  - Type: Sangguniang Panlungsod
  - Mayor: Frederick Wee Siao
  - Vice Mayor: Ernest Oliver “Wekwek” C. Uy (PMP)
  - Representative: Ret. Police Col. Celso G. Regencia (Lakas)
  - City Council: Members: Bernard Y. Pacaña; Simplicio N. Larrazabal III; Rosevi Queenie C. Belmonte; Michelle E. Sweet; Samuel P. Huertas; Providencio A. Abragan Jr.; Jesse Ray N. Balanay; Rhandy Ryan Francis A. Ong; Marlene L. Young; Ramil C. Emborong; Ma. Paz Teresa Zalsos-Uychiat; Nhicolle B. Capangpangan
  - Electorate: 189,050 voters (2025)

Area
  - Total: 813.37 km^{2} (314.04 sq mi)
- Elevation: 262 m (860 ft)
- Highest elevation: 1,195 m (3,921 ft)
- Lowest elevation: 0 m (0 ft)

Population (2024 census)
  - Total: 368,132
  - Density: 452.60/km^{2} (1,172.2/sq mi)
  - Households: 87,239
- Demonym: Iliganon

Economy
  - Gross domestic product: ₱77.015 billion (2022) $1.36 billion (2022)
  - Income class: 1st city income class
  - Poverty incidence: 15.9% (2023)
  - Revenue: ₱ 3,031 million (2024)
  - Assets: ₱ 13,377 million (2024)
  - Expenditure: ₱ 3,367 million (2024)

Service provider
  - Electricity: Iligan Light and Power Incorporated (ILPI)
  - Water: Iligan City Waterworks System
- Time zone: UTC+8 (PST)
- ZIP code: 9200
- PSGC: 103504000
- IDD : area code: +63 (0)63
- Native languages: Cebuano
- Major religions: Roman Catholicism, Islam
- Website: www.iligan.gov.ph

Iligan, officially the City of Iligan (Cebuano: Dakbayan sa Iligan; Binukid: Ciudad ta Iligan; Maranao: Bandar a Iligan; Filipino: Lungsod ng Iligan), is a highly urbanized city in the region of Northern Mindanao, Philippines. According to the 2024 census, it has a population of 368,132 people.

It is the largest city in the province of Lanao del Norte both in population and land area wherein it is geographically situated and grouped under the province by the Philippine Statistics Authority, but administered independently from the province and it is also the second largest city in Northern Mindanao after Cagayan de Oro. It was once part of Central Mindanao (Region 12) until the province was moved under Northern Mindanao (Region 10) in 2001. Iligan is approximately 90 kilometers (56 mi) away from the capital of the province, Tubod, and approximately 800 kilometers (500 mi) from Manila, the capital of the Philippines.

Iligan has a total land area of 813.37 square kilometres (314.04 sq mi), making it one of the 10 largest cities in the Philippines in terms of land area. Among the 33 highly urbanized cities of the Philippines, Iligan is the third-least dense, with a population density of 421 inhabitants per square kilometer (1,090/sq mi), just behind Lucena and Puerto Princesa.

== Etymology ==
The name Iligan is from the Higaonon (Lumad peoples; natives of Iligan) word ilig which means 'to go downstream'. However, some also claim that the name of Iligan was taken and inspired by the Higaonon term iligan or ilijan, which means 'fortress of defense', an appropriate term due to frequent attacks incurred by pirates as well as other Mindanao tribes.

== History ==
=== Higaonon Manobo settlement of Bayug ===
Iligan was first settled by Higaonon Manobos on Bayug island, now in Barangay Hinaplanon, four kilometers (2.5 mi) north of the present city center. It was a settlement of sea dwellers.

In Dapitan, Datu Pagbuaya of Panglao received the Spaniard Miguel Lopez de Legazpi's agents in 1565. Later, Pagbuaya's son Manooc was baptized as Don Pedro Manuel Manooc. Sometime afterward by the end of the 16th century, Manooc subdued the Higaonon Manobo settlement of Bayug and turned it into one of the earliest Christian settlements in the Philippines.

=== Spanish rule ===
Although Bayug survived other raids from other enemies, especially Muslims from Lanao, the early settlers and Christian converts moved their settlement from Bayug to Iligan, which the Augustinian Recollects founded in 1609. During Christianization, the Spaniards in Iligan received a hundred Spanish soldiers as colonists and protection forces.

The Jesuits replaced the Recollects in 1639. Iligan was the Spaniards' base of operations in attempting to conquer and Christianize the Lake Lanao area throughout its history. A stone fort called Fort St. Francis Xavier was built in 1642 where Iliganons sought refuge during raids by bandits. But the fort sank due to floods. Another fort was built and this was named Fort Victoria or Cota de Iligan.

In 1850, because of floods, Don Remigio Cabili, then Iligan's gobernadorcillo, built another fort and moved the poblacion of the old Iligan located at the mouth of Tubod River west of the old market to its present site.

Being the oldest town in Northern Mindanao, Iligan was already a part of the once undivided Misamis Province by the year 1832. However, it did not have an independent religious administration because its diocese by then was based at Misamis, the provincial capital. It was one of the biggest municipalities of Misamis Province.

The Spaniards abandoned Iligan in 1899, paving the way for the landing of the American forces in 1900.

=== American rule ===
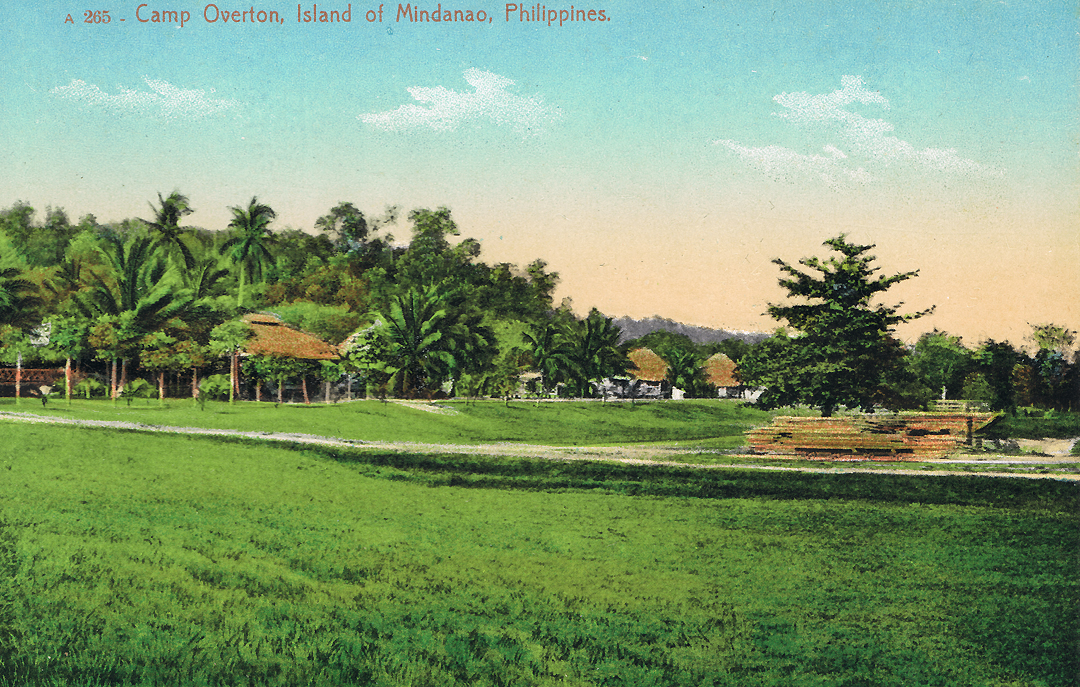
U.S. army camp Overton in Iligan in 1900

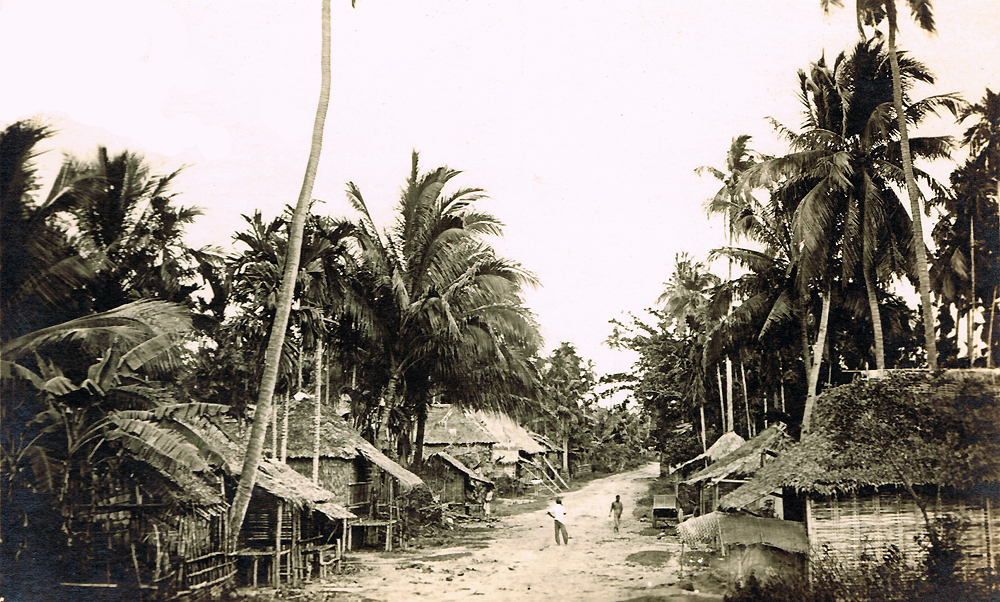
Iligan, c. 1903-1913

In 1903, the Moro Province was created. Iligan, because of its Moro residents, was taken away from the Misamis Province. Then, Iligan became the capital of the Lanao District and the seat of the government where the American officials lived and held office. Later in 1907, the capital of the Lanao District has transferred to Dansalan.

In 1914, under the restructuring of Moroland after the end of the Moro Province (1903–1913), Iligan became a municipality composed of eight barrios together with the municipal district of Mandulog. After enjoying peace and prosperity for about 40 years, Iligan was invaded by Japanese forces in 1942.

The liberation of Iligan by the Philippine Commonwealth forces attacked by the Japanese held sway in the city until 1944 to 1945 when the war ended. On November 15, 1944, the city held a Commonwealth Day parade to celebrate the end of Japanese atrocities and occupation.

=== Establishment of the Iligan Steel Mill ===
The Iligan Steel Mill was established in 1952 as a government-initiated project of the National Shipyards and Steel Corporation (NASSCO). After NASSCO applied for a $62.3 million loan from the United States–based Eximbank to fund projects, the latter suggested a transfer of the facilities' management to the private entity. The company was sold in 1963 to Iligan Integrated Steel Mills, Inc. of the Jacinto family.

=== Cityhood ===
Using the same territorial definition as a municipality, Iligan became a chartered city of Lanao del Norte on June 16, 1950 by virtue of Republic Act No. 525. The bill was authored by then congressman of Lanao, Mohammad Ali Dimaporo, who was protege to the late Senator Tomas Ll. Cabili.

It was declared a first-class city in 1969 and was reclassified as First Class City "A" on July 1, 1977, by virtue of Presidential Decree No. 465. In 1983, Iligan was again reclassified as a highly urbanized city.

=== Rising conflicts during the late 1960s ===
The election of Ferdinand Marcos as President of the Philippines saw a large influx of Christian groups settling in Mindanao, displacing many locals and resulting in numerous land ownership conflicts. The Marcos administration encouraged these new settlers to form militias, which were eventually nicknamed the Ilaga. The Ilaga were often associated with committed human rights abuses targeted at the Moro and Lumad people. This resulted in a lingering animosity and a cycle of violence between Moro and Christian communities which still persists today. Despite this local violence, prominent Moro thought leaders were mostly not politically active until the news of the 1968 Jabidah massacre ignited the Moro insurgency. Reports of Moro men being recruited into the Philippine Army and then being massacred when they had a dispute with their commanding officers led to the conviction that Moros were being treated as second class citizens. Ethnic tensions arising from this led to the formation of secessionist political movements, such as Cotabato Governor Datu Udtog Matalam's Muslim Independence Movement and Lanao del Sur congressman Haroun al-Rashid Lucman's Bangsamoro Liberation Organization. Additionally, the 1969 Philippine balance of payments crisis led to social unrest throughout the country, and violent crackdowns on protests led to the radicalization of many students, with some joining the New People's Army, bringing the New People's Army rebellion to Mindanao for the first time.

=== Iligan during martial law and Marcos administration ===
Towards the end of the last term allowed to him by the Philippine Constitution, Marcos placed the Philippines under martial law in 1972, which had the effect of further increasing tensions in Mindanao. It marked the beginning of a 14-year period of one-man rule, historically remembered for its human rights abuses In Iligan, two military facilities were maintained. In addition, the Philippine Army Brigade was encamped in Camp Climaco Pintoy in Barangay Maria Cristina and the Philippine Constabulary established Camp Tomas Cabili as its local headquarters in Tipanoy, Iligan City. This historical period saw numerous human rights violations in various locations within Iligan. One incident documented by a 1975 fact finding mission of Amnesty International documented the killing of twelve detainees, which was staged to make it look like a prison break. A witness was detained without a warrant at the time, and was regularly subjected to torture and forced labor.

The proclamation of martial law also escalated the Moro secessionism by banning political parties and organizations. The formal establishment of the Moro National Liberation Front (MNLF) one month after Marcos' proclamation of martial law thus marked a shift to a militarization phase of the Moro conflict, with MNLF taking in the members of the former BMLO, and attracting members who had become dissatisfied with the MIM. Lanao del Sur and Iligan itself were deeply affected by the conflict, with the Armed Forces of the Philippines' conflicts with MNLF and its later splinter group the Moro Islamic Liberation Front (MILF) affecting combatants and civilians alike.

Aside from political groups, Marcos' proclamation of martial law also shuttered press outlets - television stations, national newspapers, weekly magazines, community newspapers, and radio stations - throughout the country, including in Iligan and Lanao del Sur. The 14 years of the Marcos dictatorship saw the killings of many Mindanao journalists, with prominent examples being Bulletin Today Lanao provincial correspondent Demosthenes Dingcong, Philippine Post Iligan correspondent and radio commentator Geoffrey Siao, and DXWG Iligan commentator Charlie Aberilla.

Numerous activists arose from Iligan during the 1970s, despite significant personal risks. These included Iligan natives such as prominent nurse empowerment advocate Minda Luz Quesada (who would later be invited to the Philippines' 1987 Constitutional Convention); Electrical workers' union leader David S. Borja; religious youth organizer Edwin Laguerder; activist professor and writer Ester Kintanar of the MSU-Iligan Institute of Technology; and even activist politicians such as Masiding Alonto Sr., who was a prominent supporter of opposition leader Ninoy Aquino. Some of these activists were eventually killed in the pursuit of their beliefs, including farm workers organizers James Orbe and Herbert Cayunda.

Dingcong, Quezada, Borja, Kintanar, Laguerder, Alonto Sr., Orbe, and Cayunda were all later recognized by having their names inscribed on the Wall of Remembrance of the Philippines' Bantayog ng mga Bayani, which honors those who fought for the restoration of democracy and against the authoritarian regime of the time.

=== 1997 Asian financial crisis ===
During the 1997 Asian financial crisis, Iligan City experienced a severe economic slowdown. A number of industrial plants were closed, most notably the National Steel Corporation.

The city began to see some economic recovery with the reopening of the National Steel Corporation, which was renamed Global Steelworks Infrastructures, Inc. (GSII) in 2004.

As of 2025 the plant is still closed.

=== Lone district ===
Republic Act No. 9724, an Act separating the City of Iligan from the First Legislative District of the Province of Lanao del Norte, was approved by President Gloria Macapagal-Arroyo on October 20, 2009. This legislative change elevated Iligan to the status of a lone congressional district, providing it with greater political autonomy and representation.

== Geography ==
Iligan is bounded on the north by three municipalities of Misamis Oriental (namely Lugait, Manticao and Opol), to the south by three municipalities of Lanao del Norte (Balo-i, Linamon and Tagoloan) and two municipalities of Lanao del Sur (Kapai and Tagoloan II), to the north-east by the city of Cagayan de Oro, to the east by the municipality of Talakag, Bukidnon; and to the west by Iligan Bay.

To the west, Iligan Bay provides ferry and container ship transportation. East of the city, flat cultivated coastal land gives way to steep volcanic hills and mountains providing the waterfalls and cold springs for which the area is well known.

=== Climate ===
Climate data for Iligan, Philippines
Month	Jan	Feb	Mar	Apr	May	Jun	Jul	Aug	Sep	Oct	Nov	Dec	Year
Record high °C (°F)	30.6 (87.1)	30.9 (87.6)	31.8 (89.2)	32.8 (91.0)	32.7 (90.9)	32.2 (90.0)	31.9 (89.4)	32.1 (89.8)	31.9 (89.4)	31.9 (89.4)	31.7 (89.1)	31.1 (88.0)	32.8 (91.0)
Daily mean °C (°F)	26.1 (79.0)	26.3 (79.3)	26.9 (80.4)	27.7 (81.9)	27.8 (82.0)	27.5 (81.5)	27.1 (80.8)	27.3 (81.1)	27.1 (80.8)	27.1 (80.8)	26.9 (80.4)	26.5 (79.7)	27.1 (80.8)
Record low °C (°F)	21.7 (71.1)	21.8 (71.2)	22.0 (71.6)	22.6 (72.7)	23.1 (73.6)	22.8 (73.0)	22.4 (72.3)	22.5 (72.5)	22.4 (72.3)	22.4 (72.3)	22.2 (72.0)	22.0 (71.6)	21.7 (71.1)
Average rainfall mm (inches)	106.1 (4.18)	90.5 (3.56)	88.2 (3.47)	80.2 (3.16)	145.1 (5.71)	217.7 (8.57)	247.9 (9.76)	342.0 (13.46)	578.1 (22.76)	780.0 (30.71)	299.3 (11.78)	208.1 (8.19)	3,183.2 (125.32)
Average rainy days (≥ 0.1 mm)	23.2	19.5	22.0	22.8	29.6	28.9	29.0	29.8	28.1	28.8	26.1	24.1	311.9
Mean monthly sunshine hours	390.6	370.1	545.6	573.0	378.2	225.0	229.4	254.2	246.0	294.5	360.0	421.6	4,288.2
Source 1: Average Climate of Iligan City
Source 2: Climate of Iligan City

Iligan has a tropical rainforest climate (Köppen Af), falling within the third type of climate wherein the seasons are not very pronounced. Rain is more or less evenly distributed throughout the year. Because of its tropical location, the city does not experience cold weather. Neither does it experience strong weather disturbances due to its geographical location. Iligan lies outside the typhoon belt and is also surrounded by mountains that deflect or weaken storms.

=== Barangays ===
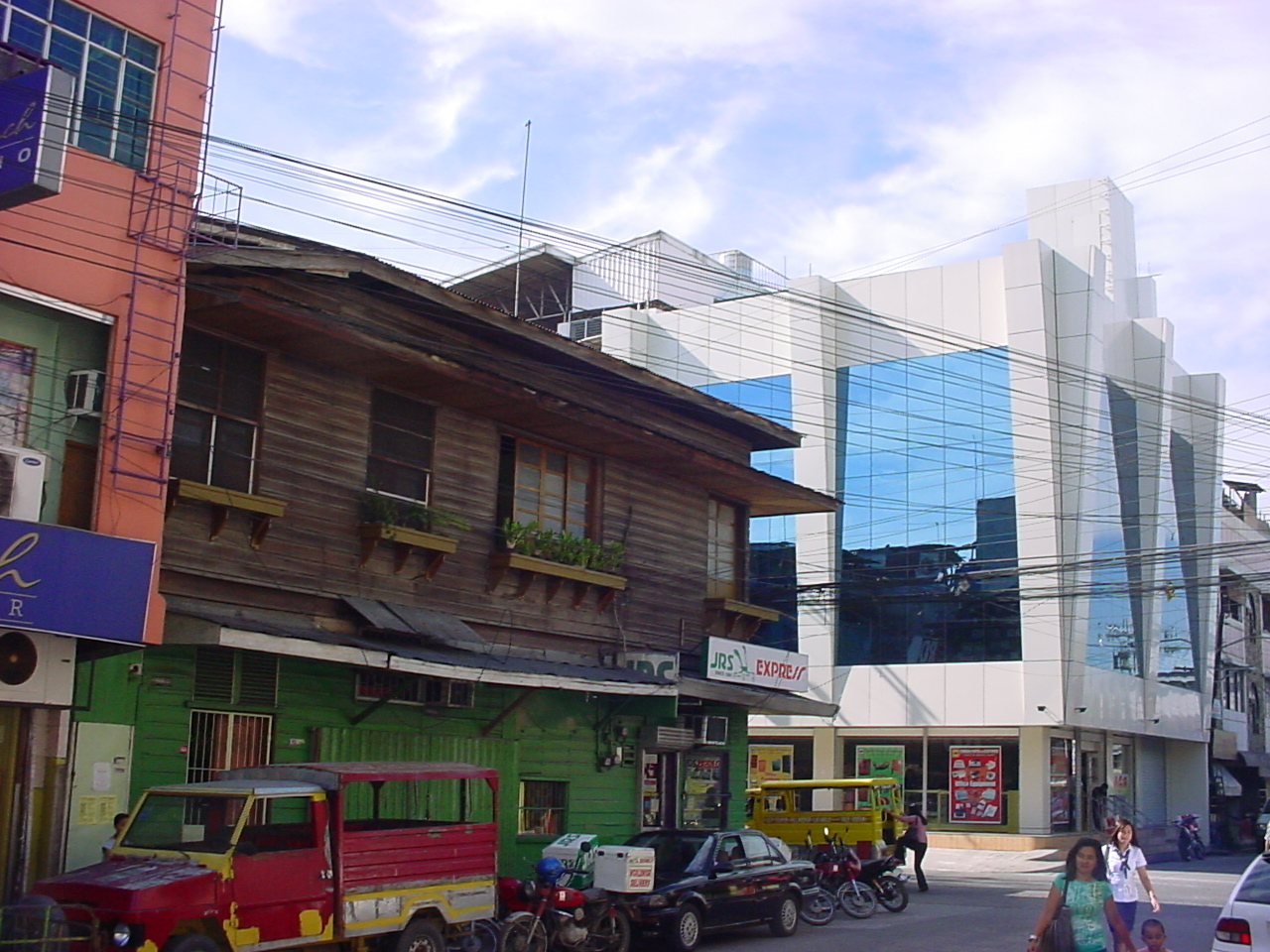
Lluch Street

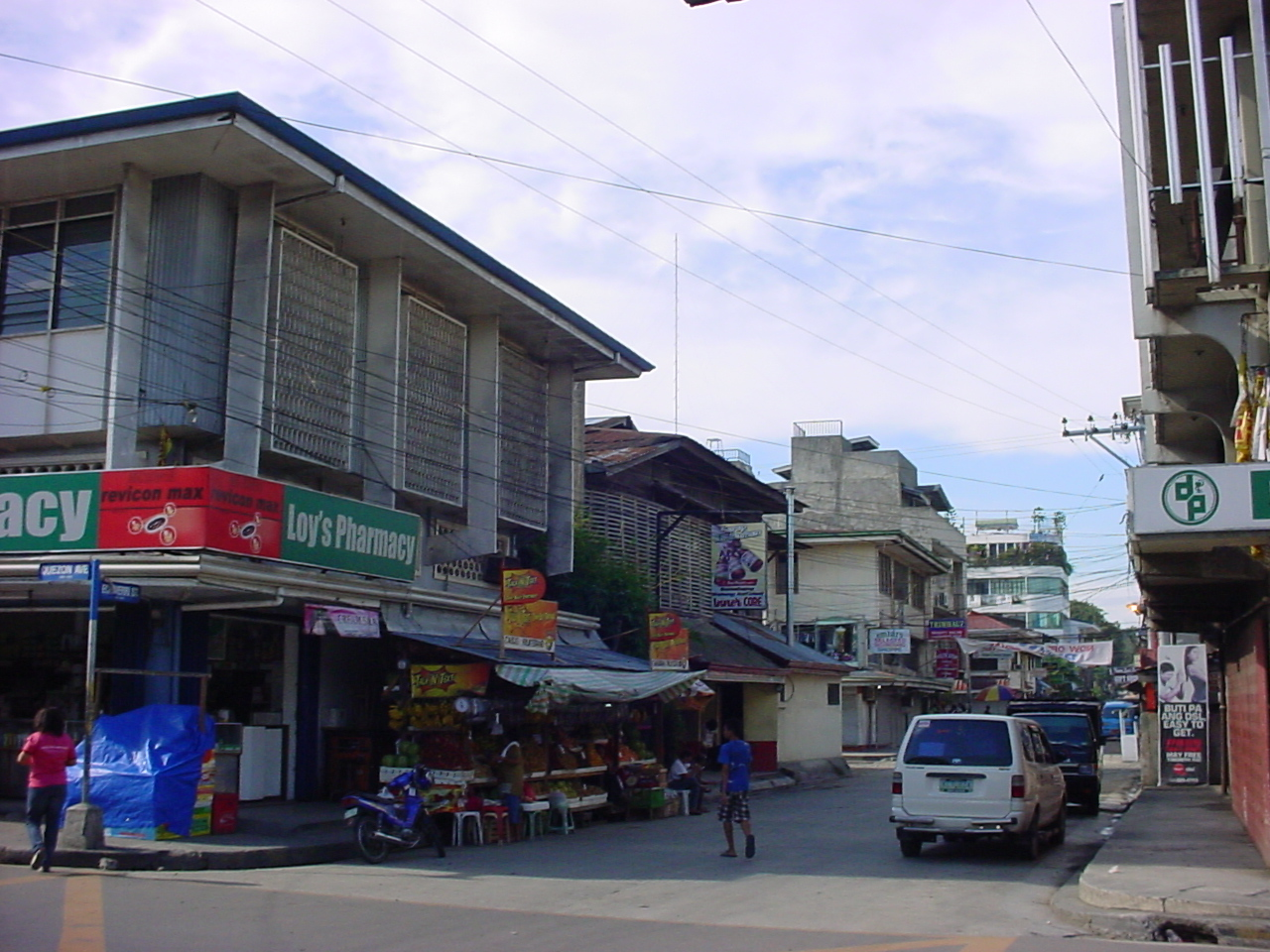
Echiverri Street

Iligan is politically subdivided into 44 barangays. Depending on the barangay, it is subdivided to puroks or zones.

- Abuno
- Acmac-Mariano Badelles Sr.
- Bagong Silang
- Bonbonon
- Bunawan
- Buru-un
- Dalipuga
- Del Carmen
- Digkilaan
- Ditucalan
- Dulag
- Hinaplanon
- Hindang
- Kabacsanan
- Kalilangan
- Kiwalan
- Lanipao
- Luinab
- Mahayahay
- Mainit
- Mandulog
- Maria Cristina
- Pala-o
- Panoroganan
- Poblacion
- Rogongon
- San Miguel
- San Roque
- Santa Elena
- Santa Filomena
- Santiago
- Santo Rosario
- Saray
- Suarez
- Tambacan
- Tibanga
- Tipanoy
- Tomas L. Cabili (Tominobo Proper)
- Upper Tominobo
- Tubod
- Ubaldo Laya
- Upper Hinaplanon
- Villa Verde

== Demographics ==
Population census of Iligan

Year	Pop.	±% p.a.
1903	2,872	—
1918	10,078	+8.73%
1939	28,273	+5.03%
1948	25,725	−1.04%
1960	58,433	+7.07%
1970	104,493	+5.98%

Year	Pop.	±% p.a.
1975	118,778	+2.60%
1980	167,358	+7.10%
1990	226,568	+3.08%
1995	273,004	+3.56%
2000	285,061	+0.93%
2007	308,046	+1.08%

Year	Pop.	±% p.a.
2010	322,821	+1.72%
2015	342,618	+1.14%
2020	363,115	+1.23%
2024	368,132	+0.33%

Source: Philippine Statistics Authority

The population includes Higaonons of neighboring Bukidnon and Misamis Oriental, and many settlers and migrants from other parts of the country. It is known for its diverse culture.

=== Language ===
Cebuano is the primary language of Iligan City. Other commonly used languages include Hiligaynon, Ilocano, Chavacano, and Waray. English and Tagalog/Filipino is used as another secondary lingua franca and verbal communication channel among residents and transients, the latter of which is especially used by those from Luzon, Maguindanao del Norte, Maguindanao del Sur, and Lanao del Sur.

Muslims in the city generally come from native Moro groups such as the Maguindanaon, Maranao, and Iranun peoples. They primarily speak Maguindanaon, Maranao, and Iranun respectively, but many also use Cebuano, Hiligaynon and Tagalog in daily communication.

=== Religion ===
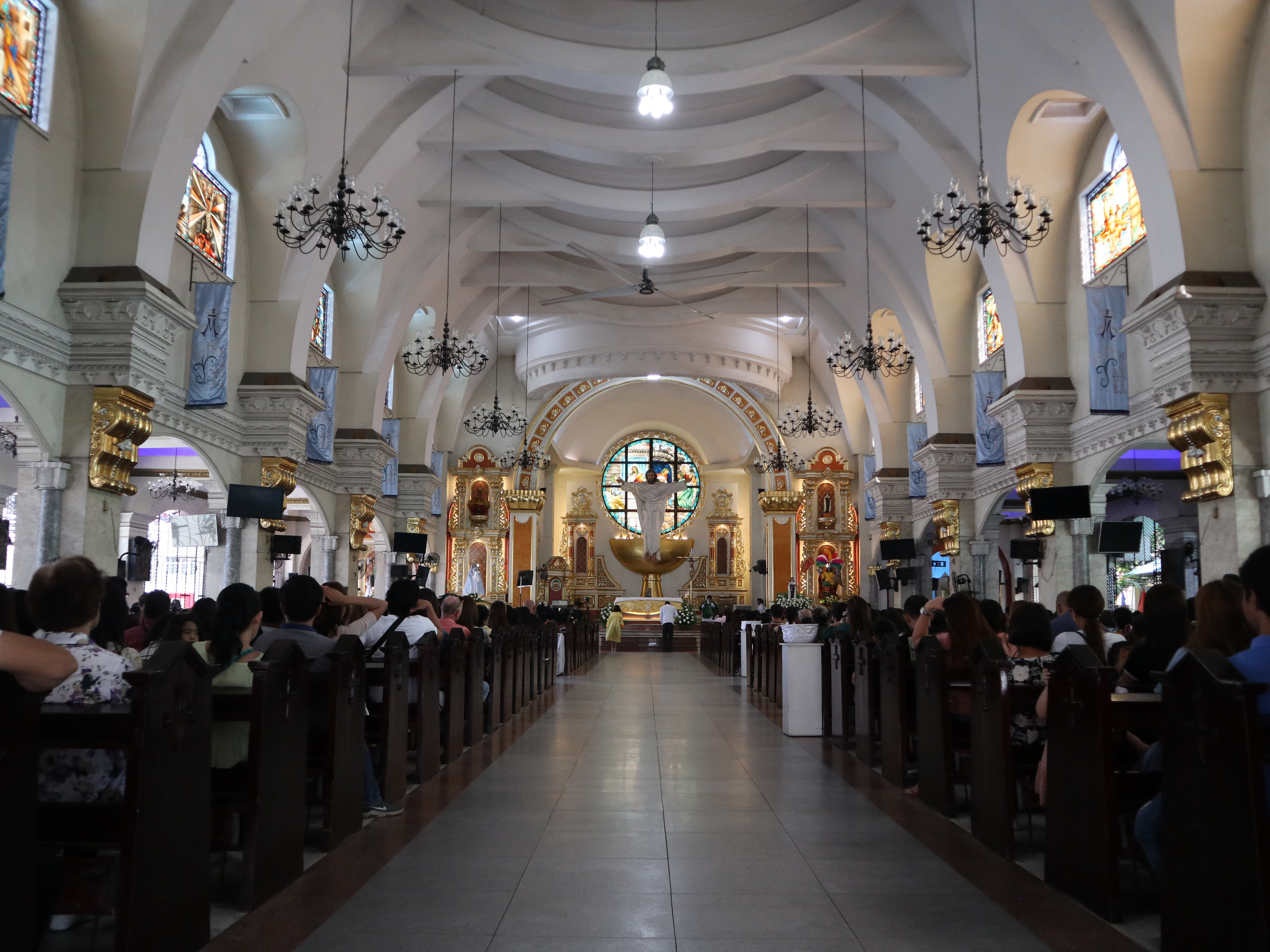
Interior of Saint Michael Cathedral in Iligan

The majority of Iligan citizens are Christians (mainly Roman Catholics). The city is also the center of the Diocese of Iligan which has 25 parishes in Iligan City and twelve municipalities of Lanao del Norte (Linamon, Kauswagan, Bacolod, Maigo, Kolambugan, Tubod, Baroy, Lala, Kapatagan, Sapad, Salvador, and Magsaysay). It covers an area of 3,092 square kilometers (1,194 sq mi) with a population of 1,551,000, which 65.5% of the population are Roman Catholics, which includes charismatics.

== Economy ==
Poverty incidence of Iligan (%)

Source: Philippine Statistics Authority

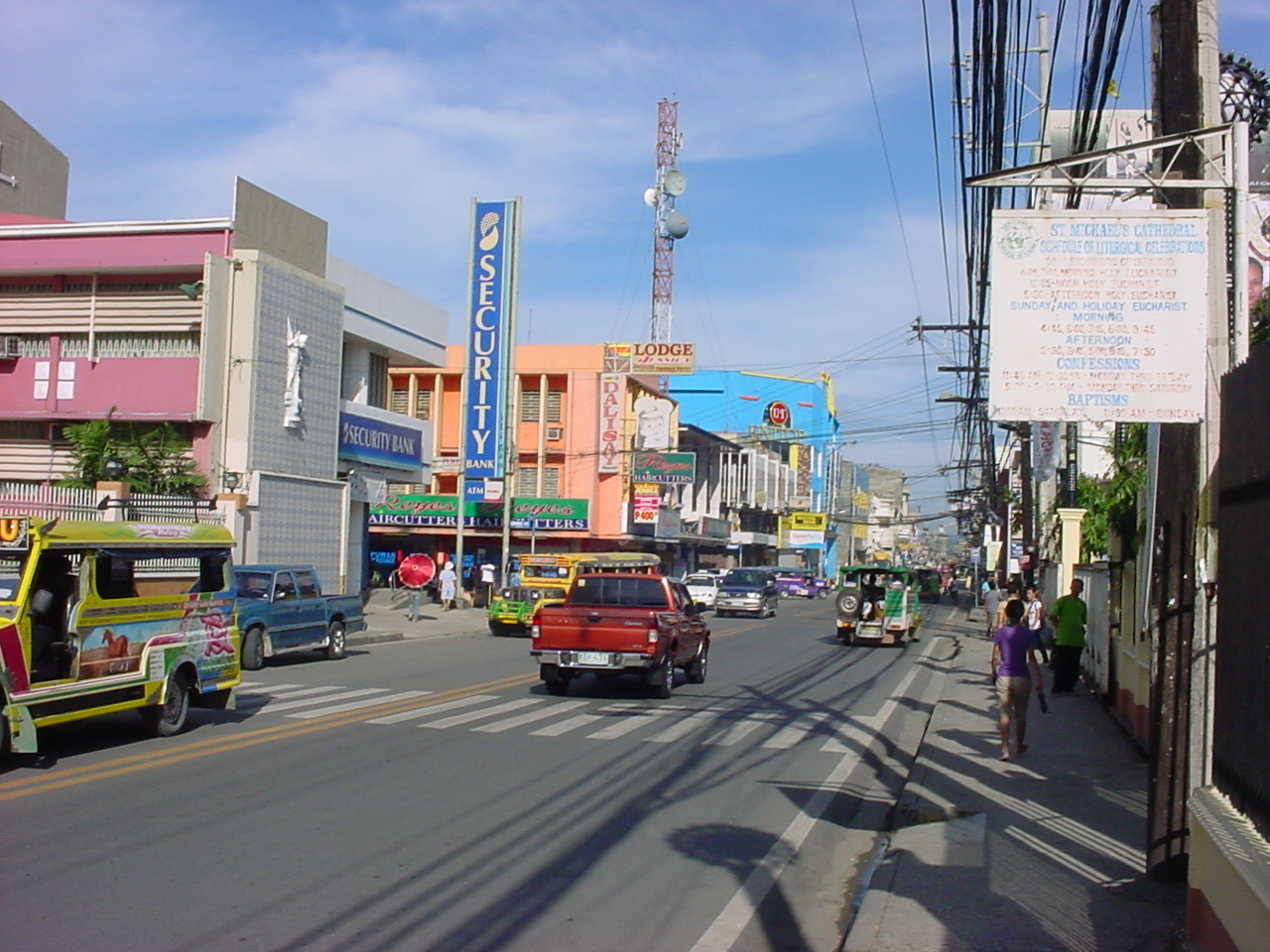
Downtown Iligan

=== Industrial ===
Iligan is known as the industrial center of the south, as its economy is largely based on heavy industries. It produces hydroelectric power for the Mindanao region through the National Power Corporation (NAPOCOR), the site of the Mindanao Regional Center (MRC) housing Agus V, VI, and VII hydroelectric plants. Moreover, Holcim Philippines' largest Mindanao cement plant is located in the city. It also houses industries like steel, tinplate, cement, and flour mills.

After the construction of Maria Cristina (Agus VI) Hydroelectric Plant by the National Power Corporation in 1950, the city experienced rapid industrialization which continued until the late 1980s. The largest steel plant in the country, National Steel Corporation (NSC), was also established in 1962.

During the 1997 Asian financial crisis, the city experienced a severe economic slowdown. A number of industrial plants were closed, notably the National Steel Corporation.

The city saw its economic revival with the reopening of the National Steel Corporation, renamed Global Steelworks Infrastructures, Inc. (GSII) in 2004. In October 2005, GSII officially took a new corporate name: Global Steel Philippines (SPV-AMC), Inc.

=== Agro-Industry ===
Aside from heavy industries, Iligan is also a major exporter and producer of various plants and crops.

Crops:

- Banana plantations: 12,780.40 hectares (31,581.1 acres)
- Coconut plantations: 11,036.95 hectares (27,272.9 acres)
- Corn plantations: 4,193.86 hectares (10,363.3 acres)
- Coffee production: 969.43 hectares (2,395.5 acres)
- Livestock: 28,992 heads
- Poultry: 17,728 heads

=== Finance ===
As of the fiscal year 2018, Iligan has a current operating income of ₱2,052.89 million. The income grew by 8% compared to the fiscal year of 2017 in which Iligan's operating income was ₱1,900 million. According to the 2017 Financial Report by the Commission on Audit, Iligan's total assets amounted to ₱10.27 billion.

== Tourism ==
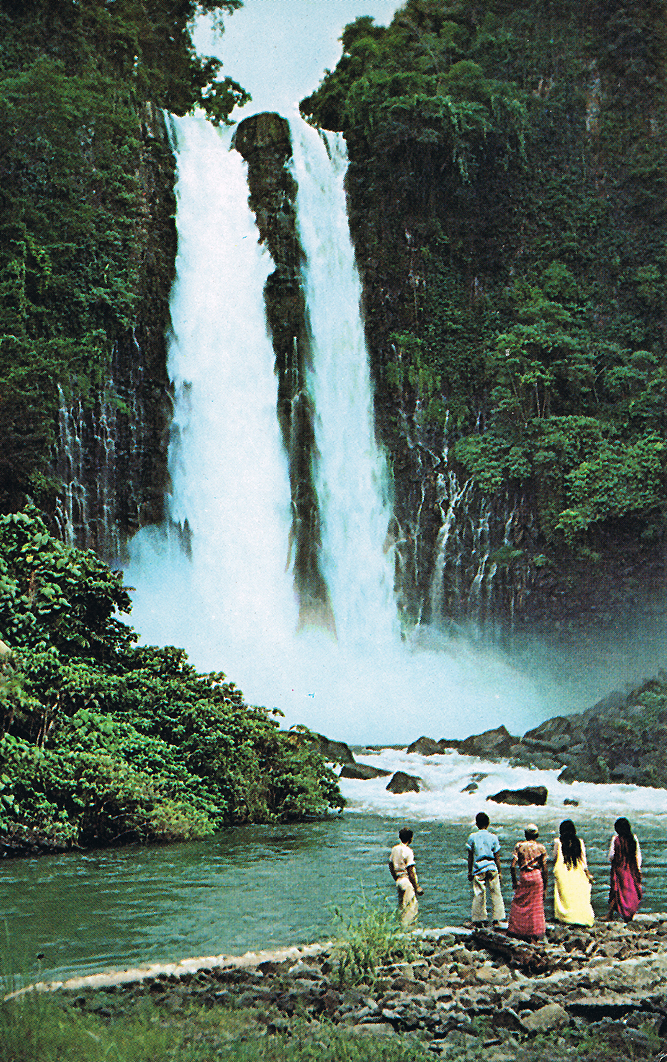
Maria Cristina Falls

Iligan is commonly known as the "City of Majestic Waterfalls" because of the numerous waterfalls located within its area. The many waterfalls in the area attract tourists from all over the world with their beauty and power. There are about 24 waterfalls in the city. The most well-known is the Maria Cristina Falls. It is also the primary source of electric power of the city, harnessed by the Agus VI Hydroelectric Plant.

Other waterfalls in the city are Tinago Falls, accessible through a 300-step staircase in Barangay Ditucalan. Mimbalut Falls in Barangay Buru-un, Abaga Falls in Barangay Suarez, and Dodiongan Falls in Barangay Bonbonon.

Limunsudan Falls in Barangay Rogongon about 50 kilometers (31 mi) from the city proper of Iligan. These are the highest waterfalls in the Philippines, at 265 m (869 ft).

Iligan is home to the famous San Miguel of Iligan. It is an image of Saint Michael the archangel that dons a Native American Headdress (Aztec and Incan practice) especially when he goes to battle against Satan. The animist Lumad, the Muslim Moro and the Christian Visayans, Chavacanos, and Latinos who live together peacefully in Iligan all celebrate this festival dedicated to San Miguel and they have Eskrima dances dedicated to him. The Eskrima martial art called San Miguel Eskrima is related to this saint.

== Government ==
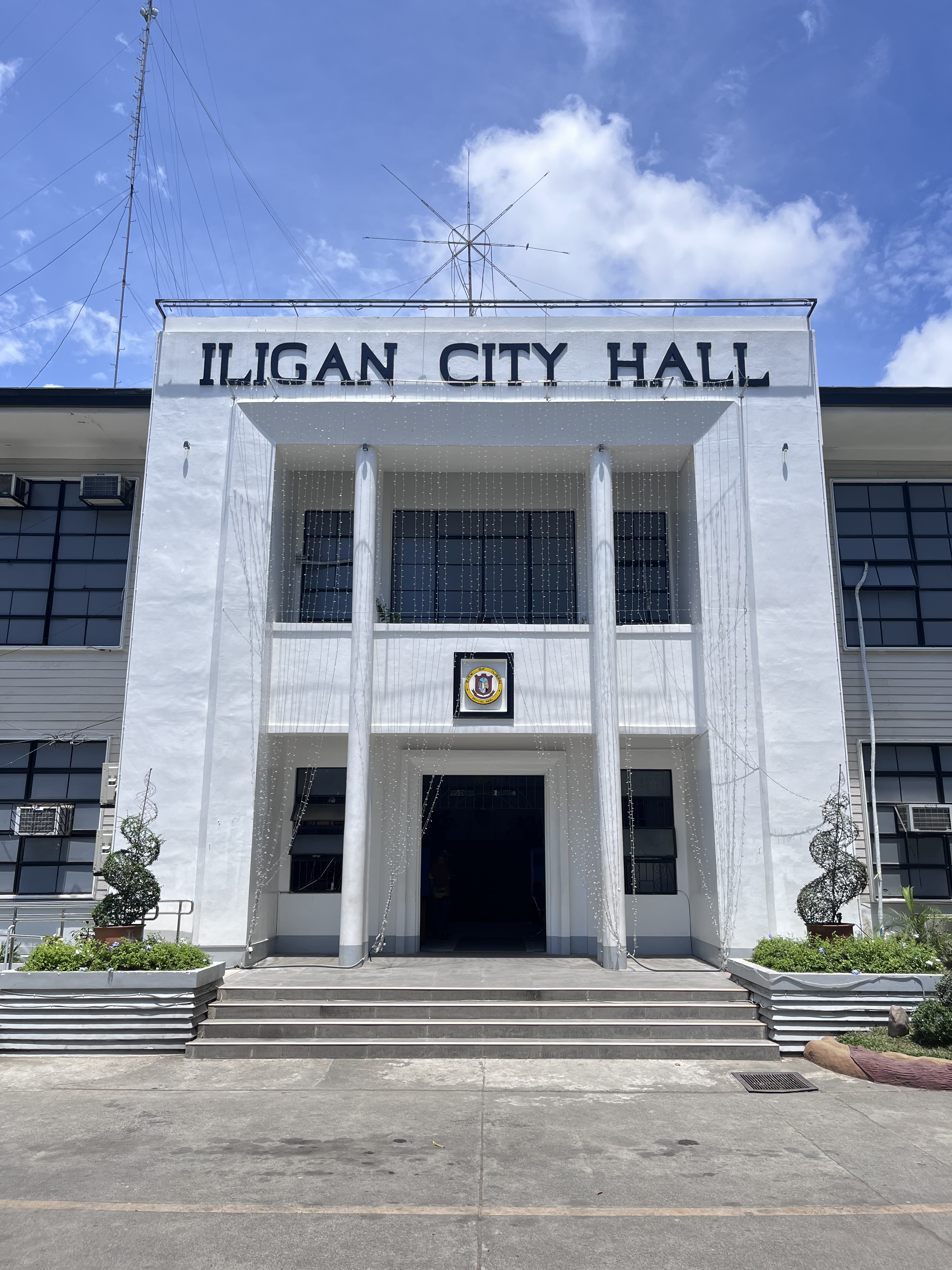
Iligan City Hall

Iligan is a highly urbanized city and is politically independent of the province of Lanao del Norte. Registered voters of the city no longer vote for provincial candidates such as the Governor and Vice Governor, unlike its nearby towns that make up the provinces as a result of its charter as a city in the 1950s.

Iligan's seat of government, the city hall, is located at Buhanginan Hills in Barangay Pala-o. The local government structure is composed of one mayor, one vice mayor, and twelve councilors. Each official is elected publicly to a 3-year term and can be re-elected up to 3 terms in succession. The day-to-day administration of the city is handled by the city administrator.

=== Municipal Mayors ===
- 1935-1940: Jorge Ramiro (1st Elected Municipal Mayor)
- 1940-1945: Leo Garcia Sr. (Elected then Japanese Appointed during WW2)
- 1945: Ramon Paradela
- 1945: Bernardo Zosa (Appointed)
- 1946: Benito S. Ong (Appointed)
- 1946: Rafael Villanea Sr. (Appointed)
- 1947: Esmeraldo Roque (Appointed)

=== City Mayors ===
- 1950–1953: Benito S. Ong (Charter Mayor)
- 1954–1955: Benito C. Labao (Appointed)
- 1956–1959: Mariano Ll. Badelles (First Elected City Mayor)
- 1960–1984: Camilo P. Cabili
- 1984–1986: Pacificador A. Lluch (by Succession)
- 1986–1987: Alan L. Flores (Appointed OIC-Mayor Designate)
- 1987–1988: Lucio C. Badelles (Appointed)
- 1988 (3 days): Esperidion L. Sagrado (Appointed)
- 1988–1992: Camilo P. Cabili
- 1992–1998: Alejo A. Yañez
- 1998–2004: Franklin M. Quijano
- 2004–2013: Lawrence Ll. Cruz
- 2013–2022: Celso G. Regencia
- 2022–present: Frederick W. Siao

=== Vice Mayors since 1986 ===
- 1998–2001: Pedro B. Generalao
- 2001–2004: Lawrence Ll. Cruz
- 2004–2013: Henry C. Dy
- 2013–2016: Ruderic C. Marzo
- 2016–2022: Jemar L. Vera Cruz
- 2022–2025: Marianito Dodong D. Alemania
- 2025–present: Wekwek Uy

== Transportation ==
=== Seaport ===
The Port of Iligan is located along the northern central coastal area of Mindanao facing Iligan Bay with geographical coordinates of approximately 8°13′56″N 124°13′54″E.

It serves the port users and passengers coming from the hinterlands of the provinces of Lanao del Norte, Lanao del Sur, parts of Misamis Oriental, and the cities of Iligan and Marawi.

Passenger and cargo shipping lines operating in the Port of Iligan serve the cities of Cebu and Ozamiz.

There are around seven private seaports in Iligan operated by their respective heavy industry companies. These private seaports can be found in Barangays Maria Cristina, Suarez, Tomas L. Cabili, Santa Filomena, and Kiwalan.

=== Airports ===
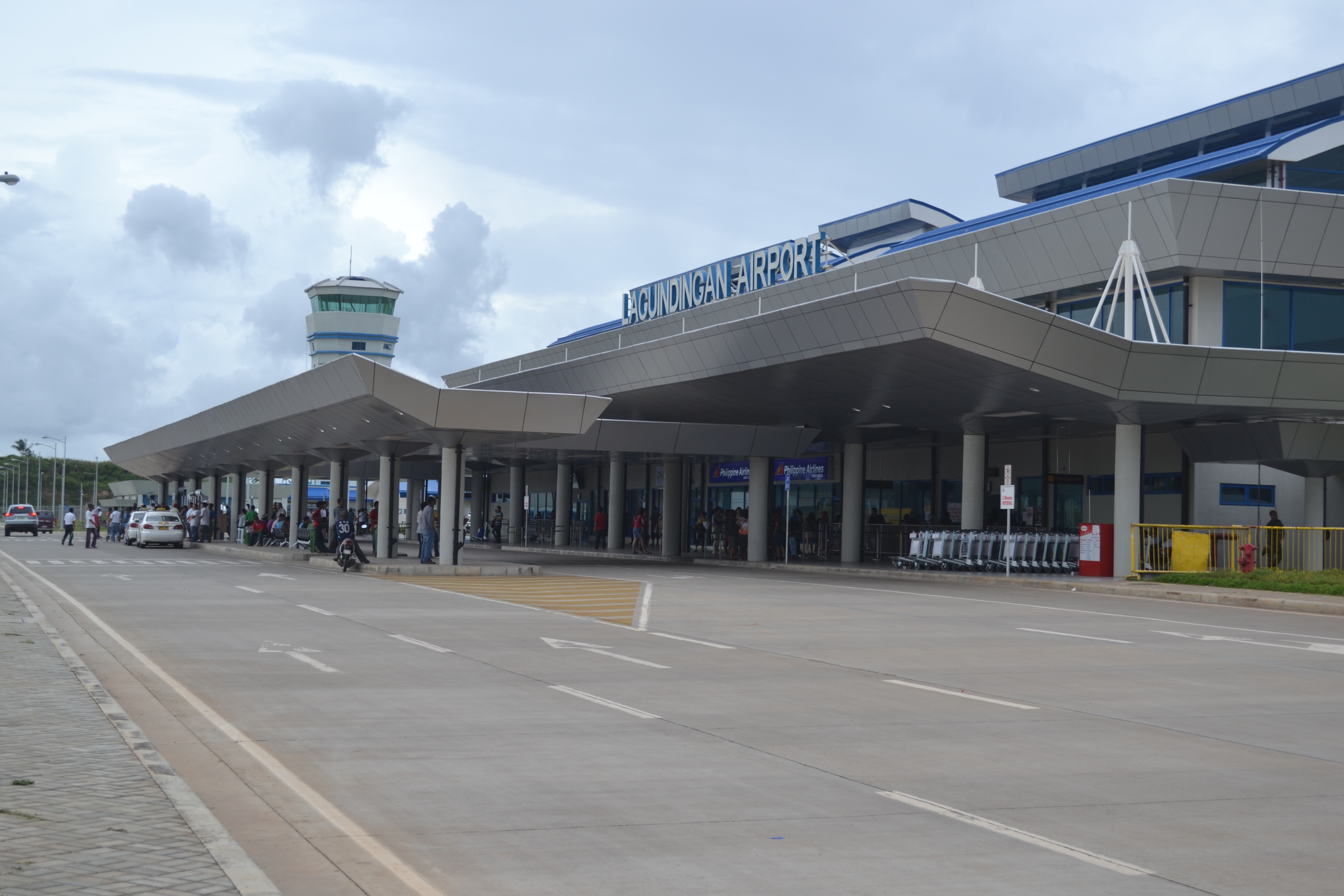
Laguindingan Airport serves the City of Iligan and the rest of Northern Mindanao

The main airport is Laguindingan Airport, located in the municipality of Laguindingan, Misamis Oriental, which opened on June 15, 2013. The airport replaced Lumbia Airport as the main airport of Misamis Oriental and Northern Mindanao. It has daily commercial flights to and from Cebu, Davao, via Philippine Airlines and Cebu Pacific.

Maria Cristina Airport is located in Balo-i and was the main airport of Iligan in the late 1980s. Aerolift Philippines, a now-defunct regional airline, ceased its services when one of their passenger planes crashed into some structures at the end of the runway of the Manila Domestic Airport in 1990. This resulted in their bankruptcy. Thus, it ended its service to Iligan's airport at Balo-i which also resulted in the closure of the airport. Philippine Airlines served the city for many years before ending flights in 1998 due to the Asian financial crisis.

=== Bus terminals ===
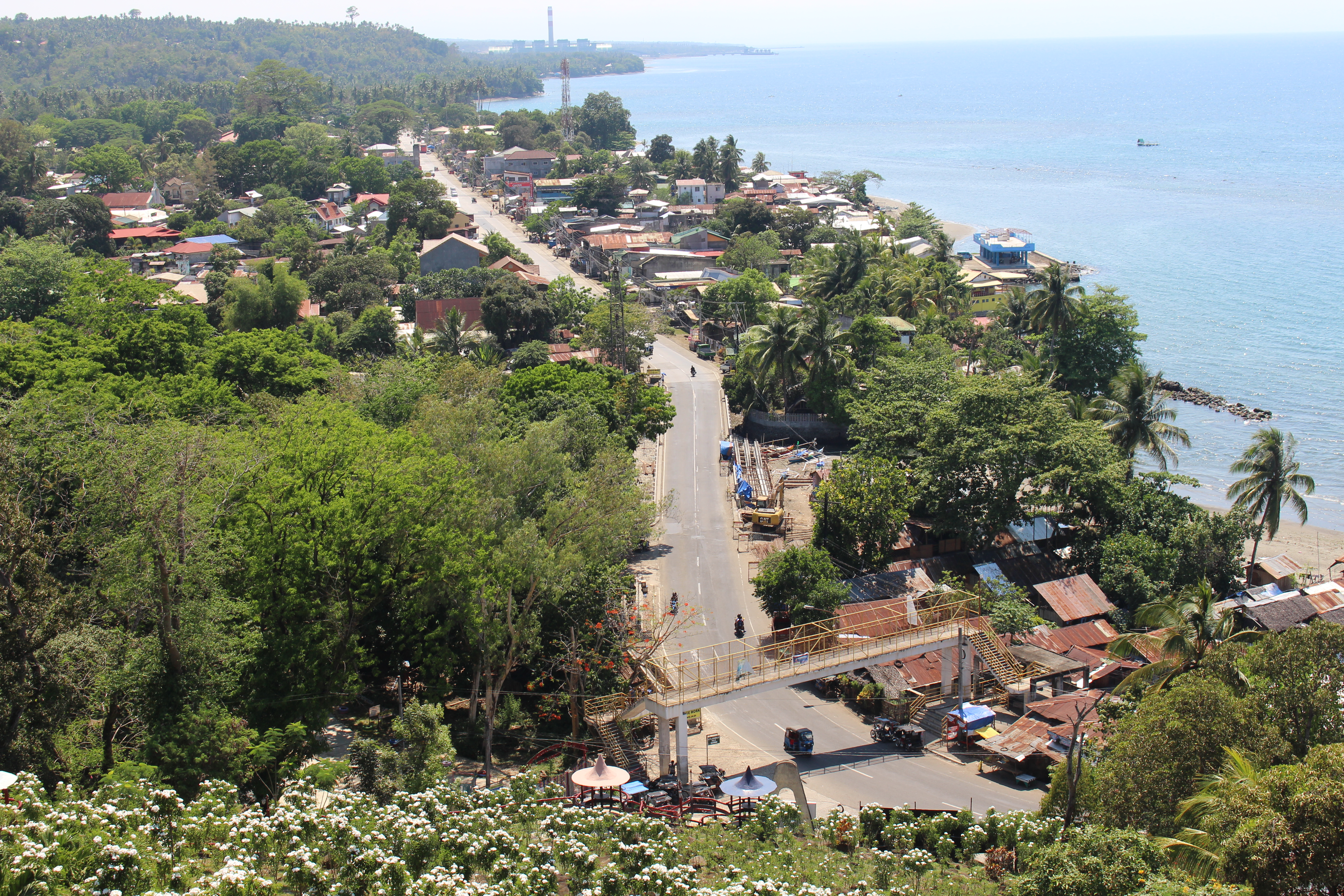
A highway portion of the Butuan–Cagayan de Oro–Iligan Road (National Route 9) at Iligan City.

There are two main bus terminals in Iligan.

- The Integrated Bus and Jeepney Terminal (IBJT) caters westbound trips to and from Cagayan de Oro Davao, Butuan City, General Santos City, Lucena, Esperanza, Lambayong, Butuan,
- The Southbound Bus and Jeepney Terminal caters eastbound trips to and from Cotabato City, Zamboanga City, Dipolog, Ozamiz, Pagadian, Cubao, Quezon City, Matanog, Buldon, Barira, Parang, and Marawi.

Both bus terminals provide daily trips from and to Iligan. Passenger vans and jeeps also service various municipalities in Lanao del Sur.

=== City transportation ===
Kuliglig Tricabs Passengers Motorized Trisikad Jeepneys are the primary mode of public transportation in Iligan City, operating on most major routes throughout the city. These are gradually being supplemented and replaced by modern minibuses under the public utility vehicle modernization program.

Kuliglig Tricabs Passengers Motorized Trisikad Pedicabs are used mainly for short-distance travel within barangays, while tartanillas operate in limited areas, particularly in parts of Barangay Pala-o and Barangay Tambacan.

== Education ==
The City of Iligan has one state university and seven private colleges specializing in Engineering and Information Technology, Health Services, Maritime Science, Business and Administration, Primary and Secondary Education, and Arts and Social Sciences.

With a total of 181 schools (106 public; 75 private; 17 madaris) including vocational and technical schools, Iligan has an average literacy rate of 94.71, one of the highest in the whole Philippines.

=== Mindanao State University – Iligan Institute of Technology ===
The Mindanao State University – Iligan Institute of Technology (MSU-IIT) is one of the few autonomous external campuses of the Mindanao State University (MSU) and "the light-bearer of the several campuses of the MSU System." It is considered one of the best universities in the Philippines with excellence in Science and Technology, Engineering, Mathematics, Information Technology, and Natural Sciences. The institution has also produced many topnotchers and rankers in multiple board exams.

=== Colleges ===
- St. Michael's College, Iligan City, is known as the oldest school in the Lanao area, founded as a catechetical center way back in 1914 by Fr. Felix Cordova, S.J. It was formally established in 1915 as Escuela de San Miguel in honor of the patron saint, St. Michael the Archangel. Now on its active bid to become the city's first private Catholic university, Saint Michael's College of Iligan currently offers 8 disciplines: Business Administration, Accountancy, Hotel, and Restaurant Management, Engineering and Computer Studies, Nursing, Criminology, Education, Arts and Sciences and the Basic Education. It also offers the TESDA Ladderized Courses and the education-related Graduate Studies Program.
- St. Peter's College, Iligan City, is an engineering, accounting, and business administration school founded in 1952.
- Capitol College of Iligan Inc., more popularly known as Iligan Capitol College (ICC), is a private, non-sectarian, coeducational institution of learning which was established in 1963 by the late Engr. Sesenio S. Rosales and Madame Laureana San Pedro Rosales. It was registered with the Securities and Exchange Commission (SEC) on February 12, 1964. In 1997, Iligan Capitol College established Lyceum Foundation of Iligan which is to become its sister college beside Corpus Christi Parish in Tubod, Iligan City.
- Iligan Medical Center College, is a private and non-sectarian Medicine and Health Services school founded in 1975.
- Adventist Medical Center College – Iligan, formerly Mindanao Sanitarium and Hospital College, is one of the colleges of the Seventh-day Adventist Church. It is a medical school that focuses on healthcare courses like Nursing, Nutrition and Dietetics, Medical Technology, Physical Therapy, Pharmacy, and Radiology.
- The Lyceum of Iligan Foundation, focuses on maritime and engineering courses. It also offers courses on Hotel and Restaurant Management, Nursing, Business Administration, and other allied Health Services.
- Other notable colleges and technical schools are Iligan Computer Institute (ICI), Santa Monica Institute of Technology (SMIT), STI College, Picardal Institute of Technology (PISTEch), Saint Lawrence Institute of Technology, Masters Technological Institute of Mindanao, and ICTI Polytechnic College Inc. (formerly Iligan City Technical Institute (ICTI)).

=== Basic education ===
- Iligan City National High School, the largest high school campus in Iligan.
- Lanao Chung Hua School, the first and only Chinese school in Iligan which was founded on November 12, 1938.
- La Salle Academy is a Lasallian school. It is the first of the third generation of La Salle schools founded by the De La Salle Brothers in the country.
- Corpus Christi Parochial School of Iligan is a catholic private school that was founded in 1964, by Father Sean J. Mcgrath and its former principal Inocencia L. Tapic.
- Iligan City East National High School, formerly known as Regional Science High School for Region XII but was then transferred to Cagayan de Oro and was changed into Iligan City East National High School. The School was founded in February 1986. Specializes in research, sciences, mathematics, technology education, and others.
- Integrated Developmental School, founded as Iligan High School, was established in 1946. On July 12, 1968, the school was annexed to Mindanao State University – Iligan Institute of Technology under R.A. No. 5363.
- Del Carmen Integrated School
- Suarez National High School
- Iligan City National High School - Tambacan Annex
- Iligan City East National High School - Santiago Annex

== Notable personalities ==
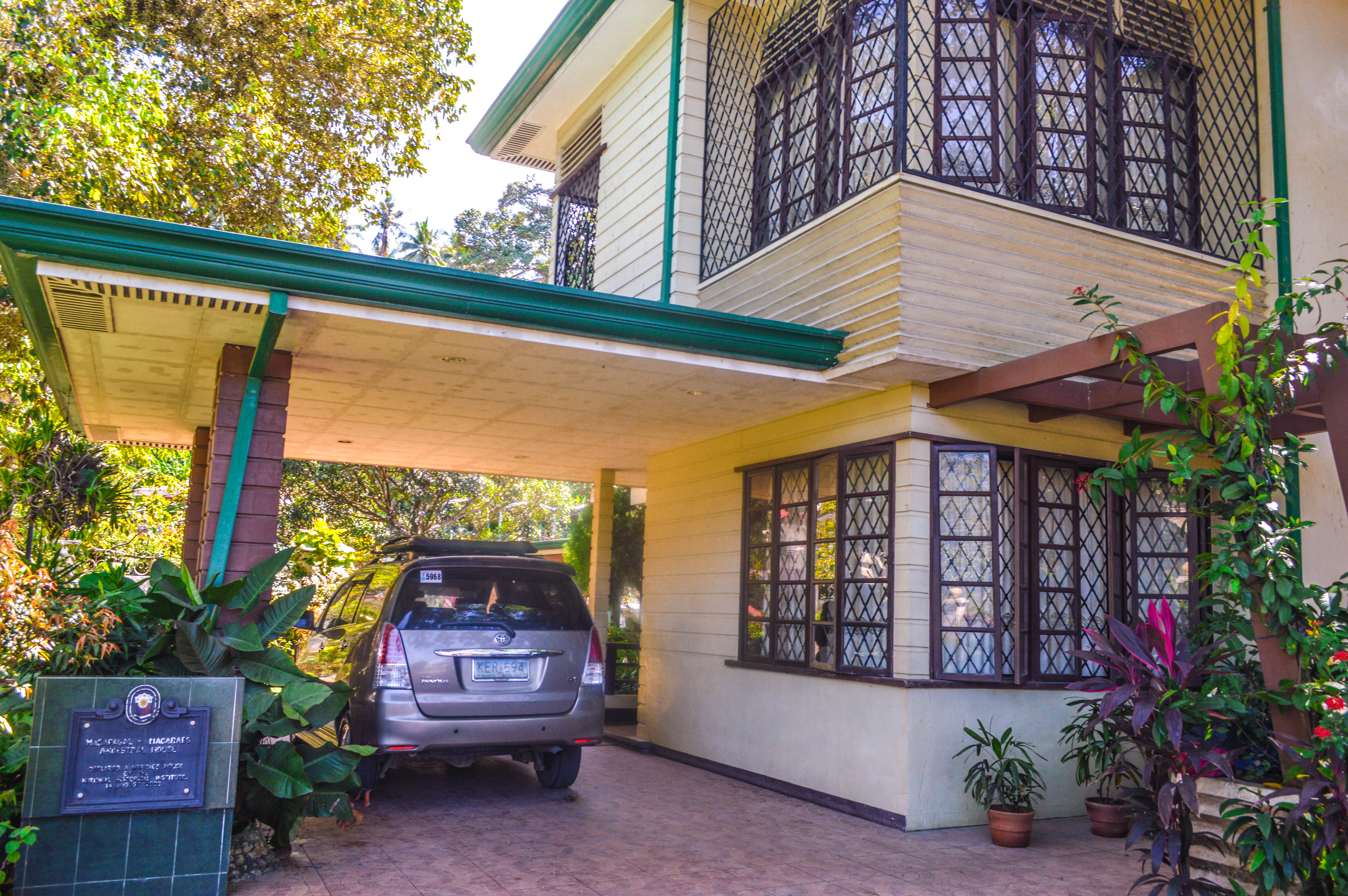
The Macapagal-Macaraeg Heritage House and Historical Marker

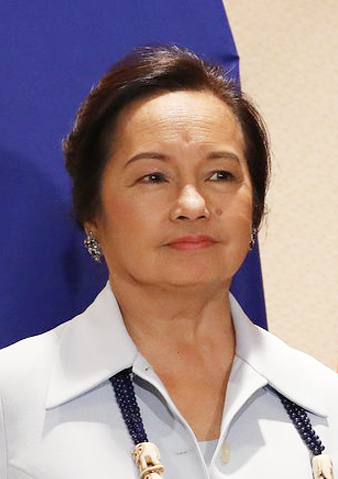
Former Philippine President Gloria Macapagal Arroyo briefly resided in Iligan, the hometown of her maternal grandparents.

- Tomas Cabili – former Senator (1946–1957), former Secretary of National Defense (1945) and World War II veteran; died in a plane crash with President Ramon Magsaysay at Mount Manunggal in Balamban, Cebu. He was the only Senator and Cabinet member from Iligan and Lanao del Norte.
- Salvador T. Lluch (1894–1969) – The first elected Congressman of the undivided Lanao province.
- Gloria Macapagal Arroyo – 14th President of the Philippines, 10th Vice President of the Philippines, 25th Speaker of the House of Representatives of the Philippines (the first woman to hold the position), deputy speaker of the 17th Congress and a member of the House of Representatives representing the 2nd District of Pampanga
- Cyrus Baguio – basketball player in the Philippine Basketball Association (2003–present)
- Riego Gamalinda – basketball player in the Philippine Basketball Association (2010–present)
- Nikki Bacolod – 1st runner-up of ABS-CBN's Search for a Star in a Million Season 1, recording artist of Viva Records, QTV 11's Posh main cast member
- Shamcey Supsup – Miss Universe Philippines 2011, 3rd runner-up Miss Universe 2011 and national director of Miss Universe Philippines
- Kath Arado – player for the UE Lady Warriors volleyball team in the UAAP and for the PLDT High Speed Hitters in the Premier Volleyball League.
- Junix Inocian – international theatre, TV, and film actor and comedian, best known as "Kuya Mario" of Batibot
- Jeson Patrombon – international tennis player
- Pia Wurtzbach – Miss Universe 2015; briefly resided in Iligan as a child with her maternal grandparents before moving to Cagayan de Oro

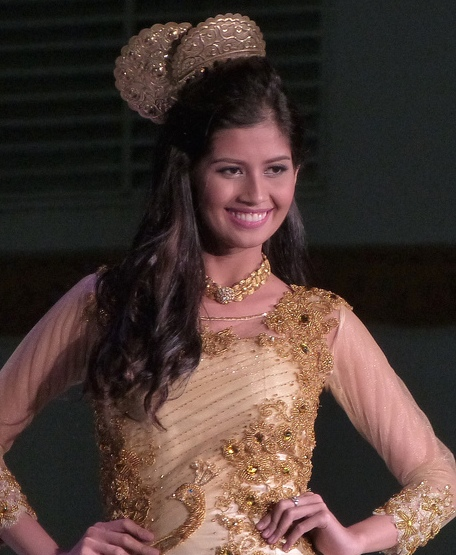
Miss Universe 2011 3rd runner-up Shamcey Supsup was born in Iligan.

- DubsteP – Filipino former professional Valorant player

== Sister cities ==
=== Local ===
- (Philippines) Lucena, Quezon
- (Philippines) Tacurong, Sultan Kudarat
- (Philippines) Buluan, Maguindanao del Sur
- (Philippines) Matanog, Maguindanao del Norte
- (Philippines) Carmen, Cotabato
- (Philippines) M'lang, Cotabato
- (Philippines) Lambayong, Sultan Kudarat
- (Philippines) Esperanza, Sultan Kudarat
- (Philippines) Buldon, Maguindanao del Norte
- (Philippines) Barira, Maguindanao del Norte
- (Philippines) Parang, Maguindanao del Norte
- (Philippines) Cagayan de Oro, Misamis Oriental
- (Philippines) General Santos, South Cotabato
- (Philippines) Makati, Metro Manila
- (Philippines) Dipolog, Zamboanga del Norte
- (Philippines) Ozamiz, Misamis Occidental
- (Philippines) Butuan, Agusan del Norte
- (Philippines) Tagbilaran, Bohol

== See also ==
- List of cities in the Philippines
- Diocese of Iligan
- Iligan Crusaders
- Iligan Steel Mill
- Mount Agad-Agad
- Timoga Spring
