= Mindanao State University–Iligan Institute of Technology =

Public university in Iligan City, Philippines

Mindanao State University Iligan Institute of Technology
- MSU-Institusyong Panteknolohiya ng Iligan (Filipino)
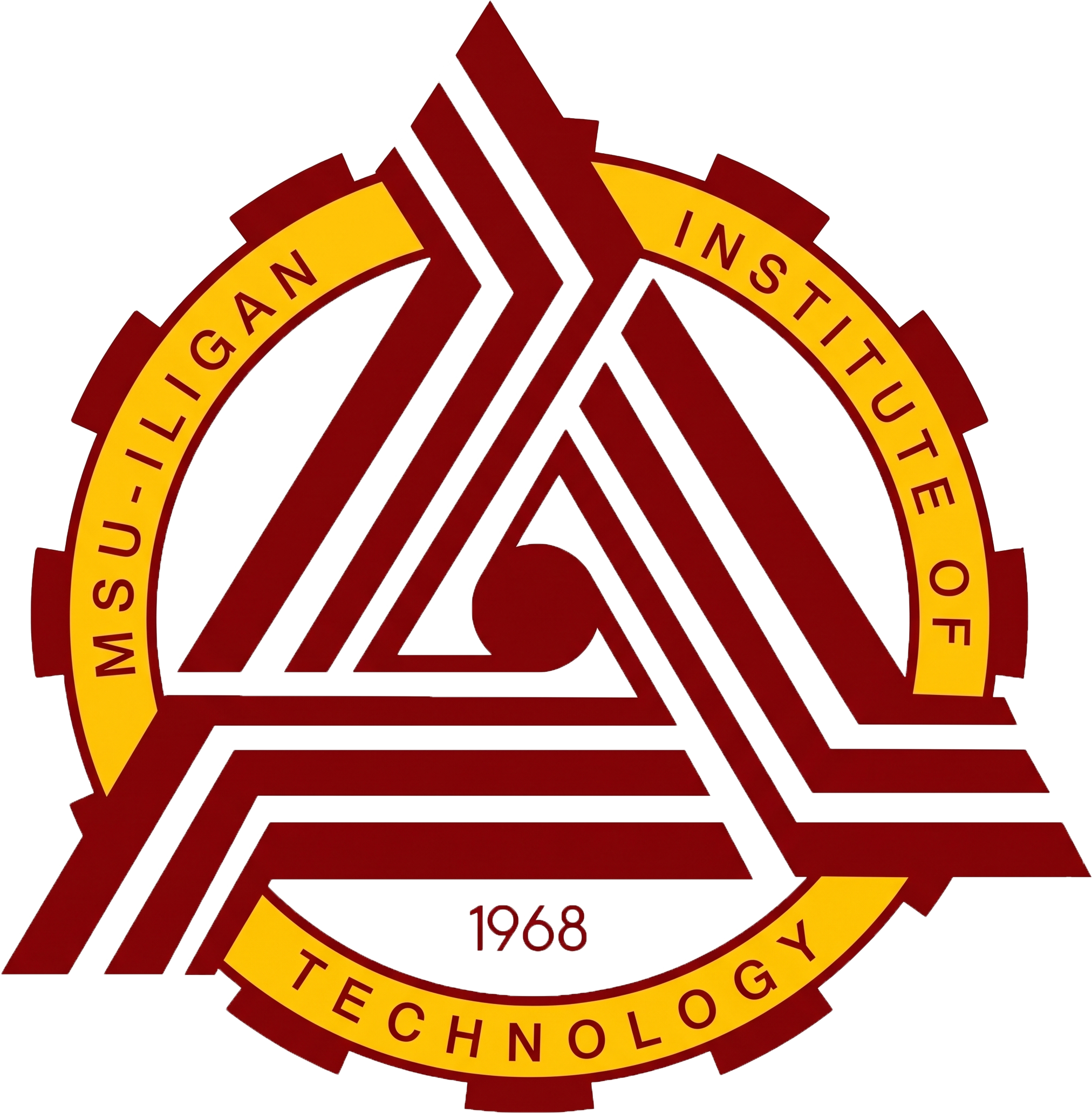
- Other name: Iligan Institute of Technology of Mindanao State University
- Former names: Iligan City High School; Lanao Technical School; Northern Mindanao Institute of Technology
- Motto: Influencing the Future
- Type: Public, State University
- Established: July 12, 1968
- Affiliations: ASAIHL, AACCUP, DOST-PCMARD, INTELLISOFT, MIRDC, SKAT, SEARCA, FIMFS, HARIBON, UN-DP, PHINMA, AUN-SEED
- Budget: ₱1.4 billion (2025)
- Chancellor: Alizedney M. Ditucalan
- President: Paisalin P. Tago
- Faculty: 512
- Students: 8,939
- Undergraduates: 8,421
- Postgraduates: 518
- Location: Andres Bonifacio Ave., Iligan City, Lanao del Norte, Philippines; 8°14′28″N 124°14′38″E
- Campus: 9 hectares
- Newspaper: Silahis
- Hymn: Himno ng Pamantasang Mindanao
- Colors: Maroon and Gold
- Nickname: IIT
- Mascot: Cat
- Website: www.msuiit.edu.ph
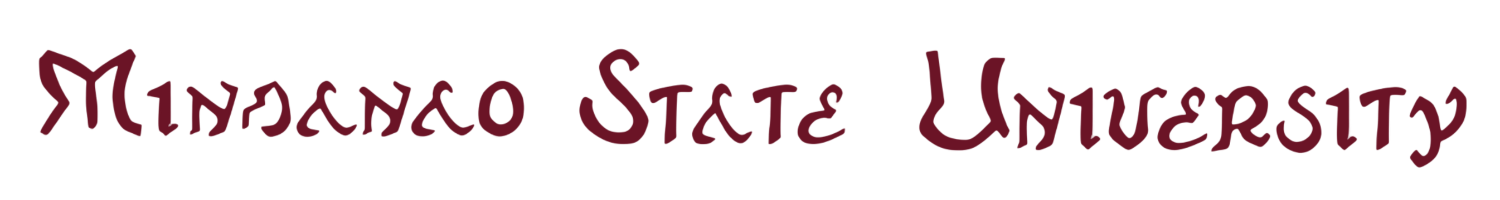

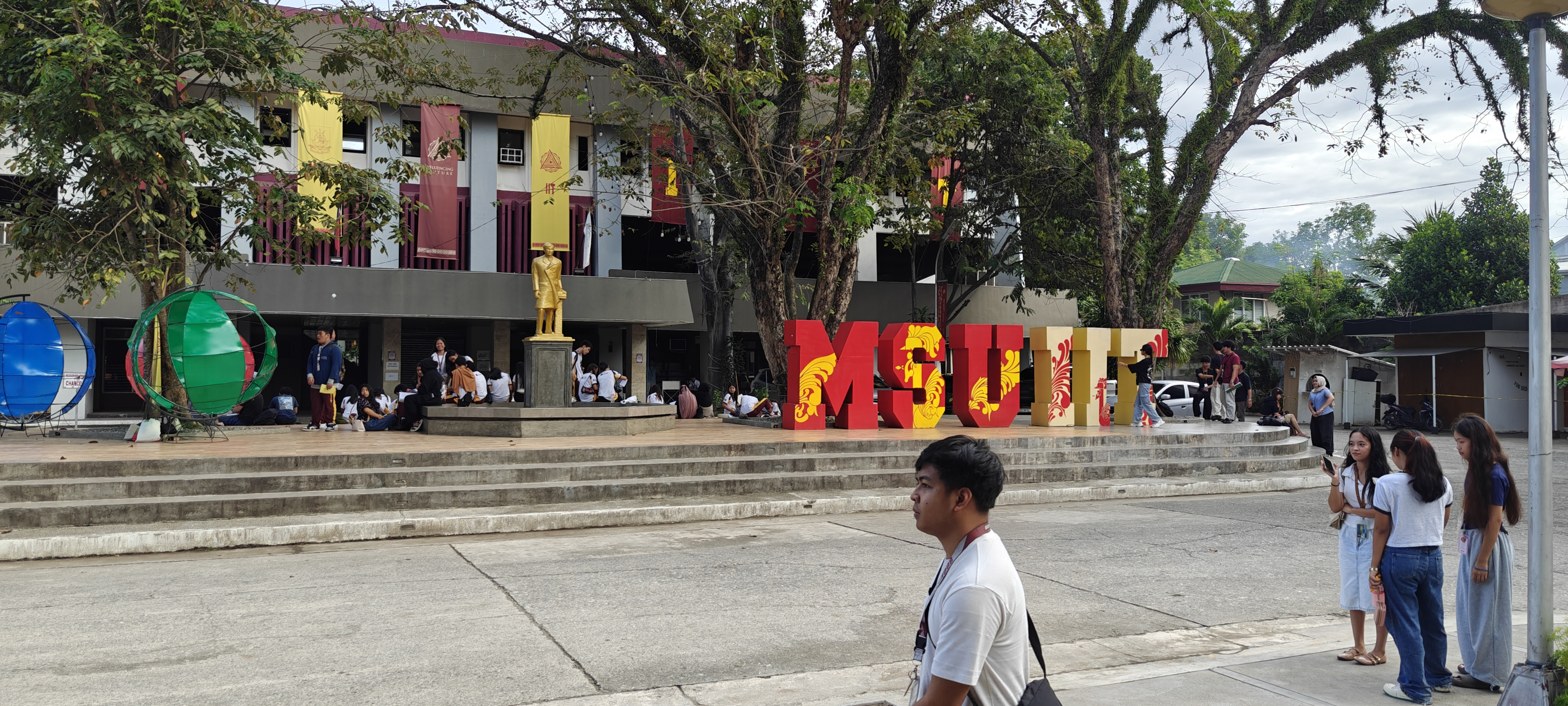
Facade of the MSU-IIT Gymnasium

The Mindanao State University–Iligan Institute of Technology (MSU-IIT) is a public university in Iligan City, Philippines, charted in 1968 by Republic Act 5363 and integrated as the first autonomous unit of the Mindanao State University system in 1975.

MSU-IIT offers programs in secondary, undergraduate, and postgraduate level education.

== History ==
Iligan Tech started in 1946 as Iligan City High School (IHS). IHS was converted into Lanao Technical School in 1956 by virtue of Republic Act 1562.

On June 19, 1965, Republic Act 4626 converted Lanao Technical School into a vocational college and renamed it as the Northern Mindanao Institute of Technology (NMIT). RA 4626 formalized NMIT as a vocational school offering elementary, secondary general, secondary vocational and normal courses of instruction and also collegiate, agricultural, and industrial courses leading to bachelor labor.

On July 12, 1968, Republic Act 5363 renamed NMIT to Iligan Institute of Technology and integrated it as a unit of the Mindanao State University. RA 5363 mandated MSU-IIT to provide a program for an effective manpower training urgently needed for the industrial and commercial development of the Mindanao State University.

On March 12, 1975, as part of a comprehensive reorganization plan, MSU-IIT was made an autonomous campus of the Mindanao State University System under BOR Resolution No. 894 series of 1975.

== Academics ==
MSU-IIT offers programs in secondary, undergraduate, and graduate levels. It confers the Bachelor of Arts, Bachelor of Science, Master of Arts, Master of Science, and Doctor of Philosophy degrees. Its academic offerings include education, engineering, engineering technology, mining, computer science, information technology, biology, chemistry, physics, statistics, mathematics, arts, humanities, linguistics, social sciences, nursing, business, accountancy, and law. The primary medium of instruction is English, with a few classes taught in Filipino and other languages.

Currently, MSU-IIT has 7 Centers of Excellence designated by the Commission on Higher Education: Mathematics, Chemistry, Biology, Physics, Mechanical Engineering, Electronics Engineering and Teacher Education. It has also 11 CHED's Centers of Development: Filipino, History, Sociology, Information Technology, Statistics, Marine Biology, Civil Engineering, Chemical Engineering, Ceramics Engineering, Electrical Engineering and Metallurgical Engineering.

=== Undergraduate ===
==== College of Arts and Social Sciences ====
The College of Arts and Social Sciences (CASS) is one of the seven colleges in the Institute and has seven degree offering departments namely: (1) Department of English, (2) Departamento ng Filipino at Ibang mga Wika, (3) Department of History, (4) Department of Political Science, (5) Department of Psychology, (6) Department of Sociology, and (7) the Department of Philosophy and Humanities.

The College has been recognized by the Commission on Higher Education as Centers of Development in Filipino, History, and Sociology. All of its programs have also been granted Level IV Accreditation by the Accrediting Agency of Chartered Colleges and Universities (AACCUP).

==== College of Economics, Business, and Accountancy ====
The College of Economics, Business, and Accountancy (CEBA) is composed of four departments namely: BS Accountancy; BSBA Entrepreneurship; BSBA Marketing Management; BS Economics BSBA Business Economics; BS Hospitality Management.

==== College of Computer Studies ====
The College of Computer Studies (CCS) is responsible for the teaching, research and extension functions of the Information and Communication Technology Center (ICTC). To this end, it offers degree and non-degree programs in the graduate and undergraduate levels. These programs are carried through on campus or distance mode by formal, non-formal or informal systems.

==== College of Education ====
Created by virtue of the MSU Reorganization Plan approved by the BOR Resolution no. 18 series of 1984, Special Order no. 885, CED merged three former schools: School of Industrial Education, School of Physical Education and the Developmental High School, the laboratory school for students having their practicum. Ever since, CED constituted five departments. The Department of Home Technology (DHTE) emerged from a formerly known Department of Student Teaching. The rest: Department of Science and Mathematics Education (DSME), Department of Industrial Education (DITE), Department of Physical Education (DPE) and Department of Professional Education (DPRE) progressively offer various fields of specialization in the BSED, BSIED and BEED programs. The Integrated Developmental School (IDS) is one department that serves as a laboratory school and it is fully under the supervision of the CED Dean.

==== College of Engineering ====
Since its establishment in 1977, the College of Engineering and its merger with the School of Engineering Technology in 2015, has grown and matured into a respectable engineering school. COE offers tertiary programs in engineering and technology, six of which were recognized by the Commission on Higher Education as Centers of Development in SY1999-2000 for three years and four of these programs are currently accredited by the Accrediting Agency of Chartered Colleges and Universities in the Philippines (AACCUP). In addition, it also offers three master's degree programs and three doctoral programs.

A tweet by the Chancellor Atty. Alizedney M. Ditucalan, along with the Board, will change the name from College of Engineering and Technology to simply College of Engineering. This statement also applies to the next, College of Nursing.

==== College of Health Sciences ====
Since its establishment in 2004, as an extension unit of the College of Health Sciences of the Mindanao State University Main Campus and now as the newest college of MSU-IIT, the College of Nursing (CON) has consistently ranked among the top three performing nursing schools in the country through the national Nurse Licensure Examination.

The same tweet by the Chancellor will also change College of Nursing's name to College of Health Sciences according to the Chancellor "as we are going to broaden the academic programs of the College".

==== College of Science and Mathematics ====
The Department of Science and Technology recognizes the college as a nodal institution, where DOST scholars nationwide can study. It is composed of 5 Departments: Department of Biological Sciences, Department of Physics, Department of Chemistry, Department of Marine Sciences, and Department of Statistics and Mathematics.

==== High School ====
The Integrated Developmental School (IDS) is the laboratory school of the MSU-IIT College of Education (CED). As such, it is also considered the basic education department of MSU-IIT. IDS has two levels: Junior High School (Grades 7-10) and Senior High School (Grades 11-12).

- Junior High School
- Senior High School
  - Accountancy and Business Management (ABM)
  - Humanities and Social Sciences (HUMSS)
  - Science, Technology, Engineering, and Mathematics (STEM)

Since 2024, the MSU-IIT Integrated Developmental School has physically branched out of the Tibanga campus, and is now transferred to the newly constructed Hinaplanon campus.

=== Center of Excellence and Development ===
In 2010, MSU-IIT was designated by the Commission on Higher Education (CHED) as Centers of Excellence in Biology, Chemistry, Mathematics and Teacher Education. CHED also recognizes MSU-IIT as Centers of Development in History, Information Technology, Physics, and Civil Engineering.

== Research ==
University rankings

Regional – Overall
- QS Asia: 551-600 (2021)

MSU-IIT houses several research centers and has many links with government agencies and research networks, under the Office of the Vice Chancellor for Research and Enterprise (OVCRE).

- Knowledge and Technology Transfer Office - Innovation and Technology Support Office (KTTO-ITSO)
- Institute for Peace and Development in Mindanao
- Center for Local Government Studies
- FabLab Mindanao
- Center for Innovation and Entrepreneurship (IDEYA)
- Premier Research Institute of Science and Mathematics (PRISM)
  - Mindanao Radiation Physics Center
  - Center for Nanoscience Research
  - Center for Biodiversity Studies and Conservation
  - Center for Integrative Health
  - Center for Microbial Genomics and Proteomics Innovation
  - Center for Natural Products and Drug Discovery
  - Complex Systems Research Center
  - Center for Mathematical and Theoretical Physical Sciences
  - Center for Computational Analytics and Modeling
  - Center for Energy Efficient Materials
- Research Institute for Engineering and Innovative Technology (RIEIT)
  - Center for Sustainable Polymers (DOST-NICER)
  - Center for Energy Research and Technology (CERT)
  - Sustainable Resource Engineering Research Center for Construction Material Technologies (SuRER)
  - BioProcess and BioResources Engineering Research Center (BioPRER; In consortium with SuRER)
  - Center for Integrated Circuits Design
  - Center for Mechatronics and Robotics
  - Center for Artificial Intelligence Research
  - Center for Structural Engineering and Informatics
  - Center for Remote Sensing and Geographic Information Systems
  - Bamboo Technology Resource Center (BTRC)
  - Resource Processing Technology Center
  - Research Center for Advanced Ceramics
- Research Institute for Business, Education, Health, and Social Sciences
  - Research Center for Healthy Aging
  - Mindanao Heritage and Indigenous Research Center
  - Center for Pedagogical Research
  - Center for Language Studies
  - Center for Business Innovation and Economic Development
  - Center for Hospitality and Tourism Innovation

== Student life ==
Campus-based student organizations are organized and operated in accordance with the guidelines set by the Department of Student Affairs. The main student organization is the Kataastaasang Sanggunian ng mga Mag-aaral or KASAMA (Supreme Student Council).

Students of MSU-IIT call themselves as IITian or Cats.

=== The MSU-IIT Debate Varsity (MIDV) ===
The MSU-IIT Debate Varsity is the official debating organization of MSU-IIT. Starting out as the MSU-IIT Noble Debate Society (MINDS), it was officially recognized and renamed as a varsity in 2008. It represents MSU-IIT in various debating tournaments all over the country including the Mindanao Parliamentary Debate Championship, Visayas-Mindanao Debate Championship, National Debate Championship and Philippine Intercollegiate Debating Championship, as well as in various International debate tournaments.

=== The Octava Choral Society (8va) ===
MSU-IIT is the base of 8va, a regional choral ensemble with a repertoire that includes folk, Filipino ballads, classical ethnic, and contemporary music.

=== Integrated Performing Arts Guild (IPAG) ===
IPAG is a resident theater company of MSU-IIT. It is an integrated dance and theater company in the Philippines that integrates the dance, music, and arts traditions of Mindanao. Its signature dance theater format is based on the Pangalay, an indigenous dance form in the Sulu Archipelago.

=== Kalimulan Cultural Dance Troupe (Kalimulan) ===
Kalimulan is a resident dance troupe of MSU-IIT that specializes in indigenous and folk dances from Mindanao. The troupe's name Kalimulan is coined from Kalilang and Kaamulan to denote the communication and integration of the local Islamic and non-Islamic cultures.

==== Silahis and College Publications ====
Silahis is the main publication of MSU-IIT. The name Silahis means "the rays of the sun breaking through the clouds or a sunbeam" and as such serves as the source of illumination for students regarding relevant and significant concerns in the Institute.

The institute colleges also house their own publications namely:

- Ad-Infinitum - College of Science and Mathematics
- Thu'um - College of Engineering
- CASSayuran - College of Arts and Social Sciences
- The Caduceus - College of Health Sciences
- Sidlak - College of Education
- Sindaw - College of Economics, Business, and Accountancy
- The Motherboard - College of Computer Sciences
