= List of Upsilon Phi Sigma chapters =

Upsilon Phi Sigma is an inter-university and collegiate fraternity and sorority that was established at the University of the Philippines Los Baños on February 14, 1935. Following is a list of the Upsilon Phi Sigma collegiate chapters, with active chapters in bold and inactive chapters and institutions in italics.

Number	Chapter	Charter date and range	Institution	Location (Philippines)	Status	Ref.
1	**Upsilon Alpha**	February 14, 1935	University of the Philippines Los Baños	Los Baños, Laguna	Active	
2	**Upsilon Beta**		University of the Philippines Diliman	Diliman, Quezon City	Active	
3	Upsilon Gamma	1960s	Manuel L. Quezon University	Diliman, Quezon City	Inactive	
4	**Upsilon Delta**		Philippine School of Business Administration	Quezon City	Active	
5	**Upsilon Epsilon**		University of Manila	Sampaloc District, Manila	Active	
6	**Upsilon Zeta**		De La Salle Araneta University	Malabon	Active	(Note: Chapter formed at the Araneta University Foundation (AUF), now called De La Salle Araneta University.)
7	**Upsilon Eta**		Technological Institute of the Philippines	Metro Manila	Active	
8	**Upsilon Delta Beta**		Philippine Maritime Institute	Manila	Active	
9	**Upsilon Delta Gamma**		Philippine Merchant Marine School	Metro Manila	Active	
10	**Upsilon Delta Kappa**		National University	Manila	Active	
11	**Upsilon Theta**		National College of Business and Arts	Quezon City	Active	
12	**Upsilon Iota**		Far Eastern University	Manila	Active	
13	**Upsilon Kappa**		University of the East	Manila	Active	
14	**Upsilon Lambda**		Arellano University	Metro Manila	Active	
15	**Upsilon Mu**		Fort Andres Bonifacio College		Active	(Note: Fort Andres Bonifacio College was ceded to Makati College on January 10, 1990.)
16	**Upsilon Nu**		Guzman College of Science and Technology	Manila	Active	(Note: Chapter formed at the Guzman Institute of Technology, now the Guzman College of Science and Technology.)
17	**Upsilon Omicron**		Adamson University	Manila	Active	
18	**Upsilon Pi**		Mapúa University	Metro Manila	Active	(Note: Chapter formed at the Mapua Institute of Technology, which became the Mapúa University in 2017.)
19	Upsilon Rho		Ortañez College	Quezon City	Inactive	(Note: The college closed.)
20	**Upsilon Theta Beta**		Central Colleges of the Philippines	Quezon City	Active	
21	**Upsilon Rho Mu**		Pamantasan ng Lungsod ng Muntinlupa	Muntinlupa	Inactive	
22	Upsilon Sigma		Ortañez University	Quezon City	Inactive	(Note: The university closed.)
23	**Upsilon Tau**		University of Santo Tomas	Metro Manila	Active	
24	**Upsilon Theta Chi**		Philippine College of Criminology	Manila	Active	
25	**Upsilon Upsilon**		FEATI University	Manila	Active	
26	**Upsilon Phi**		Philippine College of Arts and Technology	Quiapo, Manila	Active	
27	Upsilon Xi		Fatima Colleges, Quezon City	Quezon City	Inactive	
28	**Upsilon Lambda Alpha**		Divine Word College of Legazpi	Legazpi, Albay	Active	
29	**Upsilon Theta Delta**		University of Santo Tomas–Legazpi	Legazpi, Albay	Active	(Note: Chapter was formed at Aquianas University, which became the University of Santo Tomas–Legazpi in 2017.)
30	**Upsilon Theta Epsilon**		Sorsogon State University	Sorsogon	Active	
31	**Upsilon Theta Gamma**		Masbate College	Masbate	Active	
32	**Upsilon Theta Lambda**		University of Pangasinan	Pangasinan	Active	
33	**Upsilon Theta Mu**		Eastern Quezon College	Gumaca, Quezon	Active	
34	Upsilon Theta Nu		Doctor Yanga's Colleges	Bocaue, Bulacan	Inactive	
35	Upsilon Theta Omicron		St. Louie University, Tuguegarao	Cagayan Valley	Inactive	
36	Upsilon Theta Phi		St. Louie University, Baguio City	Baguio	Inactive	
37	Phi Eta Alpha		John B. Lacson Foundation Maritime University	Iloilo City	Inactive	
38	Phi Eta Beta		Western Institute of Technology	Iloilo City	Inactive	
39	Phi Eta Gamma		Central Philippine University	Iloilo City	Inactive	
40	Phi Eta Delta		University of San Agustin	Iloilo City	Inactive	
41	Phi Eta Eta		West Visayas State University	Iloilo City	Inactive	
42	Phi Eta Epsilon		University of Iloilo	Iloilo City	Inactive	
43	Phi Eta Zeta		St. Therese College of Iloilo	Iloilo City	Inactive	
44	Phi Eta Theta		Iloilo Doctors' College	Iloilo City	Inactive	
45	Phi Nu		University of San Carlos	Cebu City	Inactive	
46	**Phi Alpha**		Velez College of Medicine	Cebu City	Active	
47	Phi Beta Alpha		University of Cebu	Cebu City	Inactive	
48	**Phi Beta Beta**		South Western University	Cebu City	Active	
49	Phi Delta		Cebu Institute of Technology – University	Cebu City	Inactive	
50	Phi Epsilon		University of the Visayas	Cebu City	Inactive	
51	Phi Zeta		University of San Jose–Recoletos	Cebu City	Inactive	
52	**Phi Theta**		VMA Global College	Bacolod, Negros Occidental	Active	(Note: The chapter was formed at the Visayan Maritime Academy, now called VMA Global College.)
53	**Phi Pi**		Cebu Aeronautical Technical School	Cebu City	Active	
54	Phi Mu Delta		John B. Lacson Colleges Foundation – Bacolod	Bacolod	Inactive	
55	Phi Mu Gamma		Central Institute of Technology	La Carlota, Negros Occidental	Inactive	
56	Phi Iota		STI West Negros University	Bacolod	Inactive	
57	Phi Kappa		University of Negros Occidental – Recoletos	Bacolod	Inactive	
58	Phi Omega		Kabangkalan Colleges	Kabankalan	Inactive	
59	**Phi Lambda**		Colegio San Agustin Bacolod	Bacolod	Active	
60	Phi Mu Alpha		Silliman University	Dumaguete	Inactive	
61	Phi Mu Beta		Negros Oriental State University	Dumaguete	Inactive	
62	Phi Sigma Alpha		University of Bohol	Bohol	Inactive	
63	**Phi Sigma Beta**		Holy Name University	Bohol	Active	
64	Phi Sigma Chi		PMI Colleges Bohol	Bohol	Inactive	(Note: Chapter was established at the Philippine Maritime Institute, now called PMI Colleges.)
65	Phi Sigma Delta		BIT International College	Bohol	Inactive	
66	Phi Xi Alpha		Eastern Visayas State University	Tacloban	Inactive	(Note: Chapter formed at Leyte Institute of Technology, now called Eastern Visayas State University.)
67	**Phi Xi Beta**		Divine Word University of Tacloban	Tacloban	Active	
68	**Phi Xi Chi**		Leyte Colleges	Tacloban	Active	
69	**Phi Xi Delta**		Leyte Normal University	Tacloban	Active	(Note: Chapter formed at Leyte State College, which became Leyte Normal University in 1995.)
70	Phi Omicron		University of the Philippines Tacloban	Tacloban	Inactive	
71	Phi Omicron Beta		Visayas State University	Baybay, Leyte	Inactive	(Note: Chapter formed at Visayas State College of Agriculture, now Visayas State University.)
72	Phi Rho		Saint Joseph College of Maasin	Maasin City, Southern Leyte	Inactive	
73	Phi Rho Sigma		Southern Leyte State University, Tomas Oppus Campus	Tomas Oppus, Southern Leyte	Inactive	(Note: The chapter was formed from Tomas Oppus State College, now Southern Leyte State University, Tomas Oppus Campus.)
74	Phi Rho Delta		Macrohon Institute	Macrohon, Southern Leyte	Inactive	
75	Phi Rho Epsilon		San Juan Polytechnic College	Cabalian, Southern Leyte	Inactive	
76	Phi Rho Gamma		Southern Leyte State University	Sogod, Southern Leyte	Inactive	
77	Phi Tau Alpha		Capiz State University, Roxas	Roxas City, Capiz	Inactive	
78	Phi Tau Beta		Capiz State University, Dayao	Capiz	Inactive	
79	Phi Tau Delta		Capiz State University, Sigma	Capiz	Inactive	
80	Phi Sigma Epsilon		Capiz State University, Dumarao	Capiz	Inactive	
81	Phi Sigma Gamma		Capiz State University, Mambusao	Capiz	Inactive	
82	Phi Sigma Iota		Filamer Christian University	Roxas City, Capiz	Inactive	
83	Phi Gamma Alpha		St. Anthony's College, San Jose de Buenavista	Antique	Inactive	
84	Phi Gamma Beta		Antique Vocational School, Bugasong	Antique	Inactive	
85	Phi Gamma Delta		Polytechnic State College, Sibalom	Antique	Inactive	
86	Phi Gamma Delta		Polytechnic State College, Hamtic	Antique	Inactive	
87	**Phi Xi Alpha**		Aklan State University	Aklan	Active	
88	**Phi Xi Beta**		Northwestern Visayan Colleges	Aklan	Active	
89	**Phi Omicron Delta**		Eastern Samar State University	Eastern Samar	Active	
90	Phi Omicron Epsilon		University of Eastern Philippines	Catarman, Northern Samar	Inactive	
91	Sigma Alpha		Mindanao State University	Marawi	Inactive	
92	Sigma Beta		Jamiatul Philippine Al-Islamia	Marawi	Inactive	
93	Sigma Gamma		Pangarungan Islamic College	Marawi	Inactive	
94	Sigma Delta		Pacasum College	Marawi	Inactive	
95	Sigma Epsilon		Mindanao State University Lanao National College of Arts and Trades	Marawi	Inactive	
96	**Sigma Zeta**		Malabang Colleges	Malabang, Lanao del Sur	Active	
97	**Sigma Eta**		Agama Islamic Academy	Malabang, Lanao del Sur	Active	
98	Sigma Theta Alpha		Mindanao State University–Iligan Institute of Technology	Iligan	Inactive	
99	**Sigma Iota**		Iligan Capitol College	Iligan	Active	
100	**Sigma Kappa Alpha**		St. Michael's College	Iligan	Active	
101	**Sigma Lambda Alpha**		Notre Dame University	Cotabato City	Active	
102	Sigma Theta Alpha		Central Mindanao University	Musuan	Inactive	
103	Sigma Mu Alpha		Liceo de Cagayan University	Cagayan de Oro	Inactive	
104	Sigma Mu Beta		Cagayan Capitol Colleges	Cagayan de Oro	Inactive	
105	Sigma Mu Xi		Cagayan de Oro College	Cagayan de Oro	Inactive	
106	Sigma Mu Omicron		Xavier University – Ateneo de Cagayan	Cagayan de Oro	Inactive	
107	Sigma Xi Alpha		Southern Mindanao Colleges	Pagadian, Zamboanga del Sur	Inactive	
108	Sigma Xi Beta		Pagadian Capitol College	Pagadian, Zamboanga del Sur	Inactive	
109	Sigma Xi Delta		Saint Columban College	Pagadian, Zamboanga del Sur	Inactive	
110	Sigma Xi Epsilon		Zamboanga del Sur Maritime Institute of Technology	Pagadian, Zamboanga del Sur	Inactive	
111	Sigma Xi Gamma		Western Mindanao State University	Pagadian, Zamboanga del Sur	Inactive	
112	Sigma Xi Iota		Pagadian College of Criminology and Sciences	Pagadian, Zamboanga del Sur	Inactive	
113	Sigma Xi Kappa		Medina College-Pagadian	Pagadian, Zamboanga del Sur	Inactive	
114	Sigma Pi Alpha		University of Southern Mindanao	South Cotabato	Inactive	
115	Sigma Rho Alpha		Notre Dame of Dadiangas University	General Santos	Inactive	
116	Sigma Rho Beta		Mindanao State University–General Santos City	General Santos	Inactive	
117	Sigma Beta Nu		Mindanao Polytechnic College	General Santos	Inactive	
118	Sigma Upsilon		Notre Dame of Marbel University	Marbel, South Cotabato	Inactive	
119	Sigma Epsilon		Notre Dame of Cotabato	Cotabato City	Inactive	
120	Sigma Tau		Philippine Harvardian College	Cotabato City	Inactive	
121	**Sigma Rho Delta**		Southern City Colleges	Zamboanga City	Active	
122	Sigma Phi Alpha		University of Mindanao	Davao City	Inactive	
123	Sigma Phi Beta		University of Southeastern Philippines	Davao City	Inactive	
124	Sigma Phi Chi		Davao Doctors' College	Davao City	Inactive	
125	Sigma Phi Delta		University of Mindanao, Tagum College	Tagum, Davao	Inactive	
126	Sigma Phi Epsilon		St. Mary's College of Tagum	Tagum, Davao	Inactive	
127	Sigma Phi Gamma		University of Mindanao, Panabo	Panabo, Davao	Inactive	
128	Sigma Phi Kappa		AMA University Davao	Panabo, Davao	Inactive	(Note: Chapter was established at Harvardian College, now AMA University.)
129	Sigma Phi Lambda		Agro Industrial Foundation College of the Philippines	Davao City	Inactive	
130	Sigma Phi Rho		Ateneo de Zamboanga University	Zamboanga City	Inactive	
131	**Sigma Chi**		Zamboanga State College of Marine Sciences and Technology	Zamboanga City	Active	(Note: Chapter formed at Mindanao Regional School of Fisheries, now called the Zamboanga State College of Marine Sciences and Technology.)
132	**Sigma Psi**		Western Mindanao State University	Zamboanga City	Active	
133	**Sigma Omega**		Filipinas Technological Institute	Zamboanga City	Active	
134	**Sigma Sigma Alpha**		Zamboanga Peninsula Polytechnic State University	Zamboanga City	Active	
135	Sigma Sigma		Universidad de Zamboanga	Zamboanga City	Inactive	
136	Sigma Upsilon		Southern City Colleges	Zamboanga City	Inactive	
137	Sigma Nu		STI College, Zamboanga Campus	Zamboanga City	Inactive	
138	Sigma Chi Beta		Basilan State College	Isabela City, Basilan	Inactive	
139	Sigma Sigma Beta		Andres Bonifacio College	Dipolog	Inactive	
140	Sigma Sigma Gamma		Saint Vincent's College	Dipolog	Inactive	
141	Sigma Sigma Epsilon		Dipolog Medical Center College Foundation	Dipolog	Inactive	
142	Sigma Delta		Misamis University	Ozamiz	Inactive	
143	Sigma Sigma Delta		St. Paul University System	Surigao City	Inactive	
144	Sigma Sigma Eta		Surigao Education Center	Surigao City	Inactive	
145	Sigma Sigma Theta		Northeastern Mindanao Colleges	Surigao City	Inactive	
146	**Sigma Sigma Mu**		Surigao State College of Technology	Surigao City	Active	
147	**Sigma Sigma Kappa**		St. Jude Thaddeus Institute of Technology	Surigao City	Active	
148	Sigma Sigma Lambda		STI College	Surigao City	Inactive	
149	Sigma Sigma Nu		ACLC College	Surigao City	Inactive	
149	Sigma Sigma Omicron		Philippine Women's University, Surigao City	Surigao City	Inactive	
149	Sigma Sigma Pi		Surigao del Sur Polytechnic State College	Surigao del Sur	Inactive	
149	Sigma Sigma Gamma		Saint Michael College Cantilan	Cantilan, Surigao del Sur	Inactive	
150	Sigma Lambda		Caraga State University	Ampayon, Butuan	Inactive	(Note: Chapter was established at the Northern Mindanao State Institute of Science & Technology, which became Caraga State University in 2010.)
151	Sigma Kappa		Saint Joseph Institute of Technology	Butuan	Inactive	
152	Sigma Rho		Father Saturnino Urios University	Butuan	Inactive	
153	Sigma Pi		Agusan del Sur College	Bayugan, Agusan del Sur	Inactive	
154	**Sigma Theta**		Philippine Normal University	Prosperidad, Agusan del Sur	Active	
155	**Sigma Nu Alpha**		San Francisco Colleges	San Francisco, Agusan del Sur	Active	
156	Sigma Nu Beta		STI College	San Francisco, Agusan del Sur	Inactive	
157	Sigma Nu Delta		San Francisco Xavier College	San Francisco, Agusan del Sur	Inactive	
158	Sigma Nu Epsilon		SOCOTEC Certification Philippines	San Francisco, Agusan del Sur	Inactive	
159	Sigma Zeta		Notre Dame of Jolo College	Jolo, Sulu	Inactive	
160	Sigma Eta Beta		Sulu State College	Jolo, Sulu	Inactive	
161	Sigma Zeta Gamma		Mindanao State University–Sulu	Jolo, Sulu	Inactive	
162	Sigma Omicron		Central Sulu College	Siasi, Sulu	Inactive	
163	Sigma Xi Lambda		Tawi-Tawi Regional Agricultural College	Bongao, Tawi-Tawi	Inactive	
164	Sigma Xi Mu		Mindanao State University–Tawi-Tawi College of Technology and Oceanography	Sanga-Sanga, Bongao, Tawi-Tawi	Inactive	
