= Mindanao Association of State Tertiary Schools =

Higher educational institutions in Mindanao, Philippines

Mindanao Association of State Tertiary Schools, Inc. is an association of public Tertiary level schools in the Mindanao region of the Philippines. It is composed of the following schools:

== Members ==
- Basilan State University (BasSU)
- Bukidnon State University (BukSU)
- Camiguin Polytechnic State College (CPSC)
- Caraga State University (CSU)
- Central Mindanao University (CMU)
- Cotabato Foundation College of Science and Technology (CFCST)
- Cotabato State University (CotSU)
- Davao del Norte State College (DNSC)
- Davao Oriental State University (DOrSU)
- Jose Rizal Memorial State University (JRMSU)
- J.H. Cerilles State College (JHCSC)
- Mindanao State University Main (MSU Main)
- North Eastern Mindanao State University (NEMSU)
- Philippine Normal University-Agusan Campus (PNU-Agusan Campus)
- Southern Philippines Agri-Business and Marine and Aquatic School of Technology (SPAMAST)
- Sultan Kudarat State University (SKSU)
- Surigao del Norte State University (SNSU)
- University of Science and Technology of Southern Philippines (USTP)
- University of Southeastern Philippines (USeP)
- University of Southern Mindanao (USM)
- Western Mindanao State University (WMSU)
- Zamboanga State College of Marine Sciences and Technology (ZSCMST)
- Zamboanga Peninsula Polytechnic State University (ZPPSU)

Other SUCs

- Adiong Memorial Polytechnic State College (AMPSC)
- University of Northwestern Mindanao (UNM)
- Sulu State University (SSU)
- Mindanao State University – Maguindanao (MSU-Maguindanao)
- Mindanao State University – Gen. Santos (MSU-GenSan)
- Mindanao State University – Iligan Institute of Technology (MSU-IIT)
- Mindanao State University – Naawan (MSU-N)
- Tawi-Tawi Regional Agricultural College (TRAC)

== Athletics ==
The association hold annual games for qualifier in SCUAA meet. This include all sports contest.

== Socio-cultural festival ==
The association hold annual socio-cultural festival for qualifier in PASUC socio cultural meet. This include visual arts, literary and musical contest.
