= Philippine Association of State Universities and Colleges =

Public universities and colleges in the Philippines

- Abbreviation: PASUC
- Formation: 1967
- Headquarters: Diliman, Quezon City
- Location: Philippines
- Members: 113
- Website: pasuc.org.ph

The Philippine Association of State Universities and Colleges (PASUC) is an association of public tertiary school level institutions in the Philippines. These comprises all 113 State Universities and Colleges (SUC) which are under the Commission on Higher Education (CHED). PASUC holds its sports, literary, and musical competition annually participated by its member.

== Regional Members ==
The State Universities and Colleges (SUCs) members are grouped in three according to its region.

- Luzon Association of State Universities and Colleges (LASUC)
- Visayas Association of State Universities and Colleges (VASUC)
- Mindanao Association State Colleges and Universities Foundation (MASCUF)

== List of state-run colleges and universities by location ==
=== Luzon Association of State Universities and Colleges (LASUC) ===
| Institution | Province | President | Founded | Website |
|---|---|---|---|---|
| Don Mariano Marcos Memorial State University | La Union | Dr. Jaime I. Manuel, Jr. | 1981 | www.dmmmsu.edu.ph |
| Ilocos Sur Polytechnic State College | Ilocos Sur | Dr. Mario P. Obrero | 1998 | www.ispsc.edu.ph |
| Mariano Marcos State University | Ilocos Norte | Dr. Virgilio Julius P. Manzano, Jr. | 1978 | www.mmsu.edu.ph |
| Pangasinan State University | Pangasinan | Dr. Elbert M. Galas | 1979 | www.psu.edu.ph |
| University of Northern Philippines | Ilocos Sur | Dr. Erwin F. Cadorna | 1965 | www.unp.edu.ph |
| Abra State Institute of Science and Technology | Abra | Dr. Gregorio T. Tuqueza Jr. | 1983 | www.asist.edu.ph |
| Apayao State College | Apayao | Dr. John N. Cabansag | 1971 | www.asc.edu.ph |
| Benguet State University | Benguet | Dr. Kenneth A. Laruan | 1916 | www.bsu.edu.ph |
| Ifugao State University | Ifugao | Dr. Eva Marie Codamon-Dugyon | 1920 | www.ifsu.edu.ph |
| Kalinga State University | Kalinga | Dr. Joy Grace P. Doctor | 1986 | www.ksu.edu.ph |
| Mountain Province State University | Mountain Province | Dr. Edgar G. Cue | 1992 | mpsu.edu.ph |
| Batanes State College | Batanes | Dr. Alfonso R. Simon | 2004 | www.bscbatanes.edu.ph |
| Cagayan State University | Cagayan | Dr. Urdujah A. Tejada | 1978 | www.csu.edu.ph |
| Isabela State University | Isabela | Dr. Ricmar P. Aquino | 1978 | www.isu.edu.ph |
| Nueva Vizcaya State University | Nueva Vizcaya | Dr. Andres Z. Taguiam | 1916 | www.nvsu.edu.ph |
| Quirino State University | Quirino | Dr. Samuel O. Benigno | 1976 | www.qsu.edu.ph |
| Aurora State College of Technology | Aurora | Dr. Eutiquio L. Rotaquio Jr. | 1993 | www.ascot.edu.ph |
| Bataan Peninsula State University | Bataan | Dr. Gregorio J. Rodis | 1953 | www.bpsu.edu.ph |
| Bulacan Agricultural State College | Bulacan | Dr. Jameson H. Tan | 1952 | www.basc.edu.ph |
| Bulacan State University | Bulacan | Dr. Cecilia N. Gascon | 1904 | www.bulsu.edu.ph |
| Central Luzon State University | Nueva Ecija | Dr. Edgar A. Orden | 1907 | www.clsu.edu.ph |
| Pampanga State University | Pampanga | Dr. Enrique Baking | 1861 | www.pampangastateu.edu.ph |
| Nueva Ecija University of Science and Technology | Nueva Ecija | Dr. Rhodora R. Jugo | 1908 | www.neust.edu.ph |
| Pampanga State Agricultural University | Pampanga | Dr. Honorio M. Soriano Jr. | 1974 | www.psau.edu.ph |
| Philippine Merchant Marine Academy | Zambales | Commo. Joel Y. Abutal, PMMA (Superintendent) | 1820 | www.pmma.edu.ph |
| President Ramon Magsaysay State University | Zambales | Dr. Cornelio C. Garcia | 1910 | www.prmsu.edu.ph |
| Tarlac Agricultural University | Tarlac | Dr. Max P. Guillermo | 1945 | www.tca.edu.ph |
| Tarlac State University | Tarlac | Dr. Myrna Q. Mallari | 1906 | www.tsu.edu.ph |
| Batangas State University | Batangas | Dr. Tirso A. Ronquillo | 1903 | www.batstate-u.edu.ph |
| Cavite State University | Cavite | Dr. Maria Agnes P. Nuestro | 1906 | www.cvsu.edu.ph |
| Laguna State Polytechnic University | Laguna | Dr. Mario R. Briones | 1954 | www.lspu.edu.ph |
| Southern Luzon State University | Quezon | Dr. Doracie B. Zoleta-Nantes | 1964 | www.slsu.edu.ph |
| University of Rizal System | Rizal | Dr. Nancy T. Pascual | 1956 | www.urs.edu.ph |
| Marinduque State University | Marinduque | Dr. Diosdado P. Zulueta | 1952 | marsu.edu.ph |
| Mindoro State University | Oriental Mindoro | Dr. Enya Marie D. Apostol | 1951 | minsu.edu.ph |
| Occidental Mindoro State University | Occidental Mindoro | Dr. Elbert C. Edaniol | 1966 | omsc.edu.ph |
| Palawan State University | Palawan | Dr. Ramon M. Docto | 1965 | psu.palawan.edu.ph |
| Romblon State University | Romblon | Dr. Merian P. Catajay-Mani | 1915 | rsu.edu.ph |
| Western Philippines University | Palawan | Dr. Amabel S. Liao | 1910 | wpu.edu.ph |
| Southeast Asian University of Technology | Camarines Sur | Dr. Richard H. Cordial | 1911 | www.biscast.edu.ph |
| Bicol University | Albay | Dr. Arnulfo M. Mascariñas | 1969 | www.bicol-u.edu.ph |
| University of Camarines Norte | Camarines Norte | Dr. Rusty G. Abanto | 1992 | www.cnsc.edu.ph |
| Catanduanes State University | Catanduanes | Dr. Patrick Alain T. Azanza | 1961 | www.catanduanesstateu.edu.ph |
| Central Bicol State University of Agriculture | Camarines Sur | Dr. Alberto N. Naperi | 1918 | www.cbsua.edu.ph |
| Dr. Emilio B. Espinosa Sr. Memorial State College of Agriculture and Technology | Masbate | Dr. Renee A. Lamela | 1952 | www.debesmscat.edu.ph |
| Partido State University | Camarines Sur | Dr. Raul G. Bradecina | 1941 | www.parsu.edu.ph |
| Polytechnic State University of Bicol | Camarines Sur | Dr. Charlito P. Cadag | 1983 | www.cspc.edu.ph |
| Sorsogon State University | Sorsogon | Dr. Geraldine F. De Jesus | 1993 | www.sorsu.edu.ph |

=== National Capital Region (NCR) members ===
| Institution | Location | President | Founded | Website |
|---|---|---|---|---|
| Eulogio "Amang" Rodriguez Institute of Science and Technology | Manila | Dr. Editha V. Pillo | 1945 | www.earist.edu.ph |
| Marikina Polytechnic College | Marikina | Dr. Joselito B. Gutierrez | 1947 | http://mpc.edu.ph/ |
| Philippine Normal University | Manila | Dr. Bert J. Tuga | 1901 | www.pnu.edu.ph |
| National Aviation Academy of the Philippines | Pasay | Dr. Marwin M. Dela Cruz | 1969 | www.philsca.edu.ph |
| Polytechnic University of the Philippines | Manila | Dr. Manuel M. Muhi | 1904 | www.pup.edu.ph |
| Rizal Technological University | Mandaluyong | Dr. Ma. Eugenia M. Yangco | 1969 | www.rtu.edu.ph |
| Technological University of the Philippines | Manila | Dr. Jesus Rodrigo F. Torres | 1901 | www.tup.edu.ph |
| University of the Philippines System | Philippines | Angelo Jimenez | 1908 | www.up.edu.ph |

=== Visayas Association of State Universities and Colleges (VASUC) ===
| Institution | Province | President | Founded | Website |
|---|---|---|---|---|
| Aklan State University | Aklan | Dr. Jeffrey A. Clarin | 1917 | www.asu.edu.ph |
| Capiz State University | Capiz | Dr. Efren L. Linan | 1980 | www.capsu.edu.ph |
| Carlos Hilado Memorial State University | Negros Occidental | Dr. Norberto P. Mangulabnan | 1954 | chmsu.edu.ph |
| Central Philippines State University | Negros Occidental | Dr. Aladino C. Moraca | 1946 | www.cpsu.edu.ph |
| Guimaras State University | Guimaras | Dr. Lilian Diana B. Parreño | 1968 | www.gsu.edu.ph |
| Iloilo Science and Technology University | Iloilo | Dr. Gabriel M. Salistre | 1905 | www.isatu.edu.ph |
| Iloilo State University of Fisheries Science and Technology | Iloilo | Dr. Nordy D. Siason, Jr. | 1957 | www.isufst.edu.ph |
| Northern Iloilo State University | Iloilo | Dr. Bobby D. Gerardo | 1956 | www.nisu.edu.ph |
| State University of Northern Negros | Negros Occidental | Dr. Renante A. Egcas | 1998 | www.sunn.edu.ph |
| University of Antique | Antique | Dr. Pablo S. Crespo, Jr. | 1954 | www.antiquespride.edu.ph |
| West Visayas State University | Iloilo | Dr. Joselito F. Villaruz | 1902 | www.wvsu.edu.ph |
| University of the Philippines Visayas | Iloilo | Dr. Clement C. Camposano, Chancellor | 1947 | upv.edu.ph |
| Bohol Island State University | Bohol | Dr. Anthony M. Penaso | 1998 | www.bisu.edu.ph |
| Cebu Normal University | Cebu | Dr. Daniel A. Ariaso, Sr. | 1902 | www.cnu.edu.ph |
| Cebu Technological University | Cebu | Dr. Joseph C. Pepito | 1911 | www.ctu.edu.ph |
| Negros Oriental State University | Negros Oriental | Dr. Noel Marjon E. Yasi | 1907 | www.norsu.edu.ph |
| Siquijor State College | Siquijor | Dr. Steven J. Sumaylo | 1920 | siquijorstate.edu.ph |
| University of the Philippines Cebu | Cebu | Atty. Leo B. Malagar, Chancellor | 1918 | upcebu.edu.ph |
| Biliran Province State University | Biliran | Dr. Victor C. Cañezo, Jr. | 1945 | www.bipsu.edu.ph |
| Eastern Samar State University | Eastern Samar | Dr. Andres C. Pagatpatan, Jr. | 1960 | essu.edu.ph |
| Eastern Visayas State University | Leyte | Dr. Dennis C. de Paz | 1907 | www.evsu.edu.ph |
| Leyte Normal University | Leyte | Dr. Evelyn B. Aguirre | 1921 | www.lnu.edu.ph |
| Northwest Samar State University | Samar | Dr. Benjamin L. Pecayo | 1959 | www.nwssu.edu.ph |
| Palompon Institute of Technology | Leyte | Dr. Dennis A. Del Pilar | 1964 | www.pit.edu.ph |
| Samar State University | Samar | Dr. Redentor S. Palencia | 1912 | www.ssu.edu.ph |
| Southern Leyte State University | Southern Leyte | Dr. Jude A. Duarte | 1969 | southernleytestateu.edu.ph |
| University of Eastern Philippines | Northern Samar | Dr. Cherry I. Ultra | 1918 | uep.edu.ph |
| University of the Philippines Tacloban | Leyte | Patricia B. Arinto, Dean | 1973 | www.uptacloban.edu.ph |
| Visayas State University | Leyte | Dr. Prose Ivy G. Yepes | 1924 | www.vsu.edu.ph |

=== Mindanao Association State Tertiary Schools (MASTS) ===
| Institution | Province | President | Founded | Website |
|---|---|---|---|---|
| J.H. Cerilles State College | Zamboanga del Sur | Dr. Edgardo H. Rosales | 1999 | www.jhcsc.edu.ph |
| Jose Rizal Memorial State University | Zamboanga del Norte | Dr. Nelson P. Cabral, OIC | 1996 | www.jrmsu.edu.ph |
| Western Mindanao State University | Zamboanga City | Dr. Ma. Carla A. Ochotorena | 1904 | www.wmsu.edu.ph |
| Zamboanga Peninsula Polytechnic State University | Zamboanga City | Dr. Nelson P. Cabral | 1905 | www.zppsu.edu.ph |
| Zamboanga State College of Marine Sciences and Technology | Zamboanga City | Dr. Jaime G. Jalon | 1956 | www.zscmst.edu.ph |
| Bukidnon State University | Bukidnon | Dr. Joy M. Mirasol | 1924 | www.buksu.edu.ph |
| Camiguin Polytechnic State College | Camiguin | Dr. Macario B. Oclarit | 1995 | www.cpsc.edu.ph |
| Central Mindanao University | Bukidnon | Dr. Rolito G. Eballe | 1910 | www.cmu.edu.ph |
| Mindanao State University - Iligan Institute of Technology | Lanao del Norte | Atty. Alizedney M. Ditucalan, Chancellor | 1968 | www.msuiit.edu.ph |
| Mindanao State University - Naawan | Misamis Oriental | Dr. Elnor C. Roa, Chancellor | 1973 | www.msunaawan.edu.ph |
| Northern Bukidnon State College | Bukidnon | Dr. Catherine Roween C. Almaden | 2005 | nbsc.edu.ph |
| University of Northwestern Mindanao | Misamis Occidental | Dr. Herbert Glenn P. Reyes | 1971 | www.nmsc.edu.ph |
| University of Science and Technology of Southern Philippines | Misamis Oriental | Dr. Ambrosio B. Cultura II | 1927 | www.ustp.edu.ph |
| Davao de Oro State College | Davao de Oro | Dr. Christie Jean V. Ganiera | 2013 | www.cvsc.edu.ph |
| Davao del Norte State College | Davao del Norte | Dr. Joy M. Sorrosa | 1995 | www.dnsc.edu.ph |
| Davao del Sur State College | Davao del Sur | Dr. Augie E. Fuentes | 2019 | www.dssc.edu.ph |
| Davao Oriental State University | Davao Oriental | Dr. Edito B. Sumile | 1989 | www.doscst.edu.ph |
| Southern Philippines Agri-Business and Marine and Aquatic School of Technology | Davao Occidental | Dr. Ruth S. Lucero | 1966 | www.spamast.edu.ph |
| University of Southeastern Philippines | Davao City | Dr. Lourdes C. Generalao | 1978 | www.usep.edu.ph |
| Cotabato Foundation College of Science and Technology | Cotabato | Dr. Ali K. Dilangalen | 1967 | www.cfcst.edu.ph |
| Mindanao State University - General Santos | South Cotabato | JD Usman D. Aragasi, Acting Chancellor | 1967 | www.msugensan.edu.ph |
| Sultan Kudarat State University | Sultan Kudarat | Dr. Samson L. Molao | 1990 | www.sksu.edu.ph |
| University of Southern Mindanao | Cotabato | Dr. Jonald L. Pimentel | 1952 | www.usm.edu.ph |
| Agusan del Sur State University | Agusan del Sur | Dr. Joy C. Capistrano | 1908 | www.asscat.edu.ph |
| Caraga State University | Agusan del Norte | Dr. Rolyn C. Daguil | 1946 | www.carsu.edu.ph |
| North Eastern Mindanao State University | Surigao del Sur | Dr. Baceledes R. Estal | 1982 | www.sdssu.edu.ph |
| Surigao State College of Technology | Surigao del Norte | Dr. Gregorio Z. Gamboa Jr. | 1998 | www.ssct.edu.ph |
| Adiong Memorial State College | Lanao del Sur | Dr. Sherifa Rohannie O. Kadil-Adiong | 1999 | |
| Basilan State University | Basilan | Dr. Haipa Abdurahim-Salain | 1984 | www.bassc.edu.ph |
| Cotabato State University | Cotabato City | Dr. Sema G. Dilna | 1924 | www.ccspc.edu.ph |
| Mindanao State University | Lanao del Sur | Atty. Basari D. Mapupuno | 1961 | www.msumain.edu.ph |
| Mindanao State University - Maguindanao | Maguindanao del Norte | Dr. Bai Hejira Nefertiti S. Macalandong-Limbona, Chancellor | 1973 | www.msumaguindanao.edu.ph |
| Mindanao State University - Tawi-Tawi College of Technology and Oceanography | Tawi-Tawi | Dr. Mary Joyce Z. Guinto-Sali, Chancellor | 1983 | www.msutawi-tawi.edu.ph |
| Sulu State University | Sulu | Prof. Charisma S. Ututalum | 1982 | www.sulustatecollege.edu.ph |
| Tawi-Tawi Regional Agricultural College | Tawi-Tawi | Dr. Mutti Asaali | 1957 | |
