= Mindanao State University–Zamboanga Sibugay =

Public university in Zamboanga Sibugay, Philippines

Mindanao State University Zamboanga Sibugay
- Pamantasang Pampamahalaan ng Mindanao–Zamboanga Sibugay (Filipino)
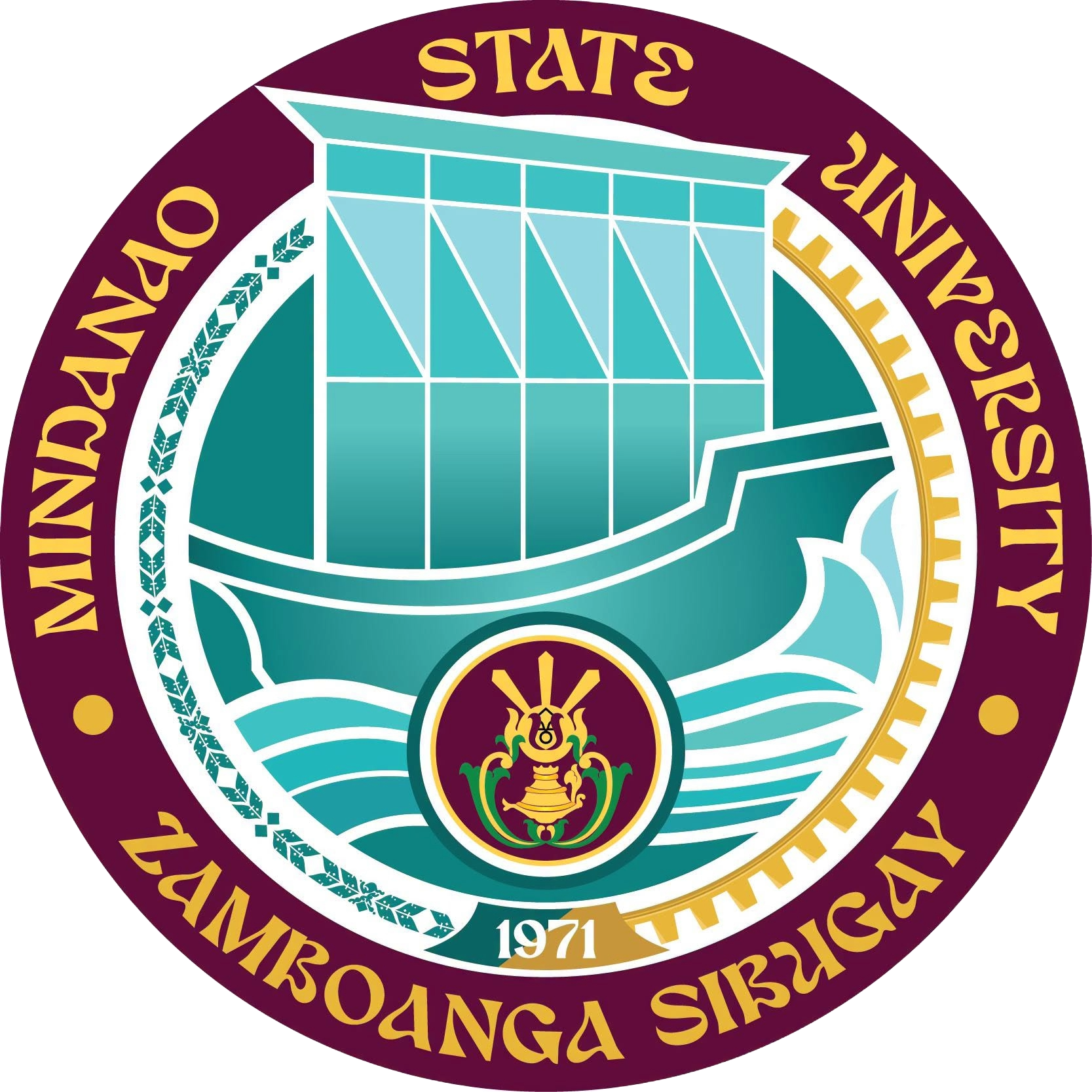
- Official Seal
- Former name: Mindanao State University-Buug
- Motto: Empowering Minds, Enriching Communities
- Type: Public, State University
- Established: 1971
- Chancellor: Sheila G. Magolama
- President: Paisalin P. Tago
- Faculty: 96
- Administrative staff: 47
- Students: 1900+
- Location: Datu Panas, Buug, Zamboanga Sibugay, Philippines; 7°43′26″N 123°03′31″E
- Campus: 6 hectares
- Hymn: Himno ng Pamantasang Mindanao
- Colors: Maroon Gold
- Nickname: MSUans
- Mascot: Dragons
- Website: msuzs.edu.ph
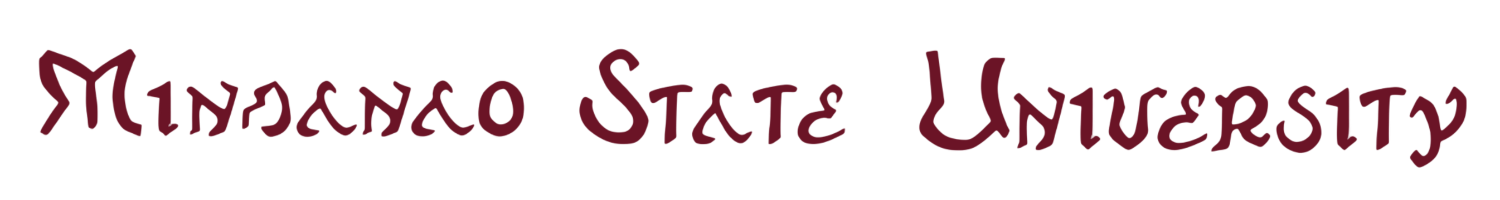

- Location in Mindanao Location in the Philippines

Mindanao State University–Zamboanga Sibugay, formerly known as Mindanao State University–Buug, is a public university and the eighth autonomous campus of the Mindanao State University System located in Datu Panas, Buug, Zamboanga Sibugay, Philippines. Established in 1971 as MSU-Buug Community High School, it is one of the premier constituent institutions of the MSU System in Zamboanga Peninsula, alongside MSU–Sulu.

== History ==
The Mindanao State University–Zamboanga Sibugay (MSU–Zamboanga Sibugay) was established in 1971 as MSU–Buug Community High School. It was subsidized by MSU-Marawi Campus from 1974 by virtue of BOR Resolution No. 1030.

In 1982, the school was elevated to collegiate level and renamed as MSU–Buug College. It was authorized to offer general college courses by virtue of BOR Resolution Nos. 492 and 492-B, respectively. It was subsequently authorized to offer complete courses in Agriculture, Forestry, Education and Arts through BOR Resolution No. 55, series of 1989.

Despite this elevation into a collegiate unit, MSU–Buug operated under its budget as high school entity. It was placed under the direct supervision of the Office of the Assistant Vice Chancellor for Academic Affairs (External Studies). In 2002, by virtue of Special Order No. 581-OP, MSU-Buug was revitalized by the modification of its structure which subsequently transferred the supervision of the Unit to the Office of the Vice Chancellor for Academic Affairs. MSU-Buug then became one of the colleges of Mindanao State University System and such, it was headed by a Director/Dean.

On September 30, 2010, BOR Resolution No. 168 was adopted by the Board of Regents granting autonomous status to MSU Buug with financial dependency to the main campus.

The first election for regular chancellor was held on September 12, 2012, with Sultan Taha G. Sarip elected by the Board as the first regular chancellor. Followed by Pangandag M. Magolama on December 18, 2018, and Sheila G. Magolama as the current chancellor since November 26, 2024.

On December 2025, MSU–Buug was formally renamed to MSU–Zamboanga Sibugay, reflecting the institution's commitment to serving the people of Zamboanga Sibugay.

== Academics ==
MSU–Zamboanga Sibugay is composed of six colleges - the College of Agriculture and Fisheries, College of Arts and Sciences, College of Education, College of Forestry and Environmental Studies, College of Hospitality, Administration, and Computing Studies, and College of Nursing; a graduate school (School of Graduate Studies), a senior high school, and a laboratory junior high school (College of Education Training Department).

=== Graduate School ===
- Master of Arts in Education
  - major in School Administration
- Master of Arts in Peace and Development Studies
- Master of Science in Animal Science
- Master of Science in Farming Systems

=== College of Agriculture and Fisheries ===
- Bachelor of Science in Agriculture
  - major in Agronomy
  - major in Animal Science
  - major in Farming Systems
- Diploma in Agriculture Technology
  - major in Crop Production Technology
- Bachelor of Science in Fisheries
- Diploma in Fish Technology
  - major in Aquaculture
  - major in Fish Processing

=== College of Arts and Sciences ===
- Bachelor of Arts in English Language Studies
- Batsilyer ng Sining sa Filipino

=== College of Education ===
- Bachelor of Elementary Education
  - General Education
- Bachelor of Secondary Education
  - major in English
  - major in Filipino
  - major in Mathematics
  - major in Sciences
- Professional Education Course

=== College of Forestry and Environmental Studies ===
- Bachelor of Science in Forestry
  - major in Agro-Forestry
- Bachelor of Science in Environmental Science
- Forest Ranger Certificate

=== College of Hospitality, Administration, and Computing Studies ===
- Bachelor in Hospitality Management
- Bachelor in Public Administration
  - major in Fiscal Administration
  - major in Human Resource Management
  - major in Organization and Management
- Bachelor of Science in Information Technology

=== College of Nursing ===
- Bachelor of Science in Nursing

== Admission ==
All freshmen applicants should take and pass the Mindanao State University System Admission and Scholarship Examination (SASE) or the College Entrance Test (CET) for MSU-Zamboanga Sibugay.
