= University of Northwestern Mindanao =

Public university in Misamis Occidental, Philippines

- Pamantasan ng Hilaga-Kanluraning Mindanao (Filipino)
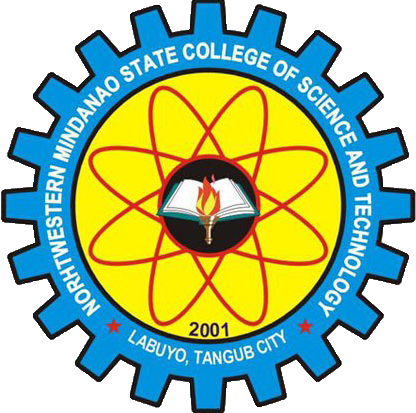
- Former names: Tangub Agro-Industrial School (1971–2001); Northwestern Mindanao State College of Science and Technology (2001-2026)
- Motto: "Molder of Hearts and Minds"
- Type: State University
- Established: 1971
- Academic affiliations: PASUC, MASCUF
- President: Dr. Reynaldo E. Manuel Jr., CESO V
- Vice-president: Dr. Rowena D. Jaber (VP for Academic Affairs)
- Faculty: c. 60
- Administrative staff: c. 50
- Students: 7,000
- Undergraduates: 2500
- Location: Labuyo, Tangub City, Misamis Occidental, Philippines; 8°03′30″N 123°43′15″E
- Colors: Sky blue
- Nickname: Blue Generals
- Website: www.nmsc.edu.ph
- Location in Mindanao Location in the Philippines

The University of Northwestern Mindanao is a state university in Tangub City, Misamis Occidental, Philippines. It is mandated to primarily offer higher professional, technical instructions for special purposes and promote research and extension services, advanced studies and progressive leadership in education, agriculture, fishery, engineering, arts and sciences, short-term vocational-technical and other continuing courses as may be relevant. It is also the first state university in Misamis Occidental.

It shall also provide primary consideration to the integration of researches/ studies for the development of the Province of Misamis Occidental. Its main campus is located in Barangay Labuyo, Tangub City.

Previously known as the Northwestern Mindanao State College of Science and Technology, the college was elevated to university status through Republic Act No. 11186, which was signed by former president Rodrigo Duterte on January 10, 2019 and was officially proclaimed on May 25, 2026 the Commission on Higher Education CHED En-Banc promulgated its decision confirming the university status though Resolution No. 310-2026 as certified by CHED Region X Office on June 11, 2026.

== History ==
The University of Northwestern Mindanao started as Tangub Agro-Industrial School (TANAIS) in Sumirap, Tangub City in 1971, offering secondary agriculture and trade curricula with Mr. Jesus T. Bonilla as principal. On June 26, 1973, the school was transferred to Labuyo, Tangub City, three kilometers from the city proper and approximately four hundred meters from the national highway, with Dr. Perfecto B. Yebes as the Vocational School Administrator. The school started offering post secondary courses in 1974 and had been an affiliate off-campus institute of the Central Mindanao University, Musuan, Bukidnon from 1979 to 1984. In 1994, bachelor's degree in Secondary Education and Industrial Technology were then offered. With the promotion of Dr. Yebes to a higher position, Mr. Apolonio S. Vidallo took place of the former position and was appointed as the third administrator of TANAIS on August 6, 1996.

Prior to Dr. Yebes' promotion in 1992, he and Atty. Philip T. Tan, the City Mayor of Tangub at that time, conceived the idea of converting TANAIS into a state college. The proposal was filed in Congress by the late Hon. Hilarion Ramiro Jr., the Congressman of the 2nd District of Misamis Occidental at that time. The bill was not passed due to adjournment or the 9th Congress in 1995. The bill to convert TANAIS into a State College was refilled in the 10th Congress in 1995 by Congresswoman Herminia M. Ramiro. The bill passed both houses but with a last minute amendment to transfer the main campus from TANAIS in Tangub City to Oroquieta Agro-Industrial School (OAIS) at Oroquieta City. Learning the amendment, Mayor Tan and Mr. Numeriano L. Gilbolingo and conferred with Congresswoman Herminia M. Ramiro to find the constitutional ground and had bill vetoed by President Fidel V. Ramos.

The bill was refiled in 1998 by the late Congressman Hilarion A. Ramiro Jr. It has already passed the lower house in 2000. By December 2000, Congressman Ramiro, Mayor Philip T. Tan, wife Jennifer Wee Tan and Mr. Numeriano L. Gilbolingo who represented Administrator Apolonio S. Vidallo successfully defended the conversion of Tangub Agro-Industrial School into Northwestern Mindanao State College of Science and Technology (NMSC) before the Senate Committee on Education chaired by the Honorable Sen. Teresita Aquino Oreta with the endorsement of Dr. Ester A. Garcia, Chairperson of the Commission on Higher Education.

Unfortunately, Congressman Ramiro died in January 2001. Congresswoman Herminia A. Ramiro was elected in May 2001, replacing the late Congressman Hilarion Ramiro Jr. With joint effort of Atty. Philip T. Tan and Congresswoman Herminia A. Ramiro, R.A. 9146 was finally approved by President Gloria Macapagal-Arroyo on July 30, 2001.

Dr. Zenaida G. Gersana was then designated by the Commission on Higher Education as the Officer-In-Charge and the Board of Trustees (BOT) was created to serve as its governing body.

On May 26, 2003, the board of trustees unanimously elected and appointed Atty. Philip T. Tan, CPA as the First President of NMSC after a two-month exhaustive selection process conducted by the Search Committee for Presidency (SCP). Dr. Glory S. Magdale, former Regional Director of the Commission on Higher Education, Region X, Cagayan de Oro City chaired the Search Committee for the Presidency.

During the presidency of Atty. Tan, infrastructure projects flourished in the college. Among these are the twenty-classroom Academic Building, the Legarda Hall which is a laboratory building for students enrolled in Hospitality Management, Student Food Court and renovated Administration Offices. The projects significantly improved the physical facilities of the college.

The college occupies a total of 29 hectares campus site traversed by the barangay road leading to Panguil Bay, an area rich in marine resources with vast potentials suitable for home and industrial uses.

With the initiative of Atty. Philip Tan, the Php 5.4 Million pesos financial assistance from the Department of Science and Technology for the upgrading of the Science laboratory of the college was finally approved.

Upon the resignation of Atty. Philip T. Tan as College President, the President of Mindanao University of Science and Technology (MUST) was designated by the Board of Trustees as Officer In-Charge of the college in March 2010 by virtue of BOT Resolution No. 03,s. 2010.

With the active and participative leadership of Dr. Rotoras, the college hurdled its share of challenges and the second release of the DOST financial assistance was undertaken.

On September 6, 2012, Dr. Jennifer W. Tan was unanimously elected and appointed by the Board of Trustees as second President of the college by virtue of BOT Resolution No. 26,s. 2012.

The third College President was Dr. Glenn Reyes.

Fast forward to November 20, 2017. Then Second District Representative and now Governor Hon. Henry S. Oaminal Sr. filed House Bill No. 6465 reviving the quest for the university status of NMSCST and was signed into law by President Rodrigo Duterte on January 10, 2019 by virtue of Republic Act 11186.

Under Section 26 of the Act, the institution would attain university status only after the Commission on Higher Education (CHED), based on the recommendation of an independent panel of experts, determined that it had complied with all statutory and regulatory requirements for the establishment of a state university. During this transition period, the institution undertook initiatives to strengthen its academic programs, governance structure, infrastructure, research capability, and quality assurance mechanisms in preparation for the grant of full university status.

Six years after following the completion of the required evaluations and compliance processes, the CHED En Banc adopted Resolution No. 310-2026 on 25 May 2026, declaring that the institution had satisfied the requirements prescribed under Republic Act No. 11186. The resolution was subsequently certified by CHED Regional Office X on June 11, 2026, thereby confirming the university status of the University of Northwestern Mindanao and formally completing its transition from the former Northwestern Mindanao State College of Science and Technology.

At the time of the conversion, NMSCST College President Dr. Reynaldo E. Manuel Jr., CESO V, who was elected on April 6, 2026, assumed as the university's first president on April 8, 2026.

With the confirmation of its university status, the institution entered a new phase of development focused on broadening its academic programs, expanding research and innovation, and deepening its community engagement and international partnerships. The transition also marked the beginning of governance under the framework prescribed for state universities under Republic Act No. 11186, including the eventual constitution of its governing bodies and the continued pursuit of excellence in instruction, research, extension, and production as a regional center of higher learning in Northwestern Mindanao.

== Academic Programs Offered ==
UNM's academic programs operate on a semester calendar beginning in early June and ending in late March.

=== Bachelor's degree programs ===
College of Agriculture and Environmental Science

- Bachelor of Science in Agriculture
  - Major in Animal Science
  - Major in Crop Science
- Bachelor of Science in Environmental Science

College of Arts, Humanities and Social Sciences

- Bachelor of Arts in English Language Studies
- Bachelor of Arts in Literature
- Bachelor of Arts in Political Science
- Bachelor of Science in Development Communication

College of Business Administration and Management

- Bachelor of Science in Hospitality Management
- Bachelor of Science in Tourism Management

College of Education

- Bachelor in Elementary Education
  - Major in General Education
- Bachelor in Secondary Education
  - Major in Mathematics
  - Major in Biology

College of Engineering and Technology

- Bachelor in Engineering Technology
  - Major in Mechanical Engineering Technology
  - Major in Construction Engineering Technology
  - Major in Electronics Engineering Technology
  - Major in Electrical Engineering Technology
- Bachelor of Science in Industrial Technology
  - Major in Automotive Technology
  - Major in Electrical Technology
  - Major in Electronics Technology
  - Major in Food Technology
  - Major in Computer Technology

College of Information and Communication Technology

- Bachelor of Science in Information Technology
- Bachelor of Science in Information System
- Bachelor of Science in Animation and Multimedia Arts

==== College of Mathematics and Natural Sciences ====
- Bachelor of Science in Biology
- Bachelor of Science in Mathematics

== Research and Extension ==
Upon his assumption, Dr Reyes designated Dr Nabua as the Vice-President for Research, Innovation, Development and Extension with Mr Joseph Meynard Ogdol (as Research Director); Orlando Rosauro, Jr (as Innovation and Development); and, Dr Joel R Dagot (as Extension Director).

In March 2020, the COVID-19 pandemic reached the Philippines and the national lockdown followed immediately thereafter. This caused stoppage of work and classes at NMSCST. Dr Reyes and his team immediately responded to the challenges brought about by the virus. Innovative and responsive learning modalities were introduced – online, modular, and blended learning- to the students.

By November 2020, Dr Dionalyn S Gumacial was designated as the new Research Director and Mr Evans Rosauro I Yonson as the new Extension and Community Development Director. A series of write shops was conducted to equip the NMSCST faculty on research and development. NMSCST heeded the call of the local government of Tangub City to offer government in conducting extension programs in four Tangub barangays – Fertig Hills (Hoyohoy), Owayan, San Antonio, and Sicot. Works in the updating the RIDE manuals started in January 2021.

Dr Rowena D Jaber came in as Vice-President for RIDE effective November, 2021 with Mr Rodrin R Rivera as the new Research Director. Yonson remained as the Extension until June 2023.
