= Adiong Memorial State College =

Public college in Lanao del Sur, Philippines

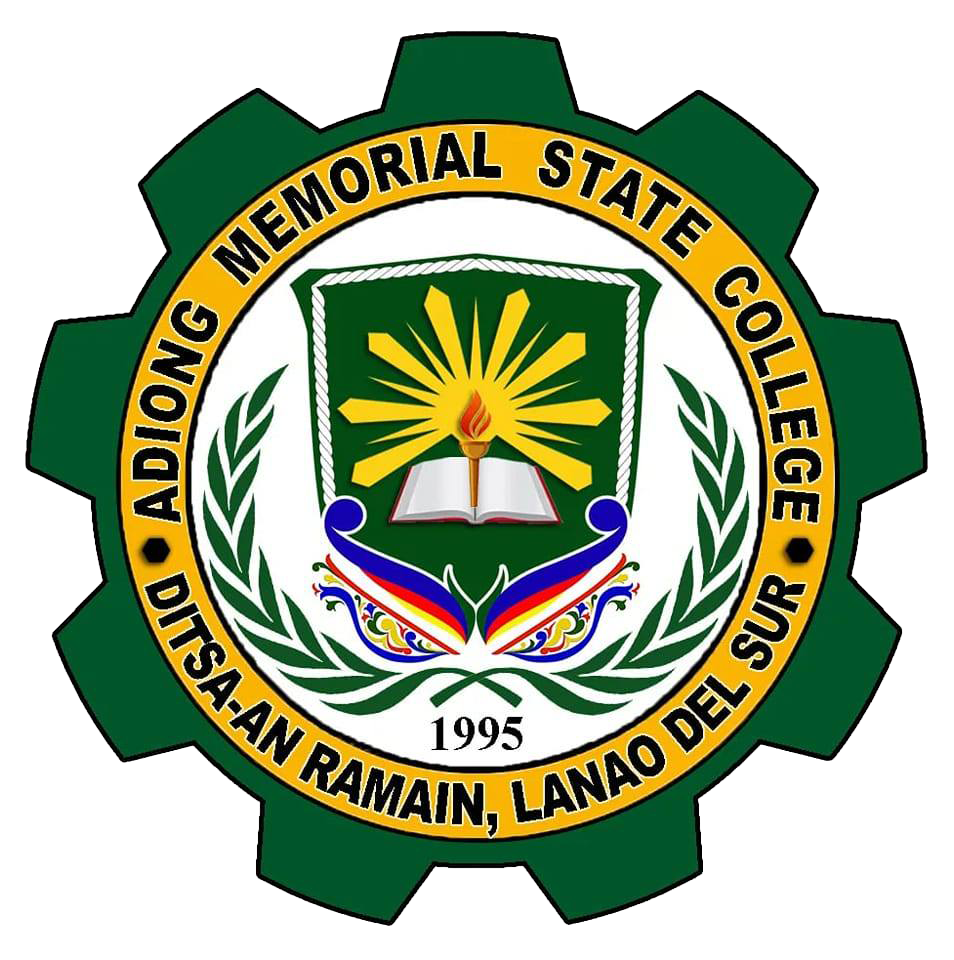
- Former names: Adiong Memorial Polytechnic College; Adiong Memorial Polytechnic State College
- Motto: Makabagong AMSC
- Motto in English: New AMSC
- Type: State college
- Established: June 10, 1998; 28 years ago
- Affiliations: Philippine Association of State Universities and Colleges; Mindanao Association of State Tertiary Schools
- President: Sherifa Rohannie K. Adiong
- Location: Ditsaan-Ramain, Lanao del Sur, Philippines; 7°58′44″N 124°21′40″E
- Colors
- Website: www.amsc-edu.ph
- Location in Mindanao Location in the Philippines

Adiong Memorial State College (AMSC), formerly Adiong Memorial Polytechnic State College, is a public state college in Ditsaan-Ramain, Lanao del Sur, Philippines. It offers professional, technical, and special instruction and conducts research and extension programs, with a focus on agriculture, forestry, ecology, and related fields.

== Creation ==
Through the initiatives of the late Governor Mamintal "Mike" M. Adiong Sr. during his time as Representative of Lanao del Sur, through the endorsement of the House of Representatives and the Senate of the Philippines, approved by President Fidel V. Ramos, the Adiong Memorial National High School was converted to Adiong Memorial Polytechnic College through Republic Act No. 7935 on March 1, 1995.

== Further history ==
On June 10, 1998, Republic Act No. 8651 was signed into law by President Fidel V. Ramos, converting Adiong Memorial Polytechnic College into a State College, thus renamed as Adiong Memorial Polytechnic State College.

On July 26, 2022, through the initiatives of Hon. Ansaruddin "Hooky" Alonto Adiong, the Representative from the First District of Lanao del Sur, the Adiong Memorial Polytechnic State College was renamed into Adiong Memorial State College by virtue of Republic Act No. 11756, signed into law by President Rodrigo Roa Duterte, and with the support of Hon. Mamintal "Bombit" Alonto Adiong, Jr., Governor of the Province of Lanao del Sur.

== Academic units ==
Undergraduate and Graduate Programs

- College of Agriculture
1. Bachelor of Science in Agriculture major in Farming System
- College of Business Administration
1. Bachelor of Science in Business Administration major in Human Resource Management
- College of Criminology
1. Bachelor of Science in Criminology
- College of Education
1. Bachelor of Elementary Education major in General Education
2. Bachelor of Secondary Education major in Social Studies
- College of Fisheries
1. Bachelor of Science in Fisheries
- College of Forestry
1. Bachelor of Science in Forestry major in General Forestry
- College of Information Technology
1. Bachelor of Science in Information Technology
- Graduate School
1. Certificate in Professional Teaching
2. Master of Arts in Education major in Educational Management

Secondary Education

- High School Department
1. Junior High School (Grades 7 to 10)
2. Senior High School - Accountancy and Business Management (ABM) track
3. Senior High School - Humanities and Social Sciences (HUMSS) track
4. Senior High School - Technical-Vocational Livelihood (TVL)
