= Camiguin Polytechnic State College =

Public college in Mambajao, Philippines

- Pampamahalaang Kolehiyo Politekniko ng Camiguin (Filipino)
- Former names: Camiguin School of Arts and Trades (1979–1995)
- Type: State College
- Established: 1995
- Affiliations: PASUC
- President: Dr. Macario B. Oclarit
- Vice-president: Dr. Nena B. Siaboc (VP for Academic Affairs)
- Location: Mambajao, Camiguin, Philippines; 9°14′35″N 124°43′47″E
- Campus: Main Campus; Catarman Campus
- Website: cpsc.edu.ph
- Location in Mindanao Location in the Philippines

Camiguin Polytechnic State College is a public college in the Philippines. It is mandated to provide higher professional, technical and special instructions for special purposes and to promote research and extension services, advanced studies and progressive leadership in agriculture, forestry, engineering, arts and sciences, and other relevant studies. Its main campus is located in Balbagon, Mambajao, Camiguin.
