= Sorsogon State University =

Public university in Sorsogon, Philippines

- Unibersidad Estatal kan Sorsogon; Pamantasang Pampamahalaan ng Sorsogon (Filipino)
- Former names: Sorsogon Trade School; Sorsogon School of Arts and Trades; Sorsogon College of Arts and Trades; Sorsogon State College
- Motto: Pamantasang May Puso
- Motto in English: University With A Heart
- Type: Provincial public higher education institution
- Established: 1993; 33 years ago
- Religious affiliation: Nonsectarian
- Academic affiliations: PASUC, AACCUP
- President: Dr. Geraldine F. De Jesus
- Vice-president: Mr.Gerald E. Fulay (Administration & Finance); Dr. Jhonner D. Ricafort (Academic Affairs); Dr. Ryan V. Dio (Research Extension & Training)
- Principal: Aldrin John J. Estonanto (Laboratory High School)
- Dean: Alfonso Garcia Jr (Education); Bernardo Quiñones (Technology); Rufo Durian III (Engineering and Architecture); Rose Anne Cleotilde Sambo (Agriculture); Lemy L. Villoso (BME Department); Rey Rodrigueza (ICT/Educ. Department)
- Location: Sorsogon City, Sorsogon, Philippines; 12°58′34″N 124°00′30″E
- Campus: Castilla Campus; Bulan Campus; Magallanes Campus; Sorsogon City Campus
- Colors: Maroon; Silver; Yellow
- Sporting affiliations: SCUAA
- Website: sorsu.edu.ph
- Location in Sorsogon Location in Luzon Location in the Philippines

Sorsogon State University (SorSU) is one of the oldest trade schools in the Philippines. It was established as Sorsogon Trade School in 1907, was renamed Sorsogon School of Arts and Trades by virtue of Republic Act 704 in June 1953 and again renamed Sorsogon College of Arts and Trades in 1976. In December 1993, after 86 years of existence, it was converted into a state college with three national vocational high schools in the province integrated to it. This was through R.A. 7666 authored by then Cong. Salvador H. Escudero III and Sen. Leticia Ramos Shahani, approved on December 31, 1993, by President Fidel V. Ramos.

The university was formed from a province-wide umbrella system where four vocational schools were integrated. The Sorsogon College of Arts and Trades (SCAT) became School of Industrial Technology and Education (SITE) to concentrate on Teacher Education and Technology. The Sorsogon National Agriculture School (SNAS) became School of Agriculture and Agriculture Based Technology (SAABT), to concentrate on Agriculture and Agriculture Based Technology. Bulan Vocational High School was renamed School of Arts and trades (SAT) and became Institute of Management and Information Technology (IMIT) to concentrate on Business Management and Information and Communications Technology (ICT), and Magallanes School of Fisheries became School of Fisheries and Fisheries Based Technology (SFFBT) to concentrate on Fishery Technology and Fisheries Resource Development. The main campus is on Magsaysay Street, Sorsogon City.

== History ==
The former Sorsogon State College was established in 1907 as the Sorsogon Provincial Trade School, an elementary school to train boys and girls with aptitude in the trades for immediate employment. Situated in a two-hectare campus, a portion of which is part of the present SSC Main Campus, the school initially offered woodworking as the only trade course for intermediate pupils. In the school year 1926-1927, the school began offering a second course and eventually phased out the elementary program. Then in 1950, it opened its doors to girls who could take food trades, cosmetology, or dressmaking for specialization.

By virtue of RA 704 dated May 14, 1952, it was renamed Sorsogon School of Arts and Trades (SSAT). The shop course offerings were expanded to include architectural drafting, building construction, electricity and furniture, and cabinet making. Two years later, the two-year technical course with specialization in the same trades as those for the second course was introduced.Soon machine shop practice, radio mechanics, automotive mechanics, and refrigeration and air conditioning were added as major courses.

On April 17, 1977, the Secretary of Education and Culture approved the school’s conversion into a tertiary institution as Sorsogon College of Arts and Trades (SCAT). With its new status, it began to offer a Bachelor of Science in Industrial Technology. These courses easily attracted enrollees, some of whom were graduates of the two-year technical course who, after having been out of school for a time, were given an opportunity to earn degrees. The first few batches of graduates easily found employment in the locality as well as in Metro Manila and abroad.

As early as mid-1970, during the term of Rep. Rafael C. Aquino, plans for the conversion of the school into a state college were brought about. Assemblyman Augusto Ortiz showed interest in pursuing a conversion move at the Batasang Pambansa, but there was a moratorium on the creation of state colleges and universities.

From the late 1970s through the early 1990s, SCAT, as an institution under the Bureau of Vocational Education, had strong support from the national government and some international organizations. Under the Technical-Vocational Education Project (PATVEP), many faculty members were recipients of scholarships in both the vocational and academic fields. As one of the ten TVEP schools in the country, SCAT obtained special funding for the offering of a Diploma in Technology. Many faculty members were sent to Australia for one-year training in technical fields under the Philippine Australia Technical-Vocational Program (PATVEP). Besides, the school was a recipient of a number of machines and equipment for mechanical technology, automotive technology, civil technology, and electrical technology from the Australian government. Some faculty members were also given the opportunity to study abroad through the Colombo Plan.

== 1990s ==
It was in the early 1990s when the conversion plans were pursued primarily through the efforts of Rep. Salvador H. Escudero III. While working for the passage of HB 4210, the congressman in coordination with the SCAT Officer-In-Charge, Dr. Bonifacio H. Ativo, initiated school-based activities in preparation for the transition. After the passage of the bill by the House, Sen. Leticia Ramos Shahani pushed for its passage in the Senate.

== Sorsogon State College ==
The Sorsogon State College was established by virtue of R.A 7666 approved on December 30, 1993, through the efforts of the late Congressman Salvador H. Escudero III. The College was formed from a province-wide umbrella system where four vocational schools were integrated. The Sorsogon College of Arts and Trades (SCAT) became the School of Industrial Technology and Education (SITE) to concentrate on Teacher Education and Technology. The Sorsogon National Agriculture School (SNAS) became the School of Agriculture and Agriculture Based Technology (SAABT), to concentrate on Agriculture and Agriculture Based Technology. Bulan Vocational High School was renamed School of Arts and trades (SAT) and became the Institute of Management and Information Technology (IMIT) to concentrate on Business Management and Information and Communications Technology (ICT), and Magallanes School of Fisheries became the School of Fisheries and Fisheries Based Technology (SFFBT) to concentrate on Fishery Technology and Fisheries Resource Development. The main campus is located at Magsaysay Street, Sorsogon City. Later, the campuses were renamed into Sorsogon State College Sorsogon City Campus, Bulan Campus, Castilla Campus, and Magallanes Campus only.

Dr. Augusto R. Nieves became the first president of the college and served for two terms. He instituted reforms in the academic and institutional policies, which contributed to the development of the college and to its prestige as a reputable institution in the province and in the region. He was succeeded by Dr. Antonio E. Fuentes who had two terms from 2005. During his term, he looked into the enhancement of the faculty development program, curriculum development, and program accreditation. Dr. Fuentes was succeeded by Dr. Modesto D. Detera who pushed for new course offerings, improved faculty development programs, and quality instruction which led to the increase of the number of Board Examination Topnotchers and Board Exam Passers. Likewise, research done by the college contributed much to the tourism and trade industry of the province. Following Dr. Detera is Dr. Helen R. Lara, the first woman president of Sorsogon State College.

== Conversion to Sorsogon State University ==
On October 11, 2018, House Bill No. 6203 sponsored by Hon. Congresswomen Evelina Escudero, Deogracias Ramos, and Anthony Bravo was enacted by President Rodrigo Duterte into law thru the Republic Act No. 11088 approving the conversion of Sorsogon State College into Sorsogon State University. It became a full-fledged university upon compliance with Section 19 of said Act and upon official declaration of the Commission on Higher Education last May 8, 2021. A University Declaration Ceremony was held as an official event to announce its conversion. It has gained recognition as one of the government agencies to be ISO 9001:2015 Quality Management System (QMS) certified. It is also a successful Bronze Awardee of the Program to Institutionalize Meritocracy and Excellence in Human Resource Management or the PRIME HRM in July 2019, and a holder of the Selyo ng Kahusayan sa Wika at Kultura. It produced 65 topnotchers in RME, REE, Civil Engineering, Mechanical Engineering, Electrical Engineering, Master in Electrical Engineering, Education, and Fisheries for the past 27 years.

At present, Sorsogon State University is charting its directions to be a research university producing globally competitive leaders and professionals. It is actively working on 100% accreditation of curricular programs, Institutional Sustainability Assessment or ISA Accreditation, and preparation for the establishment of Center of Development in Education and Engineering.

== Notes ==
- Republic Act No. 11088
- Republic Act No. 7666, Republic of the Philippines
- Sorsogon State College Code
