= Naawan =

Municipality in Misamis Oriental, Philippines

- Municipality
- Municipality of Naawan
- Municipal Hall

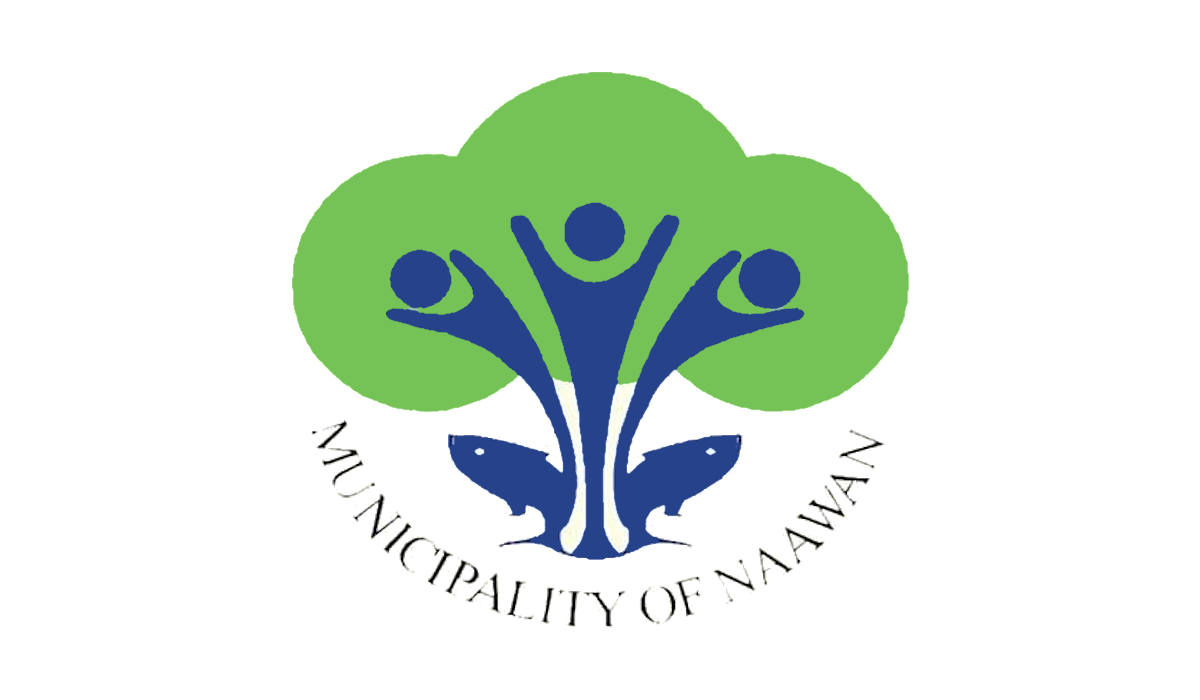
- Flag

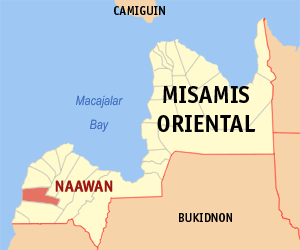
- Map of Misamis Oriental with Naawan highlighted
- Interactive map of Naawan
- Location within the Philippines
- Coordinates: 8°26′00″N 124°18′00″E
- Country: Philippines
- Region: Northern Mindanao
- Province: Misamis Oriental
- District: 2nd district
- Founded: June 14, 1957
- Barangays: 10 (see Barangays)

Government
  - Type: Sangguniang Bayan
  - Mayor: Dennis L. Roa
  - Vice Mayor: Allan B. Roa
  - Representative: Yevgeny Vincent B. Emano
  - Municipal Council: Members: Jaime C. Roa; Jeffrey S. Mahinay; Era Mae V. Macalong; Lea G. Buhian; Janeth A. Racines; Elmer C. Dadole; Fely C. Acera; Mark Ramnie P. Velez
  - Electorate: 16,357 voters (2025)

Area
  - Total: 88.50 km^{2} (34.17 sq mi)
- Elevation: 32 m (105 ft)
- Highest elevation: 293 m (961 ft)
- Lowest elevation: 0 m (0 ft)

Population (2024 census)
  - Total: 23,562
  - Density: 266.2/km^{2} (689.6/sq mi)
  - Households: 5,636

Economy
  - Income class: 3rd municipal income class
  - Poverty incidence: 23.2% (2023)
  - Revenue: ₱ 154.5 million (2024)
  - Assets: ₱ 622.5 million (2024)
  - Expenditure: ₱ 142.3 million (2024)
  - Liabilities: ₱ 290.8 million (2024)

Service provider
  - Electricity: Misamis Oriental 1 Rural Electric Cooperative (MORESCO 1)
- Time zone: UTC+8 (PST)
- ZIP code: 9023
- PSGC: 1004320000
- IDD : area code: +63 (0)88
- Native languages: Cebuano; Binukid; Subanon; Tagalog
- Website: www.naawanmisor.gov.ph

Naawan, officially the Municipality of Naawan (Cebuano: Lungsod sa Naawan; Tagalog: Bayan ng Naawan), is a municipality in the province of Misamis Oriental, Philippines. The population of the town is estimated to be 23,562 according to the 2024 census.

Naawan was named as the cleanest town in the Philippines in 2008.

== History ==
In 1957, the barrio of Naawan, then part of Initao, was incorporated into the town of Naawan. The process for incorporating Naawan, from Initao was started in 1956.

== Geography ==
=== Barangays ===
Naawan is politically subdivided into ten barangays. Each barangay consists of puroks while some have sitios.

- Don Pedro
- Linangkayan
- Lubilan
- Mapulog
- Maputi
- Mat-i
- Patag
- Poblacion
- Tagbalogo
- Tuboran

=== Climate ===
Climate data for Naawan, Misamis Oriental
Month	Jan	Feb	Mar	Apr	May	Jun	Jul	Aug	Sep	Oct	Nov	Dec	Year
Mean daily maximum °C (°F)	28 (82)	29 (84)	30 (86)	31 (88)	30 (86)	30 (86)	30 (86)	30 (86)	30 (86)	30 (86)	29 (84)	29 (84)	30 (85)
Mean daily minimum °C (°F)	24 (75)	24 (75)	24 (75)	25 (77)	26 (79)	26 (79)	25 (77)	25 (77)	25 (77)	25 (77)	25 (77)	25 (77)	25 (77)
Average precipitation mm (inches)	271 (10.7)	217 (8.5)	193 (7.6)	178 (7.0)	344 (13.5)	423 (16.7)	362 (14.3)	358 (14.1)	329 (13.0)	320 (12.6)	322 (12.7)	260 (10.2)	3,577 (140.9)
Average rainy days	23.2	19.5	22.0	22.8	29.6	28.9	30.3	29.8	28.1	28.8	26.1	24.1	313.2
Source: Meteoblue

== Education ==
Located in the town of Naawan is the Mindanao State University at Naawan campus, a unit of the Mindanao State University System. MSU-Naawan was established in the 1960s and 1970s as a scientific field laboratory for scientific research in the field along with the university's main campus in Marawi City, Lanao del Sur. With the involvement of Mindanao State University's College of Fisheries, the School of Marine Fisheries Technology graduated its first batch of university graduates in 1985. As an autonomous external campus and a distinct unit of the university system, the institute was known as the MSU-Institute of Fisheries Research & Development. It directly supervised the 'original' Naawan High School (the MSU-Naawan Fisheries High School after it was renamed the MSU-Naawan Fisheries High School). When the Naawan Central School's children's choir won first prize in the NAMCYA Children's Choir Finals at the Cultural Center of the Philippines in 1987, the school made a mark on the national stage.

== Demographics ==
Population census of Naawan

Year	Pop.	±% p.a.
1960	6,305	—
1970	8,718	+3.29%
1975	10,068	+2.93%
1980	12,215	+3.94%
1990	13,345	+0.89%
1995	14,578	+1.67%

Year	Pop.	±% p.a.
2000	16,173	+2.25%
2007	17,988	+1.48%
2010	18,895	+1.81%
2015	21,213	+2.23%
2020	22,444	+1.19%
2024	23,562	+1.17%

Source: Philippine Statistics Authority

In the 2024 census, the population of Naawan was 23,562 people, with a density of 270 inhabitants per square kilometre or 700 inhabitants per square mile.

== Economy ==
Poverty incidence of Naawan (%)

Source: Philippine Statistics Authority
