= North Eastern Mindanao State University =

Public university in Surigao del Sur, Philippines

- Former names: Surigao del Sur Polytechnic College (1992–2000); Surigao del Sur Polytechnic State College (2000–2010); Surigao del Sur State University (2010–2021)
- Motto: Carving a name in the map of higher education
- Type: State university
- Established: 1982
- Affiliations: SCUAA, MASTS, PASUC, and AACCUP
- President: Dr. Nemesio G. Loayon, EdD
- Location: Rosario, Tandag City, Surigao del Sur, Philippines; 9°02′22″N 126°12′58″E
- Campus: Multiple sites
- University Hymn: NEMSU Hymn
- Colours: Blue
- Website: www.nemsu.edu.ph
- Location in Mindanao Location in the Philippines

North Eastern Mindanao State University (NEMSU), formerly known as Surigao del Sur State University, is a state university system located in the province of Surigao del Sur. Its main campus is located in Tandag, with additional sites in Bislig, Tagbina, Lianga, Cagwait, San Miguel, and Cantilan. The university provides higher education in the fields of industrial technology, teacher education, agriculture, agribusiness, business administration, forestry, aqua-marine technology, environmental science, engineering, and technology.

== History ==
School seal as Surigao del Sur State University

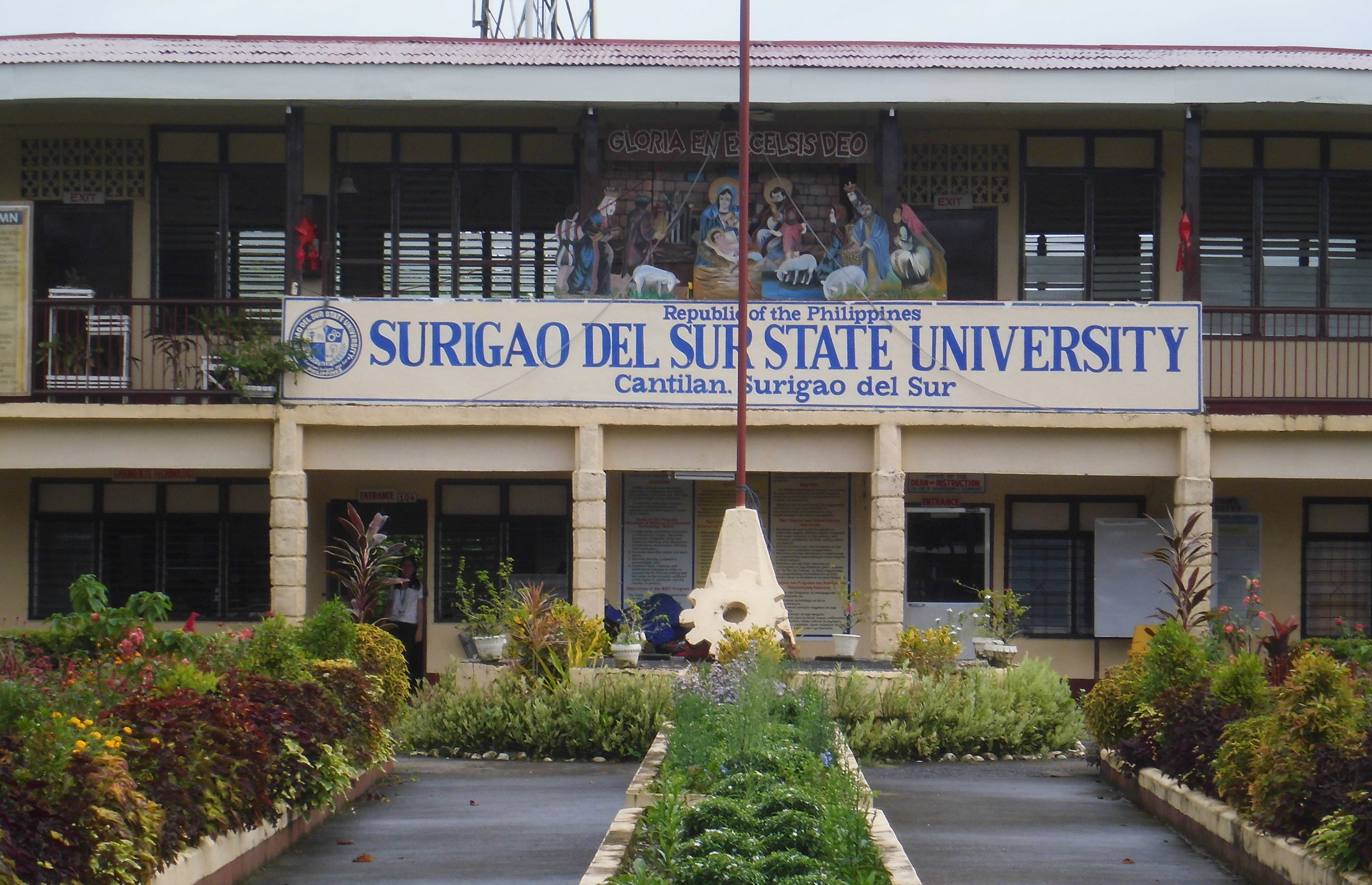
The Surigao del Sur State University campus in Cantilan

The Bukidnon State University, formerly Bukidnon State College (BSC), established the campus within its external studies center at Rosario, Tandag, Surigao del Sur in 1982.

Through the years, the Surigao del Sur Polytechnic College (SSPC) was instituted in 1992 by virtue of Republic Act 7377 approved on April 10, 1992, by President Corazon C. Aquino integrating the BSC External Studies Center in Tandag, Cagwait School of Arts and Trades in Cagwait, Surigao del Sur Institute of Fisheries and Aquaculture in Lianga, Tago River Valley Institute of Agriculture in the shared boundaries of San Miguel and Tago, and Tagbina-Barobo National Agricultural High School in Tagbina.

In 2000, the Surigao del Sur Institute of Technology (SSIT) in Cantilan, Surigao del Sur was integrated with SSPC and the institution was renamed into Surigao del Sur Polytechnic State College (SSPSC).

Republic Act 9998, authored by Rep. Philip Pichay, converted Surigao del Sur Polytechnic State College into Surigao del Sur State University (SdSSU) and was signed by President Gloria Macapagal Arroyo in 2010.

In 2019, the Bislig Campus of the University of Southeastern Philippines was formally turned over to the Surigao del Sur State University making it its seventh campus.

On July 30, 2021, President Rodrigo Duterte has signed the renaming of the university from Surigao del Sur State University to North Eastern Mindanao State University.
