= Mindanao State University at Naawan =

Public university in Misamis Oriental, Philippines

- Pamantansang Mindanao sa Naawan (Filipino)
- Motto: Forging Minds, Better Tomorrow
- Type: Public, State University
- Established: December 4, 1973
- Founder: Domiciano K. Villaluz
- Affiliations: CCT, PCMARD-DOST, ZAT and other unlisted
- Chancellor: Elnor C. Roa, Ph.D.
- President: Atty. Paisalin P.D. Tago,CPA
- Location: Pedro Pagalan St., Brgy. Poblacion, Naawan, Misamis Oriental, Philippines; 8°25′53″N 124°17′40″E
- Campus: Town
- Hymn: Himno ng Pamantasang Mindanao
- Colors: GoldenYellow and MidnightBlue
- Nickname: MSU-Naawan
- Mascot: Sarimanok
- Website: www.msunaawan.edu.ph
- Location in Mindanao Location in the Philippines

Mindanao State University at Naawan is an autonomous external campus and distinct unit of Mindanao State University System based in Naawan, Misamis Oriental, Philippines.

== History ==
Mindanao State University at Naawan was founded as a field laboratory of the MSU College of Fisheries under Dean Domiciano Kapili Villaluz in 1964. This field laboratory was intended to complement the MSU College of Fisheries program in freshwater aquaculture. Through the help of the Municipal government, a 15 hectare mangrove area in Naawan, Misamis Oriental was acquired for training students in the design and construction of brackishwater ponds for the culture of commercially important species of fish. At the same time, a handful of biologists under the leadership of Dean Villaluz was experimenting on the hatchery technique of producing the fry of Penaeus monodon Fabricius under laboratory conditions, the first in the world.

In 1969, Dean D.K. Villaluz successful convinced the National Science Development Board (NSDB) of the bright prospect of prawn culture in the country. This led to the NSDB assistance of P37,000/year for three years to research project entitled "Reproduction, Larval Development and Cultivation of Sugpo, P. monodon Fab. Project." With this assistance, the research team under Dean D.K. Villaluz managed to construct a pilot laboratory. This first documented successful experiment on prawn culture inspired other institutions and private investors in recent years to put up, commercial hatcheries and provided bright prospect for a new dollar-earning aquaculture industry.

In 1971, the Sulu College of Technology and Oceanography was created by Republic Act No. 6060 to develop the fishery potentials of Sulu nearby waters. In line with the objectives of RA 6060, the Institute of Fisheries Research and Development was organized to purposely intensify research on fisheries with MSU-NSDB Marine Fisheries Laboratory at Naawan as its nucleus and research arm on coastal fisheries and with the SCTO Coastal Research Laboratory in Marawi City as its research arms on inland fisheries.

The MSU-Institute of Fisheries Research and Development was formally organized and made a distinct unit of the Mindanao State University pursuant to a special order signed by then President Mauyag Tamano on December 4, 1973 placing the MSU Naawan Fisheries High School under its immediate supervision. At that time, the Institute program had the following main components:

1. Research;
2. Training and Extension;
3. Academic;
4. Conservation

When Director Warlito M. Sanguila reorganized the administrative set-up of the Institute, the top level management of the institute consisted of the Director with three deputy-directors, namely:

- Deputy-Director for Research,
- Deputy-Director for Technology Transfer, and
- Deputy-Director for Administration and Development.

Expansion of the manpower and service coverage of the Institute demanded another reorganization in 1981. The streamlining was patterned closely to the organizational set up of PCARRD. This reorganization plan was submitted to the Board of Regents and approved under BOR resolution No. 285, S. 1981 in its 108th meeting. In May 1980-81 the School of Marine Fisheries and Technology was established. This was a tertiary level joint project of the MSU-College of Fisheries and the MSU-IFRD. The MSU Board of Regents gave its seal of approval to this venture by passing BOR Resolution No. 2190, S. 1980. The School serves as the academic arm of IFRD. SMFT students have access to the laboratory facilities of IFRD and have the institute researchers as instructors. The students of the school are therefore assured not only of a strong theoretical foundation of their tasks, but are also assured of the required expertise in the application of their career in the field of fisheries. This was the assessment of a study team composed of professors from the UP College of Fisheries at Diliman, and of representatives from the Ministry of Education, Culture, and Sports (MECS) when they toured the IFRD Campus in 1985 and 1986. The group recommended that IFRD be designated as the center for Marine Sciences in Mindanao. SMFT is headed by a dean and it offers courses along its specialization; Bachelor of Science in Marine Biology, Bachelor of Science in Fisheries Major in Mariculture, Diploma in Fisheries Technology major in Fish Culture Technology and Fish Processing Technology, and a graduate program in Marine Biology.

By 1981, the Institute was restructured pursuant to BOR Resolution 285 Series of 1981. In 1982 Naawan Fisheries High School was integrated with the Institute pursuant to BOR Resolution 174, Series of 1982. In 1988 MSU Naawan was formally organized as a distinct autonomous unit of the MSU System pursuant to Memorandum Orders No. 3 and no. 45 and BOR resolution 92, Series of 1988.

On July 21, 1988, the first Executive Director for the Naawan campus was elected by the Board of Regents of the University. By August 6, after two weeks of dialogic consultations with the campus constituents, the Executive Director completed the revamp of the second and lower level leadership positions of the campus in accordance with its BOR approved new-organizational structure. This was immediately followed by reorientation meetings with the new set of officials where the objectives of the university and the programs to be specifically pursued and charted with mandated objectives towards, research, extension, and instruction.

== Present MSU – Naawan ==
Today, since the founding of the MSU College of Fisheries and as a distinct unit of the MSU System, MSU Naawan holds the distinction as one of the campus that has gained both national and international prominence in fisheries research. Last January 2016, MSU Naawan received its first Center of Excellence Award in Fisheries and second Center of Development Award for Marine Science pursuant to CHED Memorandum Order no. 38 series of 2015. The Campus also counts the prestigious Earth Day Award from DENR and the Centennial Fisheries Award from DOST and the numerous awards received by its researchers as indicators of the level of excellence it has attained over the years of existence. At present, it caters to the research needs of Region 10, 12, and 13 in the fields of fisheries. It enjoys the support of other government agencies in the implementation of its programs and projects.
