= Mindanao State University–Sulu =

Public university in Sulu, Philippines

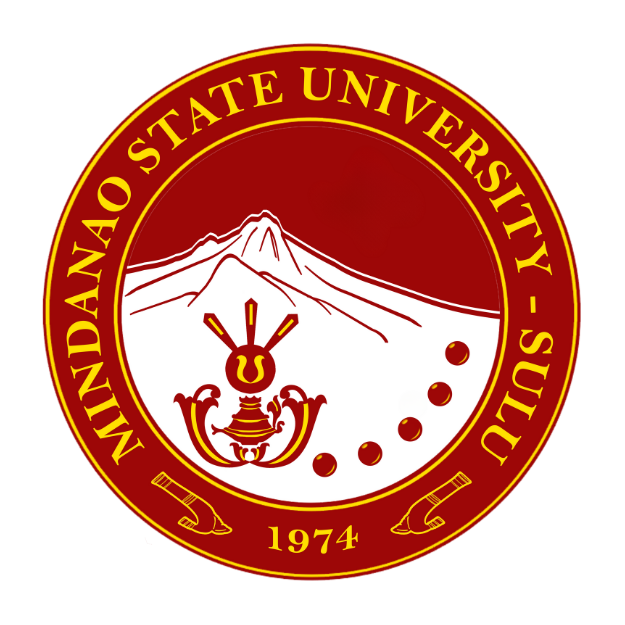
- Former names: Sulu Development and Technical College (SDTC)
- Type: Public, State university
- Established: 1974
- Affiliations: ASAIHL
- Chancellor: Nagder J. Abdurahman, Ed.D.
- President: Dr. Rasid M. Paca (OIC)
- Location: Jolo, Sulu, 7400, Philippines; 6°02′50″N 121°00′55″E
- Campus: 11.5 ha (28 acres)
- Hymn: Himno ng Pamantasang Mindanao
- Colors: Maroon and Gold
- Mascot: Sarimanok
- Website: Official website
- Location in Mindanao Location in the Philippines

Mindanao State University–Sulu (commonly referred to as MSU Sulu) is a public coeducational institution of higher education and research located in the municipality of Jolo, Sulu, Philippines. It was founded in 1974 by Mindanao State University Board of Regents through Resolution No. 860, Series of 1974.

== History ==
Mindanao State University (MSU) Sulu was formerly known as MSU-Sulu Development and Technical College (SDTC). The campus was founded by the government to rehabilitate the educational situation of the province of Sulu in 1974.

Upon founding, the school temporarily held classes at the grandstand of the Elementary School with its office at the residence of then Commission on Election (COMELEC) commissioner Hashim R. Abubakar. Out of necessity, founding Director Exuan T. Dagbusan appealed and asked the intercession of the provincial officials and subsequently, the Sulu Provincial Board passed Resolution No. 64, Series 1974 donating 11.5 hectares lot for the decent occupancy of MSU-SDTC. The present campus site is about 1.3 kilometers from Jolo town proper.

== Academic units ==
Currently, the university has eleven (11) academic units.

- College of Agriculture - Dean Merhama M. Sammah
- College of Arts and Sciences - Dean Ajid M. Sari, MAED
- College of Business Administration - Dean Jurhaida Javier, MBA
- College of Computer Studies - Dean Nureeza J. Latorre, Ph.D.
- College of Education - Dean Abdel Ajim M. Salasain, Ph.D.
- College of Fisheries - Dean Ronaldo A. Ancheta
- College of Health Sciences - Dean Nursidar P. Mukattil, MAN
- College of Public Affairs - Dean Jul-asiri A. Hadjibun, Ed.D., DPA
- Senior High School - Director Norman A. Abdurahman, Ed.D., DPA
- Laboratory High School - Principal Julhajan Julhan, MAEd
- MSU College of Law - Sulu Extension Campus - Asst. Dean Atty. Meltino J. Sibulan
