= Mindanao State University–Tawi-Tawi College of Technology and Oceanography =

Public university in Bongao, Tawi-Tawi, Philippines

Mindanao State University Tawi-Tawi College of Technology and Oceanography
- Kolehiyo ng Teknolohiya at Oceanograpiya ng Tawi-Tawi (Filipino)
- Former names: Mindanao State University Preparatory High School Bongao (1964–1969); Sulu College of Technology and Oceanography (1969–1982)
- Established: 1964
- Location: Bongao, Tawi-Tawi, Philippines; 5°02′20″N 119°44′40″E
- Website: msutcto.edu.ph
- Location in Mindanao Location in the Philippines

The Mindanao State University – Tawi-Tawi College of Technology and Oceanography (MSU-TCTO) is a public university located in Sanga-Sanga, Bongao, in the province of Tawi-Tawi, Philippines, serving as an autonomous campus of the Mindanao State University System.

== History ==
Starting in 1964 as Mindanao State University Preparatory High School in Bongao, Tawi-Tawi (a mere adjunct of MSU Marawi Preparatory High School), MSU Tawi-Tawi College of Technology and Oceanography has grown into an institution of academic excellence. More secondary schools were established from 1967 to 1977 in the outlying island municipalities of Tawi-Tawi. By 1990, 20 high schools had been established throughout the province. In 1984, MSU-TCTO Science High School and MSU-TCTO Child Development Center – Laboratory Elementary School were established.

Republic Act No. 6060, signed by President Ferdinand Marcos, established the MSU-Sulu College of Technology and Oceanography on August 4, 1969, initially offering degree programs and a diploma in Fisheries Technology.

On March 16, 1982, Batas Pambansa Blg. 197 was signed into law, changing the name of Sulu College of Technology and Oceanography to Tawi-Tawi College of Technology and Oceanography. It became part of the Mindanao State University System as an autonomous campus.
