= Sulu State University =

Public university in Sulu, Philippines

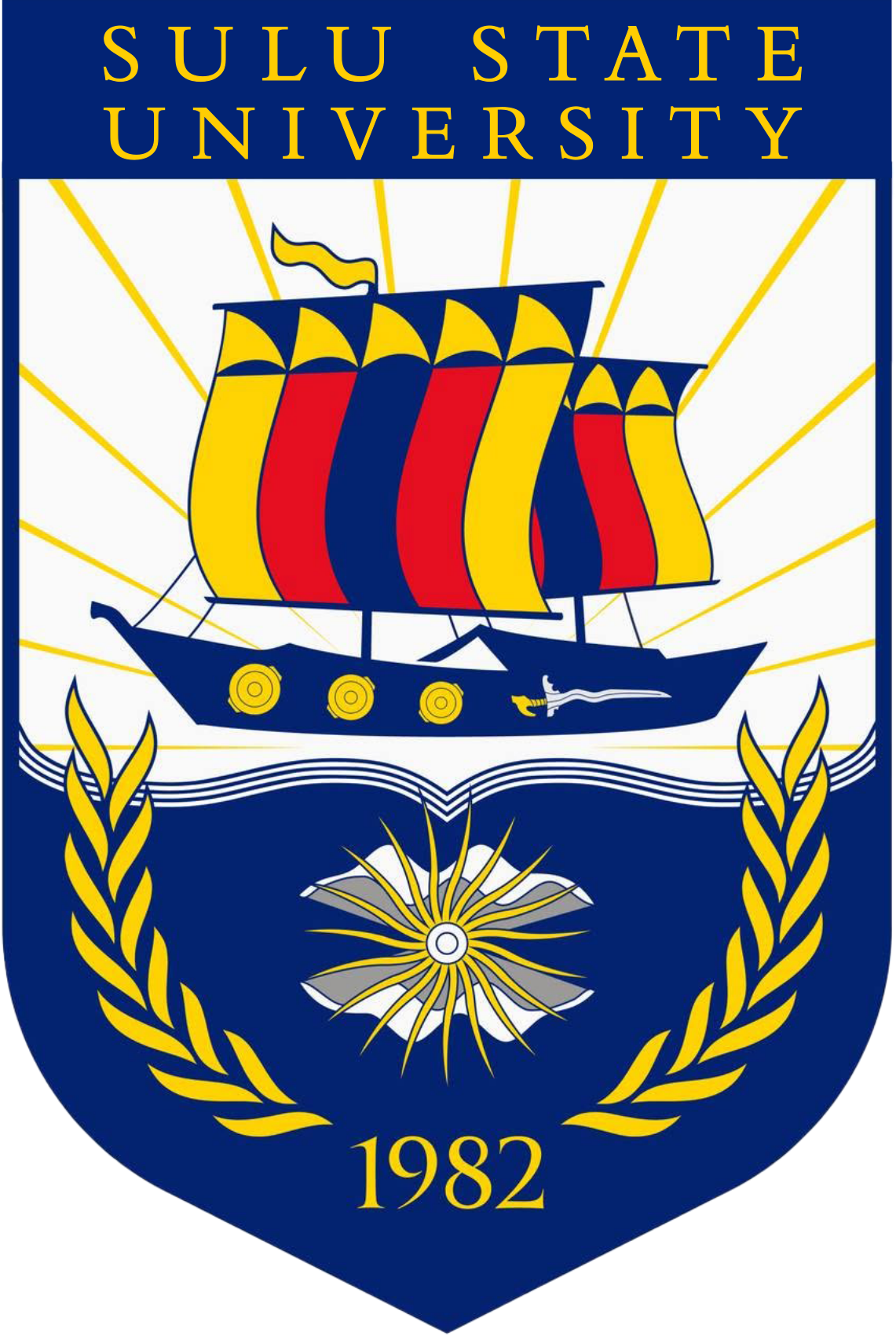
- Type: State university
- Established: 1924 (as high school); 1982 (as state college); 2025 (as state university)
- President: Charisma Ututalum
- Location: Jolo, Sulu, Philippines; 6°3′3″N 121°0′46″E
- Sporting affiliations: PASUC
- Website: www.sulusu.edu.ph
- Location in Mindanao Location in the Philippines

Sulu State University is a public university in Jolo, Sulu, Philippines. It is mandated to provide higher technological, professional, and vocational instruction and training in science, agricultural and industrial fields, as well as short-term technical or vocational courses.

== History ==
It was established by the Americans in 1924 as Sulu High School and was then the highest institution of learning in Sulu.

Sulu High School was renamed Dayang Hadji Piandao Memorial High School in 1963 to posthumously honor Dayang Dayang Piandao, pursuant to Republic Act No. 3712.

The Dayang Hadji Piandao Memorial High School was merged with the Jolo Community College in 1982, pursuant to Batas Pambansa Blg. 208. The unified institution became known as the Sulu State College.

In 2025, the college was upgraded to become the Sulu State University following the passage of Republic Act No. 12296 or the Sulu State University Charter, which lapsed into law without President Bongbong Marcos' signature on September 15.
