= Cotabato Foundation College of Science and Technology =

Public college in Cotabato, Philippines

- Type: State college
- Established: 1967
- Endowment: PHP 61,729,000.00
- President: Dr. Ali K. Dilangalen
- Location: Arakan, Cotabato, Philippines; 7°20′48″N 125°05′38″E
- Campus: Arakan, Cotabato (Main Campus) Kidapawan; Pikit; and Antipas (Satellite Campuses)
- Website: www.cfcst.edu.ph
- Location in Mindanao Location in the Philippines

The Cotabato Foundation College of Science and Technology (CFCST) is located in Barangay Doroluman, Arakan, Cotabato. CFCST is commonly known as Foundation College being born from the orphanage school, the then Children's Educational Foundation Village (CEFV).
