= Leyte Normal University =

Public university in Leyte, Philippines

- Pamantasang Normal ng Leyte (Filipino)
- Former names: Leyte Provincial Normal School (1921–1952); Leyte Normal School (1952–1976); Leyte State College (1976–1995)
- Motto in English: Integrity. Excellence. Service.
- Type: State university
- Established: 1921
- President: Gil Nicetas B. Villarino
- Vice-president: Lina G. Fabian (VP for Academic Services); Solomon D. Faller, Jr. (VP for Administration & Finance); Jonas P. Villas (VP for Research, Internationalization & Extension); Joyce M. Magtolis (VP for Student Development)
- Students: 7,727
- Location: Tacloban City, Philippines; 11°14′16″N 125°00′05″E
- Campus: Tacloban City
- Newspaper: An Lantawan
- Colors: Blue and gold
- Nickname: LNU
- Website: www.lnu.edu.ph
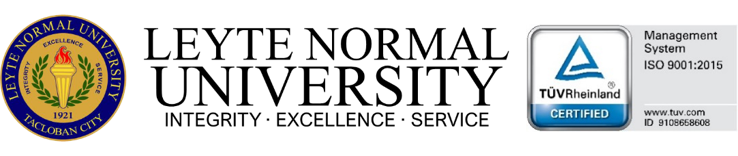

- Location in the Visayas Location in the Philippines

Leyte Normal University (also abbreviated as LNU) is a university in the province of Leyte, Philippines. It is mandated to provide higher professional and special instruction for special purposes and to promote research and extension services, advanced studies, and progressive leadership in education and other related fields. Its campus is situated in Tacloban City.

== Officials ==
(As of July 2025)

President	Gil Nicetas B. Villarino
Vice Presidents	Name
Academic Services	Lina G. Fabian
Administration and Finance	Solomon D. Faller, Jr.
Research, Internationalization, and Extension	Jonas P. Villas
Student Development	Joyce M. Magtolis

Deans	Name
College of Education	Billy A. Danday
College of Arts and Sciences	Rommel L. Verecio
College of Management and Entrepreneurship	Evangeline D. Sanchez
Graduate School	Cleofe L. Lajara
