= Mindanao State University–Maguindanao =

Public university in Maguindanao del Norte, Philippines

Mindanao State University-Maguindanao
- Former names: Mindanao State University - Dinaig Agricultural and Technical College (MSU-DATC)
- Type: Public, State University
- Established: October 10, 1973
- Chancellor: Dr. Bai Hejira Nefertiti Sinsuat-Macalandong Limbona
- President: Dr. Rasid M. Paca (OIC)
- Location: Dalican (Main Campus); Tamontaka (Graduate Studies), Datu Odin Sinsuat, Maguindanao del Norte, Philippines; 7°00′53″N 124°19′20″E
- Hymn: Himno ng Pamantasang Mindanao
- Colors: Maroon and Gold
- Nickname: Trailblazers
- Website: www.msumaguindanao.edu.ph
- Location in Mindanao Location in the Philippines

Mindanao State University-Maguindanao (commonly referred to as MSU-Maguindanao) is a public institution of higher education located in Barangay Dalican, in the municipality of Datu Odin Sinsuat, Maguindanao del Norte, Philippines. It was established on October 10, 1973, by Mindanao State University Board of Regents (BOR) through Resolution No. 821 series of 1973. The university is nicknamed Trailblazers.

== History ==
Mindanao State University-Maguindanao was originally known as MSU Dinaig Agricultural and Technical College (MSU-DATC). "Dinaig" was the former name of Datu Odin Sinsuat until it was renamed in 1994 by virtue of Muslim Mindanao Autonomy Act No. 29 during the Second Assembly.

The campus began its operations in 1973 with 7 faculty members, 15 administrative personnel, and an initial enrollment of 126 students. In its early years, the university offered only three courses: Agriculture, Forestry, and Community Development. Initially, classes were conducted at the grandstand of Dalican (Poblacion) Pilot Elementary School. However, in 1975, all the school facilities were destroyed in a fire. Following this event, the then mayor of Dinaig, Datu Odin Sinsuat, donated and sold a portion of his 55-hectare property, which now serves as the university's current campus.

MSU-Maguindanao was granted fiscal autonomy by virtue of BOR Resolution no. 48 in 1982. It was later renamed to its current name by virtue of BOR Resolution No. 561, series of 1982.

== Academic units ==
Undergraduate and graduate programs

The university currently offers 19 baccalaureate programs, nine graduate programs, and two diploma courses, organized under seven academic units.

- Graduate Studies
- College of Agriculture
- College of Arts and Sciences
- College of College of Public Affairs and Governance
- College of Education
- College of Fisheries
- College of Forestry and Environmental Studies

Secondary education

MSU-Maguindanao also houses a secondary school known as the Integrated Laboratory Science High School (ILSHS), which operates under the College of Education. The school provides education for both Junior High School (Grades 7-10) and Senior High School (Grades 11-12) levels. The Senior High School only offers Science, Technology, Engineering, and Mathematics (STEM).
