= Mindanao State University–General Santos =

Public university in General Santos City, Philippines

Mindanao State University General Santos
- Pamantasang Mindanao ng Lungsod ng Heneral Santos (Filipino)
- Motto: Learn, Achieve, Excel
- Type: Public, research non-profit co-educational state higher education institution
- Established: September 1967; 58 years ago (as community high school); October 10, 1973; 52 years ago (as constituent campus)
- Chancellor: Shidik T. Abantas
- President: Paisalin P. Tago
- Students: 9,548+
- Undergraduates: 8,651
- Location: Fatima, General Santos, Philippines; 6°03′59″N 125°07′34″E
- Campus: Multiple sites Fatima: 156 hectares (390 acres) Dadiangas: 3.3 hectares (8.2 acres) Siguel: 3.1 hectares (7.7 acres)
- Alma Mater song: Himno ng Pamantasang Mindanao
- Colors: Maroon and Gold
- Website: www.msugensan.edu.ph
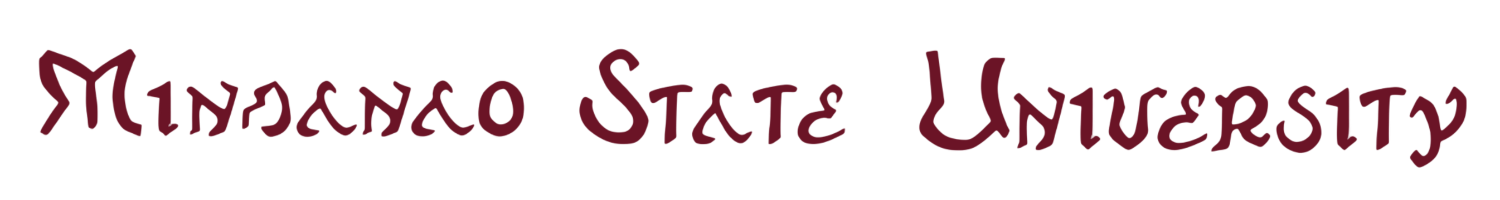

Mindanao State University – General Santos (MSU Gensan; Filipino: Pamantasang Mindanao ng Lungsod ng Heneral Santos) is a state university located in General Santos City, Philippines. It was created in September 1967, six years after the establishment of the Mindanao State University in Marawi in 1961. It became a constituent campus of the Mindanao State University System on October 10, 1973. It is one of the state universities of the Philippines with the aim of providing education for the different strategic locations across the island of Mindanao.

As a member of the Mindanao State University System, it has a special mandate of integrating the cultural communities in Mindanao into the mainstream of the nation's socio-cultural and political life by providing them with opportunities for quality and relevant public education for their self-development and providing trained manpower skills and technical know-how for the economic development of the region.

Its 156-hectare main campus is located in Barangay Fatima, where most of its academic colleges, institutional facilities and administrative offices are located. The main campus is also the site of a seismic station of the Philippine Institute of Volcanology and Seismology. In addition, MSU-Gensan maintains a campus in the city center, where the university's College of Medicine, School of Graduate Studies, College of Law (extension of the main campus), and laboratory high school is located. The College of Fisheries and Aquatic Sciences has a dedicated laboratory and research station at Barangay Siguel.

== History ==
Mindanao State University-General Santos was first established as a community high school in 1967. It grew into a junior college in 1971, but was then just limited to a two-year collegiate general education program.

Demand from the students and community for the offering of complete degree programs prompted the Board of Regents to study the potential of the college for academic expansion especially when the "feeder" concept was challenged. On October 10, 1973, MSU Community College became a full-fledged unit and integral part of the Mindanao State University System by virtue of BOR Resolution No. 822.

The campus underwent series of transfers as part of its continuing growth and expansion. As a Community High School, it was a "squatter" at an area inside the Dadiangas West Elementary School campus. Engr. Abedin Limpao Osop, the first Chancellor (who was then the Director) of the campus was able to acquire a 3.3-hectare (8.2-acre) lot as a donation from city government. It gave the impetus for the offering of various college degree programs.

In 1983, the university acquired 156 hectares of land in Barangay Tambler (now Barangay Fatima) through Presidential Proclamation 2029. University officials and students rushed to the site and fenced it with barbed wires. Over time, many academic buildings were built and it became the main campus.

The university became a member of the Accrediting Agency of Chartered Colleges and Universities in the Philippines (AACCUP) on December 31, 2014.

In June 2026, the university was damaged during the 2026 Mindanao earthquake. University officials later requested national government assistance for rehabilitation efforts.

== Academics ==
Mindanao State University-General Santos comprises ten colleges: the College of Agriculture, College of Business Administration and Accountancy, College of Education, College of Engineering, College of Fisheries and Aquatic Sciences, College of Natural Sciences and Mathematics, College of Social Sciences and Humanities, Institute of Islamic, Arabic, and International Studies, College of Health Sciences, College of Law (extension of MSU Marawi), and the College of Medicine.

The university also has a Senior High School department, and offers junior high school through a laboratory high school under the College of Education Training Department.

Recently, the Commission on Higher Education recognized the university as a Center of Excellence in Fisheries; as Provincial Institute for Agriculture; and as Center of Training in Education.

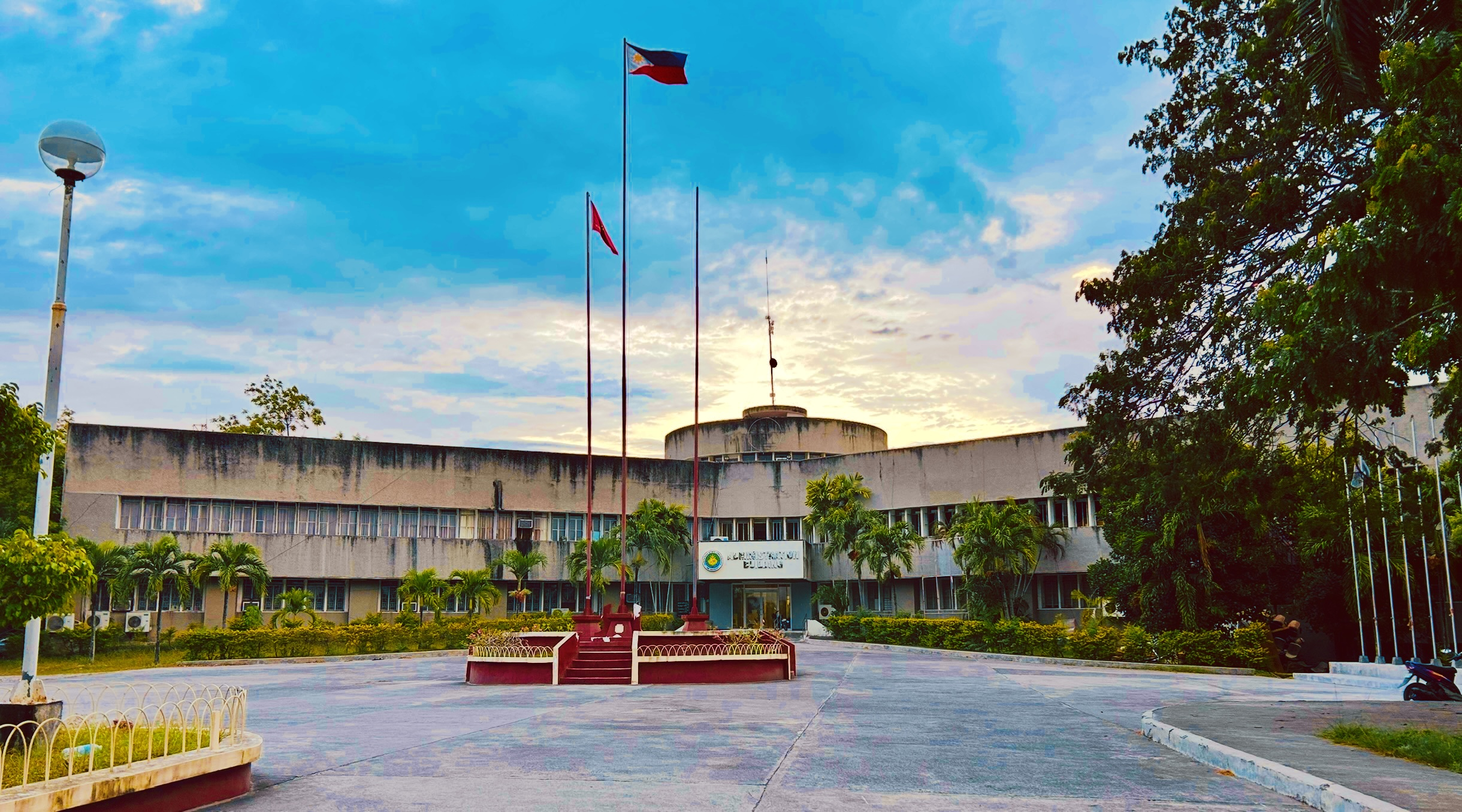
The Administration Building (Y Building) in 2025.

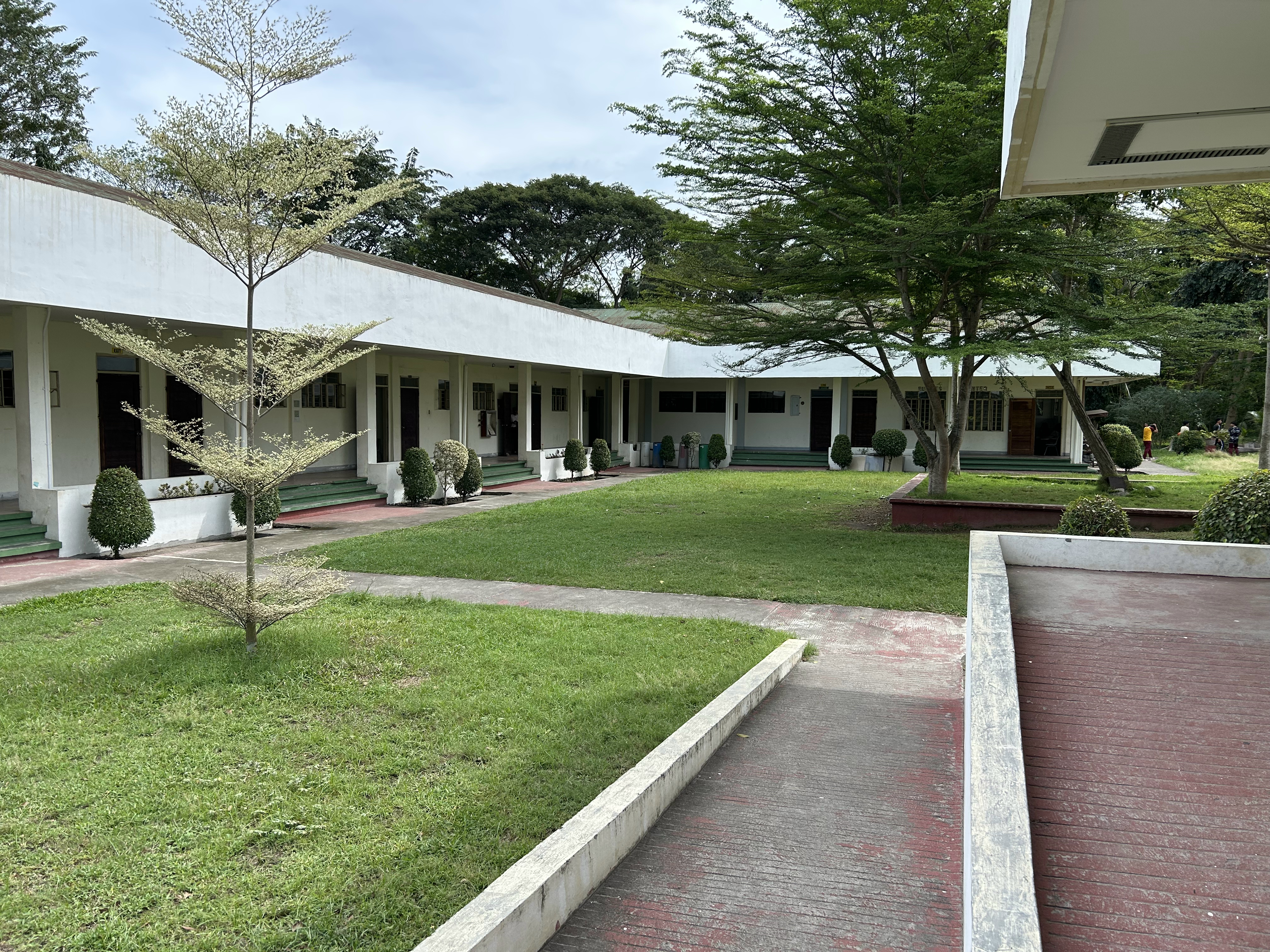
College of Business Administration and Accountancy

== Admission ==
All freshmen applicants should take and pass the Mindanao State University System Admission and Scholarship Examination (SASE).

== Notable alumni ==
- Melisa Cantiveros – Actress and comedian
