= Mindanao State University =

Public university in Marawi City, Philippines

- Pamantasang Pampamahalaan ng Mindanao (Filipino)
- Motto: One MSU aspires to achieve one goal for Academic Excellence
- Type: Public, research, state higher education institution
- Established: September 1, 1961; 65 years ago
- Budget: ₱10.11 billion (2025)
- Chairperson: Shirley Agrupis
- President: Paisalin P. Tago
- Faculty: 3,100
- Students: 69,000
- Location: Marawi City, Philippines (Main Campus); 7°59′56″N 124°15′31″E
- Alma Mater song: Himno ng Pamantasang Mindanao (Mindanao State University Hymn)
- Colors: Maroon and Gold
- Nickname: Royals
- Mascot: Sarimanok
- Website: www.msumain.edu.ph
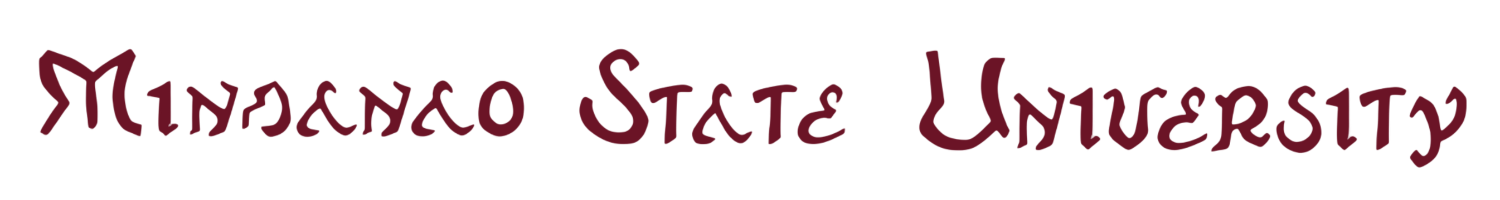

Himno ng Pamantasang Mindanao
- Choral version of MSU Hymn Composed by Lucio San Pedro, Lyrics by Angelito Flores, Arranged by Ernesto "Bajo" Zaldua, Jr., and Performed by the Mindanao State University–Iligan Institute of Technology The Octava Choral Society: file; help

Mindanao State University (MSU; Filipino: Pamantasang Pampamahalaan ng Mindanao) is a state public university system in the Philippines, primarily serving the regions of Mindanao, Sulu, and Palawan (MINSUPALA). Established through Republic Act No. 1387, as amended by R.A. 1893, it is the first state university in the island of Mindanao and the second state-sponsored institution in the country, following the University of the Philippines System.

Mindanao State University was formally established on September 1, 1961 in Marawi City, the capital of Lanao del Sur, which was claimed to be the heart of Morolandia due to the city being the site of the reference point of all roads in Mindanao. The university was formally established with the first meeting of its Board of Regents in Marawi on August 19, 1961, that resulted into the election of the first president of the University in the person of Antonio Isidro, the then Vice President for Academic Affairs of the University of the Philippines System.

The Mindanao State University System has 8 constituent universities and 3 constituent colleges: MSU-Marawi, which serves as the system's main campus and is also referred to as MSU-Main, MSU-Iligan Institute of Technology, MSU-General Santos, MSU-Tawi Tawi College of Technology and Oceanography, MSU-Maguindanao, MSU at Naawan, MSU-Sulu, MSU-Zamboanga Sibugay, MSU-Lanao National College of Arts and Trades, MSU-Maigo College of Education, Science and Technology, and MSU-Lanao del Norte Agricultural College.

== History ==
Mindanao State University (MSU) was established on September 1, 1961, through RA 1387, as amended. It was the brainchild of the late Senator Domocao Alonto, as one of the government's responses to the so-called "Mindanao Problem".

The original mission of the university was anchored on instruction, research, and extension. The 1954 Congressional Committee conceptualized it as a social laboratory for national integration.

The main campus in Marawi, which started with 282 students and 12 faculty members in its pioneering classes in 1962, has now grown to a multi-campus supra-regional university system, serving over 69,000 students in all levels with nearly 3,100 faculty members.

It is the only university directly charged by the government to advance the cause of national unity and actively pursue integration through education.

Today, MSU has units in areas which cut across the Mindanao regions. From a one campus university in Marawi, MSU has grown to a multi-campus system of eight autonomous universities: MSU-Main in Marawi, MSU-IIT in Iligan, MSU-TCTO in Tawi-Tawi, MSU at Naawan in Misamis Oriental, MSU-Maguindanao in Datu Odin Sinsuat, MSU-General Santos, MSU-Sulu in Jolo, and MSU-Zamboanga Sibugay in Buug.

The mandates of the university are:

- To perform the traditional functions of a university namely: instruction, research and extension service.
- To help accelerate the program of the integration among the peoples of the Southern Philippines, particularly the Muslims and other cultural minorities.
- To provide trained manpower skills and technical know-how for the economic development of the Mindanao, Sulu and Palawan (MINSUPALA) region in Bangsamoro.

The initial batch of students to enroll in the University on June 13, 1962, passed the scholarship examination administered by the National Science Development Board. The 282 freshmen students were in the top 5% of their high schools in the MINSUPALA region in Bangsamoro. Their teachers were 12 regular Filipino faculty members and a number of volunteers from the U.S. Peace Corps, British Voluntary Service Overseas, Volunteers in Asia, Ford Foundation, Fulbright Foundation and others. Baccalaureate courses were offered by the pioneering colleges: Liberal Arts, Education and Community Development to which four more were added in the subsequent school year 1964–65 – Agriculture, Fisheries, Business Administration and Engineering. In July 1969, the College of Forestry was added.

To meet the growing demands of the region, 16 major colleges were created offering 248 courses.

On January 10, 2001, three CHED supervised institutions — Lanao del Norte Agricultural College (LNAC), Lanao National College of Arts and Trades (LNCAT), and Maigo School of Arts and Trades (MSAT) — were integrated into the MSU System by virtue of CHED Order No. 27 S. 2000 and Republic Act No. 8760.

Classes were temporarily suspended due to the Battle of Marawi, which started in May 2017. Some students, faculty, and personnel were evacuated to nearby MSU-IIT in Iligan while others went home to their provinces during the ongoing conflict. The school was unable to hold summer classes in the campus. However, regular in-campus classes resumed in August of the same year after a successful Balik MSU: Somombak Tano sa Pantaw a Mareg campaign to allow faculty and students to return to the campus amidst the ongoing war with security being strictly monitored. The battle in the city officially ended later in October.

On December 3, 2023, a bombing occurred in Dimaporo Gymnasium during a Catholic mass. Four people were confirmed dead and at least 40 people were injured. Classes were temporarily suspended and students, faculty, and personnel were repatriated to their home provinces following the incident. The Islamic State claimed responsibility for the attack.

== Administration ==
=== President of Mindanao State University ===
The President of Mindanao State University is the chief executive officer of the Mindanao State University System, and is appointed for a six-year term by the President of the Philippines.

Since its founding in 1961, Mindanao State University has had 7 regular presidents, and 8 who served in an interim capacity. The longest-serving president was Mohamad Ali Dimaporo, who led the university in an acting capacity from 1976 to 1986 while concurrently serving as Governor of Lanao del Sur.

Atty. Paisalin P. Tago, a member of the Bangsamoro Parliament, currently serves as President of the MSU System after being appointed by President Bongbong Marcos on June 27, 2025.

Presidents of the Mindanao State University System
No.	President	Term
1	Antonio Isidro	1962–1969
	Alfredo Q. Primero	1969–1970
2	Mauyag M. Tamano	1970–1975
	Tocod Macaraya Sr.	1974–1975
	Mohamad Ali M. Dimaporo	1976–1986
	Mangingin D. Magomnang	1986
3	Ahmad E. Alonto Jr.	1987–1992
4	Hadja Sittie Nurlalylah Emily M. Marohombsar	1993–1999
	Diamael M. Lucman	1999
5	Camar A. Umpa	1999–2005
	Ricardo F. De Leon	2005
	Macapado A. Muslim	2008–2010
6	Macapado A. Muslim	2010-2016
7	Habib W. Macaayong	2016–2022
8	Basari D. Mapupuno	2022–2025
	Rasid M. Paca	2025
9	Paisalin P. Tago	2025–present

– served as regent-in-charge
– served as officer-in-charge
– served as Acting President

=== Board of Regents of Mindanao State University ===
The Board of Regents is the highest governing body of the Mindanao State University System.

== Autonomous units ==
The Mindanao State University System is currently composed of eight constituent universities and three constituent colleges located around Mindanao, Sulu, and Palawan (MINSUPALA).

The campus in Marawi serves as the main campus of the university and is also referred to as MSU-Main. Constituent universities are headed by a chancellor, who is elected for a five-year term.

Constituent universities of the Mindanao State University System
Constituent university	Location	Chancellor	Campus land area
Mindanao State University - General Santos	General Santos	Atty. Shidik T. Abantas	156 hectares (390 acres)
Mindanao State University - Iligan Institute of Technology	Iligan City	Prof. Alizedney M. Ditucalan	9 hectares (22 acres)
Mindanao State University - Maguindanao	Datu Odin Sinsuat, Maguindanao del Norte	Dr. Bai Hejira Nefertiti M. Limbona	55 hectares (140 acres)
Mindanao State University (Note: The main campus of the Mindanao State University System. Also referred to as MSU Main.)	Marawi City	Atty. Paisalin P. Tago (Note: The President of the Mindanao State University System serves as the Chancellor of the main campus in Marawi.)	1,000 hectares (2,500 acres)
Mindanao State University at Naawan	Naawan, Misamis Oriental	Dr. Elnor C. Roa, RChE	
Mindanao State University - Sulu	Jolo, Sulu	Dr. Nagder J. Abdurahman	
Mindanao State University - Tawi-Tawi College of Technology and Oceanography	Bongao, Tawi-Tawi	Dr. Mary Joyce Z. Guinto-Sali	
Mindanao State University - Zamboanga Sibugay	Buug, Zamboanga Sibugay	Dr. Sheila G. Magolama	6 hectares (15 acres)

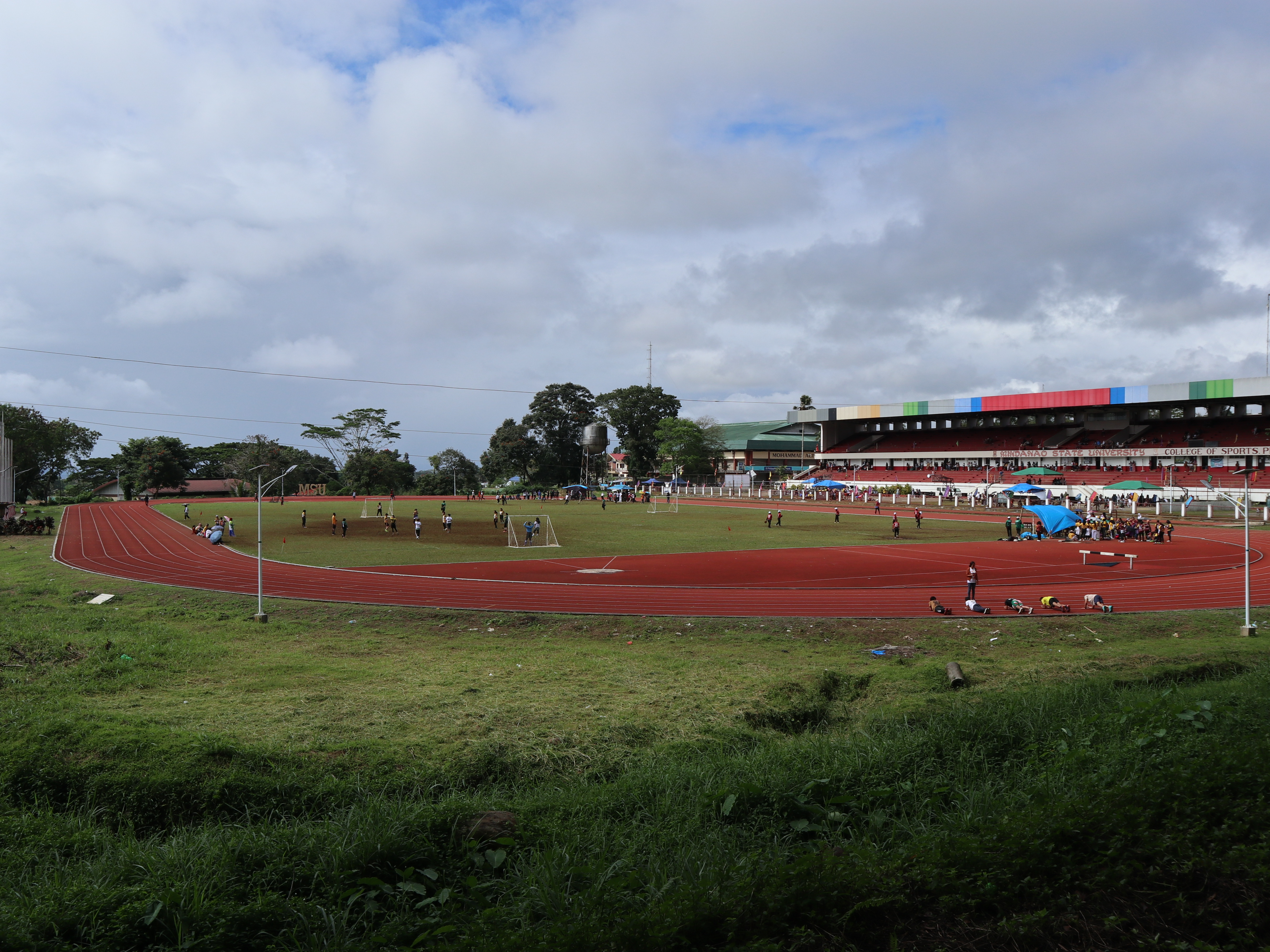
Mindanao State University Sports Complex

The University Library

Colleges

- College of Agriculture (COA)
- College of Business Administration and Accountancy (CBAA)
- College of Education (CED)
- College of Engineering (COE)
- College of Fisheries and Aquatic Sciences (CFAS)
- College of Forestry and Environmental Studies (CFES)
- College of Health Sciences (CHS)
- College of Hospitality and Tourism Management (CHTM)
- College of Information and Computing Sciences (CICS)
- College of Law (COL): It has two extensions in Iligan and General Santos. In 2025, the college was ordered closed by the Legal Education Board after it revoked its accreditation. However, the college remains open pending an appeal in the Supreme Court.
- College of Medicine (COM) — in Iligan
- College of Natural Sciences and Mathematics (CNSM)
- College of Public Affairs (CPA)
- College of Social Sciences and Humanities (CSSH)
- College of Sports, Physical Education and Recreation (CSPEAR)
- King Faisal Center for Islamic, Arabic and Asian Studies (KFCIAAS)
- Graduate Studies (GS)

High Schools

- MSU - Institute of Science Education - Science High School (MSU-ISED-SciHS)
- MSU - Integrated Laboratory School (MSU-ILS)
- MSU - University Training Center (MSU-UTC)
- MSU - Marawi Senior High School (MSU-MSHS)

High Schools (External Units) managed by the Office of the Assistant Vice Chancellor for Academic Affairs

• MSU - Balindong Community High School

• MSU - Balo-i Community High School

• MSU - Binidayan Community High School

• MSU - Lopez Jaena Community High School

• MSU - Malabang Community High School

• MSU - Marantao Community High School

• MSU - Masiu Community High School

• MSU - Tamparan Community High School

• MSU - Taraka Community High School

• MSU - Tugaya Community High School

• MSU - Saguiaran Community High School

• MSU - Siawadato Community High School

• MSU - Wao Community High School

=== Autonomous universities and semi-autonomous colleges ===
Bangsamoro Autonomous Region in Muslim Mindanao (BARMM)

1. Mindanao State University (Main Campus)
  1. Mindanao State University Main Campus – Sindangan Extension
  2. Mindanao State University Main Campus – Bataraza Extension (the first MSU campus outside Mindanao, located in Bataraza, Palawan)
  3. Mindanao State University – Al-Barka Basilan Extension
2. Mindanao State University – Maguindanao
3. Mindanao State University – Lanao National College of Arts and Trades
4. Mindanao State University – Tawi-Tawi College of Technology and Oceanography
  (formerly Sulu College of Technology and Oceanography in Bongao, Tawi-Tawi which was created by RA no. 6060)

Zamboanga Peninsula (Region IX)

1. Mindanao State University – Zamboanga Sibugay
2. Mindanao State University – Sulu

Northern Mindanao (Region X)

1. Mindanao State University at Naawan
2. Mindanao State University – Iligan Institute of Technology
3. Mindanao State University – Sultan Naga Dimaporo
4. Mindanao State University – Maigo College of Education, Science, and Technology

SOCCSKSARGEN (Region XII)

1. Mindanao State University – General Santos City
