= Zamboanga State College of Marine Sciences and Technology =

Public college in Zamboanga del Sur, Philippines

- Former name: Philippine Institute of Fisheries Technology
- Type: Public, State higher education institution
- Established: 1956
- President: Roy Lim Valesco, Ph.D.
- Location: Brgy. Rio Hondo, Zamboanga City, Philippines; 6°54′01″N 122°05′00″E
- Hymn: ZSCMST hymn
- Colors: White
- Website: www.zscmst.edu.ph
- Location in Mindanao Location in the Philippines

Zamboanga State College of Marine Sciences and Technology (ZSCMST) is a state college in Zamboanga City, Philippines. It is the sole institution in Western Mindanao offering marine studies and fisheries courses. It is situated in the heart of Zamboanga City, adjacent to the Fort Pilar shrine.

== History ==
The college was established in 1956 as the Southern Mindanao branch of the Philippine Institute of Fisheries Technology (PIFT), the predecessor of the U.P. in the Visayas - College of Fisheries.

In 1965, the SMSF became the first fishery school under the Department of Education to attain college status by virtue of R.A. No. 3434 and was renamed Mindanao Regional School of Fisheries (MRSF).

In 1980, the MRSF was included as one of the eight project institutes of the Sixth Education Project of the Philippine government that were developed into Regional Institutes of Fisheries Technology (RIFTs) through a US$38 million loan package from the World Bank.

In 1986, the college was granted its charter and the mandate to develop and implement courses in fisheries, maritime technology, marine sciences, development management, food technology and computer science with the issuance of P.D. No. 2020 converting the then MRSF-RIFT into the Zamboanga State College of Marine Sciences and Technology (ZSCMST).

=== Recent years ===
From 1995 to 2003 the ZSCMST served as the lead agency of the Southern Mindanao Aquatic Resources Research and Development Zonal Network. As such, it assisted the Philippine Council for Aquatic and Marine Research and Development in managing and monitoring the aquatic resources research and development programs and projects of the networks 10 member institutions. ZSCMST over the years is known for its good track record on fisheries program and marine sciences thus recognized as a Center of Excellence in Fisheries granted by the Commission on Higher Education (CHED).

Along with the University of the Philippines in the Visayas and the University of the Philippines Marine Science Institute, the ZSCMST was chosen by the Department of Agriculture - Bureau of Agricultural Research as a lead agency for the National Research and Development Network for Capture Fisheries. It has served as a zonal center for fisheries and marine biodiversity of the Mindanao Advanced Education Project of the CHED.

== Media ==
ZSCMST has its own radio station, 106.7 Marino News FM (DXCP), DXCP is also affiliated by Presidential Broadcast Service. It is a 10 kilowatts FM broadcast station serving the city of Zamboanga and nearby province of Basilan.

In December 2023, Marino News FM shut down its terrestrial operations temporarily due to upgrading of equipment and maintenance activities. However, it is still active on Facebook and on Zeno.fm.
