= Tawi-Tawi Regional Agricultural College =

Public college in Tawi-Tawi, Philippines

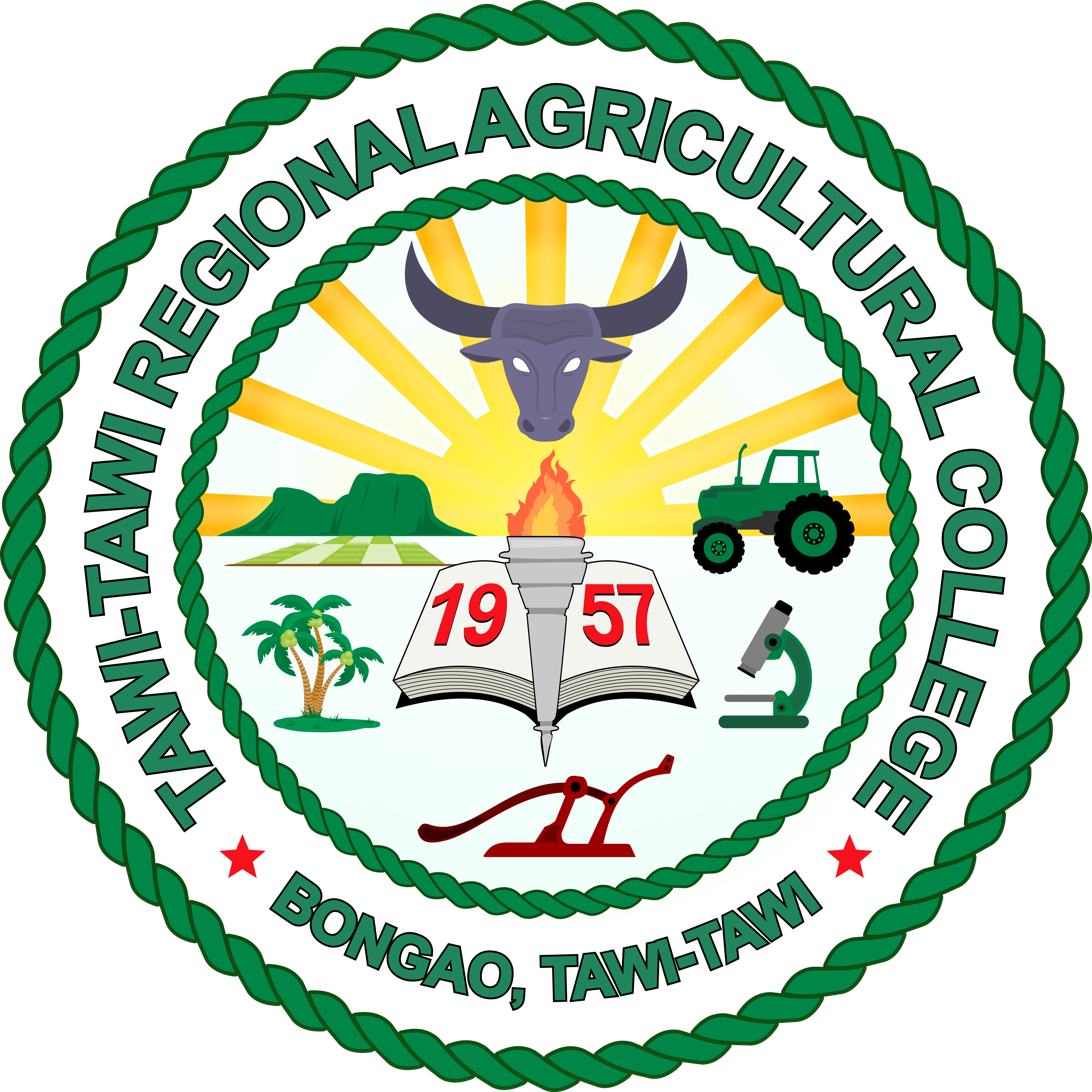
- Former name: Sulu National Regional Agricultural School (SNRAS) (1961-1973)
- Type: State college
- Established: 1957
- President: Hja. Sitti Amina J. Mohammad, Ph.D.
- Location: Bongao, Tawi-Tawi, Philippines; 5°01′30″N 119°45′37″E
- Website: trac.edu.ph
- Location in Mindanao Location in the Philippines

Tawi-Tawi Regional Agricultural College is a state college in the Province of Tawi-Tawi, Philippines. It is mandated to provide professional, technical, and special training and promote research, extension services, and progressive leadership in the field of agriculture and home technology. Its main campus is located in Bongao, Tawi-Tawi.

On April 2025, Dr. Sitti Amina J. Mohammad, was elected as the first female college president of TRAC, taking over the presidency from Dr. Mutti A. Asaali.
