= Surigao del Norte State University =

Public university in Surigao del Norte, Philippines

- Former names: Surigao del Norte School of Arts and Trades (1969–1998); Surigao State College of Technology (1998–2022)
- Type: State University
- Established: June 5, 1998; 28 years ago
- President: Dr. Rowena A. Plando
- Location: Surigao City, Surigao del Norte, Philippines; 9°47′14″N 125°29′40″E
- Campus: Surigao City Main Campus; Del Carmen Campus; Malimono Campus; Mainit Campus
- Colors: Green
- Nicknames: Trade, SSCT
- Website: snsu.edu.ph
- Location in Mindanao Location in the Philippines

Surigao del Norte State University (SNSU), formerly the Surigao State College of Technology, is a public university in the Philippines. It is mandated to provide advance education, higher technological, professional instruction and training in the fields of agriculture and environment studies, fishery, engineering, forestry, industrial technology, education, law, medicine and other health-related programs, information technology, arts and sciences, and other related courses. It is also mandated to undertake research and extension services, and provide progressive leadership in its areas of specialization. Its main campus is located in Surigao City.

== History ==
In 1969, the school was established as the Surigao del Norte School of Arts and Trades. In 1998, the school was renamed Surigao State College of Technology after it merged with the Malimono School of Fisheries.

== Elevation to university status ==
On June 4, 2013, Surigao del Norte State University was established under Rep. Act 10600, integrating Surigao del Norte State College of Technology with Siargao National College of Science and Technology in Del Carmen and the Surigao del Norte College of Agriculture and Technology in Mainit. The name change was yet to be implemented after it was amended by RA 11010 that the institution shall retain its status prior to the effectivity of this Act until it is able to comply with CHED requirements.

The school received university status in 2022.
