= Science and technology in the Philippines =

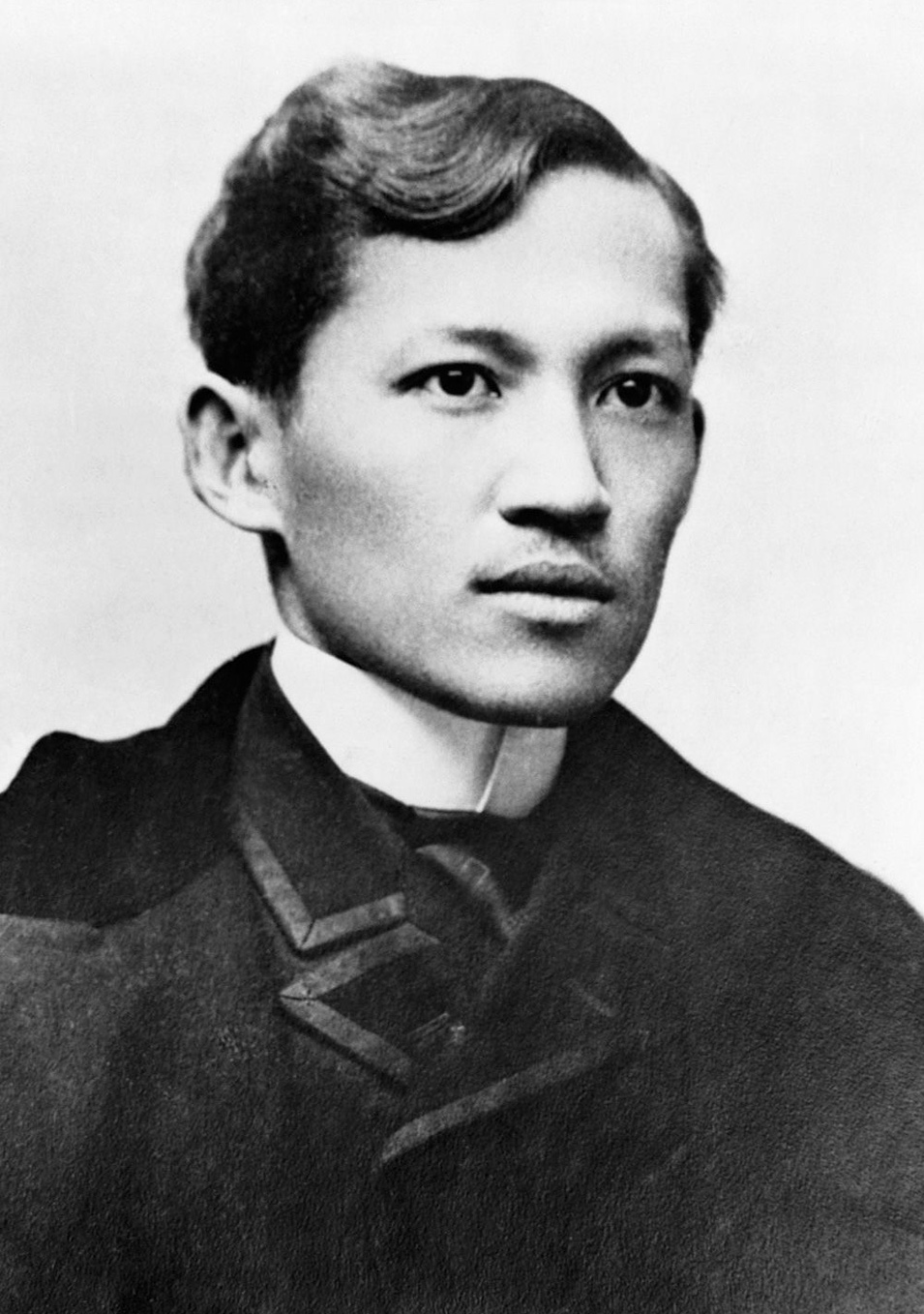
Philippine national hero José Rizal, who discovered a snail species that helped combat tropical disease, studied local wildlife, and performed one of the first cataract surgeries in the country on his mother

Science and technology in the Philippines refers to the country's scientific and technological development and the policies that support it. The main government agency responsible for managing science and technology programs is the Department of Science and Technology (DOST). It is supported by several sectoral councils and agencies that focus on forestry, agriculture and aquaculture, the metal industry, nuclear research, food and nutrition, health and virology, as well as the earth sciences, including meteorology, volcanology, and seismology.

Notable Filipino scientists include Fe del Mundo in pediatrics, Eduardo Quisumbing in plant taxonomy, Gavino Trono in tropical marine phycology, and María Orosa in food technology.

== History ==
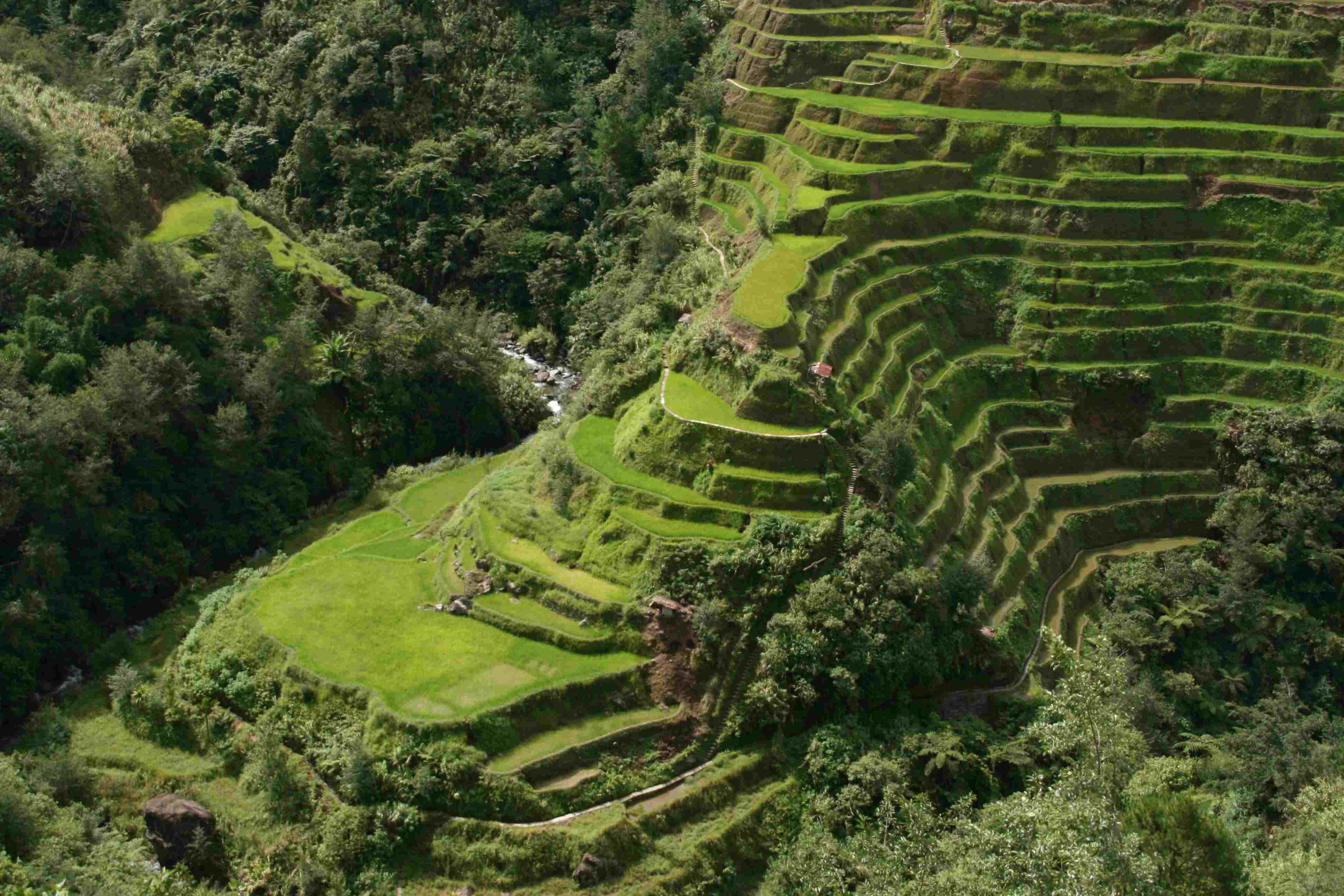
The Banaue Rice Terraces

=== Pre-Colonial Period ===
The Laguna Copperplate Inscription shows the use of mathematics in precolonial Philippine societies. A standard system of weights and measures is demonstrated by the use of precise measurement for gold, and familiarity with rudimentary astronomy is shown by fixing the precise day within the month in relation to the phases of the moon.

Shipbuilding showed geometric thinking and mastery of convexity, concavity, and the proper proportion between ship breadth and length to ensure sailing efficiency. The practice of constructing as much as twelve ships and boats to fit inside each other, not unlike matryoshka dolls containing each other, can be interpreted as large three-dimensional wooden demonstration of sets, subsets, volumes, and ordinality.

The Banaue Rice Terraces are among the sophisticated products of engineering by pre-Spanish era Filipinos.

=== Spanish Colonial Period ===
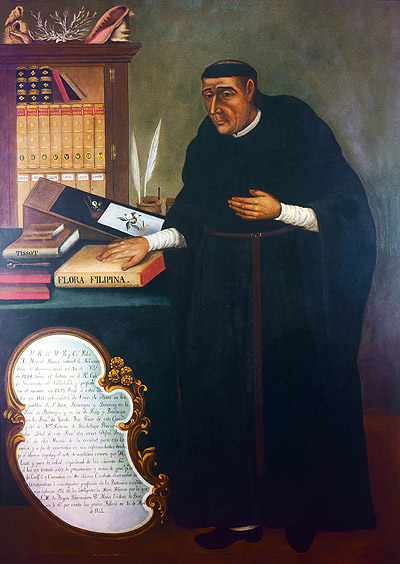
Friar and Botanist Manuel Blanco Ramos author of one of the first comprehensive flora of the Philippines,

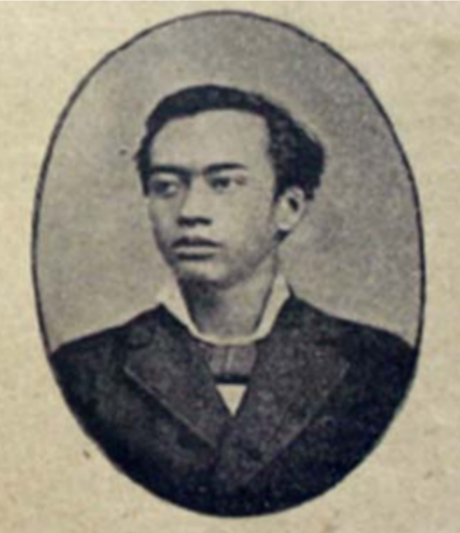
Anacleto del Rosario Invented the formula for producing a pure kind of alcohol from tuba

The colonization of the Philippines contributed to the growth of science and technology in the archipelago. The Spanish introduced formal education and founded scientific institution. During the early years of Spanish rule in the Philippines. Parish schools were established where religion, reading, writing, arithmetic and music was taught. Sanitation and more advanced methods of agriculture was taught to the natives. Later the Spanish established colleges and universities in the archipelago including the University of Santo Tomas.

Accounts by Spanish friars in the 1580s showed that astronomy was already known and practiced. The accounts also give the local names of constellations, such as Moroporo for the Pleiades and Balatik for Ursa Major among others.

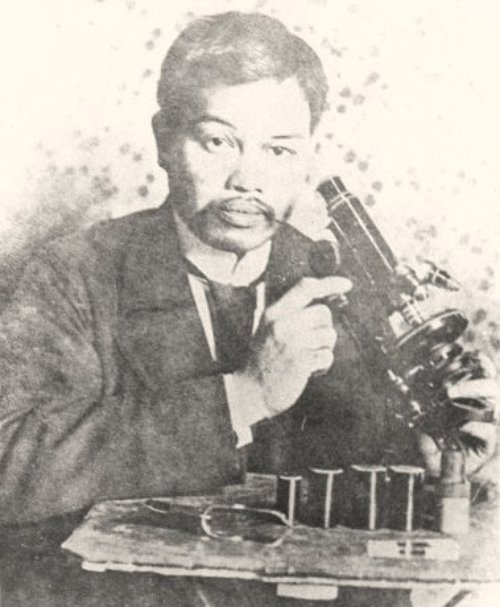
General Antonio Luna was also a scientist, chemist and a doctor who conducted a series of research on malaria and other tropical diseases, he was the first Filipino to earn a doctorate in science

In 1687, Isaac Newton included an explicit reference to the Philippines in his classic Philosophiæ Naturalis Principia Mathematica by mentioning Leuconia, the ancient Ptolemaic name for the Philippines.

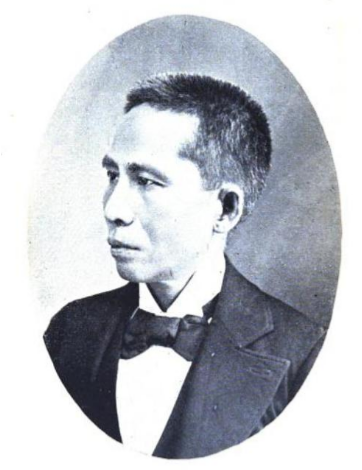
Botanist León María Guerrero

The study of medicine in the Philippines was given priority in the Spanish era, especially in the later years. The Spanish also contributed to the field of engineering in the islands by constructing government buildings, churches, roads, bridges and forts. Biology is given focus. Contributors to science in the archipelago during the 19th century were botanists, Fr. Ignacio Mercado., Dr. Trinidad Pardo de Tavera and Dr. Leon Ma Guerrero, chemist Anacleto del Rosario, and medicine scholars Dr. Manuel Guerrero, Dr. Jose Montes and Dr. Eliodoro Mercado. The Galleon Trade have accounted in the Philippine colonial economy. Trade was given more focus by the Spaniard colonial authorities due to the prospects of big profits. Agriculture and industrial development on the other hand were relatively neglected. The opening of the Suez Canal saw the influx of European visitors to the Spanish colony and some Filipinos were able to study in Europe who were probably influenced by the rapid development of scientific ideals brought by the Age of Enlightenment.

=== American Colonial Period and Post-Commonwealth era ===
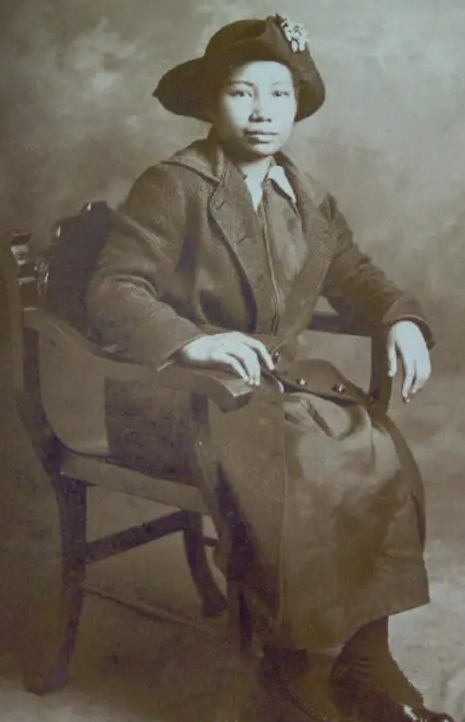
Filipina food technologist Maria Y. Orosa (1893–1945) is credited with inventing banana ketchup.

The progress of science and technology in the Philippines continued under American rule. On July 1, 1901, the Philippine Commission established the Bureau of Government Laboratories which was placed under the Department of Interior. The Bureau replaced the Laboratorio Municipal, which was established under the Spanish colonial era. The Bureau dealt with the study of tropical diseases and laboratory projects. On October 26, 1905, the Bureau of Government Laboratories was replaced by the Bureau of Science and on December 8, 1933, the National Research Council of the Philippines was established. The Bureau of Science became the primary research center of the Philippines until World War II.

Science during the American period was inclined towards agriculture, food processing, medicine and pharmacy. Not much focus was given on the development of industrial technology due to free trade policy with the United States which nurtured an economy geared towards agriculture and trade.

In 1946 the Bureau of Science was replaced by the Institute of Science. In a report by the US Economic Survey to the Philippines in 1950, there is a lack of basic information which were necessities to the country's industries, lack of support of experimental work and minimal budget for scientific research and low salaries of scientists employed by the government. In 1958, during the regime of President Carlos P. Garcia, the Philippine Congress passed the Science Act of 1958 which established the National Science Development Board.

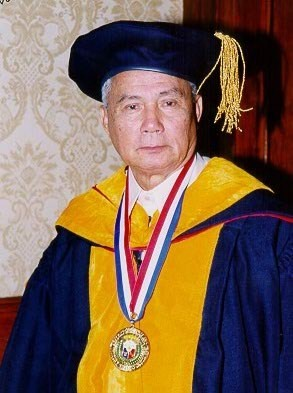
Angel Alcala is a national scientist noted for his work in marine and aquatic biology.

=== Marcos Era and Martial Law ===
During Ferdinand Marcos' presidency, the importance given to science grew. In the amended 1973 Philippine Constitution, Article XV, Section 9 (1), he declared that the "advancement of science and technology shall have priority in the national development." In his two terms of presidency and during Martial Law, he enacted many laws promoting science and technology.

In his Second State of the Nation Address on January 23, 1967, he declared that science was necessary for the development programs, and thus, directed the Department of Education to revitalize the science courses in public high schools. The Department of Education, with the National Science Development Board (NSDB), is organizing a project to provide selected high schools with science teaching equipment over a four-year period.

In his Third State of the Nation Address on January 22, 1968, he recognized that technology was the leading factor in economic development, and channeled additional funds to support projects in applied sciences and science education.

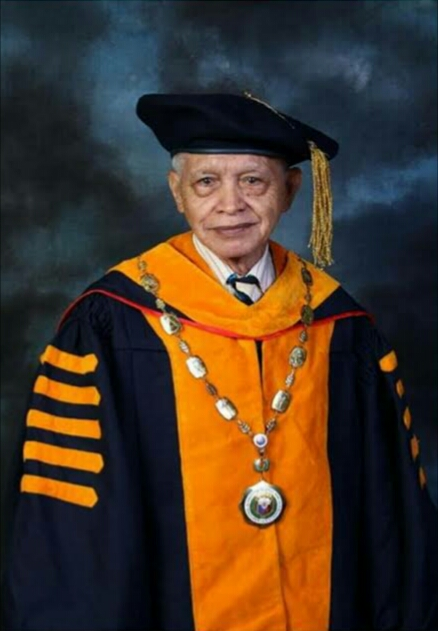
Dr. Ramon Barba ONS made it possible for Mangoes, which used to be highly seasonal in producing fruits, to be harvested all year round. His discoveries was adopted all over Mango producing places in the world - in Asia, Africa, Latin America and Australia.

In his Fourth State of the Nation Address on January 27, 1969, he gave a big part of the war damage fund to private universities to encourage them to create courses in science and technology and to research. He stated that he planned a project to have medical interns do a tour of duty in provincial hospitals to arouse their social consciousness and reduce the "brain drain." On April 6, 1968, he proclaimed 35 hectares in Bicutan, Taguig, Rizal as the site of the Philippine Science Community. The government also conducted seminars for public and private high school and college science teachers, training programs and scholarships for graduate and undergraduate science scholars, and workshops on fisheries and oceanography.

In his Fifth State of the Nation Address on January 26, 1970, he emphasized that the upgrading of science curricula and teaching equipment is crucial to the science development program. He added the Philippine Coconut Research Institute to the NSDB to modernize the coconut industry. The NSDB also established the Philippine Textile Research Institute. The Philippine Atomic Energy Commission of the NSDB explored the uses of atomic energy for economic development. Marcos assisted 107 institutions in undertaking nuclear energy work by sending scientists to study nuclear science and technology abroad, and providing basic training to 482 scientists, doctors, engineers, and technicians.

In his Seventh State of the Nation Address on January 24, 1972, he spoke about his major development projects in reforming sectors of education. Such projects included research and development schools, technical institutes, science education centers, and agricultural colleges and vocational high schools.

In 1972, he created the National Grains Authority to provide for the development of the rice and corn industry to fully harness it for the economy of the country. (Presidential Decree No. 4, s. 1972) He established the Philippine Council for Agricultural Research to support the progressive development of agriculture, forestry, and fisheries for the nation. It was attached to the Department of Agriculture and Natural Resources for administrative purposes. He provided further support for the promotion of scientific research and invention with Presidential Decree No. 49, s. 1972. This decree contains details on the protection of intellectual property for the creator or publisher of the work. He established the Philippine Atmospheric Geophysical and Astronomical Services Administration (PAGASA) under the Department of National Defense to provide environmental protection and to utilize scientific knowledge to ensure the safety of the people. (Presidential Decree No. 78, s. 1972)

In 1973, he created the Philippine National Oil Company to promote industrial and economic development through effective and efficient use of energy sources. (Presidential Decree No. 334, s. 1973)

In 1976, he enacted a law under Presidential Decree No. 1003-A, s. 1976 to establish the National Academy of Science and Technology, which is composed of scientists with "innovative achievement in the basic and applied sciences," to serve as a reservoir of scientific and technological expertise for the country.

In 1978, he created a Task Force on the formulation of a national action program on science and technology to assess policies and programs of science and technology. (Executive Order No. 512, s. 1978) In his Fourteenth State of the Nation Address on July 23, 1979, he said that the government invested funds and time in organizations for scientific research, such as the NSDB, the Philippine Council for Agricultural Research and Resources, the Plant Breeding Institute, the International Rice Research Institute, the Bureau of Plant Industry, and the Bureau of Forest Products. While these projects have had breakthroughs, the market machinery did not adapt and invest in this technology due to the high-risk front-end costs.

In 1979, he constituted the Health Sciences Center created by R.A. No. 5163 as an autonomous member within the University of the Philippines System to improve the internal organization and unity of leadership within its units. (Executive Order No. 519, s. 1979)

In 1980, he created the National Committee on Geological Sciences to advise government and private entities on matters concerning development in geological sciences. (Executive Order No. 625, s. 1980)

In 1982, he reorganized the National Science Development Board and its agencies into a National Science and Technology Authority to provide central direction and coordination of scientific and technological research and development. (Executive Order No. 784, s. 1982) He granted salary increases to the people with teaching positions in the Philippine Science High School due to their necessity in the advancement of national science. (Executive Order No. 810, s. 1982). He enacted a law on the completion of the National Agriculture and Life Sciences Research Complex at the University of the Philippines at Los Baños. (Executive Order No. 840, s. 1982)

In 1986, he established the Mindanao and Visayas campuses of the Philippine Science High School to encourage careers in science and technology and to be more accessible to the talented students in the Mindanao and Visayas areas. (Executive Order No. 1090, s. 1986)

=== Fifth Republic ===
In 1986, during Corazon Aquino's presidency, the National Science and Technology Authority was replaced by the Department of Science and Technology, giving science and technology a representation in the cabinet. Under the Medium Term Philippine Development Plan for the years 1987–1992, science and technology's role in economic recovery and sustained economic growth was highlighted. During Corazon Aquino's State of the Nation Address in 1990, she said that science and technology development shall be one of the top three priorities of the government towards an economic recovery.

On August 8, 1988, Corazon Aquino created the Presidential Task Force for Science and Technology which came up with the first Science and Technology Master Plan or STMP. The goal of STMP was for the Philippines to achieve newly industrialized country status by the year 2000. The Congress did not put much priority in handling bills related to science and technology. The Senate Committee on Science and Technology was one of the committees that handles the fewest bills for deliberation.

Former DOST Secretary Ceferin Follosco reported that the budget allocation for science and technology was increased to 1.054 billion pesos in 1989 from the previous year's 464 million pesos. However, due to the Asian financial crisis, budget allocation for the years 1990 and 1991 were trimmed down to 920 and 854 million pesos respectively. Budget allocation were increased to 1.7 billion pesos in 1992.

During her term, President Corazon Aquino encouraged scientists and inventors to bring the Philippines to its former position as second to only Japan in the field of science and technology. One of the goals of her administration was to achieve the status as being an industrialized country by 2000. She urged that the private research sector form a stronger bond between public research to help jump-start the progress in the area of Philippine Research and Development. It was also during this time in 1989 when the BPI-DOST Science Awards was started to recognize, award, and support the most exceptional science and engineering students from partner universities nationwide.

Ironically, it was during President Corazon Aquino's term and the reorganization of Philippine bureaucracy that Executive Order No.128 abolished R.A. No. 3859, also known as the “Philippine Inventors Incentive Act.” This Philippine Inventors Commission was under the Science Development board. It gave assistance to Filipino inventors through giving financial aid, patent application assistance, legal assistance, and to help inventors market their products domestically and abroad. Despite the abolishment of the Philippine Inventors Commission, her administration gave rise to new avenues for the government to aid the progress of Science and Technology in the country.

R.A. 6655 or the Free Public Secondary Education Act of 1988 opened doors to free education up to the secondary level, implemented in the education system together with this was the “Science for the Masses Program” which aimed at scientific and technological literacy among Filipinos. The Aquino administration recognized the importance of science and technology in the development of the Philippines into a newly industrialized country. Funding for the science and technology sector was tripled from 464 million in 1986 to 1.7 billion in 1992. The Science and Technology Master Plan was formulated which aimed at the modernization of the production sector, upgrading research activities, and development of infrastructure for science and technological purposes. A Research and Development Plan was also formulated to examine and determine which areas of research needed attention and must be given priority. The criteria for identifying the program to be pursued were, development of local materials, probability of success, potential of product in the export market, and its strategic nature. The grants for the research and development programs was included in the Omnibus Investment Law.

There were noticeable improvements regarding science and technology as stated in President Fidel Ramos' State of the Nation Address. In his third SONA, there was a significant increase in personnel specializing in the science and technology field. At 1998, the Philippines was estimated to have around 3,000 competent scientists and engineers. Adding to the increase of scientists would be the result of the two newly built Philippine Science High Schools in Visayas and Mindanao which promotes further development of young kids through advance S&T curriculum. The government provided 3,500 scholarships for students who were taking up professions related to S&T. Schools were becoming more modernized and updated with the addition of high-tech equipment for student improvement and teachers were getting training programs to benefit themselves and their students. Health care services were promoted through local programs such as "Doctors to the Barrio Program." The health care programs were innovative and effective as shown by the change in life expectancy from 67.5 years in 1992 to 69.1 years in 1995.

Priority for S&T personnel increased when Magna Carta for Science and Technology Personnel (Republic Act No. 8439) was established. The award was published in order to give incentives and rewards for people who have been influential in the field of S&T. In the sixth SONA, education was one of the primary story-lines wherein programs such as National Program for Gifted Filipino Children in Science and Technology and enactment of a law creating a nationwide system of high schools specializing in the field of science and engineering.

Fidel V. Ramos believes that science and technology was one of the means wherein the Philippines could attain the status of new industrialized country (NIC). During his term, he was able to establish programs that were significant to the field of S&T. In 1993, Science and Technology Agenda for National Development (STAND) was established. Among its priorities were: (1) exporting winners identified by the DTI; (2) domestic needs identified by the President's Council for Countryside Development; (3) support industries and (4) coconut industry development. Congress, during his term, was able to enact laws that were significant for the field. Among were: (1) Magna Carta for Science and Technology Personnel (Republic Act No. 8439); (2) Science and Technology Scholarship Law of 1994 (Republic Act No. 7687) and (3) Inventors and Inventions Incentives Act (Republic Act No. 7459). The Intellectual Property Code of the Philippines (Republic Act No. 8293) was enacted during Ramos' term. The law provides industrial property rights, copyrights and related rights, and technology transfer arrangements.

In President Joseph Estrada's term, two major legislations that he signed were Philippine Clean Air Act of 1999 (Republic Act No. 8749) which was designed to protect and preserve the environment and ensure the sustainable development of its natural resources, and Electronic Commerce Act of 2000 (Republic Act No. 8792) which outlaws computer hacking and provides opportunities for new businesses emerging from the Internet-driven New Economy. Aside from these, in his first State of the Nation Address, President Estrada launched a full-scale program based on cost-effective irrigation technologies. He also announced that Dole-outs are out, which meant basic health care, basic nutrition, and useful education for those who want, but cannot afford it. Lastly, he said that they would speed up the program to establish one science high school in every province. It was in his second State of the Nation Address that President Estrada announced the passage of the Clean Air Act, and the decision to pursue the 15-year modernization program of the Armed Forces of the Philippines. His last State of the Nation Address pushed for the advancement of industries and schools into the Internet age, as well as the announcement of the passage of the e-Commerce Act.

In the Gloria Macapagal-Arroyo administration, the science and technology sector of the Philippines was dubbed as the "golden age" of science and technology by then secretary Estrella Albastro ^{[3]}. Numerous laws and projects that concerns both the environment and science to push technology as a tool to increase the country's economic level. This is to help increase the productivity from Science, Technology and Innovations (STI) and help benefit the poor people. Moreover, the term "Filipinnovation" was the coined term used in helping the Philippines to be an innovation hub in Asia.^{[4]}

The STI was developed further by strengthening the schools and education system such as the Philippine Science High School (PSHS), which focuses in science, technology and mathematics in their curriculum. This helps schools produce get more involve in this sector. Private sectors were also encouraged to participate in developing the schools through organizing events and sponsorships. Future Filipino scientists and innovators can be produced through this system^{[4]}

Helping the environment was one of the focus in developing technology in the Philippines. One of the more known laws to be passed by her administration was the R.A. 9367 or the "Biofuels" act. This act promotes the development and usage of biofuels throughout the country. This potentially enables a cheaper alternative to gasoline as a medium in producing energy. Also, this benefits the environment since it boasts a cleaner emission compared to regular fuel. Yet, setbacks such as lack of raw materials is holding the full implementation of the laws since importing the necessary materials are imported more.^{[5]} On one had, drought-free rice was also highly encouraged to by used during her term. This enables farmers to produce rice despite the environmental hazards that slows or stops the production.^{[3]}

In an effort to improve the efficiency of both land and water, the government imposes Republic Act 10601 which improves the Agriculture and Fisheries Sector through Mechanization (AFMech). RA 10601 covers research, development, and extension (RDE), promotion, distribution, supply, assembling, manufacturing, regulation, use, operation, maintenance and project implementation of agricultural and fisheries machinery and equipment (Section 4).

The Philippines ranked 50th on the Global Innovation Index in 2025.

== Science and technology fields ==
=== Life sciences ===
Life sciences is a broad field that encompasses numerous specializations. It is commonly defined by sciences that pertain to living organisms including microorganisms, plants, animals, and human beings. Some of the well-known fields in the Life Sciences include zoology, botany, biology, microbiology, biotechnology, and biomedical technologies.

In the Philippines, the life sciences are under the Department of Science and Technology (DOST), a government office that coordinates and funds researches by Filipino scientists and inventors. This can assist the progress of science and technology within the Philippines. There are multiple agencies under DOST that cater to specialized fields - the Philippine Atmospheric, Geophysical and Astronomical Services Administration (PAGASA), Philippine Institute of Volcanology and Seismology (PHIVOLCS), and the Philippine Council for Agriculture, Aquatic, and Natural Resources Research and Development (PCAARRD).

==== Botany and biology ====
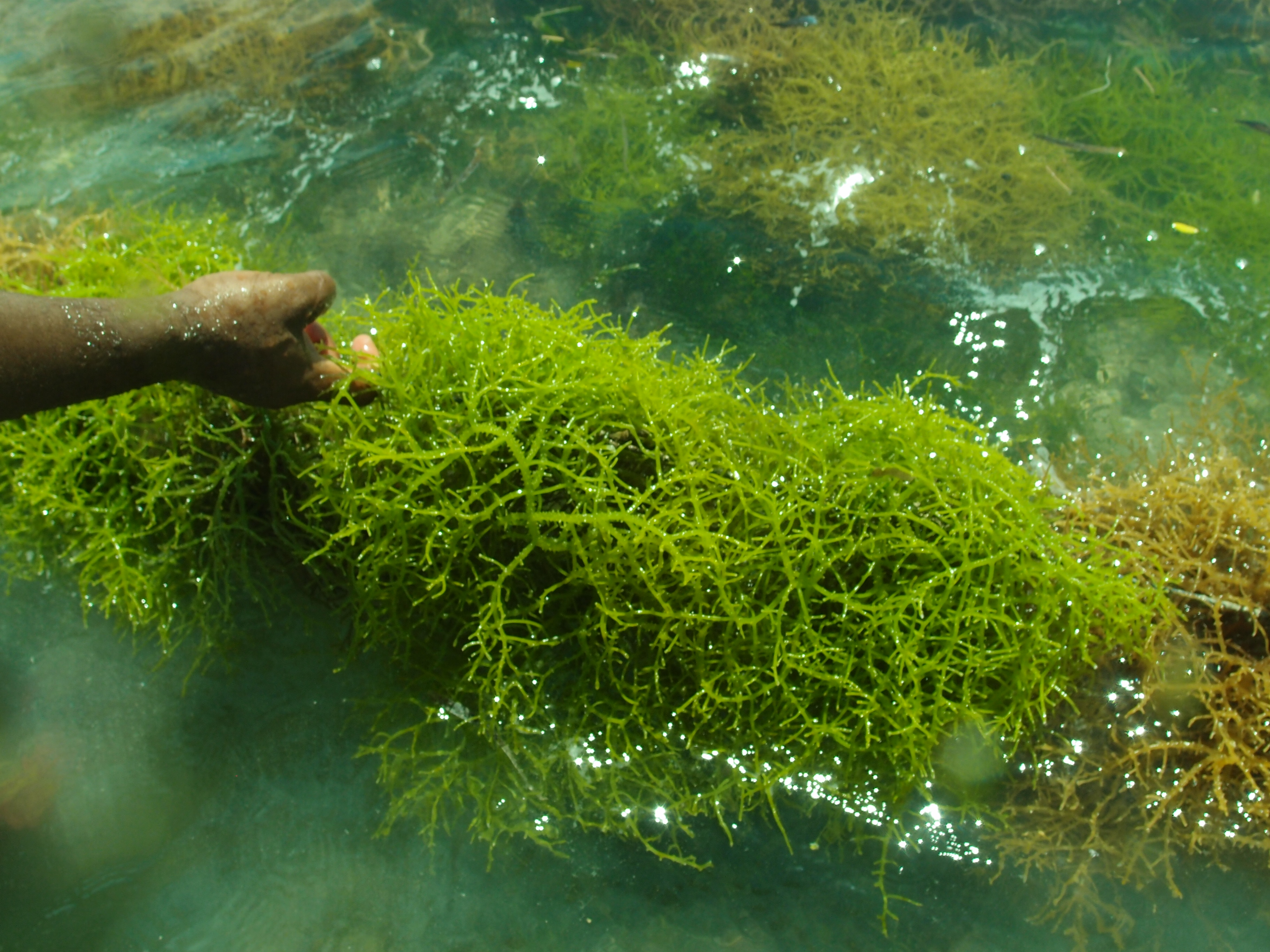
Eucheuma denticulatum is a species of red alga that naturally exists in the country.

Several Filipino scientists have pioneered in the field of biology. For example, Eduardo Quisumbing, a biologist who graduated MS in Botany at the University of the Philippines Los Baños in 1921, and Ph.D. in Plant Taxonomy, Systematics and Morphology at the University of Chicago in 1923. He conducted research on taxonomic and morphological papers deal with orchids and authored the book Medicinal Plants of the Philippines. The species of Saccolabium quisumbingii was named after him. Dioscoro L. Umali, is an agriculturist that was dubbed as the Father of Philippine Plant Breeding due to the programs he conducted that are related to rainfed and upland agriculture, social forestry, and environmental preservation. Marine biologists helped improve the knowledge on aquatic resources such as Angel Alcala, a biologist who was recognized for his research on amphibians and reptiles diversity and marine biodiversity in the country and served as a consultant on marine and aquatic projects under the United Nations Environment Programme, World Bank, Asian Development Bank and others, Gavino Trono, a biologist who was dubbed as the Father of Kappaphycus farming for his contributions to the study of tropical marine phycology, focusing on seaweed biodiversity, established the largest phycological herbarium in the country – the G.T. Velasquez Herbarium in the University of the Philippines’ Marine Science Institute, and authored a book that was considered as the most authoritative books in the country on the seaweed flora titled Field guide and atlas of the seaweed resources of the Philippines.

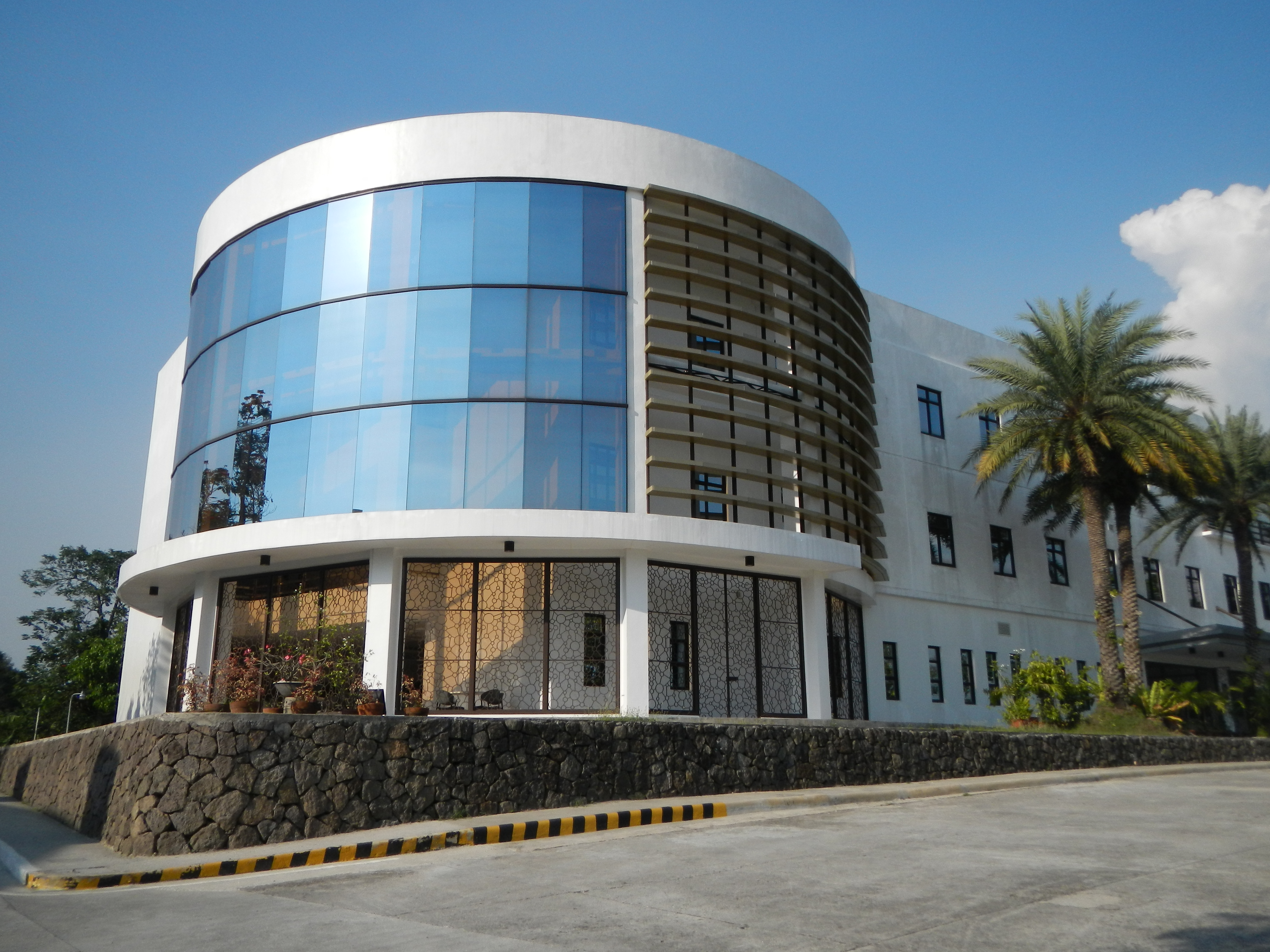
National Institute of Molecular Biology and Biotechnology Building at UP Diliman.

==== Biotechnology ====
The Philippines Biofuel Act of 2006, RA 9376 mandates an increase of the minimum 5% bioethanol blend (E5) in gasoline to 10% ethanol blend (E10). In 2011, 600 million liters of gasoline was consumed by car owners in the Philippines, if the 10% bioethanol blend would be followed, this would be equivalent to 1 million metric tons of sugar.

Ethanol is an alcohol produced from fermenting carbohydrates in plants. Bioethanol can be produced mainly from three different kinds of raw materials, namely simple sugars, starch, and lignocellulosic biomass. Since the prices of the raw materials are very volatile and can easily change, lignocellulosic biomass has been extensively studied due to its cheap price and abundance in agricultural countries like the Philippines. Some of the top sources of lignocellulosic biomass include forest residues, municipal solid wastes, and agricultural wastes such as sugarcane baggase, nipa sap, rice straws, etc.

Numerous studies have been done by Filipino scientists on the raw materials that will achieve an efficient and cost-effective bioethanol production. Studies on nipa sap showed that molasses is more advantageous to use, as for the same amount of bioethanol produced, a greater amount of nipa sap was needed compared to molasses. A study by Tan et al.reports on corn as being viable for bioethanol production, and has the potential to yield around 0.37 Liters per kilogram of corn used. Other studies highlighted that sugarcane juice produced approximately 70 Liters per ton of sugar. However, using sugarcane juice as the primary feedstock for bioethanol production is deemed problematic, as this would mean it would be competing with the sugar production in the country. Filipino scientists continue to search for alternatives to sugarcane. The field of lignocellulosic agricultural wastes provides opportunity for abundant and very cheap resources.

A study by Del Rosario in 1982 identified sweet sorghum as a possible source of ethanol, a very adaptive crop that can withstand drought and grow in the low-lands as well as in the high lands. A study by the International Crop Research Institute for the Semi-arid Tropics (ICRISAT) showed that the production costs for sweet sorghum is higher than sugarcane by 4.28%, but this is balanced out by the grain yield of 1 ton per hectare. In 2007, the University of Philippines-Los Banos, together with the Bureau of Agricultural Research (BAR) and ICRISAT conducted studies on sweet sorghum as feedstock for bioethanol production.

In 2013, BAR announced that the country may start producing its first sweet sorghum-based bioethanol. The Philippine National Oil Co. -Alternative Fuels Corp and the San Carlos Bioenergy Inc. discussed the creation of a 1,000 hectare sweet sorghum plantation solely for the purpose of using the produce as feedstock for bioethanol production.

=== Engineering ===
Engineering is the field of science that applies both science and math to solve problems, such fields include mechanical engineering, electrical engineering, civil engineering, structural engineering, and industrial engineering. It concerns the use of technology in practical ways that can advance the human condition.

In the Philippines, many organizations and research institutes for engineering were established, such as the National Engineering Center and the Philippine Institute of Civil Engineers.

The National Engineering Center (NEC) was first established on January 27, 1978, as the research arm of the University of the Philippines College of Engineering. It absorbed the UP Industrial Research Service Center, the National Hydraulic Research Center, the Training Center for Applied Geodesy and Photogrammetry, the Transport Training Center, and the Building Research Service.

The Philippine Institute of Civil Engineers (PICE) was the result of the merging of two separate civil engineer organizations, the Philippine Society of Civil Engineers (PSCE) and the Philippine Association of Civil Engineers (PACE), on December 11, 1973. It was given accreditation by the Professional Regulation Commission on August 13, 1975, as the only official recognized organization of civil engineers in the Philippines. It was established to advance the knowledge and research and to maintain high ethical standards of civil engineering.

The University of the Philippines further established the National Center for Transportation Studies (NCTS) to contribute to scholarly research and training in the field of transportation. They advocate sustainable transport, integrated transport system, road safety, and institutional development. They release advisories and feature studies by both undergraduate and graduate students on transportation. For example, the NCTS website links to downloads of Emer T. Quezon's research into the effects of flyover construction on traffic flow in Nagtahan and R. Magsaysay Boulevard intersection in 1994, as well as the research of Franklyn T. Amistad and Jose Regin F. Regidor, Dr. Eng. researched into ways to improve traffic management and congestion in Vigan without sacrificing its legacy as a World Heritage Site.

Ricardo G. Sigua is a professor who contributed to engineering research in the Philippines. Sigua, a professor at the Institute of Civil Engineering in the University of the Philippines, Diliman, wrote a book called The Fundamentals of Traffic Engineering due to the scarcity of textbooks on the traffic engineering relevant to the Philippine context. His book covers topics such as traffic management and regulations, traffic flow, traffic studies, intersection design and control, geometric design of highways, road safety, traffic accident analysis, travel demand forecasting, the origin-destination table (OD Matrix), and the intelligent transportation system.

Electronic products accounted for 40% of the Philippines' export revenue in April 2013, according to the Semiconductor and Electronics Industry in the Philippines, Inc., which groups 250 Filipino and foreign companies, including Intel. The share of high-tech products among exports declined between 2008 and 2013 from US$26.9 billion to US$19.7 billion.

=== Agriculture and aquaculture ===
Agriculture is the field in science concerned with the different techniques of land cultivation and crop and livestock raising. The Department of Agriculture (Philippines) (DA) is a government agency responsible for the development of the Philippine's agriculture by generating policies, investments, and support services for local and export-oriented trade. In the Philippine Development Plan (PDP), Chapter 4: Competitive and Sustainable Agriculture and Fisheries Sector, both agriculture and fisheries sector provide the needs and raw materials for the market and surplus labor to the industry and service sectors. The focus for improvement would be to create jobs and raise income for farmers and encourage participation from them. Development of the agricultural sector is critical in maintaining an affordable price for food especially for the poor, which could lead to inclusive growth and poverty reduction. Proceso J. Alcala is a former district representative and appointed DA secretary by President Benigno Aquino III in 2010. He is considered the 'Father of Organic Agriculture' because of his work in the Organic Agricultural Act of 2010 (RA 10068).

Developments regarding the research and technology of Philippine agriculture are currently in the works. Most of the researches are inclined in solving the problem of increasing hunger in the country by creating a more efficient and cheaper process of yielding produce. The International Rice Research Institute (IRRI) is an international research consortium, including the Philippines, which serves to improve the rice production and quality through biotechnology and research. One of their ongoing research involves changing the normal C3 carbon fixation mechanism of rice into a supercharged photosynthetic mechanism, C4 carbon fixation. Converting rice from a C3 plant into a C4 plant would be beneficial because the latter can efficiently produce more yield than the former in a given and limited amount of resources (land, water, and fertilizer). IRRI have made calculations that show that converting rice into a C4 plant would increase the yield at around 30-50%, demonstrating a double water-use efficiency, and providing more while using less fertilizer. Other rice varieties have been developed to increase efficiency without sacrificing the quality too much. PSB Rc26H (Magat), PSB Rc72H (Mestizo), and PSB Rc76H (Panay) are some of the rice hybrids developed but only Mestizo is currently available for planting. The texture and taste quality of Mestizo is comparable to the normal grain, IR64.

Overall records and statistics about Philippine agricultural growth is provided by the CountrySTAT Philippines. In 2014, gross domestic product (GDP) increased by 6.13%. The gross value added (GVA) in agriculture and fishing went up by 1.60% and this accounted for 10% of the GDP increase. There was an increase in the production of livestock rated at 1.01%. Gross outputs of the following livestock showed an increase at different rates: hog, cattle, carabao, goat, chicken, duck, and other products such as chicken eggs and dairy. There was an increase in the prices of different produce such as crops, fruits, and livestock and a decrease in the prices of vegetables. Food and other non-alcoholic beverage had an increase of 6.68%. Earnings from exports increased by 5.78% and top earners were from coconut oil and banana. Expenditures for imports increased by 19.86% and the highest spending were from wheat and milk products. The labor force totaled to 40.05 million and 11.21 million were employed in the agriculture sector, which was around 30% of the national employment.

=== Metal industry ===
This industry deals with the creation and innovation of metallic and steel products. The metal/steel industry has shown growing product innovation over the centuries. The industry's economic and political influence has also grown. The Philippines has become part of the growing revolution of the industry. The Metal Industry Research and Development Center (MIRDC) is a government agency under the Department of Science and Technology that supports the local metals and engineering industry through support services enhancing the industry's competitive advantage. The MIRDC was established in 1966 through Republic Act No. 4724 to foster the advancement of metals engineering and allied industries in the country.The agency's mission would consist of providing both public and private sectors professional management and technical expertise, quality control, research and development, technology transfer, and business advisory services.

MIRDC has been cooperating with different organizations to create technology for various improvements and purposes. The Automated Guideway Transit (AGT) System and the Road Train were unveiled to the public during the annual Lantern Parade at the University of the Philippines Diliman. These were a collaboration between UP Diliman and MIRDC for the purpose of faster travel time for students in UP and the public. It had two stations, one located along C.P. Garcia and the other along the University Avenue. The Hand Tractor was from the works of both MIRDC and the Center for Postharvest Development and Mechanization (PhilMech). The concept of the equipment is a transplanter-attached hand tractor and harvester-attached hand tractor wherein rice transplanting and harvesting implements are readily available from the tractor. Farmers would benefit from this because of the reduced cost and more utilization of hand tractor.

Statistics on recent steel and steel-related industry developments were published by the Census of Philippine Business and Industry (CPBI) of the National Statistics Office (NSO) with 2001 as the reference year. The industry totaled to 1,895 establishments which made up 29.6% of the manufacturing firms. Of all the establishments, 403 or 21.3% of the steel industries were from intermediate steel sector and 1,246 were from manufacturing industries. The steel industry was able to contribute 369,985 workers to the manufacturing sector. Total compensation paid by the steel industry reached to P47.9 billion which represented about 41.2% of the total salaries and employers' contributions to SSS/GSIS. The total expenses incurred by the industry were valued at P692.6 billion which accounted for 48.8% of the costs incurred by the manufacturing establishments. The total output of the industry was estimated at P832 billion which accounted for 46.3% of the manufacturing output valued at P1,795.8 billion.

=== Food and nutrition ===
Food science or nutritional science is the field of science studying the nature of foods and the natural changes in them resulting from handling and processing. It is the science concerned with food and nourishment and the role of nutrients in health. In the Philippines, food and nutrition research investigates the ideal diet for Filipinos to solve the problem of malnutrition and the current state of nutrition.

The Food and Nutrition Research Institute (FNRI) is the principal research arm of the Philippine government in food and nutrition. It was first created in 1947 as the Institute of Nutrition to serve as a clearing-house of data and information regarding nutrition. In 1949, it was authorized to conduct research in the applied science of food, as well. The FNRI was reorganized in Executive Order No. 128, s. 1987 to redefine its mandate to research food and nutrition in order to research and identify solutions to malnutrition problems, develop programs, projects, and policies to address malnutrition, and disseminate these findings. In accordance with these functions, the Food Composition Laboratory was established. Now known as the Food Analytical Service Laboratory (FASL), it is the pioneering laboratory researching into the food and nutrient composition of Philippine foods. Their services include chemical testing, microbiological testing, physico-chemical testing, and research and consultancy services. FNRI also develops simple recipes for small scale and household use, especially for the consumption by infants and children. They provide the nutritional information, properties and even market potential.

Aside from the FNRI, Philippine scientists have been researching into food science. Patricia T. Arroyo, Ph.D., an assistant professor and chairman of the Department of Fisheries Technology of the University of the Philippines, Diliman wrote The Science of Philippine Foods as a reference for students of food chemistry and food technology to be used instead of foreign books. This book is a compilation of scattered literature about Philippine foods and contains information about the structure, composition, methods in preparation, standards of quality, preservation, and experiments about various food such as eggs, rice, red meat, poultry, fish, fruits, vegetables, fats, oils, milk, milk products, wheat, flour, and sugar.

Maria Ligaya T. Braganza, Ed.D., the Dean of the School of Food Science and Technology at the Philippine Women's University conducts applied researches on food and product development. One of her studies investigates the use of banana flour as a wheat flour extender in pan de sal and doughnuts.

Ame P. Garong, a museum researcher at the National Museum of the Philippines, published Ancient Filipino Diet: Reconstructing Diet from Human Remains Excavated in the Philippines based on her doctoral dissertation. Using isotope analysis, she reconstructed the diet from the archaeological human remains from different burial sites in the Philippines. Based on the bone, hair, muscle samples and plant and animal tissues, Garong traced the diet of ancient Filipinos. Filipinos in the pre-colonial and early colonial past ate mostly aquatic resources (such as marine fish, freshwater shellfish, and coral reef resources). Some samples showed that the ancient Filipinos practiced prolonged breast feeding.

=== Health ===
One aspect of healthcare is the diagnosis, treatment and prevention of diseases; the other pertains to provisions for medical care for people in the community. In the Philippines, healthcare is under the Department of Health (DOH). This government office is responsible for organizing public healthcare and making sure that all Filipino citizens have access to quality health services. This office is also responsible for supervising and funding researches pertaining to new medicines and medical devices. The DOH has different bureaus, all of which have different areas of specialization, these are the Bureau of Health Devices and Technology, Bureau of Health Facilities and Services, Bureau of International Health Cooperation, Bureau of Local Health Development, Bureau of Quarantine and International Health Surveillance, and Food and Drug Administration. The DOH has a budget of Php 87.6 billion for the year 2015. The Secretary of Health is nominated by the President of the Republic of the Philippines, the incumbent Secretary of Health is Janette Garin; she was appointed last February 17, 2015.

The DOH has recently implemented the Philippines eHealth Strategic Framework and Plan (2013-2017). This focuses on the application of Information and Communications Technologies for healthcare. It draws up a long-term strategic plan for the development and implementation of eHealth services in the Philippines. It looks into realizing a national electronic public-health information systems, if this is reached, it can greatly improve the surveillance and response to health emergencies, it can also impact researches of epidemiological nature, greatly speeding up the process as sampling would be very convenient already. Another program recently started by the DOH is the Universal Health Care high Impact Five (UHC-Hi-5), which focuses on the regional operations and its convergence in high priority poverty program areas. Its goal is for tangible outputs within a 15-month period of its implementation.

==== Anti-cancer research ====
Soybean is a very sought-after crop, as its by products are used to generate bioethanol, and most importantly it is linked with cancer research. During the past decade, soybean has been extensively studied due to its 43-amino acid polypeptide called Lunasin. The anti-cancer properties of Lunasin was first discovered by Dr Alfredo Galvez and Dr. Benito de Lumen, both Filipino doctors, when they were enhancing the nutritional properties of soy protein. Dr. Galvez observed mitotic disruptive properties of Lunasin in mammalian cancer cells, he saw that it prevented normal cells from turning into cancerous cells. This eventually lead to more research about its anti-cancer properties. In 2005, Dr. de Lumen conducted an experiment on Lunasin using skin cancer mouse models, he discovered that Lunasin internalizes in mammals within minutes of exogenous application, it eventually ends up in the nucleus wherein it inhibits the acetylation of core histones. Dr de Lumen observed that in spite of Lunasin's anti-cancer properties, it does not inhibit the growth of normal mammalian cell lines.

A very recent study on Lunasin showed that at certain doses, it reduced non-small cell lung cancer tumor volume by 63%, it also showed a capability of inhibiting non-small cell lung cancer cells by suppressing the cell-cycle dependent phosphorylation of the retinoblastoma protein. More studies of Lunasin also showed that it possesses antioxidative, anti-inflammatory, and a cholesterol regulating role; all of which makes it a very good potential source of dietary supplements. All of these researches would have not been at the level of where it is now, if not for the Filipino doctors who first discovered Lunasin.

=== Social sciences ===
Encarnación Alzona, the first Filipina to get a Ph.D.

Notable Filipino scientists have been contributors in the field of social science in the country. Raul V. Fabella was an academic, economist and scientist that graduated in Seminario Mayor-Recoletos (Bachelor of Philosophy; 1970); the University of the Philippines School of Economics (Master of Arts; 1975); and Yale University (Doctor of Philosophy; 1982). He had written articles in both theoretical and applied fields: political economy and rent-seeking; the theory of teams; regulation; international economics; and mathematical economics and was associated with the concepts of "Olson ratio", in rent-seeking, egalitarian Nash bargaining solutions and debt-adjusted real effective exchange rate. Teodoro Agoncillo, a 20th-century Filipino historian, and received the national scientist award for his contributions in the field of history. He graduated from the University of the Philippines (Bachelor of Philosophy; 1934) and finished his Master of Arts degree in the same university in 1935. He also wrote books regarding the Philippine History like History of the Filipino People. Encarnación Alzona, a pioneering Filipino historian, educator and suffragist, became the first Filipina to obtain a Doctor of Philosophy (Ph.D.). She got her degree in history and a master's degree from the University of the Philippines and later, in 1920, obtained another master's degree in history from Radcliffe College, and a Ph.D. from Columbia University in 1923. She was an advocate of women suffrage in the Philippines and authored the book The Filipino Woman: Her Social, Economic and Political Status (1565-1933). that stated a stable account for women despite their lack in political and social rights.

=== Forestry ===
Forestry is the field of science that practice planting, managing and taking care of trees. The governing body for the Philippine forestry is the Department of Environment and Natural Resources (DENR). This department started way back in 1863, when the Spanish Royal Decree established the Inspeccion General de Montes. This was transformed into the Department of Interior in 1901. Then when the government reorganized, it became the Department of Agriculture and Natural Resources. During 1987, the Department of Environment and Natural Resources was formally established. Under this department, the Forest Management Bureau was the sector that focuses on preserving the forest and the harvesting of its resources.

The Philippines have an actual forest cover at 6.5 million hectares (ha) or 24% of the total land area. A lot of Filipinos rely on these resources for their survival. The country's goal is to have a sustainable forest-based industry that can contribute to the socio-economic development and support the disadvantaged sectors of society. Several projects have been started by the Forest Products Research and Development and Institute (FPRDI) to accomplish this goal. It starts with the identification of the nation's tree species. and subsequently developing the products-based industry of wood and lumber. The institute also covers the sustainable creation of furnishings using wood, bamboo, rattan and vines.

=== Natural disaster preparedness ===
The Philippines is one of the world's most vulnerable countries to natural disasters. Every year, between six and nine tropical cyclones make landfall, alongside other extreme events such as floods and landslides. In 2013, the Philippines had the misfortune to lie in the path of Cyclone Haiyan (known as Yolanda in the Philippines), possibly the strongest tropical cyclone ever to hit land, with winds that were clocked at up to 380 km/h.

To address disaster risk, the Philippines has been investing heavily in critical infrastructure and enabling tools such as Doppler radars, generating 3D disaster-simulation models from Light Detection and Ranging (LiDAR) technology and the wide-scale installation of locally developed sensors for accurate and timely disaster information nationwide. In parallel, it has been building local capability to apply, replicate and produce many of these technologies.

== Science, technology and innovation policy ==
=== Strategic framework and related legislation ===
==== Harmonized Agenda, 2002-2020 ====
The Department of Science and Technology is the key government institution for science and technology, with policy development being co-ordinated by a series of sectorial councils. Within the framework of the current National Science and Technology Plan, 2002–2020 (NSTP), the strategic focus is on building technological self-reliance. The Harmonized Agenda for Science and Technology, 2002–2020 reflects this focus in its approach to problem-solving related to inclusive growth and disaster risk reduction. The Harmonized Agenda was presented to the President in August 2014. Although science and technology are guided by the NSTP, the Harmonized Agenda attempts to provide more detail of how the country can become technologically self-reliant to sustain science and technology beyond the mandate of the administration in power at the time of the Agenda's adoption.

The Harmonized Agenda focuses on the development of critical technologies such as remote sensing, LiDAR processing, testing and metrology facilities, advanced climate change and weather modelling, advanced manufacturing and high-performance computing. Five centres of excellence are being established or upgraded by 2020 in biotechnology, nanotechnology, genomics, semiconductors and electronic design. The five centres of excellence are all government-funded:

- the Centre for Nanotechnology Application in Agriculture, Forestry and Industry (est. 2014) is based at the University of the Philippines Los Baños;
- the Biotech Pilot Plant (est. 2012 and since upgraded) is housed at the University of the Philippines Los Baños;
- the Philippine Genome Centre (est. 2009) is hosted by the University of the Philippines Diliman; it operates two core facilities in DNA sequencing and bioinformatics;
- the Advanced Device and Materials Testing Laboratory is located in the Department of Science and Technology's compound in Bicutan in Taguig City and has been operational since 2013; it houses three laboratories in surface analysis, thermal, chemical and metallurgical analysis; n the Electronic Product Development Centre will also be located in the Department of Science and Technology's compound in Bicutan in Taguig City; it will provide state-of-the-art design, prototyping and testing facilities for printed circuit boards.

The government policies outlined above are seeking to create and fund infrastructure to support the development of ‘core technologies', in order to solve pressing problems. This approach reinforces the economic rationale for government intervention in the science system to address market failures and make markets work within the purview of good governance. A key challenge will be to build sufficiently solid infrastructure to sustain current efforts. One example of the virtues of sustained support for research is the International Rice Research Institute based in the city of Los Baños.

==== Legislative reform ====
The Technology Transfer Act (2010) is expected to enhance innovation by providing a framework and support system for the ownership, management, use and commercialization of intellectual property arising from government-funded research and development (R&D).

To better address needs in terms of human capital, the Fast- Tracked Science and Technology Scholarship Act (2013) expands the coverage of existing scholarship programmes and strengthens the teaching of science and mathematics in secondary schools. The Philippine National Health Research System Act (2013), meanwhile, has formed a network of national and regional research consortia to boost domestic capacity.

=== Trends in investment in R&D ===
==== Human investment in R&D ====
The Philippines trails its more dynamic ASEAN peers for investment in both education and research. The country invested 0.3% of GDP in higher education in 2009, one of the lowest ratios among ASEAN countries. After stagnating for the first half of the century, tertiary enrolment leapt from 2.6 million to 3.2 million between 2009 and 2013. The rise in PhD graduates has been even more spectacular, their number having doubled over the same five-year period from 1 622 to 3 305, according to the UNESCO Institute for Statistics. This may explain the leap in the number of researchers in just a few years. The Philippines counted just 78 researchers (in full-time equivalents) per million inhabitants in 2007 but the country's researcher density had more than doubled to 188 researchers per million inhabitants by 2013, according to the UNESCO Institute for Statistics. This is still well below the global average of 1,083 per million (2013).

Scientific output is modest, with Filipino scientists producing just nine articles per million inhabitants in 2014, according to Thomson Reuters' Web of Science (Science Citation Index Expanded). The global average in 2014 was 176 publications per million. Seven out of ten Filipino researchers (70%) co-authored papers with foreign scientists between 2008 and 2014; their preferred collaborators were based in the US, Japan, Australia, China and the United Kingdom, in descending order.

In 2025, UNESCO completed an AI Readiness Assessment in collaboration with the Philippine government, focusing on ethical AI governance, policy frameworks, and capacity building for AI across sectors.

==== Financial investment in R&D ====
The level of domestic investment in R&D remains low by any standards: 0.11% of GDP in 2007 and 0.14% of GDP in 2013, according to the UNESCO Institute for Statistics. It will be a challenge to bring science to underpin innovation and development, unless the level of investment rises. Achieving this will include leveraging foreign direct investment in areas like electronics, in order to move closer to the higher end of the scale for value-added goods in the global value chain.

== Institutions ==
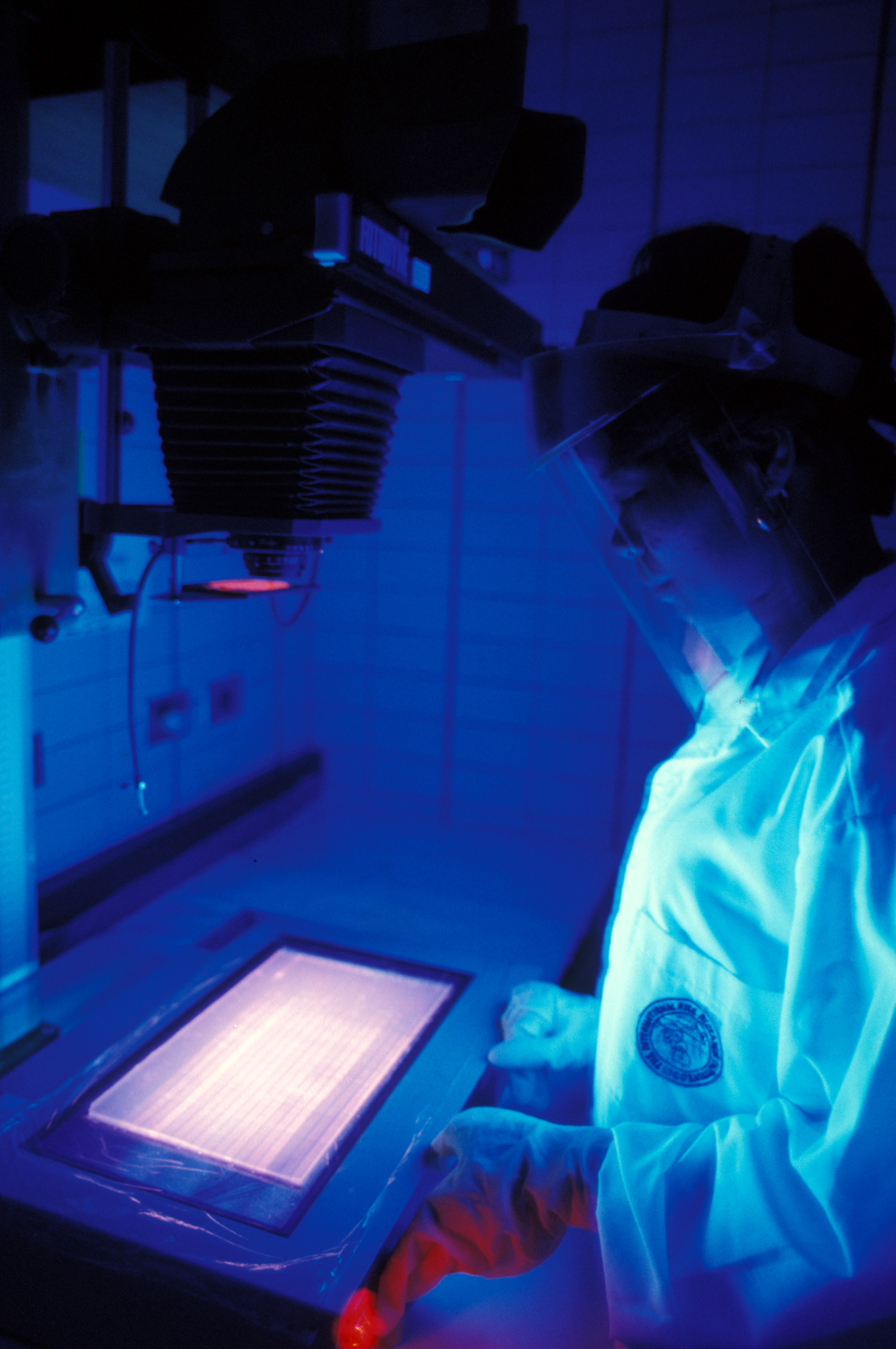
An IRRI researcher studying rice DNA under ultraviolet light.

=== International Research Organizations ===
- International Rice Research Institute (IRRI)
- Irrigated Rice Research Consortium (IRRC)
- Southeast Asian Fisheries Development Center (SEAFDEC)

=== National Government Research Institutions, Bureaus and Attached Agencies ===
Department of Science and Technology (DOST)

- Sectorial Planning Councils
  - Philippine Council for Agriculture, Aquatic, and Natural Resources Research and Development (PCAARRD)
  - Philippine Council for Health Research and Development (PCHRD)
  - Philippine Council for Industry, Energy and Emerging Technology Research and Development (PCIEERD)
- Research and Development Institutes
  - Advanced Science and Technology Institute (ASTI)
  - Food and Nutrition Research Institute (FNRI)
  - Forest Products Research Development Institute (FPRDI)
  - Industrial Technology Development Institute (ITDI)
  - Metal Industry Research and Development Center (MIRDC)
  - Philippine Nuclear Research Institute (PNRI)
  - Philippine Textile Research Institute (PTRI)

Department of Agriculture (DA)

- Bureaus
  - Bureau of Agricultural Research
- Attached Agencies
  - National Fisheries Research and Development Institute
  - Philippine Carabao Center
  - Philippine Center for Postharvest Development and Mechanization
  - Philippine Rice Research Institute
  - Philippine Rubber Research Institute

Department of Energy (DOE)

- Energy Research and Testing Laboratory

Department of Environmental and Natural Resources (DENR)

- Ecosystems Research and Development Bureau
  - Forest Ecosystem Research Division
  - Coastal Zone and Freshwater Ecosystems Research Division
  - Urban Ecosystem Research Division
  - Watershed and Water Resources Research, Development, and Extension Division
  - Urban and Biodiversity Research, Development, and Extension Division
  - Coastal Resources and Ecotourism Research, Development, and Extension Division
  - Agroforestry Research, Development, and Extension Division
  - Forest and Wetland Research, Development, and Extension Division
  - Toxic and Hazardous Waste Research, Development, and Extension Division
- Environmental Management Bureau
  - Environmental Research and Laboratory Services Division

Department of Health (DOH)

- Research Institute for Tropical Medicine (RITM)

=== National Academic, Research and Professional Societies ===
Collegial and Scientific Bodies

- National Research Council of the Philippines (NRCP)
- National Academy of Science and Technology (NAST)

Basic Science

- Crop Science Society of the Philippines
- Transportation Science Society of the Philippines
- Philippine Physics Society
- Samahang Pisika ng Pilipinas
- Samahang Pisika ng Visayas at Mindanao
- Integrated Chemists of the Philippines
- Kapisanang Kimika ng Pilipinas
- Philippine Society for Biochemistry and Molecular Biology
- Philippine Society for Cell Biology
- Mathematical Society of the Philippines
- Computing Society of the Philippines
- Geological Society of the Philippines
- Ecological Society of the Philippines
- Philippine Association of Entomologists
- Philippine Association in Marine Science
- Federation of Institutions in Marine and Freshwater Sciences
- Association of Systematic Biologists of the Philippines
- Philippine Horticultural Society
- Philippine Association of Marine Science
- Philippine Astronomical Society
- Philippine Meteorological Society
- Philippine Corrosion Society
- Philippine Society for Developmental Biology
- Philippine Society for Microbiology

Applied Sciences

- Philippine Society of Mechanical Engineers
- Philippine Institute of Chemical Engineers
- Philippine Institute of Civil Engineers
- Geodetic Engineers of the Philippines
- Society of Metallurgical Engineers of the Philippines
- Society of Naval Architects and Marine Engineers
- Philippine Society of Sanitary Engineers
- Institute of Computer Engineers of the Philippines, Inc.
- Institute of Electronics Engineers of the Philippines, Inc.
- Institute of Integrated Electrical Engineers of the Philippines, Inc.
- Society of Aerospace Engineers of the Philippines
- Philippine Society of Agricultural Engineers
- Philippine Society of Mining Engineers

=== Niche Centers in the Regions for Research and Development (NICER) ===
The following are the NICER programs that are funded by the Department of Science and Technology (Philippines):

List of NICER Programs
| Region | Center | Lead Institution | Affiliate Institution |
|---|---|---|---|
| NCR | Center for Advanced Materials for Clean Energy Technologies Based on Indigenous Materials (CAMCET) | University of Santo Tomas | Mapua University Manila Campus, Adamson University |
| NCR | Environmental Technologies and Compliance Research and Development Center | Polytechnic University of the Philippines | University of the Philippines Diliman, Adamson University |
| NCR | Astronomy Research and Development Center | Rizal Technological University | |
| NCR | Center for Disaster Risk Reduction and Management In Health | University of the Philippines Manila | |
| NCR | Integrated Protein Research and Development Center | Ateneo de Manila University | |
| NCR | Neuro-Robotics Research and Development Center | De La Salle University Main Campus | |
| NCR | Center for Advanced Batteries | Technological Institute of the Philippines Quezon City | University of the Philippines Diliman |
| CAR | Mountain Engineering Research and Development Center | University of the Cordilleras | Saint Louis University (Philippines), Kalinga State University |
| CAR | Potato Research and Development Center | Benguet State University | |
| 01 | Garlic and Other Agri-Food Condiments Research and Development Center | Mariano Marcos State University | |
| 01 | Coastal Engineering Research and Development Center | Don Mariano Marcos Memorial State University | |
| 02 | Electromobility Research and Development Center | Cagayan State University - Carig Campus | University of the Philippines Diliman |
| 02 | Smart Water Infrastructure and Management Research and Development Center | Isabela State University | Cagayan State University, Quirino State University |
| 02 | Citrus Research and Development Center | Nueva Vizcaya State University | |
| 02 | Freshwater Fisheries Research and Development Center | Isabela State University | |
| 03 | Sweet Potato Research and Development Center | Tarlac Agricultural University | |
| 03 | Biomaterials for Diagnostics and Therapeutics Research and Development Center | Angeles University Foundation | |
| 03 | Tamarind Research and Development Center | Pampanga State Agricultural University | |
| 04-A | Vector of Diseases of Public Health Research and Development Center | De La Salle University Laguna Campus | |
| 04-A | Cave Ecosystem Research and Development Center | University of the Philippines Los Baños | |
| 04-A | Lakes Sustainable Research and Development Center | Laguna State Polytechnic University | University of the Philippines Diliman, University of the Philippines Los Baños |
| 04-B | Native Pigs Research and Development Center | Marinduque State University | |
| 05 | Queen Pineapple Research and Development Center | University of Camarines Norte | |
| 05 | Pili Research and Development Center | Bicol University | |
| 06 | Mollusk Research and Development Center | University of the Philippines Visayas | |
| 07 | Biodiversity Research and Development Center | Cebu Technological University | |
| 07 | Environmental Informatics Research and Development Center | University of the Philippines Cebu | |
| 08 | Crustaceans Research and Development Center | Samar State University - Mercedes Campus | |
| 09 | Native Chicken Research and Development Center | Western Mindanao State University | |
| 10 | Bamboo Research and Development Center | Central Mindanao University | |
| 10 | Sustainable Polymers Research and Development Center | Mindanao State University–Iligan Institute of Technology | |
| 10 | Sea Cucumber Research and Development Center | Mindanao State University–Naawan | Mindanao State University - Lanao del Norte Agricultural College, Mindanao State University - Maigo School of Arts and Trades, Mindanao State University–Tawi-Tawi College of Technology and Oceanography, Camiguin Polytechnic State College, University of Science and Technology of Southern Philippines - Panaon Campus |
| 11 | Center for Applied Modeling, Data Analytics, and Bioinformatics for Decision Support Systems In Health | University of the Philippines Mindanao | Malayan Colleges Mindanao |
| 11 | Renewable Energy Research and Development Center | Ateneo de Davao University | |
| 11 | Halal Goat Research and Development Center | Sultan Kudarat State University | |
| 12 | Cacao Research and Development Center | University of Southern Mindanao | |
| 13 | Industrial Tree Plantation Species Research and Development Center | Caraga State University | |
| BARMM | Seaweed Research and Development Center | Mindanao State University–Tawi-Tawi College of Technology and Oceanography | |

== Science education in the Philippines ==
=== High school education ===
==== Philippine Science High School System ====
The Philippine Science High School (PSHS) System is a specialized high school program in the Philippines under the Department of Science and Technology. It offers scholarships to students that are gifted in science and mathematics. High school students are bound by law to major in pure and applied science, mathematics or engineering. PSHS have 12 regional campuses in addition to the main campus. PSHS follows the K-12 basic education program of the government.

==== Regional Science High School System ====
The Regional Science High School (RSHS) System is a specialized high school program in the Philippines under the Department of Education. RSHS have regional campuses and follows the K-12 basic education program of the government.

=== Tertiary education ===
Various universities offers science courses that encompasses the different fields of science.

The Universal Access to Quality Tertiary Education Act of 2017 provides for free tuition and exemption from other fees in public universities and colleges for Filipino students, as well as subsidies for those enrolled in private higher education institutions.

== Challenges ==
=== Lack of technological innovation ===
The Philippines ranked 63rd out of 65 countries in the 2023 Global Finance ranking of the most technologically advanced countries. This decline of two places from the 2022 ranking highlights the country's relatively low performance in internet usage, LTE users, digital competitiveness, and research and development spending compared to other East and Southeast Asian nations.

According to the 2020 report by the World Bank and National Economic and Development Authority (NEDA), the Philippines' efforts to improve its digital infrastructure are hindered by a lack of competition in the telecommunications market and restrictions on foreign investment. Additionally, low bank account ownership, the absence of a national ID, underdeveloped payment infrastructure, and concerns about digital security are limiting the adoption of digital payments.

The Philippines were ranked 53rd in the Global Innovation Index in 2024.

=== Research ===
In 2011, nearly a quarter of the total research personnel in the Philippines were involved in agricultural science. The majority of these researchers were employed by the government, followed by public and private higher education institutions. Private non-profit organizations had a minimal contribution to agricultural research.

Cultural barriers also hinder collaboration between government, academia, and industry in the Philippines. Additionally, there's a lack of policy measures to encourage international R&D collaboration. These factors contribute to the country's limited R&D capacity and inefficient use of R&D budgets.

=== Shortage of STEM graduates ===
A 2020 study by the Philippine Institute for Development Studies (PIDS) predicts a surplus of IT-trained workers by 2025 (which will likely exceed demand by 171,960 positions). However, there will be significant shortages in other STEM fields, particularly in life sciences (13,964 position gaps), engineering (569,903 position gaps), physical sciences (9,689 position gaps), and mathematics and statistics (13,285 position gaps).

== See also ==
- Space program of the Philippines
- Economy of the Philippines

== Sources ==
This article incorporates text from a free content work. Licensed under CC-BY-SA IGO 3.0. Text taken from UNESCO Science Report: towards 2030, 693-731, UNESCO, UNESCO Publishing.
