= Anacleto =

Anacleto is a name. Notable people with the name include:

== Given name ==
- Anacleto Angelini (1914–2007), Italian-born, Chilean businessman
- Juan Anacleto Araneta (1852–1924), pioneer sugar farmer and revolutionary leader during the Negros Revolution
- Anacleto Díaz (1878–1945), Filipino jurist who served as an Associate Justice of the Supreme Court
- Anacleto González Flores (1888–1927), Mexican Catholic layman and lawyer, executed under the presidency of Plutarco Elías Calles
- José Anacleto Montt Goyenechea (1802–1867), Chilean politician and lawyer
- Anacleto Jiménez (born 1967), retired Spanish long-distance runner
- Francisco Anacleto Louca (born 1956), Portuguese economist and politician
- Anacleto del Rosario (1860–1895), leading chemist in the Philippines during the Spanish era

== Surname ==
- Tanya Anacleto (1976–2003), Mozambican swimmer who specialized in sprint freestyle events

== See also ==
- Anacleto, agente secreto (Anacleto, Secret Agent), a Spanish comic character created by cartoonist Manuel Vázquez Gallego in 1964
- Anacleto se divorcia, 1950 Mexican film
- Estádio Anacleto Campanella, an association football stadium in São Caetano do Sul, São Paulo, Brazil
- Anacleto Formation, a geologic formation with outcroppings in the Argentine Patagonian provinces of Mendoza, Río Negro, and Neuquén
- Pope Anacletus
