= Alaminos Goat Farm =

Dairy facility in Alaminos, Philippines

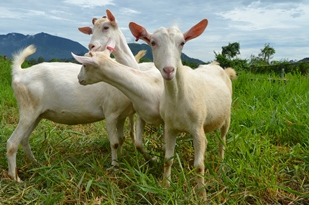
- Saanen goats at the Alaminos Goat Farm
- Interactive map of Alaminos Goat Farm
- Town/City: Alaminos
- Province: Laguna
- Country: Philippines
- Coordinates: 14°03′46.6″N 121°14′15.1″E
- Established: 2005
- Owner: Almeda family
- Produces: Goat-derived dairy products (e.g. milk, cheese)
- Status: Operational

The Alaminos Goat Farm (AGF) is a goat livestock raising and dairy processing facility in Alaminos, Laguna, Philippines.

It was established in 2005 by the Valeriano "Rene" L. Almeda who managed the AGF along with his two sons. He is known for developing the Alaminos Anglo Dairy Line (AADL) and Anglo-Saanen Crosses, a breed of dairy goats which are commercially viable in the wet-dry tropical climate of the Philippines. Almeda produced the crosses by breeding purebred a Saanen doe imported from Australia with an Anglo-Nubian buck imported from the United States.

The facility is known for pioneering the use of Indigofera zollingeriana as goat feeds which was observed to have increased the dairy production of the AGF's herd.

The usage of the shrub for dairy goat feeds later became a subject of a research by the Central Luzon State University. and the Philippine Council for Agriculture, Aquatic, and Natural Resources Research and Development (PCAARRD) named the plant as a recommended green forage for goats. Prior to this innovation, the government has dismissed Indigofera as tough and non-palatable to plants but founder Rene Almeda through his research has found out that this wasn't the case.

The Alaminos Goat Farm primarily produces bottled goat milk, with a smaller portion of the produced output made to make kesong puti (local white cheese) and ice cream. In its early years, the facility mostly served to Chinese-Filipino customers in Binondo, Manila but has since expanded its market. In 2008, the AGF became the first business in the Philippines granted by the country's FDA to sell fresh goat milk in supermarkets. The business' bottled milk are marketed under the "Alaminos Milk Star" brand.
