= Hanumant Singh (roboticist) =

American robotics researcher

- Born: 1965 (age 60–61) (approximate)
- Education: MIT–WHOI Joint Program (Ph.D., 1995)
- Known for: Underwater robotics
- Awards: IEEE OES Lifetime Achievement Award (2022), ICRA Best Student Paper Award
- Scientific career
- Fields: Marine robotics, Field robotics, SLAM, Underwater imaging
- Workplaces: Northeastern University, Woods Hole Oceanographic Institution
- Website: coe.northeastern.edu/people/singh-hanumant/

Hanumant Singh (born c. 1965) is an American robotics engineer, professor, specialising in underwater and field robotics. He is a professor of electrical and computer engineering at Northeastern University, with a courtesy appointment in mechanical and industrial engineering and affiliation with the Khoury College of Computer Sciences. He holds the title of scientist emeritus at Woods Hole Oceanographic Institution (WHOI). Singh serves as chair of the IEEE Ocean Engineering Society's Technology Committee on Autonomous Marine Systems and is the director of the Institute for Experiential Robotics at Northeastern.

Singh developed the SeaBED-class autonomous underwater vehicles (AUVs), including the Seabed, Jaguar, and Puma vehicles, which have been deployed worldwide for scientific exploration in extreme environments including the Arctic Ocean, Antarctic waters, and deep-sea archaeological sites. His robots were the first to be deployed and recovered through ice to the deep ocean (over 3,500 meters) for scientific research.

== Education ==
Singh earned dual Bachelor of Science degrees in electrical engineering and computer science from George Mason University in 1989. He then earned his Ph.D. in 1995 from the MIT–WHOI Joint Program in Oceanographic Engineering. His doctoral research focused on underwater imaging and autonomous vehicle navigation.

== Career ==
After completing his doctorate, Singh joined the technical staff at Woods Hole Oceanographic Institution, where he worked for over two decades in the Deep Submergence Laboratory. At WHOI, he led the development of the SeaBED-class of autonomous underwater vehicles, designed specifically for high-resolution imaging of the seafloor at depths up to 6,000 feet (2,000 meters).

His team also developed the Jaguar and Puma AUVs, which were purpose-built for operations beneath Arctic ice. In 2007, these vehicles became the first robots to be deployed and recovered through ice to the deep ocean (over 3,500 meters) for scientific research, during the Arctic Gakkel Vents Expedition (AGAVE) to search for hydrothermal vents on the Gakkel Ridge near the North Pole.

In 2016, Singh joined Northeastern University as a professor of Electrical and Computer Engineering, with a courtesy appointment in Mechanical and Industrial Engineering and affiliation with Khoury College of Computer Sciences. He directs the Field Robotics Laboratory, which focuses on developing robotic platforms and algorithms for challenging environments. He serves as Director of the Institute for Experiential Robotics.

== Research ==
Singh's research focuses on field robotics with an emphasis on simultaneous localization and mapping (SLAM), imaging, and mapping in marine, polar, and aerial domains.

=== Autonomous underwater vehicles ===
Singh and his team designed and built the SeaBED AUV, a vehicle capable of flying slowly or hovering over the seafloor to collect high-resolution sonar and optical images. The vehicle features a unique twin-hull design that allows for stable imaging operations close to the seafloor. The Seabed-class vehicles, including Jaguar and Puma, have been deployed for hydrothermal vent exploration in the Arctic Ocean, sea ice mapping in Antarctica, coral reef surveys, and deep-water archaeological investigations.

=== Deep-water archaeology ===
Singh's AUV technology has advanced underwater archaeology. In 2005, his SeaBED vehicle surveyed a 4th-century B.C. Greek merchant shipwreck off the island of Chios in the Aegean Sea. The vehicle collected over 7,500 high-resolution images across four dives, creating detailed photomosaics of the ancient wreck site. His team has also contributed to the visual navigation of the RMS Titanic wreck site using SLAM information filters.

=== Climate research ===
Singh's robots are used to study climate change impacts, particularly glacier melt rates in Greenland and ice dynamics in polar regions. His team has traveled to the northernmost Arctic field station to create 3D models of glaciers using autonomous robot boats, cameras, and sensors.

== Awards and honors ==
Singh received the IEEE Oceanic Engineering Society Lifetime Achievement Award in 2022 for lifelong impact in the field of Autonomous Marine Systems. He has also received the ICRA Best Student Paper Award and the King-Sun Fu Memorial Best IEEE Transactions on Robotics Paper Award, both with students.

== Professional service ==
Singh has served as chair of the IEEE Ocean Engineering Technology Committee on Autonomous Marine Systems since 2008 and as organizer of the biennial IEEE AUV Conference since 2008. He has also served as associate editor of the IEEE Journal of Oceanic Engineering (2007–2011) and associate editor of the Journal of Field Robotics (2012–present).

== Selected publications ==
- Kunz, C.; Murphy, C.; Singh, H.; et al. (2009). "Toward extraplanetary under-ice exploration: Robotic steps in the Arctic". Journal of Field Robotics. 26 (4): 411–429. doi:10.1002/rob.20288. hdl:2027.42/62066.
- Bingham, B.; Foley, B.; Singh, H.; et al. (2010). "Robotic Tools for Deep Water Archaeology: Surveying an Ancient Shipwreck with an Autonomous Underwater Vehicle". Journal of Field Robotics. 27 (6): 702–717. doi:10.1002/rob.20350. hdl:2027.42/84394.
- Eustice, R.; Singh, H.; Leonard, J.; Walter, M.; Ballard, R. (2005). Visually navigating the RMS Titanic with SLAM information filters. Robotics: Science and Systems. pp. 57–64.
- Foley, B.P.; Singh, H.; et al. (2009). "The 2005 Chios Ancient Shipwreck Survey: New Methods for Underwater Archaeology". Hesperia. 78 (2): 269–305. doi:10.2972/hesp.78.2.269. hdl:1721.1/50639.
- Kaveti, P.; Giamou, M.; Singh, H.; Rosen, D. (2024). OASIS: Optimal Arrangements for Sensing in SLAM. ICRA. pp. 13818–13824. arXiv:2309.10698.

== See also ==
- Autonomous underwater vehicle
- Woods Hole Oceanographic Institution
- Simultaneous localization and mapping
- Underwater archaeology
