= BPI-DOST Science Awards =

Awards for Philippines-resident Filipino-citizens

Organized in 1989 by the BPI Foundation, Inc., the corporate social responsibility arm of the Bank of the Philippine Islands (BPI), with the Department of Science and Technology (DOST), the BPI-DOST Science Awards recognizes exceptional science and engineering students from partner universities nationwide. These students are individuals whose efforts made them excel in specialized fields of science such as mathematics, physics, engineering, chemistry, biology, and computer science. The awardees are recognized for their potential contributions to industry and nation-building and selected based on their academic and research performance and nomination from the school.

== Selection process ==
The preparation for the awards is a very long and tedious process. Every year in June, the BPI Foundation selects three entries from the ten partner universities, and by July, all the invitations, materials, and all preparations are complete. Acceptance of formal nominations closes in October. By February, all the arrangements for the awarding ceremonies are made.

The foundation gathers the three best entries from the ten partner universities each year. These are Ateneo de Davao University, Ateneo de Manila University, De La Salle University, Saint Louis University, Silliman University, University of the Philippines (Diliman and Los Banes), University of San Carlos, University of Santo Tomas, and Xavier University – Ateneo de Cagayan.

To qualify, the nominee must be a Filipino citizen and a regular student majoring in the following fields: mathematics, physics, chemistry, engineering, computer science, and biology. Additionally, the nominee must have a consistent and outstanding academic, leadership, and research record in their school.

The schools must submit their nominees to the BPI-DOST Science Committee.

The BPI handles the business feasibility of the research, while DOST assesses the scientific aspect. From 30 research projects, the evaluators trim down the entries to 12 semifinalists. DOST again narrows them down to six finalists.

The finalists then undergo an oral evaluation by a joint BPI-DOST panel of experts. Finally, the experts choose the winners of the Best Project of the Year Awards.

The main criteria for judging projects are adherence to scientific soundness, relevance, impact on knowledge advancement, commercial viability, and the study's originality.

Winners get a P200,000 research grant, a P50,000 cash incentive, and a trophy. First- and second-prize winners receive P30,000 and P10,000, respectively, and a trophy each.

All the original 30 outstanding student awardees chosen get P25,000 cash prizes, trophies, and an invitation to work as BPI junior officers.

== Awardees ==
From 1989 to 2004, equal awards were given to the top 3 candidates from each university. Note that awards were first given to candidates from Silliman University and Xavier University in 1990, Ateneo de Davao University in 1994, and Saint Louis University in 1998.

Year	Ateneo de Davao University	Ateneo de Manila University	De La Salle University	Silliman University	St. Louis University	University of the Philippines Diliman	University of the Philippines Los Baños	University of San Carlos	University of Santo Tomas	Xavier University
1989	-	Joselyn M. Concepcion; Elvira P. de Lara; Enrique V. de Leon	Catherine S. J. Andaya; Arnold Martin E. Ablaza; Michael A. Gamo	-	-	Dairene K. Uy; Noel G. Mediodia; Jose Gregorio C. Labanda	Maria Genalin S. de Borja; Edilberto A. Alcanzare^{‡}	June N. Uy; Farley L. Baricuatro; Caroline U. Yu	Novaliza V. Valera; Michael Paul B. Munarriz; Jefferson C. Phi	-
1990	-	Nina Rosario L. Rojas; Neil Raymund Y. Caranto; Virgilio B, Velasco, Jr.	Federico L. Obsequio; Edwin R. Tajanlangit; Robin Michael L. Velasco	Joyce F. Teofilo; Ma. Janette G. Ratilla; Memee G. Puracan	-	Marlon Rosendo H. Daza; Kenrick V. Chua; Christine Chua	Rizaldy P. Scott; Lygia Emily P. Baskinas; Francis L. delos Reyes III	Corazon R. Quimbo; Leila P. Andrino; Carolyn I. Kho	Eva M. Chua; Eugene J. Zshornack; Rosanna Florence S. Pascual	Heraldo L. Cañarejo; Elvy F. Egama; Jeanette B. Fadul
1991	-	Robertson S. Chiang; Ibet Marie Y. Sih; Anthony P. Suarez	John Paul D. Mijares; Rommel O. Salvador; Judes B. Sarmiento	Caesar? B. de Leon; Isidore Perry L. Loo; Maria Althea N. Masangkay	-	Victor Arni D. Sicam; Luis G. Sison; Nilokai N. Leung; Rolando P. Martinez	Jovila A. Marquez; Roy Roberto L. Gerona; Leopold L. Ilag	Roy Y. Andales; Celeste C. Momongan; Jacqueline Hayley C. Sim	Jose H. Bergantin, Jr. Roberto P. Santos; Henry Villanueva	Ellenitta G. Nuñez; Lilibeth L. Perez; Mary Ann R. Deveza
1992	-	Maria Justina L. Bautista; Eloisa N. Kempis; Francis Ted J. Limpoco	Allan D. Ching; Jose Mari L. Jimenez; Maite G. Padua	Allan L. Alcober; Dominic A. Cedeño; Gamaliel N. Garcia	-	Russel Job S. Umandap; Frances Joy O. Uy; Kirk S. Yap	Emmanuel S. Baja; Ma. Xenia U. Garcia; Joseph C. Lim	Dia S. Alibo; Jack Hess Baricuatro; Josefino A. Tapia	Aileen Y. Dujon; Loralie Monina A. Gallo; Wendell A. Salumbides	Aileen D. Gurrea; Zaynab D. Ramirez; Llely E. Yana
1993	-	Cheryl Jasmin T. Manua; Rommel G. Regis; Luis Francisco G. Sarmenta	Michael F. Garcia; Voltaire M. Mistades; Charlie R. Salvador	Heartie Hyacinth E. Almirante; Leodegario P. Rosales; Michael Stanley D. Tan	-	Rowel O. Atienza; Mara Milagros L. del Callar; Joanne Jill T. Olazo	Mark Jesus M. Magbanua; Brian Albert S. Ocfemia; Armand M. Yambao	Lydwena R. Eco; Al A. Mendoza; Peter U. Tan	Cynthia C. Abacan; Jeanne Therese P. Hilario; Robin K. Mitra	Francisco S. Catigbe, Jr. Roel S. Lawagon; Tobias O. Rempillo, Jr.
1994	Janice F. Bacani; Meliza B. Donato; Eduardo Tadeo J. Hagad	Raymond Anthony N. Alimurung; Jonathan John B. Paz; Rommel V. Songco	Yvonne Virginia C. Castro; Jenny G. Du; James L. Lim	M-May A. Luchavez; Marie Teresita E. Patula; Jules C. Silva	-	Jennifer G. Dy; Jose Ernie C. Lope; Agham-Bayan S. Posadas	Aldwin M. Anterola; Hipolito M. Custodio III; Dorothy June M. Hamada	Ermelindo S. Andal, Jr. Neil M. Antiquina; Albert Y. Woo	Rolando Joson Paulino, Jr. Joanne D. Tabora; Liza Marie Ylescupidez	Adler F. Ferrer; Bruno Antonio C. Siaotong; Jennifer N. Sia
1995	Sonny R. Datoy; Melanie C. Labendia; Jeffrey R. Sarmiento	John Erwin S. Lavilles; Joseph Frederick S. Hans; Rico R. Rodriguez	Nelson B. Arboleda, Jr. Ma. Stara C. Cabbab; Zelton R. Santos	Jo-an T. Vera Cruz; James Francis V. Paraon; Anna Marie T. Verzosa	-	Jeffrey G. Chan; Alexander P. Reichert; Karl Leonhard F. Solis	Romeo E. Capuno, Jr. Jonathan Y. Mane; Tricia Mari-len P. Natural	Raoul N. Alo; Lee Marie T. Alvarez; Theresa C. Maxino	Rolan H. Carreon; Jeannette M. Yoingco; Li Li Wong	Michael Y. Calo; Marlon Godwin T. Echalico; Lennie K. Ong
1996	Alaramanav M. Lorejo	Genevieve Go Co; Stephanie Yiu Chua; Rhonald Co Lua	Mabel N. Hong; Carl H. Oliveros; Chimmy C. Young	Mark Jason O. Alcala; Carolyn Joy J. Lumapguid; Jonathan B. Velasco	-	Wilbin S. Chan; Amelita R. Martija; Ignatius Gerardo E. Zarraga	Lourdes Pia H. Lopez; Neilyn P. Ona; Jayson D. Rodriguez	Jerome J. Auza; Fe Ellamae S. Cerico; Mary Ann O. Dizon	Thadeo G. Catacutan; Joseph A. David; Girlie D. Miralles	Ricky S. Eran; Navvab D. Ramirez; Rachelle Marie A. Verdote
1997	Arnold Rex L. Kintanar; Carol B. Aqui; Anna Marie M. Ando	Paolo Augustus S. Aranjuez; Helen U. Co; Rael I. Limbitco	Aimee L. Uy; Favian Nelson S. Ong; Ariel B. Amarillo	Dinah Rose M. Baseleres; Christopher O. Damaso; Sundy Lorence C. Lachica	-	Marc C. Llaguno; Honesto Franz Maximillian A. Nuqui; Cattleya J. Sanchez	Alfonso P. Gonzales III; Krishlex Anthony G. Gruezo; Abdalin L. Esmade	Lullette S. Yau; Mary Chris Y. Damiao; Hazel O. Arceo	Neptali P. Cruz; Christopher de los Santos; Cristy Y. Lao	Tyrene P. Tanaka; Michael Jones L. Sia; Rizaline C. Leonar
1998	Marie Fides U. Antig; Josie May L. de Castro; Rochelle T. Tan	Paul H. Bernardo; Zandro Luis M. Gonzalez; Jason N. Lunas	Leila H. Castañeda; Fernando Rey R. Fernando; Vicente Eduardo G. Velarde	Sheila Lynn M. Catacutan; Jose Leo C. Mission; Rodolfo C. Quibot, Jr.	Marie Antonette T. Jimenez; Ace V. Nolasco; Mariann A. Tada	Jeffrey T. Angeles; Wyant S. Chan; May T. Lim	Prudence Mary P. Marasigan; Glenn A. Neira; Teresita L. Tolentino	Ronn R. Canono; Neal Allen Asensi Castro; Kathleen Jade D. Lim	Anne C. Buenavista; Maria Marilon C. Consulta; Amado O. Tandoc III	Angelita P. Alvarado; Lilibeth U. Cuaresma; Jhody C. Esperante
1999	Maridith D. Lastimoza; Lorelie R. Zapanta; Grace V. Migriño	Anne Margot F. Aaron; Mia Isadora L. Loyola; Erwin M. Sabio	Conrado del Rosario Ruiz, Jr. Edzel Racsa Lapira; Richard Naje Marquez	Juvelyn S. Reniva; Minette L. Natividad; Enriczar T. Tia	Perry A. Agustin, Jr. Ranilo John C. Rabacal; Davidson O. Sevilleja	Cinderella T. Chavez; Angelo Kris G. Marcos; Voltaire Jerome S. Cruz	Aletta Concepcion T. Yñiguez; Hilbert M. Libres; Gilbert E. Tumambac	Reynor M. Buenaflor; Marichel A. Cobcoban; Clare C. Maxino	Ma. Criselda R. Cruz; Nida C. Pangilinan; Noel O. Tecson	Roxanne Rea Piloton; Hyacinth Lee Pituc; John Paul L. Oliveros
2000	Marvin M. Dalian; Mark Henry T. Wee; Antonette S. Meñoza	Richard B. Eden; Catherine Denis R. Jayme; Duncan Bertulfo E. de Lima	Lewellyn V. Celestino; Bryan Christopher N. Que; Jek Charlson S. Yu	Karen Rose R. Yocor; Stanley R. Galanza; Ana Marielle T. Lim	Odette M. Bundang; Mary Libeney D. Canlas; Emerson G. Toquero	Goldy G. Lim; Nikholas G. Toledo; Carlo Amadeo C. Alonzo	Aniway A. Duhaylungsod; Marivi G. Colle; Remil M. Aguda	Wella Marie T. Yu; Rudina Ann D. Pescante; Catherine C. Maxino	Rhandy E. Regulacion; Gardelio P. Malgapo; Donnabel P. Kuizon	Jordan K. Cañete; Edelita N. Remegoso; Basilio M. Cadeliña
2001	Maria Leah Flor A. Alderite; Chito Joseph L. de Castro; Diane Faith D. Sanchez	Roselle R. Ambubuyog; Lito P. dela Rama; Paul Ignatius D. Echevarria	Jan Arman D. Figueroa; Faith Victory A. Mejor; Donna-Zea T. Rosete	Cecille A. Monton; Giselle Ann J. Alcoran; Ritchie D. Ramos	Cheryl D. Agdaca; Jennifer Rose F. Caluza; Lorie Joy P. Mindaro	Mark Ian A. Arcedera; Clarina R. de la Cruz; Joseph Ryan A. Victoria	Irces T. Galvan; Leilani S. del Rosario; Ramil G. Mijares	Juvy Anne R. Agravante; Lecel C. Ando; Giovanni L. Aniñon	Michael G. Baltisoto; Ronald Lance M. Mellow; Valarie S. Ku	Franz Albert G. Go; Mellanie T. Gomez; Noel Peter B. Tan
2002	Christopher M. Jabonero; Mary Glen T. Montales; Ana Karenina R. Pahimalan	John Matthew T. Ng; Paul Dominic B. Olinares; Adrian Wendil R. Serohijos	Richard D. Abalos; Joel L. Panugayan; Tanglaw A. Roman	Vanessa J. Alpeche; Jeffrey Joseph Y. Araula; Raymund Vincent A Piñero	Michael C. Agustin; Rhowella Macay; Alexander Basilio Safran	Marko E. Arciaga; Ericson G. Chua; Karen Kate O. David	Jericho S. Bautista; Rosa Paula O. Cuevas; Mariefel B. Valenzuela	Annely Jane R. Celecia; Emily Joy C. Gobok; Karl Owen L. Suan	Francis D. Castro; Brian S. Go; John Paul B. Lorredo	Rey A. Lumayon; Emil D. Malferrari; Noel Eddie S. Saracanlao
2003	Victor V. Landeta, Jr. Benjie B. Manatad; Ruby Jane S. Uy	Denis Joseph C. Amparo; Sandra Jean V. Chua; Katrina Mona M. Santiago	Jose Eduardo O. Ang; Karen Joy P. Nomorosa; Nicklaus Erick C. Sy	Andres C. Abaño; Aubrey E. Maro; Roda Vee C. Talingting	Daryl C. Abiog; Zander Marius B. Alviar; Michelle D. Zarate	Joselito F. Bartolome, Jr. Kathrina L. Marcelo; Eugene Alvin S. Villar	Joel Niño G. Bugayong; Julius Cesar G. Laban; Robenzon E. Lorenzana	Joni Flor L. Monteveros; Frederick Norman O. Oplado; Philip Maynard O. Ortega	Jaymie Claire G. Ang; Carlo S. Isidro; Abelyn Methanie R. Laurito	Charity Rose B. Absin; Ronald Rey D. Jacalan; John Peter L. Paiso
2004	Carla Mae Suner Jalika Mae F. Rosello	Charlotte Kendra G. Castillo	Beauregard Grant Cheng; Aldrich Seriales; St. Anthony Tiu			Mary Rose D. Italia	Mark Lester L. Altoveros		Warren R. Bacorro Caroline R. Prado Winston R. Wang	

‡ - ?

From 2004 to the present, the format was changed, in which a single winner and 2 runners-up were selected from the top candidates of various universities

Year	Best Project		First Runner-up		Second Runner-up	
Year	Student, Course, and School	Project Description	Student, Course, and School	Project Description	Student, Course, and School	Project Description
2005	Johnny F. Balidion; B.S. Plant Pathology; University of the Philippines Los Baños	Molecular Characterization of Xanthomonas oryzae pv. Pryzae Swings et al., from different Rice-Growing Areas in the Philippines	Sarah Camille M. Concepcion; B.S. Chemistry; University of Santo Tomas	A Preliminary Study on the Potential Anticancer Activity of Turmeric (Curcumin)	Vanessa Grace M. De Villa; B.S. Information Technology; Saint Louis University	Saprophytic Fungi (Aspergillus sp., Penicillium sp., and Trichoderma sp.) As Agents for the Biodegradation of Low Density Polyethylene (LDPE) T-shirt Bags"
2006	Christian Danve M. Castroverde; B.S. Molecular Biology and Biotechnology; University of the Philippines Diliman	Molecular Studies on Type Stains Vibrio campbellii and Vibrio harveyi using Polymerase Chain Reaction and Electroporation	Maydeline P. Que; B.S. Electronics and Communications Engineering; University of the Philippines Diliman	Portable Logging Apnea Monitor	David P. Peralta; B.S. Chemistry; Ateneo de Manila University	Isolation, Purification and Characterization of a 25-35 kDa Glycosidase from Native Ginger Rhizome (Zingiber officinale Roscoe)
2007	Alexander Edward S. Dy; B.S. Biology; University of the Philippines Diliman	Development of a Rapid Detection Kit for Amebiasis Patients through Salivary IgA	Kevin Francis U. Ang; B.S. Biology; University of Santo Tomas	Development of an Immunoassay for the Environment Detection and Monitoring of Blo t? 5 Allergen in House Dust	Paulo Isagani M. Urriza; B.S. Computer Engineering; University of the Philippines Diliman	Implementation of Space-Time Encoders in Field Programmable Gate Arrays (FPGA's)
2008	Carla Gisela Ysabel P. Concepcion; B.S. Molecular Biology and Biotechnology; University of the Philippines Diliman	Cloning of Alcyonium Green Fluorescent Protein (GFP) as a Potential Tracker of Cancer Metastasis	Christina Lora M. Leyson; B.S. Molecular Biology and Biotechnology; University of the Philippines Diliman	Heterologuos Expression of Abaca Bunchy Top Virus (ABTV) Coat Protein (CP) Gene and Production of Antibodies for ABTV Early Detection	Juan Paolo M. Antonio; B.S. Chemical Engineering; University of Santo Tomas	Extraction, Transesterification and Characterization of Bitaog (Calophyllum inophyllum) Seed Oil as Source of Biofuel
2009	Mikhail P. Solon; B.S. Physics; University of the Philippines Diliman	Analysis of Selected Non-linear and Non-local Systems	Stephen Michael H. Co; B.S. Biology; Ateneo de Manila University	Design and Construction of a Synthetic Coconut Cadang Cadang Viroid cDNA	Marvin C. Masalunga; B.S. Biology; University of the Philippines Diliman	Genetic Diversity of Philippines Trichomonas vaginalis Isolates using the 5.8S Ribosomal RNA Gene
2010	Ma. Ivy S. Dela Cruz; B.S. Chemical Engineering; University of the Philippines Los Baños	Removal of Chromium from a local Chrome-Tannery Wastewater by Sodium Sulfite Reduction Coupled with Sodium Hydroxide Precipitation	John Carlo M. Malabad; B.S. ? University of the Philippines Los Baños	Genetic Diversity in Representative Accessions of Cultivated Rice Species Using Grain Quality Candidate Genes through EcoTILLING (Targeting Induced Local Lesions in Genomes)	Michael A. Casas; B.S. Chemistry; Ateneo de Davao University	Optimization of Pectin Extraction from the Peels of Citrus microcarpa (Kalamansi) and Proximate Analysis of the Residue for Selected Parameters
2011	Ahmed C. Abdullah Khayef; B.S. Information Technology; Saint Louis University	Translating Words through Synthesized Sign Language Avatar	Jomuel A. Velandres; B.S. Electrical Engineering; University of the Philippines Los Baños	Selective Recovery of High-purity Silver from a Local Gold smelting Wastewater	Kimberly B. Lucero; B.S. Biology; University of San Carlos	Effects of Two Entomopathogenic Fungi, Beauveria bassiana and Metarhizium anisopliae, on Diamondback Moth (Plutella xylostella) Larvae under Varying Temperatures
2012	Sarah Jane M. Calpo; B.S. Information Technology Saint Louis University	iSketch: A web-enabled Facial composite Illustration System employing the feature-based Approach	Chiliast B. Juan; B.S. Electrical Engineering; University of the Philippines Los Baños	Analysis on the Effect of Various Factors to the Voltage Drop of a Single-wire Earth Return (SWER) Distribution System in Lipa Soil Series	Maxine Andrea T. Garcia; B.S. Life Sciences; Ateneo de Manila University	Identification and Assessment of Bacterial Bioaerosols present in Light Rail Transit (LRT) and Metro Rail Transit (MRT) Stations using Terminal Restriction Fragment Length Polymorphism (T- RFLP) of 16S rRNA Gene
2013	Jann Adriel C. Sy; B.S. Molecular Biology and Biotechnology; University of the Philippines Diliman	a "personalized" system to improve drug metabolism	Jose Paolo P. Aguilar; B.S. Biology; University of Santo Tomas	Remediation of Hexavalent Chromium by Immobilized Microorganisms Coupled with Zero-Valent Iron Nanoparticles (nZVI)	Napoleon Salvador B. Antonio; B.S. Chemistry; Ateneo de Manila University	Towards Affordable Solar Cells: Fabrication of Photovoltaic Devices Incorporating Doped Graphene from Graphite and Doped Carbon from Pyrolyzed Glycerol

From 2016 to 2017, the format was changed, in which 2 winners were awarded Best in Applied Research and Best in Basic Science Research as selected from the top 30 candidates of various competing universities:

Year	Best in Applied Resesarch		Best in Basic Science Research	
Year	Student, Course, and School	Project Description	Student, Course, and School	Project Description
2016	Joselv E. Albano, BS Biology, Ateneo de Davao University	Molecular Detection and Expression of merA and Mercury Reduction by Pseudomonas putida	Jerome Alan S. Japitana, BS Chemistry, University of Santo Tomas	Using Non-Precious Materials in the Development of a Cost-Effective Cathode Catalyst for Direct Ethanol Fuel Cells (Best Project)
2017	Ervin Luis M. Jayag, BS Chemical Engineering, University of Santo Tomas	Optimization of Co-Catalyst Loading Parameters and Design of a Photocatalytic Reactor for Hydrogen Production Using Modified Titanium Dioxide and Visible Light Irradiation	Sheena Gumantay, BS Biology, University of Santo Tomas	Using RNA interference to silence the viral gene VP9 which impairs the white spot syndrome virus (Best Project)
