= Khoury College of Computer Sciences =

Unit of Northeastern University in Boston, US

Northeastern University Khoury College of Computer Sciences
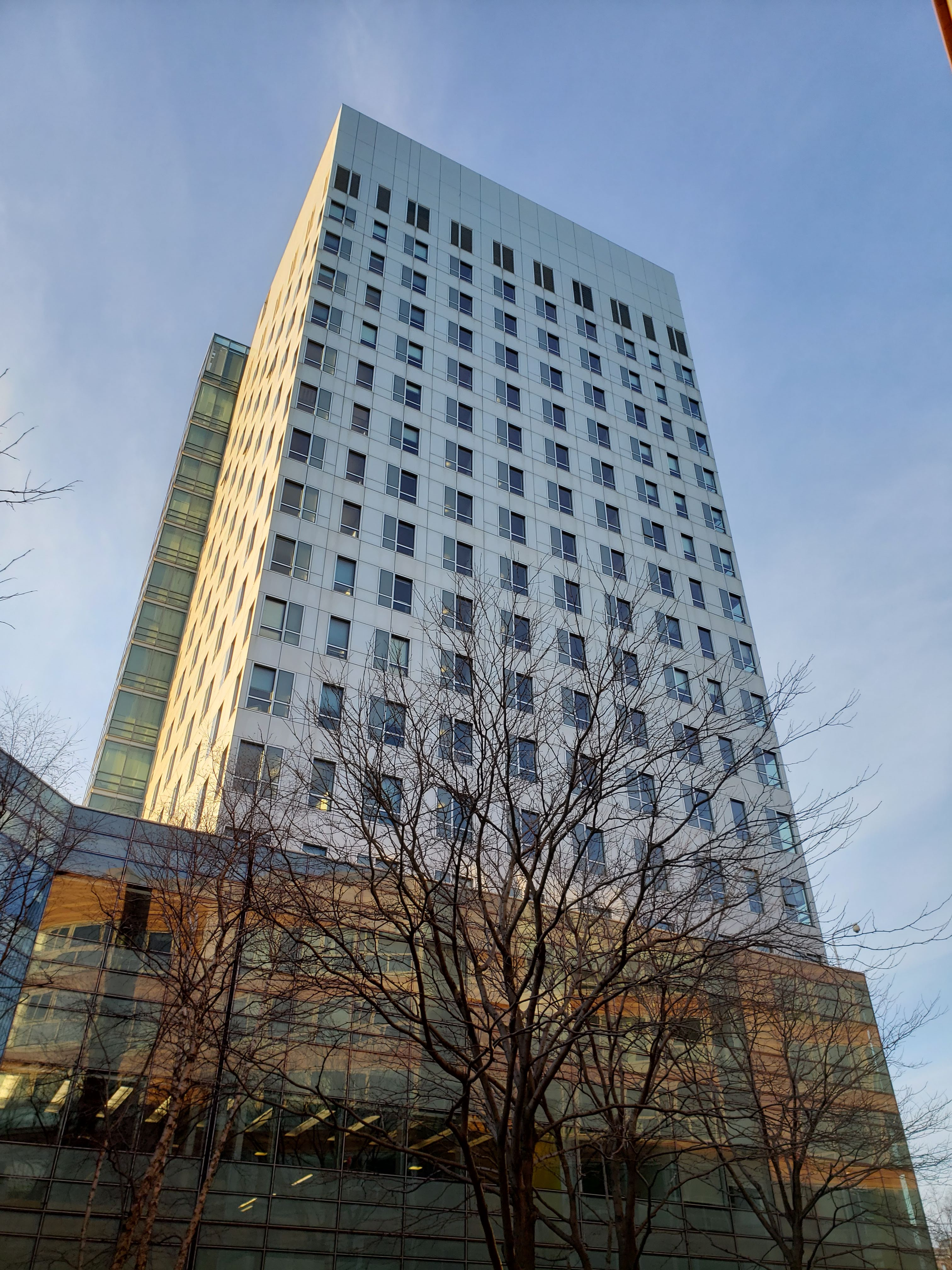
- The college housed in West Village H building
- Type: Private
- Established: 1982
- Parent institution: Northeastern University
- Dean: Elizabeth Mynatt
- Faculty: 65
- Undergraduates: 4,339
- Postgraduates: 4,247
- Doctoral students: 326
- Location: Boston, Massachusetts, United States; 42°20′19.5″N 71°5′31.6″W
- Website: khoury.northeastern.edu

The Khoury College of Computer Sciences is the computer science school of Northeastern University. It was the first college in the United States dedicated to the field of computer science when it was founded in 1982. In addition to computer science, it specializes in data science, cybersecurity, and artificial intelligence. Khoury College offers Bachelor of Science (BS), Bachelor of Arts (BA), Master of Science (MS), and Doctor of Philosophy (PhD) degrees in computer science, as well as undergraduate and graduate degrees in interdisciplinary, computer-related fields. In fall 2025, some 4,339 undergraduate students, 4,247 master's students, and 326 doctoral candidates were enrolled in the college across nine Northeastern campus locations.

Campus locations include Boston, Massachusetts (both Northeastern University’s and Khoury College’s oldest location); Arlington, Virginia; London, UK; Miami, Florida; Oakland, California; Portland, Maine; Seattle, Washington; San Jose, California; and Vancouver, Canada. Master’s programs are available at eight locations, and undergraduate degrees are offered full-time in Boston and Oakland, with semester learning opportunities in Seattle, London, and Oakland.

In 2025, Khoury College's graduate program in computer science was ranked 27th in US News & World Report’s list of the "Best Computer Science Graduate Schools." The publication also ranked the graduate program 18th on its list of "Best Programming Language Programs." Khoury College is ranked 11th (tied with Stanford) in CSRankings, a ranking of computer science institutions based on faculty publications at selective conferences.

== History ==
Between 1979 and 1981, Northeastern organized a blue-ribbon panel of educators and experts, including industry leaders from Bell Labs, University of California, Berkeley, Massachusetts Institute of Technology (MIT) and the Digital Equipment Corporation, to develop a plan to advance education and research in the emerging field of computer science. In 1982, the university formally established the College of Computer Science (CCS), the first US college devoted to computer science and the first new college at Northeastern in 17 years.

Paul Kalaghan, director of Academic Computer Services, was named its first dean. The college was initially housed in Knowles-Volpe Hall, now known as the Asa S. Knowles Center, with 11 faculty members and 239 first-year students. Graduate degree programs were added in 1984. A year later, the college moved into the former Botolph Building, one of the oldest structures on campus, which reopened as the David and Margaret Fitzgerald Cullinane Hall.

In 2004, the college moved into the newly constructed West Village H building, which consists of a six-story building and a 16-story tower containing the Khoury College of Computer Sciences and on-campus undergraduate housing.

=== Naming donation ===
On December 16, 2018, Northeastern University announced a $50 million gift from alumnus and board trustee Amin Khoury to "support all aspects of the college's future focus." The College of Computer and Information Science was then renamed the Khoury College of Computer Sciences.

== Northeastern Deans of Computer Science ==
- Elizabeth Mynatt, 2022–present
- Alan Mislove (interim), 2021–2022
- Carla Brodley, 2014–2021
- Larry Finkelstein, 1994–2014
- Cynthia Brown, 1990–1994
- Alan Selman (acting), 1988–1990
- Paul Kalaghan, 1982–1988

== Academic programs ==
=== Undergraduate degrees ===
The undergraduate computer science program offers both Bachelor of Science and Bachelor of Arts degrees. While both require a core curriculum of computer science, mathematics, science, and humanities coursework, BA candidates are required to take more humanities coursework than BS candidates. The BS is thus the more technical of the two degrees, with the BA aimed at giving students a social science context with which to frame their understanding of computer science.

Khoury College offers the following core undergraduate degrees:

- BS in Computer Science
- BA in Computer Science
- BS in Artificial Intelligence
- BS in Cybersecurity

==== Combined majors and accelerated master's programs ====
Khoury College offers 60 combined majors that pair computer science, artificial intelligence, and cybersecurity with noncomputing disciplines to create hybrid degree programs with unique curricula. Khoury College is the top CS college for combined major offerings, with 62% of undergraduates pursuing a combined degree.

Northeastern and Khoury College also offer PlusOne accelerated master’s programs in which up to 16 credits (four courses) count toward both a bachelor’s and a master’s degree. Students can then take four master-level electives to complete the program.

=== Graduate degrees ===
Khoury College offers both Master of Science and doctoral degrees.

==== Direct-entry master's degrees ====
Khoury College offers the following master's degrees:

- MS in Computer Science
- MS in Artificial Intelligence
- MS in Cybersecurity
- MS in Data Science
- MS in Complex Network Analysis (interdisciplinary)
- MS in Extended Realities (interdisciplinary)
- MS in Game Science and Design (interdisciplinary)
- MS in Health Informatics (interdisciplinary)
- MS in Internet of Things (interdisciplinary)
- MS in Robotics (interdisciplinary)
- MS in Statistics (interdisciplinary)
- MS in Statistics Connect (interdisciplinary)

Align master’s degrees

Established to broaden access to technology careers for students from nontechnical backgrounds, the Align master’s programs are offered across eight Northeastern campus locations and online, and in the following disciplines: computer science, cybersecurity, and artificial intelligence. The full-time program typically requires 2.5 years to complete and begins with bridge courses to establish foundational knowledge, followed by graduate-level coursework and paid co-op or internship experiences.

==== PhD program ====
The PhD program prepares students for research careers in government, industry, or academia. Candidates are given a maximum of five years to complete this coursework and their doctoral thesis. Khoury College offers four PhD programs:

- PhD in Computer Science
- PhD in Network Science
- PhD in Cybersecurity
- PhD in Personal Health Informatics

== Research ==
Khoury College conducts extensive research across multiple domains of computer science, with a mission to push the boundaries of computational technology and apply research discoveries to real-world challenges. The college emphasizes interdisciplinary collaboration and practical applications of computer science research.

=== Overview and scope ===
Khoury College researchers engage in wide-ranging work spanning theoretical computer science, applied systems, and human-centered design. In fiscal year 2024, the college submitted 132 research proposals requesting $94.2 million in funding, maintained 184 active grants, and supported 88 faculty members with active research funding. The college has been particularly successful in securing NSF CAREER awards, with numerous early-career faculty receiving this prestigious recognition through the years.

Research at Khoury College operates through several specialized institutes and centers, including the Cybersecurity and Privacy Institute, the Network Science Institute, the Center for Generative AI, the Center for Inclusive Computing, and the Institute for Experiential Robotics. These centers facilitate collaboration between academic, industry, and government partners.

=== Major research areas ===
- Algorithms and theory
- Artificial intelligence
- Computational biology
- Computer science education
- Data management
- Data science
- Data visualization
- Formal methods
- Games
- Human-centered computing
- Machine learning
- Natural language processing
- Network science
- Personal health informatics
- Programming languages
- Robotics
- Software engineering
- Systems and networking

=== Notable projects and initiatives ===
The National Deep Inference Fabric represents a major NSF investment to build national-scale computing infrastructure for AI research, enabling scientists to investigate the inner workings of large-scale AI systems. Professor David Bau serves as the lead principal investigator for this initiative.

The college's research portfolio includes work on creating new tools for mobility data science, developing privacy-preserving techniques for GPS and fitness tracking data, and exploring how formal methods research can enhance data security. Faculty are also investigating the role symmetry can play in developing data-efficient, trustworthy deep learning models.

Professor Alan Mislove served an 18-month appointment at the White House Office of Science and Technology Policy, contributing to AI policy development and work on algorithmic fairness, bias, and data privacy.

=== Research impact and recognition ===
Khoury College faculty regularly publish in top-tier conferences and journals across computer science. Recent recognition includes the 2024 CMU Cylab Distinguished Alumni Award, multiple Caspar Bowden PET Awards for privacy-enhancing technologies, and numerous best paper awards at major conferences including CHI, HCOMP, and the Internet Measurement Conference.

The college maintains strong partnerships with industry leaders, facilitating collaborative research projects and providing students with experiential learning opportunities through co-ops and internships. This emphasis on real-world applications, combined with an ethos of interdisciplinary work both within the college and beyond, reflects Khoury College’s focus on collaborative research that addresses practical challenges.

== Experiential learning/cooperative education ==
Khoury College participates in Northeastern University's cooperative education program, which has operated since 1909 and is ranked first nationally by U.S. News & World Report. The program allows students to gain professional work experience before graduation through full-time, paid positions with industry partners.

=== Undergraduate co-op program ===
Undergraduate students typically complete one or two co-ops during their time at Khoury College. During the 2024–25 academic year, the college partnered with 650-plus employers across various industries. Traditional co-ops consist of months-long, full-time professional work experiences, although the college also offers alternative models.

Major co-op employers for undergraduates include Northeastern University itself, Wayfair, Chewy, and technology companies such as Amazon and Meta. According to employer evaluations from the 2024–25 academic year, 94% of co-op employers indicated they would hire their co-op student full-time if given the opportunity.

=== Graduate co-op program ===
Graduate students at Khoury College can participate in co-ops after completing two academic semesters with a minimum 3.0 GPA. Graduate co-ops typically last either six to eight months or three to four months, providing master's students with opportunities to apply classroom knowledge in professional settings before graduation.

Top graduate co-op employers during the 2024–25 academic year included Amazon, Meta, Fidelity Investments, Tesla, Amazon Web Services, TikTok, Google, and Adobe. The program serves both domestic and international students, with international students able to participate through Curricular Practical Training authorization.

== Student groups and organizations ==
Undergraduate and graduate students participate in a diverse array of student clubs and organizations across Northeastern University's global campus network. These student clubs provide opportunities to build knowledge, develop professional skills, network, and form communities based on shared interests and identities.

The college's undergraduate clubs encompass a wide range of focus areas, including technical specializations such as artificial intelligence, cybersecurity, and blockchain technology; professional development through groups focused on entrepreneurship, product management, and specific career paths; and diversity and inclusion initiatives supporting underrepresented groups in computing. Students can also participate in competitive teams, social clubs, and community service organizations that use technology to benefit local communities.

Graduate student organizations are available at multiple campus locations including Boston, Arlington, Miami, Oakland, Portland, Seattle, Silicon Valley, and Vancouver, as well as online. These clubs provide networking opportunities, cultural engagement, professional development, and social activities tailored to the graduate student experience. Many clubs focus on building inclusive communities while others emphasize hands-on technical projects, research collaboration, or industry-specific skill development.

== Key people ==
- Timothy W. Bickmore, Professor
- Carla Brodley, Professor, Dean of Inclusive Computing, Northeastern University
- William Clinger, Associate Professor Emeritus
- David Lazer, Distinguished Professor
- Albert-László Barabási, Distinguished Professor
- Alessandro Vespignani, Distinguished Professor
- Elizabeth Mynatt, Dean
- Tina Eliassi-Rad, inaugural Joseph E. Aoun Professor
