= Timothy W. Bickmore =

American computer scientist

- Education: Arizona State University (BSE, MS); Massachusetts Institute of Technology (PhD)
- Known for: Relational agents, virtual health counseling agents
- Awards: Stanford/Elsevier top 2% most-cited scientists
- Scientific career
- Fields: Human–computer interaction, conversational agents, health informatics, natural language processing
- Workplaces: Northeastern University; Boston University School of Medicine; MIT Media Lab
- Website: relationalagents.com

Timothy W. Bickmore is an American computer scientist who is a Professor in the Khoury College of Computer Sciences at Northeastern University. He is known for his research on relational agents — computer agents designed to build long-term social-emotional relationships with their users — and their application in health education, health behaviour change, and palliative care. He served as Associate Dean for Research at the Khoury College from 2017 to 2022.

== Education ==
Bickmore received his Bachelor of Science and Engineering in Computer Systems Engineering (summa cum laude) and his Master of Science in Computer Science from Arizona State University in 1985 and 1986, respectively. He earned his PhD in Media Arts and Sciences from the MIT Media Lab at the Massachusetts Institute of Technology in 2003, where he studied under Rosalind Picard (Affective Computing) and Justine Cassell (Gesture and Narrative Language). His doctoral thesis, Relational Agents: Effecting Change through Human-Computer Relationships (2003), introduced the concept of relational agents.

== Career ==
Before entering academia, Bickmore worked as a research scientist at the Lockheed Artificial Intelligence Center (1986–1990), as a project engineer at Aerojet (1990–1994), and as a consulting scientist at the Fuji Xerox Palo Alto Research Lab (1995–1998). He then joined the MIT Media Lab as a research assistant and later postdoctoral researcher.

Following his doctorate, Bickmore was an assistant professor of medicine at the Boston University School of Medicine (2003–2005). He joined Northeastern University in 2005 as an assistant professor, was promoted to associate professor in 2011 and to full professor in 2016. He served as Associate Dean for Research at the Khoury College of Computer Sciences from 2017 to 2022. He directs the Relational Agents Group at Northeastern.

== Research ==
=== Relational agents ===
Bickmore coined the term "relational agents" in his 2003 MIT doctoral thesis to describe computational artifacts designed to build and maintain long-term social-emotional relationships with their users. Unlike conventional chatbots, relational agents use speech, gaze, gesture, intonation, and other nonverbal modalities to emulate face-to-face conversation, and are designed to remember past interactions in order to build therapeutic alliance with users over time.

=== Virtual nurse and hospital discharge ===
Bickmore developed a bedside virtual nurse agent (named "Elizabeth" or "Louise") that explains hospital discharge instructions to patients through simulated face-to-face conversation. The system was designed particularly for patients with low health literacy, who represent approximately one-third of U.S. adults. The virtual nurse was demonstrated to Kathleen Sebelius, the United States Secretary of Health and Human Services, by the director of the Agency for Healthcare Research and Quality in 2009. The technology was licensed to a commercial company for deployment in hospitals.

=== End-of-life and palliative care chatbot ===
In collaboration with Boston Medical Center physician Michael Paasche-Orlow, Bickmore developed a tablet-based chatbot for palliative care that helps terminally ill patients with end-of-life planning, including topics such as wills, funeral arrangements, and spiritual guidance. The chatbot's dialogue accounts for six religions, atheism, and secular humanism, and was developed in consultation with hospital chaplains. The project received over $1 million in funding from the National Institutes of Health and was covered by CNBC, New Scientist, CNET, Vice, and the Daily Mail.

=== COVID-19 vaccine promotion ===
Bickmore received NIH funding to develop a virtual nurse agent named "Clara" to promote COVID-19 vaccine uptake among Black communities in Boston, partnering with the Black Ministerial Alliance of Greater Boston. The agent was designed as a Christian virtual health counsellor who builds trust through personal disclosure and remembers details about patients' lives across interactions.

=== Clinical trials ===
Bickmore's relational agents have been deployed as virtual nurses, lactation consultants, exercise coaches, preconception health counsellors, and genetic counsellors in over 25 clinical trials with more than 4,000 participants. His work includes a randomised controlled trial published in The Lancet Digital Health demonstrating the use of a conversational agent to improve preconception health among young African American women.

== Selected publications ==
- Bickmore, Timothy (2003). Relational Agents: Effecting Change through Human-Computer Relationships (PhD). Massachusetts Institute of Technology.
- Bickmore, Timothy; Picard, Rosalind (2005). "Establishing and Maintaining Long-Term Human-Computer Relationships". ACM Transactions on Computer-Human Interaction. 12 (2): 293–327.
- Cassell, Justine; Bickmore, Timothy (2000). "External Manifestations of Trustworthiness in the Interface". Communications of the ACM. 43 (12): 50–56.
- Jack, Brian; Bickmore, Timothy; et al. (2020). "Improving the health of young African American women in the preconception period using health information technology: a randomised controlled trial". The Lancet Digital Health. 2 (9): e475–e485. PMID 33328115.
