= Carla Brodley =

Computer scientist

- Education: McGill University (1985); University of Massachusetts Amherst (1994)
- Awards: AAAI Fellow (2014); ACM Fellow (2016); AAAS Fellow (2020)
- Scientific career
- Fields: Computer Science; Machine Learning
- Workplaces: Northeastern University; Tufts University; Purdue University
- Doctoral students: Jennifer Dy
- Website: carla.khoury.northeastern.edu

Carla E. Brodley is a computer scientist specializing in machine learning. Brodley is a Fellow of the ACM, the Association for the Advancement of Artificial Intelligence (AAAI), and the American Association for the Advancement of Science (AAAS). She is the Dean of Inclusive Computing at Northeastern University, where she serves as the Executive Director for the Center for Inclusive Computing and holds a tenured appointment in Khoury College of Computer Sciences. Brodley served as dean of Khoury College from 2014-2021. She is a proponent for greater enrollment of women and under-represented minorities in computer science.

== Education and career ==
Brodley is a 1985 graduate of McGill University. At McGill, she initially chose to major in English, quickly switching to economics, but switched again to a double major in mathematics and computer science after taking and enjoying a computer programming course as a sophomore. After working as a consultant and computer programmer in Boston, she returned to graduate school, initially planning only to work for a master's degree in artificial intelligence, but continuing there for a Ph.D. under the supervision of Paul Utgoff.

After finishing her doctorate in 1994, she joined the electrical engineering faculty of Purdue University School of Electrical and Computer Engineering. She moved from Purdue to Tufts University in 2004, and became chair of the department of computer science at Tufts from 2010 to 2013, also holding an affiliation with the Clinical and Translational Science Institute at Tufts Medical Center. She moved again from Tufts to Northeastern in 2014.

== Recognition ==
Brodley was named a Fellow of the Association for Computing Machinery in 2016 "for applications of machine learning and for increasing participation of women in computer science". Brodley is also a fellow of the Association for the Advancement of Artificial Intelligence (AAAI), and the American Association for the Advancement of Science (AAAS).
