= Anacleto del Rosario =

Filipino chemist (1860–1895)

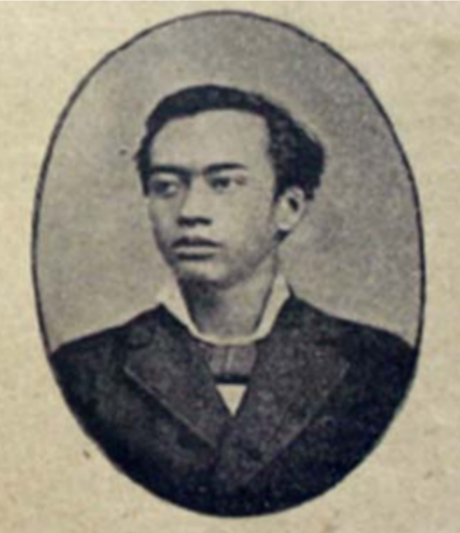
- Del Rosario in Crónica de las Ciencias Médicas de Filipinas, c. 1890s
- Born: July 13, 1860; Santa Cruz, Manila, Captaincy General of the Philippines
- Died: May 2, 1895 (aged 35)
- Education: Ateneo de Manila University, University of Santo Tomas
- Occupations: chemist, notably in Biochemistry and Analytical Chemistry, pharmacist
- Spouse: Valeriana Valdezco
- Children: 3, Jose del Rosario; Luis del Rosario; Rosa del Rosario
- Parents: Eugenio del Rosario (father); Casimira del Rosario (nee. Sales) (mother)

Anacleto del Rosario y Sales (July 13, 1860, Santa Cruz, Manila – May 2, 1895) was a leading chemist in the Philippines during the Spanish era in Philippine history. Regarded as the "Father of Philippine Science and Laboratory", del Rosario invented the formula for producing a pure kind of alcohol from tuba in a nipa palm. This formula won for del Rosario the first prize during the World Fair in Paris, France in 1889. Del Rosario extracted castor oil from the palma christi, literally the "palm of Christ" (castor bean), a native plant in the Philippines.

Anacleto del Rosario was born in Santa Cruz, Manila. Born to a native Filipino family, he gained high honors in Ateneo de Manila University and University of Santo Tomas, from Ateneo de Manila University he met Dr. José Rizal. He was known to be the first homegrown scientist of the Philippines by becoming the first Director of the Manila City laboratory. His position lead him to establish the beginnings of Science and technology in the Philippines by increasing the standards for quality control on essential items and investigation of natural resources. He married once and had three children.

== Early life ==
Anacleto del Rosario was born on July 13, 1860, at Santa Cruz, Manila to Eugenio del Rosario and Casimira del Rosario (née. Sales). He was the sixth of eleven children in the family. His father was a cordon manufacturer for the Spanish colonial army in the Philippines. His father died when he was five years old. The del Rosario family lived in the district of Quiotan, now named Sales after the maternal family name. The family relied on selling fruits and vegetables for a living. His mother Casimira taught the young Anacleto on how to read the alphabet.

== Education ==
Anacleto del Rosario first studied in a private institution, and his rather stern relative was his guardian who supervised his schooling. In return for the tutelage of his guardian, Anacleto had to wash the bottles in his Aunt's drugstore. Accounts from his son Jose relates that he escapes through the window of the bathroom of their own home just to go out and borrow books from classmates. His uncle, a lawyer, also supervised his schooling.

At the age of 13, he enrolled into Ateneo Municipal as a third-year student. His intellect and diligence led him to earn the respect of his own schoolmates. He joined the Congregacion Mariana, a religious organization which only allows students of high moral and academic standing to join. He also became the president of the said organization. During this time he met José Rizal and he became acquainted with him. During his years in Ateneo, he made and sold electric bells, household fixtures, and toys to earn money. He gained his Bachelor in Arts degree on April 1, 1876, with the highest honors (Nota Maxima).

At the age of 16, along with José Rizal, he enrolled into University of Santo Tomas. He faced financial problems while studying in the University of Santo Tomas so he enrolled again into the Ateneo. He studied land surveying and took part-time jobs. He received a degree in land surveying in 1881. He surveyed large tracts of land especially from affluent families such as the Aranetas and the Lopezes. Using the money earned from surveying, he decided to buy a microscope and books relating to microbiology. At the age of 22, he received a degree in pharmacy with the highest honors (sobresaliente), and a year later a Master of Science degree in pharmacy (Licenciatura). Other degrees include a preparatory course in Natural History (1876–1877), first year in Plant Pharmaceutical Matter (1877–1878), second year in Animal and Mineral Pharmaceutical Matter (1878–1879), third year in Chemical-inorganic Pharmacy (1879–1880), and fourth year in Chemical-organic Pharmacy (1880–1881). All of these except his first year has the highest honors. His first year has a high honors (notable).

== Early career ==
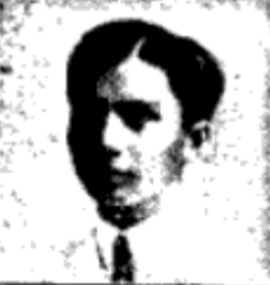
Photo of del Rosario depicted in a 1913 publication of Philippine Education

Anacleto del Rosario first engaged in the pharmaceutical business. He first partnered with Don Enrique Perez and Don Benito Legarda in the importation and selling of pharmaceutical products. He started his own pharmacy from selling his own share in the partnership and named the pharmacy Farmacia A. del Rosario on calle San. Fernando, Binondo, (now San. Fernando St.). He then became a chemist at the LA Rosario distillery. During the outbreak of cholera in June 1882, under Fernando Primo de Rivera, he was assigned to the Lazareto de Mariveles. This piqued his interest in bacteriology and made extensive studies about the causes of cholera. Robert Koch isolated the Vibrio cholerae bacteria two years later in 1884.

On June 17, 1882, he was appointed as a pharmacist member (Vocal farmaceutico) of the Commission of Health. He also became a member of the Junta Inspectora de Bilibid on March 11, 1883. Two years later, it was named the Farmacetuco municipal de Binondo.

== Directorship of the Manila City Laboratory and later career ==
=== Directorship of Manila City Laboratory ===
In 1886, Anacleto del Rosario took the examinations at the Manila Mint (Casa de Moneda). There he passed a thesis in analytical chemistry describing the analytical procedures of a volumetric kind, and the apparatus used in a laboratory. This gave him the directorship of Laboratorio Municipal de la cuidad de Manila (Municipal Laboratory of the City of Manila) in 1887.

Using his position as the director, he studied the medical waters in San Miguel, Bulacan, Los Baños, Laguna, Mabitac, Laguna, and Albay. During this time, he investigated over a hundred springs in Luzon alone. This lead him to publish two works regarding the study of mineral water in Luzon. Both the Memoria descriptive de los manantiales minero-medicinales de la Isla de Luzon (1890) and the Estudio descriptivo de Alguanos manantiales de Filipinas (1893) were published during his time as the director.

=== Later career ===
Anacleto del Rosario worked as a chemist at the Ayala distillery. In the distillery, he discovered a process on how to purify alcohol and how to make nipa wine acquire the taste similar to Spanish wine. This discovery lead him to win the awards at the 1888 and 1889 World's fair.

== Final Years and Death ==
=== Final Years ===
Anacleto del Rosario became secretary of the Junta Inspectora y Administradora del colegio de Farmaceuticos in 1891. The next year, he became the secretary of the Chamber of Commerce in Manila.

After this he tried to do a more thorough study of the chemical composition of the essential oil of ilang-ilang.

=== Death ===
Anacleto del Rosario died on May 2, 1895, due to Tuberculosis.

== Marriages and Children ==
He married into Valeriana Valdezco even if her parents initially disapproved of him due to his financial condition.

He had three children altogether

- Jose del Rosario, a chemist
- Luis del Rosario, S.J., bishop then archbishop of Zamboanga
- Rosa del Rosario

== Personal life ==
He was described in his youth as a gentle and sweet person in deposition. He was a devout Catholic. In his later years, he was described as an enthusiastic person that wanted to share his experiences to the public.

== Written works ==
- "El Analysis Quimico de las Aguas Minerales," in La Oceania Española (November 8, 14, 15, 1885)
- "La Leche de Caraballa," ibid., (March 28, 1885)
- Los Olores del Pasig (Manila 1886)
- Apuntes para el Estudio de un Nuevo Entófito (Manila 1887)
- Resultado de los Analysis Micro-quimicos en la Provincia de Manila (1888)
- "Contribución al Estudio de la Esencia de Ilang-ilang," in Revisita Farmaceutica de Filipinas, (January 3, March 3, and April 3, 1893)
- "El Guano de Filipinas," ibid., (May 3, 1893)
- Analysis de la Orina en el Beri-beri (1895)
- La Leche fe Caraballa (1895)

== See also ==
- José Rizal
- Trinidad Pardo de Tavera
- León María Guerrero (botanist)
- Science and technology in the Philippines
