= Philippine Council for Agriculture, Aquatic, and Natural Resources Research and Development =

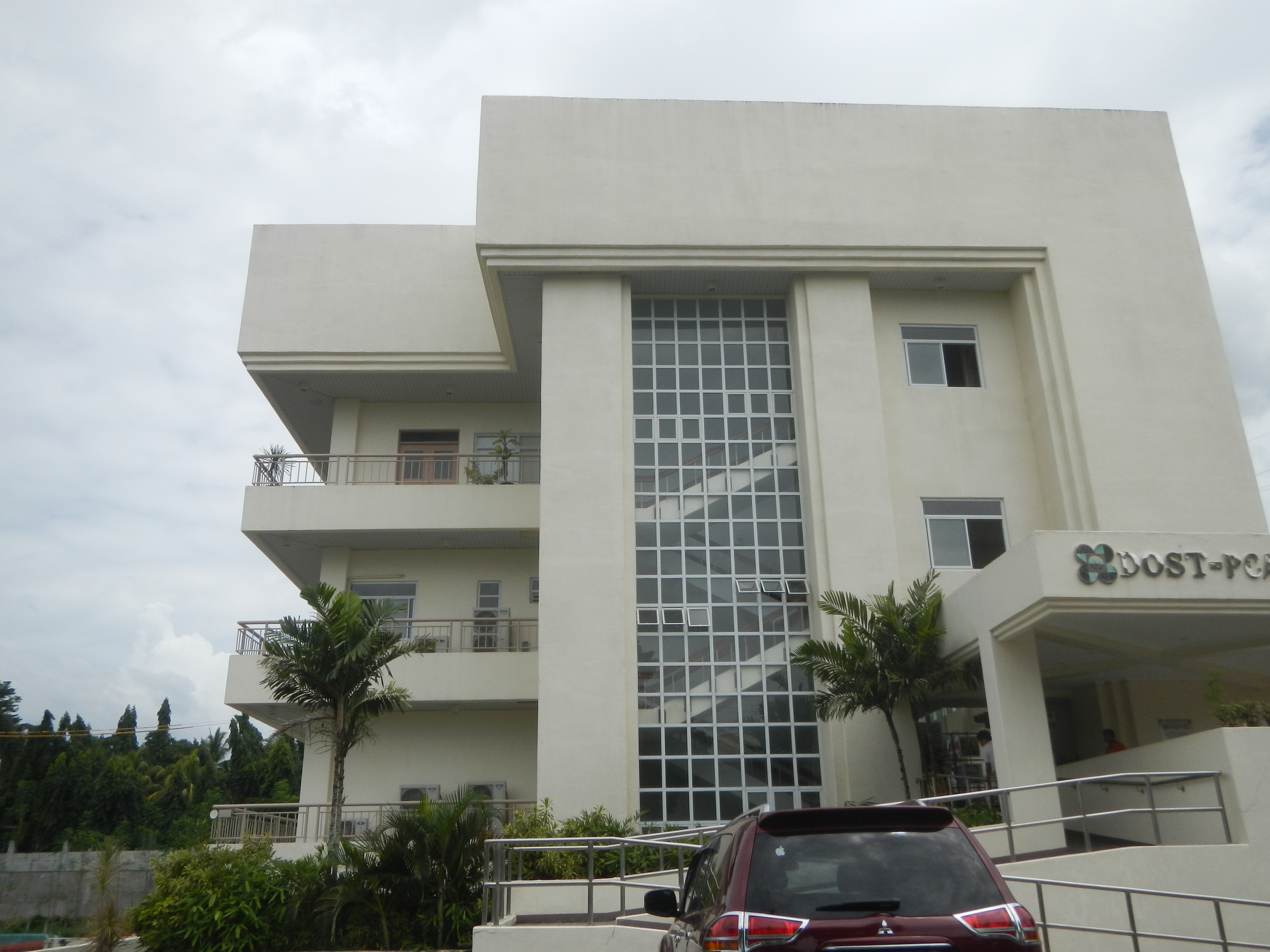

Agency overview
- Formed: 10 November 1972
- Headquarters: Paseo de Valmayor, Brgy. Timugan, Los Baños, Laguna
- Employees: 210 (2024)
- Annual budget: ₱1.44 billion (2021)
- Agency executive: Dr. Reynaldo V. Ebora, Executive Director
- Parent agency: Department of Science and Technology
- Website: www.pcaarrd.dost.gov.ph

The Philippine Council for Agriculture, Aquatic, and Natural Resources Research and Development (PCAARRD; Filipino: Sanggunian ng Pilipinas para sa Pananaliksik at Pagpapaunlad ng Agrikultura, Akwatiko, at Likas na Yaman) is a council of the Department of Science and Technology of the Philippines government.

The council aims to help national research and development efforts in agriculture, forestry, and natural resources of the Philippines. It does so by assisting with planning strategies, formulating policies, and programs for development. It is the body responsible nationally for programming and allocating government and external funds for R&D, and monitors and evaluates these programs for effectiveness.
