= Kalinga State University =

Public university in Kalinga province, Philippines

- Pamantasang Pangestado ng Kalinga (Filipino)
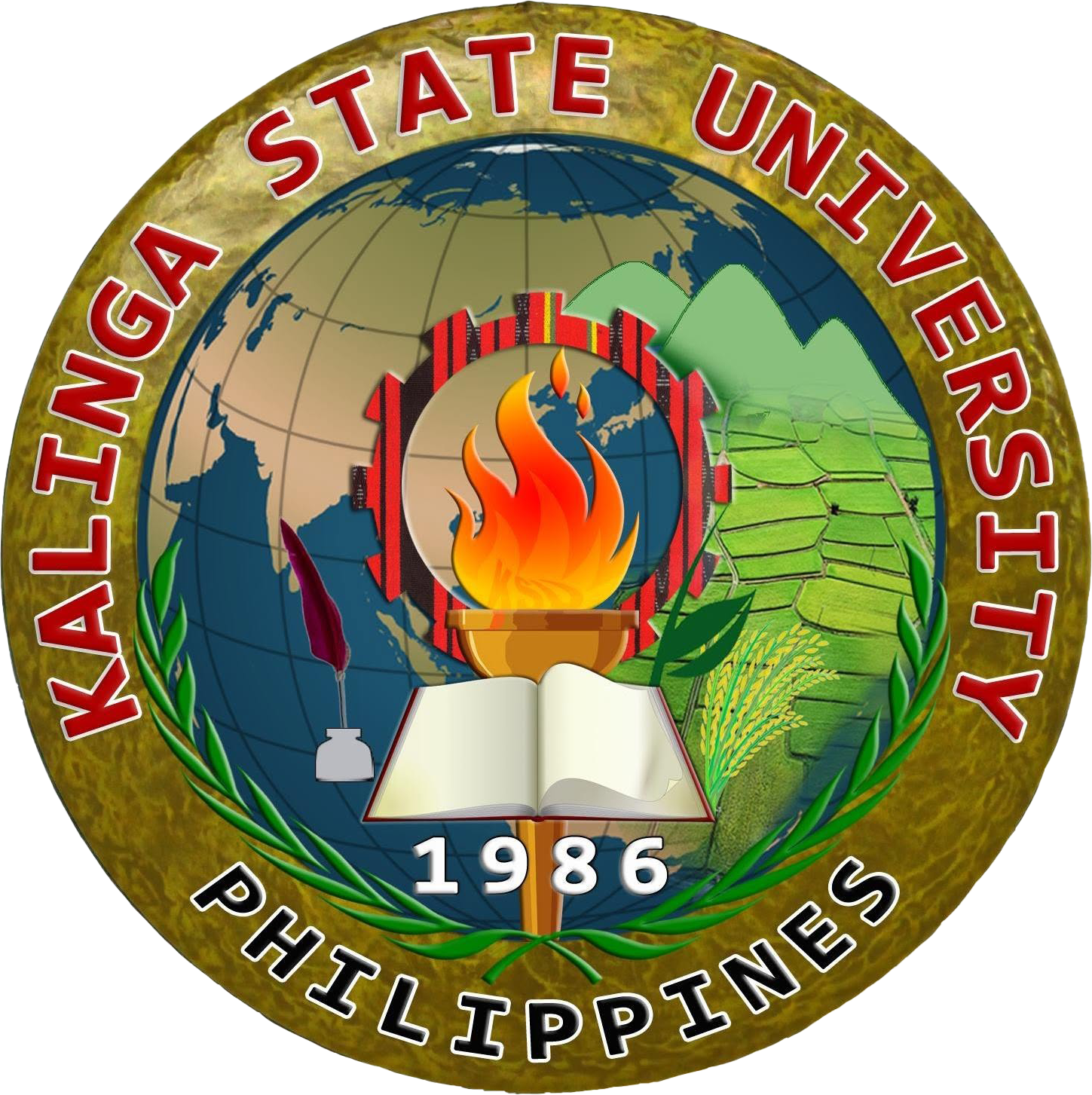
- Former names: Kalinga Community College of Trade and Industries (1974‑1978); Kalinga Community College (1978‑1986); Kalinga-Apayao State College (1986‑2013)
- Type: State University
- Established: 1986; 40 years ago
- Location: Tabuk, Kalinga, 3800, Philippines; 17°24′05″N 121°26′18″E
- Website: ksu.edu.ph
- Location in Luzon Location in the Philippines

Kalinga State University is a state funded higher education institution located in Tabuk City, Kalinga, Philippines. The university is mandated to provide advanced instruction in the arts, agricultural and natural sciences, technological fields, and professional disciplines. The university has multiple campuses and specialized colleges.

== History ==
=== Kalinga Community College of Trade and Industries ===
The foundation of the institution began with the implementation of the then Department of Education, Culture and Sports Order Number 15, series of 1971. This administrative order authorized the creation of government supported community colleges across the Philippines to increase rural access to tertiary education. Acting on this mandate, the Provincial Board of Kalinga-Apayao, under Governor Rolando T. Puzon, passed Resolution Number 97, series of 1974. This resolution established the Kalinga Community College of Trade and Industries.

The Kalinga Community College of Trade and Industries was inaugurated with Augusto Alejandrino as initial administrator. During its early years of operation, the academic offerings were restricted to vocational and technical courses. The curriculum included training in poultry and swine production, garment manufacturing, general trades, and native loom weaving. To support the physical expansion of the institution, the Municipal Council of Tabuk passed Resolution Number 8, which allocated Municipal Plaza Reservation Lot Number 1416 for the construction of the college physical plant.

Following the acquisition of a government permit, the institution expanded to include a two year Midwifery program. By 1978, the administration petitioned for the inclusion of degree programs in Liberal Arts, Commerce, Education, and Secretarial Sciences. Governor Amado B. Almazan then proposed a name change, and the institution was renamed Kalinga Community College.

=== Kalinga-Apayao State College ===
The transition from a community college to a state college was formalized through Presidential Decree 2017, signed on January 26, 1986. This decree mandated the physical and administrative merging of four educational institutions: Kalinga Community College, the BIBAK National Agricultural School, Doňa Eufronia Molina Puzon Memorial High School, and Tabuk National High School. The resulting entity was designated as the Kalinga-Apayao State College.

Administrative delays and technicalities prevented the immediate operationalization of the merged institution. The Kalinga-Apayao State College became operational on October 7, 1992. The initial organizational meeting was presided over by Department of Education, Culture and Sports Undersecretary Luis Baltazar, and attended by regional directors from the National Economic and Development Authority and the Department of Education. Norfredo M. Dulay was designated as the initial Board Secretary. In January 1993, the tertiary academic program of the BIBAK National Agricultural School was integrated into the state college through a Memorandum of Agreement.

On July 7, 1993, Philippine President Fidel Ramos appointed Francisco M. Basuel as initial president of the Kalinga-Apayao State College. During his tenure from 1993 to 1997, the academic portfolio expanded to include Bachelor of Science degrees in Agriculture, Agricultural Engineering, Forestry, Environmental Studies, and Development Education, as well as a Master of Arts in Teaching, Master of Science in Rural Development, and Doctor of Philosophy in Community Development. Land acquisitions during this period included 44 hectares of provincial government reservation for the main campus and 400 hectares from the Department of Environment and Natural Resources in the municipality of Rizal for agricultural research and production.

In 1995, the original territory of Kalinga-Apayao was legally divided by virtue of Republic Act No. 7878, resulting in the separation of the provinces of Kalinga and Apayao. To address the educational requirements of the newly formed Apayao province, the Apayao Institute of Science and Technology was established. This institution subsequently became the Apayao State College on February 26, 1998, through the enactment of Republic Act 8563.

Venus I. Lammawin was president at Kalinga-Apayao State College from 1997 to 2006. Her administration focused on physical infrastructure and administrative modernization. The institution secured external funding from the Department of Science and Technology and the Japan International Cooperation Agency for research and geographic information system development. The institution was elevated to State Universities and Colleges Level II status.

Serafin L. Ngohayon served as Officer in Charge in 2006, before Eduardo T. Bagtang assumed the presidency. Under his administration from 2006 to 2015, the college achieved State Universities and Colleges Level III-A status and secured Civil Service Commission accreditation. Infrastructure developments included the construction of the College of Law and Graduate Studies building, the College of Engineering and Information Technology building, and the establishment of a satellite campus in Barangay Bagbag, Rizal. The administration also initiated international student internship linkages with institutions in Israel, Vietnam, and the United States.

=== Conversion to a State University ===
The legislative process to convert Kalinga-Apayao State College into a state university culminated in the passage of Republic Act 10584, signed into law on May 24, 2013. The law provided the charter for Kalinga State University. Section 48 of the charter stipulated that the conversion would only take effect upon the determination by the Commission on Higher Education that the institution met specific operational requirements. These included achieving Level III accreditation for at least four undergraduate programs and two graduate programs, maintaining a specified ratio of qualified full time faculty, demonstrating adequate library and laboratory facilities, producing research with practical community applications, and maintaining relevant outreach programs. The institution underwent a compliance period from 2013 to 2015. On December 15, 2015, Commission on Higher Education Chairperson Patricia B. Licuanan issued a formal certification acknowledging compliance with Republic Act 10584, officially conferring university status.

Jovita E. Saguibo, who had been appointed as the fourth president of the state college in 2015, became the initial president of Kalinga State University upon its conversion. In October 2017, Bagtang returned as the second university president. Joy Grace P. Doctor was appointed as the third university president in October 2024. Prior to her appointment, Doctor served as the Vice President for Administration and Finance.

The statutory mandate of the university requires the institution to provide advanced education, higher technological instruction, and professional training. The designated fields of specialization include arts, agriculture, forestry, social and natural sciences, and technology. The law guarantees the university academic freedom and institutional autonomy pursuant to Article XIV, Section 5, Paragraph 2 of the 1987 Philippine Constitution.

== Governance structure ==
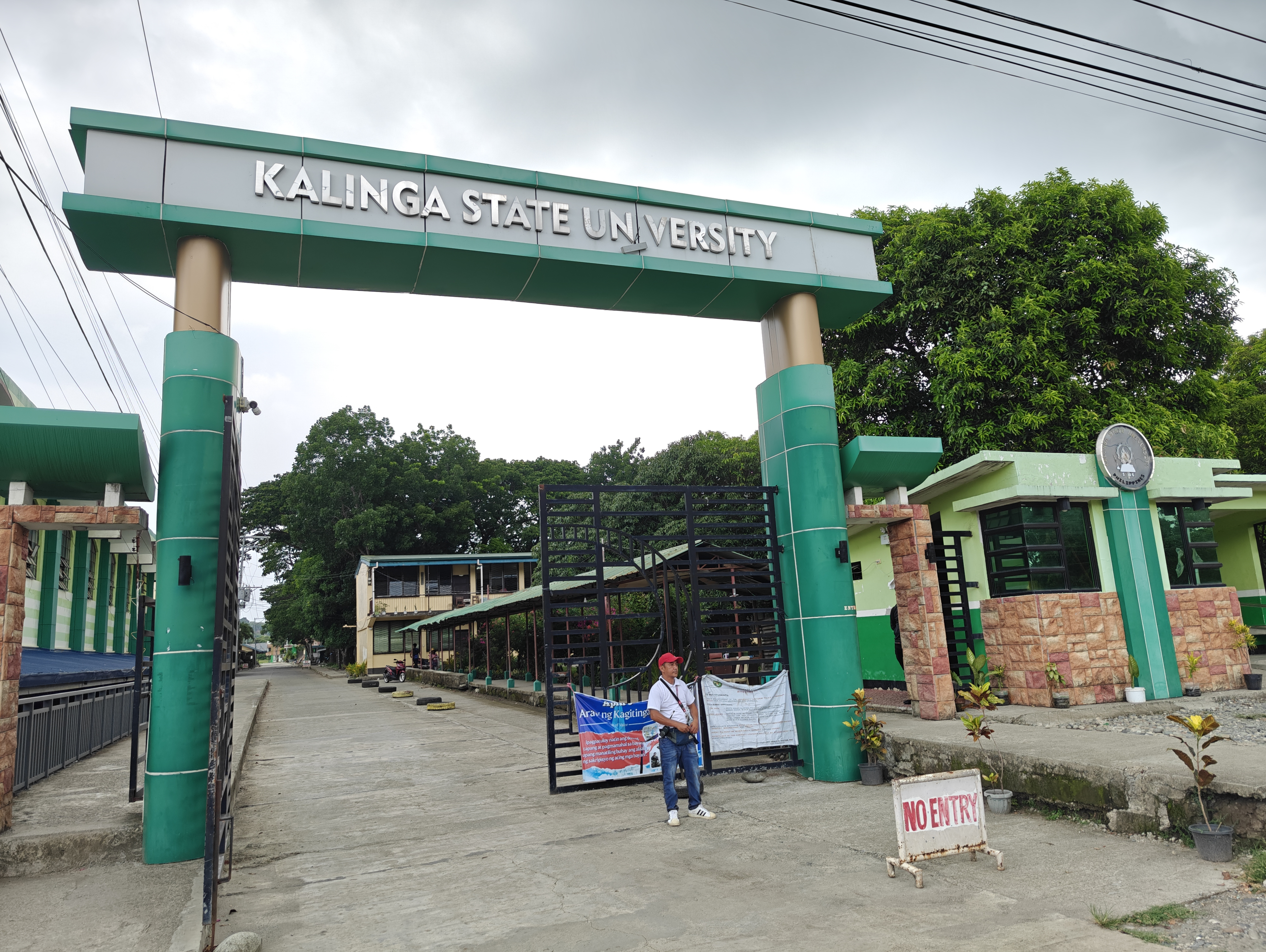
Entrance at the Bulanao campus

The corporate powers of Kalinga State University are vested in the Board of Regents and the University President. The charter grants the Board the power to establish branches, centers, and non-chartered tertiary institutions within Kalinga province, acting in coordination with the Commission on Higher Education and the Department of Budget and Management. The Board is authorized to privatize the management of non academic services, such as health services, food operations, and building maintenance, when such privatization is determined to be advantageous to the institution.

== Campuses ==
The university has three campuses within Kalinga province.

=== Bulanao campus ===
The Bulanao Campus, located in Barangay Bulanao, Tabuk City, serves as the main campus, administrative center and academic hub of the university. The campus occupies a 44 hectare reservation. The main campus houses the Teatro Kalinga, which functions as the venue for university convocations, academic conferences, and cultural events. The Bodong Institute and the central research laboratories are also situated within this campus.

=== Dagupan campus ===
The Dagupan Campus is located in Barangay Dagupan, Tabuk City. This campus is the designated center for liberal arts, social sciences, and business education. The academic infrastructure supports programs such as history, political science, psychology, social work, and accountancy.

=== Rizal campus ===
The Rizal Campus is situated in Barangay Bagbag within the municipality of Rizal. The campus was established on a 400 hectare land grant provided by the Department of Environment and Natural Resources. Due to its land area, the Rizal Campus serves as the main site for the College of Agroforestry and Environmental Science.

== Degree programs ==
The academic structure of Kalinga State University is divided into multiple colleges. Each college offers undergraduate, graduate, and post baccalaureate programs. The university submits its degree programs to the Accrediting Agency of Chartered Colleges and Universities in the Philippines to maintain quality assurance standards.

=== College of Advanced Studies ===
The College of Advanced Studies functions as the graduate school of the university. Located at the Bulanao Campus, the college is mandated to provide advanced academic training, promote graduate level research, and facilitate professional development for educators and public administrators. Under this department are graduate studies on Development Education, Community Development, Public Administration, Business Administration, Rural Development and Education (Majors on Educational Management, English, Filipino, Mathematics, Social Studies)

=== College of Law ===
The College of Law offers a Juris Doctor program designed to prepare students for the Philippine Bar Examinations and legal practice. The curriculum follows a structured four year sequence mandated by the Legal Education Board.

=== College of Criminal Justice ===
The College of Criminal Justice Education prepares students for careers in law enforcement, public safety, and forensic analysis. The college attained ISO 9001:2015 Quality Management System Certification in 2019, covering its admission, registration, and instructional processes. Under this department are undergraduate studies on Criminology and Forensic Science.

=== College of Agriculture ===
The College of Agriculture addresses the agrarian economy of the Cordillera Administrative Region. The college aims to develop agricultural productivity and rural development methodologies. Under this department are undergraduate studies on Agricultural Technology and Agriculture (Majors on Crop Science, Animal Science).

=== College of Forestry ===
The College of Forestry is designed to produce professionals capable of managing the forest resources of Kalinga province while ensuring sustainable development consistent with the cultural values of the local population. Under this department is the undergraduate study on forestry.

=== College of Agroforestry and Environmental Science ===
Situated at the Rizal Campus, this college utilizes the surrounding environmental reserves to deliver instruction focused on the intersection of agriculture and forest ecology. Under this department are undergraduate studies on Agro-Forestry and Environmental Studies.

=== College of Health and Natural Sciences ===
This college addresses local healthcare demands and scientific research needs in the region. Under this department are undergraduate studies on Public Health, Biology, Pharmacy and Midwifery.

=== College of Engineering and Information Technology ===
The College of Engineering and Information Technology focuses on technical education, systems design, and computing. The college objectives include equipping students with the ability to design computer networks, solve engineering problems, and apply mathematical principles to technical systems. > Under this department are undergraduate studies on Civil Engineering, Computer Engineering, Information Technology, Electrical Engineering, and Agricultural and Biosystems Engineering.

=== College of Education ===
The College of Education focuses on pedagogical training and teacher preparation. The college is mandated by Republic Act 10584 to maintain a laboratory high school to serve as a training ground for education students. Under this department are undergraduate studies on Mathematics, Physical Education, Elementary Education, Secondary Education. It also has curriculum programmes on Secondary Education Development Program and Enhanced Secondary Education on Math and Science.

=== College of Liberal Arts and Social Sciences ===
Housed at the Dagupan Campus, the College of Liberal Arts and Social Sciences provides foundational education in the humanities and social behavior. The college objectives state an intent to produce employable graduates equipped with competitive skills and values. Under this department are undergraduate studies on Political Science, Psychology, Social Work, Development Communication, History and the English Language.

=== College of Tourism and Hospitality Management ===
This unit develops human capital for the service sector, focusing on tourism mechanics and hospitality administration. Under this department are undergraduate studies on Tourism Management and Hospitality Management.

=== College of Business Administration and Accountancy ===
The College of Business Administration and Accountancy, also located at the Dagupan Campus, focuses on corporate management, financial systems, and entrepreneurship. The college objectives involve equipping students with conceptual, managerial, and technical skills for business environments. Under this department are undergraduate studies on Entrepreneurship, Accountancy, Business Administration and Office Administration.

=== College of Public Administration and Indigenous Governance ===
This college represents a specialized academic unit addressing the specific administrative contexts of the Cordillera Administrative Region. The curriculum incorporates principles of public administration with the mechanics of indigenous governance systems unique to the Kalinga population. Under this department is the undergraduate study on Public Administration.

== Research and extension ==
Kalinga State University is statutorily required to undertake research and extension services. The institutional strategy connects empirical research with community application, focusing on agriculture, indigenous knowledge systems, and socio-economic development in upland communities.

=== Bodong Institute ===
The Bodong Institute functions as a central research and extension entity within the university. The institute contains four main functional units. The Research Unit employs field researchers and documenters to conduct studies on indigenous practices. The Training and Extension Unit develops skills programs for community members. The Administrative and Finance Unit manages resource allocation. The Information Technology and Digital Archive Unit is responsible for the digitization and preservation of Kalinga cultural heritage and multimedia projects.

=== Research conferences and academic collaboration ===
The university serves as a venue for academic exchange within the region. In May 2026, the university hosted the 1st Lumin-awa International Multidisciplinary Research Conference at the Bulanao Campus. The conference operated under the theme "Innovating Justice and Governance: Multidisciplinary Pathways to Equity, Inclusion, and Sustainable Development".

=== Community extension programs ===
The College of Business Administration and Accountancy established a formal partnership with the Department of Agrarian Reform Kalinga Provincial Office to address the financial management capabilities of local agrarian entities.

In November 2024, the Bachelor of Science in Accountancy program conducted bookkeeping training for barangay officials and organizational officers in Barangay Apatan, Pinukpuk. These initiatives aim to improve the organizational capacity of local farmers and cooperatives, thereby promoting operational efficiency and accountability in rural sectors. The university also engages in partnerships with the Provincial Local Government Unit of Kalinga and the Department of Social Welfare and Development to bolster sustainable livelihood programs.
