= South Cotabato State College =

State college in South Cotabato, Philippines

- Kolehiyo ng Estado sa Timog Cotabato (Filipino)
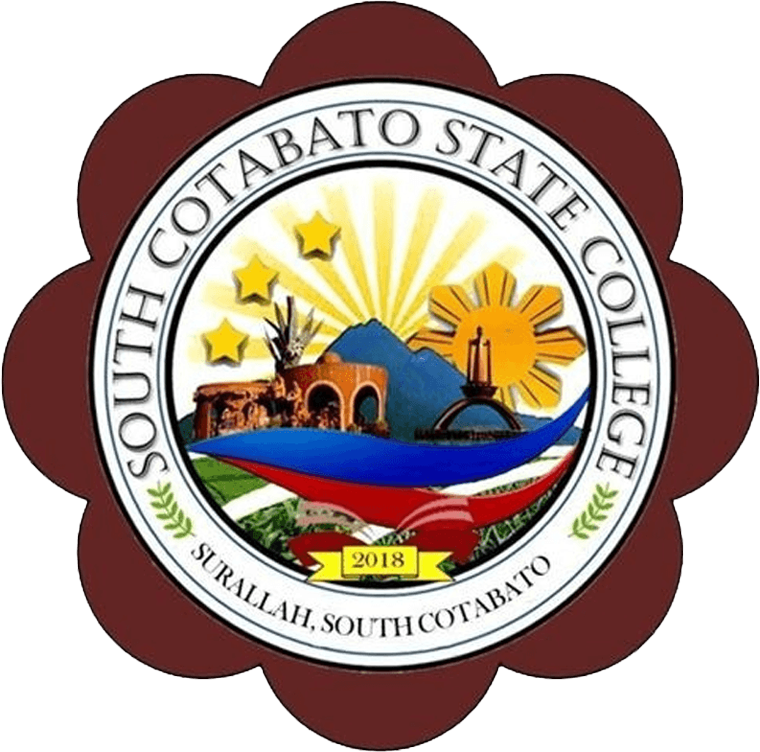
- Former name: Surallah National Agricultural School (1975‑2018)
- Type: State college
- Established: 2018; 8 years ago
- Location: Surallah, South Cotabato, 9512, Philippines; 6°22′40″N 124°43′32″E
- Website: scsc.edu.ph
- Location in Mindanao Location in the Philippines

South Cotabato State College (SCSC) is a public higher education institution located in the municipality of Surallah, province of South Cotabato, Philippines. The institution functions as the primary state-funded college in the province. The college is mandated to provide advanced instruction, research, and extension services across various disciplines, with a foundational focus on agriculture, allied technological sciences, education, and the arts. The institution serves the student population of South Cotabato and the broader administrative region of Region XII, integrating technical-vocational training with traditional baccalaureate degree programs. It originated as a secondary agricultural school in 1975 and operated under the supervision of the Technical Education and Skills Development Authority (TESDA) before attaining its current chartered status in 2018 through legislative action. The college is currently the subject of pending national legislation aimed at converting it into a state university.

== History ==
=== Surallah National Agricultural School ===
The institution was originally founded as the Surallah National Agricultural School. It commenced operations as a secondary agricultural school on June 25, 1975, following the enactment of Republic Act No 5704. The physical establishment of the school was dependent on localized community action. The Parents Teachers Association of the municipality acquired a 16-hectare property situated in Barangay Dajay, Surallah. This parcel of land was formally donated to the Department of Education, Culture and Sports to establish a dedicated agricultural educational facility for the municipality. For the initial two decades of its operation, the Surallah National Agricultural School focused exclusively on basic secondary agricultural instruction, catering to the agrarian demographic of the local region. The curriculum was designed to provide foundational farming and crop management skills to high school students in South Cotabato.

=== Inclusion in the AGRITECH Project and TESDA Integration ===
On August 21, 1995, Ricardo Gloria, the Secretary Department of Education, Culture and Sports (DECS) at the time, issued a formal advisory integrating the Surallah National Agricultural School into the Philippines-Australian Agricultural Technology Education Project, commonly referred to as the AGRITECH Project. This integration was formalized through a Memorandum of Agreement executed between the Department of Education, Culture and Sports and the Commission on Higher Education. Under this agreement, the school was officially designated as one of the Provincial Technical Institutes of Agriculture in Mindanao.

Following this designation, the institution expanded its curricular offerings into tertiary education. Beginning in the academic year 1997 to 1998, the school introduced a ladderized post-secondary course: the Diploma in Agricultural Technology, which transitioned into the Bachelor in Agriculture Technology.

Concurrently, the Philippine government enacted Republic Act No. 7796, which established the Technical Education and Skills Development Authority. Pursuant to this law, the administrative control, supervision, and funding of the Surallah National Agricultural School were transferred from the DECS to TESDA. Throughout this period, the school functioned primarily as a technical-vocational institute within Region 12, aligning its programs with national competency standards for agricultural and industrial trades.

=== Conversion to a state college ===
The legal transition from a vocational school to an independent chartered state college required specific legislative action by the Philippine Congress. South Cotabato 2nd district Representative Ferdinand L. Hernandez, authored and sponsored House Bill No. 367, the primary legislation for this conversion. The bill was substituted as House Bill No. 6202 after amendments from the Committee on Higher and Technical Education on August 15, 2017. It passed on third and final reading on August 29, 2017 with no objections.

At the Senate, Senator JV Ejercito filed a similar measure, Senate Bill No. 1587. On August 31, 2017, the Senate received the approved copy of House Bill No. 6202. On February 19, 2018, the Senate approved Senate Bill No. 1587 on third and final reading. On May 30, 2018, the House and the Senate convened for the Bicameral Conference Committee on the disagreeing provisions of the two bills until the conclusion of the second regular session of the 17th Congress.

The Bicameral Conference Committee agreed on the harmonized versions on 24 July 2018 upon the opening of the third regular session of the 17th Congress. The House and the Senate both ratified the Bicameral Conference Committee report on August 29, 2018 with no objections.

The final version of the bill was transmitted to the Office of the President on November 15, 2018. On December 13, 2018, President Rodrigo Duterte signed the charter as Republic Act No. 11150 into law. The charter mandated the complete integration of the existing Surallah National Agricultural School into the new entity, stipulating that the main campus would remain at the Barangay Dajay site.

The transition process required compliance with standards set by the Commission on Higher Education. The college administration began compliance preparations in early 2019, eventually submitting a comprehensive five-year development plan and requisite academic documentation in January 2020. The Commission on Higher Education issued an initial approval of the institution's state college status on January 22, 2021, declaring the facility compliant with higher education standards. Formal recognition was granted during an award ceremony on July 23, 2021, led by Commission on Higher Education Chairperson Prospero de Vera III. The institution commenced its inaugural academic year as a fully functioning higher education institution in the period covering 2021 to 2022.

== Governance structure ==
The governance, administration, and pedagogical direction of South Cotabato State College are dictated by the provisions of its charter, Republic Act No. 11150, alongside the policies promulgated by the Commission on Higher Education.

Section 2 of Republic Act No. 11150 requires the institution to provide advanced instruction and research in agriculture, allied technological sciences, education, and arts and related sciences. The mandate extends beyond classroom instruction, requiring the college to undertake extension programs and development initiatives, and to provide instructional and research leadership concerning agricultural, environmental, and technological development within the Province of South Cotabato and the wider Soccsksargen area. Section 3 of the charter outlines the authorized curricular offerings. The college is permitted to offer both undergraduate and graduate courses across fields including agriculture, environmental management, engineering, education, and the arts and sciences, subject to the capabilities of the institution and the decisions of its governing board. The law explicitly mandates that the technical-vocational courses previously offered under the supervision of the Technical Education and Skills Development Authority must remain integrated into the college's curriculum.

=== Board of trustees ===
The administration of the college and the exercise of its corporate powers are vested exclusively in the board of trustees and the president of the college, pursuant to Section 4 of the charter. The board serves as the primary governing and policy-making body. Section 5 of the charter dictates that the board shall be chaired by the chairperson of the Commission on Higher Education, with the president of the college serving as the co-chairperson or vice chairperson. The inclusion of specific national and regional officials ensures that the strategic direction of the college aligns with broader economic and educational policies. These officials are the chairperson of the Senate Committee on Education, Arts and Culture, the chairperson of the House Committee on Higher and Technical Education, the regional director of the Department of Economy, Planning, and Development Region 12, the regional director of the Department of Agriculture Region 12, the regional director of the Technical Education and Skills Development Authority Region 12. The board also allocates seats for a faculty representative, a student representative, and a member of its alumni.

The law stipulates that the two prominent citizens from the private sector are to be appointed by the board from a list of at least five qualified individuals recommended by a search committee. Section 8 of the charter requires the board to convene regularly at least once every quarter. A quorum requires the presence of a majority of all members holding office, with the strict condition that either the chairperson of the board or the president of the college must be present to conduct official business.

Section 7 of the charter enumerates the specific powers and duties granted to the Board of Trustees, which are exercised in addition to the general corporate powers defined under the Corporation Code of the Philippines. The Board is authorized to approve the curricula, instructional programs, and rules of discipline proposed by the internal Academic and Administrative Councils. It holds the power to award honorary degrees to individuals who have made outstanding contributions in fields such as education, public service, arts, science and technology, or agriculture, and to authorize the issuance of certificates of completion. The Board is mandated to establish research and extension centers to facilitate the development of the college. It possesses the authority to develop academic arrangements for institutional capability building with external agencies, both public and private, and to appoint experts, specialists, consultants, and visiting scholars3. The charter allows the Board to adopt modern and innovative modes of transmitting knowledge, explicitly mentioning information technology, the dual training system, and open distance learning.

A significant power granted to the Board is the authority to absorb non-chartered tertiary institutions located within the Province of South Cotabato as branches and centers. This action must be executed in coordination with the Commission on Higher Education and in consultation with the Department of Budget and Management, with the objective of promoting equal access to educational opportunities. Furthermore, the Board is empowered to enter into joint ventures with business and industry entities for the profitable development and management of the college's economic assets, with the proceeds directed toward institutional strengthening. The Board also holds the authority to extend the tenure of the College President beyond the standard age of retirement, up to the age of seventy, provided the President's performance is rated as outstanding.

=== Administrative and internal governance ===
The daily operations, academic supervision, and financial management of the college are executed by a formalized administrative structure. College President serves as its chief executive officer. Other executive roles include the Vice President for Academic Affairs, a Chief Administrative Officer, a College Registrar, the Director for Instruction, the Director of the Office of the Student Affairs, the Director of Research and Development, the Director of Technical Vocational Education Training, Dean of the Institute of Agriculture, Director for Internationalization and the Director for Extension Services.

Financial administration is handled by specific units that report to the executive officers. The SCSC Budget Unit is tasked with planning, preparing, and monitoring the annual and supplemental budgets. This unit is responsible for reviewing budget proposals from internal departments, ensuring expenditures remain within authorized appropriations, and issuing budgetary certifications. The Budget Unit must ensure strict compliance with the regulations of the Department of Budget and Management and the Commission on Audit, providing reports to oversight agencies and guiding the institution on fiscal discipline.

== Academic institutes and curricular structure ==
The academic architecture of South Cotabato State College is divided into specific institutes based on academic disciplines. The institution utilizes a blended pedagogical model that incorporates competency-based vocational assessments into traditional baccalaureate degree structures.

Because of its history as an agricultural and vocational school under the Technical Education and Skills Development Authority, the college integrates technical-vocational modules directly into its degree programs. Students enrolled in bachelor's degree courses are required to undergo competency assessments and earn national certificates from the Technical Education and Skills Development Authority as they progress through their studies. This dual-credential system aims to produce graduates who possess both theoretical academic knowledge and standardized practical skills. In addition to degree-integrated modules, the college offers standalone technical-vocational programs, including Trainers Methodology 1, Animal Health Care and Management National Certificate II, Agri Crop Production National Certificate II, and Barangay Health Service National Certificate II.

=== Institute of Agriculture ===
The Institute of Agriculture serves as the primary academic unit for agricultural sciences, reflecting the historical core of the institution. The institute is dedicated to instruction, research, and extension services within the agricultural sector. The curriculum focuses on imparting scientific knowledge and practical skills related to crop production, animal production, agribusiness, and the application of modern farming technologies. The primary degree program within this unit is the Bachelor of Science in Agriculture. Other specific major concentrations are offered as well. These new majors include Animal Science, Agricultural Extension, Crop Science (Agronomy), Crop Science (Horticulture), and Crop Science (Organic Agriculture)14. The institute also offers a Bachelor of Science in Agribusiness.

=== Institute of Teacher Education ===
The Institute of Teacher Education is designed to train educators for both basic and vocational education sectors. The unit provides instruction in pedagogical theory, practical teaching methodologies, and classroom management. The institute also conducts localized educational research and community extension activities aimed at supporting lifelong learning in rural communities.

The central degree program of this institute is the Bachelor in Technical-Vocational Teacher Education. This program is offered with four distinct major specializations: Food and Service Management, Animal Production, Agricultural Crops Production, and Civil and Construction Technology. The Bachelor of Technology and Livelihood Education with a Major in Home Economics is also offered. On January 6, 2026, the institute held its inaugural pinning ceremony to honor fourth-year students in the technical-vocational teacher education track, marking their transition into teaching internships.

=== Institute of Business, Entrepreneurship, and Management ===
The Institute of Business, Entrepreneurship, and Management provides instruction centered on commerce, finance, and organizational leadership. The academic framework of the unit equips students with competencies in business management, marketing strategies, and enterprise development. The institute supports local economic development through extension services aimed at assisting small enterprises. The academic programs offered under this institute include the Bachelor of Science in Entrepreneurship and the Bachelor of Science in Tourism Management.

== Research output and academic publications ==
The Research and Development Office of South Cotabato State College functions as the coordinating body for institutional research activities. Faculty members conduct investigations primarily focusing on pedagogy, vocational training efficacy, local agricultural practices, and student psychology, disseminating their findings in academic journals and regional symposia.

=== Research on vocational education and teaching competencies ===
Research generated by the faculty regularly examines the effectiveness of the vocational training integrated into the college's curriculum. A study titled Teaching Competence, Laboratory Resource Availability, and Student Performance in Bartending Courses at South Cotabato State College was published in the International Journal of Research and Innovation in Social Science in June 2026.

The research employed a quantitative descriptive-correlational design, drawing a sample of 50 students enrolled in specific bartending courses. The study measured variables including instructional delivery, subject matter expertise, and classroom and laboratory management against the availability and maintenance of laboratory resources. Statistical analysis was conducted using the Mann-Whitney U test, Kruskal-Wallis H test, and Spearman's rho correlation coefficient. The data indicated that students rated teaching competence very high, specifically noting subject matter expertise, while laboratory resource availability was rated high regarding functionality. The Spearman's rho correlation revealed strong positive and statistically significant relationships between both teaching competence and student performance, and laboratory resources and student performance. The findings suggest that physical infrastructure in vocational courses holds equal statistical weight to instructor capability in determining student outcomes.

=== Studies on language instruction methodologies ===
Faculty members have also investigated specific pedagogical interventions in academic instruction. A study titled TPS: Teaching Methods to Enhance Academic Performance and Self-Efficacy of Students in Filipino Subject was published in the International Journal of Innovative Science and Research Technology in September 2025. The study investigated the application of the Think-Pair-Share collaborative learning strategy. The researchers utilized a pre-experimental design involving a one-group pretest-posttest structure to measure academic changes. Self-efficacy was measured concurrently using a 25-item Likert scale questionnaire. Data analysis executed via a paired t-test demonstrated a significant change in academic performance; the mean score of the student group increased from 9.74 in the pretest to 20.06 in the posttest, generating a mean gain score of 10.32. The self-efficacy metric similarly increased from 2.46 to 3.60, representing a mean gain of 1.13. The research concluded that the interactive mechanisms of the Think-Pair-Share method directly improved cognitive processing and student confidence in language acquisition.

=== Investigations into student psychology and vulnerability ===
Another research by the institution focused on analyzing the psychological and demographic profiles of students in the region. In a study investigating student well-being, it examined the relationships between vulnerability, agency, and mental health challenges among the student population. The descriptive-correlational research targeted the college's population of 1,024 students. Utilizing the Cochran formula for finite populations with a 95 percent confidence level and a 5 percent margin of error, a sample of 280 students was selected through stratified random sampling across five academic programs. The study measured academic, financial, and social vulnerability against metrics of self-efficacy and goal-orientation.. Analysis using the Spearman rank correlation coefficient revealed a strong positive correlation between vulnerability and mental health challenges, indicating that higher vulnerability levels predictably associated with greater mental health struggles. Conversely, student agency showed a very weak negative correlation with mental health challenges. This statistical finding implies that high levels of individual agency are insufficient to mitigate mental health issues driven by systemic academic or financial vulnerabilities, requiring structural institutional support. Earlier research also includes a 2022 study titled HIV/AIDS Awareness and the Level of Sexual Risk Behaviors Among Senior High School Students: An Evaluation, published in the Journal of Social, Humanity, and Education. Employing both qualitative and quantitative methods, including Z-tests and Pearson product-moment correlations, the research found that general awareness of HIV/AIDS among the sampled youth was fair, and while baseline sexual risk behaviors were categorized as very low, specific demographic subsets exhibited higher statistical probabilities for risk engagement. In 2024, the institution published A double-edged sword: Examining the link between students' dependence on artificial intelligence (AI) and their psychosocial maturity in the journal TWIST. Analyzing a sample of 276 undergraduate students at the college, the study utilized Pearson's correlation coefficient to examine emotional regulation, social responsibility, and independence in the context of reliance on automated text and data generation tools.

=== Additional faculty publications ===
Faculty research extends to agricultural adaptation and organizational management. It published Climate change awareness and adaptation by rice farmers in Surallah, South Cotabato in 2024, a study directly aligning with the institution's agricultural mandate. Another study, Predictive Role of Innovation Strategies on Organizational Performance among State Universities and Colleges in Region XII, Philippines, investigated administrative efficacy within the regional higher education sector.

=== Participation in regional research symposia ===
South Cotabato State College integrates its research output with regional academic networks. The institution is an active member of the SOCCSKSARGEN Agriculture, Aquatic and Natural Resources Research and Development Consortium (SOXAARRDEC). This consortium coordinates research programs among national and regional agencies and academic institutions in Region XII, operating under the framework of the Philippine Council for Agriculture, Aquatic and Natural Resources Research and Development. South Cotabato State College officially joined the consortium in 2022. On November 20, 2025, the college participated in the 32nd Regional Symposium on Research and Development Highlights organized by SOXAARRDEC at the University of Southern Mindanao in Kabacan, Cotabato. The institution submitted an entry in the Poster Category of the Research Division titled First Glimpse into the Ichthyofauna of Allah River, South Central Mindanao, Philippines. The research documented local fish biodiversity in the regional river system, establishing baseline data intended for future environmental conservation and aquatic resource management.

The college also hosts an internal annual academic event known as Scholarly SPARX (Student Pitching and Research Expo). Organized by the Research and Development Office, the June 2026 iteration gathered student researchers from the Institute of Agriculture, the Institute of Business, Entrepreneurship, and Management, and the Institute of Teacher Education. The exposition featured structured competitions in Research Paper and Oral Presentation, Research Poster Presentation, Policy Pitch, and Business Model Canvas Pitch. The first-place award for Best Research Paper was awarded to John Paul D. Francisco, while CJ Vincent Operio won the Policy Pitch category for a proposal on Rice Husk Biochar Policy.

=== Institutional capacity building in molecular biology ===
To advance its scientific research capabilities, the institution allocates resources for specialized faculty training in biotechnology and genomics. From May 18 to 22, 2026, a delegation of faculty and personnel from the college attended the Molecular Biology Camp and a Customized Bioinformatics Training hosted by the Philippine Genome Center Mindanao at the University of the Philippines Mindanao Campus in Davao City. The intensive training provided practical exposure to laboratory-based molecular biology techniques. Participants received hands-on instruction in DNA extraction processes, Polymerase Chain Reaction amplification protocols, and agarose gel electrophoresis. The bioinformatics component of the training focused on command-line operations for genomic data and the practical application of MEGA 7 and MEGA 11 software. Faculty were trained to create phylogenetic trees using this software, a skill necessary for determining evolutionary relationships among organisms based on sequenced DNA data. This capacity building was intended to support the college's future research trajectory in biodiversity, agricultural biotechnology, and genomics.

== Inter-agency linkages and extension services ==
In alignment with its statutory mandate to conduct extension services, the college maintains formal partnerships and executes community outreach programs.

On March 10, 2025, the college, represented by its president, executed a Memorandum of Understanding with the Department of Social Welfare and Development (DSWD) Field Office 12. The agreement launched the Tara, Basa! Tutoring Program in South Cotabato, formalizing the college's role in providing student tutors for localized literacy interventions.

On March 17, 2025, an academic partnership was formalized through a Memorandum of Understanding with the South Cotabato Economic Enterprise Management Office (SCEEMO) signed at the Provincial Capitol Compound in Koronadal City. The agreement establishes a framework for collaborative projects between the college and the provincial economic management office to support regional economic development initiatives.

A delegation from the college conducted a benchmarking activity at Central Mindanao University (CMU) in Maramag, Bukidnon, on February 5 and 6, 202616. The activity investigated the operational processes of CMU's Agricultural and Biosystems Engineering programs, as well as administrative procedures relating to the Accounting, Budget, and Procurement units, and the Bids and Awards Committee.

The institution also independently manages the Adopt-a-Community and Adopt-a-School Project. Under this program, SCSC constructed a potable water source for the residents of Sitio Kaong and the students of Little Baguio Elementary School, Lemluma Extension, located in Barangay Little Baguio. Furthermore, the college participates in regional environmental efforts, such as the Puno Sang Kabuhi Tree-Growing Festival in Sitio Lambusong.

== Infrastructure developments ==
As a state-funded entity, the financial operations of the college are regulated by the General Appropriations Act and monitored by national oversight agencies. The institution posts its Approved Budgets, Annual Procurement Plans, and Procurement Monitoring Reports in compliance with the national Transparency Seal requirements.

Procurement records indicate ongoing infrastructure development on the campus. In January 2026, the college initiated the procurement process for the construction of a 3-storey school dormitory. Subsequent procurement activities in April 2026 included the supply, delivery, and installation of drywall partitions, furniture, and fixtures. The institution also contracts external private security agencies for campus protection, with procurement for these services recorded in November 2025. Student financial assistance relies heavily on national subsidies, including the free tuition provisions of the Universal Access to Quality Tertiary Education Act and disbursements from the Unified Student Financial Assistance System for Tertiary Education (UniFAST) Tulong Dunong Program.
