= Zamboanga del Sur Polytechnic State College =

State vocational school in Pagadian, Philippines

- Kolehiyong Pangestado sa Zamboanga del Sur (Filipino)
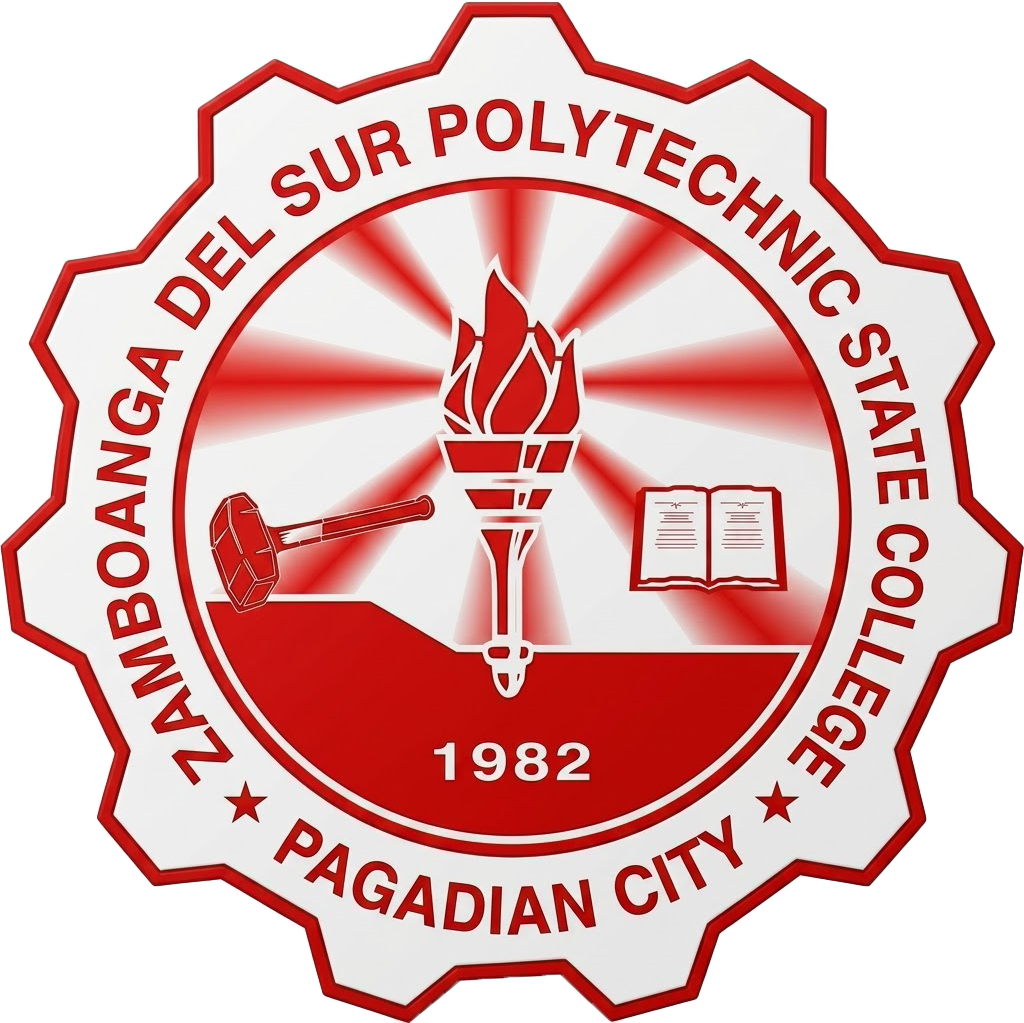
- Former names: Pagadian Arts and Trades School (1971‑1982); Zamboanga del Sur School of Arts and Trades (1982‑2025)
- Type: State college
- Established: 1982; 44 years ago
- Location: Pagadian, Zamboanga del Sur, 7016, Philippines; 7°49′30″N 123°27′00″E
- Location in Mindanao Location in the Philippines

Zamboanga del Sur Polytechnic State College (ZDSPSC) is a public, state funded higher education institution located in Barangay Kawit, Pagadian City, Zamboanga del Sur, Philippines. Originally founded as a secondary and post secondary vocational training facility known as the Zamboanga del Sur School of Arts and Trades, the institution underwent a statutory conversion into a formal state college in September 7, 2025 following the enactment of Republic Act No. 12282. The institution operates under a legal mandate to deliver advanced instruction, higher technological and professional education, and training programs across multiple disciplines, including engineering, education, agriculture, arts and sciences, and vocational technology. As a chartered polytechnic state college, the institution functions within the higher education sector of the Zamboanga Peninsula, focusing on technical skills development, academic research, and extension services.

== History ==
=== Pagadian Arts and Trades School ===
The legal foundation of the school was initially established by Republic Act No. 6277, a statute that was enacted without executive approval on June 19, 1971. This legislation formally created a school of arts and trades in the City of Pagadian under the direct administrative supervision of the Director of Vocational Education. The early curricular structure mandated by Republic Act No. 6277 operated on a strictly phased schedule. During the first and second years of operation, the institution was required to enroll students in a general education curriculum integrated with practical arts instruction. In the third and fourth years, students were scheduled to transition into a dedicated vocational education curriculum. The establishing law also directed the school to provide short vocational courses specifically targeted at elementary school graduates, designed to train individuals for vocations identified as necessary within the local community. Furthermore, Republic Act No. 6277 contained a provision directing the school to open two year post secondary technical courses as soon as operational conditions made it feasible. To support the establishment, operation, and maintenance of the school during the fiscal year 1971, the legislature authorized an initial appropriation of 200,000 pesos from the National Treasury.

=== Zamboanga del Sur School of Arts and Trades ===
Despite the passage of Republic Act No. 6277, the institution required a second foundational legislative process a decade later to fully operationalize its mandate. On February 8, 1982, the Batasang Pambansa, the parliamentary legislature of the Philippines at the time, passed Batas Pambansa Blg. 159. This subsequent legislation re established the Zamboanga del Sur School of Arts and Trades in the City of Pagadian. Batas Pambansa Blg. 159 granted the Minister of Education and Culture the authority to determine the specific curricular offerings of the school. The statute directed the Minister to implement the provisions of the act to ensure the school commenced operations during the first school term following the approval of the legislation. For this phase of institutional development, an appropriation of 300,000 pesos was authorized for the school's operation, explicitly charged to the funds allocated under Batas Pambansa Blg. 80 for the Ministry of Education and Culture intended for new national schools. The law stated that starting in the calendar year 1983, the necessary sums for the continued operation and maintenance of the school would be included in the annual General Appropriations Act.

Following the 1982 legislation, the Zamboanga del Sur School of Arts and Trades functioned for approximately four decades as a public school of arts and trades. Operating on an approximately five hectare land area in Barangay Kawit, Pagadian City, the school provided secondary education, technical vocational training, and post secondary certificate programs. The primary operational objective during this period was to equip the youth of Pagadian City and surrounding municipalities with practical trade skills to facilitate immediate entry into the local workforce.

=== Conversion to a state polytechnic college ===
The transition of the institution from a school of arts and trades under the Department of Education to a chartered state college under the Commission on Higher Education required a dedicated legislative process during the 19th Congress. Representative Divina Grace Yu of the 1st District of Zamboanga del Sur initiated the conversion process by introducing House Bill No. 1264 which was substituted as House Bill No. 9332

The legislative rationale presented for the conversion centered on the need to widen the institution's curriculum and address the requirements of an expanding student population in Zamboanga del Sur. Representative Yu articulated that establishing a polytechnic state college in Pagadian City would create a specialized educational facility capable of developing and strengthening the provincial industrial base. The proposal aimed to elevate the administrative status of the institution, thereby enabling it to offer full baccalaureate degrees and receive direct national funding allocations as a State University and College entity.

The conversion measure received unanimous support from the members present during the session in the House of Representatives. Following its passage in the lower chamber, the bill was transmitted to the Senate. In the upper chamber, the Senate Committee on Higher, Technical, and Vocational Education, chaired by Senator Alan Peter Cayetano, took jurisdiction over the measure. The committee processed the conversion of the Zamboanga del Sur School of Arts and Trades alongside a broader legislative package designed to increase the institutional capacity of various higher education facilities in provincial localities. The Senate approved the conversion measure on its third and final reading with unanimous support from the voting senators.

Following the approval by both chambers of the legislature, the enrolled bill was transmitted to the executive branch. The measure officially lapsed into law as Republic Act No. 12282 on September 7, 2025.

== Statutory mandate ==
Republic Act No. 12282 serves as the primary legal instrument governing the institution. Section 3 of the charter enumerates specific fields of study that the college is mandated to cover, including engineering, education, arts and sciences, trades and the arts, as well as vocational and technology courses. The legal mandate extends beyond instructional delivery to impose requirements for research and community engagement. The charter dictates that the institution shall promote research, conduct extension and income generating services, and participate in production activities. Furthermore, the legislation requires the college to provide progressive leadership in its designated areas of specialization, requiring the institution to actively contribute to the development of industrial and educational practices within the Zamboanga Peninsula region.

Section 4 of Republic Act No. 12282 legally authorized the college to offer short term technical vocational, undergraduate, and graduate courses. The fields of engineering, education, agriculture, arts and sciences, and trade and the arts. It also explicitly mandates the provision of specific vocational and technology courses, listing welding technology, vocational technology, fishery technology, and hotel and restaurant services as required offerings.

A distinct structural provision within Section 4 allows the Zamboanga del Sur Polytechnic State College to continue the operation of a reasonably sized laboratory junior and senior high school. The statute places this laboratory school under the direct administrative supervision of the College of Education. The stated legal purpose of retaining the secondary education component is to serve the in campus requirements of its students, specifically providing a controlled pedagogical environment for undergraduate students pursuing degrees in education.

The charter also grants the institution the administrative authority to expand its physical footprint and organizational structure. The college is empowered to absorb non chartered tertiary institutions located within the Province of Zamboanga del Sur and the broader Zamboanga Peninsula. It also stipulates that these absorbed entities may operate as branches, extension centers, or external centers. However, the exercise of this expansionary power is subject to procedural requirements; the absorption must be conducted in coordination with the Commission on Higher Education and in consultation with the Department of Budget and Management, ensuring that any expansion aligns with national educational strategies and budgetary constraints.

== Governance structure ==
Section 5 of Republic Act No. 12282 establishes the fundamental administrative framework of the institution annd vests the administration of the college and the exercise of these corporate powers exclusively in a board of trustees and the president of the college. The board of trustees serves as the highest governing body of the institution. It is chaired by the chairperson of the Commission on Higher Education. The president of the Zamboanga del Sur Polytechnic State College holds the position of vice chairperson of the board. Legislative oversight is directly integrated into the governance structure through the inclusion of two ex officio members from the Congress of the Philippines. The chairperson of the Committee on Higher, Technical and Vocational Education of the Senate and the Chairperson of the Committee on Higher and Technical Education of the House of Representatives both hold permanent seats on the board. The statute requires the participation of regional directors from three specific executive departments, linking the college's strategic direction to broader regional development metrics. The board includes the regional director of the Department of Economy, Planning and Development (DepDev), ensuring alignment with macroeconomic and regional planning. The Regional Director of the Department of Agriculture is included, reflecting the mandate to offer agricultural courses and supporting the agrarian base of the regional economy. Additionally, the Regional Director of the Department of Science and Technology is a member of the board, providing oversight regarding the institution's engineering programs, technological research, and innovation initiatives. Internal stakeholders are represented on the board through the inclusion of the presidents of various institutional federations. The board mandates seats for the president of the federation of faculty associations, the president of the federation of student councils, and the president of the federation of alumni associations. Furthermore, a representative of the nonteaching or personnel association of the college is included in the board composition. The charter specifies that the terms of office for these internal representatives are coterminous with their respective terms of office as presidents or representatives of their organizations, as dictated by their respective internal constitutions. Private sector participation is structurally guaranteed through the mandated appointment of two prominent citizens to the board. The charter requires these individuals to be selected from the private sector and to have distinguished themselves in their professions or fields of specialization. The appointment process for these two positions requires the Board of Trustees to select from a list of at least five qualified persons from the Province of Zamboanga del Sur. This list is generated and recommended by a formal Search Committee, which is constituted by the president of the college in consultation with the chairperson of the Commission on Higher Education and other members of the board. Once appointed, these prominent citizens serve a fixed term of two years.

== Academic and curricular framework ==
The academic architecture of Zamboanga del Sur Polytechnic State College is divided across secondary education, technical vocational training, and higher education degree programs. This multi level curricular framework reflects the institution's historical function as a trade school and its expanded statutory mandate as a state college.

=== Undergraduate degree programs ===
At the baccalaureate level, the institution offers programs that align with its technological and educational mandates. The college provides a Bachelor of Science in Information Technology degree, a program designed to support the regional demand for professionals capable of systems administration, software development, and network management.

The institution also offers a Bachelor of Elementary Education program. This degree program is structurally linked to the college's mandate to operate a laboratory school under the supervision of the College of Education. The laboratory school serves as the primary facility for the practicum and pre service training requirements of the students enrolled in the elementary education program.

=== Technical and vocational education and training ===
The technical and vocational division maintains the institution's original focus on competency based training, offering specific skill certifications regulated by the national framework for technical education. The college offers a range of specializations leading to National Certificate credentials. In the sector of Information and Communication Technology, the college provides training in Computer System Servicing NC II. The programming curriculum extends to advanced certifications, including Computer Programming NC IV, Java Programming NC III, PHP and .NET Programming NC III, and Oracle Database NC III. These courses indicate a focus on backend development, database administration, and software engineering competencies.

The industrial and mechanical trades are addressed through programs such as Electrical Installation and Maintenance NC II, Automotive Servicing NC I, Automotive Servicing NC II, and Shielded Metal Arc Welding NC II. These technical programs are designed to supply qualified personnel for the construction, automotive, and manufacturing industries. The culinary and hospitality sector is represented in the curriculum by the Cookery NC II program.

=== Secondary education division ===
Operating concurrently as a basic education provider and a laboratory facility for the College of Education, the Senior High School Department offers the standard academic and technical vocational tracks established by the national basic education curriculum. The documented academic strands available to senior high school students include Science, Technology, Engineering, and Mathematics; Humanities and Social Sciences; the General Academic Strand; and Accountancy, Business, and Management. This division provides preparatory instruction for students intending to progress into the college's higher education programs or transition directly into the workforce.

== Institutional research and academic publications ==
The research output of Zamboanga del Sur Polytechnic State College encompasses pedagogical action research, student generated academic studies, curriculum development materials, and external spatial analysis utilizing the campus infrastructure.

=== Pedagogical action research ===
Faculty at the institution engage in action research aimed at analyzing and resolving instructional challenges within the technical curriculum. A documented action research project titled Enhance Students Productivity and Creativity through Computer Technology investigated the variables affecting digital literacy among students enrolled in the Internet and Computing Fundamentals subject. The research identified that students demonstrated a lack of interest in learning basic computer skills, resulting in inefficiencies in performing standard computer tasks. The study isolated the contributing factors as school computer fees, an insufficient number of computers, general lack of student interest, and issues regarding instructional competence. The hypothesis of the study posited that practical, hands on activities would heighten student engagement. Following the implementation of a one to one student to computer ratio and the introduction of applied technical activities, the evaluation phase of the research concluded that direct involvement in practical activities improved student performance, equipping them with foundational skills necessary for clerical and technical work.

=== Student theses and quantitative studies ===
Student researchers at the institution conduct studies analyzing the socio economic and academic realities of the student body. A quantitative research paper examined the influence of peer pressure on the dropout rates of secondary school students at the institution. The research problem focused on a documented 5.3 percent dropout rate among senior high school students over a three year period. The study analyzed the experiences of out of school youth in relation to peer pressure, operating on the assumption that students dropped out due to negative pressures originating from parents, guardians, and social groups. The research concluded that peer pressure from these sources contributed to students abandoning their education, leading to subsequent implications such as social stigma, lower salaries, and fewer job opportunities.

Another student generated study focused on the automotive department, titled Career Opportunities for Automotive Graduates. The researchers aimed to identify the specific employment opportunities available for students completing the automotive strand in Pagadian City. The study's objectives included determining the qualifications required for industry positions, assessing the employment status of the institution's automotive graduates, and analyzing the career advancement trajectories for individuals holding National Certificate II credentials in automotive servicing.

=== Curriculum development and Instructional materials ===
Faculty members contribute to the development of standardized instructional materials utilized beyond the institution. A specific publication originating from the college is the Catch Up Fridays Teaching Guide in English 10 with Peace Education. Published under the guidance of the Schools Division Office of Pagadian City, the teaching guide integrates peace education concepts into language instruction. The stated objective of the material is to facilitate learner reflection regarding how cultural beliefs and values influence cooperative actions and expressions, aiming to foster an inclusive learning environment.

=== External geospatial research ===
The physical infrastructure of the institution has served as a reference point in external scientific research concerning environmental risk management. The University of the Philippines Training Center for Applied Geodesy and Photogrammetry, supported by the Department of Science and Technology Grants in Aid Program, published a technical report titled LiDAR Surveys and Flood Mapping of Labangan River. This geospatial analysis mapped the flood susceptibility of various structures within the Labangan River basin, specifically evaluating buildings on the college campus. The published data classified the flood risk level of the ZSSAT Function Hall as Low and the ZSSAT High School building as Low, providing measured environmental data regarding the vulnerability of the institution's physical plant.

== Infrastructure and development ==
On 8 February 2021, the institution received forty thousand US dollar grant from international partners, facilitated by the Rotary Club of Pagadian City and the Rotary Club of Daugu-Chunma in South Korea. The funding supported the conduct of training programs and the full implementation of technical-vocational education at the institution.
