= Southern Philippines Agri-Business and Marine and Aquatic School of Technology =

Public college in Davao Occidental, Philippines

- Former names: Malita Barangay High School (1966-1968); Malita High School (1968-1982); Malita Agri-Business and Marine and Aquatic School of Technology (1982-1984)
- Type: State College
- Established: 1966; 60 years ago
- President: Dr. Lynette A. Bontia
- Vice-president: Dr. Marlyn B. Llameg (VPAA); Dr. Edelyn S. Albiso (VPAF)
- Dean: Prof. John Paul R. Pacyao (IFMS); Dr. Pedro M. Avenido (IPGS); Dr. Karen G. Cabalquinto (ITEIT); Dr. Elenito P. Bugawisan (IASDC); Dr. Jonel Mark Sarno (IHS)
- Location: Malita, Davao Occidental, Philippines; 6°25′05″N 125°36′26″E
- Campus: Malita, Kapatagan Extension, Matanao, Buhangin Extension
- Colors: Green & Golden Yellow
- Website: spamast.edu.ph
- Location in Mindanao Location in the Philippines

The Southern Philippines Agri-Business and Marine and Aquatic School of Technology, (SPAMAST), formerly known as the Malita Agri-Business and Marine and Aquatic School of Technology, is a public college in Malita, Davao Occidental, Philippines. It is mandated to provide higher technologies and vocational instruction and training in science, agricultural and industrial fields, as well as short term technical or vocational courses. It is also mandated to promote research, advance studies and progressive leadership in its areas of specialization.

Its main campus is located in Brgy. Poblacion, Malita, with a satellite campus in Brgy. Buhangin, Malita and extension classes in all municipalities of the province.

== History ==
SPAMAST traces its roots from Malita Barangay High School, created through Municipal Ordinance No. 70 on 1966 upon the initiative of former Barrio Lieutenant Juanita Ybarle vda. de Salmon and former Assemblyman Benjamin V. Bautista, Sr. On July 5, 1968 it became Malita High School through Municipal Resolution No. 80, offering a complete secondary curriculum. In 1969, a Marcos–type building with 10 rooms was constructed in a two-hectare lot donated by Mrs. De Salmon.

On February 8, 1982 through Batas Pambansa Bilang 148, the Malita High School was converted into a state college known as the Malita Agri-Business and Marine and Aquatic School of Technology (MAMAST) through the legislative efforts of Assemblyman Bautista. Engr. Ramon M. Barbon became the first College President. On March 9, 1984, Batas Pambansa Bilang 651 changed the name of MAMAST to Southern Philippines Agri-Business, Marine and Aquatic School of Technology (SPAMAST) to expand its scope and interest in the fields of agriculture and fisheries.

In 1989, SPAMAST acquired an 8-hectare land in Buhangin, Malita which is now the College of Agricultural Sciences (CAS) Campus. In 1992, the Provincial Government of Davao del Sur donated a 5.4-hectare land in Brgy. Matti, Digos City for the establishment of the Digos Campus during the administration of Dr. Francisco C. Ladaga, Sr., the second president of SPAMAST. In 1993, a 1.5-hectare land was acquired by the college along the shoreline fronting the Malita Campus. Currently extension and business initiatives hosted by the college are located within this property.

On February 21, 2019, SPAMAST Digos Campus was formally separated from the institution and transformed into the Davao del Sur State College through the enactment of Republic Act No. 11220, following the creation of the province of Davao Occidental from Davao del Sur through Republic Act No. 10360 and its plebiscite thereafter.

== Academics ==
=== Undergraduate programs ===
==== Institute of Fisheries and Marine Sciences (IFMS) ====
- Bachelor of Science in Fisheries (BSF)
- Bachelor of Science in Environmental Science (BSES), major in Coastal Ecosystems Management
- Bachelor of Science in Marine Biology (BSMB)

==== Institute of Teacher Education and Information Technology (ITEIT) ====
- Bachelor of Technology and Livelihood Education
  - Major in Agri-Fishery Arts (BSED-AFA)
  - Major in Home Economics (BSED-HE)
- Bachelor of Secondary Education
  - Major in English (BSED-ENG)
  - Major in Mathematics (BSED-MATH)
  - Major in Science (BSED-SCI)
- Bachelor of Elementary Education (BEED)
- Bachelor of Science in Information Technology (BSIT)
- Associate in Computer Technology (ACT; 2 years)

==== Institute of Agricultural Studies and Development Communication (IASDC) ====
- Bachelor of Science in Agriculture (BSA)
- Bachelor of Science in Agricultural and Biosystems Engineering (BSABE)
- Bachelor of Agricultural Technology (BAT)
- Bachelor of Science in Development Communication (BSDC)

==== Institute of Human Service (IHS) ====
- Bachelor of Science in Criminology (BSC)
- Bachelor of Science in Social Work (BSSW)

==== Institute of Business Management and Governance (IBMG) ====
- Bachelor of Science in Agribusiness (BSAB), Major in Enterprise Management
- Bachelor of Science in Office Administration (BSOA)
- Bachelor of Science in Accounting Information System (BSAIS)
- Bachelor of Public Administration (BPA)

=== Graduate and post-graduate programs ===
==== Institute of Fisheries and Marine Sciences (IFMS) ====
- Diploma in Fisheries Technology

==== Institute of Professional and Graduate Studies (IPGS) ====
- Master of Arts in Education
  - Major in Educational Management (MAEd-EM)
  - Major in Language Teaching (MAEd-LT)
  - Major in Mathematics Teaching (MAEd-MT)
  - Major in Science Teaching (MAEd-ST)
- Master in Business Administration (MBA), major in agribusiness
- Master of Science in Fisheries (MSF), major in aquaculture
- Certificate in Preschool Education (CPE)
- Certificate in Teacher Education (CTE)
- Doctor of Philosophy in Education, major in educational management (PhD-EM)
