= List of state schools, colleges and universities in the Philippines =

This is a list of state-funded schools, colleges, and universities in the Philippines. It includes national, regional, and provincial systems of colleges and universities, as well as specialized schools. It does not include locally funded schools, colleges, and universities. Enrollment figures include satellite campuses and are as of the end of the second semester of academic year 2019–2020.

Name	Location (Main campus)			President	Established	Population
Name	City	Region	Island group	President	Established	Population
University of the Philippines	Quezon City	Metro Manila	Luzon	Angelo A. Jimenez	1908	57,387
Polytechnic University of the Philippines	Manila	Metro Manila	Luzon	Manuel M. Muhi	1904	56,928
Technological University of the Philippines	Manila	Metro Manila	Luzon	Jesus Rodrigo F. Torres	1901	18,890
Philippine Normal University	Manila	Metro Manila	Luzon	Bert J. Tuga	1901	5,300
National Aviation Academy of the Philippines	Pasay	Metro Manila	Luzon	Marwin M. Dela Cruz	1969	11,020
Eulogio "Amang" Rodriguez Institute of Science and Technology	Manila	Metro Manila	Luzon	Editha V. Pillo	1945	21,536
Marikina Polytechnic College	Marikina	Metro Manila	Luzon	Joselito B. Gutierrez	1947	3,873
Rizal Technological University	Mandaluyong	Metro Manila	Luzon	Ma. Eugenia M. Yangco	1969	22,932
Don Mariano Marcos Memorial State University	Bacnotan, La Union	Ilocos Region	Luzon	Jaime I. Manuel, Jr.	1981	13,802
University of Ilocos Philippines	Santa Maria, Ilocos Sur	Ilocos Region	Luzon	Gilbert R. Arce	1998	
Mariano Marcos State University	Batac	Ilocos Region	Luzon	Virgilio Julius P. Manzano	1978	9,487
Pangasinan State University	Lingayen, Pangasinan	Ilocos Region	Luzon	Dexter R. Buted	1978	20,584
University of Northern Philippines	Vigan	Ilocos Region	Luzon	Erwin F. Cadorna	1965	7,038
Apayao State College	Conner, Apayao	Cordillera Administrative Region	Luzon	Nelia Z. Cauilan	1971	2,797
Benguet State University	La Trinidad, Benguet	Cordillera Administrative Region	Luzon	Felipe Salaing Comila	1916	7,514
Ifugao State University	Lamut, Ifugao	Cordillera Administrative Region	Luzon	Eva Marie Codamon-Dugyon	1920	5,966
Kalinga State University	Tabuk	Cordillera Administrative Region	Luzon	Eduardo T. Bagtang	2015	4,028
Mountain Province State University	Bontoc, Mountain Province	Cordillera Administrative Region	Luzon	Rexton F. Chakas	1992	3,862
Philippine Military Academy	Baguio	Cordillera Administrative Region	Luzon	Nonato Peralta Jr.	1905	
University of Abra	Lagangilang, Abra	Cordillera Administrative Region	Luzon	Gregorio T. Tuqueza Jr.	1983	
Batanes State College	Basco, Batanes	Cagayan Valley	Luzon	Alfonso R. Simon	1967	393
Cagayan State University	Tuguegarao	Cagayan Valley	Luzon	Urdujah A. Tejada	1978	22,855
Isabela State University	Echague, Isabela	Cagayan Valley	Luzon	Ricmar P. Aquino	1978	29,513
Nueva Vizcaya State University	Bayombong, Nueva Vizcaya	Cagayan Valley	Luzon	Andres Z. Taguiam	1916	9,538
Quirino State University	Diffun, Quirino	Cagayan Valley	Luzon	Samuel O. Benigno	1976	3,541
Aurora State College of Technology	Baler, Aurora	Central Luzon	Luzon	Eutiquio L. Rotaquio Jr.	1993	2,873
Bataan Peninsula State University	Balanga, Bataan	Central Luzon	Luzon	Gregorio J. Rodis	1953	12,126
Bulacan State Agricultural University	San Ildefonso, Bulacan	Central Luzon	Luzon	Jameson H. Tan	1974	
Bulacan State University	Malolos	Central Luzon	Luzon	Cecilia N. Gascon	1904	36,955
Central Luzon State University	Muñoz	Central Luzon	Luzon	Edgar A. Orden	1907	10,427
Pampanga State University	Bacolor, Pampanga	Central Luzon	Luzon	Enrique G. Baking	1861	
Nueva Ecija University of Science and Technology	Cabanatuan	Central Luzon	Luzon	Feliciana B. Jacoba	1908	22,597
Pampanga State Agricultural University	Magalang, Pampanga	Central Luzon	Luzon	Honorio M. Soriano, Jr.	1974	5,144
Philippine Merchant Marine Academy	San Narciso, Zambales	Central Luzon	Luzon	Commo. Joel Y. Abutal, PMMA (Superintendent)	1820	1,104
President Ramon Magsaysay State University	Iba, Zambales	Central Luzon	Luzon	Cornelio C. Garcia	1910	10,513
Tarlac Agricultural University	Camiling, Tarlac	Central Luzon	Luzon	Max P. Guillermo	1945	5,210
Tarlac State University	Tarlac City	Central Luzon	Luzon	Myrna Q. Mallari	1906	16,528
Batangas State University	Batangas City	Calabarzon	Luzon	Tirso A. Ronquillo	1903	33,076
Cavite State University	Indang, Cavite	Calabarzon	Luzon	Hernando D. Robles	1906	43,634
Laguna State Polytechnic University	Santa Cruz, Laguna	Calabarzon	Luzon	Mario R. Briones	1952	24,248
Southern Luzon State University	Lucban, Quezon	Calabarzon	Luzon	Frederick T. Villa	1964	14,851
University of Rizal System	Tanay, Rizal	Calabarzon	Luzon	Marita R. Canapi	2001	18,663
Marinduque State University	Boac, Marinduque	Mimaropa	Luzon	Merian P. Catajay-Mani	1953	
Mindoro State University	Victoria, Oriental Mindoro	Mimaropa	Luzon	Levy B. Arago	1951	
Occidental Mindoro State University	San Jose, Occidental Mindoro	Mimaropa	Luzon	Elbert C. Edaniol	1966	
Palawan State University	Puerto Princesa	Mimaropa	Luzon	Ramon M. Docto	1965	17,979
Romblon State University	Odiongan, Romblon	Mimaropa	Luzon	Arnulfo F. de Luna	1915	10,577
Western Philippines University	Aborlan, Palawan	Mimaropa	Luzon	Julie Hope Timotea P. Evina	1910	9,324
Bicol University	Legazpi	Bicol Region	Luzon	Arnulfo M. Mascariñas	1969	17,569
University of Camarines Norte	Daet, Camarines Norte	Bicol Region	Luzon	Marlo M. De La Cruz	1992	9,648
Camarines Sur Polytechnic Colleges	Nabua, Camarines Sur	Bicol Region	Luzon	Charlito P. Cadag	1983	
Catanduanes State University	Virac, Catanduanes	Bicol Region	Luzon	Minerva I. Morales	1961	6,450
Central Bicol State University of Agriculture	Pili, Camarines Sur	Bicol Region	Luzon	Alberto N. Naperi	1918	9,312
Dr. Emilio B. Espinosa Sr. Memorial State College of Agriculture and Technology	Mandaon, Masbate	Bicol Region	Luzon	Arnel Brosas Millesca	1952	
Partido State University	Goa, Camarines Sur	Bicol Region	Luzon	Raul G. Bradecina	2001	5,200
Rinconada State College	Baao, Camarines Sur	Bicol Region	Luzon		2025	
Sorsogon State University	Sorsogon City	Bicol Region	Luzon	Helen R. Lara	1907	
Southeast Asian University of Technology	Naga	Bicol Region	Luzon	Alex H. Navarroza	1911	
Aklan State University	Banga, Aklan	Western Visayas	Visayas	Jeffrey A. Clarin	1917	6,984
Capiz State University	Roxas City	Western Visayas	Visayas	Efren L. Linan	1980	13,974
Guimaras State University	Buenavista, Guimaras	Western Visayas	Visayas	Lilian Diana B. Parreño	1968	
Iloilo Science and Technology University	Iloilo City	Western Visayas	Visayas	Gabriel M. Salistre	1905	11,676
Iloilo State University of Fisheries Science and Technology	Barotac Nuevo, Iloilo	Western Visayas	Visayas	Nordy D. Siason, Jr.	1957	
Northern Iloilo State University	Estancia, Iloilo	Western Visayas	Visayas	Bobby D. Gerardo	1957	
University of Antique	Sibalom, Antique	Western Visayas	Visayas	Pablo S. Crespo, Jr.	1954	11,904
University of the Philippines Visayas	Miagao, Iloilo	Western Visayas	Visayas	Clement C. Camposano, Chancellor	1947	
West Visayas State University	Iloilo City	Western Visayas	Visayas	Joselito F. Villaruz	1902	12,641
Philippine Normal University Visayas	Cadiz	Negros Island Region	Visayas	Marites C. Geronimo, Director	1968	
State University of Northern Negros	Sagay	Negros Island Region	Visayas	Renante A. Egcas	1998	
Carlos Hilado Memorial State University	Talisay	Negros Island Region	Visayas	Norberto P. Mangulabnan	1954	
Central Philippines State University	Kabankalan	Negros Island Region	Visayas	Aladino C. Moraca	1946	10,878
Technological University of the Philippines Visayas	Talisay	Negros Island Region	Visayas	Eric A. Malo-oy, Director	1977	
Bohol Island State University	Tagbilaran	Central Visayas	Visayas	Anthony M. Penaso	1998	15,417
Negros Oriental State University	Dumaguete	Negros Island Region	Visayas	Noel Marjon E. Yasi	1907	25,804
Siquijor State College	Larena, Siquijor	Negros Island Region	Visayas	Steven J. Sumaylo	1920	1,773
Cebu Normal University	Cebu City	Central Visayas	Visayas	Daniel A. Ariaso, Sr.	1902	6,675
Cebu Technological University	Cebu City	Central Visayas	Visayas	Joseph C. Pepito	1911	41,395
University of the Philippines Cebu	Cebu City	Central Visayas	Visayas	Leo B. Malagar, Chancellor	1918	
Biliran Province State University	Naval, Biliran	Eastern Visayas	Visayas	Victor C. Cañezo, Jr.	1945	7,572
Eastern Samar State University	Borongan, Eastern Samar	Eastern Visayas	Visayas	Andres C. Pagatpatan, Jr.	1960	13,866
Eastern Visayas State University	Tacloban	Eastern Visayas	Visayas	Dennis C. de Paz	1907	18,860
Leyte Normal University	Tacloban	Eastern Visayas	Visayas	Evelyn B. Aguirre	1921	6,499
Northwest Samar State University	Calbayog	Eastern Visayas	Visayas	Benjamin L. Pecayo	1959	7,814
Palompon Institute of Technology	Palompon, Leyte	Eastern Visayas	Visayas	Dennis A. Del Pilar	1964	
Samar State University	Catbalogan	Eastern Visayas	Visayas	Redentor S. Palencia	1912	6,882
Southern Leyte State University	Sogod, Southern Leyte	Eastern Visayas	Visayas	Jude A. Duarte	1912	9,772
University of Eastern Philippines	Catarman, Northern Samar	Eastern Visayas	Visayas	Cherry I. Ultra	1956	7,291
University of the Philippines Tacloban	Tacloban	Eastern Visayas	Visayas	Patricia B. Arinto, Dean	1973	7,291
Visayas State University	Baybay	Eastern Visayas	Visayas	Prose Ivy G. Yepes	1924	12,098
Zamboanga del Sur State University	San Miguel, Zamboanga del Sur	Zamboanga Peninsula	Mindanao	Edgardo H. Rosales	1995	
Zamboanga del Sur Polytechnic State College	Pagadian	Zamboanga Peninsula	Mindanao		2025	
Jose Rizal Memorial State University	Dapitan	Zamboanga Peninsula	Mindanao	Nelson P. Cabral, OIC	1996	17,194
Mindanao State University–Zamboanga Sibugay	Buug, Zamboanga Sibugay	Zamboanga Peninsula	Mindanao	Sheila G. Magolama, Chancellor	1971	
Sulu State University	Jolo, Sulu	Zamboanga Peninsula	Mindanao	Charisma S. Ututalum	1982	3,785
Western Mindanao State University	Zamboanga City	Zamboanga Peninsula	Mindanao	Ma. Carla A. Ochotorena	1904	26,706
Zamboanga Peninsula Polytechnic State University	Zamboanga City	Zamboanga Peninsula	Mindanao	Nelson P. Cabral	1905	
Zamboanga State College of Marine Sciences and Technology	Zamboanga City	Zamboanga Peninsula	Mindanao	Jaime G. Jalon	1956	4,530
Bukidnon State University	Malaybalay	Northern Mindanao	Mindanao	Joy M. Mirasol	1924	15,164
Camiguin Polytechnic State College	Mambajao, Camiguin	Northern Mindanao	Mindanao	Macario B. Oclarit	1995	2,267
Central Mindanao University	Maramag, Bukidnon	Northern Mindanao	Mindanao	Rolito G. Eballe	1910	9,367
Iligan City Polytechnic State College	Iligan	Northern Mindanao	Mindanao	Ronillo Apas Sr.	2021	
Mindanao State University–Iligan Institute of Technology	Iligan	Northern Mindanao	Mindanao	Alizedney M. Ditucalan, Chancellor	1968	
Mindanao State University–Sultan Naga Dimaporo	Sultan Naga Dimaporo, Lanao del Norte	Northern Mindanao	Mindanao		2022	
Misamis Occidental State College	Oroquieta	Northern Mindanao	Mindanao		2018	
Northern Bukidnon State College	Manolo Fortich, Bukidnon	Northern Mindanao	Mindanao	Catherine Roween C. Almaden	2005	
University of Northwestern Mindanao	Tangub	Northern Mindanao	Mindanao	Reynaldo E. Manuel Jr.	1971	3,418
University of Science and Technology of Southern Philippines	Alubijid, Misamis Oriental	Northern Mindanao	Mindanao	Ambrosio B. Cultura II	2016	11,085
Davao de Oro State College	Compostela, Davao de Oro	Davao Region	Mindanao	Christie Jean V. Ganiera	2013	
Davao del Norte State College	Panabo	Davao Region	Mindanao	Joy M. Sorrosa	1995	3,542
Davao del Sur State College	Digos	Davao Region	Mindanao	Augie E. Fuentes	2019	
Davao Oriental State University	Mati	Davao Region	Mindanao	Roy G. Ponce	1989	
Southern Philippines Agri-Business and Marine and Aquatic School of Technology	Malita, Davao Occidental	Davao Region	Mindanao	Ruth S. Lucero	1984	5,942
University of Southeastern Philippines	Davao City	Davao Region	Mindanao	Lourdes C. Generalao	1978	9,126
Cotabato Foundation College of Science and Technology	Arakan, Cotabato	Soccsksargen	Mindanao	Ali K. Dilangalen	1967	3,456
University of Southern Mindanao	Kabacan, Cotabato	Soccsksargen	Mindanao	Jonald L. Pimentel, Ph.D.	1952	13,873
Mindanao State University–General Santos	General Santos	Soccsksargen	Mindanao	Shidik T. Abantas, LL.M., MDM	1967	
South Cotabato State College	Surallah, South Cotabato	Soccsksargen	Mindanao	Edward Lovell B. Brillantes, Ph.D.	2018	
Sultan Kudarat State University	Tacurong	Soccsksargen	Mindanao	Samson L. Molao, Ed.D.	1990	8,795
Agusan del Sur State University	Bunawan, Agusan del Sur	Caraga	Mindanao	Joy C. Capistrano	1908	
Caraga State University	Butuan	Caraga	Mindanao	Rolyn C. Daguil	1946	8,448
North Eastern Mindanao State University	Tandag	Caraga	Mindanao	Baceledes R. Estal	1982	
Surigao del Norte State University	Surigao City	Caraga	Mindanao	Gregorio Z. Gamboa, Jr.	1998	
Adiong Memorial State College	Ditsaan-Ramain, Lanao del Sur	Bangsamoro	Mindanao	Sherifa Rohannie O. Kadil-Adiong	1999	
Basilan State University	Isabela, Basilan	Bangsamoro	Mindanao	Haipa Abdurahim-Salain	1984	
Cotabato State University	Cotabato City	Bangsamoro	Mindanao	Sema G. Dilna	1983	
Mindanao State University–Maguindanao	Datu Odin Sinsuat, Maguindanao del Norte	Bangsamoro	Mindanao	Bai Hejira Nefertiti S. Macalandong-Limbona, Chancellor	1973	
Mindanao State University Main	Marawi	Bangsamoro	Mindanao	Basari D. Mapupuno	1961	
Mindanao State University–Tawi-Tawi College of Technology and Oceanography	Bongao, Tawi-Tawi	Bangsamoro	Mindanao	Mary Joyce Z. Guinto-Sali, Chancellor	1982	
Tawi-Tawi Regional Agricultural College	Bongao, Tawi-Tawi	Bangsamoro	Mindanao	Mutti Asaali	1957	2,894
