= Misamis Occidental State College =

State-funded of higher learning in Misamis Occidental, Philippines

- Kolehiyo ng Estado sa Misamis Occidental (Filipino)
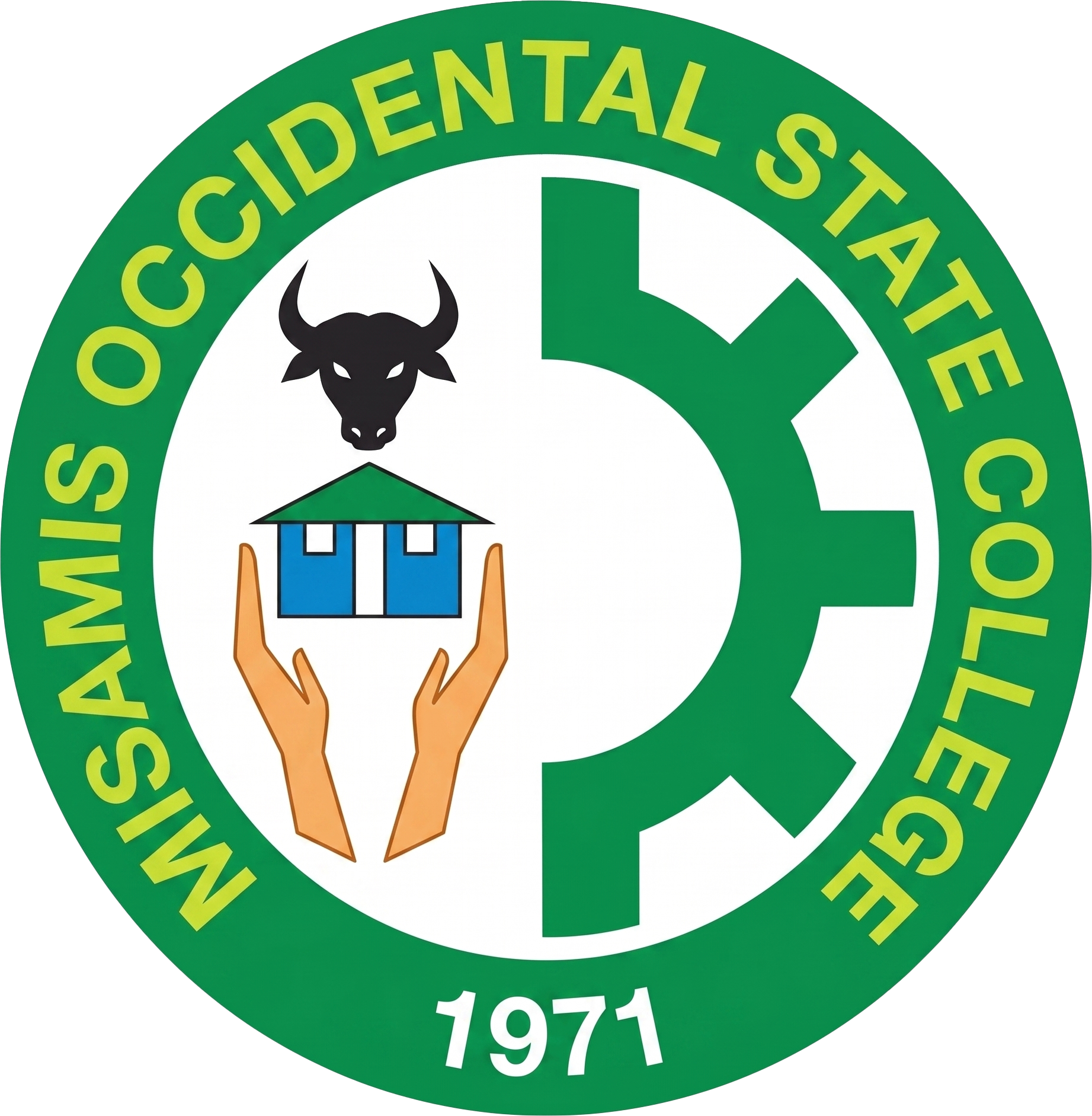
- Former name: Oroquieta Agro-Industrial School (1967‑2019)
- Type: State college
- Established: 2019; 7 years ago
- Location: Oroquieta, Misamis Occidental, 7207, Philippines; 8°28′15″N 123°46′06″E
- Website: www.tesdaoais.com
- Location in Mindanao Location in the Philippines

Misamis Occidental State College is a public state college located in the province of Misamis Occidental, Philippines. The main campus of the institution is situated in Barangay Villaflor within the jurisdiction of Oroquieta, Misamis Occidental. The college serves as a provider of higher professional instruction, technical vocational training, and advanced studies for the province and the broader Northern Mindanao region. Originally established as a secondary agricultural and industrial school in 1967, the institution operated for several decades under the administration of the Department of Education, and subsequently under the Technical Education and Skills Development Authority (TESDA), before being converted into a chartered state college through Republic Act No. 11282.

== History ==
=== Oroquieta Agro-Industrial School ===
The institution traces its origins to the enactment of Republic Act No. 4941 on June 17, 1967, which legally created the Oroquieta Agro-Industrial School. The legislation mandated the establishment of an agricultural and industrial high school in the municipality of Oroquieta. The school was placed under the direct supervision of the Director of Vocational Education, an office within the national education apparatus. Section 3 of Republic Act No. 4941 authorized an initial appropriation of one hundred fifty thousand pesos, drawn from the National Treasury, to fund the establishment, operation, and maintenance of the school during the 1967 fiscal year. Following this initial funding allocation, the financial requirements for the continued operation of the school were integrated into the annual General Appropriations Act of the national government.

Upon its inception, the Oroquieta Agro-Industrial School operated at its first campus site located in Clarin Settlement, Oroquieta City. During its initial decades of operation, the school offered secondary curricula focused on agricultural and industrial courses. The institution functioned under the administrative jurisdiction of the Department of Education, Culture and Sports (DECS), providing basic secondary education integrated with vocational trade skills to the residents of Oroquieta and neighboring municipalities.

A major administrative transition occurred in the late 1990s following the reorganization of the Philippine technical education sector. On August 24, 1998, the supervision and administration of the Oroquieta Agro-Industrial School were formally transferred from the Department of Education to the Technical Education and Skills Development Authority. This transfer was executed pursuant to Republic Act No. 7796, also known as the TESDA Act of 1994, which aimed to consolidate technical vocational education and training programs across the country. Following this transfer, the institution became the sole technical vocational school administered directly by the Technical Education and Skills Development Authority in the province of Misamis Occidental.

Under the new administrative framework, the institution underwent a rationalization of its secondary education programs in 2002. The school transitioned away from providing basic high school education to focus entirely on post-secondary technical vocational education and training. The institutional framework adopted the training standards, testing protocols, and competency-based curricula promulgated by the national board of the Technical Education and Skills Development Authority. The school functioned as a designated technology institution, acting as a direct training provider and a testing center for new instructional modalities.

During its tenure as an administered school under the Technical Education and Skills Development Authority, the institution received the Bronze Award of the Philippine Quality Assurance in 2004. The school implemented established quality manual procedures in its daily operations and adhered to the delivery standards contained in the official citizen charter. The institution was identified by national education authorities as a Center of Excellence for animal production. Funding and student support during this era were facilitated through national scholarship programs, including the Training for Work Scholarship Program, the Special Training for Employment Program, and the Private Education Student Financial Assistance program, which provided educational grants to qualified students in nondegree courses.

=== Conversion to a state college ===
The conversion of the Oroquieta Agro-Industrial School into a state college was a protracted legislative process that culminated in the passage of Republic Act No. 11282. This statute, which served as its charter was approved by the president, Rodrigo Duterte, on April 12, 2019.

The transition from a technical vocational school to a chartered state college required compliance with strict regulatory frameworks established by the Commission on Higher Education. Section 17 of Republic Act No. 11282 stipulated that the conversion would only become fully effective upon the determination and declaration by the Commission on Higher Education that the institution had complied with the specific requirements for college status. These requirements were based on Memorandum Order No. 46, series of 2012, issued by the Commission on Higher Education, which outlines the policy standard to enhance quality assurance in Philippine higher education through an outcomes-based and typology-based classification. The law required an evaluation by a constituted panel of experts to verify compliance. Until the Commission formally granted the state college status, the institution was mandated to retain its prior status as an administered school under the Technical Education and Skills Development Authority.

The institution is required by its charter to initiate specific organizational changes. Within this 120-day timeframe, the college was required to submit a five-year development plan, including a corresponding program budget, to the Commission on Higher Education for recommendation to the Department of Budget and Management. The institution was also required to undergo a management audit supervised by the Commission on Higher Education. Furthermore, the administration was tasked with setting up the organizational, administrative, and academic structures of the new college, which included the appointment of key officials and the establishment of at least four distinct academic departments or colleges. For suppletory application during this transition phase, Republic Act No. 8292, known as the Higher Education Modernization Act of 1997, was made an integral part of the governing charter of the college.

By May 2026, the full operationalization of the Misamis Occidental State College entered its final stages of implementation. High-level meetings were conducted in Cagayan de Oro and Davao City to finalize the regulatory and administrative frameworks in coordination with national education and budget authorities. During this phase, the Department of Budget and Management presented the recommended plantilla positions required to hire the academic faculty and administrative staff for the college. The Implementing Rules and Regulations of the college underwent regional reviews to secure the final endorsement from both the Commission on Higher Education and the Technical Education and Skills Development Authority, completing the transition mandated under Republic Act No. 11282.

== Governance structure ==
The governance, administration, and exercise of corporate powers of the Misamis Occidental State College are vested exclusively in the board of trustees and the president of the college.

=== Board of trustees ===
The board of trustees is the highest policy-making body of the institution. According to Section 5 of Republic Act No. 11282, the board is composed of specific ex officio and appointed members representing various government agencies and sectoral stakeholders1. The board is chaired by the chairperson of the Commission on Higher Education. The president of the college serves as the vice chairperson of the board.

The legislative branch is represented on the board by the chairperson of the Committee on Education, Arts and Culture of the Senate, and the chairperson of the Committee on Basic Education and Culture of the House of Representatives. The executive branch is represented by four regional directors from Region 10, specifically the directors from the Department of Economy, Planning, and Development (DEPDev), the Technical Education and Skills Development Authority, the Department of Science and Technology, and the Department of Agriculture. Internal college stakeholders are represented by the president of the faculty association, the president of the student council, and the president of the alumni association. The term of office for these three representatives is coterminous with their respective terms of office in their sector associations, as defined by their internal constitutions and bylaws. The board includes two prominent citizens from the province of Misamis Occidental. These citizens must have distinguished themselves in their professions or fields of specialization relevant to the academic offerings of the college. They are selected from a list of at least five qualified persons recommended by a search committee. This search committee is constituted by the college president in consultation with the chairperson of the Commission on Higher Education and other board members. The two prominent citizens serve a fixed term of two years from the date of their appointment.

The board of trustees is required to convene regularly at least once every quarter. Section 7 of Republic Act No. 11282 authorize the board to promulgate and implement policies in accordance with the declared state policies on education, science, and technology. The board is required to adopt and implement a socialized scheme of tuition and school fees to facilitate greater access for poor but deserving students, in accordance with Republic Act No. 10931, the Universal Access to Quality Tertiary Education Act.

To expand educational access, the board has the authority to establish and absorb nonchartered tertiary institutions within Misamis Occidental as branches and centers, in coordination with the Commission on Higher Education and the Department of Budget and Management. The board may establish research and extension centers, set up professorial chairs, and provide fellowships for qualified faculty members.

=== The college president ===
The administration of the college is led by the college president. The president is appointed by the board of trustees upon the recommendation of a duly constituted search committee. The term of office for the president is four years, and the incumbent is eligible for reappointment to another term.

The president is assisted by a vice president for academic affairs and a vice president for administration. These vice presidents are appointed by the board of trustees upon the specific recommendation of the college president.

=== Academic and administrative councils ===
Internal governance and policy formulation at the operational level are managed through two distinct councils. Section 10 of the college charter creates an administrative council. This council is chaired by the president and composed of the vice presidents, deans, directors, and other officials of equal rank. The administrative council is tasked with reviewing and recommending policies governing the administration, management, and development of the college for approval by the board of trustees.

Section 11 creates the academic council. Also chaired by the president, this council is composed of all academic staff holding a rank not lower than assistant professor. The academic council has the statutory power to review and recommend curricular offerings, fix the requirements for the admission and graduation of students, and formulate rules of discipline for board action.

=== Administrative officers ===
Section 12 of the charter requires the board of trustees to appoint a college secretary. The secretary serves both the board and the college administration6. The duties of the secretary include keeping all records and proceedings of the board and serving notices of board meetings. Under Section 13, the treasurer of the Philippines serves as the ex officio treasurer of the college.

== Research output and institutional achievements ==
The integration of research into the instructional framework is a primary objective of the Misamis Occidental State College, shifting from purely vocational instruction to scholarly output and technological innovation. Section 2 of the college charter explicitly identifies research leadership in agriculture, fishery, engineering, arts, and sciences as a core institutional mandate.

A prominent example of pedagogical research emerging from the institution is a 2025 study conducted by Daphne D. Beniga, an Assistant Professor IV at the college. The research, published in the International Journal of Innovative Research in Engineering & Multidisciplinary Physical Sciences, is titled "Effectiveness of TVET-Trained Instructors at Oroquieta Agro-Industrial School (OAIS): Its Relationship to Students' Skills Acquisition". The study utilized a descriptive correlational research design to explore the relationship between the competency of instructors and the acquisition of cognitive, technical, and practical skills by students. The study assessed instructor effectiveness across several variables: pedagogical skills, technical expertise, instructional methods, assessment and feedback mechanisms, industry relevance, student engagement, and ongoing professional development. Demographic variables of the instructors, including age, sex, level of education, years of experience, and frequency of training, were also analyzed. Data collection involved structured surveys administered to both students and technical vocational instructors, utilizing statistical tools such as frequency counts, arithmetic means, and Spearman’s rank correlation coefficient to identify the strength and direction of the relationship between variables. The research instrument underwent content validation by education specialists and a pilot test was conducted to measure internal consistency using Cronbach’s Alpha. The findings of the 2025 study revealed that instructors at the institution demonstrated high effectiveness, particularly in pedagogical skills, technical expertise, and instructional methods. Consequently, students exhibited strong skills acquisition across all measured domains, including competency-based learning, retention and transferability, self-efficacy, and collaboration. The statistical analysis identified a strong positive correlation between instructor effectiveness and student skill acquisition, demonstrating the necessity of well-trained instructors in fostering hands-on learning. The study recommended continuous professional development, strict curriculum alignment with industry demands, stronger partnerships with employers, increased funding, and community awareness to enhance the quality of technical education. Beniga was previously recognized by the Technical Education and Skills Development Authority in 2022, receiving the regional Tagsanay Award for excellence in technical vocational instruction.

Beyond academic research, the institution engages in practical technical innovation and community extension programs. In January 2023, under the leadership of Vocational School Administrator Engr. Lee R. Catane and School Nurse Abigail Krista P. Mutia, the institution fabricated twenty-five intravenous pole stands made from mahogany wood and scrap materials. These fabricated medical devices were donated to the Misamis Occidental Provincial Hospital to address equipment shortages. Engr. Lee R. Catane also initiated values formation programs for employees and Training Induction Programs for the provincial jail.

In February 2023, the local government unit of Ramon Magsaysay, Zamboanga del Sur, conducted a benchmarking activity at the campus to observe best practices in implementing technical education policies. In March 2025, a delegation from the college, including Engr. Lee R. Catane, Daphne D. Beniga, Engr. Harley Gil D. Saren, and Librarian Riza D. Eyas, conducted a reciprocal benchmarking activity at South Cotabato State College. This activity was aimed at understanding the specific administrative processes required to secure recognition from the Commission on Higher Education as a Higher Education Institution, drawing on the experience of South Cotabato State College in navigating a similar transition under a different legislative charter.

The college incorporates modern digital tools into its agricultural programs. Instructors from the institution have participated in programs such as the Digital Agriculture Course for Rice Competitiveness Enhancement Fund, training farmers in the use of applications like the Minus-One Element Technique app, Leaf Color Chart app, and Rice Crop Manager Advisory Services, as well as teaching social media marketing strategies for agricultural products using content creation platforms. The campus is officially designated as a Learning Site for Agriculture by the Agricultural Training Institute of the Department of Agriculture.
