= Davao del Sur State College =

State college in Davao del Sur, Philippines

- Kolehiyo ng Estado sa Davao del Sur (Filipino)
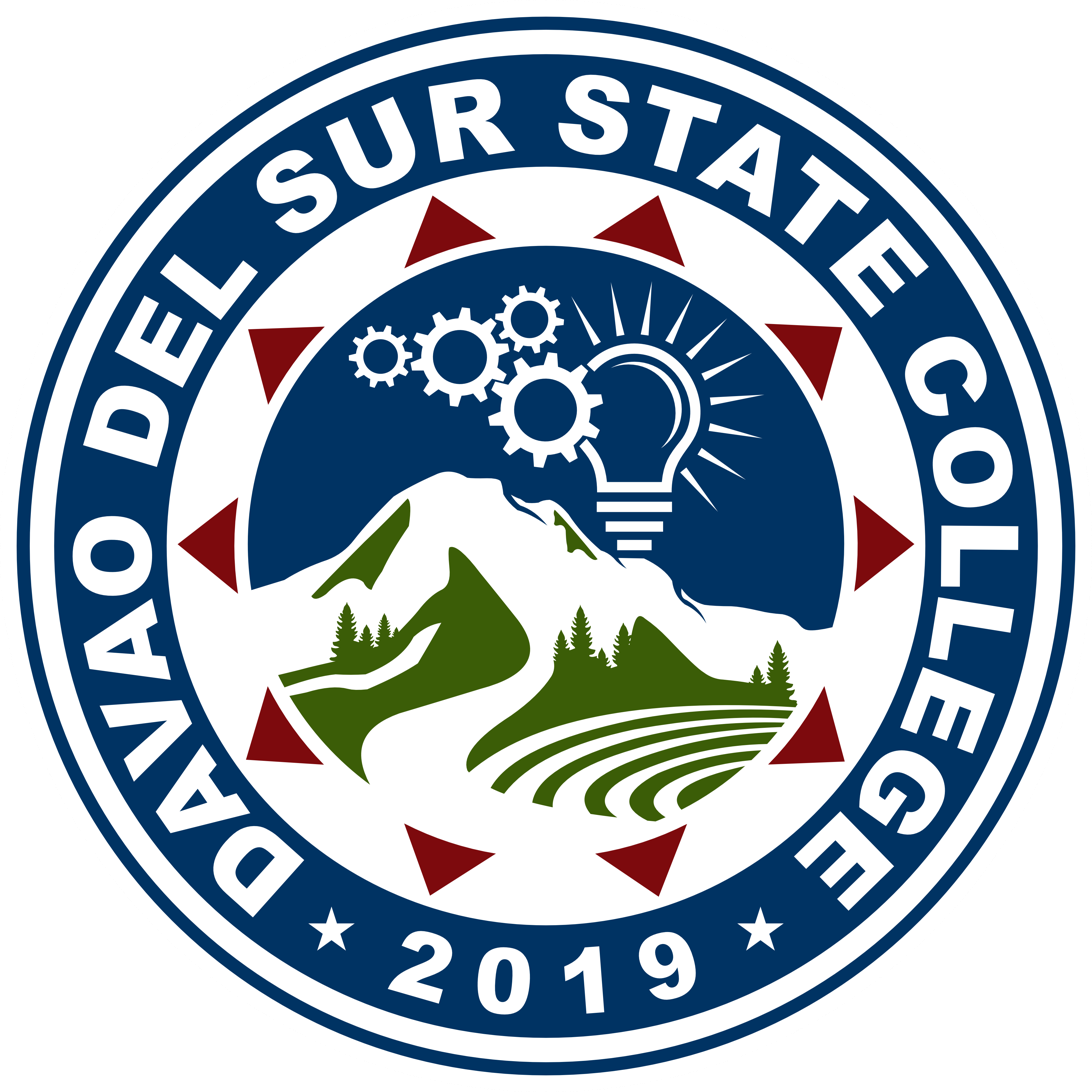
- Former names: Southern Philippines Agri-Business and Marine and Aquatic School of Technology–Digos Campus (1989‑2019)
- Type: State college
- Established: 2019; 7 years ago
- Location: Digos, Davao del Sur, 8002, Philippines; 6°45′29″N 125°18′34″E
- Website: dssc.edu.ph
- Location in Mindanao Location in the Philippines

Davao del Sur State College (DSSC) is a public state college in the Philippines, based at Barangay Matti, Digos City, Davao del Sur. Recognized as the sole state college in the province of Davao del Sur, the institution provides advanced instruction and professional training across multiple disciplines, focusing on agriculture, agribusiness, engineering, education, and information technology. Originally established as a satellite campus of the Southern Philippines Agri-Business and Marine and Aquatic School of Technology (SPAMAST), the institution gained its independence and full state college status on February 21, 2019, following the enactment of Republic Act No. 11220. The college operates a main campus in Digos City alongside multiple extension campuses in the municipalities of Matanao, Sulop, Kapatagan, Malalag, and Santa Cruz. The institution integrates research, extension services, and production activities to support the socioeconomic development of the Davao Region.

== History ==
=== SPAMAST campus ===
The origins of Davao del Sur State College trace back to 1989 when the institution functioned as the Digos campus of the Southern Philippines Agri-Business and Marine and Aquatic School of Technology (SPAMAST), a public educational institution originally headquartered in the municipality of Malita. The initial development of the Digos campus occurred under the administration of Dr. Francisco C. Ladaga, Sr., the second president of SPAMAST. During this period, the administration acquired 17.5 hectares of land in Barangay Matti, Digos City, for agricultural instruction and laboratory work. The land acquisition was facilitated through private donations and property transfers from the Provincial Local Government Unit of Davao del Sur.

The institution expanded its geographic footprint in 1995 to accommodate requirements for agricultural production, research, and extension services. The administration acquired an additional land parcel measuring between 28 and 30 hectares in the municipality of Matanao, Davao del Sur. This secondary site was designed to function as a dedicated production and laboratory area, reinforcing the capacity of the institution to support local agricultural development. By the year 2000, SPAMAST initiated a structural reorganization of its academic divisions. Due to the expansion of academic offerings, the Digos campus was formally reorganized and renamed the College of Agricultural Sciences, with the Matanao property officially designated as its primary laboratory and production site.

=== Separation as state college ===
The legislative effort to convert the Digos campus into an independent state college was influenced by external political developments. Following the division of the original Davao del Sur province, the municipality of Malita became part of the newly created province of Davao Occidental. SPAMAST's main campus fell outside the territorial jurisdiction of Davao del Sur, leaving the latter province without a dedicated, independent public state college.

Representatives from the province initiated legislative measures to separate the Digos campus from the SPAMAST system. On October 3, 2016, Davao Occidental Representative Lorna Bautista-Bandigan filed House Bill No. 3927, proposing the removal of the Digos City campus from SPAMAST and its conversion into a separate entity. On March 14, 2017, Davao del Sur Representative Mercedes Cagas filed House Bill No. 5243 with a similar objective.

The legislators agreed to consolidate their respective proposals, resulting in House Bill 6715. This consolidated bill aimed to separate the Digos campus from the SPAMAST facility in Malita, Davao Occidental, and convert it into the Davao del Sur State College. The House of Representatives approved the bill on December 11, 2017. The Senate requested a conference committee to finalize the bill on August 28, 2018, and approved the resulting committee report on November 27, 2018. The bicameral Congress ratified the final version of the bill the following day.

President Rodrigo Duterte signed the bill into law on February 21, 2019, officially enacting Republic Act No. 11220. The enactment established Davao del Sur State College, registering it as the 112th public higher education institution in the Philippines.

Following the enactment of Republic Act No. 11220, the institution underwent a certification process administered by the Commission on Higher Education (CHED). The Commission evaluated the compliance of the college with regulatory standards and certified the conversion through CHED En Banc Resolution No. 494-2019, issued on August 13, 2019.

To manage the transition period, CHED Region XI Director Dr. Maricar Casquejo was designated as the officer-in-charge of the college, serving from December 12, 2019 to September 27, 2020. Upon the conclusion of the search process for a permanent executive, the board of trustees approved the appointment of Dr. Augie E. Fuentes as the first official president of the College on September 28, 2020. Operational restrictions imposed during the global pandemic delayed the formal investiture and oath-taking ceremony for Dr. Fuentes until March 17, 2022, when it was held at the Davao del Sur Coliseum in the presence of local government officials, including then governor Marc Cagas.

== Governance and the board of trustees ==
The operations, administration, and regulatory obligations of Davao del Sur State College are governed by Republic Act No. 11220, also known as its charter. Section 2 of the statute outlines the general mandate of the college, specifying that the institution must primarily provide advanced instruction and professional training in education, agriculture, engineering and technology, agribusiness, information technology, and other related fields of study. The law explicitly requires the college to undertake research, extension services, and production activities that support the socioeconomic development of the province.

Section 5 of this charter vests the corporate powers and administration of the college exclusively in the board of trustees and the president. The board functions as the primary governing body and holds the authority to execute the general powers of a corporation under the Corporation Code of the Philippines.

The membership of the board of trustees is statutorily defined to include specific representatives: The chairperson of the Commission on Higher Education (CHED), serving as the board chairperson. The president of the college, serving as the Vice chairperson. Members of the board include the chairperson of the Senate Committee on Education, Arts and Culture, the chairperson of the House Committee on Higher and Technical Education, the regional director of the Department of Economy, Planning, and Development, the regional director of the Department of Science and Technology (DOST), the regional director of the Department of Agriculture (DA), the respective Presidents of the faculty association, student council, and alumni association, serving for the duration of their elected terms. Membership also includes two prominent citizens from the private sector who have distinguished themselves in their professions, appointed by the board from a list of at least five qualified persons recommended by a search committee.

The board is granted administrative powers to direct the fiscal and academic trajectory of the institution. These powers include the authority to receive and appropriate funding, administer trusts and legacies, adopt socialized tuition schemes, and adjust the salaries of faculty and administrative staff in accordance with the Revised Compensation and Position Classification System3. The board holds the power to approve curricula, authorize external management audits, establish professorial chairs, award fellowships and scholarships, and enter into joint ventures with business and industry to manage the economic assets of the college.

=== Asset transfers and fiscal exemptions ===
Republic Act No. 11220 mandated the complete transfer of all real and personal assets, personnel, and records from the specified SPAMAST campuses (Digos, Matanao, Kapatagan, and Sulop) to the newly formed state college. The charter dictated that parcels of government land occupied by the Digos City campus be officially declared as property of the college and titled under its name. Existing liabilities and obligations associated with the integrated campuses were legally transferred to the new institution. The legislation specified that faculty members and personnel employed prior to the conversion retained their positions, rights, and security of tenure.

To facilitate fiscal operations, the law grants specific tax exemptions to the college. Revenues and assets used exclusively for educational purposes are exempt from taxes, and any grants, endowments, or donations received by the college are deductible for donor and income tax computations. The college is authorized to import books, publications, and machinery duty-free, provided they are used directly for educational or research purposes12. Income generated from tuition fees and auxiliary services is retained by the college as a special trust fund, which the board may disburse for instruction, research, and infrastructure projects.

== Campus infrastructure and facilities ==
Davao del Sur State College operates a distributed campus model, maintaining a central hub in Digos City supported by multiple extension sites. This geographic distribution allows the institution to deliver tertiary education across rural and agricultural municipalities.

=== Digos campus ===
The main campus is located in Barangay Matti, Digos City. It serves as the central administrative and academic headquarters, housing the majority of the undergraduate programs, the Graduate School, and the central administrative offices, including the Office of the Vice President for Academic Affairs. The campus encompasses the original 17.5 hectares acquired during the founding of the institution.

=== Extension campuses ===
To extend academic access beyond the provincial capital, the college operates several recognized extension campuses

==== Matanao ====
Utilizing the 28 to 30 hectares acquired in 1995, this site functions primarily as a laboratory and production area for the agricultural sciences, offering diploma and certificate programs.

==== Sulop ====
Located in the municipality of Sulop, this campus offers four-year degree programs in public administration, agribusiness, and information technology.

==== Santa Cruz ====
Inaugurated on August 8, 2023, this facility operates in coordination with the local government of Santa Cruz. It was established to offer specialized courses in information technology and agribusiness, opening with an initial cohort of 150 resident students. The inauguration involved Santa Cruz Mayor Nelson Sala and CHED Commissioner Aldrin Darilag.

==== Kapatagan and Malalag ====
Recognized in the institutional history and legislative records, these sites host extension classes intended to service remote populations. The college entered a Memorandum of Agreement with the Local Government Unit of Malalag on April 18, 2026, to implement the Electronic Human Resource Management Information System (eHRMIS), indicating administrative integration with the municipality.

== Infrastructure ==
In response to infrastructure requirements, the college has initiated specific construction projects. On January 13, 2021, the administration announced the development of a ₱10 million virtual library, funded through the General Appropriations Act of 2022. The virtual library was designed to provide access to electronic books, journals, and digital resources, supporting research and meeting the physical standards required for Certificates of Program Compliance (COPC).

On February 20, 2026, the college commenced the construction of a three-story academic building for the College of Business Education and Governance (CBEG). Located at the expansion site across the river in Digos City, the facility aims to alleviate spatial pressures caused by sustained enrollment growth and program expansion.

== Academic organization and course offerings ==
The academic structure of the college is governed by the Office of the Vice President for Academic Affairs (OVPAA). The OVPAA oversees curricular development, instructional implementation, and compliance with the standards set by the Accrediting Agency of Chartered Colleges and Universities in the Philippines (AACCUP). The institution is organized into six specific academic institutes, each responsible for administering degree programs aligned with the statutory mandate of the college.

=== College of Information and Digital Sciences (CIDS) ===
This department focuses on computing, digital infrastructure, and data management. It offers both degree and associate programs intended to support the technology sector in the Davao region.. It includes undergraduate studies on Information Technology, Information System. It also have associate studies on Information Technology and Computer Technology.

=== College of Business Education and Governance (CBEG) ===
CBEG provides instruction in business management, public administration, and accounting. The programs emphasize the intersection of agricultural economics and public policy. It includes undergraduate studies on Agri-Business, Public Administration, Accounting Information System.

=== Institute of Teacher Education (ITED) ===
The teacher education institute trains educators for primary and secondary instruction, offering specialized majors aligned with national curriculum standards. It includes undergraduate studies on Technology and Livelihood Education, Elementary Education, Secondary Education with Majors on Mathematics, General Science, Social Studies, English language, and Filipino language.

=== College of Agriculture and Related Sciences (CARS) ===
Functioning as the historical core of the institution, CARS provides instruction in agricultural sciences, forestry, food technology, and development communication. It includes undergraduate studies on Development Communication, Agroforestry and Agriculture with Majors in Animal Science, Crop Protection, Horticulture. It also has certificate course in Agricultural Sciences.

=== College of Computing, Engineering, and Technology (CCET) ===
Institute of Computing, Engineering, and Technology (CCET) CCET integrates engineering principles with agricultural applications and industrial technology, preparing students for technical roles in infrastructure and biosystems. It includes undergraduate studies on Biosystem Engineering, and Industrial-Electrical Technology.

=== College of Mathematics, Arts, and Sciences (CMAS) ===
CMAS offers foundational science and mathematics programs, emphasizing environmental monitoring, biological research, and biodiversity. It includes undergraduate studies on Mathematics, Environmental Science, Biology with Majors in Biodiversity and Medical Biology.

=== Institute of Graduate and Professional Education (IGPE) ===
The graduate school administers advanced degree programs tailored for educational administration and advanced business management. It includes Master of Business Administration - Major in AgriBusiness Management, Master of Arts in Education with Majors in Educational Management, Mathematics Teaching, Science Teaching and Language Teaching.

== Research production and scholarly output ==
Davao del Sur State College maintains a research agenda oriented toward environmental science, agricultural innovation, public health, and educational management. The institutional research productivity is managed by various specialized centers, including the Research Center for Emerging Pollutants and the Wellness Technology, Health and Care (WellTechCare) Research Center.

=== Scopus ranking ===
The college generates output in internationally indexed journals. In a 2026 assessment released by Global Health Focus (GHF), Davao del Sur State College ranked second among all State Colleges in the Philippines for Scopus-indexed research outputs. The report indicated that the college produced eight Scopus-indexed publications in 2026 alone, contributing to a cumulative total of 37 Scopus-indexed outputs recorded between 2022 and 2026.

=== Environmental and marine pollution studies ===
Researchers from the institution conduct extensive studies on marine and terrestrial pollutants in Mindanao. A study published in the Marine Pollution Bulletin (Elsevier) assessed microplastics in the Davao Gulf. The researchers conducted sea surface water trawling and sediment sampling, detecting microplastics in all samples. The study measured average surface water concentrations of 0.097, 0.75, and 0.14 particles per cubic meter across different trawls. Sediment concentrations were recorded at 15.55, 40.00, and 110.27 particles per kilogram across testing sites. Spectroscopic analysis identified 31 polymer types in the water and 12 in the sediments24. Polypropylene (51.41 percent) and high-density polyethylene (21.15 percent) dominated the water samples, indicating pollution sources tied to single-use plastics and packaging.

A secondary study in the same journal conducted a comprehensive assessment of macro-plastic pollution inland, on riverbanks, and along the coastline of Southern Mindanao. The research team evaluated 309 transects across coastal, river, and inland sites within a 100-kilometer radius of Davao City, detecting 13,970 debris items, providing empirical data to calculate riverine plastic emissions. To parallel this marine research, a study published in the Asian Journal of Education and Social Studies surveyed single-use plastic consumption among college students in Davao del Sur, identifying a high frequency of consumption and highlighting the need for institutional policy interventions.

=== Biodiversity, ecology, and water quality ===
Faculty members have documented local biodiversity metrics, publishing findings in the Biodiversity Data Journal (Pensoft Publishers). One study presented the first formal records of the cosmopolitan terrestrial slug, Deroceras laeve (Gastropoda, Agriolimacidae), in the Philippines.

Another study, published in the Biodiversitas Journal of Biological Diversity, evaluated the mangrove community structure, aboveground biomass, and carbon sequestration capacity in the unprotected coastal areas of Santa Cruz, Davao del Sur. Examining 36 plots, the researchers identified five mangrove species, noting the numerical dominance of Avicennia marina (67.80 percent relative abundance). The study calculated the total estimated stand aboveground biomass at 519.33 megagrams per hectare, and the carbon stock at 249.27 megagrams of carbon per hectare28. The data highlighted that while the species Sonneratia alba had low abundance, it contributed the highest aboveground biomass and carbon stock due to the presence of mature legacy trees.

The college has also conducted hydrological assessments. Research published regarding water quality in rural coastal communities of Davao del Sur evaluated microbial and metal contamination across 25 sampling sites. The data revealed that 64 percent of the sites showed contamination with Coliform and Escherichia coli, with total coliform bacteria ranging from 9,000 to 60,000 CFU/100 mL. The chemical analysis established mean values for Total Dissolved Solids (142.79 mg/L), Electrical Conductivity (250.14 μS/cm), and pH (7.45).

=== Intellectual property and agricultural patents ===
The college systematically registers intellectual property derived from its agricultural and technological research. The Intellectual Property and Technology Business Management office has secured multiple utility models and copyright registrations. Registered patents focus on agricultural yield enhancement and food science processing methods: A method for producing Liquid Myco-Insecticide Beauveria bassiana using coconut water. A method for enhancing the germination of rice seeds using Liquid Trichoderma. Food technology methods, including the creation of chili garlic sauce enhanced with calamansi rind, kropek derived from rice flour and seaweed, and crackers made from the Anodontia edentula (imbao) bivalve. Industrial product formulations, such as a method for manufacturing an alternative floor wax.

The institution develops software solutions for public sector administration. Copyrighted systems include the Electronic Daily Time Record System, Automated Output Rating Sheet System, Electronic Budget System, and the Electronic Human Resource Management Information System (eHRMIS).

== Agricultural extension and Coffee innovation ==
As an institution rooted in agrarian sciences, the college transfers technology directly to the local farming sector. The most prominent extension initiative is the Regional Coffee Innovation Center and Museum (RCIC), inaugurated on February 20, 2025. The RCIC was established through a multi-agency funding model. It received an initial ₱5 million allocation under the 2022 General Appropriations Act and an additional ₱660,000 grant from the Department of Science and Technology Region XI (DOST-XI) under the Community Empowerment through Science and Technology (CEST) program. Originally starting as a basic coffee cupping laboratory funded by ACDI/VOCA, the facility was upgraded to feature an advanced sensory laboratory, a training room, and a commercial coffee shop. The center functions as a research hub focusing on coffee chemistry, analyzing flavor compounds and chemical compositions. It conducts agronomic research into sustainable farming and soil management, and analyzes post-harvest processing methods such as drying and fermentation. The facility utilizes specialized machinery, including roasters, grinders, and Agtron color sorting machines, allowing local farmers to scientifically evaluate the moisture, color, and taste profiles of their beans to meet international market standards. A proprietary software system, ConeXus CupScore, is used to manage operational data analytics for the center. The integrated museum component documents the chronological history of coffee cultivation in the Philippines, dating back to its introduction in 1740, and displays a comprehensive collection of endemic bean varieties including Arabica, Robusta, Liberica, and Excelsa.

== Internationalization and global partnerships ==
The college operates an International Affairs and Relations Office to align its programs with external academic standards. The institution facilitates Faculty Global Mobility programs, sponsoring academic staff to participate in international training and conferences. Documented deployments include capacity enhancement seminars at Zhejiang Normal University in China, sustainable mobility forums at the International Association of Traffic and Safety Sciences in Japan, and leadership development programs coordinated by SEAMEO SEARCA in Malaysia and Taiwan.

The college has formalized partnerships with foreign universities and research institutes. The network includes institutions in Indonesia (Universitas Islam Indonesia, Universitas Muhammadiyah Prof. DR. HAMKA), Thailand (Prince of Songkla University), Vietnam (FPT University, Phenikaa University), and Malaysia (Universiti Teknologi Petronas, INTI International University)40. Linkages extend to the American International University, Daegu Health College in South Korea, and the International Center for Water Hazard Risk Management in Japan.
