= Northern Bukidnon State College =

- Kolehiyong Pangestado sa Hilagang Bukidnon (Filipino)
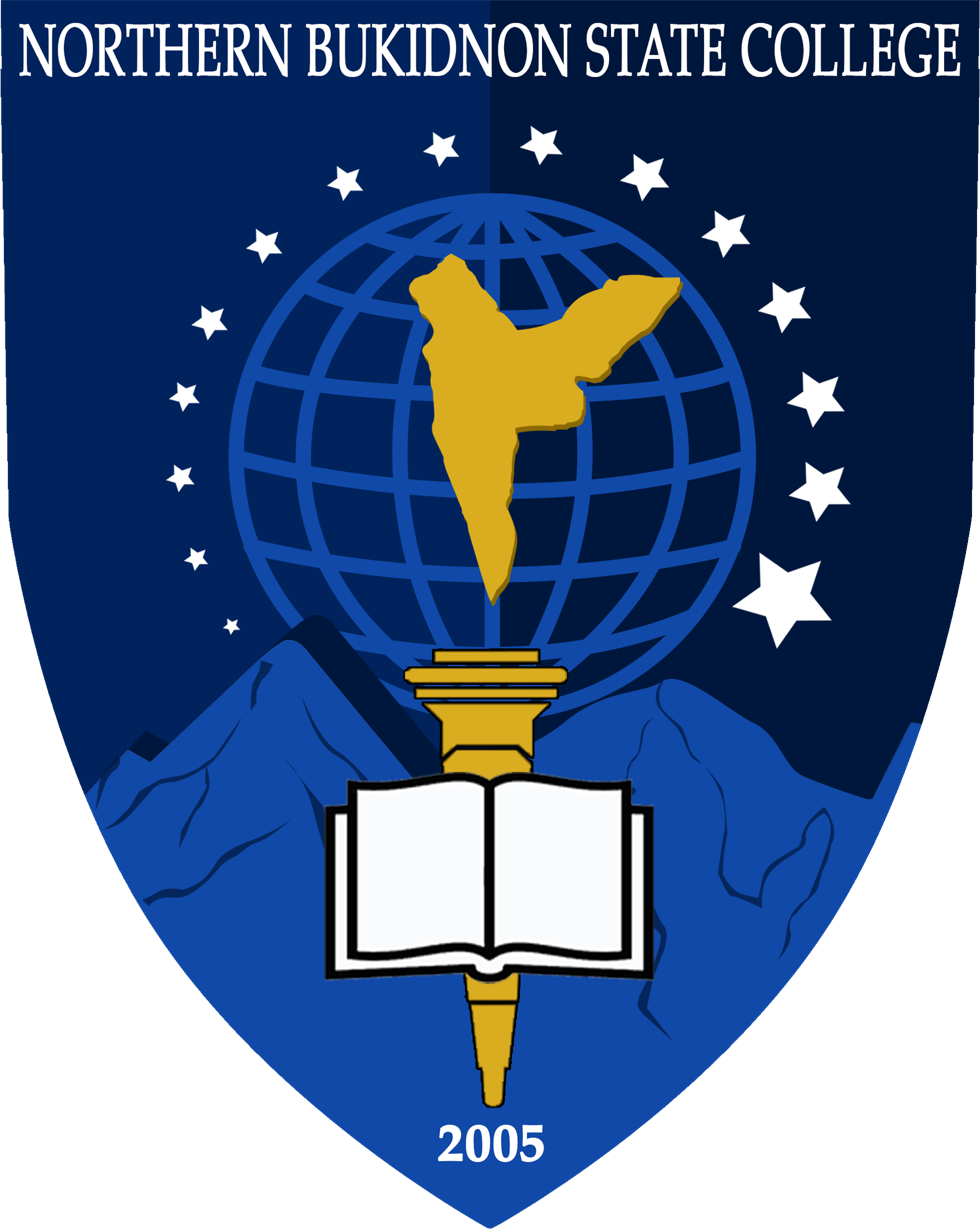
- Former name: Northern Bukidnon Community College (2005‑2019)
- Type: State college
- Established: 2005; 21 years ago
- Location: Manolo Fortich, Bukidnon, 8703, Philippines; 8°21′37″N 124°52′03″E
- Website: nbsc.edu.ph
- Location in Mindanao Location in the Philippines

Northern Bukidnon State College is a public higher education institution located in the municipality of Manolo Fortich, in the province of Bukidnon, Philippines. The college provides undergraduate degree programs in the fields of teacher education, business administration, and information technology. Operating under the statutory mandate of Republic Act No. 11284, the institution is directed to provide advanced studies, conduct scientific research, and execute community extension programs within its areas of specialization across the province of Bukidnon and the Northern Mindanao region.

== History ==
=== Northern Bukidnon Community College ===
The institution was conceived to address the demand for tertiary education within the municipality of Manolo Fortich. Before operating as an independent entity, the local government of Manolo Fortich facilitated higher education access by hosting extension programs from established universities. Between the academic years 2002 to 2003 and 2004 to 2005, the municipality hosted courses administered by Bukidnon State College, which later became Bukidnon State University, and the Mindanao State University–Iligan Institute of Technology.

The institution officially originated as the Northern Bukidnon Community College. The local government of Manolo Fortich formally established the community college in January 2005. The legal authorization for its initial operations was granted through Municipal Ordinance No. 368-2005, which was enacted on March 2, 2005. This ordinance authorized the Northern Bukidnon Community College to independently open classes for the academic year 2005 to 2006. During its first semester of operation, the community college recorded an enrollment of 143 students, with 45 students enrolled in the Teacher Education Program3. The initial academic offerings were limited to teacher education and commerce degrees.

The administrative leadership of the community college underwent several changes during its initial fifteen years. Lourdes Banaynal served as the College Registrar and Officer in Charge from 2005 to 2007, before becoming the first full-time Administrator from 2007 to 2010. She subsequently served another term as the Officer in Charge Administrator from 2011 to 2015. Sheila K. Maglente succeeded her as the Administrator from 2015 to 2020. Under her administration, the institution initiated the legislative and administrative steps required for conversion into a state college.

=== Conversion as a state college ===
The conversion of the institution was executed through a specific legislative process in the Congress of the Philippines. The legislative measure originated in the House of Representatives as House Bill No. 1160. The bill was introduced during the Seventeenth Congress July 5, 2016. The legislation successfully passed through both chambers on March 12, 2019. The name of the institution officially changed to Northern Bukidnon State College following the passage of Republic Act No. 11284 on April 12, 2019, which altered its status from a locally funded community college to a nationally funded state college.

The enactment of the law did not result in an immediate operational conversion. Sections 20 and 21 of Republic Act No. 11284 stipulated that the conversion would only take effect after the Commission on Higher Education (CHED) verified that the institution had complied with the requirements of CHED Memorandum Order No. 46, series of 2012. These compliance metrics required the institution to employ full-time permanent faculty with relevant graduate degrees, establish comprehensive learning resources, and execute community outreach programs. The college submitted its institutional recognition documents to the Commission on Higher Education in March 2020. The Commission on Higher Education En Banc officially approved the conversion on October 7, 2020.

Dr. Catherine Roween C. Almaden was appointed as the first College President, serving from 2020 to 2024 to oversee the structural transition. Following her term, Dr. Joy M. Mirasol served as the Officer in Charge College President from July to September 2024. Dr. Christie Jean Villanueva-Ganiera assumed the role of the second College President on October 21, 2024. In March 2025, the college observed its twentieth founding anniversary, calculating its institutional age from the enactment of the 2005 municipal ordinance.

== Governance structure ==
The governance of Northern Bukidnon State College is divided among the Board of Trustees, executive officers, and specialized administrative councils, ensuring representation from national agencies, regional bodies, and internal stakeholders.

=== Board of Trustees ===
The Board of Trustees acts as the highest governing body of the institution. Republic Act No. 11284 designates the Chairperson of the Commission on Higher Education, or an assigned Commissioner, as the Chair of the Board. The ex officio members of the Board include national legislators and regional directors. These members include the chair of the Senate Committee on Higher, Technical and Vocational Education, and chair of the House Committee on Higher and Technical Education. Regional representation is provided by regional director of the Department of Economy, Planning, and Development, regional director of the Department of Agriculture, and the regional director of the Department of Science and Technology.

Internal stakeholders hold designated seats on the Board. It includes the president of the faculty Association, the president of the alumni association, and the president of the central student government. The law also requires the inclusion of two prominent citizens from the private sector to serve two-year terms.

The Board is required to convene once every quarter. The body possesses the authority to promulgate institutional rules, approve curricula, determine faculty salaries, authorize external management audits, and absorb non-chartered tertiary institutions within the region as branches or extension centers.

=== Executive offices and administrative councils ===
The day-to-day operations of the college are led by the college president, who is appointed by the board of trustees upon the recommendation of a search committee. The president serves a four-year term and is eligible for reappointment. The president is supported by two primary vice presidents: the vice president for academic affairs and the vice president for administration and finance.

Policy formulation is guided by two councils. The administrative council consists of the president, vice presidents, deans, and directors, and is tasked with reviewing management and development policies. The academic council includes the president and all instructional staff with the rank of assistant professor or higher. This council determines admission and graduation standards, establishes student discipline rules, and reviews all curricular proposals before submission to the Board of Trustees.

=== Office of the College President ===
The Office of the College President directly supervises specialized units dedicated to legal compliance, strategic planning, and public relations. The Legal Office provides legal guidance to the administration and reviews institutional contracts to ensure compliance with national regulations. The office is responsible for representing the college in administrative and judicial proceedings and formulating risk management programs. The Internal Audit Office, conducts quarterly evaluations of the financial and operational controls of the college. This office executes compliance, management, and operations audits to verify that resources are utilized efficiently and ethically in accordance with government laws. The Quality Assurance Office, systematically reviews educational processes to maintain institutional standards. This unit facilitates program accreditation, curriculum assessments, and manages the Client Satisfaction Survey to gather stakeholder feedback. The Information and Communications Technology Management Office, is mandated to govern the digital infrastructure of the campus. This office executes the Information Systems Strategic Plan mandated by the Department of Information and Communications Technology and manages hardware maintenance, enterprise software administration, and the implementation of the Smart Campus initiative. Infrastructure development is supervised by the Project Management and Monitoring Office. This office translates development plans into construction packages, manages design documentation, conducts site inspections, and processes contractor billing. The Campus Safety Management Office enforces security protocols, controls access to the campus, and coordinates emergency responses through the Disaster Action and Response Team. External communications are managed by the Public Affairs and Information Office. This unit handles the production of official announcements, digital content, press releases, and the live streaming of institutional events. Research compliance is supervised by the Research Ethics Office. This office operates under the Research Ethics Committee, reviewing protocols involving human participants, ensuring informed consent procedures, and issuing data gathering permits. The International Affairs and External Linkages Office manages academic collaborations, student exchange programs, and joint research initiatives with foreign and domestic organizations.

=== Office of the Vice President for Administration and Finance ===
The Office of the Vice President for Administration and Finance functions as the operational core of the institution. The office ensures the efficient management of human resources, financial assets, and physical infrastructure. The Administrative Division oversees procurement, records, and personnel management. The Procurement Management Office facilitates competitive bidding and alternative procurement methods, coordinating with the Bids and Awards Committee and the Commission on Audit. The Supply and Property Management Office manages the lifecycle of physical assets, including receiving deliveries, conducting physical inventory counts, and processing the disposal of unserviceable equipment. The Records and Archival Office ensures document management compliance with the standards of the National Archives of the Philippines. The Human Resource Management and Development Office manages employee welfare and recruitment. The Gender and Development Office implements programs aligned with Republic Act No. 9710, the Magna Carta of Women, integrating gender sensitivity into institutional policies. The Finance Division is responsible for fiscal reporting and fund management. The Accounting Office implements auditing rules, processes payroll, and generates financial statements in accordance with the Government Accounting Manual. The Budget Office drafts annual budgets, monitors fund utilization, and coordinates allocations with the Department of Budget and Management. The Cashiering Office, processes official payments, tuition collections, and operational disbursements. The General Services Office maintains campus facilities. This office handles building maintenance, motorpool operations, and logistical event support. It includes the Ecological Solid Waste Unit, which ensures compliance with national waste management laws, and the Disaster Risk Reduction and Management Unit. The Auxiliary Services Division houses the Income Generation Program Office. Operating under the provisions of Republic Act 8292, this office develops commercial initiatives and strategic partnerships to generate alternative revenue streams, aiming for long-term financial stability and optimum utilization of institutional land and capital.

== Colleges and Course Offerings ==
The academic structure of Northern Bukidnon State College is overseen by the Office of the Vice President for Academic Affairs. The institution organizes its degree programs into specialized institutes, supported by a general education department.

=== Institute for Teacher Education ===
The Institute for Teacher Education is the original academic department of the college. The institute aims to produce licensed educators equipped with pedagogical skills for local and global employment. The institute offers three undergraduate degrees. These are Bachelor of Elementary Education, Bachelor of Early Childhood Education and Bachelor of Secondary Education, offering specialized major concentrations in Mathematics and English. The institute implements a professional development framework known as the MAGTUTUDLO pathway, designed to integrate academic content with practical life skills. To support students in obtaining professional licenses, the institute provides a structured intervention program called KALAMPUSAN. This program offers free review sessions and mock board examinations for fourth-year education students preparing for the Board Licensure Examination for Professional Teachers. The intervention is divided into four stages. The UMOL stage focuses on the formation of fundamental concepts in general and professional education courses. The BAID stage concentrates on the mastery of complex subject matter. The MANANAOG stage exposes students to advanced questions and test-taking strategies based on the performance of top examination placers. The PAGDUMDOM stage serves as a final synthesis, conducting a comprehensive review of all coursework prior to graduation and the national examination. Faculty members handling professional courses are required to submit validated examination questions each semester to support this program.

=== Institute for Computer Studies ===
The Institute for Computer Studies was established following authorization from the Commission on Higher Education on April 6, 2011, through Permit No. 018 Series 2011. The institute offers the Bachelor of Science in Information Technology, a four-year degree program that combines theoretical computing foundations with practical applications. The curriculum covers programming and software development, web and mobile applications, computer networks, system administration, database management, cybersecurity fundamentals, and IT project management. The program aims to modernize local industries by producing graduates capable of addressing digital divides in rural areas, preparing them for roles as software developers, network administrators, and systems analysts.

=== Institute for Business Management ===
The Institute for Business Management originated in 2005 as a commerce department offering a Bachelor of Science in Commerce. Following the issuance of CHED Order No. 39 in 2007, the program was restructured into the Bachelor of Science in Business Administration. The institute offers three specialized majors: Financial Management, Operations Management, Marketing Management. The curriculum is aligned with CHED Memorandum Order No. 17, series of 2017, which requires graduates to demonstrate proficiency in strategic planning, conflict resolution, and information technology application.

=== Department of General Education Curricula ===
The Department of General Education Curricula acts as a service unit providing foundational coursework to all degree programs. The department executes the curriculum mandated by CHED Memorandum Order No. 20, series of 2013, focusing on intellectual competence, civic responsibility, and practical communication skills. The faculty is divided into distinct subject areas: English and Humanities, Behavioral and Social Studies, and Science and Mathematics. The department also oversees the Physical Activities Towards Health and Fitness courses, focusing on active living and disaster preparedness. Furthermore, the department administers the National Service Training Program in accordance with Republic Act No. 9163. There are two active components of the program: Civic Welfare Training Service, and the Reserve Officers Training Corps, which provides fundamental military training based on the National Defense Act and Republic Act No. 7077.

== Student Affairs and Support Services ==
Non-academic student support is managed by the Student Affairs, Services and Development Division. The division implements the policies of the Commission on Higher Education regarding student welfare, offering career placement services and coordinating student organizations.

The Guidance and Counseling Office provides psychological and academic support using frameworks such as heutagogy and design thinking. The office implements strict intervention protocols for special cases. In instances of suicidal ideation or attempts, counselors ensure the student is continuously accompanied, provide immediate counseling, contact parents or guardians, complete custody documentation, and refer the individual to mental health professionals. During local calamities, the office collaborates with local government agencies to assess available aid and delivers psychological first aid to affected students.

Additional student services include the Appraisal, Testing and Admission Office which administers the College Admission Test and manages scholarship applications. The Learning Resource Center provides access to physical library materials and digital databases, including Gale Cengage, ProQuest, the Philippine E-Journals, and ScienceDirect. The Health Services Office offers medical consultations, basic dental care, wound dressing, and tele-consultation services.

== Research, publications, and achievements ==
Research initiatives at Northern Bukidnon State College are directed by the Research Development and Innovation Division. The research agenda aligns with the Philippine Development Plan 2023 to 2028, Ambisyon Natin 2040, and the United Nations Sustainable Development Goals, focusing on science, human well-being, and gender and development.

=== Policy influence and Local government utilization ===
The state college emphasizes applied research designed to influence local governance and policy formulation. Several research outputs have been formally utilized by government and military institutions.

A major demographic study titled Ang Nanay Kong Nene: Factors Influencing the Incidence of Teenage Pregnancy in Northern Mindanao was conducted and the findings were utilized as the empirical basis for an ordinance in Cagayan de Oro that prevents early pregnancy and institutionalizes social protection responsibilities for early parents. The research was also presented to the provincial board of the Province of Bukidnon to support the deliberation of a provincial ordinance addressing adolescent pregnancy.

Another utilized study, the Peace Research Initiative: Assessing Public Satisfaction with the Services of the 52nd Engineer Brigade of the Philippine Army in Eastern Mindanao for Shared Solutions and Citizen Engagement, was conducted the research was utilized by the military to inform the Community Services Program of the 52nd Engineering Brigade and served as a basis for the Army Transformational Roadmap adopted by local government units in Eastern Mindanao. In recognition of this work, the researchers received a Stakeholder Award from the 52nd Engineer Brigade based on the 2024 Client Satisfaction Survey.

=== Academic publications and Journal contributions ===
Faculty members actively publish in peer-reviewed journals across various disciplines. In the field of mathematics education, it published Exploring Learners' Productive Disposition Towards Learning Mathematics: A Phenomenological Analysis in the Science International Lahore journal. Another study titled Enhancing Mathematical Proficiency Assessment: Insights from Mathematics Teachers, received citations in the Aksioma Jurnal within an article discussing the development of enrichment books for rational numbers.

In the field of information technology it published School-IntegrIS: An Integrated System Approach to a School Management System of a State College in Northern Mindanao, Philippines in the International Journal of Computing Sciences Research. The study evaluated the functionality and efficiency of a unified digital school management platform using the ISO/IEC 25010 quality evaluation system.

The state college also has extensive publication record on educational assessment and reform. Publications include Teachers' professional identity, motivation and well-being in the context of the K TO 12 reform in the International Journal of Humanities and Social Sciences, Factors determining Mathematics performance of high school students in the American Journal of Educational Research, and Assessment Literacy of Pre-Service Teachers and the NCBTS Domain in the IAMURE International Journal of Education.

=== Conference presentations and International fellowships ===
The institution encourages the presentation of research at domestic and international scientific conferences. The college hosted the International Assessment Summit on May 13 to 14, 2024, which featured numerous papers from its faculty. Presentations included CHECK: Comprehensive Holistic Evaluation of Competencies and Knowledge, Development and Validation of Teaching Presence Instrument, At the Crossroads of Isolation and Pandemic: Challenges Faced by Students in Geographically Isolated and Disadvantaged Areas, and The Resentment Rating Scale for Couples. by Franco Ceasar M. Agbalog.

At the national level,it presented Structural Analysis of the Creative Industry of IPs in Northern Mindanao at the Philippine Population Association Conference in Tuguegarao, Cagayan. At the 5th Colleges and Universities Public Service Conference held at the Palawan State University, technology researchers presented several innovations. It presented eManifesto: A QR Code-Based Passenger Manifest Solution for Port Management Operations,IoT-Based Energy Monitoring System with Web and Mobile Applications, AquaExchange: IoT-Enabled Plastic Bottle Recycling Vending Machine with Machine Learning Image Processing, Internet of Things-based Fire Management System with Feedback Control Module, Multi-level Norms Influencing Incidence of Adolescent Pregnancy: Pre- and Post-Pandemic in Northern Mindanao, Philippines.

Internationally, it received Best Presentation Awards at the 7th Asia Future Conference hosted by Chulalongkorn University in Bangkok, Thailand. In June 2026, faculty researcher commenced the Naveen Jindal Young Global Research Fellowship at the O.P. Jindal Global University in Haryana, India. The fellowship involves a residency program focusing on artificial intelligence governance policies, legal technology applications, and requires the publication of a research manuscript in a Scopus-indexed academic journal.

To support these academic endeavors, the Research Development and Innovation Division established a dedicated research laboratory equipped with thirty laptops, fifty data-gathering tablets, and licensed analytical software, including SPSS and NVIVO12. The division also secured external funding, including a 3 million peso grant from the Department of Agriculture Bureau of Agricultural Research for a feasibility study on a metropolitan food and agri-based products cluster approach for Northern Mindanao. Several faculty members maintain associate memberships in the National Research Council of the Philippines.

== Infrastructure and development planning ==
The physical expansion of the campus is regulated by the Land Use Development and Infrastructure Plan, spanning the period from 2023 to 2033. The formulation of this master plan is required for all state universities and colleges under Republic Act No. 11396. The document outlines the allocation of institutional land for the construction of academic buildings and auxiliary services, ensuring that development aligns with the zoning regulations of the local government of Manolo Fortich. The plan was developed by a technical working group at the college, led by former President Catherine Roween C. Almaden, with capacity training provided by Central Mindanao University11. The document received endorsements from the Department of Human Settlement and Urban Development before its approval by the Board of Trustees in December 2022.

A major infrastructural achievement under this development plan was the construction of a student welfare and development center. The three-story facility was built with an allocated budget of 99 million Philippine pesos and occupies over 1,300 square meters in Sitio Kihare, Barangay Tangkulan. The building was inaugurated on February 2, 2024, in a ceremony led by then Senate President Juan Miguel Zubiri. The center serves as a hub for student services and includes a fine arts laboratory focusing on product design, simulation laboratories for education students, and a cultural and creative innovation hub designed to preserve the traditions of indigenous communities. Local government support extends beyond infrastructure, with the municipal council allocating funding for hundreds of academic scholarships and providing semester allowances for senior high school students in the area.
