= Apayao State College =

Public college in Apayao, Philippines

- Former names: Conner Vocational High School; Kalinga-Apayao School of Arts and Trades; Apayao Institute of Science and Technology
- Type: State college
- President: Dr. John N. Cabansag
- Vice-president: Dr. Ronald O. Ocampo (Academics, Research, Development & Extension Services); Jemmarie S. Kotoken (Administration & Finance Services)
- Location: Conner, Apayao, Philippines; 17°49′03″N 121°16′55″E
- Website: asc.edu.ph
- Location in Luzon Location in the Philippines

Apayao State College (ASC) is a public college in the Philippines. Its main campus is located in Conner, Apayao, with a satellite campus in Luna, Apayao

== Academics ==
=== Graduate Programs ===
- PhD in Education, Major in Educational Leadership and Management
- Master of Arts in Education (Major in: Educational Management, English & Mathematics)
- Master of Public Administration, Major in Program Development and Administration
- Master of Science (Major in Animal Science & Crop Science)

=== Undergraduate Programs ===
- Bachelor of Secondary Education (Major in: English, Filipino, Math, Social Science & Technology and Livelihood Education)
- Bachelor of Elementary Education
- Bachelor of Information Technology
- Bachelor of Science in Industrial Technology (Major in Automotive Technology, Electronics Technology Garments Technology, Food Technology, Civil Technology & Drafting Technology)
- Bachelor of Technical Teacher Education (Major in: Automotive Management, Foods Service Management & Electronics
- Bachelor of Science in Civil Engineering
- Bachelor of Science in Hotel & Restaurant Management
- Bachelor of Science in Agriculture (Major in: Crop Science & Animal Science)
- Bachelor of Science in Business Administration (Major in: Office Management, Entrepreneurial Management, Marketing)
- Bachelor of Science in Tourism
- Bachelor of Science in Criminology
- Bachelor of Science in Forestry
- Bachelor of Physical Education
- Bachelor of Science in Agricultural Biosystems Engineering
