= List of Tau Gamma Phi chapters =

Tau Gamma Phi, also known as Triskelions’ Grand Fraternity, is a collegiate fraternity in the Philippines. The fraternity was founded on October 4, 1968, by students from the University of the Philippines Diliman. The fraternity has four categories of chapters, based on its four membership types:

- School-based – for men attending colleges, universities, and institutions)
- Community-based – for men who are employed, self-employed, or attending a college without a chapter)
- Junior – for men attending high school
- Alumni – for former school-based members who have graduated and have employment; can be chapter-based or part of the Alumni Association

Following are the chapters of Tau Gamma Phi, with inactive institutions in italics.

== School chapters ==
Institution	Charter date	Location	District	Status	Ref.
University of the Philippines Diliman	October 4, 1968	Diliman, Quezon City	Metro Manila		
PMI Colleges	August 3, 1969	Quiapo, Manila	Metro Manila		(Note: Chapter formed at the Philippine Maritime Institute, now PMI Colleges.)
FEATI University	March 5, 1970	Santa Cruz, Manila	Metro Manila		
Mapúa University, Main Campus	April 1970	Intramuros, Manila	Metro Manila		(Note: Chapter formed at the Mapua Institute of Technology, now Mapúa University.)
National University	October 23, 1970	Sampaloc, Manila	Metro Manila		
University of Santo Tomas	March 1, 1970	Sampaloc, Manila	Metro Manila		
Adamson University	July 8, 1973	Manila	Metro Manila		
National College of Business Administration and Economics	1973	Manila	Metro Manila		
University of the East	January 21, 1974	Manila	Metro Manila		
Philippine School of Business Administration	1974	Sampaloc, Manila	Metro Manila		
Manuel L. Quezon University	October 8, 1974	Quiapo, Manila	Metro Manila		
San Sebastian College – Recoletos	November 19, 1974	Manila	Metro Manila		
Far Eastern University	July 27, 1975	Sampaloc, Manila	Metro Manila		
Technological University of the Philippines	February 22, 1976	Ermita, Manila	Metro Manila		(Note: Chapter formed at the Philippine College of Arts and Trade, now the Technological University of the Philippines.)
University of Manila	March 7, 1976	Sampaloc, Manila	Metro Manila		
Philippine College of Criminology	August 7, 1976	Quiapo, Manila	Metro Manila		
Lyceum of the Philippines	August 15, 1976	Intramuros, Manila	Metro Manila		
Gregorio Araneta University Foundation	October 15, 1976	Malabon	Metro Manila		
De Ocampo Memorial College	August 30, 1977	Santa Mesa, Manila	Metro Manila		
Eulogio "Amang" Rodriguez Institute of Science and Technology	March 19, 1978	Santa Mesa, Manila	Metro Manila		
PATTS College of Aeronautics	September 5, 1978	Pasay	Metro Manila		(Note: Chapter formed at the Philippine Air Transport and Training Services, now PATTS College of Aeronautics)
PMI Colleges	March 2, 1979	Marikina	Metro Manila		(Note: Chapter formed at the Philippine Merchant Marine College, now PMI Colleges,)
De La Salle University	1982	Manila	Metro Manila	Active	
AMA University, Manila Campus	June 11, 2001	Santa Mesa, Manila	Metro Manila		(Note: Chapter was formed at AMA Computer College, now AMA University.)
ABE International Business College		Cainta, Rizal	Calabarzon		
ABE International Business College, Malolos Campus		Malolos, Bulacan	Central Luzon		
ACLC College Butuan City		Butuan, Agusan del Norte	Caraga		(Note: Chapter formed at A.M.A CLC, now ACLC College Butuan City.)
Adventist University of the Philippines		Silang, Cavite	Calabarzon		(Note: Chapter formed at Philippine Union College, now Adventist University of the Philippines.)
Ago Foundation College		Naga, Camarines Sur	Bicol		
Ago Medical Educational Center		Legazpi, Albay	Bicol		
Agro-Industrial Foundation College of the Philippines		Davao City, Davao del Sur	Davao		
Airlink International Aviation School		Pasay	Metro Manila		
Aklan State University		Banga, Aklan	Western Visayas		
Aldersgate College		Solano, Nueva Vizcaya	Cagayan Valley		
AMA University, Main Campus		Quezon City	Metro Manila		
AMA University, Amacle Camups		Apalit, Pampanga	Central Luzon		
AMA University, Binan Campus		Binan, Laguna	Calabarzon		
AMA University, Cebu City		Cebu City, Cebu	Central Visayas		
AMA University, Davao City Campus		Davao City, Davao del Sur	Davao		
AMA University, East Rizal Campus		Rizal	Calabarzon		
AMA University, Quezon City Campus		Quezon City	Metro Manila		
AMA University, Las Pinas Campus		Las Piñas	Metro Manila		
AMA University, Legazpi Campus		Legazpi, Albay	Bicol		
AMA University, Lucena Campus		Lucena, Quezon	Calabarzon		
AMA University, Makati City Campus		Makati	Metro Manila		
AMA University, Malolos Campus		Malolos, Bulacan	Central Luzon		
AMA University, Pasig Campus		Pasig	Metro Manila		
AMA University, Puerto Princessa Campus		Puerto Princesa, Palawan	Mimaropa		
AMA University, Zamboanga Campus		Zamboanga City	Zamboanga Peninsula		
Angeles University Foundation		Angeles City, Pampanga	Central Luzon		
Arellano University School of Law		Pasay	Metro Manila		
Araullo University		Cabanatuan, Nueva Ecija	Central Luzon		
Arellano University		Sampaloc, Manila	Metro Manila		
Asian Institute of Computer Studies		Quezon City	Metro Manila		
Asian Institute of Maritime Studies		Pasay	Metro Manila		
Asia Pacific College		Makati	Metro Manila		
Asian Institute of Computer Studies		Don Bosco, Parañaque	Metro Manila		
Ateneo de Davao University		Davao City, Davao del Sur	Davao		
Ateneo de Manila University		Quezon City	Metro Manila		
Ateneo de Naga University		Naga, Camarines Sur	Bicol		
Ateneo de Zamboanga University		Zamboanga City	Zamboanga Peninsula		
Aurora State College of Technology		Baler, Aurora	Central Luzon		
Baliuag University		Baliwag, Bulacan	Central Luzon		
Bataan Peninsula State University		Bataan	Central Luzon		
Batangas State University, Governor Pablo Borbon Main I		Batangas City, Batangas	Calabarzon		
Batangas State University, Governor Pablo Borbon Main II		Batangas City, Batangas	Calabarzon		
Batangas State University, Don Claro M. Recto Campus		Lipa, Batangas	Calabarzon		
Benguet State University		La Trinidad, Benguet	Cordillera		(Note: Chapter formed at Mountain State Agricultural College, now Benguet State University.)
Bicol College		Daraga, Albay	Bicol		
Bicol College of Arts and Trades		Naga, Camarines Sur	Bicol		
Bicol University		Legazpi, Albay	Bicol		
Bicol University College of Agriculture and Fisheries		Tabaco, Albay	Bicol		
Bicol University, Tabaco Campus		Tabaco, Albay	Bicol		
Biliran National College of Agriculture		Biliran, Biliran	Eastern Visayas		
Biliran Province State University		Naval, Biliran	Eastern Visayas		(Note: Chapter formed at the Naval Institute of Technology and Naval State University, Biliran Province State University.)
Bukidnon State University		Malaybalay, Bukidnon	Northern Mindanao		
Bukidnon State External College		Gingoog, Misamis Oriental	Northern Mindanao		
Bulacan Agricultural State College		San Ildefonso, Bulacan	Central Luzon		
Bulacan Polytechnic College		Malolos, Bulacan	Central Luzon		
Bulacan State University		Malolos, Bulacan	Central Luzon		
Butuan Doctors' College		Butuan, Agusan del Norte	Caraga		
Cagayan de Oro College - PHINMA Education Network		Cagayan de Oro, Misamis Oriental	Northern Mindanao		
Cagayan State University, Andrews Campus		Cauayan, Isabela	Cagayan Valley		(Note: Chapter formed at Cagayan State Polytechnic College, Fermin, now Cagayan State University.)
Cagayan State University, Carig Campus		Tuguegarao, Cagayan	Cagayan Valley		
Cagayan State University, Lallo Campus		Lal-lo, Cagayan	Cagayan Valley		
Cagayan State University, Sanchez Mira Campus		Sanchez Mira, Cagayan	Cagayan Valley		
Calayan Educational Foundation Inc.		Lucena, Quezon	Calabarzon		
Camarines Norte State College		Daet, Camarines Norte	Bicol		
Camarines Sur Institute of Fisheries and Marine Sciences, Pasacao Campus		Pasacao, Camarines Sur	Bicol		(Note: Chapter formed at the Pasacao School of Fisheries, now Camarines Sur Institute of Fisheries and Marine Sciences - Pasacao.)
Camiguin Polytechnic State College		Mambajao, Camiguin	Northern Mindanao		(Note: Chapter formed at Polytechnic State College, Camiguin, now Camiguin Polytechnic State College.)
Capitol University		Cagayan de Oro, Misamis Oriental	Northern Mindanao		
Catanduanes State University		Virac, Catanduanes	Bicol		
Cavite State University		Bacoor, Cavite	Calabarzon		
Cavite State University		Carmona, Cavite	Calabarzon		
Cavite State University		Cavite City, Cavite	Calabarzon		
Cavite State University		Imus, Cavite	Calabarzon		
Cavite State University		Indang, Cavite	Calabarzon		
Cavite State University		Naic, Cavite	Calabarzon		
Cavite State University		Rosario, Cavite	Calabarzon		
Cavite State University		Silang, Cavite	Calabarzon		
Cavite State University		Tanza, Cavite	Calabarzon		
Cavite State University		Trece Martires, Cavite	Calabarzon		
Cebu Doctors' University		Mandaue City, Cebu	Central Visayas		
Cebu Institute of Technology – University		Cebu City, Cebu	Central Visayas		
Cebu Technological University, Main Campus		Cebu City, Cebu	Central Visayas		
Cebu Technological University, Danao City Campus		Danao City, Cebu	Central Visayas		
Central Bicol State University of Agriculture		Pili, Camarines Sur	Bicol		
Central Colleges of the Philippines		Quezon City	Metro Manila		
Central Luzon College of Science and Technology, Pampanga Campus		San Fernando, Pampanga	Central Luzon		(Note: Chapter formed at Celtech College, now Central Luzon College of Science and Technology - San Fernando, Pampanga Campus.)
Central Luzon State University		Muñoz, Nueva Ecija	Central Luzon		
Central Mindanao Colleges		Kidapawan, Cotabato	Soccsksargen		
Central Mindanao University		Valencia, Bukidnon	Northern Mindanao		
Central Philippines University		Iloilo City, Iloilo	Western Visayas		
Central Sulu College		Siasi, Sulu	Zamboanga Peninsula		
Centro Escolar Las Piñas		Las Pinas	Metro Manila		(Note: Chapter formed at Las Pinas College, now Centro Escolar Las Piñas.)
Centro Escolar University		Manila	Metro Manila		
Centro Escolar University, Malolos Campus		San Miguel, Manila	Metro Manila		
Christ the King College Borongan City		Borongan, Eastern Samar	Eastern Visayas		
Colegio De Los Baños		Los Baños, Laguna	Calabarzon		
Colegio de la Purisima Concepcion		Roxas City, Capiz	Western Visayas		
Colegio de Montalban		Rodriguez, Rizal	Calabarzon		
Colegio de San Juan de Letran		Calamba, Laguna	Calabarzon		
Colegio de San Juan de Letran		Intramuros, Manila	Metro Manila		
Colegio de Santa Rita de San Carlos		San Carlos, Pangasinan	Ilocos		
Colegio San Agustin - Bacolod		Bacolod City, Negros Occidental	Negros Island		
College of the Holy Spirit Manila		Manila	Metro Manila		
Cor Jesu College		Digos City, Davao del Sur	Davao		(Note: Chapter formed at Holy Cross College of Digos, now Cor Jesu College.)
Core Gateway College		San Jose, Nueva Ecija	Central Luzon		(Note: Chapter formed at the Colleges of the Republic, now Core Gateway College.)
Cotabato Foundation College of Science and Technology		Arakan, Cotabato	Soccsksargen		
Cotabato State University		Cotabato City	Soccsksargen		(Note: Chapter formed at Cotabato City State Polytechnic College, now Cotabato State University.)
Davao Doctors' College		Davao City, Davao del Sur	Davao		
Davao Medical School Foundation		Davao City, Davao del Sur	Davao		
De La Salle Lipa		Lipa City, Batangas	Calabarzon		
De La Salle University		Malate, Manila	Metro Manila		
De La Salle University – Dasmariñas		Dasmariñas, Cavite	Calabarzon		
Divine Word College of Calapan		Calapan, Oriental Mindoro	Mimaropa		
Divine Word College of Laoag		Laoag, Ilocos Norte	Ilocos		
Divine Word College of Legazpi		Legazpi, Albay	Bicol		
Divine Word College of San Jose		San Jose, Occidental Mindoro	Calabarzon		
Divine Word University of Tacloban		Tacloban, Leyte	Eastern Visayas		
DMMA College of Southern Philippines		Davao City, Davao del Sur	Davao		(Note: Chapter formed at the Davao Merchant Marine Academy College of Southern Philippines, now DMMA College of Southern Philippines.)
Dr. Carlos S. Lanting College		Quezon City	Metro Manila		
Dr. Filemon C. Aguilar Memorial College of Las Piñas		Las Piñas	Metro Manila		
Dr. Nicanor Reyes Memorial Colleges		Paniqui, Tarlac			
Don Bosco Technical College		Mandaluyong	Metro Manila		
Don Honorio Ventura State University		Bacolor, Pampanga	Central Luzon		
Don Honorio Ventura State University, Apalit Campus		Apalit, Pampanga	Central Luzon		
Don Mariano Marcos Memorial State University		San Fernando, La Union	Ilocos		
Eastern Samar State University		Borongan, Eastern Samar	Eastern Visayas		
Eastern Visayas State University		Tacloban, Leyte	Eastern Visayas		
Electron College of Technical Education		Novaliches, Quezon City	Metro Manila		
Emilio Aguinaldo College		Malate, Manila	Metro Manila		
Eulogio "Amang" Rodriguez Institute of Science and Technology, Cavite Campus		General Mariano Alvarez, Cavite	Calabarzon		
Emilio Aguinaldo College		Dasmariñas, Cavite	Calabarzon		
Far Eastern University		Quezon City	Metro Manila		
Far Eastern University, Cavite Campus		Dasmariñas, Cavite	Calabarzon		
Father Saturnino Urios University		Butuan, Agusan del Norte	Caraga		
Filamer Christian University		Roxas City, Capiz	Western Visayas		
Fisher Valley College		Hagonoy, Taguig	Metro Manila		
Fullbright College		Puerto Princesa, Palawan	Mimaropa		
Garcia College of Technology		Kalibo, Aklan	Western Visayas		
Glan School of Arts and Trades		Glan, Sarangani	Soccsksargen		
Guagua National Colleges		Guagua, Pampanga	Central Luzon		
Guzman Institute of Technology		Quiapo, Manila	Metro Manila		
Holy Angel University		Angeles City, Pampanga	Central Luzon		
Holy Child Colleges of Butuan City		Butuan, Agusan del Norte	Caraga		
Holy Cross of Davao College		Davao City, Davao del Sur	Davao		
Holy Trinity University		Puerto Princesa, Palawan	Calabarzon		
ICCT Colleges Foundation		Cainta, Rizal	Calabarzon		(Note: Chapter formed at the Institute of Creative Computer Technology, now ICCT Colleges Foundation.)
Illana Bay Integrated Computer College		Parang, Maguindanao del Norte	Bangsamoro		
Iloilo Doctors' College		Iloilo City, Iloilo	Western Visayas		
Imus Computer College GMA Cavite		General Mariano Alvarez, Cavite	Calabarzon		
Indiana Aerospace University		Lapu-Lapu City, Cebu	Central Visayas		
Informataics International College		Alabang, Muntinlupa	Metro Manila		
Informataics International College		Cainta, Rizal	Metro Manila		
International Academy of Management and Economics		Makati	Metro Manila		
International Harvardian University		Digos City, Davao del Sur	Davao		
Infotech Institute of Arts and Sciences		Makati	Metro Manila		
Infotech Institute of Arts and Sciences		Pasig	Metro Manila		
Isabela State University		Echague, Isabela	Cagayan Valley		
Jamiatul Philippine Al-Islamia		Marawi City, Lanao del Sur	Bangsamoro		
John B. Lacson Colleges Foundation – Bacolod		Bacolod, Negros Occidental	Negros Island		
John B. Lacson Foundation Maritime University		Molo, Iloilo City, Iloilo	Western Visayas		
José Rizal University		Mandaluyong	Metro Manila		
La Consolacion College Manila		Manila	Metro Manila		
La Consolacion University Philippines		Malolos, Bulacan	Central Luzon		
La Salle College–Victorias		Victorias, Negros Occidental	Negros Island		
Laguna College		San Pablo, Laguna	Calabarzon		
Laguna College of Business and Arts		Calamba, Laguna	Calabarzon		
Laguna State Polytechnic University		Siniloan, Laguna	Calabarzon		
Lanao Agricultural College		Lumbatan, Lanao del Sur	Bangsamoro		
Leyte Colleges		Tacloban City, Leyte	Eastern Visayas		
Leyte Normal University		Tacloban City, Leyte	Eastern Visayas		
Liceo de Cagayan University		Cagayan de Oro, Misamis Oriental	Northern Mindanao		
Ligao Community College		Ligao, Albay	Bicol		
Liwag College of Agriculture		Cabanatuan, Nueva Ecija	Central Luzon		
Lyceum-Northwestern University		Dagupan City, Pangasinan	Ilocos		
Lyceum of Subic Bay		Zambales	Central Luzon		
Lyceum of the Philippines University – Batangas		Batangas City, Batangas	Calabarzon		
Mabini Colleges		Daet, Camarines Norte	Bicol		
Manila Central University		Caloocan	Metro Manila		
Manila Doctors College		Ermita, Manila	Metro Manila		
Manuel S. Enverga University Foundation, Catanauan Campus		Catanauan, Quezon	Calabarzon		
Manuel S. Enverga University Foundation		Lucena, Quezon	Calabarzon		
Mapúa University, Makati Campus		Makati	Metro Manila		(Note: Chapter formed at Mapua Institute of Technology, now Mapúa University.)
Mariano Marcos State University		Batac, Ilocos Norte	Ilocos		
Mariano Marcos State University, Laoag Campus		Laoag, Ilocos Norte	Ilocos		
Mariners Polytechnic College		Canaman, Camarines Sur	Bicol		
Martinez Memorial Colleges		Caloocan	Metro Manila		
Masbate Colleges		Masbate City, Masbate	Bicol		
MATS College of Technology		Digos City, Davao del Sur	Davao		(Note: Chapter formed at Mindanao Aeronautical Technical School, now MATS College of Technology.)
Medici di Makati College		Makati	Metro Manila		(Note: Chapter formed from Makati Medical Center College, now Medici di Makati College)
Metro Manila College		Novaliches, Quezon City	Metro Manila		
Mindanao Polytechnic College		General Santos, South Cotabato	Soccsksargen		
Mindanao State University–General Santos City		General Santos, South Cotabato	Soccsksargen		
Mindanao State University–Iligan Institute of Technology		Iligan, Lanao del Norte	Northern Mindanao		
Mindanao State University–Lanao del Norte Agricultural College		Lanao del Norte	Northern Mindanao		
Mindanao State University–Lanao National College of Arts and Trades		Marawi City, Lanao del Sur	Bangsamoro		
Mindanao State University–Maguindanao		Datu Odin Sinsuat, Maguindanao del Norte	Northern Mindanao		(Note: Chapter formed at Mindanao State University - Dinaig Agricultural and Technical College, now Mindanao State University–Maguindanao.)
Mindanao State University–Tawi-Tawi College of Technology and Oceanography		Bongao, Tawi-Tawi	Bangsamoro		
Mindoro State University, Victoria Campua		Victoria, Oriental Mindoro	Calabarzon		(Note: Chapter formed at the Mindoro College of Agriculture and Technology, now Mindoro State University.)
Misamis University		Ozamiz, Misamis Occidental	Northern Mindanao		
Mount Carmel College of Baler		Baler, Aurora	Central Luzon		
Mountain View College		Valencia, Bukidnon	Northern Mindanao		
Naga College Foundation		Naga, Camarines Sur	Bicol		
National College of Business and Arts, Quezon City Campus		Quezon City	Metro Manila		
National College of Business and Arts, Sampaloc Campus		Sampaloc, Manila	Metro Manila		
National College of Business and Arts, Taytay Campus		Taytay, Rizal	Metro Manila		
National College of Science and Technology		Dasmarinas, Cavite	Calabarzon		
Negros Oriental State University		Dumaguete, Negros Oriental	Negros Island		
Negros Oriental State University, Guihulngan Campus		Guihulngan, Negros Oriental	Negros Island		
New Era University		Quezon City	Metro Manila		
North Cotabato School of Arts and Trades		Kidapawan, Cotabato	Northern Mindanao		
Northeastern College		Tuguegarao, Cagayan	Cagayan Valley		
Northern Mindanao State Institute of Science & Technology		Butuan, Agusan del Norte	Caraga		
Northwest Samar State University		Calbayog, Samar	Eastern Visayas		(Note: Chapter formed at Tiburcio Tancinco Memorial Institute of Technology, now Northwest Samar State University.)
Northwestern University		Laoag, Ilocos Norte	Ilocos		
Northwestern Visayan Colleges		Kalibo, Aklan	Western Visayas		
Notre Dame of Dadiangas University		General Santos, South Cotabato	Soccsksargen		
Notre Dame of Jolo College		Jolo, Sulu	Zamboanga Peninsula		
Notre Dame of Kidapawan College		Kidapawan, Cotabato	Soccsksargen		
Notre Dame of Marbel University		Kidapawan, Cotabato	Soccsksargen		
Notre Dame of Midsayap College		Midsayap, Cotabato	Northern Mindanao		
Notre Dame – RVM College of Cotabato		Cotabato City	Soccsksargen		
Notre Dame University		Cotabato City	Soccsksargen		
Nueva Ecija University of Science and Technology		Cabanatuan, Nueva Ecija	Central Luzon		(Note: Chapter formed at Central Luzon Polytechnic College, now Nueva Ecija University of Science and Technology.)
Nueva Vizcaya State University		Bambang, Nueva Vizcaya	Cagayan Valley		(Note: Chapter formed at Nueva Vizcaya Polytechnic College, now Nueva Vizcaya State University.)
Olivarez College		Sucat, Muntinlupa	Metro Manila		
Ortanez University		Quezon City	Metro Manila		
Our Lady of Fatima University		Lagro, Quezon City	Metro Manila		
Our Lady of Fatima University		Valenzuela	Metro Manila	Active	(Note: Chapter formed at Fatima College of Medicine, now Our Lady of Fatima University.)
Our Lady of Fatima University – Pampanga		San Fernando, Pampanga	Central Luzon		
Our Lady Of Mercy College - Borongan		Borongan, Eastern Samar	Eastern Visayas		(Note: College closed in February 2025.)
Our Lady of Lourdes College Foundation		Daet, Camarines Norte	Bicol		
Ovilla Technical College		Masbate City, Masbate	Bicol		
Palompon Institute of Technology		Palompon, Leyte	Eastern Visayas		
Palawan Polytechnic College		Puerto Princesa, Palawan	Mimaropa		
Palawan State University		Puerto Princesa, Palawan	Mimaropa		
Palawan State University, Coron Campus		Coron, Palawan	Mimaropa		
Palawan State University, Narra Campus		Narra, Palawan	Mimaropa		
Palawan State University, Taytay Campus		Taytay, Palawan	Mimaropa		
Pamantasan ng Lungsod ng Maynila		Intramuros, Manila	Metro Manila		
Pamantasan ng Lungsod ng Pasig		Pasig	Metro Manila		
Pangarungan Islam College		Marawi City, Lanao del Sur	Bangsamoro		
Pangasinan State University, Bayambang Campus		Bayambang, Pangasinan	Ilocos		(Note: Chapter formed at Central Luzon Teachers College, now Pangasinan State University, Bayambang Campus.)
Parang Foundation College		Parang, Maguindanao del Norte	Bangsamoro		
Partido College		Goa, Camarines Sur	Bicol		
Philippine Christian University		Malate, Manila	Metro Manila		
Philippine Rehabilitation Institute Foundation		Quezon City	Metro Manila		
Philippine School of Business Administration		Quezon City	Metro Manila		
Philippine School of Interior Design		Makati	Metro Manila		
Philippine State College of Aeronautics		Lapu-Lapu City, Cebu	Central Visayas		
Pines City Colleges		Baguio City, Benguet	Cordillera		(Note: Chapter was formed at Pines City Educational Center, now the Pines City Colleges.)
Polytechnic State University of Bicol		Nabua, Camarines Sur	Bicol		(Note: Chapter formed at Camarines Sur Polytechnic College, now Polytechnic State University of Bicol.)
Polytechnic University of the Philippines		Lopez, Quezon	Calabarzon		
Polytechnic University of the Philippines		Quezon City	Metro Manila		
Polytechnic University of the Philippines		Santa Mesa, Manila	Metro Manila		
Philippine Harvadian College		Cotabato City	Soccsksargen		
Philippine Women's University		Manila	Metro Manila		
Philippine Women's University		Quezon City	Metro Manila		
PLT College		Bayombong, Nueva Vizcaya	Cagayan Valley		
PNTC Colleges		Dasmariñas, Cavite	Calabarzon		
Polytechnic College of Davao del Sur		Davao City, Davao del Sur	Davao		
President Ramon Magsaysay State University		Zambales	Central Luzon		
Quezon City University		Quezon City	Metro Manila		(Note: Chapter formed from Quezon City Polytechnic University, now Quezon City University.)
Quezon City University, Batasan Chapter		Batasan Hills, Quezon City	Metro Manila		
Ramon Magsaysay Memorial Colleges		General Santos, South Cotabato	Soccsksargen		
Rizal Technological Polytechnic Institute		Morong, Rizal	Metro Manila		
Rizal Technological University		Mandaluyong	Metro Manila		
Rizal Technological University, Pasig Campus		Pasig	Metro Manila		
Romblon State University		Odiongan, Romblon	Calabarzon		
Roxas College		Roxas, Oriental Mindoro	Calabarzon		
Sacred Heart College of Lucena City		Lucena, Quezon	Calabarzon		
St. Anne College of Lucena		Lucena, Quezon	Calabarzon		
St. Benedict College		Alabang, Muntinlupa	Metro Manila		
St. Benedict College of Cotabato		Cotabato City	Soccsksargen		
St. Benedict College of Maguindanao		Parang, Maguindanao del Norte	Bangsamoro		
St. Clare College of Caloocan		Caloocan	Metro Manila		
Saint Ferdinand College		Ilagan, Isabela	Cagayan Valley		
Saint Joseph College of Maasin		Maasin, Southern Leyte	Eastern Visayas		
St. Joseph College–Olongapo		Olongapo, Zambales	Central Luzon		
Saint Joseph Institute of Technology		Butuan, Agusan del Norte	Caraga		
Saint Jude College		Sampaloc, Manila	Metro Manila		
Saint Louis College La Union		San Fernando, La Union	Ilocos		
St. Louise de Marillac College of Sorsogon		Sorsogon City, Sorsogon	Bicol		(Note: Chapter formed at Colegio de la Milagrosa Sorsogon, now St. Louise de Marillac College of Sorsogon.)
Saint Louis University		Baguio, Benguet	Cordillera		
St. Mary's College of Tagum		Tagum, Davao del Norte	Davao		
St. Mary's University		Bayombong, Nueva Vizcaya	Cagayan Valley		
St. Peter's College		Iligan, Lanao del Norte	Northern Mindanao		
St. Peter's College of Ormoc		Ormoc, Leyte	Eastern Visayas		
St. Therese - MTC Colleges, Magdalo Site		La Paz, Iloilo City	Western Visayas		
St. Therese - MTC Colleges, Tigbauan Site		Tigbauan, Iloilo	Western Visayas		
Samar State University		Catbalogan, Samar	Eastern Visayas		(Note: Chapter formed at Samar State Polytechnic College, now Samar State University.)
Samson College of Science and Technology		Cubao, Quezon City	Metro Manila		
San Beda University		Manila	Metro Manila		
San Francisco Javier College		Narra, Palawan	Calabarzon		
San Jose Colleges		San Jose, Nueva Ecija	Central Luzon		
San Nicolas College		Surigao City, Surigao del Norte	Caraga		
San Pablo Colleges		San Pablo, Laguna	Calabarzon		
San Pedro College		Digos City, Davao del Sur	Davao		
San Pedro College of Business Administration		San Pedro, Laguna	Calabarzon		
San Sebastian College – Recoletos		Quiapo, Manila	Metro Manila		
Silliman University		Dumaguete, Negros Oriental	Negros Island		
Sorsogon State University, Bulan Campus		Bulan, Sorsogon	Bicol		
Southern Capital Colleges		Oroquieta, Misamis Occidental	Northern Mindanao		
Southern Luzon Colleges		San Pablo, Laguna	Calabarzon		
Southern Luzon State University		Lucena, Quezon	Calabarzon		
Southern Philippines Adventist College		Matanao, Davao del Sur	Davao		
Southwestern University		Cebu City, Cebu	Central Visayas		
STI College, Butuan Campus		Butuan, Agusan del Norte	Caraga		
STI College, Cebu City Campus		Cebu City, Cebu	Central Visayas		
STI College, Concepcion Campus		Marikina Heights	Metro Manila		
STI College, Cotabato City Campus		Cotabato City	Soccsksargen		(Note: Chapter formed at System Technology Institute, now STI College.)
STI College, Cubao Campus		Cubao, Quezon City	Metro Manila		
STI College, Global City Campus		Global City Taguig	Metro Manila		
STI College, Lucena City Campus		Lucena, Quezon	Calabarzon		
STI College, Makati City Campus		Makati	Metro Manila		
STI College, Malolos Campus		Malolos, Bulacan	Central Luzon		(Note: Chapter formed at Systems Technology Institute, now STI College.)
STI College, Paranaque Campus		Parañaque	Metro Manila		
STI College, Quezon City Campus		Quezon City	Metro Manila		
STI College, Santa Maria Campus		Santa Maria, Bulacan	Central Luzon		
STI College Santa Rosa Campus		Santa Rosa, Laguna	Calabarzon		
STI College, Shaw Campus		Pasig	Metro Manila		
STI College, Taft Campus		Manila	Metro Manila		
STI West Negros University		Bacolod City, Negros Occidental	Negros Island		
Sulu State University		Jolo, Sulu	Zamboanga Peninsula		
Surigao del Norte College of Agriculture and Technology		Mainit, Surigao del Norte	Caraga		
Surigao del Norte State University		Surigao City, Surigao del Norte	Caraga		(Note: Chapter formed at Surigao State College of Technology, now Surigao del Norte State University)
Tarlac Agricultural University		Tarlac City, Tarlac	Central Luzon		
Tarlac State University		Tarlac	Central Luzon		
Technological University of the Philippines – Cavite		Dasmariñas, Cavite	Calabarzon		
Technological University of the Philippines, Quezon City Campus		Quezon City	Metro Manila		
Technological University of the Philippines, Quiapo Campus		Quiapo, Manila	Metro Manila		
Technological University of the Philippines, Taguig Campus		Taguig	Metro Manila		
Tomas Claudio Memorial College		Morong, Rizal	Metro Manila		
Trece Martires City College		Trece Martires, Cavite	Calabarzon		
Trinity University of Asia		Quezon City	Metro Manila		
UERMMMC College of Medicine		Quezon City	Metro Manila		
Unciano Colleges and General Hospital, Antipolo Campus		Antipolo, Rizal	Calabarzon		(Note: Chapter formed from Unciano Paramedical Colleges, now Unciano Colleges and General Hospital, Antipolo Campus.)
Universidad de Dagupan		Dagupan City, Pangasinan	Ilocos		(Note: Chapter formed at Colegio de Dagupan, now Universidad de Dagupan.)
Universidad de Manila		Manila	Metro Manila		(Note: Chapter formed at the City College of Manila, now Universidad de Manila.)
Universidad de Sta. Isabel		Naga, Camarines Sur	Bicol		(Note: Chapter formed at Colegio de Santa Isabel, now Universidad de Sta. Isabel.)
Universidad de Zamboanga		Zamboanga del Sur	Zamboanga Peninsula		(Note: Chapter formed at Zamboanga A.E. Colleges, now Universidad de Zamboanga.)
University of Asia and the Pacific, Ortigas Center		Ortigas Center	Metro Manila		
University of Baguio		Baguio City, Benguet	Cordillera		
University of Batangas		Batangas City, Batangas	Calabarzon		
University of Bohol		Tagbilaran, Bohol	Central Visayas		
University of Cagayan Valley		Tuguegarao, Cagayan	Cagayan Valley		(Note: Chapter formed at Cagayan Colleges Tuguegarao, now University of Cagayan Valley.)
University of Caloocan City	January 11, 2005	Caloocan	Metro Manila		
University of Cebu		Cebu City, Cebu	Central Visayas		(Note: Chapter formed at the Cebu Central Colleges, now University of Cebu.)
University of Cebu, Lapu-Lapu and Mandaue Campus		Mandaue, Cebu	Central Visayas		
University of Cebu, Mambaling Campus		Cebu City, Cebu	Central Visayas		
University of Eastern Philippines		Catarman, Northern Samar	Eastern Visayas		
University of Iloilo		Iloilo City, Iloilo	Western Visayas		
University of La Salette		Santiago, Isabela	Cagayan Valley		(Note: Chapter formed at La Salette of Santiago College, now University of La Salette.)
University of Luzon		Dagupan City, Pangasinan	Ilocos		(Note: Chapter was formed at Luzon Colleges, now the University of Luzon.)
University of Mindanao		Davao City, Davao del Sur	Davao		
University of Mindanao, Bansalan Campus		Bansalan, Davao del Sur	Davao		
University of Mindanao, Cotabato City Campus		Cotabato City	Soccsksargen		
University of Mindanao, Digos Campus		Digos City, Davao del Sur	Davao		
University of Mindanao, Tagum City Campus		Tagum, Davao del Norte	Davao		
University of Negros Occidental – Recoletos		Bacolod City, Negros Occidental	Negros Island		
University of Northeastern Philippines		Iriga, Camarines Sur	Bicol		
University of Northern Philippines		Vigan, Ilocos Sur	Ilocos		
University of Nueva Caceres		Naga, Camarines Sur	Bicol		
University of Pangasinan		Dagupan City, Pangasinan	Ilocos		
University of Perpetual Help System DALTA		Binan, Laguna	Calabarzon		(Note: Chapter formed at Perpetual Help College, now University of Perpetual Help System DALTA (Main Campus.)
University of Perpetual Help System DALTA, Las Piñas Campus		Las Piñas	Metro Manila		
University of Perpetual Help System DALTA, Molino Campus		Bacoor, Cavite	Calabarzon		
University of Perpetual Help System JONELTA, Manila Campus		Manila	Metro Manila		
University of Rizal System		Rizal	Calabarzon		
University of Saint Anthony		Iriga, Camarines Sur	Bicol		
University of St. La Salle		Bacolod City, Negros Occidental	Negros Island		
University of San Agustin		Iloilo City, Iloilo	Western Visayas		
University of San Carlos		Cebu City, Cebu	Central Visayas		
University of San Jose–Recoletos		Cebu City, Cebu	Central Visayas		
University of Santo Tomas–Legazpi		Legazpi, Albay	Bicol		(Note: Chapter formed at Aquinas University, now University of Santo Tomas–Legazpi.)
University of Southern Mindanao		Kabacan, Cotabato	Northern Mindanao		
University of Southern Philippines Foundation		Cebu City, Cebu	Central Visayas		
University of Southeastern Philippines		Davao City, Davao del Sur	Davao		
University of Southeastern Philippines College of Agriculture and Related Sciences, Tagum-Mabini Campus		Tagum, Davao del Norte	Davao		(Note: Chapter formed at the USP College of Agriculture Forestry, now the University of Southeastern Philippines College of Agriculture and Related Sciences, Tagum-Mabini Campus.)
University of Southern Mindanao, Cotabato City Campus		Cotabato City	Soccsksargen		(Note: Chapter formed at Mindanao Institute of Technology, now University of Southern Mindanao, Cotabato City Campus.)
University of the Cordilleras		Baguio City, Benguet	Cordillera		(Note: Chapter was formed at Baguio Colleges Foundation, now the University of the Cordilleras.)
University of the East Caloocan		Caloocan	Metro Manila		
University of the Immaculate Conception		Davao City, Davao del Sur	Davao		
University of the Philippines Baguio		Baguio City, Benguet	Cordillera		
University of the Philippines Cebu		Cebu City, Cebu	Central Visayas		
University of the Philippines Diliman Extension Program in Pampanga		Angeles City, Pampanga	Central Luzon		
University of the Philippines Los Baños		Los Baños, Laguna	Calabarzon		
University of the Philippines Manila		Malate, Manila	Metro Manila		
University of the Philippines Tacloban		Tacloban City, Leyte	Eastern Visayas		
University of the Philippines Visayas		Iloilo City, Iloilo	Western Visayas		
University of the Visayas		Cebu City, Cebu	Central Visayas		
Upi Agricultural School-Provincial Technical Institute of Agriculture		Upi, Maguindanao del Norte	Bangsamoro		
USP College of Fisheries		Digos City, Davao del Sur	Davao		
UST Angelicum College		Quezon City	Metro Manila		(Note: Chapter formed at Angelicum College, now UST Angelicum College.)
Velez College		Cebu City, Cebu	Central Visayas		
Virgen Milagrosa University Foundation		San Carlos, Pangasinan	Ilocos		
Visayas State University		Baybay, Leyte	Eastern Visayas		
Wesleyan University Philippines		Cabanatuan, Nueva Ecija	Central Luzon		
Western Institute of Technology		Iloilo City, Iloilo	Western Visayas		
Western Leyte College		Ormoc, Leyte	Eastern Visayas		
Western Mindanao State University		Zamboanga City	Zamboanga Peninsula		
Western Philippines University		Aborlan, Palawan	Calabarzon		(Note: Chapter formed from State Polytechnic College of Palawan, now Western Philippines University.)
Western Philippines University, El Nido Campus		El Nido, Palawan	Calabarzon		
World Citi Colleges-Caloocan		Caloocan	Metro Manila		
World Citi Colleges-Quezon City		Cubao, Quezon City	Metro Manila		
Xavier University – Ateneo de Cagayan		Cagayan de Oro, Misamis Oriental	Northern Mindanao		
Zamboanga Peninsula Polytechnic State University		Zamboanga City	Zamboanga Peninsula		
Zamboanga State College of Marine Sciences and Technology		Zamboanga del Sur	Zamboanga Peninsula		
Asian Institute of Science and Technology (AISAT)		Dasmariñas	Cavite		

== Junior chapters ==
Institution	Charter date	Location	Region	Status	Ref.
San Beda College High School	April 4, 1974	Manila	Metro Manila		
Triskelion Youth Movement	September 11, 1974	Paco, Manila	Metro Manila		
Agama Islam Academy		Ganassi, Lanao del Sur	Bangsamoro		
FEU Roosevelt, Cainta Campus		Cainta, Rizal	Calabarzon		(Note: Chapter formed at Roosevelt College, now FEU Roosevelt Cainta.)
Geronimo High School		Rodriguez, Rizal	Calabarzon		
Jose Abad Santos Memorial School		Quezon City	Metro Manila		
MSU-Malabang Community High School		Malabang, Lanao del Sur	Bangsamoro		
St. Mary's College of Borongan		Borongan, Eastern Samar	Eastern Visayas		(Note: Chapter formed at St. Joseph's College Borongan, now St. Mary's College of Borongan.)

== Community chapters ==
Chapter	Charter date	Location	Region	Status	Ref.
Adamson University Council Cembo community chapter	1992	MAKATI	NCR	Active	
Antipolo Council	1998	Antipolo, Rizal	Calabarzon	Active	
Asscot Chapter				Active	
Bahrain Council				Active	
Banua Chapter		Legazpi, Albay	Bicol		
Barangay Holy Spirit Council	2007		Barangay	Active	
Baybay Chapter		Tiwi, Albay	Bicol		
Bayugan City Council		Bayugan, Agusan del Sur	Caraga		
Binambangan Triskelion Community Chapter		Indang, Cavite	Calabarzon		
Brooklyn Triskelions	2022	Brooklyn, New York, US		Active	
Calauag Chapter		Naga, Camarines Sur	Bicol		
California Lower Missions Council	1978	California, US		Active	
CCP Council	2007			Active	
Cebu Provincial Council		Cebu	Central Visayas	Active	
Lawaan Dos Community Chapter	2021	Talisay City, Cebu	Central Visayas	Active	
Mangayawan Coastal Chapter		Canaman, Camarines Sur	Bicol		
Tagum, Davao Chapter		Tagum, Davao del Norte	Davao	Active	
Damayan Community Chapter		Taytay, Rizal	Calabarzon		
East Coast USA	2022	East Coast, US		Active	
Eastwood /Apcas Chapter		Balanga, Bataan	Central Luzon		
Empire State Triskelions	2024	New York, US		Active	
First Seal	1968			Active	
Floodway A Chapter		Taytay, Rizal	Calabarzon		
Germany Council	1969	Germany		Active	
Guam Triskelions	February 14, 1991	Guam, US		Active	
Hong Kong Council		Hong Kong, China		Active	
Internet Technology Council				Active	
Italy Council		Italy		Active	
Juban Council Bukidnon		Bukidnon	Northern Mindanao	Active	
Judicial Council		Tiwi, Albay	Bicol	Active	
Kaunlaran Ext. Chapter Commonwealth Sector			Metro Manila		
KSA Council				Active	
KSA Western Region Council	1996			Active	
Kungtang Bato Council		Cotabato	Soccsksargen	Active	
Lapu Lapu City Council		Lapu-Lapu City, Cebu	Central Visayas	Active	
Libjo Chapter		Tiwi, Albay	Bicol		
Libya Council		Libya		Active	
Lunsod ng San Juan Chapter		San Juan	Metro Manila	Active	
Maguyam Chapter		Silang, Cavite	Calabarzon		
Maharlika Community Chapter		Taytay, Rizal	Calabarzon	Active	
Marikina Triskelion City Government Employees		Marikina	Metro Manila		
Mid Atlantic, USA		Mid-Atlantic, US		Active	
Naga Chapter		Tiwi, Albay	Bicol		
Nagas Chapter		Tiwi, Albay	Bicol		
Narra Palawan Municipal Council		Narra, Palawan	Mimaropa		
NEC (Executive Council)				Active	
New Brunswick Regional Council	2020	New Brunswick, Canada		Active	
New Zealand Council		New Zealand		Active	
Northern California Triskelions		Northern California, US		Active	
Pacific Northwest	1997	Pacific Northwest, US		Active	
Papua New Guinea Council		Papua New Guinea		Active	
Paranaque Council, Manila		Parañaque	Metro Manila	Active	
Patriotic Seal			Metro Manila	Active	
Premium Community Chapter		Quezon City	Metro Manila		
Puro Chapter		Legazpi, Albay	Bicol		
Quezon City Council		Quezon City	Metro Manila		
Salamat Community Chapter		Taytay, Rizal	Calabarzon		
Salian Triskelion Community Chapter		Abucay, Bataan	Bataan		
San Diego Regional Council		San Diego, California, US		Active	
San Roque Chapter		Angono, Rizal	Calabarzon		
Sharjah Chapter		United Arab Emirates		Active	
Sinag Chapter, Planza		San Fernando, Camarines Sur	Bicol		
Singapore Council		Singapore		Active	
Soro Soro Ilaya Duluhan Chapter		Batangas	Calabarzon	Active	
Sukailang-Anomar Triskelion Community-Based Chapter		Surigao City, Surigao del Norte	Caraga		
Surigao City Council		Surigao City, Surigao del Norte	Caraga		
Sydney, Australia Council		Sydney, New South Wales, Australia		Active	
Tanchuling chapter		Legazpi, Albay	Bicol		
TAO Kuwait		Kuwait		Active	
Tau Gamma Sigma - TIWI		Tiwi, Albay	Bicol		
Thailand Council		Thailand		Active	
TGFS International				Active	
Tigbi Chapter		Tiwi, Albay	Bicol	Active	
Triseal International				Active	
Triskelion Abra		Abra	Cordillera	Active	
Triskelion de Pampanga		Pampanga	Central Luzon	Active	
Triskelion de Visayas		Visayas		Active	
Triskelion de Zamboanga Sibugay Council	2001	Ipil, Zamboanga Sibugay	Zamboanga Peninsula	Active	
Trikselion Global Foundation	2024			Active	
Trikselion Mid Atlantic Region		United States		Active	
Triskelion Municipal Council of TIWI		Tiwi, Albay	Bicol	Active	(Note: Previously called the TIWI Chapter.)
Triskelion Order of Medicine	2002			Active	
Triskelion Order of the Nursing	2007			Active	
Triskelion Order of Nursing, Fatima				Active	
Triskelion State of Qatar		Qatar		Active	
Triskelions International Republic of Ireland	2010	Republic of Ireland		Active	
Triskelions of Ohio	1968	Ohio, US		Active	
Tubajon Municipal Chapter		Dinagat Islands	Caraga		
Upper Barangays Chapter, Cararayan-Panicuason		Naga, Camarines Sur	Bicol		
Greenfields Chapter	2021	Pasacao, Camarines Sur	Bicol		

== Alumni chapters ==
Chapter	Charter date	Location	Region	Status	Ref.
Triskelion Alumni Association	August 13, 1979			Active	
Council of Elders		Tiwi, Albay	Bicol		
Our Lady of Fatima University Sigma		Valenzuela	Metro Manila	Active	
TAO Alumni, Batangas		Batangas	Calabarzon	Active	
TGP University of San Carlos Council, Cebu		Cebu	Central Visayas	Active	
TIWI Triskelion Alumni Organization		Tiwi, Albay	Bicol		
TRIAD (Triskelion Alumni of Dr. Filemon C. Aguilar Memorial College of Las Piñas)		Las Piñas City	National Capital Region	Active	

TAO UDM FORMER TAO CCM |National Capital Region ERMITA MANILA |Active
