= Association of Local Colleges and Universities =

Educational organization in the Philippines

- Abbreviation: ALCU
- Legal status: Association
- Purpose: Educational
- Headquarters: University of Makati
- Location: Manila, Philippines
- Region served: National
- Members: 40 schools
- President: Prof. Tomas B. Lopez
- Website: http://www.plm.edu.ph/alcu.html

The Association of Local Colleges and Universities or simply ALCU is composed of forty (40) local colleges and universities of the Philippines.

The primary thrust of ALCU is to improve the quality of instruction, research, and extension of its member schools and to provide value public tertiary education.

The association has created in the later part of 2003 the Commission on Accreditation, Inc., which is working closely with the Accrediting Agency of Chartered Colleges and Universities in the Philippines, Inc. (AACCUP).

During the investiture of Atty. Adel A. Tamano at the Justo Albert Auditorium of the PLM, he mentioned his plan of drafting the best-practices manual for local colleges and make it a project of the ALCU.

== Accreditation and standards ==
Together with the Accrediting Agencies of Chartered Colleges and Universities of the Philippines (AACCUP), the ALCUCOA formed the National Network of Quality Assurance Agencies (NNQAA) in 2004 to ensure the public of quality higher education among public higher educational institutions. With the help of AACCUP, Dr. Nida Africa, and the PAASCU executive director, ALCU member schools immerse themselves in quality assurance activities involving the following areas of accreditation. These include:

- Employability
- Community service
- Curriculum and instruction
- Research
- Faculty
- Student services
- Administration
- Physical plant and facilities
- Library
- Laboratory

Many ALCU member schools are now aiming for accreditation to uplift the quality of their program offerings.

To uphold quality higher education, ALCU partnered with the Commission on Higher Education as part of the Technical Working Group that three ordinances namely CMO No. 32, series of 2006, and CMO Nos. 1 and 10, series 2005.

== Member-Schools ==
The following is a list of local colleges and universities or LCUs that are members of the association. These include:

Name of University/College	Region	University/College Head	Year Established
Pamantasan ng Lungsod ng San Pablo	Calabarzon	Dr. Edelio Panaligan	1994
Mabalacat City College	Central Luzon	Prof. Carmelita P. Sotto – College President	2007
Bacolod City College	Western Visayas	Dr. Johanna Bayoneta – College Administrator	1997
Bago City College	Western Visayas	Dr. Gorgonio T. Parroco - College Administrator / President	1980
City College of Angeles, Pampanga	Central Luzon	Dr. Jenneth E. Sarmiento - College President	2011
City College of San Fernando, Pampanga	Central Luzon	Dr. Lourdes M. Javier – College President	2009
Baliwag Polytechnic College	Central Luzon	Atty. Robert John I. Donesa – College Administrator	2008
Bulacan Polytechnic College	Central Luzon	Atty. Joseph M. Inocencio	1971
City College of Calapan	Mimaropa	Dr. Ronald F. Cantos – College Administrator	2008
City College of Tagaytay	Calabarzon	Mr. Eduardo T. Castillo – College Administrator	2003
City of Malabon University	National Capital Region	Atty. Ramon M. Maronilla	1994
Dr. Filemon C. Aguilar Memorial College of Las Piñas	National Capital Region	Mr. Ramoncito Jimenez - Officer-In-Charge	1998
Gordon College	Central Luzon	Dr. Imelda DP. Soriano – OIC	1999
Gov. Alfonso D. Tan College	Misamis Occidental	Atty. Philip T. Tan	1984
La Carlota City College	Western Visayas	Dr. Fatima Bullos	1966
Laguna University	Calabarzon	Dr. Colegio S. Gascon - OIC, Office of the University President	2006
Kolehiyo ng Lungsod ng Lipa	Calabarzon	Mario Carmelo A. Pesa	1994
Mandaue City College	Central Visayas	Dr. Teresa H. Into	2005
Polytechnic College of the City of Meycauayan	Central Luzon	Councilor Catherine Abacan	2003
Navotas Polytechnic College	National Capital Region	Ms. Francisca S. Roque	1994
Pamantasan ng Bayan ng San Mateo	Calabarzon	–	2004
Pamantasan ng Cabuyao	Calabarzon	Dr. Charlemagne G. Lavina	2003
Pamantasan ng Lungsod ng Maynila	National Capital Region	Atty. Domingo Reyes Jr.	1965
Pamantasan ng Lungsod ng Marikina	National Capital Region	Dr. Erico M. Habijan	2003
Pamantasan ng Montalban	Calabarzon	Dr. Domingo B. Nuñez	2004
Pamantasan ng Lungsod ng Muntinlupa	National Capital Region	Dr. Ellen Presnedi	1991
City University of Pasay	National Capital Region	Dr. Rosanie Estuche	1994
Pamantasan ng Lungsod ng Pasig	National Capital Region	Dr. Glicerio Maningas	1999
Taguig City University	National Capital Region	Mr. Raymund A. Arcega, CESE	2006
Pamantasan ng Lungsod ng Valenzuela	National Capital Region	Dr. Nedeña C. Torralba	2002
Pateros Technological College	National Capital Region	Dr. Analiza Arcega	1993
Parañaque City College of Science & Technology	National Capital Region	Dr. Isabel R. Reyes – College Administrator	2000
Passi City College	Western Visayas	Mayor Elyzer C. Chavez – College Administrator	2005
Quezon City University	National Capital Region	Dr. Theresita V. Atienza – University President	1994
Quirino Polytechnic College	Cagayan Valley	Mr. Edilberto S. Acio – College Administrator	1998
Tagoloan Community College	Northern Mindanao	Hon. Yevgeny Vincente Emano – chairman, Board of Trustees	2003
Universidad de Manila	National Capital Region	Maria Lourdes N. Tiquia	1995
University of Caloocan City	National Capital Region	Atty. Emmanuel Emilio Vergara – University President	1971
University of Makati	National Capital Region	Prof. Elyxzur C. Ramos	1972
University of Eastern Pangasinan	Ilocos Region	Dr. Evelyn Abalos-Tomboc	2005
Urdaneta City University	Ilocos Region	Dr. Elizabeth A. Montero	1966
Valenzuela City Polytechnic College	National Capital Region	Dr. Nedeña C. Torralba/ Dr. Nellie Asuncion	1982
