= Pamantasan ng Lungsod ng Muntinlupa =

Public university in Muntinlupa, Philippines

- City University of Muntinlupa
- Motto: "Where Values Matter"
- Type: Public university
- Established: May 29, 1991; 35 years ago
- Affiliations: Philippine Schools, Colleges and Universities Athletic Association (PSCUAA), Association of Local Colleges and Universities-Accreditation Commission (ALCU-AC), Local Colleges and Universities
- President: Dr. Elena "Ellen" Presnedi (OIC)
- Undergraduates: 17,000+
- Postgraduates: No Data Available
- Location: Muntinlupa, Philippines; 14°23′21″N 121°01′32″E
- Colors: Green and White
- Website: www.plmun.edu.ph
- Location in Metro Manila Location in Luzon Location in the Philippines

The Pamantasan ng Lungsod ng Muntinlupa (PLMun) is a local university in the Philippines. It is one of the two public tertiary education institutions located in Muntinlupa, the other being the Colegio de Muntinlupa.

== Academic offerings ==
=== Undergraduate programs ===
- College of Arts and Sciences (CAS)
  - Bachelor of Arts in Communication
  - Bachelor of Science in Psychology
  - Bachelor of Arts in Political Science
  - Bachelor of Arts in Public Administration
- College of Business Administration (CBA)
  - Bachelor of Science in Business Administration
  - Major in Human Resource Development Management
  - Major in Marketing Management
  - Major in Operations Management
  - Bachelor of Science in Accountancy
- College of Criminal Justice (CCJ)
  - Bachelor of Science in Criminology
- College of Information, Technology and Computer Studies (CITCS)
  - Bachelor of Science in Computer Science
  - Bachelor of Science in Information Technology
  - Associate in Computer Technology
- College of Teacher Education (CTE)
  - Bachelor of Elementary Education (BEEd)
  - General Elementary Education
  - Early Childhood Education (ECED)
  - Special Education (SPED)
  - Bachelor of Secondary Education (BSEd)
  - Major in Biological Science
  - Major in English
  - Major in Filipino
  - Major in Mathematics
  - Major in Social Science
  - Major in Music, Arts Physical Education and Health (MAPEH)
- Institute of Social Work (ISW)
  - Bachelor of Arts in Social Work

=== Graduate Studies ===
- Master in Business Administration
- Master of Arts in Education, major in Educational Management
- Master of Arts in Education, major in Guidance and Counseling
- Master in Security and Correctional Administration
- Master in Information Technology
- Master of Science in Criminology
- Doctor of Medicine

=== Special program ===
- Graduates of Non-Education degrees shall take 18 units of Professional Education courses to qualify for the Licensure Examination for Teachers

== Curricular offerings ==
The university offers courses such as Bachelor of Education in Elementary and Secondary Education, Bachelor of Science in Computer Science, Criminology, and Commerce; Marketing and Management courses; Associate in Computer Technology; Bachelor of Arts in Liberal Arts majors in Psychology, Political Science and Mass Communication; and a Certificate of Teaching Proficiency for non-education graduates who want to pursue a teaching profession and a Certificate of Teaching in Early Childhood Education.

The graduate school offers MBA, MaEd, and Master in Criminology degrees. It also maintains a Center for Research and Extension Services and serves as a review center for teachers and criminology board exams.

== Scholarship ==
PLMun offers free tuition and exemption from other fees through the UNIFAST Law.

== See also ==
- Local colleges and universities (Philippines)
- Association of Local Colleges and Universities
