= Taguig City University =

Public university in Taguig, Philippines

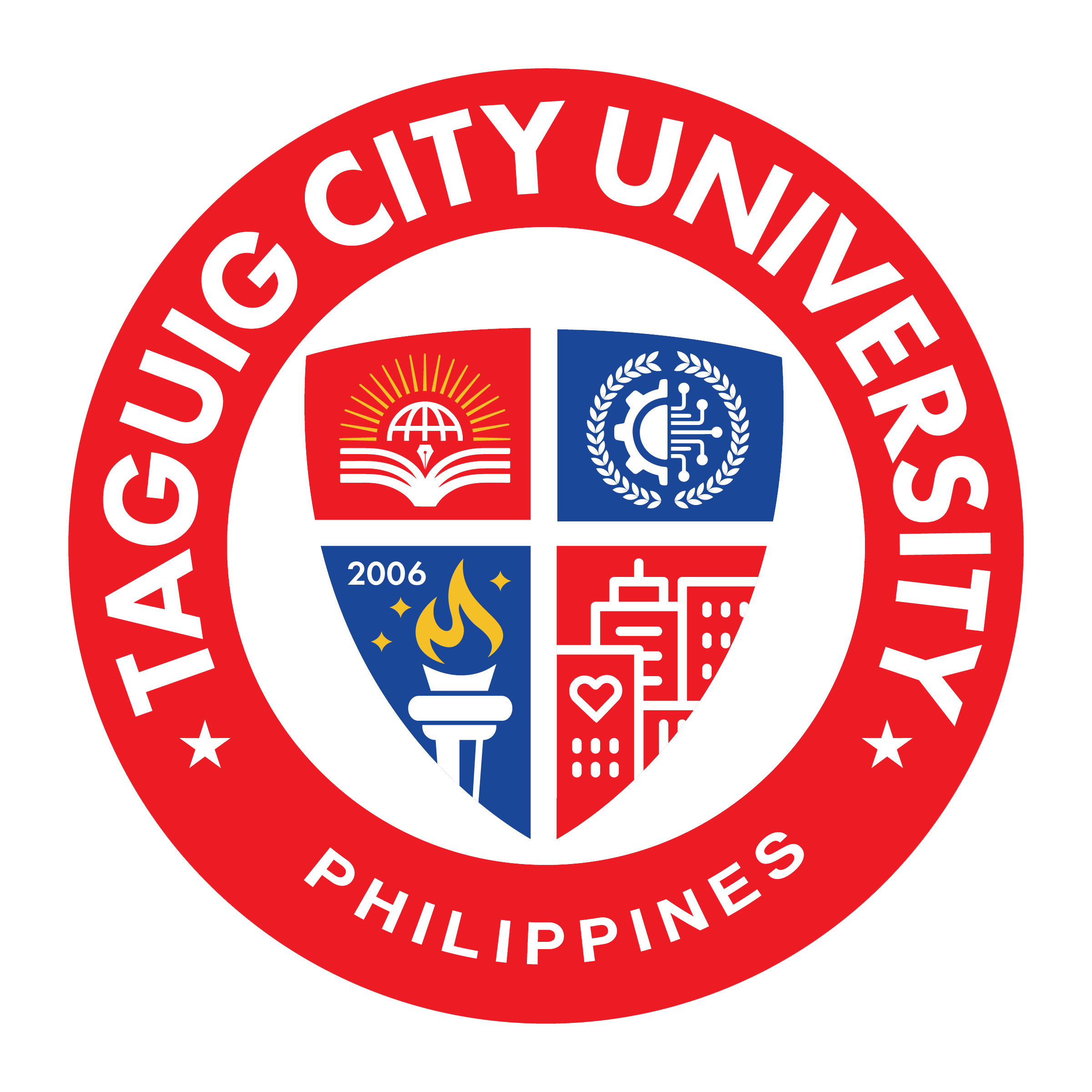
- Former name: Pamantasan ng Taguig (2006)
- Motto: Truth, Competence and Unity
- Type: Public, local university
- Established: 2006
- Accreditation: Association of Local Colleges and Universities Commission on Accreditation; Commission on Higher Education
- Affiliations: Association of Local Colleges and Universities
- President: Dr. Raymundo P. Arcega, CESE
- Faculty: Approx. 500
- Undergraduates: 8,000+ as of November, 2023
- Location: General Santos Avenue, Central Bicutan, Taguig, Metro Manila, Philippines; 14°29′28″N 121°03′20″E
- Campus: Urban
- Colors: Red and White
- Website: tcu.edu.ph
- Location in Metro Manila Location in Luzon Location in the Philippines

Taguig City University (TCU) is a public city university located in Central Bicutan, Taguig. It was established in 2006 by the City Government of Taguig by virtue of Ordinance No. 29 Series of 2004.

== History ==
Pamantasan ng Lungsod ng Taguig (PLT), later renamed Taguig City University (TCU) upon conversion of the Municipality of Taguig to "cityhood" on 8 December 2004, was established through Ordinance No. 29, Series of 2004 (enacted 6 September 2004, Municipal Government of Taguig, authored by Councilor Aurelio Paulo R. Bartolome with councilors Marisse Balina-Eron and Allan Paul C. Cruz as co-sponsors).

Motivated by the urgency of need to serve the youth of growing Taguig City, the Local Government Administration came up with Ordinance No. 29 Series of 2004 "An Ordinance Establishing the Pamantasan ng Taguig and Appropriating Funds Thereof." This was an offshoot of the provisions of the Local Government Code.

Pamantasan ng Taguig was renamed Taguig City University pursuant to City Ordinance No.13, Series of 2009.

TCU has gone through development problems — top billed by the very basic need to have enough buildings. For two years, despite its courage, the university hardly manifested physical eloquence. In S.Y. 2006–2007, it swiftly took off: The organization of the university and construction of the TCU main building commenced. Meanwhile, undergraduate classes were held in high schools and elementary campuses in Taguig, lent to the growing management of TCU. In 2006, General Ricardo Papa Sr. Memorial High School offered some rooms for free. In 2007, rooms expanded to Taguig Elementary School, Sta. Ana-District 1 and Em's Elementary School, Signal Village-District 2. In 2008-2009 additional undergraduate classes were held in annex school of General Ricardo Papa Sr. Memorial High School at Brgy. Ususan and Signal Village Elementary School (Annex).

Lack of classrooms did not deter the holding of graduate school classes. The graduate program in Master of Arts in Teaching major in Mathematics, Filipino, English and Social Sciences were lumped together as a common major. It paved the way to the development of the Master of Arts in Educational Management, while holding classes in a secluded and secured room at Sunshine Mall Taguig.

School year 2009-2010 reflected the metamorphosis of youthful Taguig City University, because in June all classes from undergraduate to graduate programs started to be held at the new main building of TCU; the rest became part of history.

On TCU's first year of operation, 2006–2007, the university was under the stewardship of the vice president for Academic Affairs, Tess Umali. The organization of the university and construction of the TCU main building were the highlights of this period. In 2007–2010, the first TCU president was vice mayor George Elias. During his term the construction of the main building was completed and curricular offerings were expanded. Year 2010 to the early part of 2011, TCU was under the reigns of Bro. Rolando Dizon who became instrumental in creating four schools: Graduate Studies; Education, Arts and Sciences; Engineering, Technology and Computer Sciences; Management, Entrepreneurship, and Criminology.

On April 4, 2011, Mayor Ma. Laarni "Lani" L. Cayetano installed Atty. Lutgardo B. Barbo as the third president of TCU. He is a former governor of Eastern Samar and secretary of the Philippine Senate. He was president of the Philippine Normal University, 2006–2010.

With the passage of the Republic Act 10931, or the free tuition law of 2017, TCU officially became tuition-free.

During the COVID-19 pandemic, 10 classrooms of the university were converted as "teaching hubs"; these were equipped with materials, technologies, and other resources in order for the university to adapt to the new normal. The city government also distributed 8,700 computer tablets to TCU students.

== Academics ==
TCU is composed of 7 colleges and a graduate school.

- College of Arts and Sciences (CAS)
- College of Business Management (CBM)
- College of Criminal Justice (CCJ)
- College of Education (CED)
- College of Engineering and Technology (CET)
- College of Hospitality and Tourism Management (CHTM)
- College of Information and Communication Technology (CICT)
- Graduate School (GS)

=== Tuition and financial aid ===
The university is tuition-free to the citizens of Taguig. All students enrolled at TCU receives ₱5,000 every semester. An additional ₱5,000 will be given to students who excel academically.

=== Research ===
TCU signed a partnership agreement with the National Research Council of the Philippines (NRCP) in order to enhance the university’s research undertakings.
