= Santa Elena School of Novaliches =

Roman Catholic school in Caloocan, Philippines

Sta. Elena School of Novaliches
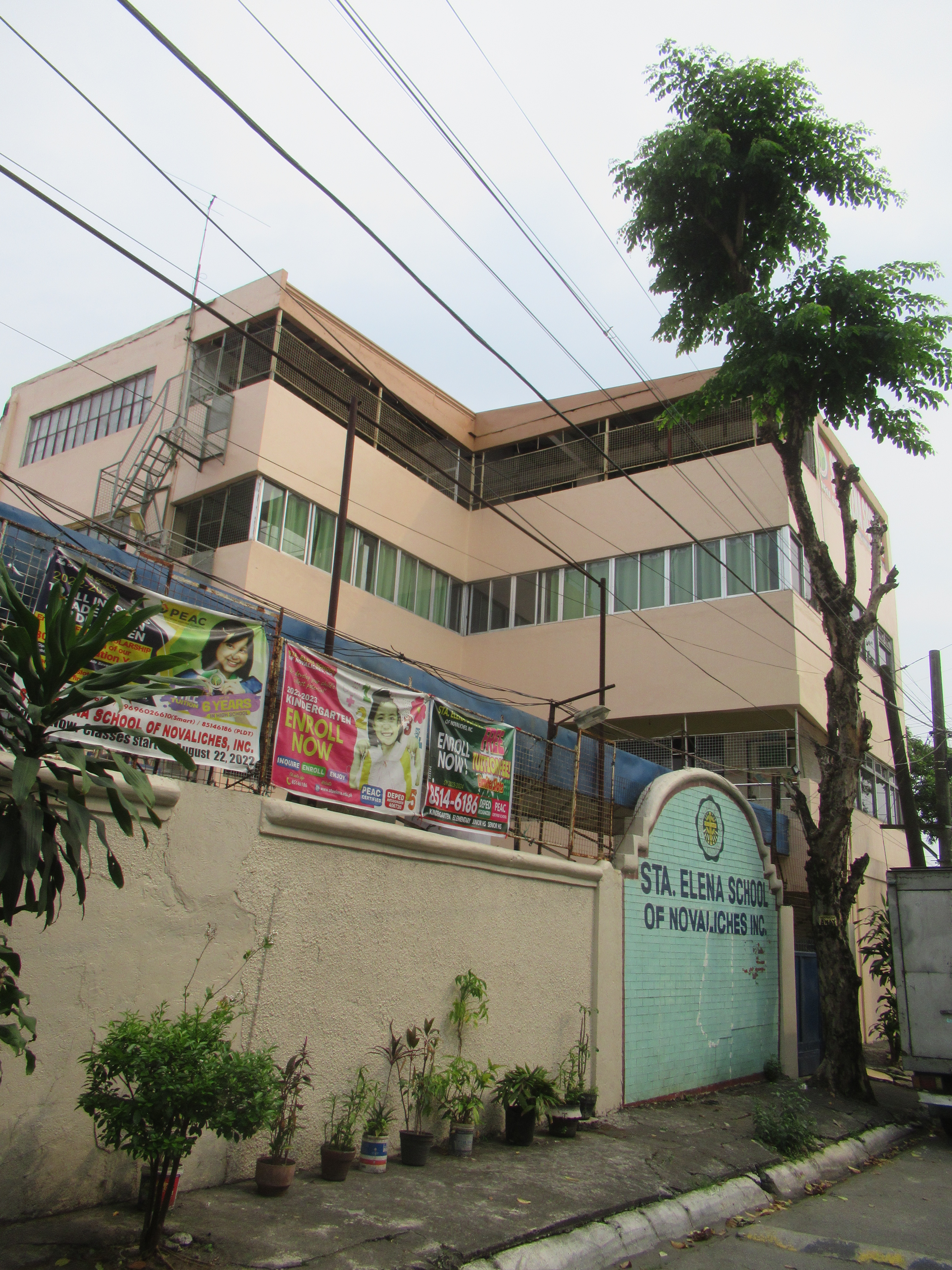
- Santa Elena School of Novaliches in April 2023

Location
- 2 Mercury Street, Constellation Homes, Zabarte, Novaliches; Caloocan; Philippines
- Coordinates: 14°44′37″N 121°02′48″E

Information
- Religious affiliation: Catholic

Sta. Elena School of Novaliches is a Catholic school in North Novaliches, Caloocan, Philippines.
