= Journalism Studies Association of the Philippines =

Journalism Studies Association of the Philippines, Inc.
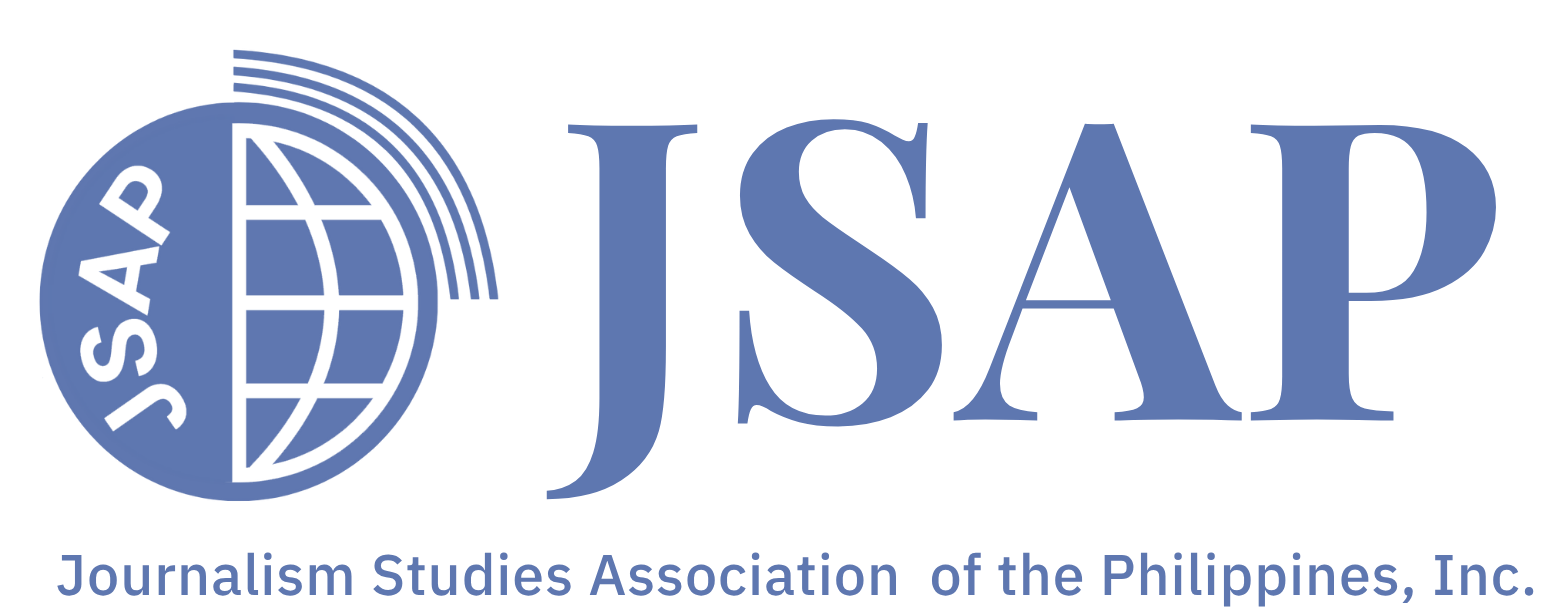
- Formation: October 2019; 7 years ago
- Type: Non-stock, non-profit corporation
- Headquarters: Quezon City, Philippines
- Chair: Lucia P. Tangi, DSD
- President: Felipe F. Salvosa II
- Vice President: Hemmady S. Mora
- Publication: JSAP Review
- Website: jsaponline.com

The Journalism Studies Association of the Philippines, Inc. (JSAP) is a Philippine professional organization of journalism educators and student publication advisers. Established in 2019, it promotes journalism education and research and has participated in public discussions on press freedom, campus journalism, and professional standards in the media.

== History ==
JSAP was established in October 2019 as a professional organization for journalism educators. The Philippine Social Science Council (PSSC) reported that the organization was established to promote journalism research and to focus on issues affecting journalism education and press freedom.

The formation of the association was initiated by Lucia P. Tangi, then chair of the UP Department of Journalism, following her research on journalism education in the Philippines. JSAP was publicly launched on March 6, 2020, at the UP College of Mass Communication, later renamed the College of Media and Communication.

One of its early activities was Journalism Education in the New Normal, a two-day webinar organized with the UP Department of Journalism in July 2020. PSSC reported that about 1,300 students, faculty members, and media practitioners attended the event, which focused on the teaching of journalism, including broadcast journalism, during the COVID-19 pandemic and the shift to online education.

On July 9, 2021, JSAP was registered with the Philippine Securities and Exchange Commission as a non-stock, non-profit corporation.

== National conferences ==
JSAP has held national conferences since 2021. The conferences bring together journalism educators, researchers, students, student publication advisers, and media practitioners for research presentations and discussions on journalism education and professional practice.

The first two conferences were conducted online. Quezon City University hosted the first in-person conference in 2023. The University of Santo Tomas in Manila hosted the 2024 conference, followed by the Polytechnic University of the Philippines in Manila in 2025.

The conferences have also addressed developments in professional journalism. Internews presented an ethical framework for the use of artificial intelligence in Philippine newsrooms at a JSAP national conference following consultations with news organizations and civil society groups.

== Press freedom and media issues ==
JSAP has participated in public debates concerning press freedom, campus journalism, and professional standards in the Philippine media.

In 2022, amid proposals to allow vloggers to cover Malacañan Palace, JSAP chair Lucia Tangi questioned how accreditation standards would address accountability and whether vloggers would be subject to professional and ethical standards comparable to those applied to journalists.

In February 2025, JSAP criticized Camarines Sur representative Luis Raymund Villafuerte after he attacked a student publication over the results of an election survey. The association described the incident as an assault on campus press freedom and cited constitutional protections for freedom of speech and of the press and the Campus Journalism Act of 1991.

JSAP has also participated in digital-literacy initiatives. In 2025, it was among the organizations involved in Juana Tech, a program led by the Cybercrime Investigation and Coordinating Center and civil society groups to promote digital literacy among women.

== Publication ==
JSAP publishes the JSAP Review, a peer-reviewed journal covering journalism and journalism studies, including journalism education, journalism ethics, digital and data journalism, political communication, and campus journalism.
