= City University of Pasay =

Public university in Pasay, Philippines

- Pamantasan ng Lungsod ng Pasay (Filipino)
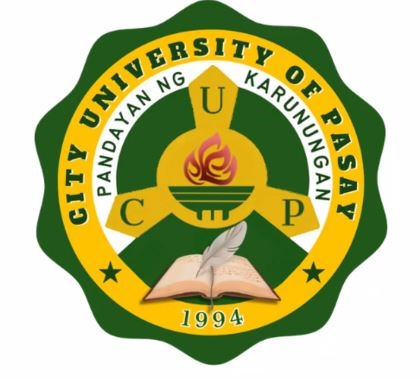
- Motto: Aim High, CUPians
- Type: Public
- Established: May 26, 1994; 32 years ago
- Academic affiliations: ALCU
- President: Dr. Rosanie F. Estuche
- Students: 12,134 (as of 2011)
- Location: Pasadeña St., F.B. Harrison, Pasay, Metro Manila, Philippines; 14°32′39″N 120°59′44″E
- Alma Mater song: CUP Hymn (Himno ng CUP)
- Colors: Green & white
- Nickname: Green Eagles
- Sporting affiliations: NAASCU
- Mascot: Eagle
- Location in Metro Manila Location in Luzon Location in the Philippines

City University of Pasay (Filipino: Pamantasan ng Lungsod ng Pasay), commonly abbreviated as CUPasay or CUP, is a city government-controlled, public university in Pasadeña St., F.B. Harrison, Pasay.

== History ==
The City University of Pasay was founded on May 26, 1994, through a city ordinance. The constitution was conceptualized by mayor Pablo Cuneta with the city councilors and other local officials.

The school started with 384 students and 11 faculty members, holding evening classes at the Pasay City West High School. Felimon Salas and his staff at the guidance research center composed the working group for the university. Amor Peñalosa and Estela Portugal paved the way toward the recognition of the university as an institution of higher learning leading to the approval of programs by the Commission on Higher Education (CHED).

== Academics ==
As of 2025, the university offers undergraduate degree programs in the areas of education, business administration, nursing, political science, and computer technology. The School of Graduate Studies offers graduate thesis track programs in both education management and public governance. Legal education is also available under the School of Law of the university.

The college serves as the research center maximizing the use of the faculty resources, data banking and research forum.

== Offered Programs ==
=== College of Arts and Sciences ===
- Bachelor of Arts in Political Science (ABPS)

=== College of Business Administration ===
- Bachelor of Business Administration (BSBA)
  - major in Financial Management
  - major in Human Resource Management
  - major in Marketing Management
  - major in Operations Management

=== College of Education ===
- Bachelor of Elementary Education (BEED)
- Bachelor of Secondary Education (BSE)
  - major in English
  - major in Filipino
  - major in General Science
  - major in Social Studies
  - major in Mathematics

=== College of Nursing and School of Midwifery ===
- Bachelor of Science in Nursing (BSN)

=== College of Office Administration and Computer Technology ===
- Associate in Computer Technology (ACT)
- Bachelor of Science in Office Administration (BSOA)

=== Graduate Studies ===
- Master of Arts in Education (MAEd)
  - major in Educational Management
- Master in Public Administration (MPA)
- Teaching Certificate Program (TCP)

=== School of Law ===
- Juris Doctor (JD)
