= Novaliches =

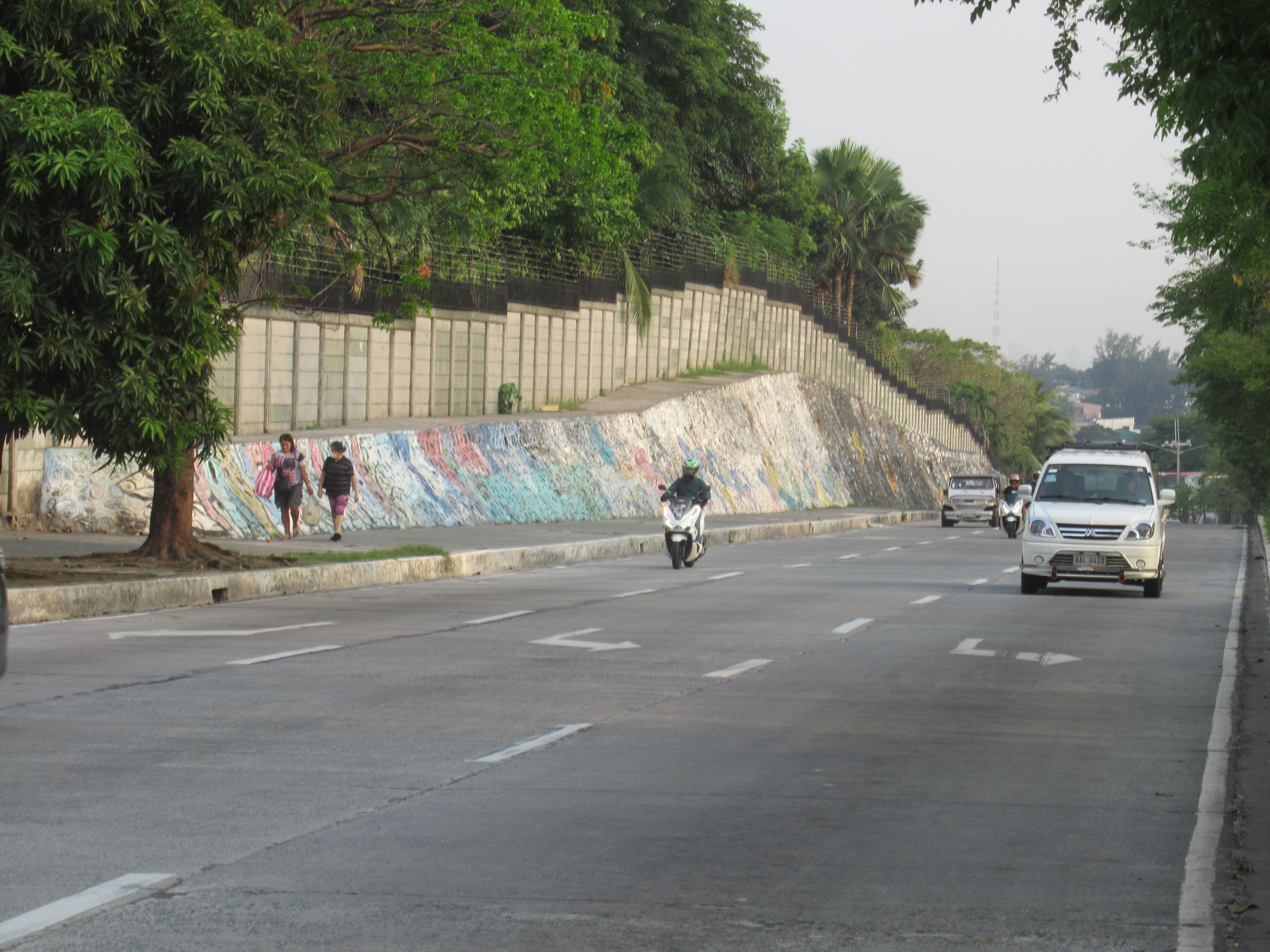
- Kaligayahan, Novaliches
- Country: Philippines
- Region: National Capital Region
- Cities: Caloocan, Quezon City
- Established: September 22, 1855
- Founder: Manuel Pavía y Lacy

Novaliches is a place that forms the northern areas of Quezon City, and encompasses the whole area of North Caloocan.

== Etymology ==
The village was named after the town Jérica, Spain, and was granted to General Manuel Pavía y Lacy, who served as a governor-general of the Philippines in 1854.

== History ==
Novaliches
- 1855–1903
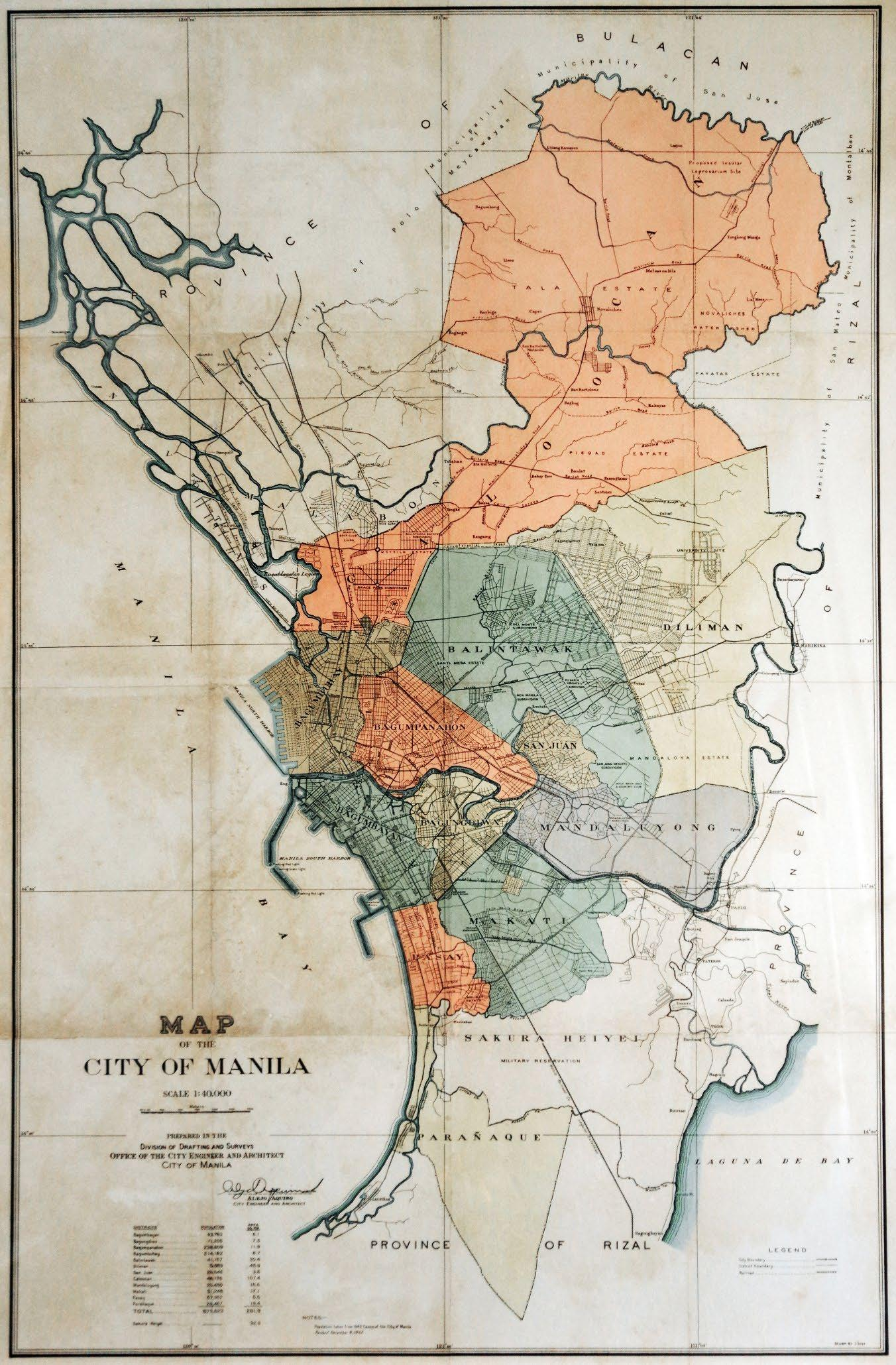
- Novaliches as part of Caloocan, 1942, still fully intact with its territory as a municipality until 1948
- Status: Former municipality of Bulacan (1855-1858), Manila (1858-1901), and Rizal (1901-1903)
- History
  - Established: September 22, 1855
  - Amalgamation from Bulacan to Tondo: 1858
  - Annexation to Caloocan: October 3, 1903

Population
  - 1898: 1,871
  - 1903: 1,556
| Preceded by | Succeeded by |
| Polo | Caloocan |
- Today part of: Metro Manila (Quezon City and Caloocan)

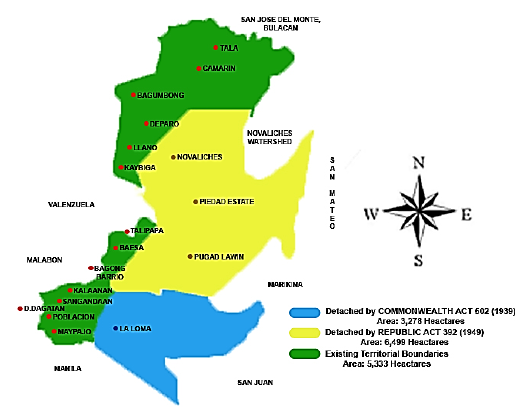
Territorial changes of Caloocan. Existing territorial boundaries. Detached by Commonwealth Act No. 502 (1939). Novaliches area. Detached by Republic Act No. 392 (1949).

Pavía y Lacy left for Manila on February 2, 1854 to assume duties there as the governor-general of the Philippines. His purpose was to create a penal colony in which prisoners were granted freedom after developing tracts of land. What woud eventually become a sizeable community was called Hacienda Tala. In the same year, the Alcalde mayor (equivalent to present-day governor) of Bulacan petitioned to the Spanish government to incorporate the haciendas of Malinta, Piedad, and Tala into a new town. The town was to be named "Novaliches" from the title "Marquis of Novaliches" of Pavía, who had recently been recalled to Spain.

On September 22, 1855, Novaliches was created as a municipality of Bulacan, separated from Polo (now Valenzuela). Three years later, it was transferred to the Province of Tondo (later renamed Manila in 1859) until 1901, when the town was transferred again to the newly created Rizal Province during the American regime. The United States Government enacted a reorganization of local government units as part of economic reforms, and Novaliches was absorbed by the neighboring town of Caloocan as a barrio on October 12, 1903, by virtue of Act No. 942 of the Philippine Commission. At that time, it was the largest barrio in the Philippines in terms of land area, measuring 10,000 hectares (25,000 acres). During World War II, Caloocan became part of the City of Greater Manila from 1942 to 1945.

In July 1948, Republic Act No. 333 was signed, making Quezon City as the Capital City of the Philippines, replacing Manila. This necessitated the expansion of Quezon City northward, beyond the La Mesa Watershed Reservation, and encompassing half of the former town. The other half, now known as North Caloocan, remains with Caloocan, which became a city in 1962. The division of Novaliches caused Caloocan to be divided into two parts. Since the 1960s, there were several attempts to reconstitute Novaliches as a separate municipality, all of which were unsuccessful.

On February 23, 1998, President Fidel V. Ramos signed Republic Act No. 8535, which would make Novaliches into its own city. 15 barangays were to be taken out from Quezon City to form the proposed new city. However, it lost in the plebiscite held in the whole of Quezon City on October 23, 1999. At present, the part of Novaliches belonging to Quezon City is divided into two congressional districts, which represents it in the House of Representatives of the Philippines.

== Barangays ==
Barangays of Novaliches in Quezon City
| Barangay | Legislative district | Population (2024) |
|---|---|---|
| Bagbag | QC 5th District | 66,268 |
| Capri | QC 5th District | 12,940 |
| Fairview | QC 5th District | 63,913 |
| Greater Lagro | QC 5th District | 24,104 |
| Gulod | QC 5th District | 63,651 |
| Kaligayahan | QC 5th District | 62,132 |
| Nagkaisang Nayon | QC 5th District | 54,477 |
| North Fairview | QC 5th District | 47,019 |
| Novaliches Proper (Bayan/Poblacion) | QC 5th District | 16,096 |
| Pasong Putik Proper | QC 5th District | 40,919 |
| San Agustin | QC 5th District | 26,034 |
| San Bartolome | QC 5th District | 51,472 |
| Santa Lucia | QC 5th District | 28,974 |
| Santa Monica | QC 5th District | 52,203 |
| Baesa | QC 6th District | 56,514 |
| Pasong Tamo | QC 6th District | 113,319 |
| Sangandaan | QC 6th District | 22,847 |
| Sauyo | QC 6th District | 77,274 |
| Talipapa | QC 6th District | 39,244 |
| Tandang Sora | QC 6th District | 86,005 |

Barangays of Novaliches in Caloocan City
| Barangay | Area | Legislative district | Population (2024) |
|---|---|---|---|
| Barangay 164 | Talipapa | 1st district | 20,207 |
| Barangay 165 | Bagbaguin | 1st district | 27,597 |
| Barangay 166 | Kaybiga | 1st district | 21,144 |
| Barangay 167 | Llano | 1st district | 58,357 |
| Barangay 168 | Deparo | 1st district | 37,107 |
| Barangay 169 | BF Homes Caloocan | 1st district | 5,057 |
| Barangay 170 | Deparo | 1st district | 13,401 |
| Barangay 171 | Bagumbong | 1st district | 116,013 |
| Barangay 172 | Urduja | 1st district | 23,849 |
| Barangay 173 | Congress | 1st district | 15,702 |
| Barangay 174 | Camarin | 1st district | 25,538 |
| Barangay 175 | Camarin | 1st district | 74,760 |
| Barangay 176-A | Bagong Silang | 1st district | 48,719 |
| Barangay 176-B | Bagong Silang | 1st district | 43,135 |
| Barangay 176-C | Bagong Silang | 1st district | 39,837 |
| Barangay 176-D | Bagong Silang | 1st district | 50,940 |
| Barangay 176-E | Bagong Silang | 1st district | 53,341 |
| Barangay 176-F | Bagong Silang | 1st district | 30,953 |
| Barangay 177 | Camarin | 1st district | 87,381 |
| Barangay 178 | Camarin | 3rd district | 112,582 |
| Barangay 179 | Camarin | 3rd district | 48,602 |
| Barangay 180 | Tala | 3rd district | 19,513 |
| Barangay 181 | Pangarap Village | 3rd district | 22,582 |
| Barangay 182 | Pangarap Village | 3rd district | 9,621 |
| Barangay 183 | Tala | 3rd district | 7,634 |
| Barangay 184 | Tala | 3rd district | 3,139 |
| Barangay 185 | Tala | 3rd district | 28,005 |
| Barangay 186 | Tala | 3rd district | 26,285 |
| Barangay 187 | Tala | 3rd district | 25,566 |
| Barangay 188 | Tala | 3rd district | 33,787 |

== Education ==
The main campus of Quezon City University is located on San Bartolome, along Quirino Highway. The northern Caloocan portion of the district hosts two campuses of the University of Caloocan City. Well-known private educational institutions include the National University Fairview, School of St. Anthony, Sacred Heart Academy of Novaliches, La Consolacion College Novaliches, the School of the Holy Spirit of Quezon City, FEU Diliman, and FEU-NRMF.

== In popular culture ==
- On the debut album of Filipino rock band Rocksteddy entitled Tsubtsatagilidakeyn, there is a song called "Super Nova" which pays homage to the district. The song was re-recorded for their 2017 Ang Album Na May Pinakamahabang Pamagat and was re-titled as "Supernovaliches (Re-Recorded)".
