= Bacolod City College =

Public college in Negros Occidental, Philippines

- Dalubhasaang Lungsod ng Bacolod (Filipino)
- Motto: "We serve, we educate, we give hope"
- Type: Community college, Local college
- Established: 1997; 29 years ago
- President: Ma. Johanna Ann R. Bayoneta, Ph.D.
- Administrative staff: approximately 30
- Undergraduates: approximately 4,000
- Location: Taculing Road, Bacolod, Negros Occidental, Philippines; 10°39′20″N 122°57′14″E
- Campus: Urban Main: Taculing Campus Satellite: Sum-ag Campus
- Website: www.bacolodcitycollege.com
- Location in the Visayas Location in the Philippines

Bacolod City College (BCC) is a local community college operated by the local government of Bacolod, Negros Occidental, Philippines. The college was legally established by virtue of City Ordinance No. 175, Series of 1997. City Ordinance No. 175, series of 1997 was known as the Charter of Bacolod City College. It was passed by the Sangguniang Panglungsod with a majority vote on April 10, 1997, and was approved by the City Mayor on April 16, 1997.

The school currently has 2 constituent campuses. These are the Taculing Campus and the Sum-ag Campus.

== See also ==
- List of tertiary schools in Bacolod City
