= PNTC Colleges =

Private college in Cavite, Philippines

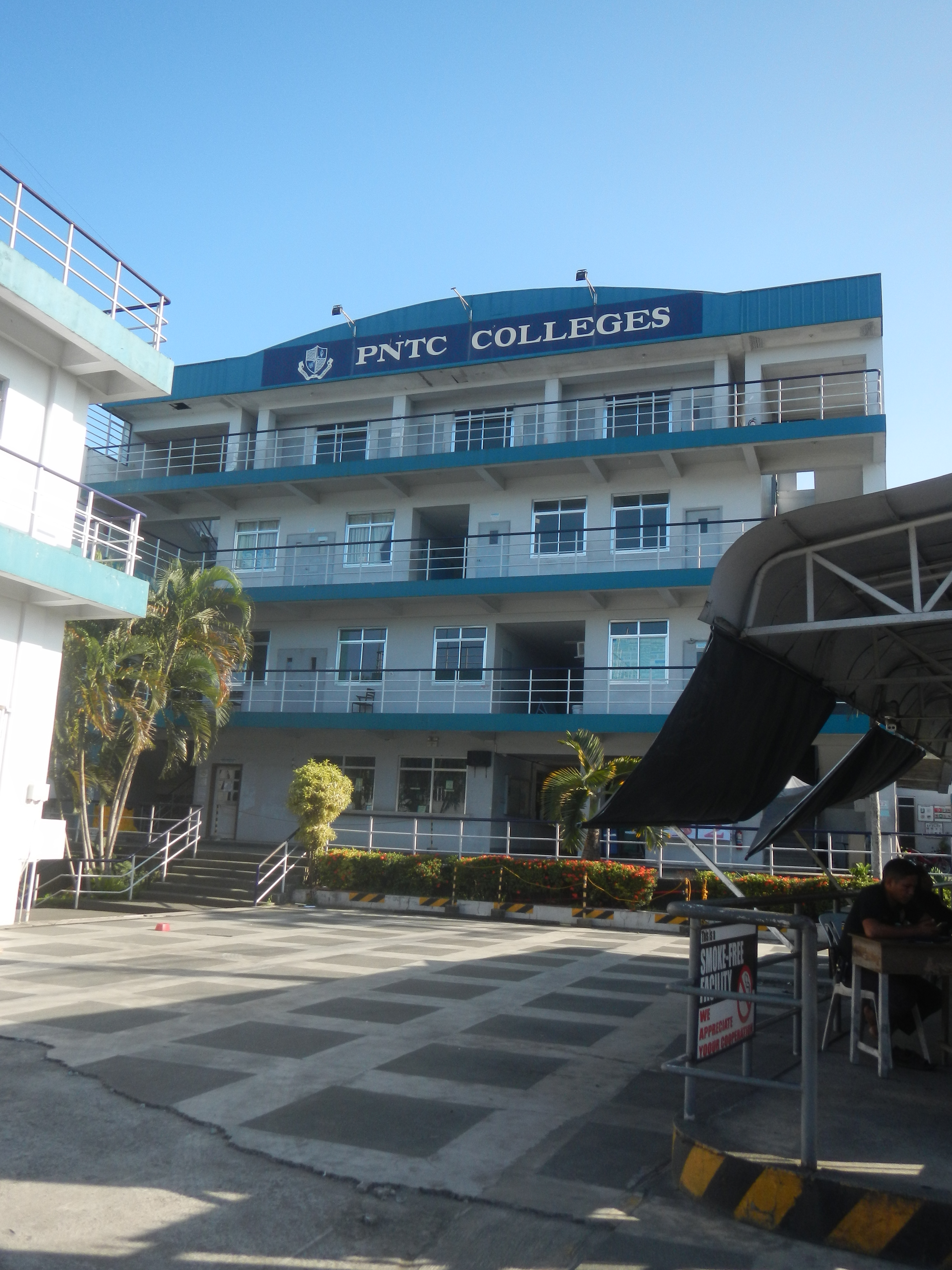
- Motto: Virtus et Qualitas
- Motto in English: Virtue and Quality
- Type: Private, Non-sectarian Higher Education, and Maritime Education and Training
- Established: April 18, 1994
- Location: Cavite Campus (Dasmariñas, Cavite); Maritime Training Center (Intramuros, Manila); Multi-Training Facility (Tanza, Cavite); 14°19′04″N 120°56′02″E
- Website: www.pntc.edu.ph
- Location in Luzon Location in the Philippines

PNTC Colleges, formerly known as Philippine Nautical and Technological College, is a private, non-sectarian Higher Education Institution (HEI) and a Maritime Training Institution (MTI) in the Philippines.

As an HEI, PNTC Colleges offers Bachelor of Science in Marine Transportation (BSMT), Bachelor of Science in Marine Engineering (BSMarE), Bachelor of Science in Customs Administration (BSCA), Bachelor of Science in Accountancy (BSA), Bachelor of Science in Accounting Technology (BSAT), and Bachelor of Science in Business Administration (BSBA), major in Marketing and Operations Management.

As an MTI, PNTC Colleges offers courses pursuant to the 1978 IMO Convention on the Standards of Training, Certification and Watchkeeping for Seafarers (STCW), as amended.

== History ==
Founded on April 18, 1994 by Atty. Hernani N. Fabia, PNTC Colleges was originally named as Philippine Nautical Training Institute or PNTI. Its primary purpose then was to provide basic and specialized courses pursuant to the 1978 International Maritime Organization (IMO) and the convention on Standards of Training, Certification and Watchkeeping for Seafarers (STCW).

On December 6, 2001, PNTI became Philippine Nautical and Technological College with the intention to expand its primary purpose to operate as a maritime institution with three-fold functions, i.e., as a Maritime College, Maritime Training Center and a Seafarers Competency Assessment Center. The name change highlighted the expansion as PNTC began to offer college courses such as Bachelor of Science in Marine Engineering, Bachelor of Science in Marine Transportation and Bachelor of Science in Customs Administration.

On October 29, 2004, Philippine Nautical and Technological College was changed to simply PNTC Colleges, which has now become the official name.
