= Valenzuela City Technological College =

Technical college in Valenzuela, Philippines

Coordinates: 14°41′56″N 120°59′42″E

- Former names: Valenzuela City Polytechnic College (ValPoly)
- Type: Public local technical college
- Affiliations: City Government of Valenzuela, TESDA
- Location: Barangay Parada, Valenzuela City, Philippines
- Campus: Urban

Valenzuela City Technological College (formerly known as Valenzuela City Polytechnic College or ValPoly) is a public technical college located in Barangay Parada, Valenzuela City, Philippines. Funded and managed by the local city government, the institution primarily offers technical, vocational, and engineering technology programs aimed at preparing students for highly specialized and in-demand industries.

== History ==
Originally known as Valenzuela City Polytechnic College (ValPoly), the institution has been operated and funded by the Valenzuela City government to provide free and accessible tertiary and technical education to its eligible residents.

In July 2023, the institution was officially renamed Valenzuela City Technological College (ValTech). This rebranding was part of the local government's "Valenzuela Life" initiative, which aimed to modernize the city's technical education and align the institution's offerings with evolving, high-tech industry demands.

== Campus ==
On August 11, 2025, Mayor Weslie Gatchalian inaugurated a newly built and expanded campus located in Barangay Parada. The facility was designed around four specialized "learning factories" dedicated to railway technology, mechatronics, automotive technology, and electronics. Furthermore, the campus features six computer laboratories equipped with nearly 300 units to support information and communication technology (ICT) operations.

A prominent landmark within the new campus is the Sikhay sculpture. Designed by the mayor, the artwork merges the Filipino words sikap (perseverance) and husay (excellence) to symbolize the institution's core educational philosophy.

== Academic programs ==
ValTech offers specialized technical degree programs alongside short-term courses certified by the Technical Education and Skills Development Authority (TESDA).

The college's curriculum is heavily tailored toward high-demand industries. Notably, its Railway Technology program was specifically developed to address the local manpower requirements for major national infrastructure projects, including the North–South Commuter Railway and the Metro Manila Subway systems. Additionally, the college recently secured TESDA approval to offer a specialized program in cybersecurity.

To ensure graduates are immediately employable, ValTech maintains direct partnerships with private industry leaders. In November 2025, the college partnered with Isuzu Philippines Corporation (IPC) to elevate its automotive training programs. Through this collaboration, IPC donated vehicles, vital automotive components, and workshop tools to launch a comprehensive Diesel Technology Training Program for ValTech students.
