= Mabalacat City College =

Public college in Pampanga, Philippines

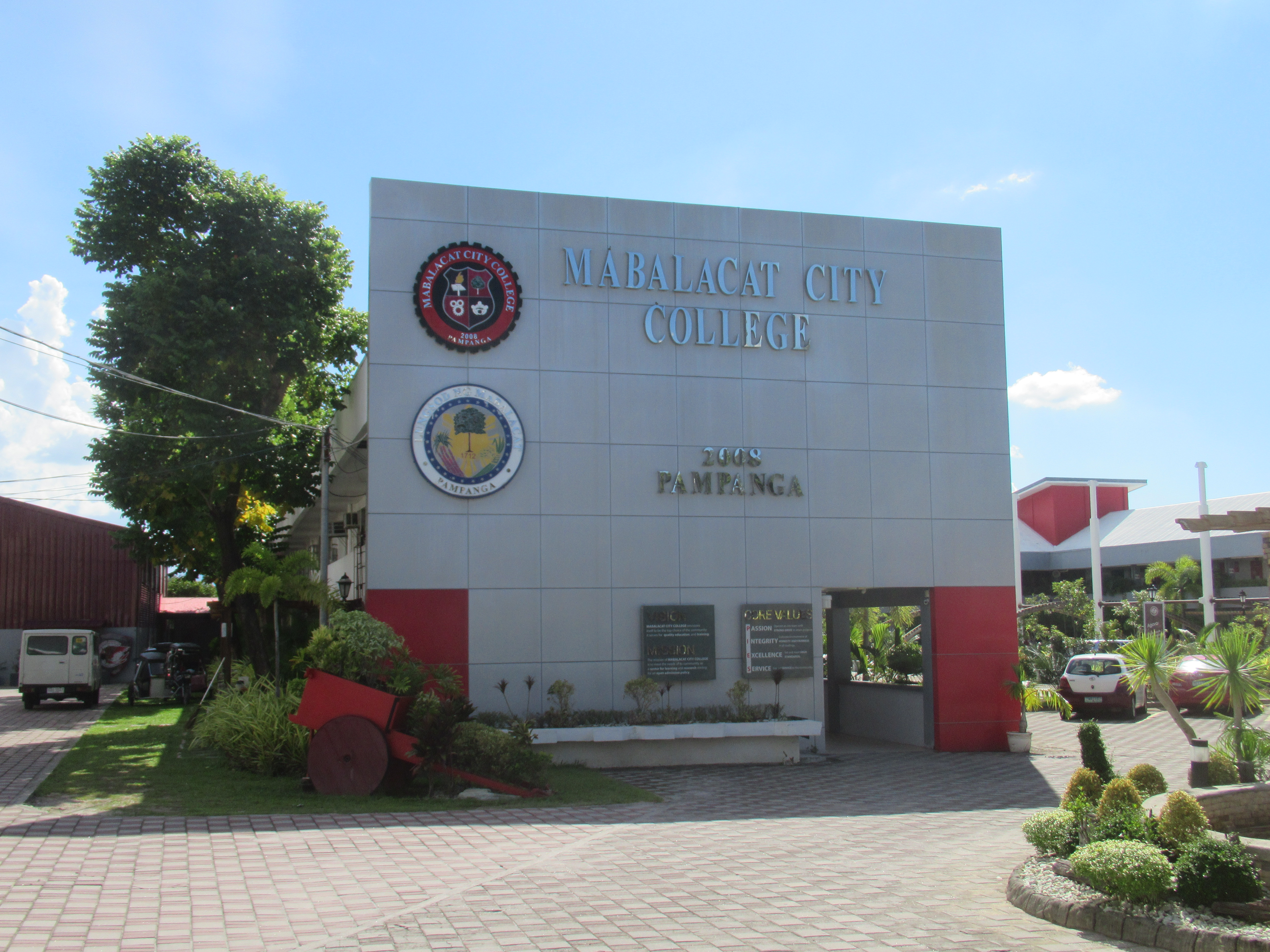
- Motto: Start Here, Be Successful Anywhere!
- Type: Local College
- Established: 2008
- President: Dr. Michelle A. Ong
- Students: 3000
- Location: Dolores, Mabalacat, Philippines; 15°14′30″N 120°34′03″E
- Colors: Red & Grey
- Nickname: The MCCians
- Website: http://mcc.edu.ph/
- Location in Luzon Location in the Philippines

Mabalacat City College (MCC) , formerly Mabalacat College, is an institution of higher learning funded and managed by the Mabalacat City government, Pampanga, Philippines.

== History ==
Mabalacat College was established in 2008.

After a series of feasibility studies, it was formally opened in September 2008. The legal foundation of the college was formulated by the Sangguniang Bayan members. On October 4, 2008, Municipal Ordinance No. 2, series of 2007 entitled "An ordinance establishing a local College in the Municipality of Mabalacat to be known as the Mabalacat City College and granting its charter providing for the Rules, Regulations and Pertinent Guidelines for its establishment and operation thereof," was passed.

On January 14, 2008, Former Mayor Morales appointed Dr. Leonardo C. Canlas as the first ad interim president of the college. The initial courses offered were BS in Elementary Education, BS in Secondary Education with major fields in mathematics and biological science, and BS in information technology.

As of August 2025, the school offers 21 courses in its 4 Institutes.

== Facilities ==
During the COVID-19 pandemic, the Mabalacat City Government implemented the construction of a new basketball gymnasium, new IT rooms, and a new cafeteria inside MCC. For the school year 2022-23, they launched pilot smart classrooms, which were equipped with cameras for observing human behavior, microphones, monitors, interactive screens and boards, and soundproof walls. In 2023, MCC inaugurated its MCC Learning Center, MCC Gymnasium and the i-Lab laboratory.

== Academic departments ==
- Institute of Teacher Education (ITE)
  - Bachelor of Early Childhood Education.
  - Bachelor of Elementary Education
  - Bachelor of Physical Education
  - Bachelor of Secondary Education, Major in English
  - Bachelor of Secondary Education, Major in Filipino
  - Bachelor of Secondary Education, Major in Math
  - Bachelor of Secondary Education, Major in Science
  - Bachelor of Secondary Education, Major in Social Studies
  - Bachelor of Technical- Vocational Teacher Education
- Institute of Business and Computing Education (IBCE)
  - Bachelor of Science in Information Technology
  - Bachelor of Science in Accountancy
  - Bachelor of Science in Customs Administration
  - Bachelor of Science in Entrepreneurship
  - Bachelor of Science in Management Accounting
  - Bachelor of Science in Office Administration
- Institute of Hospitality and Tourism Management (IHTM)
  - Bachelor of Science in Hospitality Management
  - Bachelor of Science in Tourism Management
- Institute of Arts and Sciences (IAS)
  - Bachelor of Arts in History
  - Bachelor of Science in Biology
  - Bachelor of Science in Legal Management

== Athletics ==
In 2025, Malabacat City College became a member of the United Central Luzon Athletic Association (UCLAA) during its 10th season. Their sports teams are known as the Crimson Tribes.
