= Cagayan State University =

Public university in the Philippines

- Pamantasang Pampamahalaan ng Cagayan (Filipino)
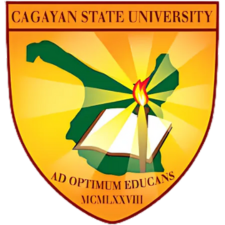
- Motto: Ad Optimum Educans
- Motto in English: Educating for the best
- Type: Public
- Established: June 11, 1978; 48 years ago
- Officer in charge: Dr. Arthur G. Ibanez, ASEAN Engr.
- Administrative staff: 846
- Undergraduates: 41,000
- Postgraduates: 1,500
- Location: Caritan Sur, Tuguegarao City, Cagayan; 18°26′35″N 121°48′39″E
- Campus: 9 Campuses, Main Campus-Andrews Campus
- Hymn: CSU Hymn
- Colors: Maroon and Gold
- Nickname: Maroons
- Mascot: Athena
- Website: csu.edu.ph
- Location in Luzon Location in the Philippines

Cagayan State University (known as CSU), is a tertiary educational institution in the Philippine province of Cagayan. It was established through a Presidential Decree No. 1436.

CSU operates nine satellite campuses and two extension campuses across the province.

== Administration ==
=== Board of regents ===
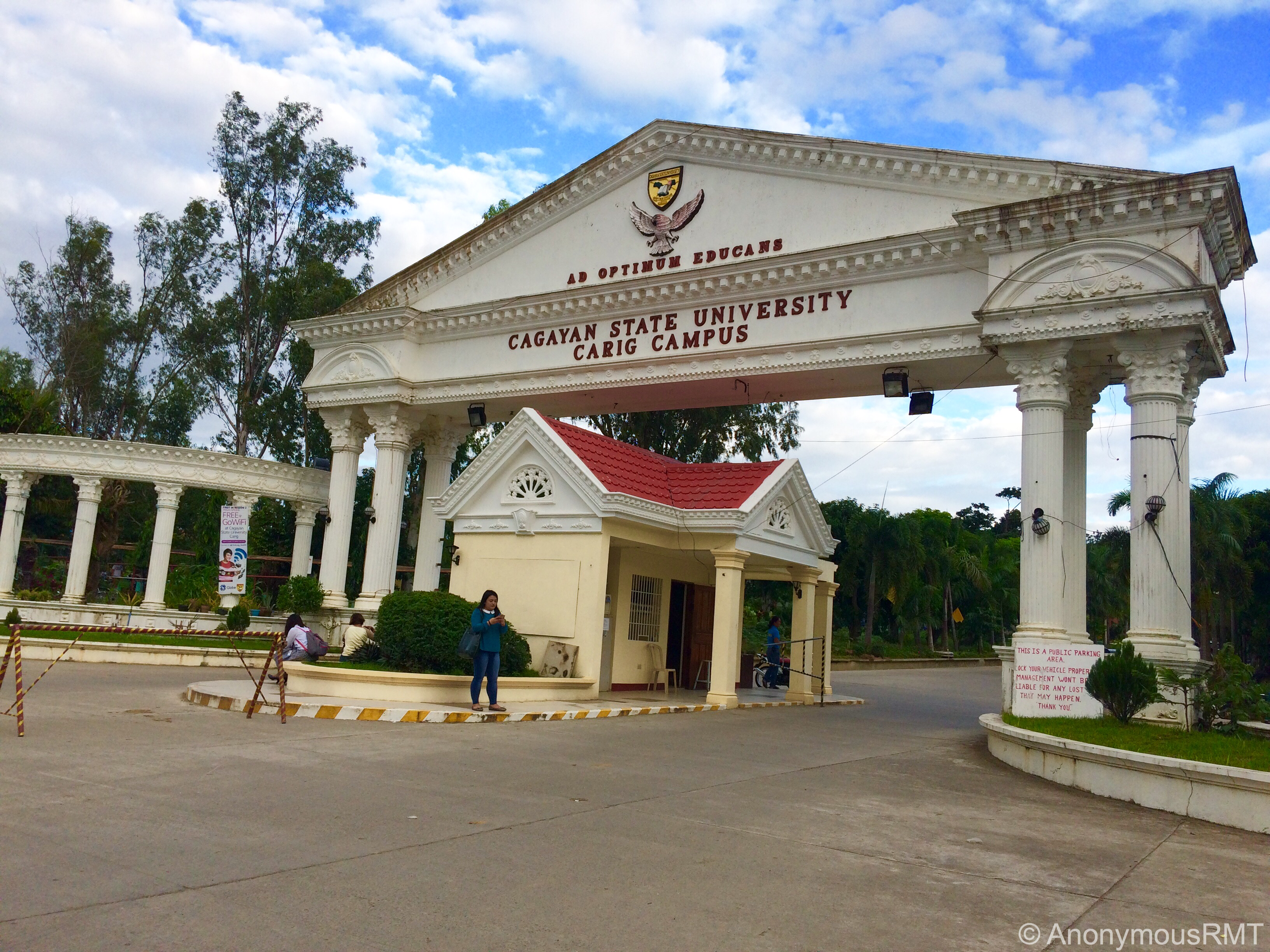
Cagayan State University — Carig Campus

Cagayan State University's governance is vested in the Board of Regents, which has 12 members and is the highest decision-making body in the CSU system.

The CSU Board of Regents is composed of a commissioner of the Commission on Higher Education (CHED), the president of Cagayan State University, the chairpersons of the Committees on Higher Education of the Senate and House of Representatives, the president of the University Student Government, the faculty regent, and the president of the CSU Alumni Association. Two members of the board come from the private sector.

The Board of Regents
| Chairperson, CSU BOR | Hon. Shirley C. Agrupis | Chairperson, Commission on Higher Education |
| Vice-Chairperson | Hon. Arthur G. Ibañez | OIC, Office of the University President, Cagayan State University |
| Member | Hon. Joel Villanueva; Represented by Hon. Charo Soriano | Chairperson, Senate Committee on Higher, Technical and Vocational Education |
| Member | Hon. Joel Villanueva; Represented by Hon. Charo Soriano | City Councilor of Tuguegarao City, |
| Member | Hon. Jude A. Acidre; Represented by Hon. Joseph Lara | Chairperson, House Committee on Higher and Technical Education |
| Member | Hon. Jude A. Acidre; Represented by Hon. Joseph Lara | 3rd District Representative, Province of Cagayan |
| Member | Hon. Dionisio C. Ledres Jr. | Regional Director, NEDA RO2 |
| Member | Hon. Virginia G. Bilgera | Regional Director, DOST RO2 |
| Member | Hon. Rose Mary G. Aquino | Regional Executive Director, DA RO2 |
| Member | Hon. Ricardo B. Casauay | Faculty Representative |
| Member | Hon. Carmelo O. Villacete | Alumni Representative |
| Member | Hon. Julius Ceazar C. Balayan | Student Representative |
| Member | Hon. Joselito K. Luna | Private Sector Representative |
| Member | Hon. Noel T. Veridiano II | Private Sector Representative |
| Member | Atty. April Gayle U. Soller | Acting Board Secretary |

=== President of the Cagayan State University ===
Presidents of Cagayan State University
Manuel T. Corpuz (1979–1989)
Armando C. Cortes (1989–2001)
Roger P. Perez (2004–2012)
Romeo R. Quilang (2012–2016)
Urdujah G. Alvarado (2016–2024)
Arthur G. Ibañez (2024–present)

The president of Cagayan State University is elected by the university's 12-member Board of the Regents for a six-year term. The current Officer-in-Charge President, Arthur G. Ibañez, is an engineer and former Campus Executive Officer of CSU Carig.

=== Vice presidents ===
Vice presidents
| Academic Affairs | Mariden Ventura-Cauilan, DPA |
| Administration and Finance | Engr. Theresa B. Dimalanta, PhD |
| Research Development, Extension and Training | Engr. Audry R. Quebral, DPA |
| Partnership and Resource Mobilization | Ana Marie Cristina C. Cauilan, PhD |

=== Campus executive officers ===
| Campus | Campus executive officers |
|---|---|
| Andrews | Terence Alfredo Roberto A. Tejada, MBA |
| Aparri | Engr. Policarpio L. Mabborang, DPA |
| Carig | Engr. Roger P. Rumpon |
| Gonzaga | Froilan A. Pacris Jr, PhD |
| Lal-lo | Engr. James B. Cabildo |
| Lasam | Florante Victor M. Balatico, PhD |
| Piat | Hitler C. Dangatan, PhD |
| Sanchez Mira | Rodel Francisco T. Alegado, PhD |
| Solana | Engr. Ma. Haidee A. Mabborang, PhD |

== Colleges ==
- College of Agriculture
- College of Allied Health Sciences
- College of Natural Sciences & Mathematics
- College of Business Entrepreneurship & Accountancy
- College of Criminal Justice Education
- College of Teachers Education
- College of Engineering & Architecture
- College of Fisheries and Aquatic Science
- College of Humanities and Social Sciences
- College of Hospitality & Industry Management
- College of Human Kinetics
- College of Information & Computing Sciences
- College of Law
- College of Medicine and Surgery
- College of Public Administration
- College of Industrial Technology
- College of Veterinary Medicine
- Graduate school

== Campuses ==
- Cagayan State University – Andrews Campus
- Cagayan State University – Aparri Campus
- Cagayan State University – Carig Campus
- Cagayan State University – Gonzaga Campus
- Cagayan State University – Lallo Campus
- Cagayan State University – Lasam Campus
- Cagayan State University – Piat Campus
- Cagayan State University – Sanchez Mira Campus
- Cagayan State University – Solana Campus
