= Quezon City University =

Public university in Quezon City, Philippines

- Pamantasan ng Lungsod Quezon (Filipino)
- The No. 1 Local University of Employable Graduates
- Former names: Quezon City Skills Training Center (1986–1994); Quezon City Polytechnic (1994–2001); Quezon City Polytechnic University (2001–2019)
- Type: Public Nonsectarian higher education institution
- Established: March 1, 1994; 32 years ago
- Academic affiliations: Association of Local Colleges and Universities
- President: Dr. Theresita V. Atienza
- Academic staff: 300
- Administrative staff: 100
- Students: 8,693 (2019–20)
- Location: 673 Quirino Highway, San Bartolome, Novaliches, Quezon City, Metro Manila, Philippines; 14°42′0.33″N 121°2′3.57″E
- Campus: Urban Main: Novaliches, Quezon City 4 hectares (40,000 m^{2}) Satellite: Barangay Sto. Cristo, Quezon City; Barangay Batasan Hills, Quezon City
- Medium of instruction: English and Filipino
- Colors: Blue, Red and Yellow
- Website: www.qcu.edu.ph
- Location in Metro Manila Location in Luzon Location in the Philippines

Quezon City University (QCU), formerly known as Quezon City Polytechnic University (QCPU), is a city government-funded university in Quezon City, Philippines. It was established on March 1, 1994, as the Quezon City Polytechnic, offering technical and vocational courses. It was renamed as Quezon City Polytechnic University when it was elevated into university status in 2001. Twenty years later in 2021, QCPU was renamed Quezon City University.

== History ==
In 1988, the Quezon City Council passed an ordinance to create a technical committee that conducted a series of studies on the establishment of a Quezon City Polytechnic University. The committee was composed of Quezon City officials—with QC mayor as the chairman, QC vice mayor as the co-chairman, QC chairman of the Committee on Education as the vice chairman; while the QC treasurer, the director of the Bureau of Higher Education (Department of Education, Culture and Sports), a former University of the Philippines president, representatives from Pamantasan ng Lungsod ng Maynila, Technological University of the Philippines and Polytechnic University of the Philippines, and four members of the City Council were part of the technical committee as members.

As a result of the studies and to kick-off the establishment of Quezon City's local university, the Quezon City Polytechnic was created on March 1, 1994, by virtue of City Council Ordinance No. SP-0171 for the training and development of skilled and technical workers.

Three-year associate programs were introduced in the Polytechnic in the 1994–1995 academic year, which were designed to develop highly competent technicians for industry in the areas of automotive technology, electrical technology, welding technology, refrigeration and air-conditioning technology, and fashion technology. In the following academic year, the institution offered additional three-year associate programs for electronics technology, mechanical technology or machine shop, computer technology and an industry-led pilot course in boiler technology. The Polytechnic established its reputation among local government units as a show window and model technology-based institution paving the way for its recognition by the Technical Education and Skills Development Authority (TESDA) and developing a strong alliance with the Japan International Cooperation Agency (JICA).

In 1997, SP-544, S-97, was passed by the Quezon City Council authorizing the city government to establish its own higher education institution through the enhancement of the existing Quezon City Polytechnic to Pamantansang Politekniko ng Lungsod Quezon or Quezon City Polytechnic University. After years of preparations and budget allocations, the Quezon City Council enacted City Ordinance No. SP-1030, S-2001, providing for the charter and formal establishment of Pamantasang Politeknikal ng Lungsod Quezon or Quezon City Polytechnic University and strengthened its management. The university started offering bachelor's degree programs for entrepreneurial management, industrial engineering and information technology in the 2005–2006 academic year.

The Quezon City Council amended the university's charter in 2009 through the enactment of City Ordinance SP-1945, S-2009. This was to provide further fiscal and administrative autonomy to the university and help the institution to optimize its academic initiatives and creativity. The ordinance allowed the university to enhance its bachelor's degree offerings; the curriculum of information technology and entrepreneurship (previously known in the university as entrepreneurial management) programs have been improved in the 2010–2011 academic year. In the following academic year, the bachelor's degree program for electronics engineering began admitting students.

To support the K–12 initiative of the national government, the university started temporarily offering senior high school programs (ABM, STEM and TechVoc strands) through the enactment of City Ordinance SP-2308 in 2014. The QCPU Senior High School started accepting students from the 2016–2017 academic year until the 2020–2021 academic year.

In the 2019–2020 academic year, the Quezon City Polytechnic University was converted to the Quezon City University to align with Republic Act 10931, also known as the Universal Access to Quality Tertiary Education Act, which aims to provide free higher education in state universities and colleges. This has been enacted by the Quezon City Council through SP-2812, also known as the Quezon City University Charter of 2019. In the same academic year, the university started offering bachelor's degree in accountancy.

The Commission on Higher Education in June 2021, formally recognized QCU through the awarding of institutional recognition (IR) to the university. With this all QCU students will now enjoy free tuition as stipulated in the free tuition law.

== Campuses ==
=== San Bartolome (Main Campus) ===
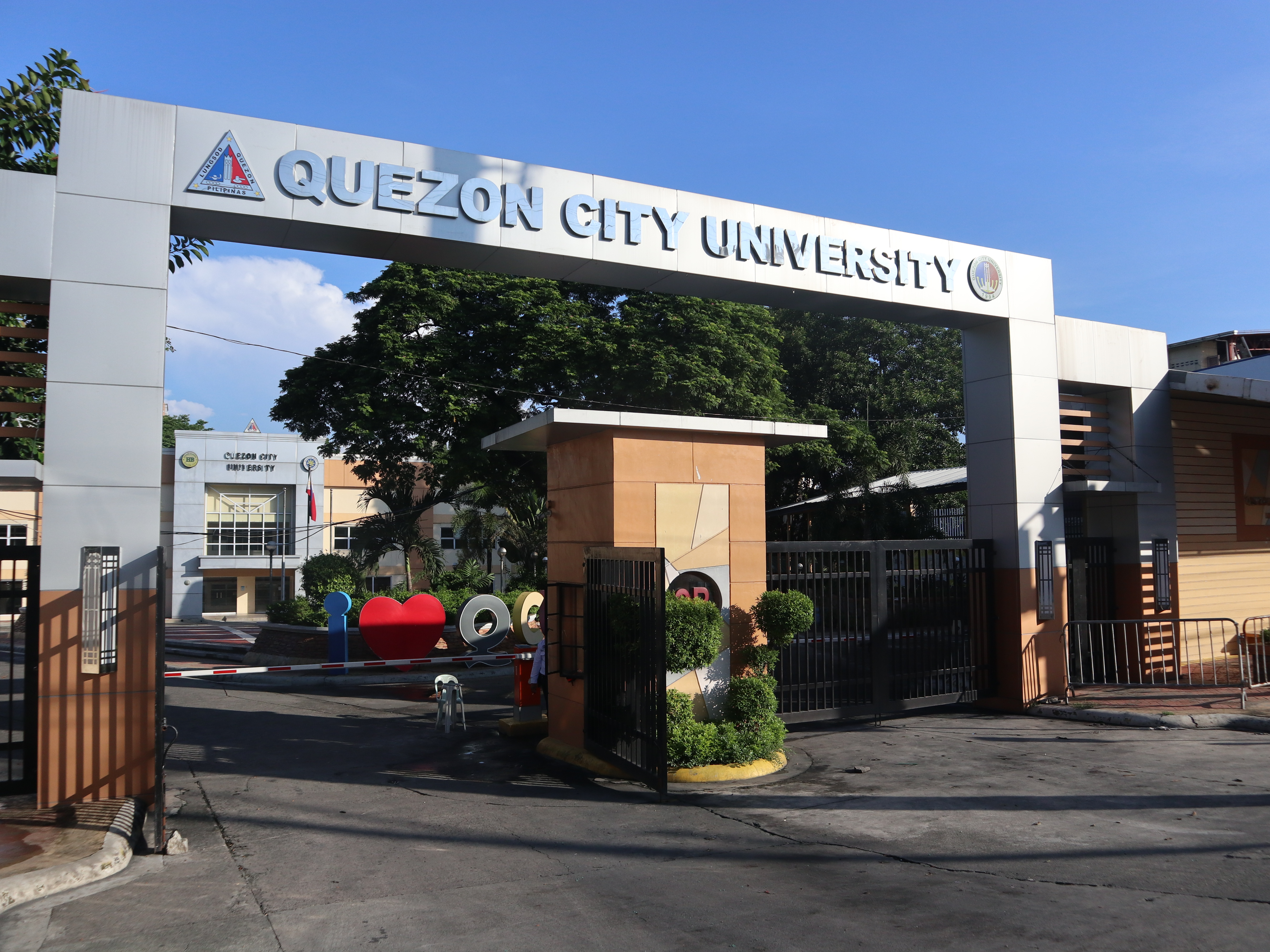
Main campus

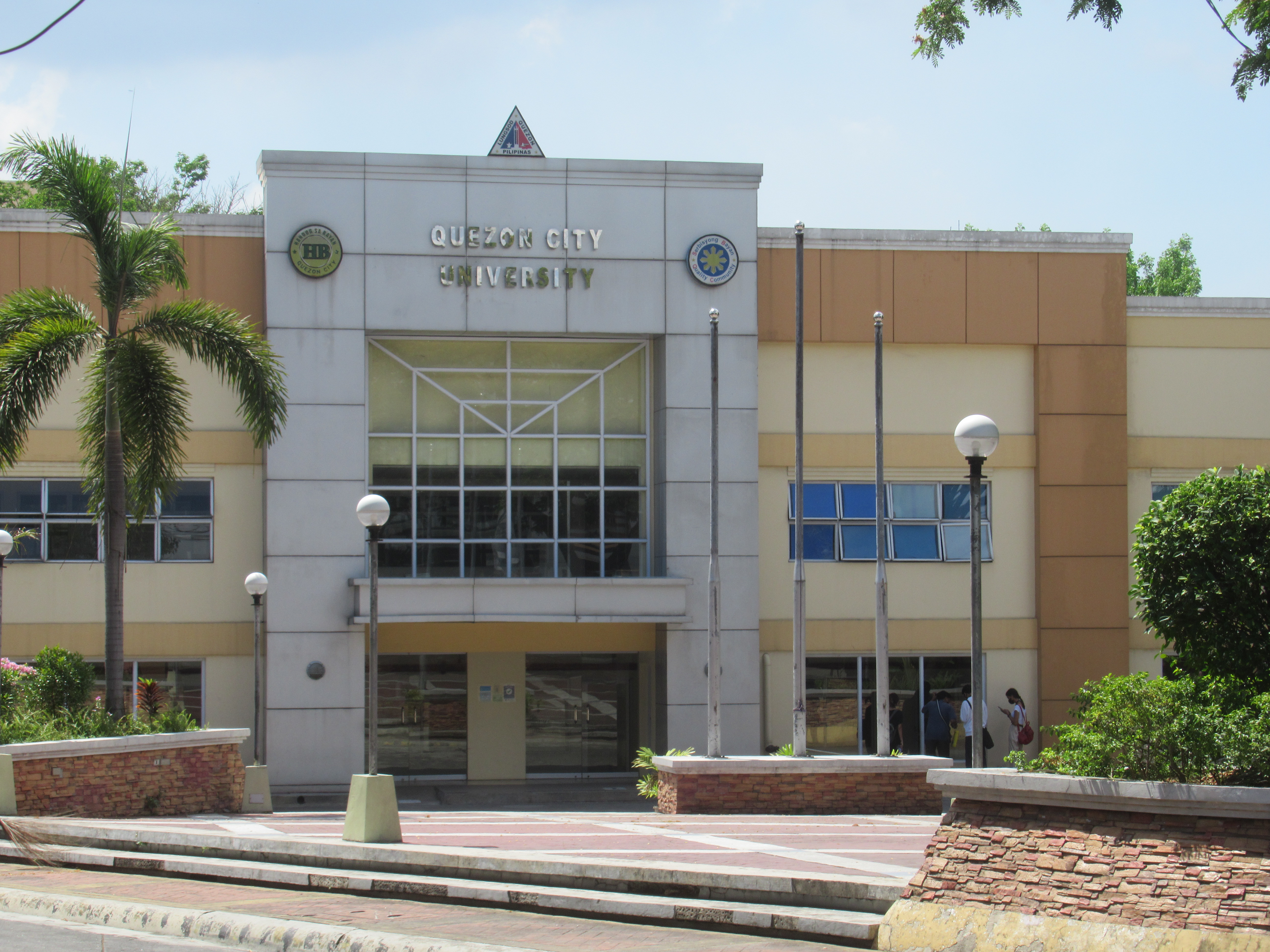
Facade in April 2023

The QCU Main Campus is located along Quirino Highway in Barangay San Bartolome, Novaliches. Its four-hectare campus serves as the home of the Korea-Philippines Information Technology Training Center (KorPhil), whose advanced IT training facilities have also been made available to the university. The university also operates an Enterprise Development Center, from its main campus, designed to connect its entrepreneurship program with the needs of small and medium-scale businesses in the city.

In June 2019, the Quezon City Government inaugurated a new seven-storey-building in QCU that has a 500-seater auditorium and 33 laboratories.

In March 2024, Mayor Joy Belmonte inaugurated another seven-storey-building that contains 6 lecture rooms and 1 multi-purpose room in each floor.

=== San Francisco ===
In 2006, the university opened its first satellite campus located inside the grounds of San Francisco High School in Barangay Sto. Cristo near SM City North EDSA. The campus is connected to the Philippines' first interactive science center, the Quezon City Science Interactive Center.

=== Batasan ===
QCU opened its second satellite campus in 2009 in Quezon City's Batasan Civic Center. The four-storey edifice is along IBP Road, Barangay Batasan Hills, beside Batasan Hills National High School.

== Academics ==
Quezon City University has 8,693 students enrolled across all programs for the 2019–2020 academic year. The university has five colleges:

- College of Accountancy
- College of Business Administration
- College of Computer Studies
- College of Engineering
- College of Education

== See also ==
- Local Universities and Colleges (LUC)
- Association of Local Colleges and Universities (ALCU)
- Alculympics
