= Colegio de Montalban =

Public college in Rizal, Philippines

University of Montalban
- Pamantasan ng Montalban (Filipino)
- The Colegio de Montalban Seal
- Type: Government funded public school
- Established: September 25, 2003
- Location: Montalban, Rizal, Philippines; 14°45′02″N 121°08′30″E
- Campus: Urban
- Hymn: Colegio de Montalban Hymn
- Website: www.pnm.edu.ph

- Location in Luzon Location in the Philippines

Colegio de Montalban (CdM; formerly known as the Pamantasan ng Montalban) is a government-funded university in Kasiglahan Village, Rodriguez, Rizal, Philippines. It was established on September 25, 2003 by virtue of Municipal Ordinance No. 03-24, and approved by the Sangguniang Bayan ng Rodriguez to provide vocational-technical and higher education to help alleviate poverty.

From July 2004 to July 2010, CdM was under the administration of Mayor Pedro S. Cuerpo, who was subsequently succeeded by Mayor Cecilio C. Hernandez since July 2010.

On July 7, 2014, by virtue of Sangguniang Bayan ng Rodriguez Ordinance No. 14-15, Pamantasan ng Montalban was renamed Colegio de Montalban.

== History ==
The Pamantasan ng Montalban was established on September 25, 2003 through Municipal Ordinance No. 03-24 and approved by the Sanguniang Bayan ng Rodriguez.

On July 7, 2014, by virtue of Sangguniang Bayan ng Rodriguez Ordinance No. 14-15, and was later confirmed by the Sangguniang Panlalawigan ng Rizal Resolution No. 193 Series of 2014, Pamantasan ng Montalban was renamed Colegio de Montalban.

At present, Colegio de Montalban continues to work towards the holistic development of its students.

== Scholarship ==
CdM offers free tuition and other school fees under the Universal Access to Quality Tertiary Education Act of 2017 or RA 10931.
