= University of Caloocan City =

Public university in Caloocan, Philippines

- Pamantasan ng Lungsod ng Kalookan (Filipino)
- Former names: Caloocan City Polytechnic College (1975–2004); Caloocan City Community College (1971–1975)
- Type: Public University
- Established: July 1, 1971 (55 years and 45 days)
- Affiliations: ALCU
- Chairman: Hon. Dale Gonzalo R. Malapitan (Mayor of Caloocan)
- President: Atty. Rene Richard Salazar
- Location: Main Campus; Biglang Awa St., Grace Park East, 12th Avenue, Caloocan, Metro Manila, Philippines Congressional Campus; Congressional Road, Brgy. 173, Bagumbong, Caloocan, Metro Manila, Philippines Camarin Business Campus; Tulip St., Camarin, Caloocan, Metro Manila, Philippines; Bagong Silang Campus; Bagong Silang, Caloocan, Metro Manila, Philippines; 14°39′27.5″N 120°58′23.45″E
- Newspaper: The New Crossroads
- Website: ucc-caloocan.edu.ph
- Location in Metro Manila Location in Luzon Location in the Philippines

The University of Caloocan City (abbreviated as UCC) is a public-type local university established in 1971 and formerly called Caloocan City Community College and Caloocan City Polytechnic College. Its south campus is located at Biglang Awa Street, Grace Park East, 12th Avenue, Caloocan, Metro Manila, Philippines (also known as EDSA/Biglang Awa Campus) and the north campuses are Camarin Business Campus, Congressional Campus, and Bagong Silang Campus.

== History ==
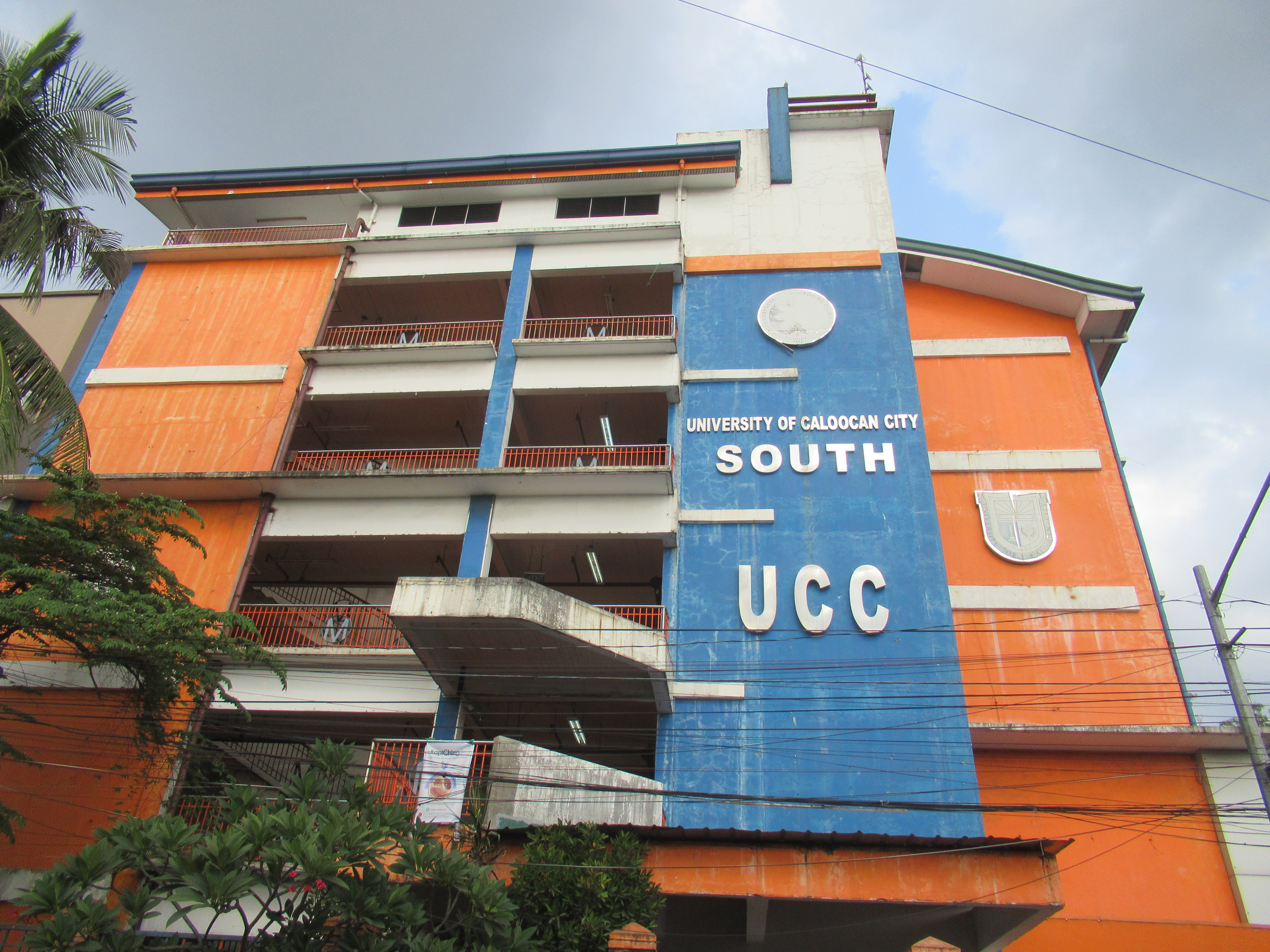
University of Caloocan City – South Campus

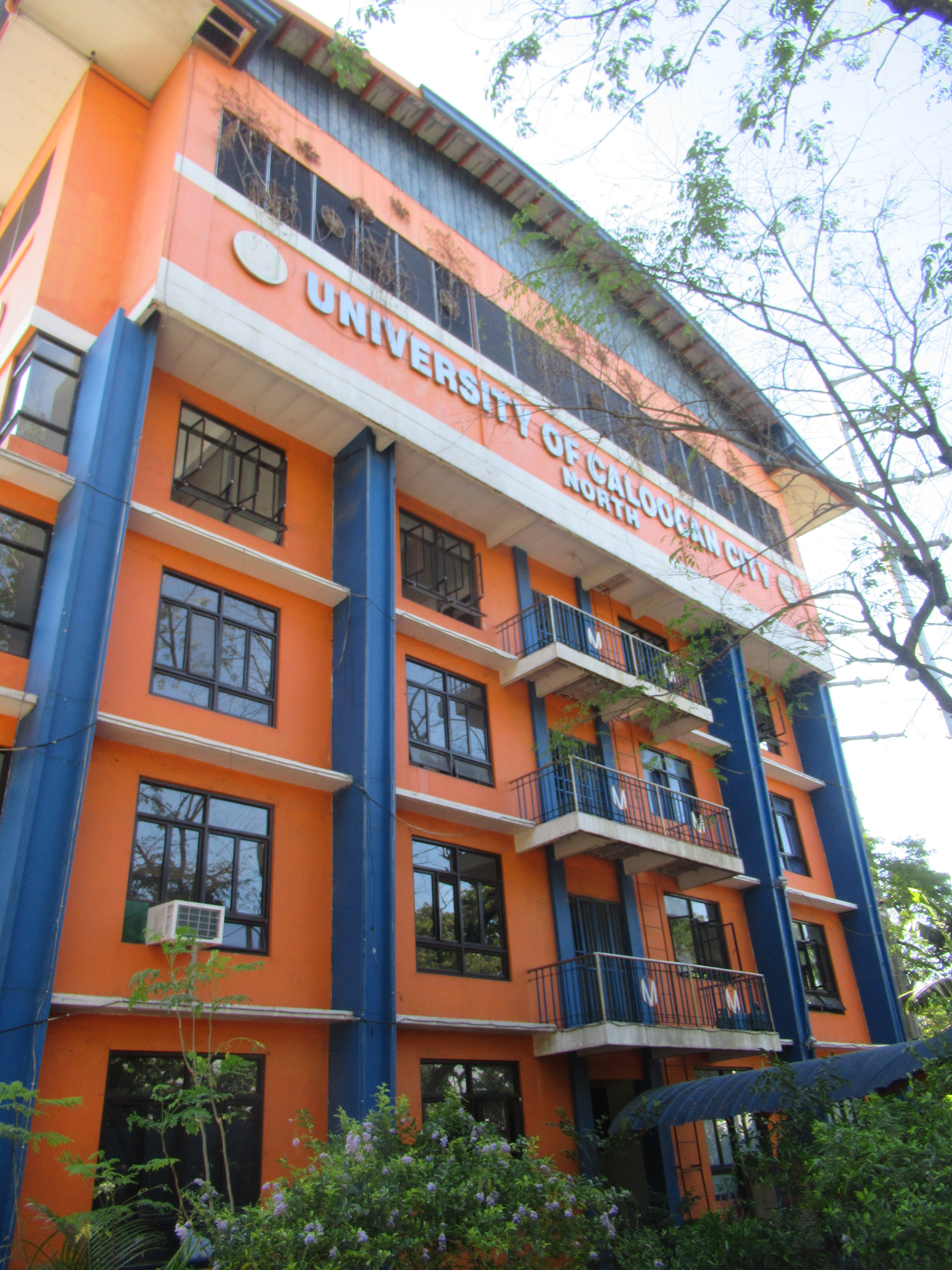
University of Caloocan City – Congressional Campus

The University of Caloocan City was formed in 2004 out of Caloocan City Polytechnic College (CCPC), which started as a two-year course college in 1971 and offered four-year courses in 1975. Its first programs were Bachelor of Science degrees in Industrial Education (BSIE) and Business Technology (BSBT).

The school was first located in a building at Caloocan High School (located at 10th Avenue, Grace Park). It was transferred to its first stand-alone location (at General San. Miguel St. Sangandaan, Caloocan) when the first building burned down.

On January 23, 2004, Caloocan City Council unanimously approved the Ordinance 1020–2003 principally authored by then councilor Gonzalez Jr., which authorized the city government to convert the existing Caloocan City Polytechnic College into a full-fledged university. The initially city hall-funded tertiary educational institution will henceforth be called as University of Caloocan City, the lone public university in Caloocan.

On April 20, 2006, the 32nd Commencement Exercise took place at Folk Arts Theater in Manila. The BSIE graduates were the first to be called on stage, which is a tradition at the Commencement Exercises.

At the start of academic year 2015, 1st District Councilor Dale Gonzalo "Along" Malapitan made an ordinance that the tuition fee in the university will be free for all freshmen and transferees who graduated from elementary and high school in Caloocan, as long as they are children of, or they are themselves, registered voters of Caloocan.

The university also offered the Senior High School program for Junior High School completers for the School year 2016–2017, in line with the recent implementation for the K-12 program. ABM (Accountancy, Business, and Management), & HUMSS (Humanities and Social Sciences) strands were available in the University for the Senior High School program. But the SHS program was closed in the university in the succeeding year, resulting to have only a single batch of SHS graduates in UCC.

== Courses offered ==
The university offers Bachelor/Undergraduate courses, associate courses, and graduate courses.

=== Bachelor/Undergraduate Programs ===
==== College of Liberal Arts and Sciences (CLAS) ====
- Bachelor of Science in Mathematics (BSMath)
- Bachelor of Science in Psychology (BSPsych)
- Bachelor of Science in Computer Science (BSCS/BSComSci)
- Bachelor of Science in Information System (BSIS)
- Bachelor of Science in Information Technology (BSIT)
- Bachelor of Science in Entertainment and Multimedia Computing (BSEMC)
- Bachelor of Arts in Political Science (ABPS/ABPolSci)
- Bachelor of Arts in Communication (ABComm)
- Bachelor of Arts in Behavioral Science, Major in:
  - Organizational and Social Systems Development (ABBS-OSSD)
- Bachelor in Public Administration (BPA)
  - Special Program for Elected Officials & Government Employees (BPA-Special)

==== College of Business and Accountancy (CBA) ====
- Bachelor of Science in Business Administration, Major in:
  - Financial Management (BSBA-FMGT)
  - Marketing Management (BSBA-MKMGT)
  - Entrepreneurial Management (BSBA-EM)
- Bachelor of Science in Accountancy (BSA)
- Bachelor of Science in Accounting Information System (BSAIS)
- Bachelor of Science in Office Administration (BSOAd)
- Bachelor of Science in Computer Secretarial (BSComSec)
- Bachelor of Science in Tourism (BST)
- Bachelor of Science in Hotel and Restaurant Management (BSHRM)

==== College of Education (COE) ====
- Bachelor in Elementary Education, Major in:
  - Early Childhood (BEEd-ECEd)
  - Special Education (BEEd-SpEd)
- Bachelor in Secondary Education, Major in:
  - Science (BSEd-Sci)
  - English (BSEd-Eng)
  - English-Chinese (BSEd-EngChi)
  - Technology and Livelihood Education (BSEd-TLE)

==== College of Criminal Justice Education (CCJE) ====
- Bachelor of Science in Criminology (BSCrim)

=== Associate Courses ===
- Associate in Office Administration/ Computer Secretarial
- Associate in Accounting Technology
- Certificate in Community Mental Health
- Associate in Hotel & Restaurant Services
- Associate in Entertainment and Multimedia Computing
- Associate in Security Services
- Associate in Entrepreneurial Management

=== Graduate school ===
- Doctor of Philosophy Major in Educational Management (PhD-EM)
- Doctor in Public Administration (DPA)
- Master in Public Administration (MPA)
- Master in Business Administration (MBA)
- Master of Arts in Education, Major in Educational Management (MAED-EM)
- Master of Arts in Teaching Science (MATS)
- Master of Arts in Teaching in the Early Grades (MATG)
- Master of Science in Criminal Justice, Major in Criminology (MSCJ)
- Certificate in Professional Education
  - Elementary (CPE-Elem)
  - Secondary (CPE-Sec)
- Certificate in Physical Education (CPEd)

=== College of Law ===
- Juris Doctor (J.D.)

=== Senior High School (closed) ===
The University also offered Senior High School programs for Junior High School completers, but it was only opened for batches 2016–2018.

==== Strands ====
- ABM
- HUMSS (Humanities & Social Sciences)

== Student organizations ==
The university-wide student organization of the university is the Supreme Student Council or the SSC, which has a president and executive officers for north and south campuses, while the university's electoral commission is the University Student Electoral Tribunal or the USET, which is mandated to handle the election proper and other related activities for the election of SSC officers and other student organizations. The official publication of the university is The New Crossroads or TNC, which also has an editorial board/executives. Other student organizations are classified as: institutional-based, which is the SSC; collegiate-based, which are the councils for the different colleges under undergraduate courses; and interest-based, which are the organizations, clubs, and councils formed by different courses and departments of the university.
