= Pamantasan ng Lungsod ng Pasig =

Public university in Pasig, Philippines

- Other name: University of Pasig City
- Motto: Community-oriented University Education
- Type: Public university
- Established: March 15, 1999; 27 years ago
- Chairman: Hon. Mayor Victor Ma. Regis N. Sotto
- President: Dr. Glicerio M. Maningas
- Location: Pasig, Metro Manila, Philippines; 14°33′43″N 121°04′29″E
- Colors: Yellow and green
- Website: www.plpasig.edu.ph
- Location in Metro Manila Location in Luzon Location in the Philippines

The Pamantasan ng Lungsod ng Pasig (PLP) is a local university run by the Pasig city government in the Philippines.

== History ==
On March 15, 1999, the Sangguniang Panlungsod ng Pasig passed the Ordinance No. 11, series of 1999, which established the Pamantasan ng Lungsod ng Pasig. The school was then conceived by former Mayor Vicente Eusebio, with the approval and subsequent implementation of the Republic Act No. 7160 (Local Government Code).
