= Local colleges and universities (Philippines) =

Local colleges and universities (LCUs) are higher educational institutions that are being run by local government units in the Philippines.

A local government unit (LGU) maybe a barangay, a municipality, city, or a province that puts up a post-secondary institution based on Section 447(a)(5)(x) (Municipality), 458(a)(5)(x) (City), and 468(a)(4)(iii) (Province) of the Local Government Code of 1991, which provide that

"subject to availability of funds and to existing laws, rules and regulations the" LGU "shall establish and provide for the operation of vocational and technological schools and similar post-secondary institutions and, with approval of the Department of Education, fix and collect reasonable fees and other school charges at said institutions, subject to existing laws on tuition fees."

With this law, a large portion of the functions of the national government such as public works, social welfare, health services, and education was transferred to the local government.

LCUs operate on the premise that the territorial boundary of the LGU, with all the education infrastructure and facilities built by the province, city, or municipality, is the university campus itself. It means that an LCU has free access to all the structures found in the LGU, including its library, sports complex, hospitals, business establishments, and barangay centers.

== History ==
The forerunner of local colleges and universities or LCUs are the community schools which usually function as elementary or secondary schools at daytime and, toward the end of the day, convert into a community college. This type of educational institution were limited to the old Department of Education, Culture and Sports (DECS) infrastructure, while LCUs are of recent origin.

In 1965, the Pamantasan ng Lungsod ng Maynila, the first institution of higher learning in the Philippines to be fully subsidized by a local government unit, was established through the Republic Act 4196, which authorizes the City of Manila to operate its own university. For more than two decades, the PLM was the only local university in the country until the creation of other local universities and colleges through the enactment and implementation of the Republic Act 7160, also known as the "Local Government Code of 1991," and the Republic Act 7796, or the Technical Education and Skills Development Act of 1994.

With an increased share of taxes from 11% to 40% given by the national government units plus their own income as highly urbanized cities or municipalities, a good number of LGUs decided to put up their own LCUs. LGUs are aware that while it is easy even for poor families to send their children to elementary and high school because costs are relatively lower, sending them to college poses a big problem. It is in this light that local government units are inspired to establish and maintain institutions of higher learning (HEIs) in their own localities.

Through an LCU, high school graduates from poor families can earn a three- to six-month course certificate, two-year associate degree, or a four-year Baccalaureate degree paying only minimal, if any, tuition fee. This is exemplified by the Pamantasan ng Lungsod ng Maynila, Pamantasan ng Lungsod ng Pasig, and the University of Makati, which have graduated deserving students from low-income families.

== Naming ==
To create a standard and distinction between a "community college" and a "local college and university" and to have better planning purposes and more fair distribution of technical and financial assistance by the national government, the Association of Local Colleges and Universities, and the director and staff of the Commission on Higher Education (CHED) Office of Programs and Standards visited all the "community colleges" that were included in the CHED statistics.

== See also ==
- Association of Local Colleges and Universities
- Category:Public universities
- State university system
- National university
