= List of private schools in Bacolod =

This is a list of private schools in Bacolod, Negros Occidental, Philippines.

== A ==
- ABE International Business College – Bacolod Campus
- AMA Computer College – Bacolod Campus

== B ==
- Bacolod Christian College of Negros
- Bacolod Tay Tung High School
- Bacolod Trinity Christian School

== C ==
- Castleson High
- Colegio San Agustin – Bacolod
- College of Arts & Sciences of Asia & the Pacific – Bacolod Campus

== J ==
- Jack and Jill School
- John B. Lacson Colleges Foundation – Bacolod

== L ==
- La Consolacion College Bacolod
- Living Stones International School

== M ==
- Mapúa Malayan Digital College – Learning Hub Bacolod
- Maranatha Christian College - High School

== N ==
- National University Bacolod

== O ==
- Our Lady of Mercy College – Bacolod

== R ==
- Riverside College (Philippines)

== S ==
- STI West Negros University
- St. Joseph School – La Salle
- St. Benilde School
- St. Scholastica's Academy – Bacolod
- St. John's Institute (Hua Ming)
- Scola Guadalupana

== U ==
- University of Negros Occidental – Recoletos
- University of Saint La Salle

== V ==
- VMA Global College
