= University of Makati =

Public university in Taguig, Philippines

- Unibersidad ng Makati; Pamantasan ng Makati (Filipino)
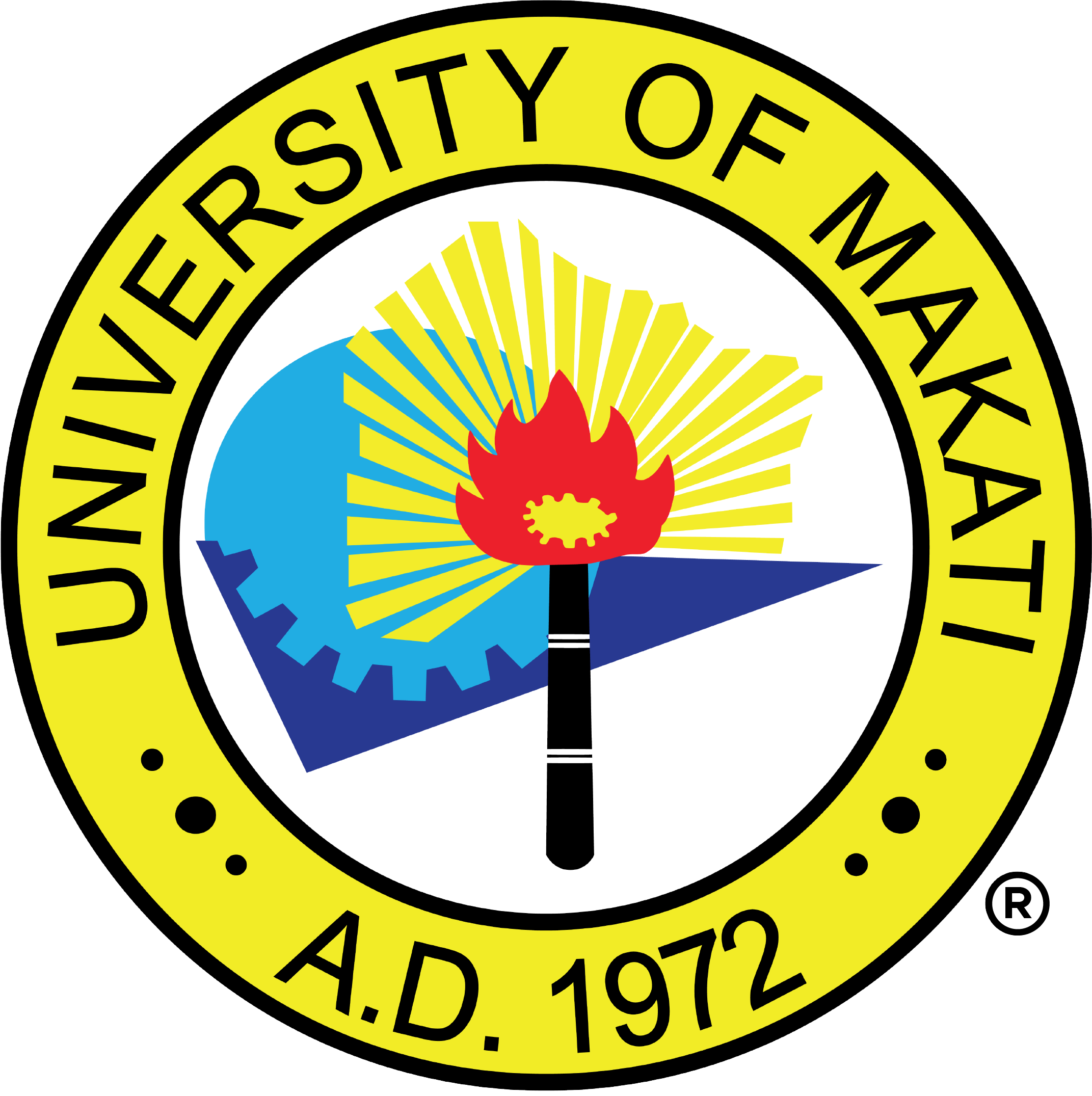
- Former names: Makati Polytechnic Community College (1972–1987); Makati College (1987–1991); Pamantasan ng Makati (1991–2002)
- Motto: Aim High, UMak
- Ownership and management: Makati City Government (de facto) (Note: School managed by the City of Makati, geographically located in Taguig since 2023 which also claims ownership.) Taguig City Government (de jure) claimed ownership
- Type: Public LGU funded higher education institution
- Established: 1972; 54 years ago
- Academic affiliations: ALCU, UCSAA, NAASCU
- Chairperson: Nancy Binay
- Chancellor: Atty. Nestor M. Leynes III
- President: Elyxzur C. Ramos
- Vice-president: List: Prof. Ederson Delos Trino Tápia (VP for Academic Affairs); Maria Fay Nenette Maximo-Cariaga (VP for Planning & Research); Atty. Jewel D. Bulos (VP for Administration); Engr. Luke Ivan B. Moro (VP for Finance); Prof. Virgilio B. Tabbu (VP for Student Services & Community Development)
- Students: 12,500
- Location: J. P. Rizal Avenue Extension, West Rembo, Taguig, Philippines; 14°33′46″N 121°03′22″E
- Hymn: UMak Hymn
- Colors: Royal blue and Yellow
- Nickname: Hardy Herons
- Mascot: Heron
- Website: www.umak.edu.ph

- Location in Metro Manila Location in Luzon Location in the Philippines

The University of Makati (Filipino: Unibersidad ng Makati or Pamantasan ng Makati), commonly referred to as UMak (Tagalog pronunciation: [ˈjumak]), is a public, local city university located in West Rembo, Taguig, Metro Manila, Philippines. It operates under the tutelage of the City Government of Makati as its parent organization.

The university was founded in 1972 by the Makati municipal government as the Makati Polytechnic Community College by virtue of Municipal Resolution No. 242 Ordinance No. 64. Subsequently, Executive Order No. 03-87 series of 1987 was passed renaming the same to Makati College. In 1991, Fort Andres Bonifacio College was ceded to then municipal government of Makati which merged with Makati College. Resolution No. 242 changed the name of the college to Pamantasan ng Makati (PnM) and paved the way for the college to be elevated as a chartered university fully owned by the local government. Subsequently, City Ordinance No. 99-126 was enacted in 1999 strengthening the organization. And in 2002, City Ordinance No. 2002-111 was passed by the City Council of Makati which amended previous resolutions and changed the name of the Pamantasan ng Lungsod ng Makati to University of Makati which we know today. UMak continues to serve the less privileged citizens of the country to have access to quality, better, and affordable higher education.

== History ==
The University of Makati was founded in 1972 as the Makati Polytechnic Community College, also known as MPCC, through Municipal Resolution No. 242 Ordinance No. 64. MPCC offered technical and vocational programs in industrial and business technology. In 1987, MPCC was renamed Makati College.

The Philippine Army turned over the Fort Andres Bonifacio College to the then Municipal Government of Makati and merged with Makati College in 1990. In 1991, Makati College was renamed Pamantasan ng Makati by virtue of Municipal Order No. 433. To be more globally recognized, Pamantasan ng Makati changed its name to University of Makati or UMak in 2002 through City Ordinance 2002–111, paving the way for education innovation in the City of Makati.

By virtue of Municipal Ordinance No. 433, the Pamantasan ng Makati became a chartered university on December 19, 1991, under the administration of Jejomar Binay. On August 27, 2002, City Ordinance 2002-111 was approved, amending City Ordinance No. 99-126, revising the Pamantasan ng Makati Charter to change the official name of Pamantasan ng Makati to University of Makati. In 2023, University of Makati receives recognition as Higher Education Institution from Commission on Higher Education (Philippines).

=== Makati–Taguig territorial dispute ===
It is currently administered and operated by Makati, however, the ownership of its land and buildings are currently disputed between the cities of Makati and Taguig following the resolution of the Makati–Taguig territorial dispute, which was decided in favor of Taguig. The Supreme Court of the Philippines ruled that Makati should stop exercising jurisdiction over West Rembo, where the university is located, effectively placing it in Taguig. Despite the ruling, operations of the university are still under the Makati city government, as affirmed by the University President of UMak in August 2023.

The 14 public elementary and high schools in the Embo barangays were handed over from Schools Division Office of Makati to the Schools Division Office of Taguig City and Pateros starting January 1, 2024. Makati Mayor Abby Binay appealed to the Department of Education (DepEd) that the city can keep the Makati Science High School, Fort Bonifacio Elementary School, and Fort Bonifacio High School, the latter two of which are contiguous properties with the university. The Fort Bonifacio Elementary and High Schools are planned to be integrated with UMak as its laboratory schools. However, Makati's request was denied by DepEd, stating that it lacks in legal basis and justification. DepEd Undersecretary Revsee Escobedo cited that granting the request would violate the Supreme Court ruling, the Constitution, and the Basic Education Act of 2001, which mandates that basic education governance is a responsibility of the national government.

== Buildings and facilities ==
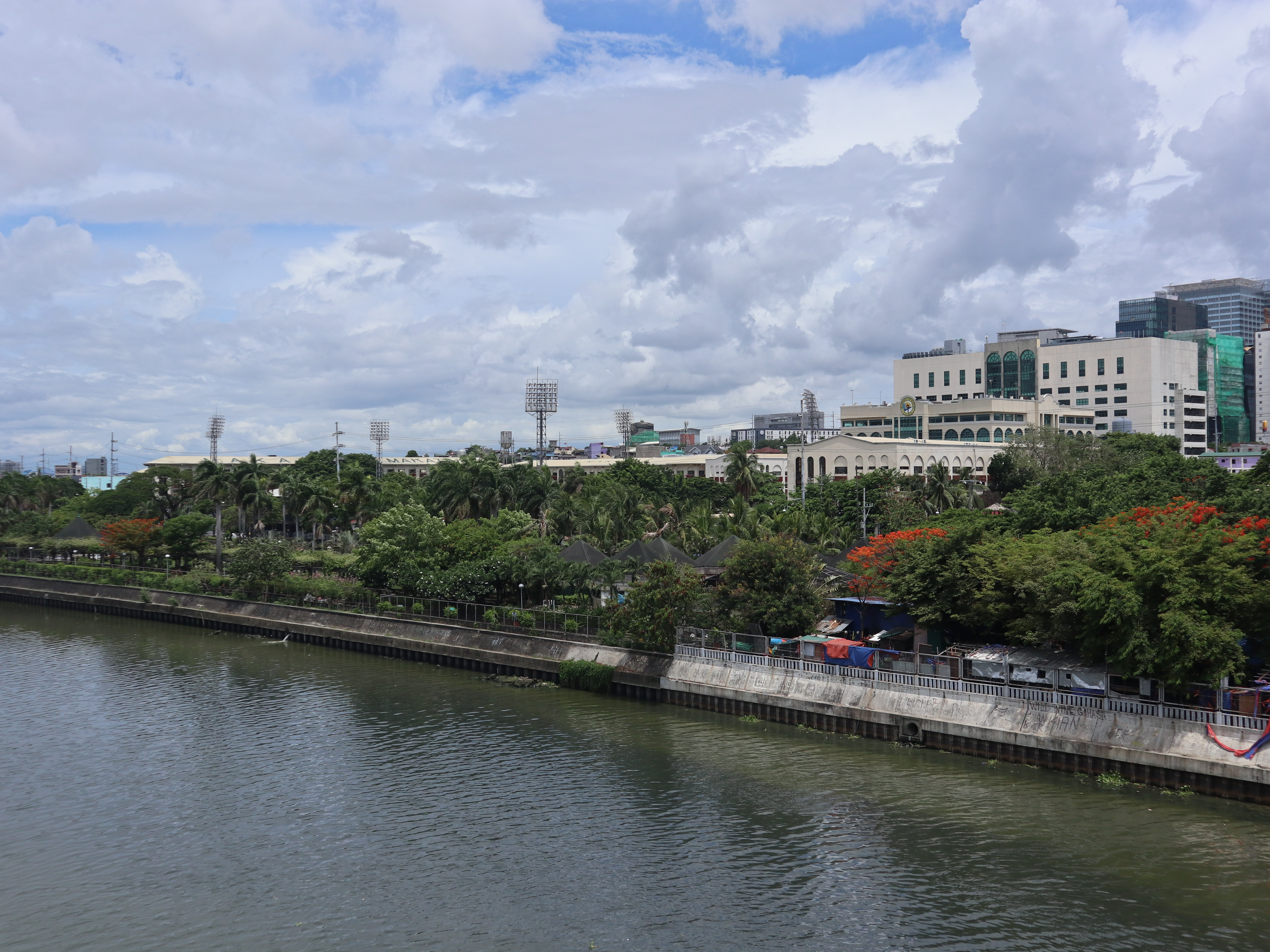
View of the campus from the Santa Monica–Lawton Bridge

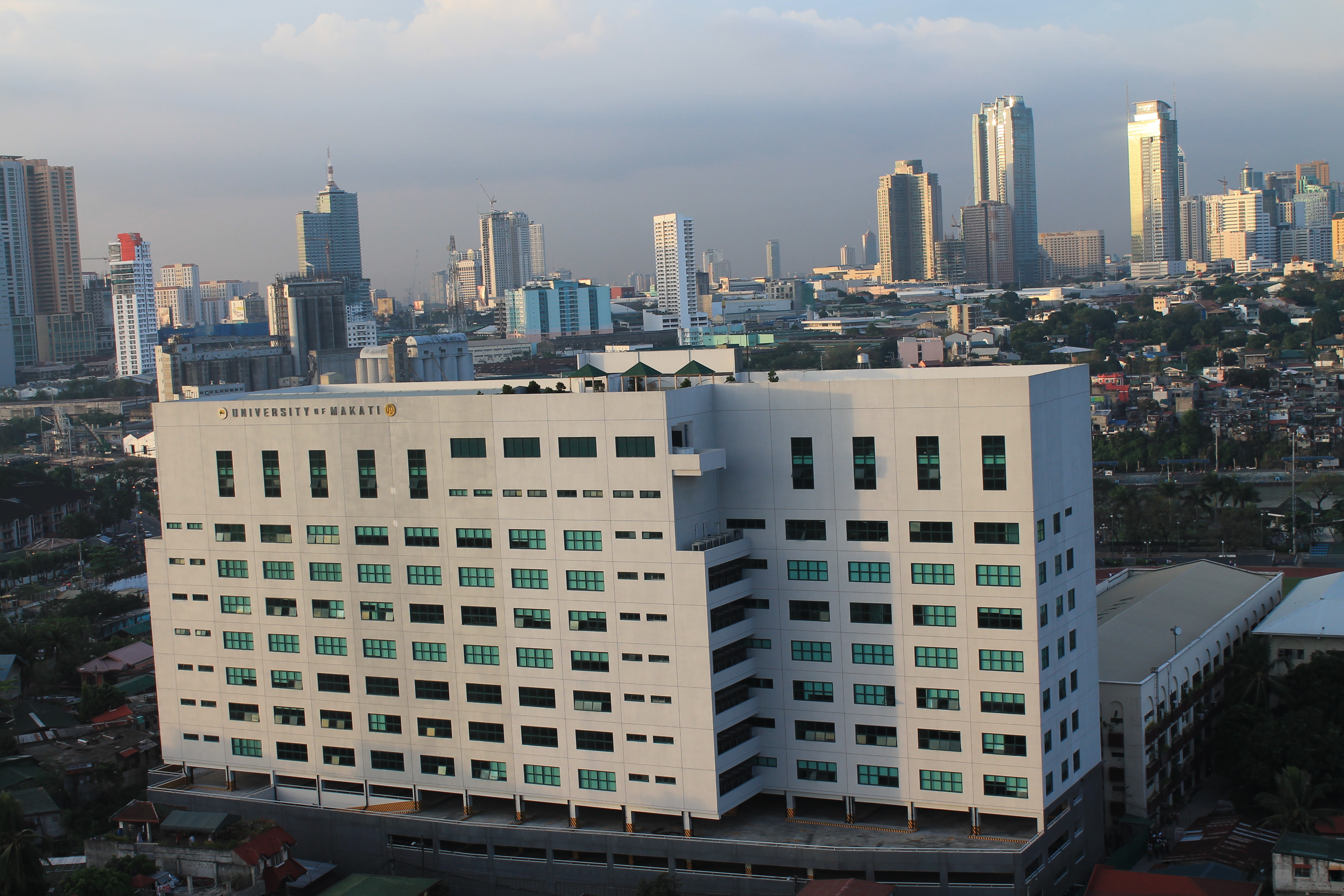
University of Makati's Health and Physical Science Building view from Kalayaan Avenue

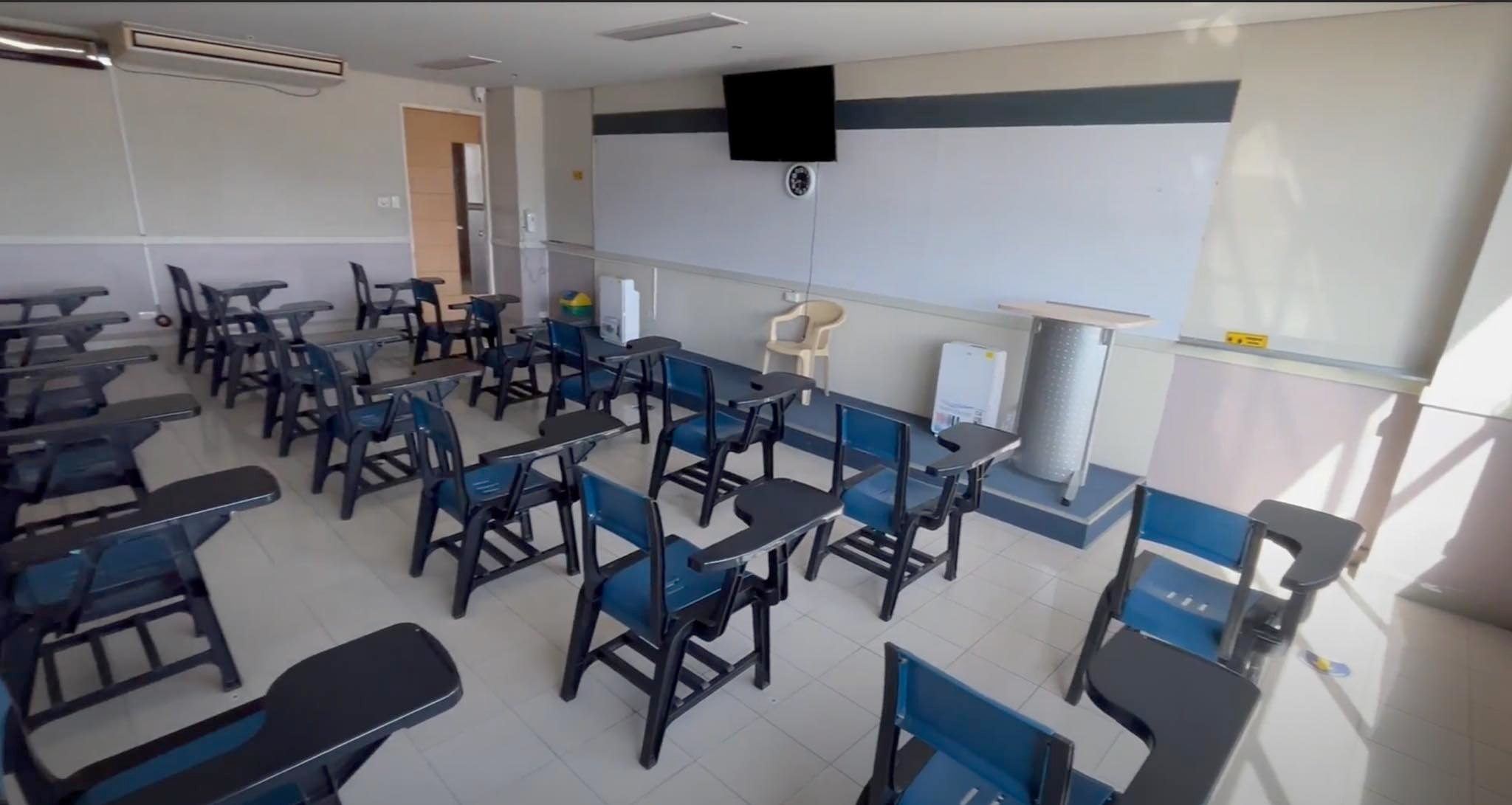
A typical classroom called "Lecture Room" on 10th Floor, HPSB Building during limited face-to-face classes

The university is located at J.P. Rizal Extension, West Rembo, Taguig, in front of the Taguig People's Park and the Pasig River. It also near the former Makati Aqua Sports Arena which was formerly utilized by the university for students taking swimming-related subjects.

Prof. Diosdado J. Macapagal, a professor from College of Technology Management proposed the scale model of Pamantasan ng Makati based on original blueprint plan of Makati Engineering Office. The scale model was commissioned by then Makati College President Dr. Anita Bustillo to be given as a birthday gift to then - Mayor Jejomar C. Binay on November 11, 1992.

UMak facilities include academic buildings 1, 2, and 3, administrative building, Health and Physical Science Building (HPSB), and Stadium.

== Academics ==
UMak was one of the first universities in the Philippines to pilot the Senior High School Modelling Program of the Department of Education, in 2012. In April 2022, the School of Law's nine pioneering batch from its graduating class achieve 100% Philippine Bar Examination passing rate.

=== Senior High School ===
- Higher School ng UMak (HSU) (A University of Makati Laboratory School. Part of College of Innovative Teacher Education)

=== Institutes ===
- Institute of Pharmacy (IOP)
- Institute of Nursing (ION)
- Institute of Imaging and Health Sciences (IIHS)
- Institute of Accountancy (IOA)
- Institute of Technical Education and Skills Training (ITEST) (formerly Makati Technical and Placement Consortia (MTPLC))
- Institute of Social Development and Nation Building (ISDNB)
- Institute of Arts and Design (IAD) (formerly College of Arts and Letters (CAL), College of Broadcasting and Digital Arts (CBDA), College of Performing and Digital Arts (CEPDA))
- Institute of Psychology (IOPsy) (formerly College of Science (COS), College of Science and Education (CASE))
- Institute of Disaster and Emergency Management (IDEM)

=== Colleges ===
- College of Liberal Arts and Sciences (formerly part of College of Sciences (COS) and a merger of College of Arts and Letters (CAL))
- College of Business and Financial Science (CBFS) (formerly College of Business Administration)
- College of Computing and Information Sciences (CCIS) (formerly College of Computer Science)
- College of Continuing, Advanced and Professional Studies (CCAPS) (formerly School of Continuing Professional Education / College of Work-based Learning)
- College of Innovative Teacher Education (CITE) (formerly College of Education)
- College of Construction Sciences and Engineering (CCSE)
- College of Engineering Technology (CET) (Formerly College of Technology Management)
- College of Governance and Public Policy (CGPP)
- College of Maritime Leadership Innovation (CMLI) (Now Defunct)
- College of Tourism and Hospitality Management (CTHM)
- Center of Human Kinesthetics (CHK)
- School of Law (SOL)

== University rankings ==
- University of Makati got 101-200 spot on World University Rankings for Innovation (WURI) 2023
- University of Makati placed 209th on World University Rankings for Innovation (WURI) 2024
- University of Makati's Website "umak.edu.ph" placed 151st spot out of 664 university websites ranked by Webometrics Ranking Web of Universities publish by the Cybermetrics Lab, a research group of the Spanish National Research Council - July 2024
- University of Makati ranked 186th on World University Rankings for Innovation (WURI) 2025
- University of Makati recognized by Times Higher Education 2025 Impact Rankings based on its progress towards the United Nations’ Sustainable Development Goals.
- University of Makati's Website "umak.edu.ph" placed 138th spot out of 356 university websites ranked by Webometrics Ranking Web of Universities publish by the Cybermetrics Lab January 2026.
- University of Makati ranked 139th on World University Rankings for Innovation (WURI) 2026

== Notable alumni ==
=== Governance ===
- Manny Pacquiao — Eight-division World Boxing Champion, former senator and House of Representatives member for Sarangani. Finished Bachelor of Arts in political science, major in local government administration (Executive Program, 2020).
- Arnell Ignacio — Overseas Workers Welfare Administration Executive Director, host, and actor. Finished Bachelor of Arts in Political Science, major in Local Government Administration (2019).
- Jonathan Jalbuna — Director, Presidential Communications Group, Philippines. Former president, Press Photographer of the Philippines. Former director, Presidential Photographer Association of Malacañang Palace.
- Ejay Falcon — Vice Governor of Oriental Mindoro, former actor. Finished Bachelor of Arts in political science, major in local government administration (Executive Program, 2024).

=== Education ===
- Marita Canapi — Commissioner, Commission on Higher Education. Former president, University of Rizal System, and former vice president for academic affairs, University of Makati and Pamantasan ng Lungsod ng Marikina. Finished Doctor of Education, major in educational management (2001)
- Lee Boy Villas — Exceptional Individual in the Field of Business and Education, Asia’s Modern Hero Awards 2023. Finished Bachelor in Secondary Education Major in Social Studies (2006).

=== Entertainment ===
- Khimo Gumatay — Singer songwriter and Idol Philippines season 2 winner. Bachelor of Arts in Political Science, major in Local Government Administration (2023).
- Donita Nose — Host, comedianne, vlogger, singer, and actress. Finished Bachelor in Secondary Education Major in English (2001).

=== Sports ===
- Jeniellyn Lou Saldo — Body builder. 2017 Fitness Universe Champion. Finished Bachelor in Physical Wellness (2018), Associate in Multimedia Technology (2013).
- Editha Boticario - The 1st female referee of the Philippine Basketball Association. Technical Supervisor, ASEAN Basketball League and University Athletic Association of the Philippines. Trailblazer Awardee, Philippine Professional Sports Summit Awards. Finished Bachelor in Physical Wellness (2012).
- Paul Marton Dela Cruz — The first Filipino to win a medal in the Archery Event of the Asian Games. SEA Games, Asia Cup Leg, Asian Archery Championships, World Archery Championships, and Asia Cup Stage World Ranking Event Gold Medalist. Finished Bachelor in Physical Wellness (2014).
- Rachel Cabral — Olympic archer. Represented the Philippines in Archery at the 2012 Summer Olympics. Finished Bachelor in Physical Wellness program in 2011.
- Jemyca Aribado — A professional Squash player and ranked 83 on Official Women's Squash World Ranking as of February 2018. Finished Physical wellness major in Sport management in 2016.

== See also ==
- Local college and university (Philippines)
- Association of Local Colleges and Universities
- Pamantasan
- Alculympics
- Davao Aguilas F.C.
