= Benilde =

Benilde may refer to:

- Saint Bénilde Romançon

Three educational institutions named after this man:

- St. Benilde School
- Benilde-St. Margaret's School
- De La Salle–College of Saint Benilde
