= List of colleges and universities in Bacolod =

This is a list of colleges and universities in Bacolod, Philippines.

== Universities ==
=== State universities ===
- Carlos Hilado Memorial State University
- State University of Northern Negros

=== Private non-sectarian universities ===
- National University Bacolod
- STI West Negros University

=== Private Catholic universities ===
- University of Negros Occidental – Recoletos
- University of Saint La Salle

== Colleges ==
=== Local colleges ===
- Bacolod City College
- Negros Occidental Language and Information Technology Center (NOLITC)

=== Private Catholic colleges ===
- Colegio San Agustin – Bacolod
- La Consolacion College Bacolod

=== Private national colleges ===
- ABE International Business College – Bacolod Campus
- AMA Computer College – Bacolod Campus
- College of Arts & Sciences of Asia & the Pacific – Bacolod Campus
- Mapúa Malayan Digital College – Learning Hub Bacolod

=== Other private colleges ===
- Asian College of Aeronautics – Bacolod Branch (Main Campus)
- Bacolod Christian College of Negros
- John B. Lacson Colleges Foundation – Bacolod
- LaSalTech
- Our Lady of Mercy College – Bacolod
- Riverside College, Inc.
- VMA Global College
- Victory Business College
