= Pedro Orata =

Filipino educator (1899–1989)

Pedro T. Orata
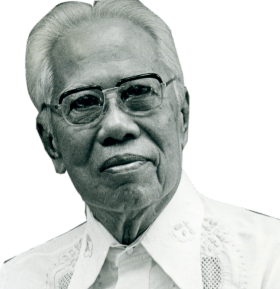
- Born: 27 February 1899; Urdaneta, Pangasinan, Philippine Islands, First Republic of the Philippines
- Died: 13 July 1989 (aged 90)
- Education: University of Illinois; Ohio State University
- Occupation: Educator
- Known for: Barrio High Schools

Pedro Tamesis Orata (27 February 1899 – 13 July 1989) was a Filipino educator known as the Father of Barrio High Schools. He is also the founder of the Urdaneta Community College (now Urdaneta City University), the country's first community college, and a recipient of the Ramon Magsaysay Award in 1971.

== Early life and education ==
Orata was born on February 27, 1899, in Barrio Bactad, Urdaneta, Pangasinan to Candido Orata and Numeriana Tamesis.

In 1920, he finished his high school studies in Lingayen as the class valedictorian and, through his sister Victoriana's savings, went to the United States to pursue higher education. He supported his studies by working on a railroad gang, washing dishes, and through a partial pensionado support from the Philippine Government. He finished the bachelor's degree in education at the University of Illinois and the master's and doctor's degrees at the Ohio State University.

== Career ==
After obtaining his doctor's degree in 1927, he returned to the Philippines and joined the Bureau of Public Schools. He was first assigned at Bayambang Normal School (now a campus of Pangasinan State University) but was sent to the Philippine Normal School (now Philippine Normal University) in Manila. He was also appointed as Division Superintendent of schools in Isabela in 1928 and in Sorsogon in 1931.

He returned to the United States in 1934 and taught at his alma mater, Ohio State University, until 1936. In 1937, he was appointed as principal of a school for Sioux native Americans at the Pine Ridge Indian Reservation in South Dakota where he developed his ideas of a community school. He submitted a detailed report and his ideas to the National Office of Education of Education in Washington D.C. (now the Department of Education and was appointed as a supervisor for Home Economics and later Specialist in Guidance and Vocational Information. In 1941, he returned to the Philippines and served the Philippine National Council of Education. After a year of government service during World War II, he went back to Pangasinan.

After the liberation of the Philippines in 1945, Orata was appointed as "Director of Education" in Urdaneta with the task of reopening the schools. He gathered doctors, lawyers, engineers, pharmacists, and other professionals to establish a school in a roofless church divided into four sections by lines drawn on the floor. It became known as the Pangasinan East Provincial High School (now Urdaneta City National High School), the first public high school in the Philippines outside a provincial capital.

In 1948, Orata was appointed as a staff member of the UNESCO in Paris and in 1960 was designated as the first Dean of the Graduate School and then director of curriculum development at the Philippine Normal College. He retired in 1964.

== Later life and legacy ==
After his retirement, Orata organized barrio high schools and community colleges. From the start of four schools, 16 more schools were established in Pangasinan, Camarines Norte, and Albay after tests revealed that barrio high school students performed better than their regular high school counterparts. It ushered in a national program for barrio high schools which received support from national and international agencies. In 1969, Republic Act No. 6054 or the Barrio High School Charter was enacted. The barrio high school program reached 43 provinces and six cities.

He also founded the Urdaneta Community College (now Urdaneta City University) in 1966 with the support of the municipal government using the proceeds from the town's fiesta celebration. The school was patterned after the community colleges of the United States and offered a two-year general education course as well as short-term courses in agriculture and retail business for adults. It started with an enrollment of 144 students who came from rural areas.

== Awards and recognition ==
In 1971, Orata received the Ramon Magsaysay Award for Public Service in recognition of his "44 years of creative work in education, particularly his conception and promotion of barrio high schools for rural Filipino youth."

Barangay Bactad Proper and Bactad Proper National High School, in Urdaneta City, Pangasinan, were renamed Barangay Dr. Pedro T. Orata and Pedro T. Orata National High School respectively.
