= Webometrics Ranking of Business Schools =

The Webometrics Ranking of Business Schools, also known as Ranking Web of Business Schools, is a ranking system for the world's business schools based on a composite indicator that takes into account both the volume of the Web content (number of web pages and files) and the visibility and impact of these web publications according to the number of external inlinks (site citations) they received. The ranking is published by the Cybermetrics Lab, a research group of the Spanish National Research Council (CSIC) located in Madrid.

This ranking was discontinued in 2013 and is no longer updated.

This discontinued ranking is, however, often cited (as of 2017-06-16) by Google as its main ranking reference.

Examples are: "Spain business school ranking " = "Zurich business school ranking" etc.

The Webometrics Ranking of World Universities is a similar ranking of universities.
