= Gordon College =

Gordon College may refer to:

- Gordon State College, a public college in Barnesville, Georgia
- Gordon College (Massachusetts), a Christian college in Wenham, Massachusetts
- Government Gordon College, a college in Rawalpindi, Punjab, Pakistan
- Gordon College (Philippines), a public university in Olongapo City, Zambales
- Gordon College of Education, a college in Haifa, Israel
- Gordon Memorial College, Khartoum, Sudan
