= Alculympics =

Multi-sport event in the Philippines

- Formation: 2009
- Legal status: Association
- Headquarters: Pamantasan ng Lungsod ng Maynila
- Location: Philippines
- Members: 18 institutions
- President: Atty. Adel A. Tamano

Alculympics, founded in 2009, is a sports league and triennial multi-sport event involving participants from the current 18 member schools of the Association of Local Colleges and Universities in the Philippines.

The five-day tournament has 14 sports events, including volleyball, basketball, table tennis, taekwondo, arnis, and track and field. One of the highlights of this event is the search for "Miss Alculympics".

The first Alculympics was hosted from January 19 to 23, 2009 by the Pamantasan ng Lungsod ng Marikina at the Marikina Sports Center, with the theme "Towards a Dynamic Culture of Sportsmanship."

The third Alculympics was hosted from March 6 to 11, 2011 at Calapan City, Oriental Mindoro.

== Member schools ==
=== Metro Manila ===
Institution	Nickname	Founded	Color	Location
Pamantasan ng Lungsod ng Marikina	PLMar Golden Wolves	2003	Gold and White	Marikina
Pamantasan ng Lungsod ng Maynila	PLM Panthers	1965	Blue, Red, Gold, Green	Intramuros, Manila
Pamantasan ng Lungsod ng Valenzuela	PLV	2002	Blue and White	Valenzuela City
Pamantasan ng Lungsod ng Muntinlupa	PLMun Marshalls	1991	Green and White	Muntinlupa
University of Makati	UMak Hardy Herons	1972	Green and Gold	Makati
Quezon City Polytechnic University	QCPU Titans	1994	Blue, White and Green	Quezon City
Pamantasan ng Lungsod ng Pasay	PLP Green Eagles		Green and White	Pasay
Taguig City University	TCU	2009	Blue and Gold	Taguig
Pamantasan ng Lungsod ng Pasig	PLP Green Stallions	2000	Green and Yellow	Pasig
Universidad de Manila	UdM Merlions	1995	Green	Manila

== Editions and results ==
1st Alculympics
Event	1st place, gold medalist(s)	2nd place, silver medalist(s)	3rd place, bronze medalist(s)
Arnis (Anyo)	Pamantasan ng Lungsod ng Valenzuela	Bulacan Polytechnic College	Bago City College
Arnis (Full-body contact)	Pamantasan ng Lungsod ng Marikina	Pamantasan ng Lungsod ng Valenzuela	Bulacan Polytechnic College
Badminton (Women's)	University of Makati	Pamantasan ng Cabuyao	Quezon City Polytechnic University/Gordon College
Badminton (Men's)	Pamantasan ng Lungsod ng Maynila	Pamantasan ng Lungsod ng Marikina	Bago City College
Basketball (Women's)	University of Makati	Pamantasan ng Lungsod ng Muntinlupa	Pamantasan ng Lungsod ng Maynila
Basketball	Pamantasan ng Lungsod ng Muntinlupa	Pamantasan ng Lungsod ng Maynila	Pamantasan ng Lungsod ng Marikina
Cheerdance	University of Makati	Bago City College	Urdaneta City University
Dancesports (Latin)	Bago City College	Pamantasan ng Lungsod ng Maynila	Gordon College
Dancesports (Standard)	Bago City College	Gordon College	Quirino Polytechnic College
Chess (Women's)	Quirino Polytechnic College	Laguna University	Quezon City Polytechnic University
Chess (Men's)	Pamantasan ng Lungsod ng Marikina	Pamantasan ng Bayan ng San Mateo	Pamantasan ng Lungsod ng Valenzuela
Table Tennis (Women's)	Pamantasan ng Lungsod ng Maynila	Urdaneta City University	Pamantasan ng Cabuyao and Bago City College
Table Tennis (Men's)	Bago City College	Pamantasan ng Lungsod ng Maynila	Quirino Polytechnic College and Urdaneta City University
Taekwondo	University of Makati	Pamantasan ng Lungsod ng Marikina	Quirino Polytechnic College
Volleyball (Women's)	Bulacan Polytechnic College	Urdaneta City University	Pamantasan ng Lungsod ng Maynila
Volleyball (Men's)	Bulacan Polytechnic College	Pamantasan ng Lungsod ng Marikina	Gordon College
