= DXBD =

Radio station in Zamboanga del Norte, Philippines

Radyo Natin Dipolog (DXBD)

Dipolog; Philippines
- Broadcast area: Eastern Zamboanga del Norte
- Frequency: 100.5 MHz
- Branding: 100.5 Radyo Natin

Programming
- Languages: Cebuano, Filipino
- Format: Community radio
- Network: Radyo Natin

Ownership
- Owner: MBC Media Group

History
- First air date: October 7, 2002 (as Hot FM); 2017 (as Radyo Natin)
- Former call signs: DXHD (2002–2010)
- Former frequencies: 89.7 MHz (Early 2000s)

Technical information
- Licensing authority: NTC
- Power: 1 kW

Links
- Website: radyonatin.com

100.5 Radyo Natin (DXBD 100.5 MHz) is an FM station in the Philippines owned and operated by the MBC Media Group. Its studios and transmitter are located at the 5th floor, Nursing Bldg., DMC College Foundation Campus, Fr. Nicasio Y. Patangan Road, Brgy. Sta. Filomena, Dipolog.
