= De La Salle Supervised Schools =

Private schools in the Philippines

Lasallian Schools Supervision Office
- Type: Lasallian
- Religious affiliation: Roman Catholic
- Academic affiliations: De La Salle Brothers, De La Salle Philippines
- Director: Br. Felipe C. Belleza Jr., FSC
- Location: Philippines
- Campus: Luzon, Visayas, and Mindanao
- Colors: Green and white
- Website: www.delasallesupervisedschools.org

The De La Salle Supervised Schools is a network of Lasallian private schools in the Philippines under the wing of the Lasallian Schools Supervision Services Association, Inc. (LASSSAI) through its mission arm, the Lasallian Schools Supervision Office (LASSO).

== History ==
=== Origins ===
Based on recorded history, the De La Salle Brothers' supervision began, albeit informally, as far back as 1954. Brothers doing "supervision" during the early days were just performing "individual apostolates". Although significant and very memorable to beneficiaries of such a ministry, the initial attempts were very unceremonious. In fact, there were three attempts to set up an office for the De La Salle Supervised Schools prior to 1995. One was in 1963, in the then La Salle College-Bacolod, intended for the hacienda-supervised schools. This was an office composed of a Brother Supervisor, a Lay Supervisor and a full-time secretary. The office closed in 1977 when the Lay Supervisor resigned.

The second attempt was in De La Salle University on Taft Avenue, Manila, then spearheaded by Br. Thomas Cannon FSC. Br. Thomas had been supervising since 1965, but the office was not formalized until 1971. He had a secretary who took charge of all the correspondences and all the communications involved in his tasks. However, it also closed in 1982, when the supervisor ended his term.

The third attempt was in 1991, with Br. Narciso Erquiza, Jr. FSC. The office was located at the Provincialate in La Salle Green Hills, but was also closed when Br. Narciso was transferred to another assignment.

While the establishment of these offices was a by-product of the existence of schools being assisted in many different areas, the Brothers' attempts have continued through the years. These schools and their very running evolved into a ministry long-recognized in the entire Lasallian community.

=== The first schools ===
The 2006 LASSO Manual of Operations for the Supervised Schools identified The Peninsula School, intended for the children of employees of the refinery in Limay, Bataan in 1960. It has recognized Br. U. Alphonsus Bloemen as having accepted the invitation to supervise the school. Br. Andrew Gonzalez confirmed this fact in his working paper, "Towards a Management Model for the Supervised Schools", published in 1982. However, he further adds that it was La Salle Green Hills which "entered into that agreement", and that Br. U. Alphonsus was the school's first supervisor. There were later claims that the supervision was "informal" and that the school was intended for the children of the expatriate employees residing in the refinery. The school was offered to the Brothers in 1967, but after an exploratory visit conducted by Br. U. Alphonsus Bloemen FSC and Br. H. Gabriel Connon FSC, the offer was declined. Three reasons were identified for the Brothers' refusal: "(1) There were adequate public schools and government trade schools in the area; (2) The population was small and limited to children of the middle class working men; and (3) it was not financially feasible". Supervision continued though and Br. Eric Elligson FSC was later on tasked to assume the supervisory post.

In similar fashion one of the first schools supervised by the Brothers then residing at La Salle Bacolod was Immaculate Conception Free School (ICFS) in Villamonte. Villamonte was named Barrio Obrero and was the center where workers from nearby haciendas converged and formed a community. The ICFS was established in 1949, through the efforts of the Young Ladies Association of Charity (YLAC) through its founding president, Miss Lydia Lizares. It came under the informal direct supervision of the Brothers in 1954. The area allotted for the school was a one-and-a-half-hectare piece of land donated by the then governor, Alfredo Montelibano. It started as a tie-up between the YLAC with the supervision of the La Consolacion Sisters, prior to 1954. In 1960, its name was changed to St. Joseph's High School, and Br. Gratian of Mary (Murray) FSC became its first school director/supervisor. St. Joseph's High School later became St. Joseph School – La Salle, a District School.

=== Supervision ===
In the past, the supervised schools were the singular domain of the De La Salle Brothers who acted as supervising agents. Later other Lasallians became involved; since the late 1980s the De La Salle supervised schools have had lay supervisors from among the middle managers of the De La Salle University-Manila, De La Salle-Santiago Zobel, La Salle Green Hills and University of St. La Salle.

In 1996, the Lasallian Schools Supervision Services Association, Inc. (LASSSAI) was established to systematize the management and supervision of schools.

=== LASSO ===
The Lasallian Schools Supervision Office (LASSO), the implementing arm of the LASSSAI, was created to continue the task of supervising schools.

As the number of schools under the supervision of the LASSSAI increased, workshop meetings were held in August 2003 at La Salle Green Hills, and on June 10, 2004, at the DLSU-Manila. The LASSO superintendent, Dr. Herminia Torres facilitated the workshop on Categories of LASSO Supervision with input from the DLSU System President, Br. Armin Luistro FSC. In that workshop, the LASSO Supervisors formulated the initial draft of the new model of supervision. Consultations were also held with the LASSSAI Board of Trustees, De La Salle Brothers' communities, supervisors from Visayas and Mindanao, the De La Salle Supervised Schools' Heads and Boards of Trustees, and Administrators of La Salle schools involved in supervision.

LASSO proposed a new structure of supervision whereby schools with capability for supervision would be invited to assist other schools. This structure is in line with the De La Salle Philippines' (DLSP) declaration of the Revitalized Communion in Mission which includes "a unified system of supervising schools to extend educational services beyond the boundaries of Lasallian institutions".

A consultation with the heads of De La Salle District Schools by the Education, Research and Services (ERS) office of DLSP found a consensus among school heads with regard to extending educational services. LASSO, on the other hand, went into an extensive consultation with the heads of identified District Schools, later on referred to as LASSO Partners schools, with regard to the plan of placing all supervising efforts under one supervising entity. The details of the new structure of supervision were also discussed. In support of the new structure, the governing board of LASSO approved the creation of the Regional Centers for supervision in three regions, namely, La Salle University-Ozamiz (Mindanao), University of St. La Salle (Visayas) and De La Salle University-Manila (Luzon). The objectives of supervision, governance, and model of supervision, among others, were then constituted into a revised Administrative and Operations Manual during the Annual Workshop of Supervisors in April 2008.

== Supervised schools ==
The De La Salle Supervised Schools are divided into three geographical regions, called a Superintendency (list also includes "consultancy schools"):

Luzon

- De La Salle Andres Soriano Memorial College
- De La Salle Araneta University
- De La Salle-College of Saint Benilde
- De La Salle University-Dasmariñas
- De La Salle John Bosco College
- De La Salle Lipa
- De La Salle Medical and Health Sciences Institute
- De La Salle University Rufino Campus
- De La Salle University
- Escuela de Nuestra Señora de La Salette
- Our Lady of the Holy Rosary School
- Children of Mary Immaculate College
- School of Saint Brother Benilde
- Jesus the Risen Savior School
- La Salle Green Hills
- Our Lady of Fatima Academy
- San Lorenzo Academy
- St. Stephen's Academy
- Vincentian Catholic Academy
- Academia de San Francisco Javier
- Academe of Donna Christine
- San Lorenzo Ruiz Formation and Learning Center
- Fr. Fay Francis Catholic School
- St. John Integrated School
- San Benildo Integrated School Foundation (Baliuag) Inc.
- College of San Benildo - Rizal
- Naga College Foundation
- Academy of Saint John - General Trias
- Leonides S. Virata Memorial School

Visayas

- College of St. John–Roxas
- La Salle College–Victorias
- Scola Guadalupana
- St. Francis of Assisi School of Silay City Foundation
- Holy Family School
- St. Cecilia's College - Cebu, Inc.
- St. Michael Academy
- St. Dominic Savio Learning Center
- St. Benilde School Inc.
- Lide Learning Center Inc.
- Colegio de San Antonio de Padua
- St. Joseph School - La Salle

Mindanao

- DMC-College Foundation
- Maryknoll High School of Lambajon
- Rizal Special Education Learning Center
- Holy Name School Foundation Inc.
