= St. John's Institute – Hua Ming =

St. John's Institute
- Seal

Location
- Location of the main campus
- Bacolod and Talisay, Negros Occidental; Philippines
- 10°40′31″N 122°57′30″E

Information
- Other name: Hua Ming
- Former name: Hua Ming Catholic Mission School (1959–1960)
- Type: Private
- Motto: Duc in Altum (Launch into the deep)
- Religious affiliation: Roman Catholicism
- Established: 1959; 67 years ago
- President: Nelson W. Señoron
- Chairman: Benjamin D. Lopue Jr.
- Principal: Mariedel D. Isulat (2020-)
- Grades: K to 12
- Enrollment: 1,750
- Campus: Main: Hilado St., Bacolod, Negros Occidental; Satellite: National Highway, Talisay, Negros Occidental
- Color: Royal Blue
- Newspaper: The Falcon Quarterly
- Website: https://sji.edu.ph/

St John's Institute (SJI) or Hua Ming (Chinese: 華明) is a K-12 private Filipino-Chinese Catholic school in Bacolod, Negros Occidental, Philippines. It was founded in 1959 by Msgrs. John Liu and John Su, two Chinese Catholic priests from Hebei, China, and is one of three Filipino-Chinese Catholic schools in the city, the other two being Bacolod Tay Tung High School and Trinity Christian School. Its main campus is located along Hilado Street, not far from the University of St. La Salle. The school also has a satellite campus in Talisay City.

== History ==
The school was founded by two Catholic priests from China named John Liu and John Su. Both were originally seminarians from the province of Hopeh (now Hebei), and in 1949 they fled to the Philippines to avoid persecution by the Chinese Communist Party due to their faith. In the book Going Beyond the Gold, which was published in 2010 to commemorate the school's golden jubilee, Fr. Su said they snuck out of their dormitories at night using blankets as ropes to climb down from the windows and reached a sampan at the banks of the nearby river.

From there, the two were transported to the Hacarin Farms in Bulacan. Six months later, they were then moved to the St. Joseph Seminary in Mandaluyong complex (now the site of the Ortigas Center), where they finished their theology courses. In 1955, they were both ordained at the Santa Cruz Church in Manila. Afterwards, Su enrolled at the University of Santo Tomas, taking up courses in psychology and education. Meanwhile, Liu was invited by Bishop Manuel Yap to Bacolod, where a steadily growing Chinese-Catholic community had been established. There, he was assigned to be the chaplain of the Queen of Peace Chapel.

In 1957, after finishing his studies, Su joined Liu in Bacolod. The year prior, a 4,000-square meter lot had been donated by Alfredo Montelibano Sr., who previously served as the first mayor of Bacolod, to the Chinese-Catholic community, on the condition that the construction of a two-story building to serve as a rectory for the priests shall commence within four months.

When the Capitol Shopping Center opened near the school's present-day site, the Bacolod Chinese Catholic Association decided to put up a school there. With the help of Liu and Su, the Hua Ming Catholic Mission School was created in 1959. Classes began in June 1959; they were originally held in a vacated area of the shopping center, while a new school building was being constructed. On August 15, 1959, 372 pupils from Kindergarten to Grade 3 moved to the new building when it was finally ready for occupancy. In 1960, the school was renamed to its current name, St. John's Institute, in honor of its patron saint, John the Baptist. However, even today the school is often referred to simply as Hua Ming.

In 1962, the school was incorporated as a non-stock, non-profit corporation due to the nationalization of all foreign-owned schools in the Philippines. Two further land donations were made in the following years–a 4,482-square meter lot was donated in 1964, as well as a 1,000-square meter lot in 1969, totaling 9,482-square meters donated to the school.

Liu died in 2009, followed by Su in 2013. Both were assigned the title of Monsignor.

=== Dispute over Queen of Peace Church ===
In 2017, a dispute arose between the school's board of trustees and the Diocese of Bacolod over the former's decision to "de-parish" the iconic Queen of Peace Parish Church, located on the grounds of the school's main campus. The board of trustees wanted the church status to be reverted to a chapel to put focus on the school, but this was rejected by Bishop Patricio Buzon since the church could serve both a parish church and a school chapel, which it had been doing for years. On May 10, 2017, it was announced that the Queen of Peace Church would no longer be an official place of worship starting May 31; consequently, the school was also stripped of its Catholic status.

On April 10, 2019, the church was reestablished as a chapel by Bishop Buzon. A reconciliation mass was held that same day following a dawn procession from the San Sebastian Cathedral to the school campus.

== Administration ==
This is a list of all principals who managed the school since its founding:

- Joseph Wang (1959–1961)
- John Su (1961–1963, 1965–1975, 2002–2004)
- Peter Tsang (1963–1964)
- Gloria Y. Barcelona (1975–1993, 1995–2000)
- Esteban U. Lo, (1994–1995)
- Emilio A. Ascaño (2000–2002, 2009–2014)
- Noly A. Que (2003–2005)
- Garry Neil Fuentebella (2005–2009)
- Nelsie A. Bravo (2014–2016)
- Jose M. Mongcal (2016–2019)
- Mariedel Isulat (2020–present)

== Campuses ==
=== Main ===
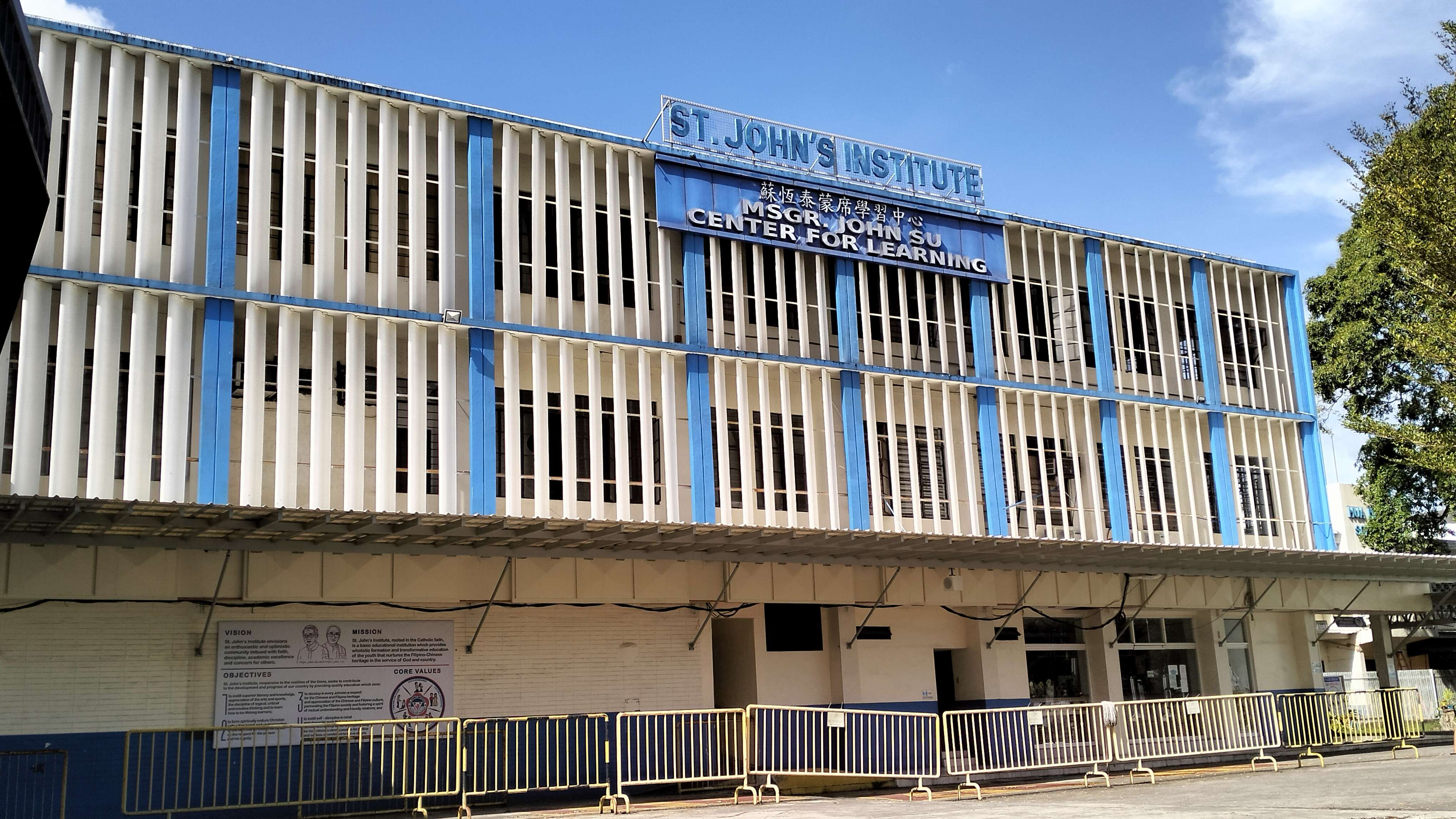
The façade of the main campus elementary building.

The main campus is located along Hilado Street, near the Capitol Hills Shopping Center in Bacolod. It consists of five buildings—one each for the pre-elementary, elementary, and high school departments, as well as the Queen of Peace Chapel and the gymnasium. There are two cafeterias (one in the elementary and another in the high school), two libraries, an auditorium ("Little Theater"), computer laboratories, science laboratories, and a playground in the pre-elementary courtyard. There is also a covered seating space in between the gym and the elementary library, which was formerly an open space used for assemblies. A covered pathway connects the elementary and high school buildings.

The main campus is also located next to the Philippine Red Cross Bacolod Chapter, and just down the street is the Bacolod Chamber Volunteer Fire Brigade. The school is located not far from the University of St. La Salle and Redemptorist Church.

=== Talisay Campus ===
The school’s Talisay campus at Ayala North Point in Talisay, located along National Route 7, was established on property donated in collaboration with Ayala Land Development Corp and the Lacson Estate. The campus, which originally consisted of a single three-story building, now includes an additional academic building that is expected to accommodate 2,000 students, as well as a sports pavilion and a swim center with an Olympic-size swimming pool, all inaugurated on October 20, 2019. According to the school's website, the North Point campus has 212 enrolled students.

== Athletics ==
St. John's Institute is a founding member of NOPSSCEA, an association of private schools in the province that organizes primarily athletic and cultural events. The other founding schools include Colegio San Agustin Bacolod, University of St. La Salle, University of Negros Occidental - Recoletos, STI West Negros University, and Riverside College.

== Incidents ==
=== Kidnapping attempts ===
In 2015, the Bacolod City Police Office was informed of an attempted kidnapping incident that occurred within the school's premises, leading to heightened security measures around the campus.

Security concerns were again raised in 2017 amidst the Queen of Peace Church dispute with at least two noted cases of attempted kidnapping.

=== Threats of violence ===
On December 9, 2022, school personnel and the parents of some students received text messages from an unidentified texter at around 5 am, alleging that there was a bomb within the vicinity of the school's main campus. As a result, school officials ordered the suspension of classes and sought police assistance. The students were gathered at the gymnasium while the police conducted an inspection of the school buildings, but no traces of explosives were found within the school premises. The incident occurred during the quarterly examinations, which were postponed until Monday, December 12.

According Lieutenant Jonito Pastrana of the Bacolod City Police Office, the school had received similar text messages the month prior. A school security guard said that at least six bomb threats were made by unknown individuals.

In the days following the incident, a Facebook page named "Huaming Par" made posts on December 10 and 12 demanding that the school fire one of its faculty members, otherwise the teachers and students would be fired upon by snipers. The account also made threats to behead students from the school. Lt. Pastrana stated that the individual threatening the school may be a disgruntled staff member and that they have a person of interest. He added that the authorities will coordinate a cybercrime unit trace the origin of the text message, and that the texter, if ever found, will be charged for violation of President Decree 1727 in relation to Section 6 of the Cybercrime Prevention Act of 2012. Pastrana also warned the public to stop making such threats as they will be held liable for it.

In the aftermath of the incident, Bacolod City Mayor Alfredo Abelardo Benitez ordered the local police and the National Bureau of Investigation to hasten the investigation into the threats made against the school, with the Philippine National Police also providing its assistance.
