= Jesus the Risen Savior School =

Private school in Laguna, Philippines

Jesus the Risen Savior School International
- Type: Private
- Affiliations: Roman Catholic
- Location: San Pedro, Laguna, Philippines; 14°20′49″N 121°02′22″E
- Website: srkeducationgroupinternational.com/jrss-international/

Jesus the Risen Savior School International is a De La Salle-supervised school in the Philippines. This school is in San Pedro, Laguna, in 4 Sampaguita Avenue, San Pedro, Laguna. JRSS has a gymnasium, conservatory, swimming pool, canteen, and it's air-conditioned classrooms.

== History ==
In. July 1995, Jesus the Risen Savior School was founded by Esmeraldo P. Ilmedo and Raquel M. Ilmedo with the help of a ₱10.5 million loan from Chinabank and a donated plot from the founder's father. JRSSI agreed for De La Salle University supervision by signing an MOA in 1995, and JRSSI earned it's Supervised Accredited Level I and II status in 2003. Due to this JRSS still leads in National Achievement Tests and scored high rankings.

In 2008 JRSS signed an MOA with Hermano Miguel Integrated School or (HMIS) in Noveleta, Cavite. The partnership had made JRSS in charge of HMIS' administrative and academic operations. Ms. Raquel M. Ilmedo became the supervisor of the school.

In 2012, the Bureau of Immigration granted the Authority to Accept Foreign Students as a perpetual permit. The school is also an Application and Testing Center in Laguna for Freshmen Applicants to De La Salle University in 2013.

Now acquired by San Roque Kid Education Group International, JRSS has been rebranded to Jesus the Risen Savior School International, In 2023, a renovation of the campus was set up by the Chairman, CEO, and Founder of San Roque Kid Education Group International, Dr. Richard Paolo B. Deluria.
