= DMC-College Foundation =

Private college in Zamboanga del Norte, Philippines

Dipolog Medical Center College Foundation, Inc.
- Other name: DMC
- Former names: Dipolog Medical Center School of Midwifery; Dipolog Medical Center College of Health Sciences
- Motto: Teaching Minds, Touching Hearts, Transforming Lives
- Established: August 1, 1974 (52 years and 96 days)
- Academic affiliations: De La Salle Supervised Schools; Catholic Education Association of the Philippines
- President: Atty. Albert T. Concha, Jr.
- Location: Fr. Nicasio Y. Patangan Road, Santa Filomena, Dipolog, Philippines; 8.571389°N 123.346111°E
- Campus: Dipolog
- Colors: Green
- Website: www.dmc.edu.ph

The DMC-College Foundation, Inc. (DMC-CFI), also known as DMC De La Salle, supervised by De La Salle Brothers, is a paramedical institution of the province of Zamboanga del Norte. It is situated in suburban Dipolog and occupies 22,500 square meters of land area. Its sprawling expanse contains several buildings which include the DMC Hospital and its laboratories, the four-storey Basic Education and School of Hotel Restaurant and Institution Management Building, the six-room IT Center, the four-storey Nursing Building with the Nursing Arts Center on the fourth floor and on the top floor the campus radio 100.5 Radyo Natin Dipolog (formerly 100.5 Hot FM Dipolog) and the library which covers the entire ground floor, the Arts and Sciences building with separate structures for a Zoology lab, the cafeteria, and the DMC Covered Court for sports and other activities.

== History ==
=== 1974-1990, early beginnings ===
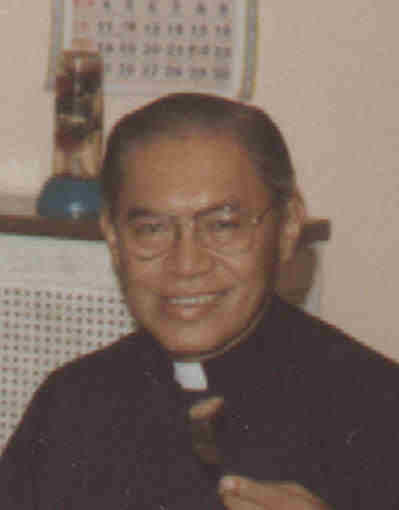
Bishop Felix Zafra, one of the proponents for establishing Dipolog Medical Center, Inc.

DMC-CFI, then named Dipolog Medical Center School of Midwifery, began as an expansion program of Dipolog Medical Center Inc., a stock corporation which started operating on August 1, 1974, as a fifty-bed general hospital located in Sta. Filomena, Dipolog. Dipolog Medical Center (DMC) is the realization of the ideas of fifteen Dipolog medical practitioners and Msgr. Felix Sanchez Zafra, the first Bishop of Dipolog, pooling their expertise and resources together to establish a high-quality hospital facility in the city. It took more than two years for the institution to open a course of Midwifery, which began operating in 1977.

In 1989, after a series of financial setbacks, a new management team took over the helm of DMC within a year. The new management felt the need for exposing more young men and women of the cities of Dipolog and Dapitan and the neighboring municipalities to medical training and the medical profession. Through the efforts of chairman of the Board Atty. Alberto P. Concha (b. 1939, d. 2020) and Hospital Director Dr. Stephen Yap, the Bachelor of Science in Nursing (BSN) curriculum was opened. The permit by the Bureau of Higher Education was granted on April 30, 1991, and the school began its first year level of BSN June of that year.

=== 1991-1997, DMCCHS years ===
In the same year, the name of the school was changed to Dipolog Medical Center College of Health Sciences. DMCCHS became a grantee of the Johns Hopkins International Education for Reproductive Health Foundation which, in collaboration with the Association of Deans of Philippine Colleges of Nursing (ADPCN), bestowed DMCCHS an extension of its hospital facility, the JHPIEGO Center.

In its continuing aim for excellence and growth, the management initiated the application to the Department of Education for permits to open other programs in the health sciences. In 1994, the Bachelor of Science in Physical Therapy (BSPT) began its first year level, and in 1996, the Bachelor of Science in Medical Technology (BSMT) and the Bachelor of Science in Radiologic Technology (BSRT) also opened for enrolment.

=== 1998-present, DMCCFI years ===
In 1998, the Dipolog Medical Center College of Health Sciences was once again renamed the Dipolog Medical Center College Foundation, Inc. in recognition of its conversion into a non-profit organization. In the same year, it opened its Masters program and started conferring the degree in Master in Public Administration. Two more bachelor's degree programs were also opened that same year, the Bachelor of Science in Criminology and Bachelor of Science in Computer Science.

In 2000, the DMC Science High School was opened. New programs were also initiated: Bachelor of Science in commerce, Bachelor of Secondary Education, Bachelor of Elementary Education, Bachelor of Arts in Political Science, and Bachelor of Civil Engineering were opened.

In 2003, in consortium with Negros Oriental State University (NORSU), the school launched the programs Doctorate in Management, Doctorate in Education, and Master of Arts in Educational Management courses.

DMC Science High School signed a consultancy agreement with the La Sallian Schools Supervision Office (LASSO) in 2005, placing the DMC-SHS under Consultancy Status for a period of one year. While under Consultancy Status, the school was extended LASSO's assistance in curricula, training, and organizational structure.

In November 2005, DMCCFI began its placement and staffing agency – the Staff Builders LLC, a United States-based Limited Liability Corporation, the purpose of which is to assist nurse and physical therapist alumni of DMCCFI who are seeking employment in the United States.

On December 15, 2008, the permits for the first and second levels for Bachelor of Science in Hotel and Restaurant Management were issued by the Commission on Higher Education. This was followed by the issuance of the permit for the third level on February 3, 2010, of BS HRM.

The school year 2010-2011 marks the opening of the College of Law after the CHED issued its permit last March 29, 2010. It is headed by Dean Villarruz, a lawyer who graduated from the Ateneo de Manila University. The college vouches for a good line of faculty members, most of whom graduated from prestigious schools like the University of the Philippines, De La Salle Schools and Notre Dame Schools.

Presently, the college has been granted Applicant Status by PAASCU. Likewise, the college is also pursuing its status for the Institutional Monitoring and Evaluation for Quality Assurance in Higher Education (IQuaME).

== Notable alumni ==
- Jerry Barbaso - (b. 1988) - Filipino footballer who last played as a defender for Ceres–Negros F.C. in the Philippines Football League, and Philippines national football team
