= Our Lady of Mercy College – Bacolod =

Private college in Bacolod, Philippines

Our Lady of Mercy College - Bacolod
- Other names: Bacolod Our Lady of Mercy College
- Type: private medical college
- Established: 2008
- Location: Bacolod, Negros Occidental, Philippines
- Campus: Urban

Our Lady of Mercy College – Bacolod, Inc. (OLMC-B, Inc.) is a private Technical Vocational Education Training (TVET) school offering TESDA registered programs in Bacolod, Philippines. The college is owned by the Bacolod Queen of Mercy Hospital (BQMH), which serves as its training and teaching facility. It is the second school affiliated with a teaching hospital to be established in Bacolod, the first being Riverside College

== History ==
The school was established early in 2008 when the management of the Bacolod Queen of Mercy Hospital (then Bacolod Our Lady of Mercy Specialty Hospital) decided to make further use of their hospital facilities for purposes other than providing medical care. To this end, a college for Nursing was established to begin operating during the 2008-2009 school year. The school initially offered a degree course in Nursing in 2008 - 2011. As a TVET school, it offers a one-year certificate program in Practical Nursing, Health Care Services NC II, a six-month certificate program, and Household Services NC II, a one-month certificate program.

== See also ==
- List of tertiary schools in Bacolod
