= Urdaneta City University =

Public university in Pangasinan, Philippines

- Pamantasang Lungsod ng Urdaneta (Filipino)
- Former name: City Colleges of Urdaneta
- Type: Public, Nonsectarian, higher education institution
- Established: February 4, 1966; 60 years ago
- Academic affiliations: ALCU
- Chairman: Julio F. Parayno III
- President: Atty. Dar A. Diga
- Vice-president: Josephine S.LambinicioEdD (VP for Academic Affairs); Raquel D. Pascua, PhD (VP for Administrative Affairs)
- Students: 12,500 (2015)
- Location: Urdaneta City, Pangasinan, Philippines; 15°58′50.1492″N 120°33′38.4912″E
- Hymn: UCU Hymn
- Colors: White, Green and Gold
- Website: ucu.edu.ph
- Location in Luzon Location in the Philippines

Urdaneta City University (UCU) is a public university located in Urdaneta City, Pangasinan, Philippines. It was founded in 1966 by Dr. Pedro T. Orata as the Urdaneta Community College (UCC). The school is considered to be one of the first community colleges in the Philippines.

== History ==
UCU was founded in 1966 by Dr. Pedro T. Orata with the support of Mayor Amadeo R. Perez Jr. and the Sangguniang Bayan using the proceeds of the 1966 town fiesta celebration. The college started with a provisional permit to open a two-year General Education course granted by the Secretary of Education and a program for Non-formal Education. Short-term courses in agriculture and retail business for adults were also offered to assist students in enhancing their earning capabilities.

Over the years, the college grew and expanded its educational services by offering new courses, such as Midwifery (1973), Nursing (1975), Computer Education (1990), Graduate School (1995), Commerce and Accountancy (1996), and Caregiver Training Program (2002). Despite its limited resources, UCC proved to be one of the top-performing higher learning institutions in the fields of education, nursing, and midwifery.

In 1998, Urdaneta became a city, and UCC adopted a new name, City College of Urdaneta. In 2006, the institution was declared as Urdaneta City University and was confirmed as such by the Sangguniang Panglunsod of Urdaneta.

== Campus & Facilities ==
UCU has its own facilities and has grown steadily over the years. The university continues to attract students from neighboring provinces, such as Abra, Aurora, Isabela, Ilocos, Nueva Vizcaya, Tarlac, Quezon, Mt. Province, and Pampanga.

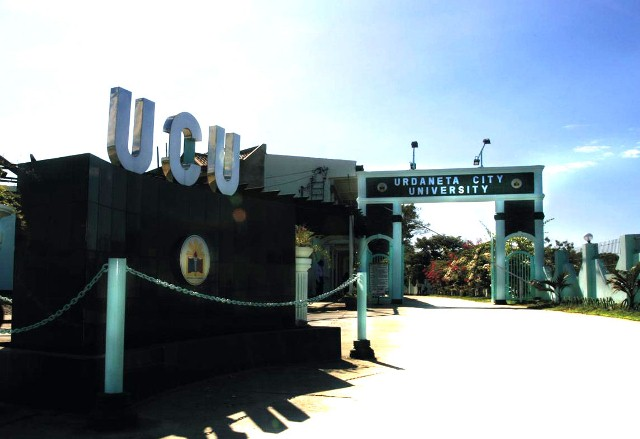
UCU Facade

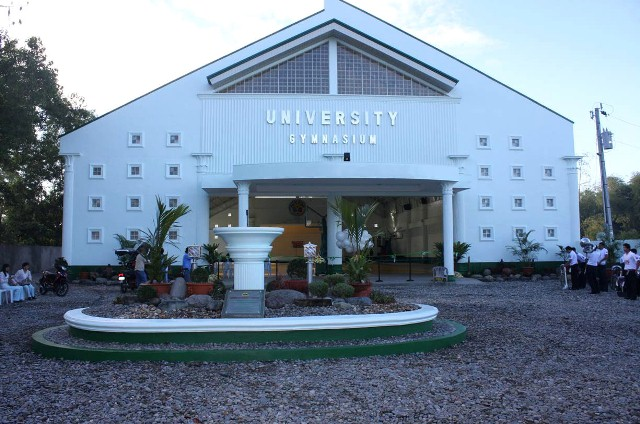
University Gymnasium

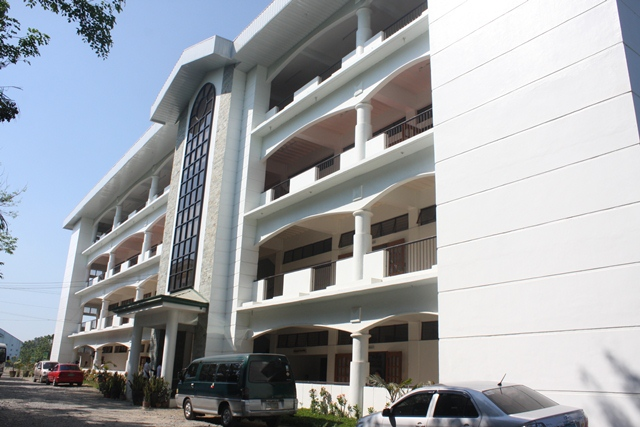
Orata Building 1

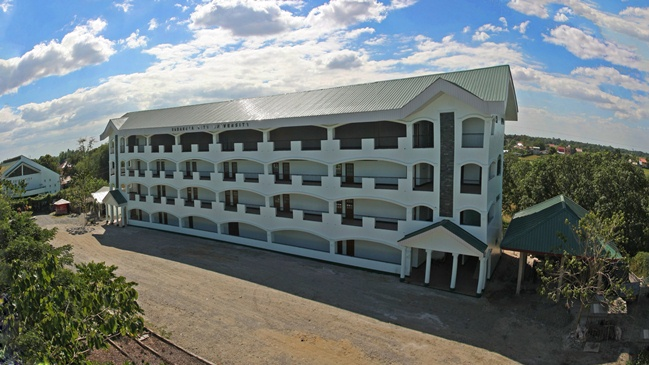
Orata Building 2

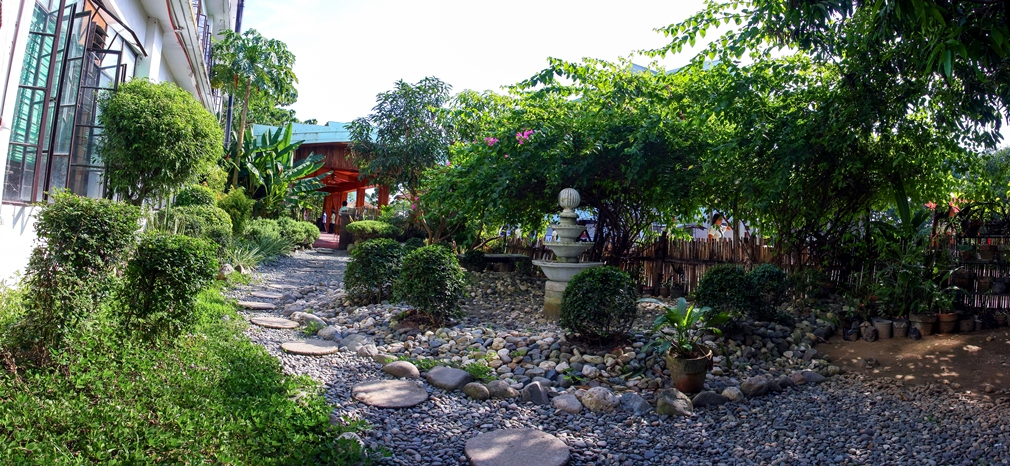
Clean and Green (Likas Yaman 2007 Awardee)

== See also ==
- Local colleges and universities
- Association of Local Colleges and Universities
- Pamantasan
- Alculympics
