= Rizal Special Education Learning Center =

Private school in Davao City, Philippines

- Type: Private
- Affiliations: Roman Catholic
- Location: Davao City, Philippines; 7°04′25″N 125°36′22″E
- Hymn: La Salle Alma Mater

Rizal Special Education Learning Center, also known as Rizal Sped De La Salle, is a De La Salle-supervised school located in Davao City, Philippines.

== History ==
In 1986, three educators thought of opening a school offering courses with their respective specialization: preschool, intellectually challenged, and hearing-Impaired education. The main goal of opening the Rizal Special Education Learning Center is to help educate pupils/students with special needs such as the hearing impaired, intellectually challenged, autistic, slow learners and fast learners. However, the need for regular atmosphere for eventual mainstreaming prompted the founders to open classes for regular pupils, thus, regular classes were opened with two grade levels every school year until Elementary Course was complete.

After nine years, it was observed that a lot of the graduate expressed their desires and sentiments to proceed with the secondary level in the same school. On the appeal of the parents, the concept was considered and realized.

The two levels in secondary Course were opened in 1995–1996. The following year attendance soared, which made it necessary to relocate from Rizal Sped, Davao City to the present site.

On January 18, 1996, the new building at Pardo de Tavern Street, Davao City, was inaugurated and upon the opening of the school year 1996-1997 all levels started to move classes in three thousand square meter campus. It was then, that the name of the school was changed to Rizal Special Education Learning Center.

The school became a De La Salle Consultancy School in school year 1998-1999 and in school year 1999–2000, the school became a De La Salle-supervised school on probationary status. In February, 2002 the school has met the standards and fulfilled all the requirements for De La Salle Supervised Accredited Status for level I and level II in June 2005. The Federation of Accrediting Agencies of the Philippines granted Level I status to RSELC for having met the standards and fulfilled all the requirements of the Philippine Accrediting Association of Schools, Colleges and Universities (PAASCU) in June 2006.

The Rizal Sped Special Education Learning Center has the following courses offered: The Preschool Course with Government Recognition No. 001, s. 1990.
