= Gordon College (Olongapo) =

Public college in Olongapo, Philippines

- Dalubhasaang Gordon (Filipino)
- Former name: Olongapo City College (Before 1999)
- Motto: Excellence, Character, Service
- Type: Public university, Local university
- Established: 1999; 27 years ago
- Academic affiliations: ALCU
- President: Dr. Imelda DP. Soriano
- Location: Olongapo City Sports Complex, Donor St., East Tapinac, Olongapo City, Zambales, Philippines; 14°49′59″N 120°16′56″E
- Campus: Main Campus Olongapo City Sports Complex, Donor St., East Tapinac, Olongapo City: Annex Campus Oregon St., Barangay Kalaklan, Olongapo City
- Alma Mater song: Gordon College Hymn
- Colors: Green and yellow
- Website: gordoncollege.edu.ph/w3/
- Location in Luzon Location in the Philippines

Gordon College (Filipino: Dalubhasaang Gordon) is a local government-funded university run by the virtue of City Ordinance No. 9 in Olongapo City, Zambales, Philippines. It was founded on February 24, 1999. It is composed of five constituent colleges: College of Computer Studies (1999), College of Business and Accountancy (1999), College of Allied Health and Sciences (2000), College of Education, Arts and Sciences (2003) and later, College of Hospitality and Tourism Management (2018). Other academic units include the Department of Vocational Technology, Faculty of Arts and Sciences, Center for Research and Development, and Institute of Graduate Studies.

== Academic programs ==
=== Graduate Studies ===
- Master of Arts in Education major in Educational Management
- Master of Arts in Nursing
- Master in Business Management
- Master in Public Management

=== Undergraduate Courses ===
For College of Allied Health and Sciences

- Bachelor of Science in Midwifery
- Bachelor of Science in Nursing

For College in Business and Accountancy

- Bachelor of Science in Accountancy
- Bachelor of Science in Business Administration
  - Major in:
    - Financial Management
    - Human Resource Management
    - Marketing Management
- Bachelor of Science in Customs Administration

For College of Computer Studies

- Bachelor of Science in Computer Science
- Bachelor of Science in Entertainment and Multimedia Computing
  - Major in:
    - Digital Animation Technology
    - Game Development
- Bachelor of Science in Information Technology

For College of Education, Arts and Sciences

- Bachelor of Arts in Communication
- Bachelor of Culture and Arts Education
- Bachelor of Early Childhood Education
- Bachelor of Elementary Education (General Education)
- Bachelor of Physical Education
- Bachelor of Secondary Education
  - Major in:
    - English
    - Filipino
    - Mathematics
    - Science
    - Social Studies

For College in Hospitality and Tourism Management

- Bachelor of Science in Hospitality Management
- Bachelor of Science in Tourism Management

=== K-12 Curriculum ===
- Senior High School (Dissolved in 2022)

== Notable people ==
Media
Name	Year/Degree	Notability
Anita Rose Gomez	B.S. Customs Administration	Miss Asia Pacific International 2025 First Runner-up

== See also ==
- Alculympics
- Association of Local Colleges and Universities
- Pamantasan
