= VMA Global College =

Private maritime college in Bacolod, Philippines

VMA Global College & Training Centers, Inc.
- Former name: Visayan Maritime Academy
- Type: Private maritime college
- Established: 1973
- President: Dr. Elizabeth O. Salabas
- Location: Bacolod City, Negros Occidental, Philippines; 10°35′59″N 122°54′52″E
- Campus: Urban
- Sporting affiliations: NOPSSCEA
- Website: www.vma.edu.ph

- Location in the Visayas Location in the Philippines

VMA Global College, officially the VMA Global College and Training Centers, Incorporated, is a private maritime college in Bacolod, Negros Occidental, Philippines.

== History ==
In 1973, Philippine Ambassador to Japan Roberto Benedicto founded the Visayan Maritime Academy. In May 1986, management decided to close down the school. The school re-opened the next year under the management of Asian Mari-Tech Development Corporation under a 10-year lease-purchase agreement. In June 1996, the agreement matured and the Asian Mari-Tech Development Corporation acquired the school.

Growth brought about by scholarship programs, international linkages for training and job placement and the move to offer non-maritime courses, caused management to change the school's name from Visayan Maritime Academy to VMA Global College. It was later renamed to VMA Global College and Training Centers, Incorporated. The school also offers TESDA-accredited courses, Junior High School and Senior High School.

== See also ==
- List of tertiary schools in Bacolod City
