= Children of Mary Immaculate College =

Private college in Valenzuela, Philippines

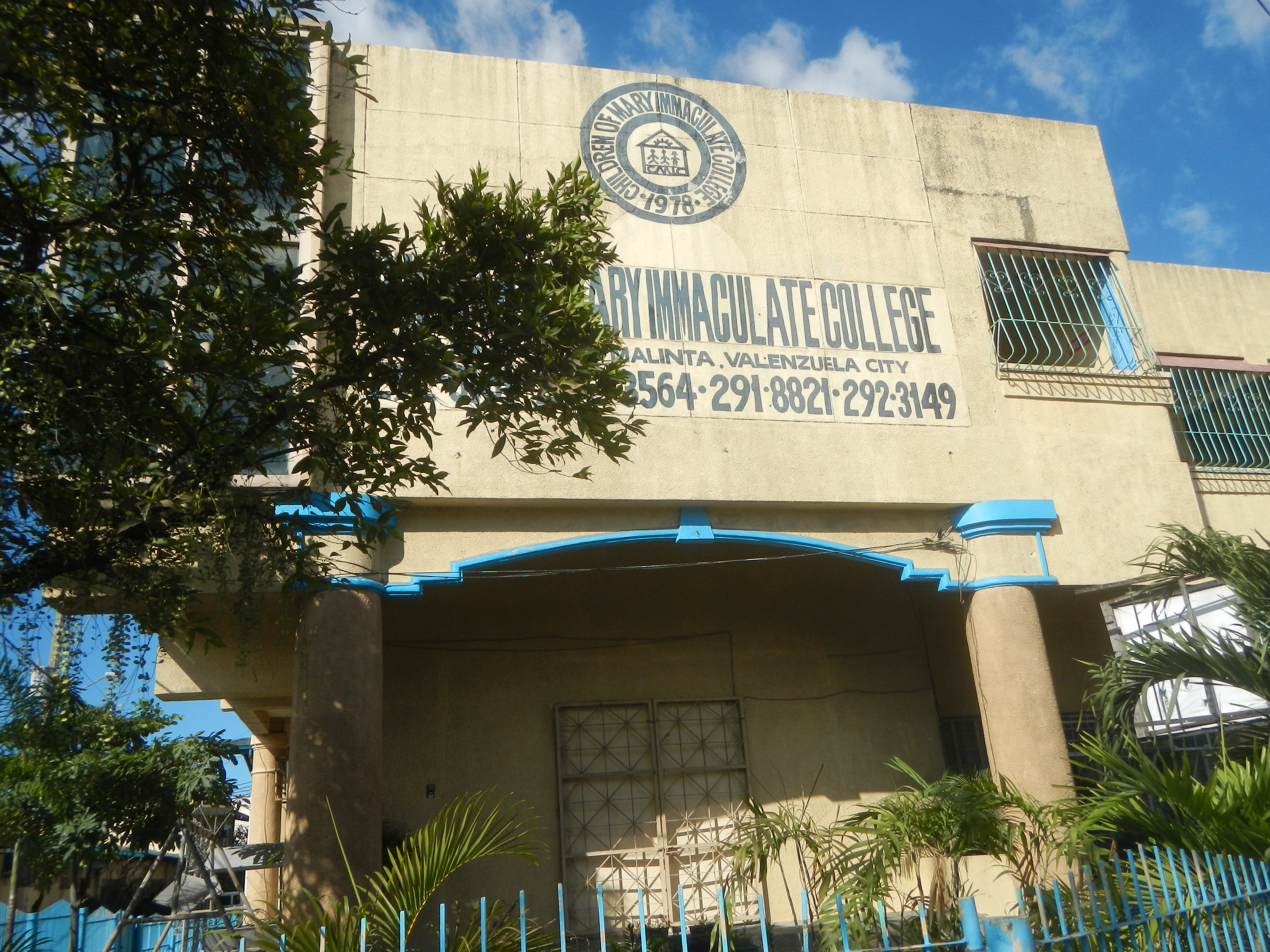
- Children of Mary Immaculate College in January 2018.
- Type: Private non-profit coeducational basic and higher education institution
- Established: 1979
- Founder: Eleanor de Leon-Llenado
- President: Eleanor de Leon-Llenado
- Director: Reena Grace Chavez
- Location: 22 Maysan Road, Malinta, Valenzuela, Philippines; 14°41′38″N 120°58′03″E
- Campus: Urban, 3.8 ha (9.4 acres)
- Location in Metro Manila Location in Luzon Location in the Philippines

Children of Mary Immaculate College (CMIC) is a private institution located at 22 Maysan Road, Malinta, Valenzuela City, Philippines. CMIC was founded by Eleanor de Leon-Llenado.

== History ==
The grade school was opened in 1979 with an initial enrolment of 29 pupils. Thenceforth, the school population and school building facilities steadily grew. In 1985, the school opened its High School Department with only 15 students. Four years later, the school graduated its first batch of 19 pioneers at the National Shrine of Our Lady of Fatima with the NCR chief of secondary schools, Dr. Pilar Pascual, as guest of honor. For eight consecutive years, the High School Department took pride in the 100% passing of students in the National College Entrance Examination (NCEE) and its successor, the National Secondary Achievement Test (NSAT), introduced in 1994–95 after NCEE was abolished.

In 1995, the College Department was opened with an enrollment of 50 students. The department initially offered the following degree programs: Bachelor of Arts, bachelor of elementary education, bachelor of secondary education, Bachelor of Science in commerce, Bachelor of Science in computer and the two–year program, associate in computer technology. To date, the College Department maintains the offering of bachelor's degrees in education, for elementary and high school and Bachelor of Science in commerce. The rest have been gradually phased out.

By the opening of school year 1999–2000, CMIC has become a La Salle Consultancy School with a La Salle Brother, Narciso Erquiza, FSC, as its superintendent and Rommel Salvador as its supervisor. In the school year 2000–2001, Salvador was replaced by Judith Aldaba from the De La Salle University and Dr. Victoria Honrada, from De La Salle Zobel School, became CMIC's school head. In the school year 2001–2002, three LASSO supervisors, namely Christopher Polanco, Rommel Sanchez and Sister Teresita Octavio, assisted the school in the preparation for the first–step LASSO accreditation. Gloria Faraon for the College Department and Sonia Annang spearheaded the executive committee for the Grade School and High School Departments. Recommendations were made for further evaluations. A second LASSO accreditation was made the following year. This time, the executive committee was chaired by then school head, Eleanor de Leon–Llenado. The school passed the first phase of the and became a De La Salle Supervised School.

== See also ==
- La Sallian educational institutions
