= Pamantasan ng Lungsod ng Valenzuela =

Public university in the Philippines

- Official seal of the Pamantasan ng Lungsod ng Valenzuela
- Type: Public, Local University
- Established: June 5, 2002
- Chairman: Weslie T. Gatchalian
- President: Nedeña C. Torralba
- Vice-president: Michville A. Rivera (Academic Affairs); John A. Cabaddu (Administration, Planning and Finance)
- Academic staff: 400
- Students: 13,000
- Location: Valenzuela City, Metro Manila,, Philippines; 14.70°N 120.98°E
- Campus: 1.7 hectares (4.2 acres); Urban
- Colors: Blue and white
- Website: valenzuela.plv.edu.ph

The Pamantasan ng Lungsod ng Valenzuela (English: University of the City of Valenzuela), commonly referred to by its acronym PLV, is a local government-funded public university located in Valenzuela City, Metro Manila, Philippines. Established in 2002, the university provides affordable, accessible, and quality higher education to eligible residents of Valenzuela. PLV offers a variety of undergraduate and graduate degree programs across multiple disciplines, including engineering, sciences, education, business, and public administration.

== History ==
The establishment of the Pamantasan ng Lungsod ng Valenzuela was born out of an initiative to provide affordable tertiary education to the city's growing population of high school graduates. Under the administration of then-Mayor Jose Emmanuel L. Carlos, a study group comprising local public high school principals was formed to prepare a developmental plan and formulate policies for a local university.

On June 5, 2002, the Valenzuela City Council officially approved Ordinance No. 14, marking the legal creation of PLV. The university formally opened its doors on June 24, 2002, welcoming an inaugural batch of 500 students. Originally, it operated out of a government building located within the old municipal complex at the heart of the city.

The institution entered a new phase of expansion starting in 2004 under the administration of then-Mayor Sherwin Gatchalian. That same year, the University President Dr. Nedeña C. Torralba and the university expanded its academic offerings to include graduate studies and a Certificate in Teaching Program. To accommodate the surging student population, the city government acquired a parcel of land in 2008 near Children of Mary Immaculate College in Barangay Malinta, which became the Annex Campus.

The university underwent a major infrastructural transformation on January 19, 2018, when then-Mayor Rex Gatchalian inaugurated a state-of-the-art, PhP 361.6-million main campus on Tongco Street in Barangay Maysan. This was followed by the inauguration of a specialized College of Public Administration and Governance (CPAG) building in November 2024.

== Institution ==
The university operates under the auspices of the Valenzuela City Government and is committed to providing a community-focused, competitive education that prepares local citizens for the labor market and civic leadership.

=== Academics ===
PLV comprises several academic colleges offering a broad spectrum of undergraduate and graduate programs. The university is also K-12 ready, offering Senior High School tracks (STEM, ABM, HUMSS, GAS, and Arts and Design).

- College of Accountancy and Business Administration: Offers degrees in Accountancy, and Business Administration (with majors in Financial Management, Marketing Management, and Human Resource Management).
- College of Arts and Sciences: Offers degrees in Psychology, Social Work, and Communication.
- College of Education: Offers Bachelor of Early Childhood Education and Bachelor of Secondary Education (majors in English, Filipino, Mathematics, Science, and Social Studies).
- College of Engineering and Information Technology: Offers Bachelor of Science degrees in Civil Engineering, Electrical Engineering, and Information Technology.
- College of Public Administration and Governance: Offers a Bachelor of Science in Public Administration.

For graduate studies, PLV offers Master's degrees in Education and Public Administration, alongside licensure review classes.

=== Administration ===
The Pamantasan ng Lungsod ng Valenzuela is governed by a Board of Regents, heavily supported by the local government. The incumbent Mayor of Valenzuela City, Weslie T. Gatchalian, serves as its Chairperson. The academic and executive leadership is overseen by the University President, Dr. Nedeña C. Torralba.

=== Social and community involvement ===
PLV's educational philosophy emphasizes a deep commitment to the Valenzuela community. The university actively enforces core values among its student body, cultivating civic-mindedness through principles such as Makabayan (Nationalism), Maka-Kalikasan (Environmentalism), Mapagkakatiwalaan (Responsibility), Malikhain (Creativity), and Matapat at May Dangal (Loyalty and Integrity).

=== Research and development ===
Research at the university is spearheaded by the University Research Development Office (URDO), which works in close collaboration with the Office of Community Engagement and Extension Services (OCEES). The university manages an Official Publication Journal aimed at disseminating peer-reviewed academic outputs from students, faculty, and public policy scholars.

The research agenda of PLV focuses heavily on institutional development, public policy, and organizational effectiveness. Key thematic areas of the university's research publications include Environmental Conservation and Sustainable Development, Governance and Legislation, Entrepreneurship and Business Analytics, Health and Wellness, and Disaster Preparedness and Resiliency.

=== Internship and practicum ===
PLV integrates mandatory Internship and On-the-Job Training programs into its undergraduate curricula, in compliance with the experience-based learning directives of the Commission on Higher Education. The program is designed to bridge the gap between classroom instruction and professional practice, developing students' technical competencies, communication abilities, and soft skills prior to graduation.

PLV maintains active partnerships and formal Memoranda of Agreement (MOA) with various Host Training Establishments (HTEs) across the public and private sectors, with placement settings varying by degree program. Students from the College of Public Administration and Governance are deployed to local and national government agencies. For example, interns stationed at the Department of the Interior and Local Government National Capital Region assist in policy research, data encoding, and local governance analysis.

Meanwhile, student teachers from the College of Education undergo their practicum in public and private educational institutions. They also actively participate in local government and national initiatives, such as the community tutoring programs spearheaded by the Department of Social Welfare and Development (DSWD). Additionally, students enrolled in the College of Engineering and Information Technology, Accountancy and Business Administration, and Arts and Sciences complete their required training hours in corporate settings, tech firms, construction services, and administrative offices to gain hands-on industry experience.

Recent academic tracer studies indicate that PLV's OJT program significantly contributes to the high employability rate of its graduates. The majority of alumni secure employment within six months of graduation, heavily attributing their rapid job placement to the practical experience and professional networks acquired during their internships.

=== Rankings ===
==== Licensure examination performances ====
PLV has consistently demonstrated strong institutional performance across various board examinations administered by the Professional Regulation Commission (PRC). The university's College of Education, widely considered a flagship program, boasts a strong track record in the Licensure Examination for Teachers (LET), frequently producing national topnotchers and earning commendations from the city government for its high passing rates. Similarly, PLV has emerged as a top-performing school nationwide in the Social Workers Licensure Examination, consistently registering flawless or highly exemplary institutional passing rates.

The university also regularly produces a high volume of successful board passers in the Civil Engineers Licensure Examination, significantly contributing to the local engineering and infrastructure workforce. Furthermore, the Psychology department has historically performed exceptionally well, with PLV previously ranking among the highest top-performing schools in the Philippines during the Psychometrician Licensure Examination. In addition, the university maintains a steady and reliable production of successful Certified Public Accountants (CPAs) and Registered Electrical Engineers (REEs), strictly adhering to the rigorous retention and board examination standards set by the Commission on Higher Education (CHED).

==== Other accrediting and professional organizations performances ====
Graduates from the College of Business Administration and the Psychology department regularly take and pass the Certified Human Resource Associate (CHRA) assessment administered by the Human Resource Educators' Association of the Philippines, Inc. (HREAP), validating their proficiency in HR operations and labor relations.

== Campuses ==
PLV utilizes a multi-campus system to accommodate its diverse colleges and administrative offices. Access to all campuses is secured via the "PLV World Card," an RFID-enabled smart ID that registers student attendance and notifies parents or guardians via SMS upon campus entry and exit.

=== Maysan campus ===
The conceptualization and construction of the primary Maysan campus were driven by the local government's objective to expand high-quality, subsidized tertiary education for the rapidly growing population of Valenzuelano students. As the original city hall facilities and the Malinta annex became insufficient for the student body, the administration of Mayor Rex Gatchalian spearheaded the development of a dedicated, larger institutional home.

Constructed with a budget of PhP 361.6 million, the state-of-the-art campus sits on a 1.7-hectare property located along Tongco Street in Barangay Maysan. The architectural design features three multi-story buildings utilizing a distinct Western Mediterranean aesthetic. The campus was officially inaugurated on January 19, 2018, in a ceremony led by Mayor Rex Gatchalian, Senator Sherwin Gatchalian, and other key city officials.

The Maysan campus was designed to significantly modernize the university's academic infrastructure. It houses specialized facilities, including advanced laboratories for mechanical, electrical, and electronics engineering, as well as Information and Communication Technology. The campus also features a digitized library, an audio-visual room, spacious lecture halls, and a dedicated student lounge. During the 2018 inauguration, the university also launched the "PLV World Card," an integrated RFID smart-card system that modernizes campus security, records student attendance via automated SMS notifications to parents, and grants students access to an online portal for their academic records.

=== Annex campus (Malinta) ===
Located along Maysan Road in Barangay Malinta, the Annex campus serves as a vital extension of the university. The property was originally acquired by the city government in 2008 to address the rapidly growing student population that the old city hall campus could no longer accommodate. Historically, the site was the former location of the Children of Mary Immaculate College (CMIC). Following the city's acquisition, the old CMIC structures were eventually demolished to make way for the construction of specialized, modernized academic facilities.

During the COVID-19 pandemic, the local government took the opportunity to initiate a major infrastructural overhaul of the Annex. The newly constructed buildings were architecturally redesigned to mirror the distinct Western Mediterranean aesthetic of the Maysan Main Campus. Today, the Malinta Annex campus serves as the dedicated home for the College of Arts and Sciences (CAS), housing degree programs such as Psychology, Social Work, and Communication Studies. The multi-story CAS building features dedicated administrative offices, multimedia classrooms, and multipurpose assembly halls for student organizations.

=== CPAG campus (Malinta) ===
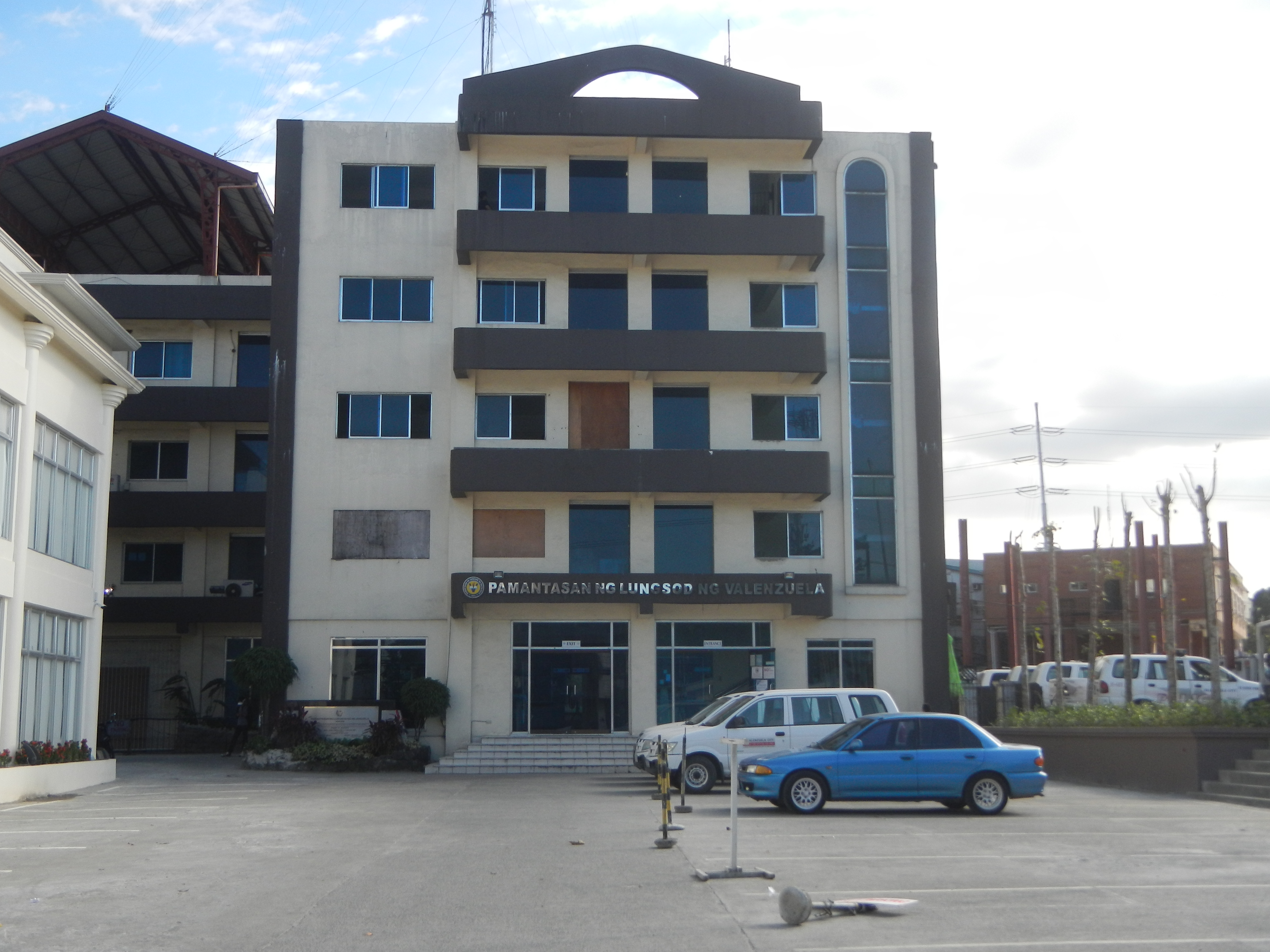
The old PLV Main Campus, located in Malinta, was demolished to give way for the construction and development of a new campus and building for the College of Public Administration and Governance.

To further specialize its academic offerings in public governance, the local government initiated a major infrastructural overhaul to create a dedicated facility for the College of Public Administration and Governance (CPAG). The new campus was constructed on the exact 1,246-square-meter lot that formerly housed the old PLV main building in Barangay Karuhatan. The outdated original campus structure was demolished to make way for a larger, modernized facility capable of supporting the city's growing student population and specialized academic needs.

Funded with a budget of PhP 255 million, the new state-of-the-art CPAG building is an 8-story complex designed to groom the "next-generation leaders" of the local government. It features 25 multimedia-equipped classrooms, two computer laboratories, a lecture hall, a moot court for pre-law students, a dedicated library, faculty offices, and a clinic.

The new building was officially inaugurated on November 13, 2024, deliberately timed to coincide with the 401st founding anniversary of Valenzuela City. The ribbon-cutting ceremony was led by Valenzuela Mayor Weslie T. Gatchalian and former Department of the Interior and Local Government (DILG) Secretary Benhur Abalos.

== Student life ==
PLV fosters a vibrant and disciplined student culture. The university regularly celebrates institutional milestones, including "First Day High" for incoming freshmen, the PLV Foundation Celebration, and the birth anniversary of Dr. Pio Valenzuela.

=== Student organizations ===
Extracurricular activities at PLV are regulated by the Office of Student Affairs (OSA). Students are highly encouraged to participate in recognized student organizations.

Academic and Non-Academic Organizations:

- Supreme Student Council (SSC)
- Association of Civil Engineering Students (ACES)
- Association of Electrical Engineering Students (AEES)
- Valenzuela Information Technology Society (VITS)
- Union of Public Administration Students (UPAS)
- PLV Junior Marketing Association (PLV-JMA)
- Junior Philippines Institute of Accountants (JPIA)
- Psychology Majors Student Organization (PMSO)
- Social Works Student Organization (SWSO)
- Group of Aspiring Mathematics Educators (GAME)
- Samahan ng mga Nagpapakadalubhasa sa Filipino (SADAFIL)
- Blue Pencil Society (BPS)
- Red Cross Youth (RCY) - PLV Chapter
- PLV Singers
- PLV Dance Company

== Symbols ==
The official color of the Pamantasan ng Lungsod ng Valenzuela is blue. The university's ideals and aspirations are deeply rooted in the PLV Hymn, which proudly refers to the institution and its students as the "hope of the nation" (Pag-asa ng bayan).

=== Suhay-Husay ===
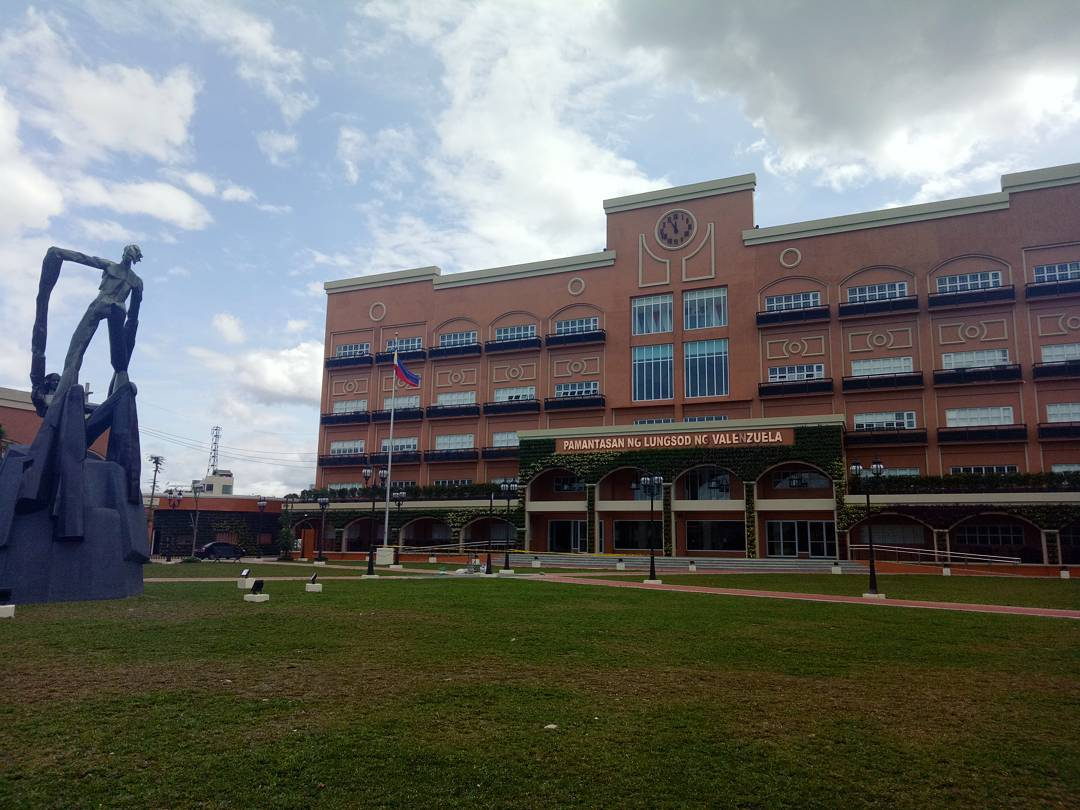
PLV campus in 2018. The Suhay-Husay sculpture by Eduardo Castrillo is shown on the left side.

A prominent cultural and artistic landmark of the university is the Suhay-Husay monument, located at the heart of the Maysan main campus. The metal sculpture was originally created in 1975 by the Filipino sculptor Eduardo Castrillo for the Philippine Broadcasting Service. After the broadcasting company relocated, the sculpture was left abandoned for decades in an open field, where it was colloquially referred to by locals as "Tinambak" (junk).

Recognizing its historical and artistic value, the Valenzuela city government had the sculpture meticulously restored in 2016. It was formally renamed Suhay-Husay, which translates to "Advocate of Excellence", and transferred to the newly built PLV campus to serve as its iconic central artwork. Today, it stands as a visual representation of the university's enduring commitment to academic excellence and resilience.

== Alumni ==
As an institution geared towards empowering the local populace, a vast majority of PLV alumni are integrated into Metro Manila's public and private sectors. The university is a primary feeder for Valenzuela City's local governance and basic education sectors, with many alumni serving in the local government units, the Department of Education (DepEd), and various corporate industries.

=== In popular culture ===
While relatively young compared to the historical universities of the capital, PLV has rapidly established itself as a cultural and academic cornerstone in northern Metro Manila. The university frequently serves as a premier venue for leadership summits, electoral debates, and public governance discourse, often drawing national political figures, senators, and department secretaries to speak at its state-of-the-art facilities.

== See also ==
- Valenzuela City Polytechnic College
- PLV Hymn on YouTube
