= Scola Guadalupana =

Private school in Bacolod, Philippines

Coordinates: 10°40′09″N 122°58′11″E

Scola Guadalupana (Scola La Salle) is a De La Salle-supervised private school in Capitol Heights Phase 2, Villamonte, Bacolod, Negros Occidental, Philippines run by the Philippine branch of the De La Salle Sisters of Guadalupe, a sister unit of the De La Salle Brothers.
