= Webometrics Ranking of World Universities =

Ranking system for the world's universities based on a composite indicator

The Webometrics Ranking of World Universities, also known as Ranking Web of Universities, is a ranking system for the world's universities based on a composite indicator that takes into account both the volume of the Web content (number of web pages and files) and the visibility and impact of these web publications according to the number of external inlinks (site citations) they received. The ranking is published by the Cybermetrics Lab, a research group of the Spanish National Research Council located in Madrid.

The aim of the ranking is to improve the presence of the academic and research institutions on the Web and to promote the open access publication of scientific results. The ranking started in 2004 and is updated every January and July. As of 2021 it provides Web indicators for more than 31,000 universities worldwide.

The Webometrics Ranking of Business Schools is a similar ranking of the world's Business Schools.

== Objectives ==
The Webometrics University Ranking is a ranking system based on university web presence, visibility and web access. This ranking system measures how strongly a university is present in the web by its own web domain, sub-pages, rich files, scholarly articles etc. The central hypothesis of this approach is that web presence is a reliable indicator of the global performance and prestige of the universities and as such, is an indirect way to measure all the university missions (teaching, research, transfer). Although the Web is universally recognized as one of the most relevant tools for scholarly communication, it is still very rare these indicators are used for the evaluation of the scientific research and the academic performance of universities. Webometric indicators are provided to show the commitment of the institutions to Web publication.

A research paper in the peer-reviewed scientific journal Scientometrics found "reasonable similarities" between the Webometrics rankings and other prominent university rankings despite using a very different set of features to determine each university's rank. These similarities were increased when the comparison was limited solely to European universities.

Top universities are publishing millions of pages produced by dozens of departments and services, hundreds of research teams and thousands of scholars. Strong web presence informs of a wide variety of factors that are clearly correlated with the global quality of the institution: widespread availability of computer resources available, global internet literacy, policies promoting democracy and freedom of speech, competition for international visibility or support of open access initiatives, among others.

== Impact ==
In Namibia, the Webometrics list is frequently used in public interaction, particularly with respect to the country's two main state-funded institutions of tertiary education, the University of Namibia and the Polytechnic of Namibia.

The 2009–2011 rankings have received significant press coverage and individual rankings have been published on the websites of universities in countries in the Middle East, East Asia, Europe, Canada and Africa.

The Webmometrics data were referred to as a reference point to achieve better online visibility and performance of higher education institutions.

== Structure and contents ==
There are pages for several regional Rankings:

- Universities. The main worldwide list of 30000 universities build from a catalog of various institutions is also offered as regional lists:

- USA & Canada
- Europe, including Turkey, Caucasus & Israel
  - Central & Eastern Europe
- Asia, excluding the Middle East
  - South East Asia
  - South Asia, Indian Subcontinent
- Arab & Persian World (North Africa & Middle East)
- Africa
- Latin America: Central, South America & Caribbean
- Oceania

== Authorship ==
The Webometrics Ranking is produced by the Cybermetrics Lab, a unit of the Spanish National Research Council (CSIC), the main public research body in Spain. The Lab acts as an Observatory of the Science and Technology on the Web. Isidro F. Aguillo is the head of the Laboratory and the editor-in-chief of the Rankings.

== Incident Involving Fraudulent Websites (2026) ==
In May 2026, University World News reported on fraudulent websites that mimicked the official Webometrics ranking site (webometrics.info) using alternative URL extensions such as ‘.org’, ‘.com’, and ‘.online’.

== Notes and references ==
- Rankings by Webometrics in this article are licensed CC-BY 2.5 which permits reuse under the Creative Commons Attribution-ShareAlike 3.0 Unported License. All relevant terms must be followed.
