= Benildus Romançon =

French Roman Catholic saint

St. Benildus Romançon, F.S.C.

Religious and educator
- Born: Pierre Romançon; 14 June 1805; Thuret, Puy-de-Dôme, French Republic
- Died: 13 August 1862 (aged 57); Saugues, Haute-Loire, France
- Venerated in: Roman Catholic Church (Institute of the Brothers of the Christian Schools)
- Beatified: 4 April 1948, Vatican City, by Pope Pius XII
- Canonized: 29 October 1967, Vatican City, by Pope Paul VI
- Major shrine: Church of Saint-Médard; Saugues, Haute-Loire, France
- Feast: 13 August

Benildus Romançon, F.S.C. (French: Bénilde; born Pierre Romançon; 14 June 1805 – 13 August 1862) was a French schoolteacher and member of the Brothers of the Christian Schools (De La Salle Brothers) who was declared a saint by the Catholic Church in 1967. His feast day is 13 August.

== Life ==
He was born Pierre Romançon on 14 June 1805, in the town of Thuret, Puy-de-Dôme, in France to a farming family. A small and frail-looking boy, he was not cut out physically to be a farmer, but his enrollment in a Christian Brothers school at Riom led him to his calling as a teacher. He was so far ahead of his classmates in elementary school that when he was only 14 years old the Brothers often assigned him as a substitute teacher.

He joined the Brothers in 1820 and served at several Brothers' schools in south-central France. In 1841 he was appointed Director of a school in Saugues, an isolated village on a barren plateau in southern France. For the next twenty years he worked quietly and effectively as teacher and principal to educate the boys in the village and some from the neighboring farms, many of whom were in their teens and had never been to school before.

Small as he was, he was known as a strict but fair disciplinarian. He also looked after his students by preparing meals in the Brothers' kitchen for hungry students, converting old Brothers' robes into coats or pants for them, and spending hours tutoring students who learned more slowly than others. He referred to all students, regardless of age or background, as "Monsieur."

In time the little school became the center of the social and intellectual life of the village, with evening classes for the adults and tutoring for the less gifted students. Brother Benilde's religious aptitude was evident to everyone: at Mass with the students in the parish church, teaching catechism, preparing boys for first communion, visiting and praying with the sick, and rumors of near-miraculous cures. He was especially effective in attracting religious vocations. At his death, on 13 August 1862, more than 200 Brothers and a large number of priests had been his students at Saugues.

== Veneration ==
Benildus was beatified on 4 April 1948 by Pope Pius XII, who mentioned that his sanctification was attained by enduring "the terrible daily grind" and by "doing common things in an uncommon way". He was canonized by Pope Paul VI on 29 October 1967, becoming the first Brother of the Institute to be canonized and the second saint after Jean Baptiste de La Salle.

A shrine was built in the parish church of Saint-Médard in Saugues to honor his remains. The Rue Saint-Benilde in his birthplace of Thuret is named after him, as is the Place Saint-Benilde in Riom.

St Benildus is one of four House Patrons at La Salle Catholic College, Bankstown, New South Wales. He is a patron of teachers.

=== Educational institutions named after Saint Benilde ===
- De La Salle–College of Saint Benilde – Manila, Philippines
- St. Benilde School – Bacolod, Philippines
- St. Benilde School – Louisiana, United States
- Benilde-St. Margaret's School – St Louis Park, Minnesota, US
- St Benildus College Dublin, Ireland
- Saint Benilde International School
- School of Saint Brother Benilde
- St. Benild School Sliema, Malta
- College of San Benildo - Rizal, Philippines
