= Bacolod Christian College of Negros =

Christian college in Bacolod, Philippines

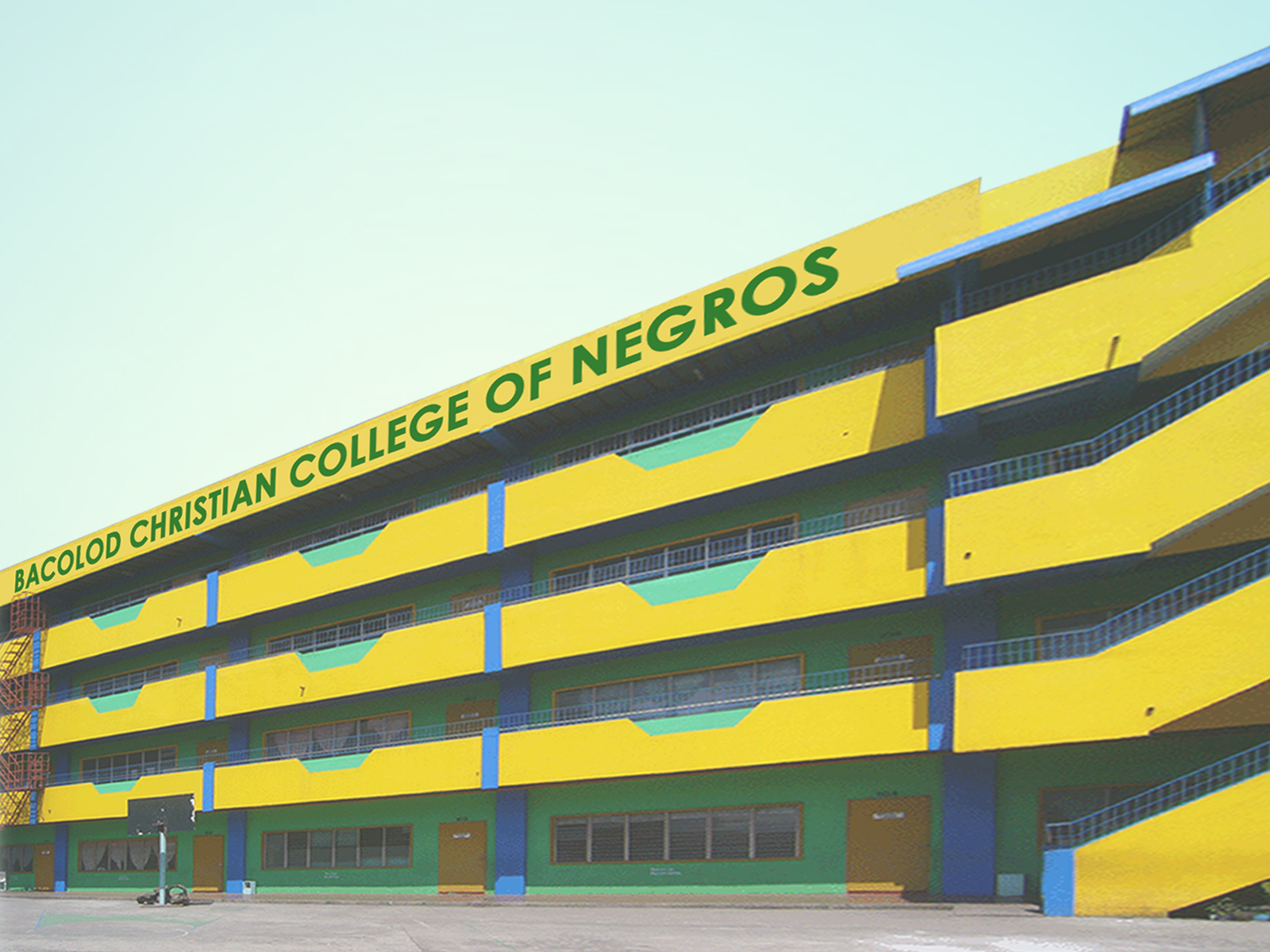
- BCCN Coggins Building
- Former names: Bacolod Christian Center (BCC); Bacolod Christian Education Center School (BCECS)
- Motto: "To provide quality Christian education, and transformational services based on the Gospel of Jesus Christ."
- Type: Private, Coeducational
- Established: 1954
- Religious affiliation: Baptist
- Chairman: Rev. Arsenio G. Llamas, Jr.
- President: Rev. Dr. Armando S. Kole
- Principal: Mrs. Susie M. Padilla, OIC
- Location: Bacolod, Negros Occidental, Philippines; 10°40′6″N 122°56′38″E
- Nickname: Archangels
- Website: www.bccn.isms.ph

- Location in the Visayas Location in the Philippines

The Bacolod Christian College of Negros, Inc. (BCCN), formerly known as the Bacolod Christian Center or BCC, is a Baptist pre-school established in Bacolod, Negros Occidental, Philippines.

== History ==
It was founded on February 23, 1954, as a community center and pioneer Baptist pre-school. Initially, the BCC offered a kindergarten, a game room, a basketball court, a small library, and a Bible class. Because of the need for workers in the Kasapulanan, the Christian Workers Training School (CWTS) gradually came into being. This was eventually merged with Convention Baptist Institute (CBI) and later became known as Convention Baptist Bible College (CBBC).

After Rev. Taylor and Catherine Neely left in 1957, Helen Markos took over in March 1957 as executive director. It was under her leadership that the center's program was molded to form the basis for future advancement. After Markos, Rev. Glenn Boice took over but later focused his attention on the Convention Bible Institute (CBI).

In 1959, Rev. Harold Blatt became the acting director; Henrietta Agustin (now Henrietta A. Nolido) joined the staff as his assistant. Upon the return of Blatt and his family to the United States in 1962, Nolido was appointed as executive director, a position she held until 1995.

Meanwhile, BCC was administered by officer-in-charge Racquel Alejo until Pastor Edwin Madlangbayan was appointed executive director in May 1996 until December 18, 2004. In school year 1994–1995, BCC commenced its elementary school; seven years later its secondary education department was opened. In March 2004, BCC graduated its first batch of high school students. In 1996, Mrs. Amparo Montalvo was designated as principal of the school until 2004.

On February 15, 2006, after a unanimous resolution passed by the board of trustees, Rev. Dr. Sergio A. Rojo Jr. was appointed as the new executive director of Bacolod Christian Center.

In March 2007, after the approval by the Securities and Exchange Commission, Bacolod Christian Center changed its name to Bacolod Christian College of Negros, Inc.

It offers pre-elementary, elementary, high school (junior and senior high), and college education. In SY 2007–2008, the student population reached 1,090.
