= St. Benilde School =

Roman Catholic school in Bacolod, Philippines

St. Benilde School, Inc.

Location
- Lasalleville, Mansilingan, Bacolod; Negros Occidental, Philippines
- Coordinates: 10°37′18″N 122°57′55″E

Information
- Other name: Saint Benilde School
- Former names: St. Benilde School - La Salle; St. Benilde Integrated School
- Type: Private, non-stock, co-educational, Catholic Lasallian Institution
- Motto: Fides (Latin) (Faith)
- Religious affiliation: Roman Catholic (De La Salle)
- Patron saints: St. Bénilde Romancon and St. John Baptist de La Salle
- Established: 1987; 39 years ago
- Founder: Br. Rolando Dizon, FSC
- President: Br. Narciso Erguiza FSC
- Grades: Primary–Year 10
- Gender: Coeducational
- Campus: Urban
- Colors: Green, Black, and White
- Athletics conference: NOPSSCEA
- Mascot: Archers
- Nickname: Benildean/Lasallian
- Accreditation: LASSAI, DLSP
- Publication: St. Benilde CHIMES
- Hymn: Lasallian Alma Mater Hymn
- Website: benilde-lms.com

St. Benilde School, officially St. Benilde School, Inc. or colloquially known simply as Benilde, is a Private Catholic High school and Elementary school in Lasalleville, Mansilingan, Bacolod, Philippines. It is one of the Lasallian educational institutions in the country. Benilde underwent through the supervision of University of St. La Salle and the De La Salle Brothers, and is now a member of Association of Lasallian Affiliated Schools (ALAS), a network of Lasallian private schools. The school serves the community of students from neighboring subdivisions such as Lasalleville, St. Benilde Homes, Grandville, Hillside, Forest Hills, and Regent Pearl. It was founded as a La Salle School by Br. Rolando Dizon FSC, a past President of De La Salle University, Manila, in 1987.

== History & Objectives ==
Saint Bénilde Romançon was selected as the name and patron saint to symbolize its objective of providing the students the legacy of "Doing ordinary things, extra-ordinarily well". The school was founded on 1987 by the former DLSU - Manila President Br. Rolando Dizon, FSC. In 2012, the school claimed its independence from the supervision of University of St. La Salle and has been a certified Lasallian school.

== Campus ==
Br. Dizon FSC Activity Center, the school gymnasium in the honor of the school founder, Br. Rolando Dizon, FSC.

=== Elementary School, Intermediate School, and High School ===
The elementary and intermediate are in the right wing of the building while junior high school is in the left wing. Because of the small population of the school, there is only one sector per year level in elementary, intermediate, and high school; each sector was named after the De La Salle Saints, Martyrs, and Blesseds.

Years and Sectors:

- Year 1: Blessed Br. Julian Reche
- Year 2: Blessed Br. Jean Bernard
- Year 3: St. Solomon
- Year 4: St. Mutien Marie
- Year 5: St. Jaime Hilario
- Year 6: St. Miguel Febres
- Year 7: Blessed Br. Cirilo-Bertran
- Year 8: Blessed Br. Benito De Jesus
- Year 9: Blessed Br. Julian Alfredo
- Year 10: Blessed Br. Aniceto Adolfo

== Benilde Student Life ==
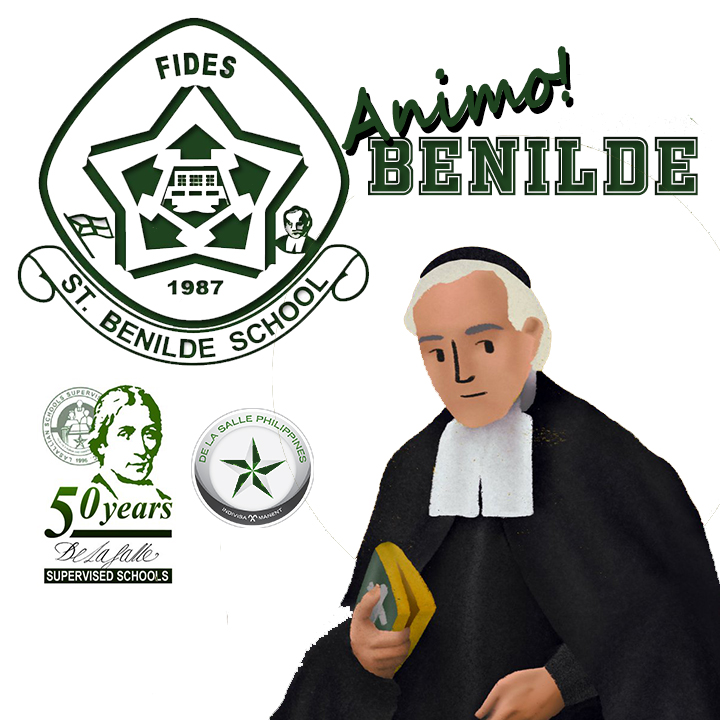

Benilde offers organizations, as well as athletics. The athletics program includes varsity football, basketball, volleyball, table tennis, and chess. School organizations includes the Student Affairs Council (SAC), Campus Peer Ministry (CPM), CPM Choir, and St. Benilde CHIMES: The official school publication of St. Benilde. The school also offer Junior Police Unit (JPU), the disciplinary program for Year 8 to Year 10 in secondary school.

== Lasallian sister schools ==
- De La Salle University
- De La Salle - College of Saint Benilde
- La Salle Greenhills
- De La Salle Araneta University
- De La Salle Santiago Zobel School
- University of Saint La Salle
- St. Joseph School-La Salle
