= Pamantasan =

Filipino word

Pamantasan is a Filipino word, which translates to university in the English language. Several local universities (or universities funded by municipal or city government) in the Philippines are called Pamantasan.

In 1965, Pamantasan ng Lungsod ng Maynila, the first Philippine university funded by a municipal government, was founded. It is also the same educational institution to have first used the term Pamantasan as part of its official name.

Other municipalities and cities emulated the PLM, but it was only after the approval and subsequent implementation of the Local Government Code (R.A. 7160) in 1991 that it became feasible for them to establish their own community or local university. At present, the PLM, being considered as one of the top five universities in the Philippines, are in consortium with other locally funded educational institutions to help them in their curricular offerings and academic programs. The President of PLM, Atty. Adel A. Tamano is also the President the Association of Local Colleges and Universities.

== List of Pamantasan-named universities ==
- Pamantasan ng Bayan ng San Mateo
- Pamantasan ng Cabuyao
- Pamantasan ng Lungsod ng Marikina
- Pamantasan ng Lungsod ng Maynila
- Pamantasan ng Montalban
- Pamantasan ng Lungsod ng Muntinlupa
- Pamantasan ng Lungsod ng Pasig
- Pamantasan ng Lungsod ng Valenzuela
