= College of Arts and Sciences of Asia and the Pacific =

Private college in Metro Manila, Philippines

College of Arts & Sciences of Asia & the Pacific
- Dalubhasaan ng Sining at Agham ng Asya at Pasipiko; Colegio de Artes y Ciencias de Asia y el Pacífico
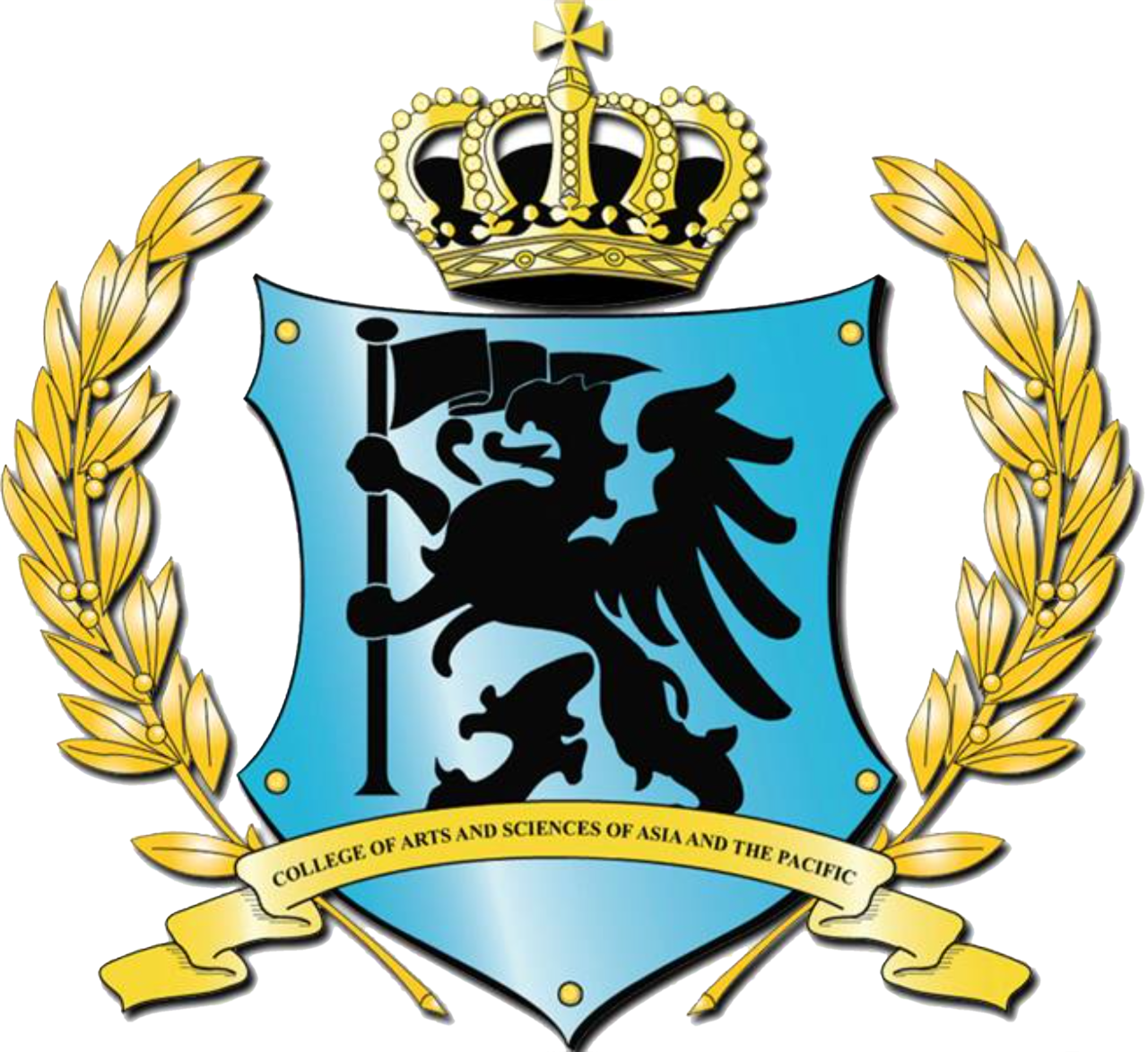
- Type: Private, co-educational, nonsectarian
- Established: 2010
- Founders: Lourdes C. Fernando
- Location: Philippines (various locations nationwide)
- Campus: Pasig Taytay, Rizal Bacolod Rodriguez, Rizal Marikina Quezon City
- Demonym: CASAPians
- Colors: Blue, yellow & gray
- Mascot: Griffin
- Website: www.casap.edu.ph
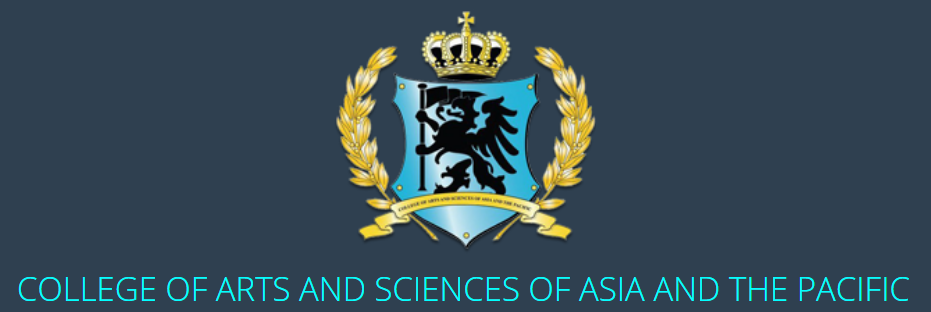

The College of Arts and Sciences of Asia and the Pacific (CASAP) (stylized as "College of Arts & Sciences of Asia & the Pacific"; Filipino: Dalubhasaan ng Sining at Agham ng Asya at Pasipiko) is a private educational institution in the Philippines. It has six separate campuses nationwide.

CASAP is recognized by the Technical Education and Skills Development Authority (TESDA), the Commission on Higher Education (CHED), and the Department of Education (DepEd).

== Campuses ==
- College of Arts & Sciences of Asia & the Pacific – Pasig Campus (Marcos Highway, Santolan, Pasig)
- College of Arts & Sciences of Asia & the Pacific – Taytay Campus (JEM Bldg., Rizal Ave., Taytay, Rizal)
- College of Arts & Sciences of Asia & the Pacific – Bacolod Campus (Brgy. 35, Bacolod – College and Senior High)
- College of Arts & Sciences of Asia & the Pacific – Rodriguez Campus (Brgy. San Jose, Rodriguez, Rizal)
- College of Arts & Sciences of Asia & the Pacific – Marikina Campus (128 East Drive Cor. Santan St., Brgy. Fortune, Marikina)
- College of Arts & Sciences of Asia & the Pacific – Quezon City Campus (#1 Villongco St., Commonwealth Drive, Quezon City)

== Gallery ==
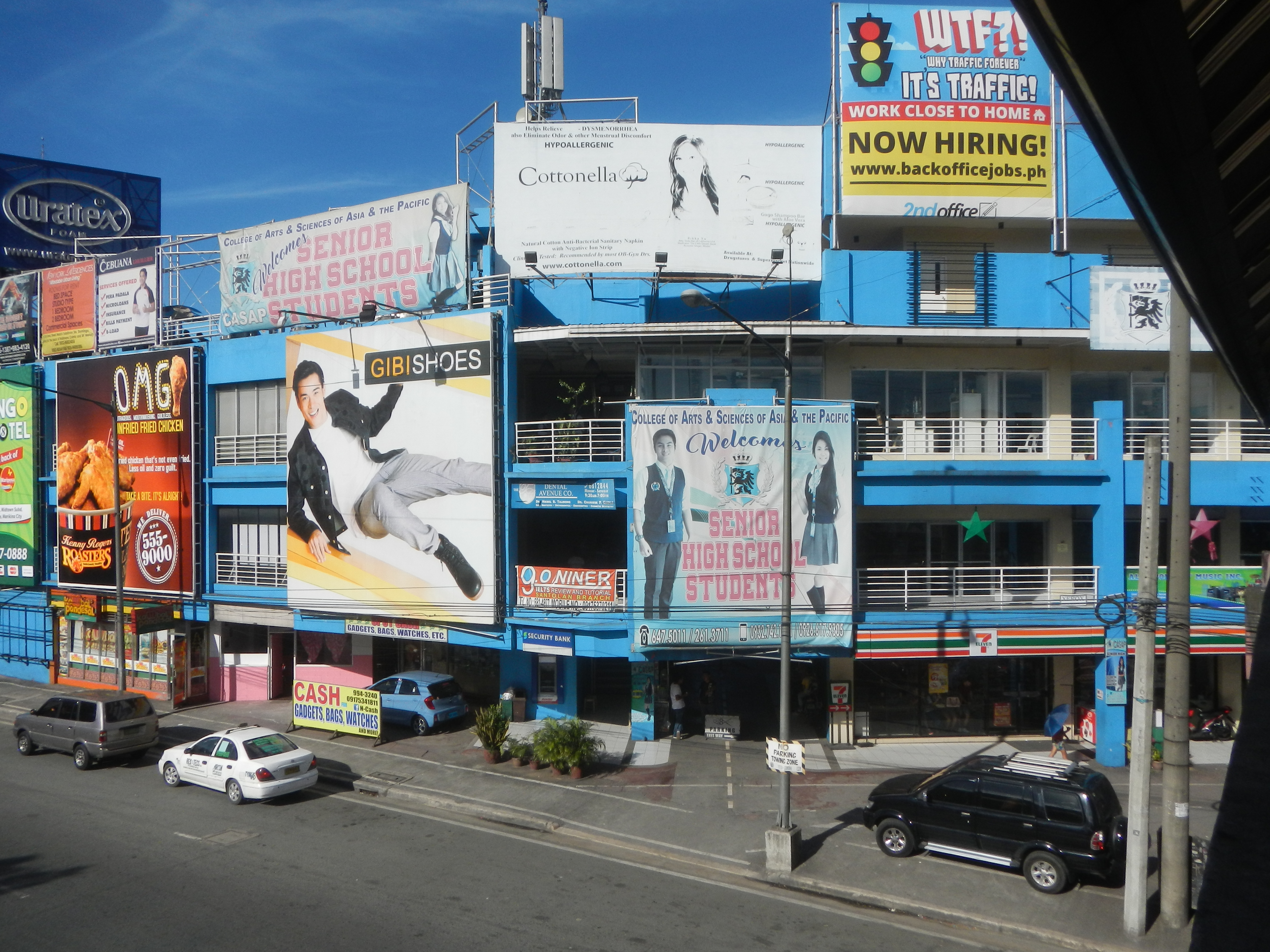
CASAP Pasig Campus

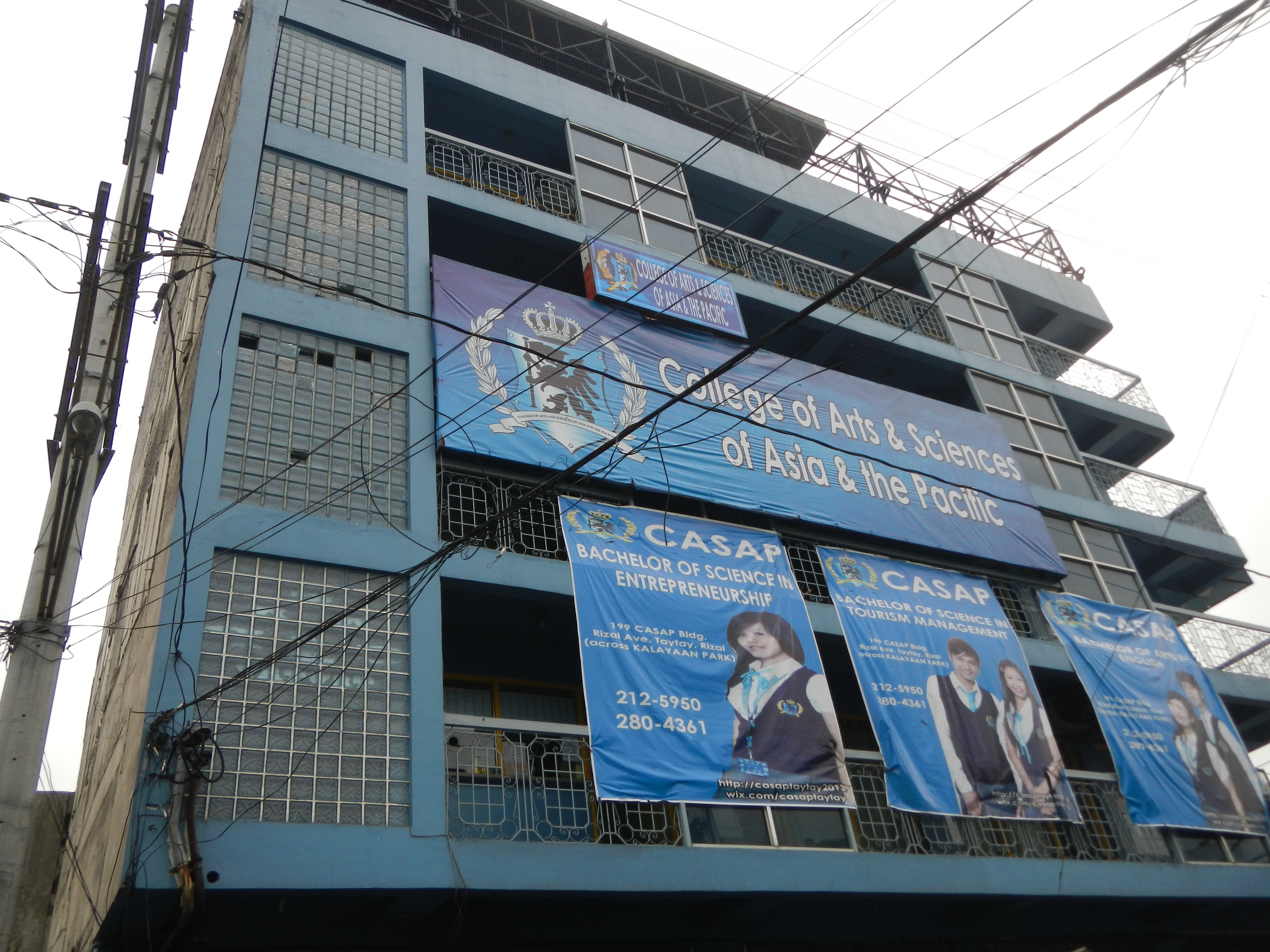
CASAP Taytay Campus
