= Cybermetrics Lab =

The Cybermetrics Lab is a research group of the Spanish National Research Council (CSIC). The organization is responsible for editing the Webometrics Ranking of World Universities. Currently more than 48,000 web domains of academic and research organizations are analyzed and are ranked according to their web presence and link visibility.

The Cybermetrics Lab started to design and compile web indicators in the mid 1990s, editing the first CSIC electronic journal, Cybermetrics, in 1996. Originally part of the National Documentation Center (IEDCYT, now extinct), the group is now located in the new facilities of the CSIC for the Humanities and Social Sciences in Madrid. The head of the group is Isidro F. Aguillo.

Major contributions of the group include the analysis of academic world and regional webpages, the discovery of a digital divide between North American and European top universities, and the development of new statistics for Open Access repositories.

== Rankings web ==
1. Universities (since 2004)
2. Research Centers (since 2006)
3. Hospitals (since 2008).
4. Repositories (since 2008)
5. Business Schools (since 2008)

== EU funded research projects ==
1. EICSTES European Indicators, Cyberspace and the Science-Technology-Economy System
2. WISER Web Indicatorsfor Scientific, Technology and innovation Research
3. ACUMEN Academic Careers Understood Through Measurement and Norms
4. OpenAIRE Open Access Infrastructure for Research in Europe
