= Riverside College (Philippines) =

Private college in Bacolod, Philippines

Riverside College, Inc.
- Dalubhasaang Riverside (Filipino)
- Motto: Lux et Caritas (Latin)
- Motto in English: Light and Charity
- Type: Private nonsectarian coeducational Senior High School and higher education institution
- Established: School – 1961
- President: Samuel Z. Lee, MBM
- Location: B.S. Aquino Drive, Bacolod, Negros Occidental, Philippines; 10°41′00″N 122°57′34″E
- Sporting affiliations: NOPSSCEA
- Website: www.riverside.edu.ph
- Location in the Visayas Location in the Philippines

Riverside College, Inc., also referred to by its acronym RCI, is a private non-sectarian coeducational higher education institution in Bacolod, Negros Occidental, Philippines. The college is owned and operated by Metro Pacific Health - the largest private hospital group in the Philippines and part of the MVP Group of Companies. It is notable for being the first school affiliated with a teaching hospital in Bacolod City. It offers education programs from senior high school, college, graduate school, and vocational school. To date, it remains to be the biggest allied health college in Negros Occidental with college courses raging from Nursing, Radiologic Technology, Physical Therapy, Pharmacy, Medical Technology, and Psychology. The college also expanded by providing Business Administration and Entrepreneurship in its college offerings. It offers Master in Nursing in their graduate school and the college offers the only TESDA Accredited Live-in Caregiving Program in Bacolod City.

== History ==
Pablo O. Torre, Sr., a doctor, began his practice in a family clinic in Bacolod. The clinic expanded, later becoming the Riverside General Hospital, and Torre invited Carmelite nuns to assist in administering the facility. Four nuns joined the hospital in 1957 – Mother Superior Margaret Theresa and Sisters Regina Javier, Maria Isabelle Gregorio and Cristina Dean. Recognizing the need for competent staff to run the hospital, Torre established Riverside College, initially offering the School of Midwifery on June 11, 1961, and the School of Nursing on June 23, 1963. Riverside General Hospital became a teaching hospital for nurses.

In 1972, the hospital was renamed to Riverside Medical Center. Later, it was again renamed after its founder, becoming the Dr. Pablo O. Torre Memorial Hospital, albeit the name of its parent company retained its name as The Riverside Medical Center, Inc. Riverside College, Inc. has also retained its name in reference to the hospital's original name.

Both The Riverside Medical Center, Inc. and Riverside College, Inc. are operated and managed by Metro Pacific Hospital Holdings, Inc.

== See also ==
- List of tertiary schools in Bacolod
