= Iskoolmates =

Youth-oriented magazine and debate program

- Title card
- Genre: Youth Oriented
- Created by: PTV Public Affairs
- Written by: Maryfaye Arnaiz, Gericho Lagunsad and John Edmar Pineda
- Directed by: Pedro Sicat
- Opening theme: "Tinig, Kabataan" by Isabela Edel Mendez and Darl Alba
- Country of origin: Philippines
- Original languages: Filipino; English
- No. of seasons: 46
- No. of episodes: 345

Production
- Executive producer: Frederick Aquino
- Editor: Jhay Mark Pineda
- Camera setup: Multi-camera setup
- Running time: 60 minutes
- Production companies: People's Television Network, Inc. and Bagong Pilipinas Studios

Original release
- Network: PTV
- Release: June 23, 2015 – present
- Network: IBC
- Release: February 11 – August 5, 2019

Related
- Sigaw: The Campus Debates (NBN 4, 2001)

Iskoolmates (transl. schoolmates) is a Philippine television public affairs debate show broadcast by PTV. Originally hosted by Jules Guiang, JV Cruz, Mico Aytona and Hessa Gonzales, it aired from June 23, 2015 to present. Tricia Bersano and James Ramada currently serve as the hosts.

The program gives voice to the ideas, concerns, and aspirations of Filipino students and young leaders across the country. With its fresh, relevant, and youth-driven content, the program creates a dynamic platform for civic engagement, social awareness, and open dialogue, tackling issues that matter to the new generation.

Also broadcast on IBC from February 11 to August 5, 2019.

== Year 1 Episodes ==
Ep	Date	School	Topic
1	June 23, 2015	University of Caloocan City	Removal of Filipino subject in College
2	June 30, 2015	University of Perpetual Help System DALTA	Is the Philippines ready for the K to 12 program?
3	July 7, 2015	University of Perpetual Help System DALTA	National Hero: Jose Rizal or Andres Bonifacio?
4	July 14, 2015	Saint Dominic Savio College	Lowering the Age of Criminal Liability to 12 years Old
5	July 21, 2015	Saint Dominic Savio College	Revival of Death Penalty Laws
6	July 28, 2015	Philippine Normal University	Same Sex Marriage
7	August 4. 2015	Philippine Normal University	Corporal Punishment
8	August 11, 2015	Collegio de San Lorenzo	Sex Education
9	August 18, 2015	Collegio de San Lorenzo	Divorce in the Philippines
10	August 25, 2015	Pamantasan ng Lungsod ng Maynila	Ecological Preservation vs. Commercialism
11	September 1, 2015	Pamantasan ng Lungsod ng Maynila	Abolishing Sangguniang Kabataan
12	September 8, 2015	Various Schools	Season Ender Special Part 1
13	September 15, 2015	Various Schools	Season Ender Special Part 2
14	September 22, 2015	FEU Diliman	Separation of Church and State
15	September 29, 2015	FEU Diliman	Automated or Manual Elections
16	October 6, 2015	Colegio de San Juan de Letran	Academic Calendar Shift of Colleges
17	October 18, 2015	Colegio de San Juan de Letran	Is Competitive Gaming a Legitimate Sport?
18	October 25, 2015	Miriam College	Should Parents be also held Liable for Bullying in Schools?
19	November 1, 2015	Miriam College	Term Limits for Government Leaders
20	November 15, 2015	Lyceum of the Philippines University	Should it be Mandatory for Election Candidates to join Public Debates?
21	November 29, 2015	Lyceum of the Philippines University	Banning Fraternities and Sororities in Colleges and Universities
22	December 6, 2015	Quezon City Polytechnic University	Banning of Political Candidate with Criminal Record to Run in Election
23	December 13, 2015	Quezon City Polytechnic University	Freedom of Information Bill
24	December 20, 2015	Sitio Sampaloc, Zambales	Bangkarunungan
25	December 27, 2015	Various Schools	Year-End Special
26	January 3, 2016	San Beda College	ExtraJudicial Killings
27	January 10, 2016	San Beda College	Bail for Public Officials Charged with Corruption
28	January 24, 2016	University of the East	Peace Negotiation vs. All Out War
29	January 31, 2016	University of the East	Scrapping Age Limit for Job Applicants
30	February 7, 2016	Roosevelt College	Euthanasia
31	February 14, 2016	Roosevelt College	Marriage Before Live-in or Live-in Before Marriage
32	February 21, 2016	University of the Philippines Diliman	EDSA People Power Revolution
33	March 6, 2016	Pamantasan ng Lungsod ng Marikina	Sangguniang Kabataan Reforms
34	March 13, 2016	Pamantasan ng Lungsod ng Marikina	Death Penalty
35	March 27, 2016	Various Schools	Season Ender Special Part 1
36	April 3, 2016	Various Schools	Season Ender Special Part 2
37	April 24, 2016	Asian Development Bank	Philippine Inter-Collegiate Debating Championship
38	May 1, 2016	University of Santo Tomas	Centralized Public Transportation System
39	May 8, 2016	University of Santo Tomas	Mandatory Voting

== Year 2 Episodes ==
Ep	Date	School	Topic
40	July 10, 2016	Sitio San Ysiro, San Jose, Antipolo City	1st Anniversary Special
41	August 7, 2016	Rizal High School	Curfew
42	August 14, 2016	Rizal High School	Three Child Policy
43	August 21, 2016	Claret School of Quezon City	Contractualization
44	August 28, 2016	Claret School of Quezon City	Federal Government
45	September 4, 2016	Adamson University	Ferdinand Marcos Burial in Heroes Cemetery
46	September 11, 2016	Adamson University	Mandatory ROTC
47	September 18, 2016	Lyceum of the Philippines University	K to 12
48	September 25, 2016	Lyceum of the Philippines University	Civil Law for LGBT
49	October 2, 2016	FEU Diliman	Internet vs. Traditional Source of Information
50	October 9, 2016	FEU Diliman	Banning of Foreign Products
51	October 16, 2016	University of the East Ramon Magsaysay Memorial Medical Center	Privatization of Government Hospitals
52	October 23, 2016	Onesimo Bulilit Foundation	Bulilit Day
53	November 6, 2016	Tarlac State University	Marijuana Legalization
54	November 13, 2016	Tarlac State University	Mandatory School Uniform for State Universities and Colleges
55	November 20, 2016	Pamantasan ng Lungsod ng Muntinlupa	Mining in the Philippines
56	November 27, 2016	Pamantasan ng Lungsod ng Muntinlupa	Independent Foreign Policy
57	December 4, 2016	Polytechnic University of the Philippines	Legalization of Prostitution
58	December 11, 2016	Polytechnic University of the Philippines	Socio-Economic Status of Students in SUCs
59	January 23, 2017	Technological Institute of the Philippines	Lowering the Age of Criminal Liability to 9 years Old
60	January 30, 2017	Technological Institute of the Philippines	Abolition of Enhanced Defense Cooperation Agreement
61	February 12, 2017	Xavier School	Corporal Punishment
62	February 16, 2017	Xavier School	Two-Party System
63	March 16, 2017	Kalayaan College	The Taking in of Syrian Refugees
64	March 30, 2017	Kalayaan College	Tearing Down Monuments to Build Up Public Utilities
65	April 6, 2017	Siena College of Taytay	Minimum Age Limit for Job Applications should remain at 15
66	April 27, 2017	Siena College of Taytay	Political Service Exam for Aspiring Politicians
67	May 4, 2017	Philippine Christian University	Inclusion of Rape Case to Death Penalty
68	May 11, 2017	Philippine Christian University	Gender Expressions in Christian Universities

== Year 3 Episodes ==
Ep	Date	School	Topic
69	July 6, 2017	Pamantasan ng Lungsod ng Pasig	Sex Education in Primary and Secondary Schools
70	July 13, 2017	Pamantasan ng Lungsod ng Pasig	Beauty Pageants: Empowerment or Objectification of Women?
71	August 17, 2017	Rizal Technological University Mandaluyong	Reopening of Bataan Nuclear Power Plant
72	August 31, 2017	Rizal Technological University Mandaluyong	Tax Reform Bill: Pro-Poor or Anti-Poor?
73	September 7, 2017	La Consolacion College Manila	Commercialism Vs. Environmentalism
74	September 14, 2017	La Consolacion College Manila	Banning of Foreign Products
75	September 21, 2017	Jose Rizal University	War on Drugs
76	September 28, 2017	Jose Rizal University	Public Shaming Through Social Media: Human Rights Violation or Social Surveillance
77	October 5, 2017	City University of Pasay	Modernization of PUJs
78	October 12, 2017	City University of Pasay	Inclusion of Foreign Language in High School Curriculum
79	October 26, 2017	Our Lady of Fatima University	Banning of Educational Tours
80	November 2, 2017	De La Salle Araneta University	Mandatory Organ Donation After Death
81	November 9, 2017	Our Lady of Fatima University	Gender-Neutral Comfort Rooms in Public and Private Establishments
82	November 30, 2017	Emilio Aguinaldo College	Social Media: Constructive or Destructive to Personal Relationships
83	December 7, 2017	Emilio Aguinaldo College	Legalization of Dissolution of Marriage
84	December 28, 2017	Various Schools	Year-End Special
85	January 25, 2018	Rizal Technological University Pasig	Federalism in the Philippines
86	February 1, 2018	Rizal Technological University Pasig	Political Service Exam for Aspiring Politicians
87	February 8, 2018	Southville International School and Colleges	Is Tourism a Threat to Natural Wonders of the World
88	February 15, 2018	Southville International School and Colleges	Lowering the Age of Criminal Liability to 9 years Old
89	February 22, 2018	San Sebastian College Recoletos	Minimum Age Limit for Job Applications should remain at 15
90	March 1, 2018	San Sebastian College Recoletos	Should Parents be also held Liable for Bullying in Schools?
91	March 8, 2018	Pitogo High School	Tearing Down Monuments to Build Up Public Utilities
92	March 15, 2018	Pitogo High School	Mandatory ROTC
93	March 22, 2018	Pasig Catholic College	Abolish of Fraternities and Sororities
94	April 5, 2018	Pasig Catholic College	Religious Leader in Government Position
95	April 19, 2018	Siena College of Quezon City	Juvenile Justice Act
96	April 26, 2018	Siena College of Quezon City	Mandatory Drug Testing to Minors
97	May 3, 2018	National University	Marriage Before Live-in or Live-in Before Marriage
98	May 10, 2018	Barangay 176, Bagong Silang, Caloocan	Sangguniang Kabataan Special Edition
99	May 17, 2018	National University	Should Abolish Party-List System
100	June 21, 2018	Asian Development Bank	Philippine Inter-Collegiate Debating Championship

== Year 4 Episodes ==
Ep	Date	School	Topic
101	July 19, 2018	Batasan Hills National High School	Socio-Economic Status of Students in SUCs
102	July 26, 2018	Batasan Hills National High School	Privatization of Government Hospitals
103	August 2, 2018	Caloocan High School	Sex Education: Where to be taught, in School or at Home?
104	August 9, 2018	Caloocan High School	National Hero: Jose Rizal or Andres Bonifacio?
105	August 16, 2018	Rizal High School	Same Sex Marriage
106	August 30, 2018	Rizal High School	Legalization of Divorce
107	September 13, 2018	Commonwealth High School	Marijuana Legalization
108	September 20, 2018	Commonwealth High School	Legalization of Abortion for Rape Victims
109	September 27, 2018	Manila Central University	Mandatory Organ Donation After Death
110	October 4, 2018	Manila Central University	Should Animal Testing be Banned?
111	October 11, 2018	Pamantasan ng Lungsod ng Valenzuela	TRAIN Law: Pro Poor or Not?
112	October 18, 2018	Pamantasan ng Lungsod ng Valenzuela	Federalism in the Philippines
113	October 25, 2018	Lagro High School	Age Limit for Job Applications
114	November 6, 2018	Lagro High School	Legalization of Prostitution
115	November 15, 2018	Culiat High School	Corporal Punishment
116	November 22, 2018	Culiat High School	Lowering the Age of Criminal Liability to 13 years Old
117	November 27, 2018	Malabon National High School	Removal of Filipino Subject in College Curriculum
118	December 6, 2018	Malabon National High School	Mandatory Drug Testing to Minors
119	December 27, 2018	Various Schools	Year-End Special
120	January 3, 2019	Rizal Technological University Pasig	West Philippine Sea Dispute: Joint Development or Exclusive Ownership
121	January 10, 2019	Rizal Technological University Pasig	Globalization Vs. Nationalism: What Leads to Economic Prosperity?
122	January 24, 2019	Sauyo High School	Social Media: Constructive or Destructive to Personal Relationships
123	January 31, 2019	Sauyo High School	First Philippine President: Emilio Aguinaldo or Andres Bonifacio?
124	February 7, 2019	Siena College of Taytay	Lowering the Age of Criminal Liability to 12 years Old
125	February 14, 2019	Siena College of Taytay	Reopening of Bataan Nuclear Power Plant
126	February 21, 2019	Far Eastern University	National ID System
127	February 28, 2019	Far Eastern University	Two-Party System
128	March 7, 2019	Buting Senior High School	Mandatory HIV Testing in High School
129	March 14, 2019	Buting Senior High School	Beauty Pageants: Empowerment or Objectification of Women?
130	March 28, 2019	College of San Benildo Rizal	Mandatory Vaccination in Public Schools
131	April 11, 2019	College of San Benildo Rizal	Should it be Mandatory for Election Candidates to join Public Debates?

== Year 5 Episodes ==
Ep	Date	School	Topic
132	July 4, 2019	Pinagbuhatan High School	Abolishing Sangguniang Kabataan
133	July 11, 2019	Pinagbuhatan High School	Probihiting the Use of Social Media in School Projects
134	August 15, 2019	Tandang Sora National High School	Mandatory ROTC in Senior High School
135	August 22, 2019	Tandang Sora National High School	Should Parents be also held Liable for Bullying in Schools?
136	September 12, 2019	Francisco P. Felix Memorial National High School	Whose Job is to Regulate Violent Video Games, Game-makers or Parents?
137	September 26, 2019	Francisco P. Felix Memorial National High School	Revival of Death Penalty Laws
138	October 3, 2019	Immaculate Heart of Mary Parañaque	No Homework Policy from Kindergarten to High School
139	October 10, 2019	Immaculate Heart of Mary Parañaque	Should Transgender individuals be allowed to use their preferred bathroom?
140	October 24, 2019	San Beda University	Lowering the Age of Criminal Responsibility to 12 yrs. Old
141	October 31, 2019	San Beda University	Total Plastic Ban in the Philippines
142	November 14, 2019	Rizal Technological University Pasig	Legalization of Sexual Orientation and Gender Identity Expression Bill
143	November 28, 2019	Rizal Technological University Pasig	Mandatory Bible Reading in Schools
144	December 12, 2019	Deparo High School	Good Manners and Right Conduct in Schools
145	December 19, 2019	Deparo High School	Cellphone in Schools
146	December 26, 2019	Various Schools	Year-End Special
147	January 30, 2020	Eugenio M. Lopez Jr. Center for Media Arts Senior High School	State Funded Arts
148	February 6, 2020	Eugenio M. Lopez Jr. Center for Media Arts Senior High School	Media Censorship
149	February 20, 2020	Technological Institute of the Philippines Quezon City	Abolition of Pantawid Pamilyang Pilipino Program
150	February 27, 2020	Technological Institute of the Philippines Quezon City	Religion: Does It More Harm or Good
151	March 12, 2020	De La Salle Araneta University	Animal Euthanasia
152	March 19, 2020	De La Salle Araneta University	Political Service Exam to Aspiring Politicians
153	May 7, 2020	San Beda University	Online Classes in College
154	May 14, 2020	San Beda University and Lyceum of the Philippines University	Mass Promotion of College Students
155	May 21, 2020	Rizal Technological University Pasig and San Beda University	Declaring a Climate Emergency
156	May 28, 2020	San Beda University and Lyceum of the Philippines University	Mass Promotion of College Students

== Year 6 Episodes ==
Ep	Date	School	Topic
157	June 25, 2020	Ateneo De Davao and Lyceum of the Philippines University	Anti-Terrorism Bill
158	July 3, 2020	University of the Philippines Manila and Rizal Technological University Pasig	Parent Liability to Children in Conflict with Cyberbullying
159	July 10, 2020	Philippine Science High School	Jeepneys Modernization
160	July 24, 2020	Pamantasan ng Lungsod ng Maynila	Call Out and Cancel Culture Online
161	August 6, 2020	Philippine Science High School	Limited Face-to-Face Classes in Low Risk Areas
162	September 10, 2020	San Beda University Vs. University of the Philippines Diliman	Birth Control in Curriculum
163	September 17, 2020	Philippine Normal University	Revival of Death Penalty in the Philippines
164	September 24, 2020	Lyceum of the Philippines University	Baybayin in Public Places
165	October 1, 2020	University of the Philippines	Online Learning
166	October 8, 2020	Lyceum of the Philippines University	Manila Bay White Sand
167	October 15, 2020	Rizal Technological University Pasig	Urban Development of Ancestral Domains
168	October 29, 2020	University of the Philippine Baguio	Humanitarian Consideration for Persons Deprived of Liberty
169	November 5, 2020	Cagayan State University Vs. Polytechnic University of the Philippines	Civil Union for Same Sex Couples
170	November 12, 2020	University of La Sallete Vs. University of the Philippines Diliman	Mining in the Philippines
171	November 26, 2020	San Beda University Vs. Rizal Technological University Pasig	Beauty Pageants and Women Empowerment
172	December 3, 2020	San Beda University Vs. Rizal Technological University Pasig	Political Photo-Op
173	December 10, 2020	Lyceum of the Philippine University Vs. Rizal Technological University Pasig	Reopening of Philippine Tourism
174	December 17, 2020	Cagayan State University Vs. Cagayan State University	Full-Contact Competitive Sports
175	December 24, 2020	Department of Education	Christmas Special
176	December 31, 2020	Various Schools	Year-End Special
177	February 11, 2021		How to Maintain Romantic Long Distance Relationship?
178	February 18, 2021		How can we stop Victim Blaming?
179	February 25, 2021		Teenage Pregnancy
180	April 29, 2021		Community Pantries and Asian Hate Crimes
181	May 6, 2021		COVID-19 Vaccines and Colonial Mentality
182	May 27, 2021		Philippine Identification System

== Year 7 Episodes ==
Ep	Date	Topic
183	July 15, 2021	Organize New Malitias
184	July 22, 2021	Youth Mental Health / Abolish Licensure Exam / National Standard for Adobo
185	August 5, 2021	Disaster Preparedness and Management / Mobile Number Portability Act / Pinoy Athlete in Tokyo Olympics
186	August 12, 2021	International Youth Day / Enhanced Community Quarantine / Buwan ng Wikang Filipino
187	August 19, 2021	54th ASEAN Anniversary / Nas Daily-Wang Od Controversy / Sexism in Sports
188	August 26, 2021	Belo Ads Controversy / Online Selling
189	September 9, 2021	Voters Registration Campaign
190	September 16, 2021	National Teachers' Month / Creator and Influencer Council of the Philippines / Boys Love Series
191	September 23, 2021	BFP Modernization Program
192	September 30, 2021	End Child Rape Bill
193	October 14, 2021	Influences of Internet Content Creators on Elections
194	October 21, 2021	The Youth and Elections Part1
195	October 28, 2021	The Youth and Elections Part2
196	November 11, 2021	Philippines: Asia's Leading Dive and Beach Destination / Should The Private Lives Of Famous People Be Off Limits
197	November 18, 2021	Drug Testing for Electoral Candidate
198	November 25, 2021	National Children's and Values Month
199	December 9, 2021	National Privacy Commission / CHED on Face-to-Face Classes in All Degrees in Low Risk Areas
200	December 16, 2021	Mandatory COVID-19 Vaccination for Onsite Workers / Mandatory Playing of Filipino Music in Hotels, Resorts, Tourist Buses, International Flights
201	December 23, 2021	Christmas Special
202	December 30, 2021	Year-End Special
203	January 20, 2022	COVID-19 Omicron Variant / Restrictions on the Unvaccinated
204	January 27, 2022	A Call for Government Action Plan to Adapt to the Changing Climate
205	February 3, 2022	Mandatory Military Service / World Cancer Day
206	February 10, 2022	Love Month
207	February 17, 2022	Pediatric Vaccination / National Arts Month
208	February 24, 2022	Mandatory Public Debate for Political Candidates
209	March 3, 2022	Russia-Ukraine Crisis
210	March 10, 2022	Russia-Ukraine War: Implications for the Philippines
211	March 17, 2022	Youth on Political Campaigns
212	March 31, 2022	National Women's Month
213	April 7, 2022	Philippine Veterans Week
214	April 21, 2022	Where Are We on Education Recovery?
215	April 28, 2022	Philippine History in Basic Education
216	May 5, 2022	Celebrity Endorsement in Philippine Elections
217	June 2, 2022	Educational Reform
218	June 9, 2022	Philippine Agriculture / Young Agripreneur
219	June 16, 2022	Vloggers Accreditation for Palace Coverage

== Year 8 Episodes ==
Ep	Date	School	Topic
220	June 30, 2022		7th Anniversary Special / LGBTQ+ Rights in the Philippines
221	August 11, 2022		International Youth Day, Brigada Eskwela and ASEAN Day Celebration
222	August 18, 2022		Endangered Languages in the Philippines
223	August 25, 2022		Face-to-Face Classes in the Philippines
224	September 8, 2022		Philippine Crime Rate
225	September 15, 2022		Education Guidelines and Policies
226	September 22, 2022		Culture and the Arts
227	October 6, 2022		SK Elections Postponement and Climate Change
228	October 13, 2022		Youth Empowerment
229	October 20, 2022		SIM Card Registration Act and Indigenous Peoples Month
230	October 27, 2022		Fake News and Disinformation
231	November 3, 2022		Emerging Trends and Issues in the Local Film Industry
232	November 17, 2022		Promoting Professionalism in Education
233	November 24, 2022		National Children's Month
234	December 8, 2022		Environmental Awareness
235	March 2, 2023		Paid Subscription Service for Facebook and Instagram / HeARTwork / Agri-Education
236	March 9, 2023		Gen Z Aspirations and the K to 12 Curriculum
237	March 16, 2023		Most Talked About Debate Issues (Legalization of Same Sex Marriage / Revival of Death Penalty / Legalization of Divorce)
238	March 23, 2023	National Teachers College	Forda Cancelledt ba ang Cancel Culture?
239	March 30, 2023	National Teachers College	Pinoy Pride pa ba or Pinoy Validity na?
240	April 13, 2023		Cancel Culture and Pinoy Pride
241	May 18, 2023		UnFEELtered: The Unspoken Truth about Mental Health
242	May 25, 2023		HIV and AIDS Awareness
243	June 8, 2023		Dealing with Body Shaming

== Year 9 Episodes ==
Ep	Date	School	Topic
244	July 6, 2023		Situationship Part 1
245	July 13, 2023		Situationship Part 2
246	July 20, 2023		Healing Inner Child Part 1
247	July 27, 2023		Healing Inner Child Part 2
248	August 10, 2023		Philippine Space Week / ASEAN Week / International Youth Day
249	August 24, 2023		Sangguniang Kabataan
250	August 31, 2023		Drag at the Art World
251	September 14, 2023		Generational Change
252	September 28, 2023		Parental Acceptance
253	October 19, 2023		Social Media Influencer as a Career Part 1
254	November 2, 2023		Social Media Influencer as a Career Part 2
255	November 9, 2023		Resiliency or Toxic Positivity?
256	November 23, 2023		Post Sangguniang Kabataan Elections
257	November 30, 2023		Bullying and other School Violence
258	December 21, 2023	Ramon Pascual Institute	Is AI a Threat to Education?
259	December 28, 2023	Ramon Pascual Institute	Is Cancel Culture Good for Society?
260	February 8, 2024	Francisco P. Felix Memorial National High School	Mental Health Subject in High School Curriculum
261	February 15, 2024	Francisco P. Felix Memorial National High School	Dress Code Policy in Schools
262	February 22, 2024		Exploring Gen Z Relationships
263	March 7, 2024	Pamantasan ng Lungsod ng Marikina Senior High School	Mandatory ROTC in Senior High School
264	March 14, 2024	Pamantasan ng Lungsod ng Marikina Senior High School	Legalization of Medical Cannabis
265	March 21, 2024	De La Salle Araneta University	Illegal Drug Use: Mental Health Issue or Criminal Offense?
266	April 4, 2024	De La Salle Araneta University	Should Zoos Be Stop Operating?
267	April 18, 2024		Classroom Discipline
268	April 25, 2024		Prank Culture
269	May 9, 2024		Generational Difference
270	May 23, 2024		Generational Trauma
271	June 6, 2024		Pop Culture
272	June 13, 2024		Independence Day through the Eyes of Gen Z

== Year 10 Episodes ==
Ep	Date	Topic
273	June 27, 2024	Gen Z Career Path
274	July 11, 2024	Choosing a Course and School in College
275	August 8, 2024	How to Survive First Day of School
276	August 22, 2024	Youth Empowerment Through Sports
277	September 19, 2024	Onsite, Remote or Hybrid: Which Work Setup Suits in future Workforce?
278	October 3, 2024	Green Flags and Red Flags in a Relationship
279	October 10, 2024	Cutting Off Red Flag or Toxic People
280	October 17, 2024	Understanding Different Personality Part 1
281	October 24, 2024	Understanding Different Personality Part 2
282	November 14, 2024	Young Adults' Take on Settling Down
283	November 21, 2024	Things to Consider Before Settling Down
284	January 2, 2025	Culture and Traditions
285	January 16, 2025	Climate Change and Environment
286	January 30, 2025	Arts and Agribusiness
287	February 6, 2025	Youth Leadership
288	February 20, 2025	Breadwinner of the Family
289	March 6, 2025	Fur Parenting
290	March 27, 2025	Youth Involvement in Governance
291	April 24, 2025	Youth Vote
292	May 1, 2025	Understanding Gen Z Work Attitude
293	June 5, 2025	Gen Z Friendships: Beyond Labels and Stereotypes

== Year 11 Episodes ==
Ep	Date	School	Topic
294	June 26, 2025	Zoomers Perspective on HIV	
295	July 10, 2025	Various Schools	Sex Education in Primary and Secondary School
296	July 24, 2025		Artificial Intelligence Part 1: Is AI Gen Z's BFF or Frenemy?
297	July 31, 2025		Artificial Intelligence Part 2
298	August 14, 2025		Voices into Action: ASEAN Youth Month 2025
299	August 28, 2025	PUP School of Debaters and NU Debate Society	Lowering the Age of Criminal Liability to 10 years old for Heinous Crimes
300	September 18, 2025	Holy Angel University (Angeles, Pampanga)	Removal of the Mandatory Senior High School
301	September 25, 2025	Holy Angel University (Angeles, Pampanga)	College Degree for Local and National Government Positions
302	October 2, 2025		Social Media as a New Form for Protest
303	October 9, 2025	Capas, Tarlac	Tara sa Komyu (Documentary Special)
304	October 16, 2025	Polytechnic University of the Philippines and University of Caloocan City	Death Penalty for Corrupt Politicians
305	November 6, 2025	Eugenio Lopez Jr. Center for Media Arts Senior High School	Transgender Women in Beauty Pageants
306	November 13, 2025	Francisco P. Felix Memorial National High School - JICA Annex	Should the Government Regulate Social Media Use Among Teenagers
307	November 20, 2025	Francisco P. Felix Memorial National High School - JICA Annex	Lowering the Age of Eligibility to Run for Government Positions
308	November 27, 2025	Malabon National High School	Birth Control Access without Parent Consent
309	December 4, 2025	Malabon National High School	Civil Service Eligibility for Sangguniang Kabataan Officials
310	December 11, 2025		Iskoolmates Rewind: All About Relationships
311	December 18, 2025		Iskoolmates Rewind: Campus Journal, Share ko Lang, Field Trip and BidaKabataan
312	December 25, 2025		Iskoolmates Rewind: Giving Back to the Community
313	January 1, 2026		Iskoolmates Rewind: Trending Debates
314	January 22, 2026		Outgrowing Friendships: Selfish or Simply Part of Growing Up?
315	February 5, 2026		Posting Zero Era: Why Gen Z Posting Less on Social Media?
316	February 12, 2026		Love, Dates and Heartbreaks
317	February 19, 2026	Mariano Ponce National High School (Baliwag, Bulacan)	Call to End Mass Promotion in Schools
318	February 26, 2026	Mariano Ponce National High School (Baliwag, Bulacan)	Anti-Political Dynasty Bill
319	March 5, 2026		Factory Reset: Plot Twist or Self-Discovery?
320	March 12, 2026		National Women's Month
321	March 19, 2026	Far Eastern University (Cavite)	Abolition of the Party-List System
322	March 26, 2026	Far Eastern University (Cavite)	Abolition of the Pantawid Pamilyang Pilipino Program
323	April 9, 2026	National University and Far Eastern University	Abolition of the Sangguniang Kabataan
324	April 16, 2026	National University and Far Eastern University	Banning of Fraternity and Sorority in Schools
325	April 23, 2026		Summer Travel Vibes
326	May 21, 2026		Teaching Style and Reality in Today's Academic Landscape
327	June 4, 2026	Bulacan State University and Adamson University	Adding Tax to High-income Earners
328	June 11, 2026	Polytechnic University of the Philippines and Adamson University	Reduction of College General Education Units

== Year 12 Episodes ==
Ep	Date	School	Topic
329	June 25, 2026	Batangas State University - Alangilan Campus	Does Activism Promote Patriotism
330	July 2, 2026	Batangas State University - Alangilan Campus	Flooding: Caused by Poor Engineering Governance or Climate Change?
331	July 9, 2026	Nemesio I. Yabut Senior High School	Integrating Learners with Disabilities into Regular Classrooms
332	July 16, 2026	Nemesio I. Yabut Senior High School	Philippines to Rejoin International Criminal Court
333	July 23, 2026		Steering Youth-Focused Programs for the Philippines' 2026 ASEAN Chairship.
334	August 6, 2026	Mayamot National High School	Is Lowering the Age of Criminal Liability a Solution to End Violence Involving Children, or Does It Weaken the Juvenile Justice and Welfare Act?
335	August 13, 2026	Mayamot National High School	Banning of Violent Video Games
336	September 3, 2026		Access to Clean Water and Global Water Bankruptcy
337	September 24, 2026	Siena College of Taytay	Should Work Experience Over Educational Qualifications Be Given Higher Priority in Hiring for the Company Workforce?
338	October 1, 2026	Siena College of Taytay	Should Industries Allow Fully Automated Machines to Replace Human Workers in Jobs?
339	October 8, 2026	Holy Angel University (Angeles, Pampanga)	Pax Silica: Is it Good or Bad for the Country?
340	October 15, 2026	Holy Angel University (Angeles, Pampanga)	Cellphone Ban During Classes
341	November 4, 2026		Empowering Persons with Disabilities
342	November 12, 2026	Francisco P. Felix Memorial National High School - JICA Annex	Parents Should be held Legally and Financially Accountable for Serious Acts of Violence or Bullying Committed by Minors on School Grounds
343	November 19, 2026	Francisco P. Felix Memorial National High School - JICA Annex	Should Parents have the Right to Choose Their Children's Career Paths?
344	December 3, 2026	World Citi Colleges Quezon city	Should the Philippines Implement Stricter Regulations on Online Gambling Advertisements?
345	December 10, 2026	World Citi Colleges Quezon City	Should Public Officials Convicted of Corruption be Permanently Disqualified from Holding Public Office?

== Specials ==
- Tara sa Komyu (aired October 9, 2025) – The Iskoolmates joined with the Liwanag at Dunong during a special outreach to the Aeta community in Sitio Kalangitan, Capas, Tarlac, focusing on their mission to provide education and empowerment to indigenous learners in remote areas. The documentary will highlight this collaboration and Liwanag at Dunong's efforts in delivering resources and teaching students in the Aeta community.
- 2020 International Youth Day (aired August 12, 2020, via facebook live) – Iskoolmates Hosts Gab Bayan, Tricia Bersano and Sky Quizon discussed some issues concerning the youth like how to protect the children during pandemic and the current situation of education, these are in line with the celebration of the International Youth Day 2020.
- 2019 International Youth Day (aired August 12, 2019, via facebook live) – in partnership with the National Alliance of Youth Leaders, Iskoolmates Alumnus Jules Guiang and Iskoolmates Host and incumbent NAYL President Tricia Bersano hosted the facebook live discussion on transforming education in line with the celebration of the International Youth Day 2019.
- 2018 Philippine Inter-Collegiate Debating Championship (aired June 21, 2018) – Marked the 100th episode of Iskoolmates is the largest and most prestigious locally organized and locally hosted debate tournament in the country. The tournament follows the Asian Parliamentary format of debating in seven preliminary rounds, and four Finals Series rounds to determine the best debaters, adjudicators and public speakers in the country. It is a world-class tournament that focuses on the efficiency of its administration as well as the well-being of its participants.
- Sangguniang Kabataan Special Edition (aired May 10, 2018) – The first Sangguniang Kabataan Debate on National Television participated by SK Chairperson Candidates from the largest barangay in the Philippines, Barangay 176 Bagong Silang, Caloocan in cooperation with the Commission on Elections and National Youth Commission.
- Bulilit Day (aired October 23, 2016) – Iskoolmates Outreach Program to the children of Onesimo Bulilit Foundation in Tondo, Manila. This is our way of fulfilling our corporate social responsibility as we not only aim to share knowledge with our audience but to show that we make a difference in the lives of the Filipino youth.
- Iskoolmates 1st Anniversary Special (aired July 10, 2016) – in celebration of its 1st anniversary, Iskoolmates with the support of Metrobank Foundation and Antipolo mobile teachers organized an outreach program. The participants were the members of the Dumagat Tribe living in Purok Tayabasan, Sitio San Ysiro, San Jose, Antipolo and Purok Mainit a nearby community. There were fun games with fun prizes and a feeding program. But the highlight of the activity is the distribution of 100 school kits for everyone. Each of them received a school kit that comes with a notebook, two pad papers, two pencils, a ballpen, a box of crayons, sharpener, ruler and eraser.
- 2016 Philippine Inter-Collegiate Debating Championship (aired April 24, 2016) – is the largest and most prestigious locally organized and locally hosted debate tournament in the country. The tournament follows the Asian Parliamentary format of debating in seven preliminary rounds, and four Finals Series rounds to determine the best debaters, adjudicators and public speakers in the country. It is a world-class tournament that focuses on the efficiency of its administration as well as the well-being of its participants.
- EDSA 30 (aired February 21, 2016) – The special episode in partnership with EDSA People Power Commission discussed the relevance of People Power thirty years after the revolution. The show featured debates from UP University Student Council, students from different schools and universities was also invited as part of the live audience and joined the discussion.
- Bangkarunungan (aired December 20, 2015) – A project that brings education through boat. Iskoolmates and Teacher Adrian, the founder of Bangkarunungan and other volunteers traveled by boat to Sitio Sampaloc, a poor coastal community in Zambales to teach basic reading and distribute educational materials to the children.

== Segments ==
- BidaKabataan – inspiring and extraordinary stories of the youth.
- Iskoolmates Campus Journal – a feature of school events and activities involving the youth and aims to encourage the students to participate in extra-curricular activities that can also help them build networks and acquire new knowledge about important topics and issues in society.
- Iskoolmates Field Trip – educational tour in different places.
- IskoolMeet – fun and exciting games for the youth.
- Iskooltour – a short narration of the school/university’s historical background, notable achievements and what it has to offer to the students including facilities and their core values.
- What's on Your Mind – the social media segment. The host reads the comments and opinions of the netizens regarding the topic.
- Share Ko Lang – a short video presentation of youth activities of any group, organization or individuals.

== Hosts ==
- Tricia Bersano (2018–present)
- James Ramada (2024–present)

== Alumni ==
- Gab Bayan (2018–23)
- Gina Donato (2021–23)
- Eurwin Canzana (2021–22)
- Sky Quizon (2018–21)
- Nico Estibar (2019–20)
- Sunny Kim (2019–20)
- Jules Guiang (2015–18)
- JV Cruz (2015–18)
- Mico Aytona (2015–18)
- Hessa Gonzales (2015–17)
- Kat Medina (2016–17)

== National Accolades ==
Year	Award-giving body	Category	Recipient/s	Result
2026	DokyuBata Video Festival by National Council for Children's Television	Best Documentary (Adult Division)	Tara sa Komyu (Iskoolmates Documentary)	Nominated
2026	FAMAS Short Film Festival by Filipino Academy of Movie Arts and Sciences and REMS Entertainment Production	Best Documentary Film	Tara sa Komyu (Iskoolmates Documentary)	Won
2026	Net Makabata Star Awards by Southeast Asian Foundation for Children and Television	Child-Friendly Online Personality	Tricia Bersano and James Ramada	Nominated
2026	Anak TV Seal Awards by Southeast Asian Foundation for Children and Television	Child-Sensitive and Family-Friendly Program	Iskoolmates	Won
2026	Child-Friendly Content Awards by National Council for Children's Television	Child-Friendly Television Program	Iskoolmates	Honorable Mention
2026	The Catholic Mass Media Awards by Catholic Mass Media Awards Foundation, Inc.	Best Children and Youth Program	Iskoolmates	Nominated
2026	Makatao Awards for Media Excellence by Philippine Management Association of the Philippines	Social Media Citation	Iskoolmates	Nominated
2026	ALTA Media Icon Awards by University of Perpetual Help System DALTA	Best Youth-Oriented Program	Iskoolmates	Won
2026	FAMAS Broadcast Arts Awards by Filipino Academy of Movie Arts and Sciences	Best Public Affairs Talk Show	Iskoolmates	Nominated
2026	Inding-Indie Excellence Awards by Inding-Indie Film Festival	Excellence Award for Youth-Oriented Public Affairs Broadcasting	Iskoolmates	Won
2026	Primetime Media Choice Awards by Primetime Media Management Inc.	Best Public Affairs Program	Iskoolmates	Nominated
2026	Gandingan Awards by UP Community Broadcasters' Society	Most Development-Oriented Youth Program	Iskoolmates	Nominated
2026	Gandingan Awards by UP Community Broadcasters' Society	Most Development-Oriented Educational Program	Iskoolmates	Won
2026	Gandingan Awards by UP Community Broadcasters' Society	Most Participatory Program	Iskoolmates	Nominated
2026	Platinum Stallion National Media Awards by Trinity University of Asia	Youth Oriented Program of the Year	Iskoolmates	Won
2026	Gawad Lasallianeta by De La Salle Araneta University	Most Outstanding Educational/Youth Oriented Show	Iskoolmates	Nominated
2026	Gawad Lasallianeta by De La Salle Araneta University	Most Outstanding Educational/Youth Oriented Show Hosts	Tricia Bersano and James Ramada	Nominated
2025	Net Makabata Star Awards by Southeast Asian Foundation for Children and Television	Child-Friendly Online Personality	Tricia Bersano and James Ramada	Nominated
2025	Influencers Watchlist by Mabuhay PH Digital Network	Influencer of the Year for TV Youth Talk Show Host	James Ramada	Won
2025	The Ripple Awards by LoveYourself, Inc.	Ripple of Inspiration for Youth Empowerment	Iskoolmates	Nominated
2025	The Catholic Mass Media Awards by Catholic Mass Media Awards Foundation, Inc.	Best Children and Youth Program	Iskoolmates	Nominated
2025	Anak TV Seal Awards by Southeast Asian Foundation for Children and Television	Child-Sensitive and Family-Friendly Program	Iskoolmates	Won
2025	Child-Friendly Content Awards by National Council for Children's Television	Child-Friendly Television Program	Iskoolmates	Honorable Mention
2025	Gandingan Awards by UP Community Broadcasters' Society	Gandingan ng Kabataan	Tricia Bersano	Nominated
2025	Gandingan Awards by UP Community Broadcasters' Society	Most Development-Oriented Youth Program	Iskoolmates	Won
2025	Gandingan Awards by UP Community Broadcasters' Society	Most Participatory Program	Iskoolmates	Won
2025	Star Awards for Television by Philippine Movie Press Club	Best Public Affairs Program	Iskoolmates	Nominated
2025	Platinum Stallion National Media Awards by Trinity University of Asia	Youth Oriented Program of the Year	Iskoolmates	Won
2025	Gawad Lasallianeta by De La Salle Araneta University	Most Outstanding Current Affairs Talk Show	Iskoolmates	Nominated
2025	Gawad Lasallianeta by De La Salle Araneta University	Most Outstanding Current Affairs Talk Show Hosts	Tricia Bersano and James Ramada	Nominated
2024	Net Makabata Star Awards by Southeast Asian Foundation for Children and Television	Child-Friendly Online Personality	Tricia Bersano and James Ramada	Nominated
2024	Child-Friendly Content Awards by National Council for Children's Television	Child-Friendly Television Program	Iskoolmates	Special Citation
2024	Anak TV Seal Awards by Southeast Asian Foundation for Children and Television	Child-Sensitive and Family-Friendly Program	Iskoolmates	Won
2024	The Catholic Mass Media Awards by Catholic Mass Media Awards Foundation, Inc.	Best Children and Youth Program	Iskoolmates	Nominated
2024	Ten Accomplished Youth Organizations by TAYO Awards Foundation	Education and Technology	Iskoolmates	Qualifier
2024	Gandingan Awards by UP Community Broadcasters' Society	Gandingan ng Kabataan	Gab Bayan, Tricia Bersano, Gina Donato	Nominated
2024	Gandingan Awards by UP Community Broadcasters' Society	Most Participatory Program	Iskoolmates	Nominated
2024	Gandingan Awards by UP Community Broadcasters' Society	Most Development-Oriented Youth Program	Iskoolmates	Won
2024	Platinum Stallion National Media Awards by Trinity University of Asia	Youth Oriented Program of the Year	Iskoolmates	Won
2024	Gawad Lasallianeta by De La Salle Araneta University	Most Outstanding Current Affairs Talk Show	Iskoolmates	Nominated
2024	Gawad Lasallianeta by De La Salle Araneta University	Most Outstanding Current Affairs Talk Show Hosts	Gab Bayan, Tricia Bersano, Gina Donato	Nominated
2023	Anak TV Seal Awards by Southeast Asian Foundation for Children and Television	Child-Sensitive and Family-Friendly Program	Iskoolmates	Won
2023	Star Awards for Television by Philippine Movie Press Club	Best Public Affairs Program	Iskoolmates	Nominated
2023	PPop Awards by Philippine Pop Artists League	Pop TV Youth Oriented Program of the Year	Iskoolmates	Won
2023	The Catholic Mass Media Awards by Catholic Mass Media Awards Foundation, Inc.	Best News Magazine	Iskoolmates	Special Citation
2023	The Catholic Mass Media Awards by Catholic Mass Media Awards Foundation, Inc.	Best Talk Show	Iskoolmates	Nominated
2023	Makatao Awards for Media Excellence by Philippine Management Association of the Philippines	Social Media Citation	Iskoolmates	Won
2023	What the Fact? The Philippines Digital Choice Awards by Young Filipino Advocates of Critical Thinking - Lyceum of the Philippines University	Kaakibat ng Kabataan	Iskoolmates	Won
2023	Paragala: The Central Luzon Media Awards by Holy Angel University	Paragala Pangkaunlaran	Iskoolmates	Nominated
2023	Gandingan Awards by UP Community Broadcasters' Society	Most Development-Oriented Youth Program	Iskoolmates	Nominated
2023	Gandingan Awards by UP Community Broadcasters' Society	Most Development-Oriented Educational Program	Iskoolmates	Nominated
2023	Gandingan Awards by UP Community Broadcasters' Society	Most Participatory Program	Iskoolmates	Nominated
2023	Gandingan Awards by UP Community Broadcasters' Society	Gandingan ng Kabataan	Gab Bayan, Tricia Bersano, Gina Donato	Won
2023	Platinum Stallion National Media Awards by Trinity University of Asia	Youth Oriented Program	Iskoolmates	Special Citation
2023	Gawad Lasallianeta by De La Salle Araneta University	Green Zeal Award for Excellence in Empowering and Giving Voice to the Filipino Youth	Iskoolmates	Won
2023	Gawad Lasallianeta by De La Salle Araneta University	Most Outstanding Current Affairs Talk Show	Iskoolmates	Nominated
2023	Gawad Lasallianeta by De La Salle Araneta University	Most Outstanding Current Affairs Talk Show Hosts	Gab Bayan, Tricia Bersano, Gina Donato, Eurwin Canzana	Nominated
2023	GEMS: Hiyas ng Sining by Guild of Educators, Mentors and Students	Best TV Program (Documentary/Educational/Informative)	Iskoolmates	Won
2023	GEMS: Hiyas ng Sining by Guild of Educators, Mentors and Students	Best TV Program Host (Documentary/Educational/Informative)	Gab Bayan	Nominated
2022	PPop Awards by Philippine Pop Artists League	Pop TV Youth Oriented Program of the Year	Iskoolmates	Won
2022	Makatao Awards for Media Excellence by Philippine Management Association of the Philippines	Social Media Citation	Iskoolmates	Won
2022	The Catholic Mass Media Awards by Catholic Mass Media Awards Foundation, Inc.	Best Children and Youth Program	Iskoolmates	Nominated
2022	The Catholic Mass Media Awards by Catholic Mass Media Awards Foundation, Inc.	Best News Magazine	Iskoolmates	Nominated
2022	Gandingan Awards by UP Community Broadcasters' Society	Most Development-Oriented Youth Program	Iskoolmates	Nominated
2022	Gandingan Awards by UP Community Broadcasters' Society	Most Development-Oriented Talk/Discussion Program	Iskoolmates	Nominated
2022	Gandingan Awards by UP Community Broadcasters' Society	Most Participatory Program	Iskoolmates	Nominated
2022	Gandingan Awards by UP Community Broadcasters' Society	Gandingan ng Kabataan	Gab Bayan, Tricia Bersano	Nominated
2022	Gawad Lasallianeta by De La Salle Araneta University	Most Outstanding Current Affairs/ Talk Show	Iskoolmates	Nominated
2022	Paragala: The Central Luzon Media Awards by Holy Angel University	Best Youth-Oriented Digital Media	Iskoolmates	Nominated
2021	The Catholic Mass Media Awards by Catholic Mass Media Awards Foundation, Inc.	Best Children and Youth Program	Iskoolmates	Won
2021	Gandingan Awards by UP Community Broadcasters' Society	Most Development-Oriented Youth Program	Iskoolmates	Won
2021	Gandingan Awards by UP Community Broadcasters' Society	Most Development-Oriented Talk/Discussion Program	Iskoolmates	Nominated
2021	Gandingan Awards by UP Community Broadcasters' Society	Most Development-Oriented Environment Program	Iskoolmates	Nominated
2021	Gandingan Awards by UP Community Broadcasters' Society	Most Participatory Program	Iskoolmates	Nominated
2021	Gandingan Awards by UP Community Broadcasters' Society	Gandingan ng Kabataan	Gab Bayan, Tricia Bersano, Sky Quizon	Won
2020	The Catholic Mass Media Awards by Catholic Mass Media Awards Foundation, Inc.	Best Children and Youth Program	Iskoolmates	Nominated
2020	The Catholic Mass Media Awards by Catholic Mass Media Awards Foundation, Inc.	Best News Magazine	Iskoolmates	Nominated
2020	Gandingan Awards by UP Community Broadcasters' Society	Most Development-Oriented Youth Program	Iskoolmates	Nominated
2020	Gandingan Awards by UP Community Broadcasters' Society	Most Participatory Program	Iskoolmates	Nominated
2020	Gandingan Awards by UP Community Broadcasters' Society	Gandingan ng Kabataan	Gab Bayan, Tricia Bersano, Sky Quizon	Special Citation
2020	Gawad Lasallianeta by De La Salle Araneta University	Most Outstanding Informative/Educational Show	Iskoolmates	Nominated
2020	Gawad Lasallianeta by De La Salle Araneta University	Most Outstanding Informative/Educational Show Hosts	Gab Bayan, Tricia Bersano, Sky Quizon, Nico Estibar	Nominated
2019	Anak TV Seal Awards by Southeast Asian Foundation for Children and Television	Child-Sensitive and Family-Friendly Program	Iskoolmates	Won
2019	The Catholic Mass Media Awards by Catholic Mass Media Awards Foundation, Inc.	Best Children and Youth Program	Iskoolmates	Nominated
2019	The Catholic Mass Media Awards by Catholic Mass Media Awards Foundation, Inc.	Best Talk Show	Iskoolmates	Nominated
2019	Gandingan Awards by UP Community Broadcasters' Society	Most Development-Oriented Youth Program	Iskoolmates	Nominated
2019	Gandingan Awards by UP Community Broadcasters' Society	Most Development-Oriented Talk/Discussion Program	Iskoolmates	Nominated
2019	Gandingan Awards by UP Community Broadcasters' Society	Most Participatory Program	Iskoolmates	Won
2019	Gandingan Awards by UP Community Broadcasters' Society	Gandingan ng Kabataan	Gab Bayan, Tricia Bersano, Sky Quizon	Nominated
2019	Gawad Lasallianeta by De La Salle Araneta University	Most Outstanding Public Affairs Show	Iskoolmates	Nominated
2018	Anak TV Seal Awards by Southeast Asian Foundation for Children and Television	Child-Sensitive and Family-Friendly Program	Iskoolmates	Won
2018	The Catholic Mass Media Awards by Catholic Mass Media Awards Foundation, Inc.	Best Children and Youth Program	Iskoolmates	Nominated
2018	The Catholic Mass Media Awards by Catholic Mass Media Awards Foundation, Inc.	Best Talk Show	Iskoolmates	Nominated
2018	Makatao Awards for Media Excellence by Philippine Management Association of the Philippines	Best Public Affairs Program	Iskoolmates	Nominated
2018	Makatao Awards for Media Excellence by Philippine Management Association of the Philippines	Best Public Affairs Program Host	Jules Guiang	Nominated
2018	Gandingan Awards by UP Community Broadcasters' Society	Most Development-Oriented Youth Program	Iskoolmates	Special Citation
2018	Gandingan Awards by UP Community Broadcasters' Society	Most Participatory Program	Iskoolmates	Special Citation
2018	Gandingan Awards by UP Community Broadcasters' Society	Most Development-Oriented Talk Show	Iskoolmates	Nominated
2018	Gandingan Awards by UP Community Broadcasters' Society	Best TV Program Host	Jules Guiang	Nominated
2018	Gandingan Awards by UP Community Broadcasters' Society	Gandingan ng Kabataan	Jules Guiang, Hessa Gonzales, JV Cruz, Kat Medina, Mico Aytona	Nominated
2018	Star Awards for Television by Philippine Movie Press Club	Best Public Affairs Program	Iskoolmates	Nominated
2018	Star Awards for Television by Philippine Movie Press Club	Best New Female TV Personality	Tricia Bersano	Nominated
2017	Anak TV Seal Awards by Southeast Asian Foundation for Children and Television	Child-Sensitive and Family-Friendly Program	Iskoolmates	Won
2017	Gandingan Awards by UP Community Broadcasters' Society	Most Development-Oriented Youth Program	Iskoolmates	Won
2017	Gandingan Awards by UP Community Broadcasters' Society	Most Development-Oriented Public Service Program	Iskoolmates	Nominated
2017	Gandingan Awards by UP Community Broadcasters' Society	Most Development-Oriented Talk Show	Iskoolmates	Nominated
2017	Gandingan Awards by UP Community Broadcasters' Society	Best Public Service Program Host	Jules Guiang	Nominated
2017	Gandingan Awards by UP Community Broadcasters' Society	Best Talk Show Hosts	Jules Guiang, Hessa Gonzales, JV Cruz	Nominated
2017	Gandingan Awards by UP Community Broadcasters' Society	Gandingan ng Kabataan	Jules Guiang, Hessa Gonzales, JV Cruz, Kat Medina, Mico Aytona	Special Citation
2016	Gandingan Awards by UP Community Broadcasters' Society	Most Development-Oriented Youth Program	Iskoolmates	Nominated
2015	Star Awards for Television by Philippine Movie Press Club	Best New Male TV Personality	JV Cruz	Nominated

== International Accolades ==
Year	Award-giving body	Category	Recipient/s	Result
2026	ContentAsia Awards by Pencil Media Pte Ltd	Best Current Affairs Programme Made in Asia for a Single Market in Asia	Iskoolmates	Nominated
2025	ASIAN Television Awards by Wonder. Paradise International	Best Talk Show	Iskoolmates	Nominated
2024	ContentAsia Awards by Pencil Media Pte Ltd	Best Asian Talk Show	Iskoolmates	Nominated
2024	ASIAN Television Awards by Wonder. Paradise International	Best Talk Show Host	Tricia Bersano	Nominated
2023	ASIAN Television Awards by Wonder. Paradise International	Best Talk Show Host	Gab Bayan	Nominated
2022	ASIAN Television Awards by Wonder. Paradise International	Best Talk Show	Iskoolmates	Nominated
2021	ASIAN Television Awards by Wonder. Paradise International	Best Talk Show	Iskoolmates	Nominated

== Extension ==
- Iskoolmates sa Norte - August 17, 2023 to present

== See also ==
- People's Television Network
