= Siena College of Taytay =

Roman Catholic college in Rizal, Philippines

- Dalubhasaang Siena sa Taytay (Filipino)
- Former names: St. Catherine Academy (1957–1982)
- Motto: Passion for Truth. Compassion for Humanity
- Type: Private, Catholic, non-stock coeducational basic and higher education institution
- Established: June 1957; 69 years ago
- Founder: Congregation of the Dominican Sisters of St. Catherine of Siena
- Religious affiliation: Roman Catholic (Siena Sisters)
- Academic affiliations: PAASCU CEAP DOMNET
- President: Sr. Daisy L. Fornan, OP
- Principal: Mrs. Rowena E. Embile
- Location: E. Rodriguez Ave. Siena Heights, Brgy. San Isidro Taytay, Rizal, Philippines; 14°34′9″N 121°7′57″E
- Campus: Urban
- Medium of instruction: English
- Patron saints: St. Thomas of Aquinas; St. Dominic de Guzman; St. Lorenzo Ruiz; St. Catherine of Siena; St. Rose of Lima; Our Lady of the Rosary; St. Albertus Magnus
- Colors: Black - Maroon; White - Yellow
- Nickname: Sienan
- Mascot: Dog
- Website: www.sct.edu.ph
- Location in Luzon Location in the Philippines

Siena College of Taytay, also referred to by its acronym SCT, is a private, non-profit Catholic basic and higher education institution run by the Congregation of the Dominican Sisters of St. Catherine of Siena in Taytay, Rizal, Philippines. It was named St. Catherine Academy at foundation in 1957 by the Dominican Sisters of Siena and it is one of six Dominican educational institutions in the Philippines. Its sister schools are Siena College of Quezon City, Siena College of San Jose, Siena College of Hermosa, and Siena College of Tigaon.

== History ==
In 1956, the late Cardinal Rufino Santos of the Archbishop of Manila invited the Dominican sisters to establish an academy for the education of local children. In 1957, Saint Catherine Academy opened during the tenure of the late Mother Natividad Pilapil O.P., the Superior General of the Congregation.

The college's facility was originally located in the Parish compound of St. John the Baptist in Taytay, Rizal. In 1965, the kindergarten, elementary and secondary education courses were fully established and recognized by the Philippine Department of Education, Culture and Sports.

In 2025, Siena College signed an agreement with ACEN Corporation to power its Taytay campus with 100-percent renewable energy.

== Facilities ==
The college's campus in Taytay is now located at E. Rodriguez Avenue, Siena Heights, Barangay San Isidro, Taytay, Rizal. The main and oldest, facility, the three-story Saint Catherine Building located at the town proper adjacent to the Saint John the Baptist Parish church, was gutted by fire in 2002 and was not rebuilt. At the new location, a four-story building was constructed. This has a number of classrooms and a large Speech Laboratory in the newly added third floor. There are also houses for freshman high school students.

The Mother Natividad Pilapil O.P. (Latin: Ordinis Praedicatorum; English: Order of Preachers) building houses kindergarten 1 and 2, grade one pupils, and faculty rooms for their teachers. It is located through Gate 1 of the campus.

The Saint Dominic De Guzman Building, named after the founder of the Dominican order, houses the junior and senior high school students, computer rooms for college and high school students, and the Cyber program. It also houses the registrar's office, guidance office, testing center, grade school library, GLL office, YLL office, and Instructional Media Center.

The Saint Thomas Aquinas Building contains instructional rooms for the senior high and college students, laboratories, and college library. It can be accessed through Gates 3 and 4. The building is named after the 13th-century philosopher.

The Our Lady of the Holy Rosary Building houses the publishing office, cafeteria, clinic and chapel.

The Saint Jacques Centre de Formatione - Hotelliere et Restaurateur (Saint Jacques Center for International Hospitality Education - Hotel and Restaurant) houses the college's signature program in Hotel and Restaurant Management. It also houses senior high students in the TECH-VOC Strand, with specialization in cookery. Historically, the Parisian Dominican house was located in the parish of Saint Jacques.

The Mother Francisca Hall is an auditorium. The San Lorenzo Ruiz Hall is named for the Filipino martyred during persecution of Japanese Christians under the 17th-century Tokugawa Shogunate. The gymnasium offers student facilities, including the St. Catherine Covered Court, an Semi-Olympic sized swimming pool, and the St. Martin Sports Complex.

The Saint Albertus Magnus building was scheduled to house college students in the 2018–2019 school year. The building is composed of 25 rooms on five floors.

== See also ==
- Siena College of Quezon City
- Notre Dame-Siena College of Polomolok, South Cotabato
