= Notre Dame-Siena College of Polomolok =

Roman Catholic college in South Cotabato, Philippines

- Former name: Notre Dame of Polomolok (1957–2004)
- Type: Private, Catholic, non-stock basic and higher education institution
- Established: 1957; 69 years ago
- Founder: Congregation of the Dominican Sisters of St. Catherine of Siena
- Accreditation: PAASCU
- Religious affiliation: Roman Catholic (Siena Sisters)
- Academic affiliations: CEAP NDEA
- President: Sr. Pinlyn Dahili, OP
- Principal: Sr. Lani O. Julia, OP
- Location: Pitimini Street Polomolok, South Cotabato, Philippines; 6°13′24″N 125°03′34″E
- Campus: Urban
- Patron saints*: Blessed Virgin Mary (Under the title of Our Lady of the Rosary); Catherine of Siena; Thomas Aquinas; Dominic de Guzman; Lorenzo Ruiz; Rose of Lima; Albertus Magnus
- Colors: Black Gold; White Maroon
- Location in Mindanao Location in the Philippines

Notre Dame-Siena College of Polomolok is a private, Catholic, non-stock basic and higher education institution run by the Congregation of the Dominican Sisters of St. Catherine of Siena in Polomolok, South Cotabato, Philippines. It was founded by the (Siena Sisters) in 1957 and was named Notre Dame of Polomolok (NDP) but changed its name to Notre Dame-Siena College of Polomolok at the opening of its college department in 2004. Notre Dame-Siena College of Polomolok is a member of the Notre Dame Educational Association, a group of Notre Dame Schools in the Philippines under the patronage of the Blessed Virgin Mary. The college offers a complete basic education and selected college education programs as follows:

- Bachelor of Science in Computer Science (BSCS)
- Bachelor of Science in Information Technology (BSIT)
- Bachelor of Elementary Education (BEED) major in Content Areas
- Bachelor of Secondary Education (BSED)
- Bachelor of Science in Business Administration (BSBA) major in Business Management
- Bachelor of Science in Entrepreneurship (BSE)
- Bachelor in Technical and Vocational Education (BTVE)

ND-SCP is administered by the Dominican Sisters of St. Catherine of Siena.

== Presidents ==
- 2004–2005 ----- Sr. Lina G. Tuyac, OP, Ph.D.
- 2005–2008 ----- Sr. Anna Marie Gatmaytan, O.P., Ph.D.
- 2008–2011 ----- Sr. Mercedes R. Lalisan, O.P., Ph.D.
- 2011–2014 ----- Sr. Lina G. Tuyac, O.P., Ph.D.
- 2014–2019 ----- Sr. Gina M. Galang, O.P., Ph.D.
- 2019–2022 ------ Sr. Pinlyn B. Dahili, OP., Ph.D.
- 2022-present ---- Sr. Mercedes R. Lalisan, OP., PhD

== See also ==
- Siena College of Quezon City
- Siena College of Taytay, Rizal
