= Espenilla =

Espenilla is a surname. Notable people with the surname include:

- Cecilia Espenilla (born 1960), Filipino Roman Catholic religious sister and human rights activist
- Nestor Espenilla (1958–2019), Filipino banker
