= Siena College of Quezon City =

Roman Catholic college in Quezon City, Philippines

- Dalubhasaang Siena sa Quezon City (Filipino)
- Motto: Ardens veritatis, Misericordia pro humanitate continent (Latin)
- Motto in English: Passion for Truth and Compassion for Humanity
- Type: Private Non-stock Basic and Higher education institution
- Established: 1959; 67 years ago
- Founders: Rev.Mo.Natividad Pilapil, O.P
- Religious affiliation: Roman Catholic (Siena Sisters)
- Academic affiliations: PAASCU CEAP DOMNET
- President: Sr. Maria Cecilia P. Varon, O.P
- Principal: Sr. Enriqueta B. Arnaiz, O.P
- Dean: Sr. Gina M. Galang, OP
- Director: Sr. Felicidad Lala, OP (Director for Administrative Service)
- Mother Superior: Mo.Ma.Cecilia DJ. Calaguas, O.P
- Students: approx. 2,500
- Location: 1105 Del Monte Ave. Corner Sto. Domingo St., Quezon City, Metro Manila, Philippines; 14°38′17.39″N 121°0′16.24″E
- Campus: Urban
- Alma Mater song: Siena College Hymn
- Medium of instruction: English
- Colors: Black - Red; White - Yellow
- Sporting affiliations: AAPS, MMICAA QCAA
- Website: www.scqc.edu.ph

- Location in Metro Manila Location in Luzon Location in the Philippines

Siena College of Quezon City is a private, sectarian, non-stock basic and higher education institution run by the Congregation of the Dominican Sisters of St. Catherine of Siena in San Francisco del Monte, Quezon City, Philippines. It was established in 1959 by the Siena Sisters. The school offers tertiary education with degrees in Tourism, Business Administration, Hotel and Restaurant Management, Mass Communications, and Religious Education. It also offers pre-school, elementary, secondary education, and SPED.

== History ==
In its mission to “participate in the evangelizing mission of the Church by proclaiming Jesus Christ and building the Kingdom of God,” the Congregation of the Dominican Sisters of St. Catherine of Siena has established schools throughout the country and abroad. In the mid-1950s, the idea of setting up another school within the compound of the Motherhouse located in the then rugged fields of San Francisco del Monte was conceived in response to the education needs of the growing community in the area. At that time, the entire place was in disarray; under Rev. Natividad Pilapil, O.P., the Superior General of the Congregation, construction of the first building along Del Monte Avenue was started in 1958.

At the start of the school year 1959–1960, Siena College opened its doors to 500 students who enrolled in the grade school, high school and college departments. The courses offered then in the college were Bachelor of Science in Arts, Commerce and Education, Secretarial and Home Arts.

In 1972, Siena College phased out the traditional four-year courses and retained only the Secretarial and Special Home Arts courses. In lieu of these, terminal courses were offered and the ladder-type curriculum was adopted. These courses were Bachelor of Science in Business Administration, Secretarial Administration, Food Service Administration, Junior Secretarial Course, Food Technology, Practical Entrepreneurship, Hotel and Restaurant Management, General Clerical Course and Tourism.

At this time, the grade school adopted the Individualized Group-Guided Education (IGGE) program.

The school later underwent two self-surveys: one during the school year 1974-75 and the other during the school year 1976–77. The Council on Education of the Congregation conducted these surveys. As a result of these, the school administration and staff to planned to apply for accreditation. The Education Council of the institution unanimously approved of the plan.

The school year 1977-78 marked a more thorough and rigid operational self-survey using the PAASCU (Philippine Accrediting Association of Schools, Colleges and Universities) tools for evaluation. The three departments of Siena College underwent the PAASCU preliminary surveys during the school year 1978–79. The following year, after a successful formal survey by the PAASCU, the grade school and the high school departments, as well as the college program of Bachelor of Science in Business Administration were granted accreditation for three years.

In 1980, the Congregation, through the General Chapter, approved the program of development for all its schools. This program is the Catholic Schools-Systems Development (CS-SD). A unique and highly systematized program, the CS-SD consists of different phases of continuing development for Catholic schools with emphasis on the formation of personnel into other Christ through a radical living of the Gospel and the improvement of education services through Christ-like operations. Siena College entered the program immediately after its formation by the Congregation. The program, as adopted, came to be known as OP-SSD (Order of Preachers-Schools Systems Development Program). The congregational Council on Education facilitated its implementation.

In October 1982, the three departments of Siena College underwent the first Congregational Evaluation Visit (CEV), which is part of the CS-SD program. It looked into how the school's instructional program and operations are in consonance with the congregational mission and charism. In February of the same school year, 1982–83, the college and high school departments had their PAASCU re-accreditation visits, successfully passed it and were given an accredited status for five years. The grade school had its re-accreditation visit last August 1983 and was also given a five-year accredited status. The three departments were visited and surveyed again during the school year 1988-89 and were again granted accreditation for another five years. The three departments again passed the resurvey visits during the school years 1994-95 and 2000-2001 successfully.

The following new programs were opened in 2003: the Caregiver course to enhance the development of skilled human resources in the health, social and other community development services and the Special Education program to provide conducive learning environment and facilities for special children. In 2004, the Night High School program was opened to accommodate the needs of poor public elementary school graduates. As a PAASCU member since 1980, Siena College, QC was granted again five-year re-accreditation status to the three departments in AY 2005–2006.

== Notable alumni ==
- Angelu de Leon (actress)
- Amy Perez (actress)
- Hilda Koronel (actress)
- Kimberly Diaz (actress)
- Rio Locsin (actress)
- Erich Gonzales (actress)
- Robin Padilla (actor and senator)
- Antonio Trillanes IV (senator, Siena GS 1983)
- Dylan Ababou (basketball athlete)
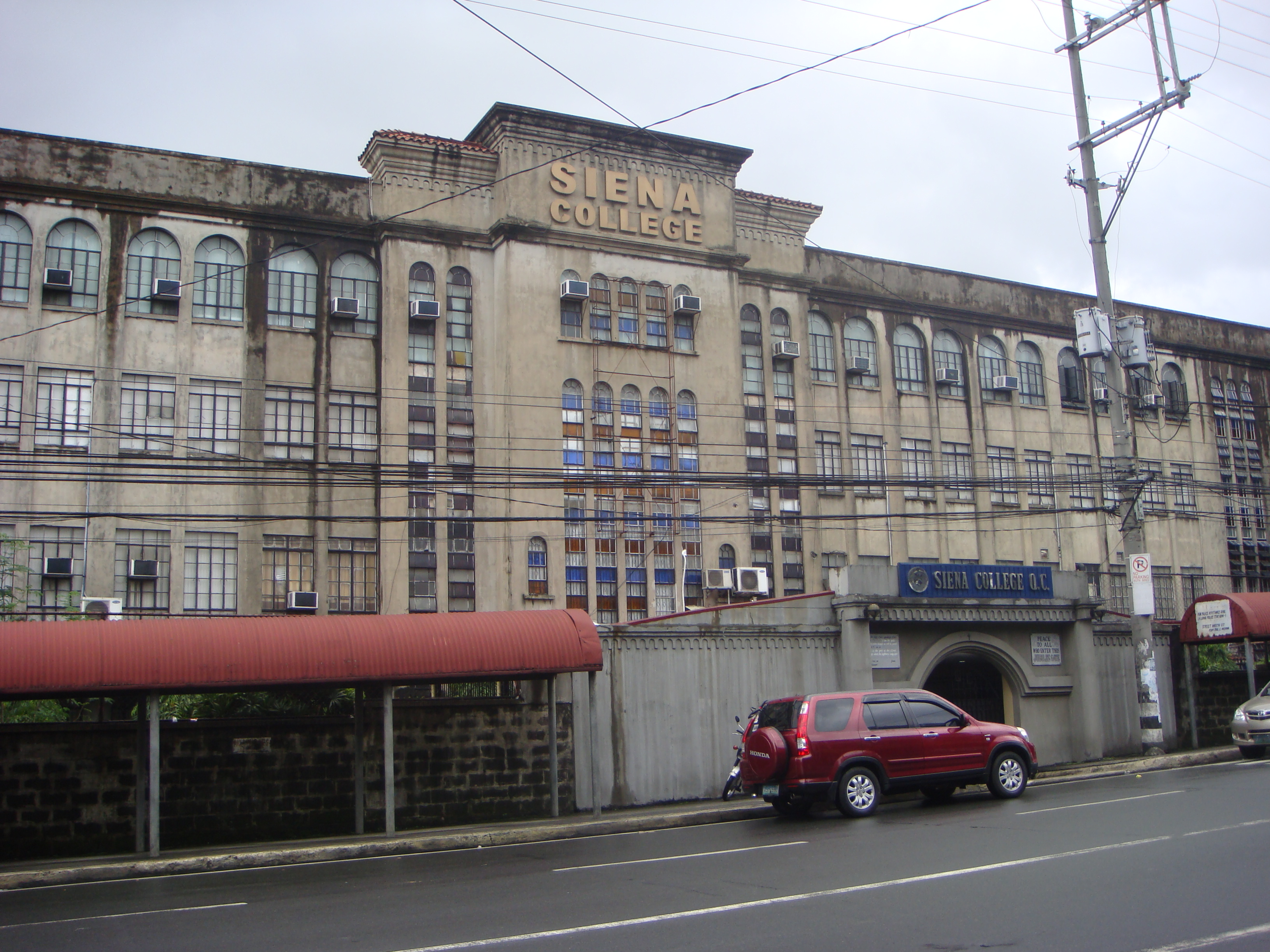
Del Monte Avenue Entrance

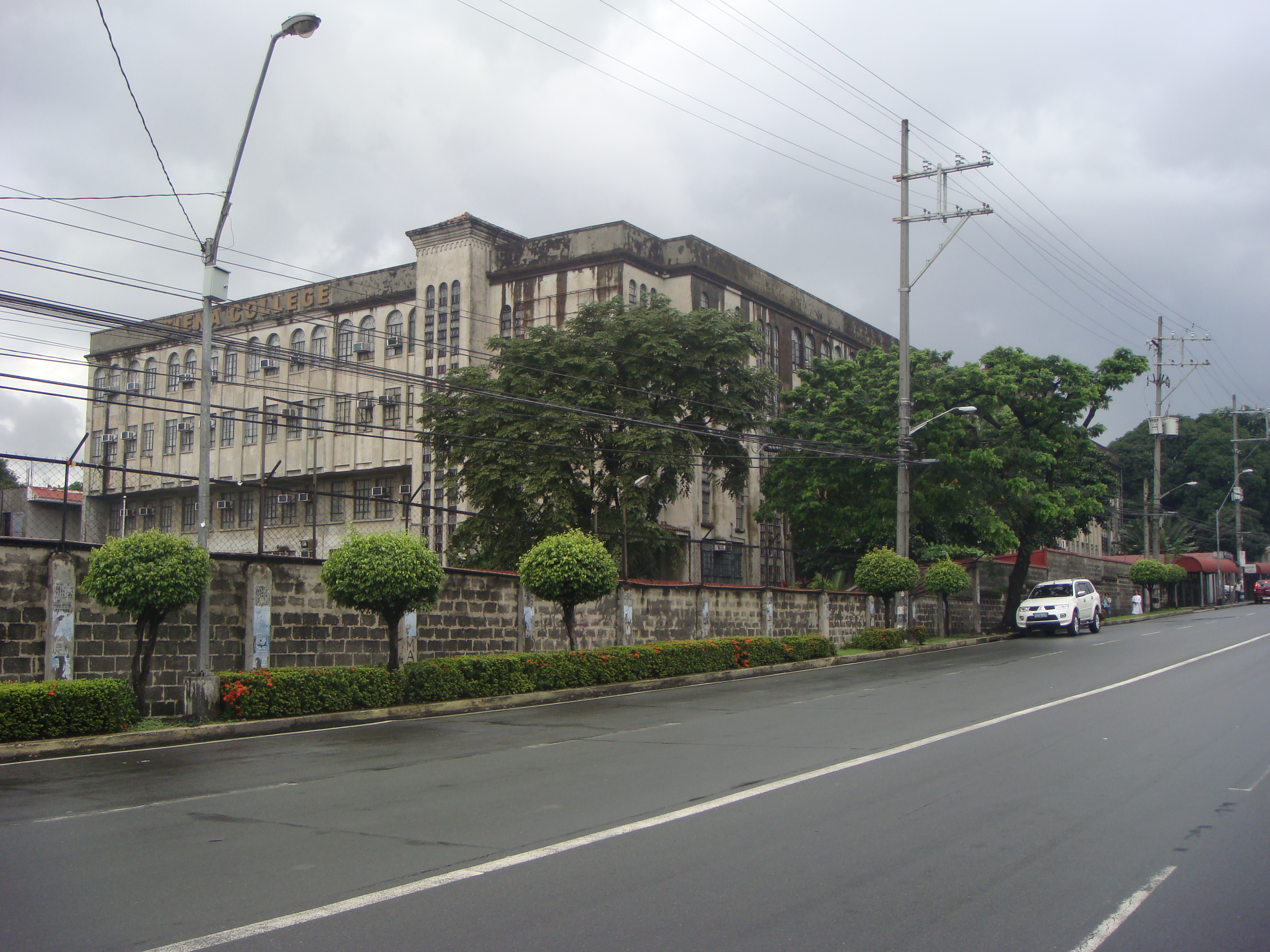
View from Del Monte Avenue

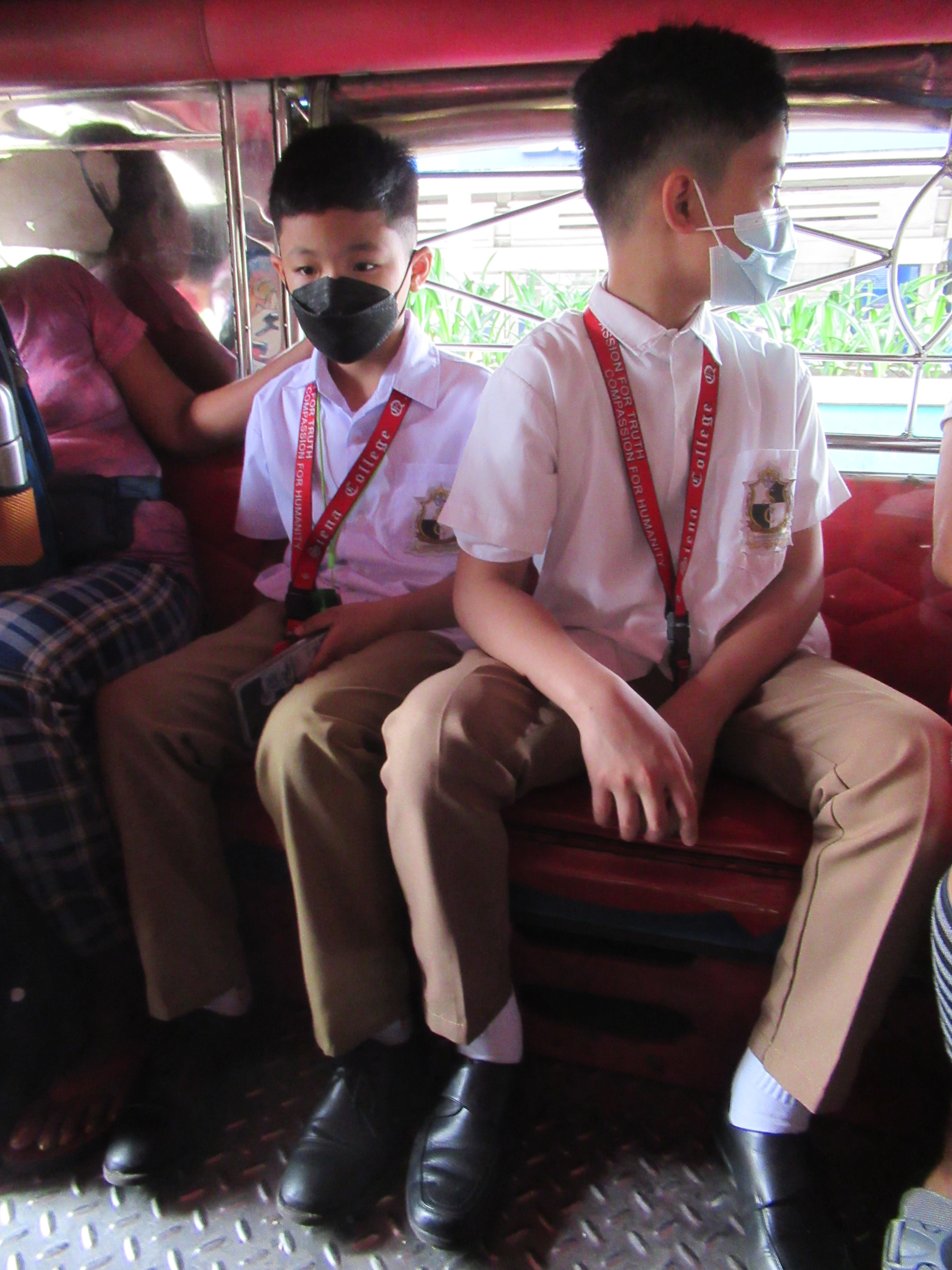
Students

== See also ==
- Siena College of Taytay, Rizal
- Notre Dame-Siena College of Polomolok, South Cotabato
