= Kalayaan College =

Private college in Quezon City, Philippines

- Dalubhasaang Kalayaan (Filipino)
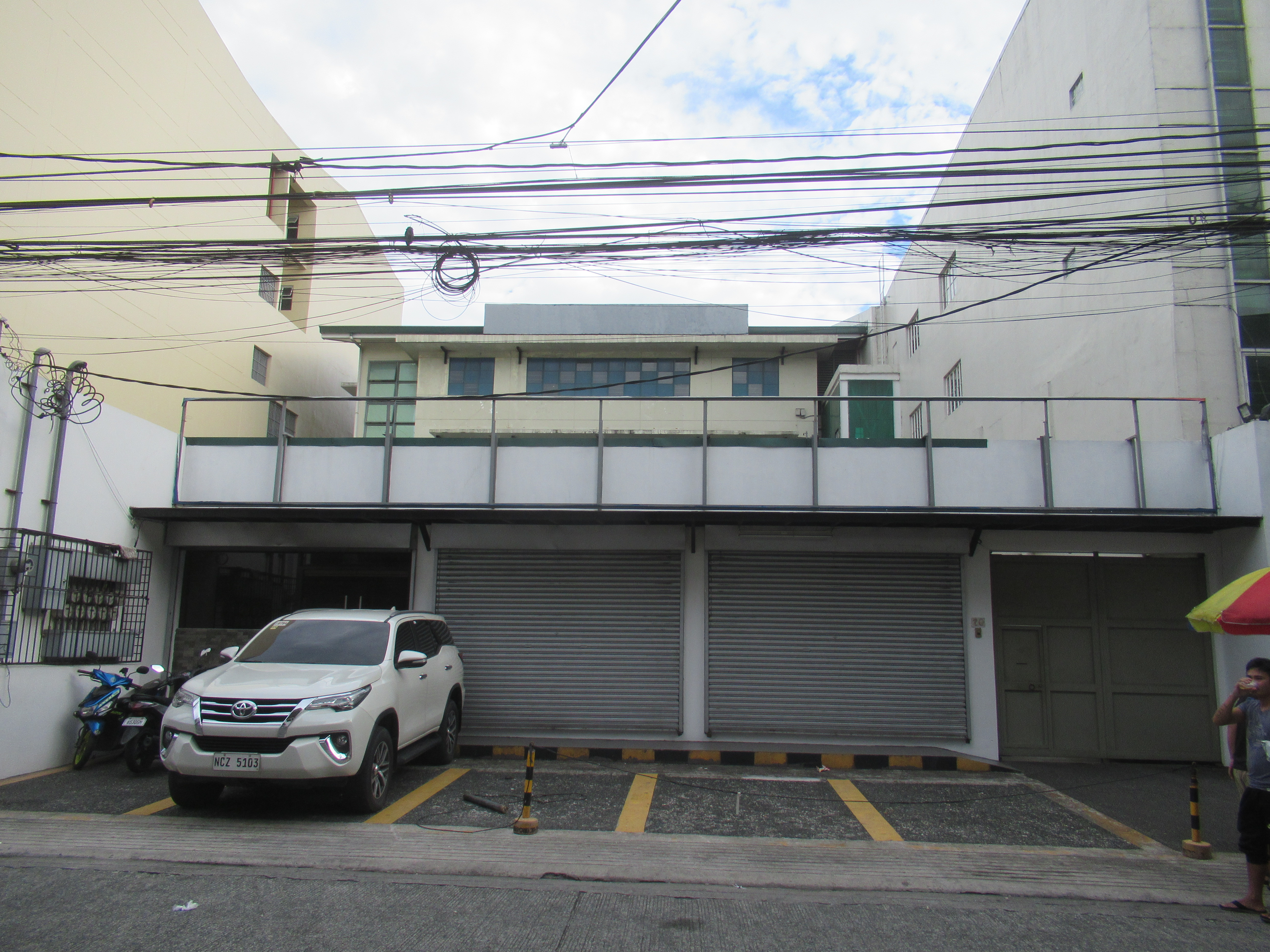
- Facade
- Active: 2000–2022
- Founder: Dr. Jose V. Abueva
- President: MA. Oliva Z. Domingo, DPA
- Vice-president: Virginia S. Cariño, Ph.D. (VP for Student and Alumni Affairs)
- Location: No. 22 Manga Road, cor. Aurora Blvd., Quezon City, Metro Manila, Philippines; 14°37′4.81″N 121°2′32.91″E
- Campus: Urban
- Website: www.kalayaan.edu.ph
- Location in Metro Manila Location in Luzon Location in the Philippines

Kalayaan College (or KC) was a private, non-sectarian higher education institution formerly located in Marikina that has since moved to Quezon City. It was established in 2000. On July 4, 2022, Kalayaan College ended its operations after 22 years due to financial losses.

Kalayaan College

Kalayaan College was on Manga Road cor Aurora Blvd, near the Line 2 Betty Go-Belmonte. It was established by notable academics. For example, the college's president, Dr. José Abueva, is a former president of the University of the Philippines (UP).

The college followed UP's curriculum, such as the grading system for students (where 1.00 is the highest and 5.00 is the lowest or failing grade). Most of the professors were members of UP's faculty or UP graduates.

== Bachelor courses ==
=== Bachelor in Science courses ===
Kalayaan College's Bachelor in Science courses included Business Administration, Hospitality Management, Computer Science, and Psychology.

=== Bachelor in the Arts courses ===
KC's Bachelor in the Arts courses included Psychology, Journalism, and Literature.

=== Other Bachelor courses ===
Kalayaan College had bachelor courses in Public Administration, Early Childhood Care and Development, Fine Arts (Major in Studio Arts /Visual Communication).

== Other courses ==
Kalayaan College offered programs such as Associate in Arts and Sciences, Associate in Computer Technology, and Certificate in Fine Arts.
