= Commonwealth High School =

- Paaralang Sekundarya ng Commonwealth

Location
- Ecols St., Barangay Commonwealth; Quezon City; Philippines
- Coordinates: 14°41′56.23″N 121°4′53.86″E

Information
- Other names: Comm-High, Komhay, CHS
- Former names: San Francisco High School - Commonwealth Annex, Don Mariano Marcos High School
- Type: Public National Secondary School, Non-Sectarian
- Motto: Building New Horizons
- Established: July 14, 1986; 39 years ago
- Grades: 7 to 12
- Enrollment: approx. 4000
- Colors: Maroon and White
- Song: Commonwealth Hymn
- Affiliation: Division of City Schools-Quezon City

Commonwealth High School is a public high school in Commonwealth, Quezon City, the Philippines.

== Overview ==
Commonwealth High School (CHS) is a duly recognized national secondary school of the Division of City Schools in Quezon City. Since 1986, it has served at least four barangays, providing equal opportunities to quality education.

== History ==
The school's history began on July 14, 1986, when the first secondary school in Barangay Commonwealth was inaugurated. Classes were held in an improvised room or cubicles in the chapel with student population of over 800.

In March 1988 the school was moved to a temporary site – a part of Doña Juana Elementary School in Barangay Holy Spirit, Quezon City. The school was housed in a four-room pre-fabricated structure, built by the city government and in a two-room structure built through the assistance of the Chinese Chamber of Commerce.

On June 20, 1991, SFHS – Commonwealth Annex was finally transferred to a 1.7-hectare lot located at Ecols Street, Barangay Commonwealth, Quezon City.

In June 1995, the school gained its independence from its mother school and finally named Commonwealth High School. It was also then called Don Mariano Marcos High School.
