= Francisca del Espíritu Santo Fuentes =

Filipino nun and Venerable

Venerable Francisca del Espíritu Santo OP
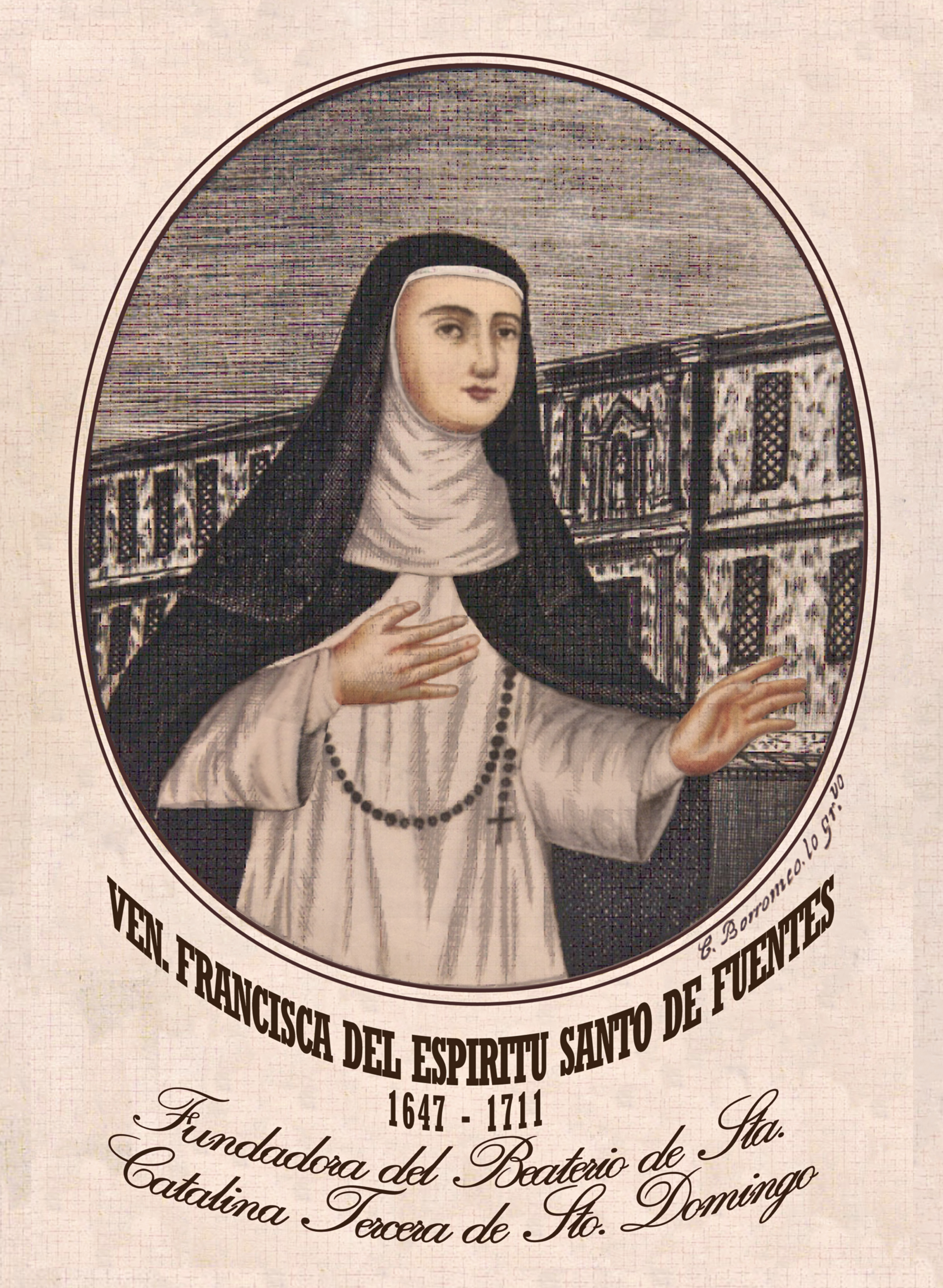
- Born: Francisca Fuentes; 1647; Manila, Captaincy General of the Philippines
- Died: August 24, 1711 (aged 63–64); Intramuros, Manila, Captaincy General of the Philippines

Francisca del Espíritu Santo de Fuentes (1647 – August 24, 1711) was a Filipino Roman Catholic religious sister. She became the first prioress of the Congregation of the Dominican Sisters of St. Catherine of Siena in the Philippines.

== Life ==
Francísca de Fuentes y del Castillo was born to Don Simón de Fuentes, a Spaniard and Doña Ana María del Castillo y Tamayo, a Spanish mestiza from Manila around 1647 (no record of her birth is found). Francisca grew up to be a fine lady, and she was given in marriage to a gentleman who died shortly thereafter leaving her a childless, young widow.

Francísca then dedicated her time to prayer and social service helping many poor and sick in the city. In 1682 she became a Dominican tertiary, taking the name "Francísca del Espíritu Santo".

In 1686, Francísca, Antonia de Jesús Esquerra, María Ana de Fuentes (Francisca's blood-sister), Maria Ana de la Vega, and Sebastiana Salcedo requested that they be allowed to live together in a life of prayer and the practice of the virtues while continuing their social apostolate. After a brief hesitation, their request was sent to the Master General of Order of Preachers in Rome, who approved it in January 1688.

Meanwhile, the director of the Third Order, Rev Juan de Santa María, who favored the request of the ladies, was assigned to Bataan, and Rev Juan de Santo Domingo was assigned in his place. The new Director was against the project and the proposal was laid aside. Francísca and her companion were deeply dismayed, but Sebastiana prophesied that although she and Antonia would not live to see it, the Beaterio would be a reality.

Francisca's desire for the realization of the Beaterio also grew. (A beaterio is a house in which devout women live, forming a community and following a rule.) Fr. Juan de Santo Domingo reconsidered and became one of the powerful supporters of the Beaterio. Under his direction, Mother Francísca and her companions lived at first in the house of Antonia de Esguerra who had by then died.

== The establishment of the Spanish beaterio in Manila ==
The cause for the beatification of Madre Jeronima de la Asuncion, foundress of the Spanish Monastery of Sta. Clara in which one of the main witness was the Dominican Friar Jeronimo de Belen, seemed to have inspired the Order of Preachers to start their own monastery for Spanish women. The provincial chapter resolved to do so on 17 April 1633. "Those who enter this convent should all be Spanish ladies and not in any way (Spanish) half-breeds, in order to have more confidence that the nuns would persevere in their good intentions." Santa Clara Monastery, however, objected to another foundation identical to it on the grounds that public alms were insufficient to support two convents for women in the city. The Franciscans with the Poor Clares appealed to the king who eventually sided with them in a decree dated 16 February 1635 commanding the Dominicans to desist from their plans.

== Inauguration of the Beaterio de Sta. Catalina ==
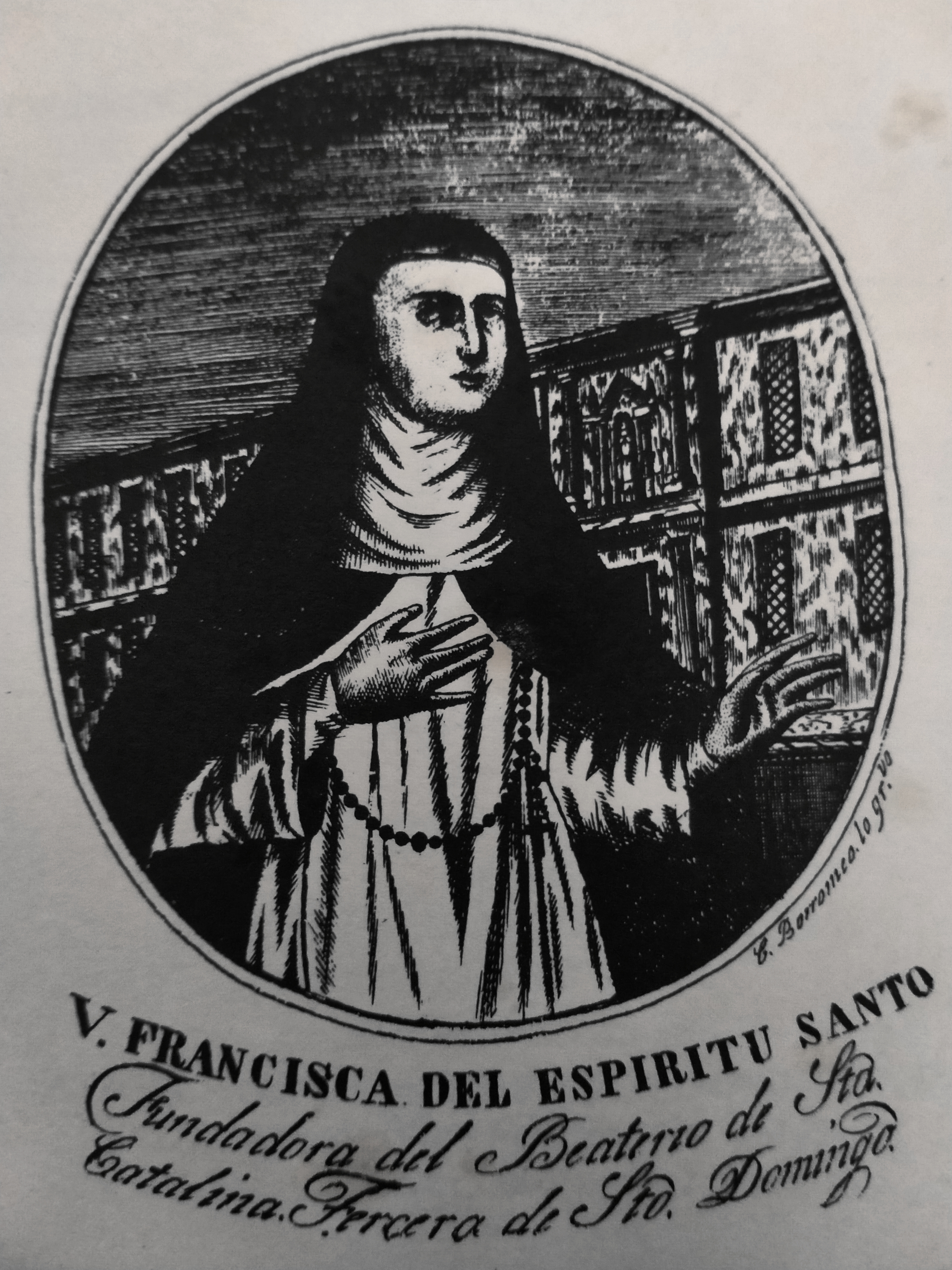
Drawing of Mother Francisca de Fuentes by C. Borromeo, c. 1858, in F. Gainza, Manual de los Hermanos y Hermanas de la Tercera Orden.

At long last, the Beaterio de Sta. Catalina de Sena de las Hermanas de Penitencia de la Tercera Orden was formally inaugurated on 26 July 1696, the feast of St. Anne. Mother Francisca del Espiritu Santo became prioress for life. Considered as the co-founders were Fray Juan de Sto. Domingo, Don Juan de Escaño, Mother Lorenza, Mother Juana, Mother Rosa and Mother Maria del Espiritu Santo, the surviving Spanish beatas in the Esguerra house.

Unfortunately, it was specified in the foundation papers that there would only be Fifteen choir sisters of Spanish blood in honor of the fifteen mysteries of the rosary. As in the Monastery of Santa Clara, the inevitable question came up as to what to do with the Filipina applicants who were also begging for admission to the Beaterio de Santa Catalina. After some deliberation, the founders of Santa Catalina determined in 1699 that, to begin with, five native women could be accommodated as "Sisters of obedience" (hermanas de la obediencia). Although permitted to take simple vows, they were to be deprived of voting rights, barred from holding office, and charged with the menial tasks in the convent. For devotional names, they could adopt the names of the angels and saints or religious concepts other than the mysteries of the holy rosary, which reserved only for those of the Spanish race. This distinction would continue until well into the 19th century.

Also called "legas" the Filipino beatas offered special testimony to the monastic spirit of total humility. Paradoxically, had she lived longer, Mother Sebastiana, a native-who helped lay the beaterio's strong foundation and was the one who predicted there would be fifteen members-would not have qualified as a full member herself. Perhaps she foresaw this paradox, too, but kept it to herself

== Conflict over the installation of a beaterio ==
The initial beguinage experienced many complications, and was caught in jurisdictional conflicts between the archbishop and the Dominicans, financing issues and an unclear status. After seven years of existence, scandals began to mar the image of a few of the Spanish beatas who were admitted at the start of the eighteenth century. Defying the rules of the beaterio, they, including a certain Sor Jacinta, goddaughter of Fray Juan de Sto. Domingo, OP, the co-founder, began to live separately in private homes. To the residents of the Walled City, it was unseemly for beatas to go out and worse, stay out of the beaterio without any compelling reason to do so. The Escano bequest had spared them from having to beg alms for their subsistence, unlike the poor beatas of the Compania. Inevitably, the two beaterios were now being compared with each other. On the other hand, the growing community, counting about twenty-four members in 1703, seven of whom were Filipina lay Sisters, had decided to build a bigger edifice to accommodate new applicants and helpers.

The situation stirred up legalistic issues regarding beaterios, which agitated canon and civil law experts no end, their opinions depending, not surprisingly, on which faction they belonged to. Caught unwittingly in the middle of the controversy were the beatas in whose name the war of words and documents were being waged. Concluding that the Dominicans had been unable to maintain discipline among the beatas, Archbishop Camacho of Manila claimed jurisdiction over the institution and insisted on the practice of closure. The Dominican provincial protested that the authority of the master general of their Order was sufficient to justify the existence of the beaterio and that it enjoyed prior exemption from the closure which was a later requirement of the Council of Trent.

Manila Archbishop Diego Camacho y Ávila wanted the Beatrio put under his jurisdiction. The beatas, upon the advice of their Dominican counselors, refused obedience to the archbishop who was left with no other recourse but to excommunicate them. In the beginning of 1704, the beatas chose to dissolve their community and live as a group of laywomen in exile at the College of Santa Potenciana whose premises were courteously offered by the governor.

Henceforth, they were dispensed from their vows, divested of their habits and deprived of their religious names. Their "Babylonian exile" lasted for two years and three months from January 1704 to April 1706. During this period, Sor Jacinta, whose laxity triggered the upheaval, was expelled and four other unnamed Spanish beatas left the fold. The fact that the Filipino lay Sisters tended to "persevere in their good intentions" more than the Spanish Sisters ran counter to the assumptions of the Dominican Chapter of 1663. The Archbishop later relented and with a permit dated 26 March 1706, allowed Mother Francicsca and her sister to return to their original home, having donned once more their Dominican habits, where they lived under the rules set for them as beatas, with a few added features of their religious life as prescribed by the Archbishop.

With Francisca at the time of their return were fifteen Spanish sisters including a novice, and in addition, there were lay Sisters and a girl who eventually donned the habit. It was in the same year that the Beaterio became a Convent School for Spanish girls, mestizas and natives, instructing them in the four R's: religion, reading, writing and arithmetic with music, embroidery, flower making, etc.

== Slavery in the Beaterio de Sta. Catalina de Sena ==
Painting of Mother Francisca.

Among the earliest companions of Francisca was a Spanish young lady named Rosa Prieto who was a slave owner. Her father, Captain Bartolome Prieto had arranged her to be married to a certain man. She ran away to the convent to escape this arranged marriage. She was received by Francisca and was invested with the habit by Fr. Juan de Sto. Domingo. Her father, Captain Bartolome Prieto was a friend of the beatas. On a separate occasion, Father Juan de Sto. Domingo had used the services of these slaves to fix the yard and the stores owned by the Dominican Friars in Parian: "the captain helped me in putting the yard in order with the help of his slaves and servants who also repaired the stores of the Parian. May Give him glory. Amen." (The Cradle Years of the Dominican Sisters in the Philippines by Juan de Sto. Domingo, OP, published July 26, 1996). Years before, in his royal decree, August 9, 1589, Philip II instructed the Governor General: "it is advisable to remedy this...and I therefore commit upon your arrival at the islands, you shall set liberty all those Indians held as slaves by the Spaniards. This decree was strengthened by a bull of Pope Gregory XIV, issued at Rome on April 18, 1591, who had ordered to free all slaves in the Philippines and threatened to excommunicate those persons who would not liberate their slaves. Apparently, both Pope Gregory XIV and King Philip II were ignored by the leaders of the Beaterio de Sta. Catalina de Sena.

== Death ==
Francisca del Espíritu Santo Fuentes died at 3:00 p.m. of August 24, 1711 at the age of 63. She was buried at the gospel side of the chapel of Colegio de San Juan de Letran. She left behind the Beaterio de Santa Catalina de Siena (Sta. Catalina College) which still stands to this day as the Congregation of the Dominican Sisters of St. Catherine of Siena.

Fuentes was named a "Servant of God" on March 11, 2003. Pope Francis declared her "Venerable" in 2019.

In 2011, on the 300th anniversary of her death, the Postal Service of the Republic of the Philippines issued a stamp in Mother Francisca's honor. There is a historical marker regarding Mother Francisca on Muralla Street in Intramuros, Manila.

As of 2019, there were about 50 communities of the Dominican Sisters of Saint Catherine of Siena in the Philippines and the United States (and a presence in Italy).

== See also ==
- List of Filipinos venerated in the Catholic Church
- Dominican Sisters of St. Catherine of Siena

== Sources ==
- Trinity College Website
- "Mother Francisca del Espiritu Santo, OP: Process for beatification and canonization to begin today at the Santo Domingo Church in Quezon City". Manila Bulletin. July 7, 2003. Archived from the original on 2011-08-09 – via HighBeam Research.
- Faithweb.com
- Index
