= Lagro High School =

Coordinates: 14.7274°N 121.0670°E

- Paaralang Sekundariya ng Lagro

Location
- Misa de Gallo St. cor. Ascension Ave., Barangay Greater Lagro, Novaliches; Quezon City, Metro Manila; Philippines

Information
- Type: Public
- Established: 1974 (Novaliches), 1978 (Lagro)
- Principal: Zaida M. Padullo
- Enrollment: 6,000
- Campus: Urban
- Nickname: Lagronian
- Affiliations: National Public High Schools of Quezon City
- Website: www.lagrohighschool.com

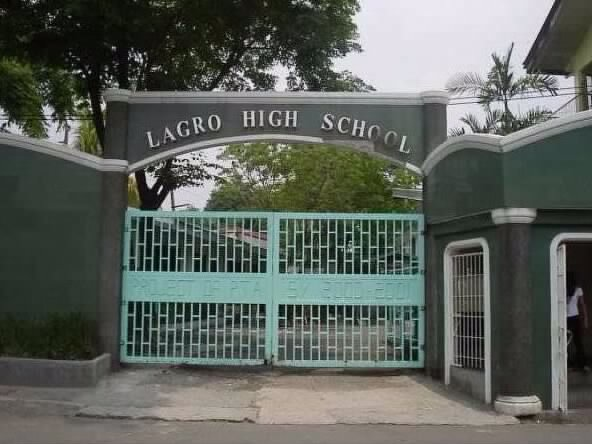
The Lagro High Gate

Lagro High School (Tagalog: Paaralang Sekundarya ng Lagro) is a public high school in the Lagro District of Quezon City in Metro Manila, Philippines. The school was founded as Novaliches High School in 1974 by the local homeowners association, and inaugurated as Lagro High School in 1978. Current enrollment is about six thousand students.

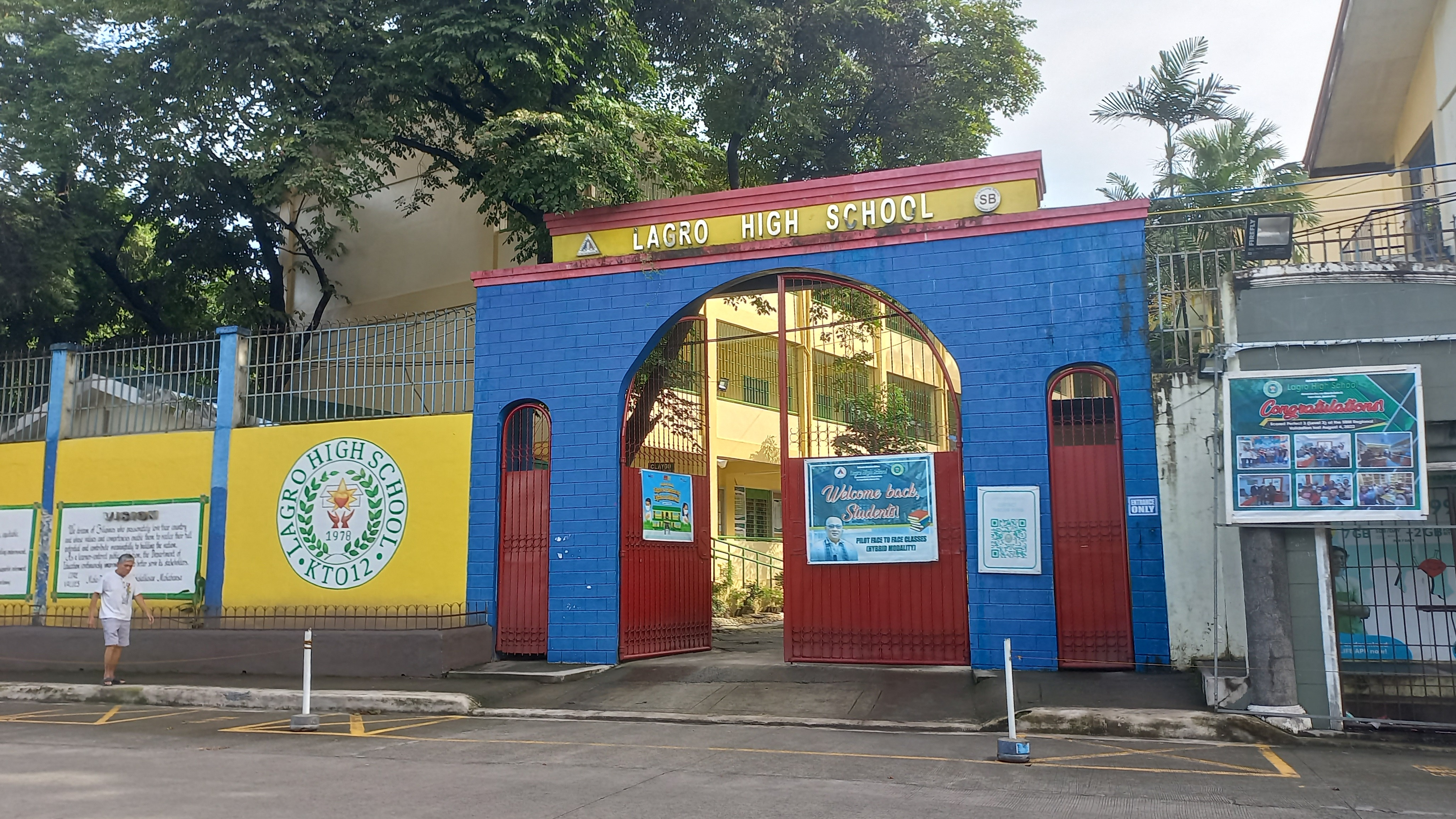
Gate

== History ==
In the early 1970s, the GSIS La Mesa Homeowners Association (GLAMEHA) requested that a high school be established in the Lagro subdivision next to their elementary school. The city government and education bureau helped establish a high school annex out of two housing units of Lagro Block 59. On June 13, 1974, Novaliches High School opened with an enrollment of 87 students. Florencio Dumlao served as the principal. In August, the annex was transferred to share the Lagro Elementary School compound, with a new principal and three teachers. Its first graduation took place on March 1, 1976.

In 1977-78, the school had an enrollment of 774, and in June 1978, it expanded to a 1.3-hectare (3.2-acre) site with an annex building consisting of two stories and 18 classrooms. On September 1, 1978, the school was inaugurated as Lagro High School. A six-room building was added to the southern part of the campus. Other annex buildings were either constructed or acquired, including the Patayas annex in 1987, Fairview in 1993, and the SB Building in 2003.

As the only high school in the Northern Metro Manila, Southern Bulacan, and Western Rizal region, the number of students attending Lagro High School has grown over the years. As of 2011, the school has had an enrollment of about 6,000 students.

== Notable programs and extra-curriculars ==
- The LHS Courier (English) & Lagro Pahatid (Filipino), LHS's official school paper is only published twice a year. Students regularly participate in the National Schools Press Conference (NSPC), which is a national competition.
- Lagro High School implemented the nationwide Special Program in the Arts (SPA) during the school year of 2005-2006. The program offered five different courses: theater arts, visual arts, creative writing, music and dance. A sixth class, media arts, was implemented in the 2007-08 year. Students showcase their talents in an annual exhibition and performance.

== Notable alumni ==
- Rachelle Anne Cabral, An archer for Philippines team in 2012 London Olympics
