= Cecilia Espenilla =

Filipino Dominican nun

Reverend Mother Maria Cecilia Espenilla O.P.
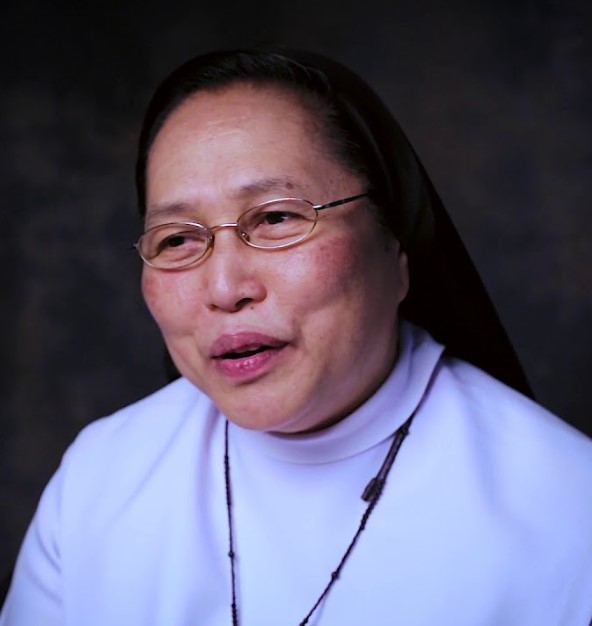
- Title: General Prioress (14 December 2021–present)

Personal life
- Born: Cecilia Alcantara Espenilla; December 3, 1960 (age 65) Masbate, Philippines

Religious life
- Religion: Catholic Church
- Order: Dominican Sisters of Saint Catherine of Siena

Senior posting
- Present post: Main Animator, Talitha Kumi Philippines (2016–present); Chairperson, Arise Philippines (2020–present); Co-chairperson, Conference of Major Superiors of the Philippines (2022–present)
- Previous post: International Promoter of Justice, Peace, and Integrity of Creation (2017–2020) – Dominican Sisters International

Maria Cecilia Alcantara Espenilla, OP (born December 3, 1960) is a Filipino Roman Catholic religious sister, human rights activist and the current Prioress General of the Dominican Sisters of Saint Catherine of Siena. From 2017 to 2020, she worked as the International Promoter of Justice, Peace and Integrity of Creation (JPIC) of the Dominican Sisters International Confederation.

== Biography ==
Espenilla was born in Masbate, Philippines to a devout Catholic household. Her father was a government official and her mother was a school teacher. She was the seventh of eight children in the family: 5 boys and 3 girls. The second eldest became a diocesan priest.

In 1975, before entering religious life in the Dominican Sisters of Saint Catherine of Siena, Espenilla worked in the First United Bank in Manila. After her formation, she was assigned in various roles and responsibilities as Religion and Values Education teacher, School Treasurer, Principal and President of the College. She obtained her bachelor's degree in accountancy at the University of Santo Tomas and earned a degree in theological studies from Ateneo de Manila University.

In 2013 and 2014, Espenilla attended the sessions of the Commission on the Status of Women (CSW57 and CSW58) at the United Nations Headquarters in New York City representing Dominican Sisters International (DSI) Coordinator for Asia-Pacific. In 2016, she was accepted as one of the 8 Fellows of the Center for Women of Faith and Leadership (CWFL) at the Institute for Global Engagement (IGE) in Washington, D.C. She was invited as one of the main speakers to the 26th session of the Commission on Crime Prevention and Criminal Justice (CCPCJ) at the United Nations in Vienna, where she presented the topic "Human Trafficking: How Demand Creates Supply". Also in 2016, she was elected as the main animator of Talitha Kumi Philippines, an organization of consecrated religious that aims to counter human trafficking and abuses.

From September 2017 until October 2020, Espenilla was appointed as the International Promoter of Justice, Peace, and Integrity of Creation for the Dominican Sisters International (DSI). During her tenure, she advocated efforts and focus on ending human trafficking, encouraging religious communities around the world in getting involved in justice initiatives on an international and national level.

Since October 2020, Espenilla took the leading role in Arise Philippines, a pioneer of the local and international anti-trafficking movement. In July 2022, she was elected, together with the Claretian priest Elias Ayuban Jr., as co-chairperson of the Conference of Major Superiors of the Philippines (CMSP).
