= Dominican Sisters of St. Catherine of Siena =

- Established: July 26, 1696
- Founder: Fr. Juan de Sto. Domingo, OP and Mother Francisca del Espiritu Santo de fuentes
- Founded at: Intramuros, Manila Philippines
- Headquarters: General Curia; Quezon City, Philippines
- Region served: Europe, Asia, Americas and Africa
- Prioress General: Mother Cecilia Espenilla, OP (2021–present)
- Affiliations: Roman Catholic

The Congregation of the Dominican Sisters of St. Catherine of Siena (Spanish: Beaterio de Sta. Catalina de Sena de las Hermanas de Penitencia de la Tercera Orden) is a Dominican congregation of religious sisters under the patronage of Catherine of Siena. It was founded by Fr Juan de Sto. Domingo, OP and Mother Francisca del Espiritu Santo de Fuentes in 1696 for Spanish women.

== History ==
Francísca de Fuentes was a Spanish young widow in Manila, who devoted her time to prayer and helping the poor and sick. In 1682 she became a lay Dominican. Her date of birth is unknown.

In 1686, Francísca de Fuentes, Antonia de Jesús Esquerra, Maria Ana de la Vega (daughter of a Cebuana) and Sebastiana Salcedo (native of Pasig) requested that they be allowed to live together in a community and live in a life of prayer and the practice of the virtues while continuing their social apostolate to Fr. Juan de Sta. Maria, the Prior of the Convent of Santo Domingo and Fr. Bartolome Marron, the ex-Prior. Fr. Juan de Sta. Maria sent a petition for a permit for the sisters to live together in Community to the Very Rev. Master General of the Order, Rev. Fr. Antonino Cloche. The latter granted the petition, confirmed and approved that a House of the Sisters of the Third Order be established in the City of Manila, signed in the Convent of Sta. Maria de la Minerva in Rome on January 11, 1688, with the Confirmation of the Acts of the Province of the Holy Rosary with Fr. Bartolome Marron as Prior Provincial.

In 1690, due to some pressing needs, Fr. Juan de Sta. Maria was sent to Bataan to learn the native language. Fr. Juan de Sto. Domingo succeeded him as Prior of the Convent of Santo Domingo. Mother Francisca urged Fr. Juan de Sto. Domingo about the order and because he was of contrary opinion he persistently answered “No”. One day after hearing her confession, she came to press him again. In anger he told her that she was “impertinente” and would not give in to his reasons. With courage, Francisca answered him in these words: “Fr. Prior, the Beaterio will be constructed and Your Reverence will see it.” He was opposed to it considering how much is needed to sustain a community, however small it is. Fr. Juan de Sto. Domingo, upon hearing such words of determination, got confused and could not say anything. The next day, after hearing her confession, he asked her, whether what she told him with such determination was a revelation or a dictate of the Holy Spirit. Mother Francisca remained quiet.

Initially, the new local director of the Third Order, Rev. Juan de Santo Domingo was not enthusiastic, but later came to reconsider and gave his approval. As testified by Fr. Juan de Sto. Domingo everything happened as she had said it would, and saw so much of it that actually he did everything. And the Lord willed that he finished the passageway to San Juan de Letran.

Sebastiana died in 1692 and Mother Antonia in 1694. They did not live to see the order established in 1696 as they predicted. Nevertheless, they, with Mother Francisca are considered the nucleus of the foundation of the order. In July 1963, three years before the formal foundation of the order, the two professed sisters, Francisca de Fuentes and Antonia de Fuentes had manifested their concern for the temporal needs of their association.

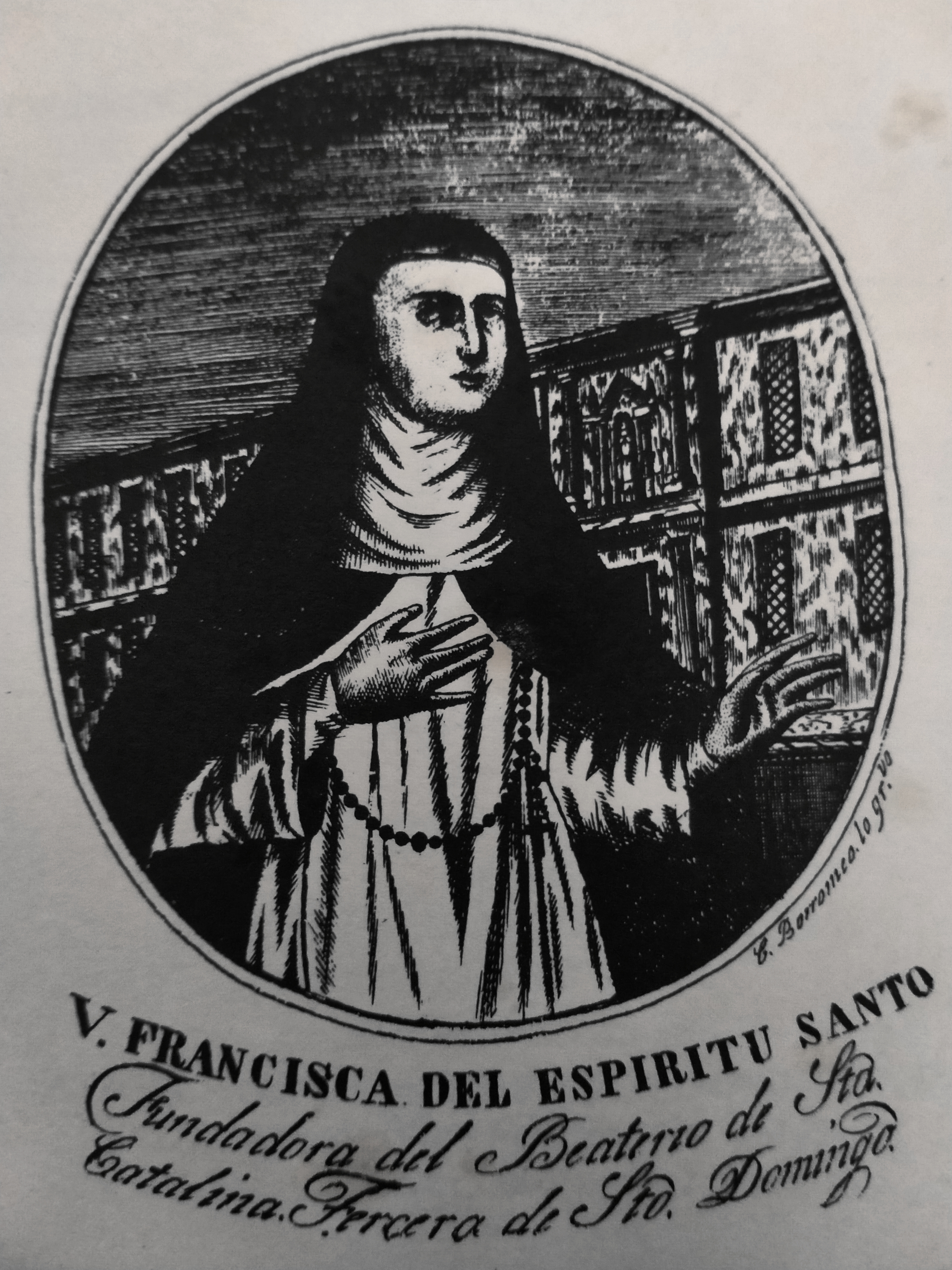
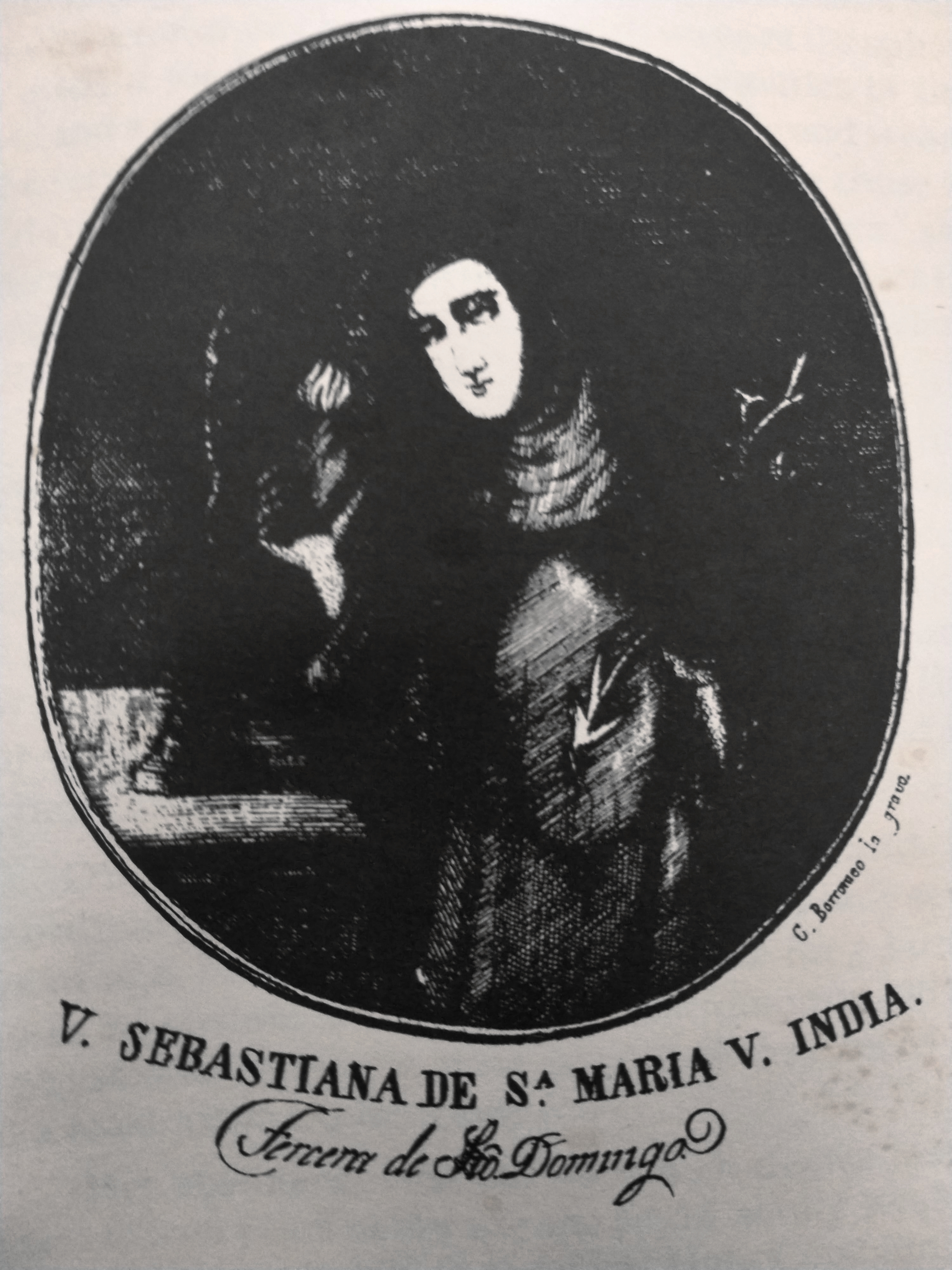
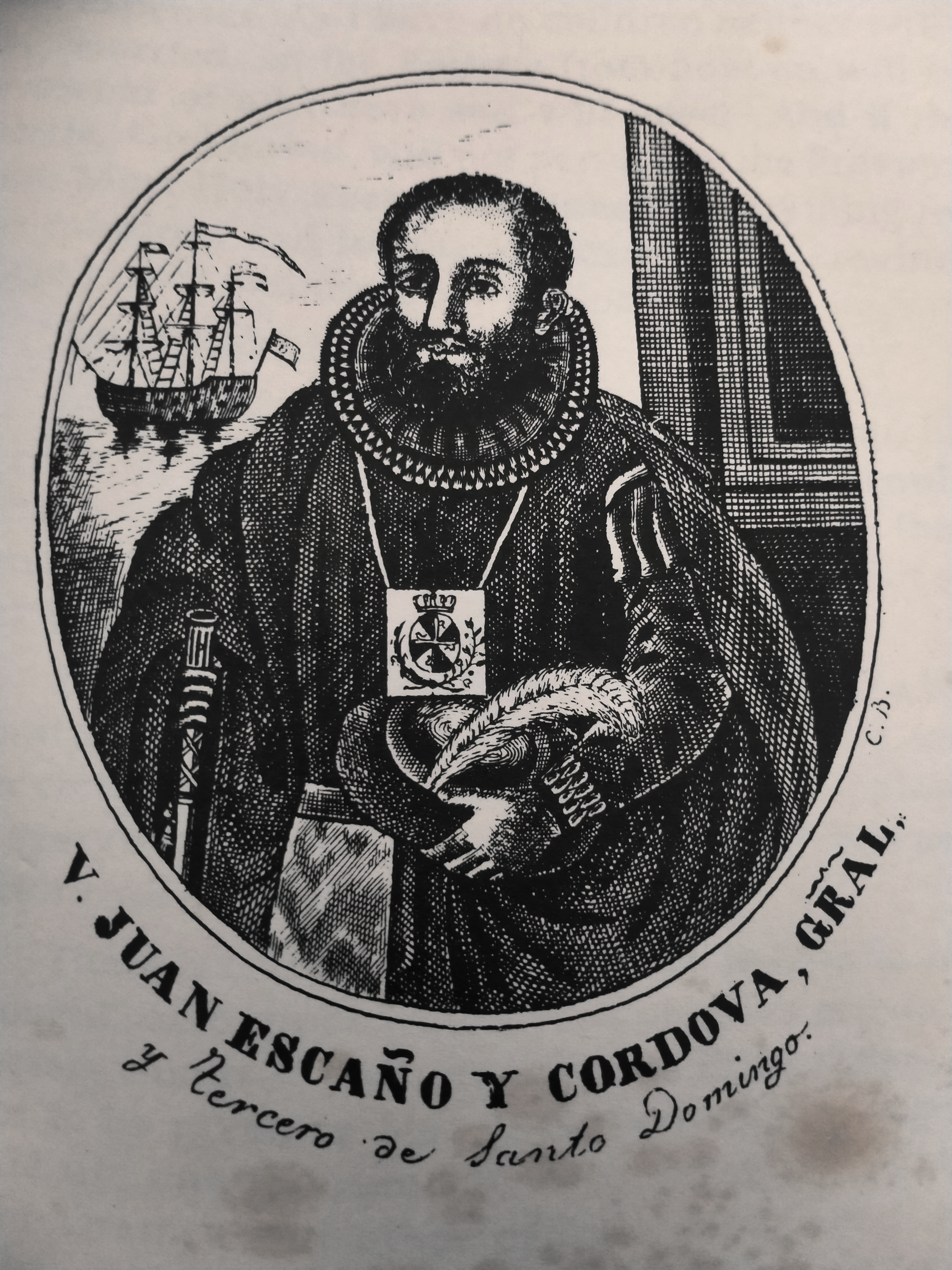
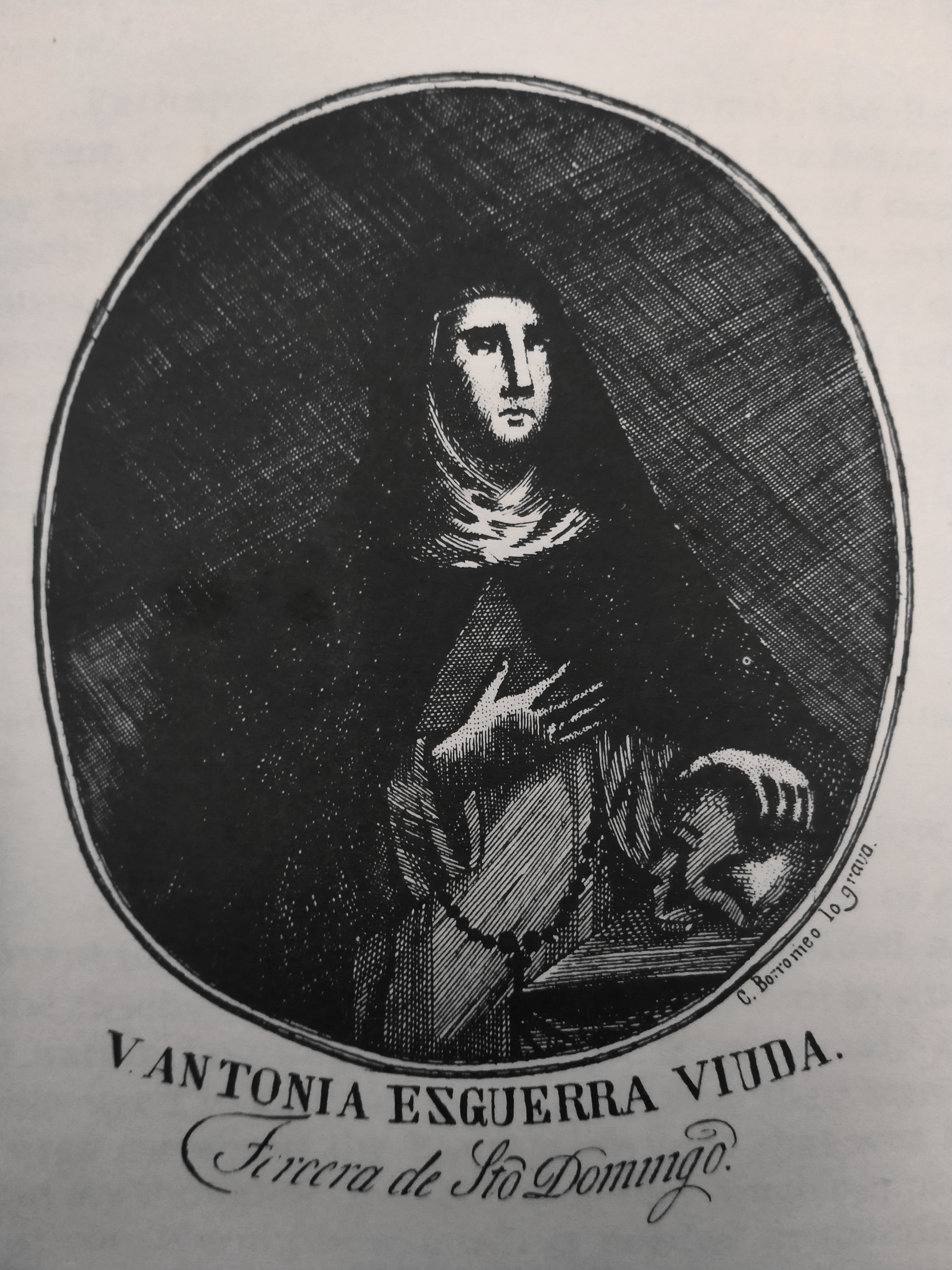
Clockwise from top left: Drawings of Mother Francisca del Espiritu Santo, Hermana Sebastiana de Jesus, Mother Antonio de Jesus Maria and Juan de Escaño Cordova by C. Borromeo, c. 1858, in F. Gainza, Manual de los Hermanos y Hermanas de la Tercera Orden.

Soon after the death of Mother Antonia, Fr. Juan de Sto. Domingo gave the habit to Lorenza Lopez and Juana de Sma. Trinidad. So the three sisters, including Mother Francisca, lived in that house as in a convent, thus laying the foundation of the order.

At first, Francísca and her companions lived in the house of Antonia de Esguerra who had by then died. On 26 July 1696 the Beaterio de Sta. Catalina de Sena de las Hermanas de Penitencia de la Tercera Orden was definitively established with the profession of vows of Mother Francisca and nine (9) other sisters. Francísca de Fuentes was named prioress and took the name Mother Francisca del Espiritu Santo.

There were other young women who asked to be admitted like: Jacinta, of Spanish-Japanese descent. At this point, there were already five sisters. With the assurance of Fr. Gregorio Giraldez, the Procurator General, he procured a house adjoined to the first, renovated it to become the oratory where the sisters could assemble together to pray. As. Fr. Juan de Sto. Domingo stated, ‘the Beaterio was being formed without the intention of founding it, and the things of God come to light.”

It is known as the Beaterio de Sta. Catalina de Sena in Intramuros, Manila. It was specified in the order's foundation papers that there would be only fifteen choir sisters of Spanish blood in honor of the fifteen mysteries of the rosary. The Dominican Chapter of April 17, 1633, mandated "that those who enter the convent should all be Spanish women and not in any way mestizos." (Fr. Rolando de la Rosa, OP, Beginnings of the Filipino Dominicans 2014).

== Slaveholding ==
Among the earliest companions of Francisca was a Spanish young lady named Rosa Prieto who was a slave owner. Her father, Captain Bartolome Prieto had arranged her to be married to a certain man. She ran away to the convent to escape this arranged marriage. She was received by Francisca and was invested with the habit by Fr. Juan de Sto. Domingo. Her father, Captain Bartolome Prieto was a friend of the sisters. On a separate occasion, Father Juan de Sto. Domingo had used the services of these slaves to fix the yard and the stores owned by the Dominican Friars in Parian: "the captain helped me in putting the yard in order with the help of his slaves and servants who also repaired the stores of the Parian. May Give him glory. Amen." (). Years before, in his royal decree, August 9, 1589, Philip II instructed the Governor General: "it is advisable to remedy this...and I therefore commit upon your arrival at the islands, you shall set liberty all those Indians held as slaves by the Spaniards. This decree was strengthened by a bull of Pope Gregory XIV, issued at Rome on April 18, 1591 who had ordered to free all slaves in the Philippines and threatened to excommunicate those persons who would not liberate their slaves. Apparently, both Pope Gregory XIV and King Philip II were ignored by the leaders of the Dominican Sisters of St. Catherine.

== Midlife turmoil ==
In 1746, Sister Cecilia de la Circuncision, whose secular name was Ita y Salazar, had withdrawn to Santa Catalina to avoid marrying an elderly uncle and professed sixteen years previously. Now entering middle age, she fell in love with, of all men, Don Francisco Figuerora, the secretary of the governor-general. The acting governor then happened to be a Dominican friar, Bishop Juan de Arechedrra of Nueva Segovia. Mother Cecilia turned to the vicar general of the archdiocese, sede vacante, to declare her vows null and void. The vicar convinced her that this was not the best time to press her case.

The time finally came in 1750 when the new governor, the Marques de Obando arrived and there was also a new archbishop, Fray Pedro de la Santisima Trinidad who was a Franciscan. The prelate ruled in favor of the Spanish sister on the basis of the royal orders, which repeatedly forbade the order. Over the protests of the Dominicans, Sister Cecilia was able to leave the community borne on a hammock muttering of some illness. But now she was free to marry Figueroa. The couple later transferred to Mexico where Cecilia's case was upheld by the archbishop there. When the report of their infringement of royal laws reached the king of Spain, he decreed, as punishment, the extinction of the order upon the death of the remaining sisters. This gave the Dominicans ample time to move heaven and earth to have the royal order rescinded. In the meantime, the governor trained his critical gaze at other orders to ensure that they, too, would comply with the king's edicts or face the threat of extinction-at least during his incumbency. The royal decree suppressing the order was finally lifted after the war about 1769.

== Changes and complications ==
In 1865, the Dominican priests began recruiting Spanish nuns for the Asian missions. They were to be housed temporarily in the order while waiting to be transported to their respective assignments. Unfortunately, their efforts to set up religious houses in Spain to train missionary nuns was not successful because of lack of funds and vocations. Hence, the Spanish nuns remained permanently in the order occupying the principal offices since the Filipina members were mere lay sisters. In the last decade of the nineteenth century, however, in order to accord full membership to Filipino applicants from choice families, the order extended the definition of "Spanish mestiza" to the broadest possible meaning of the word. The community began to accept not only Spanish "half-breeds", but also those families had been classified as "Spanish mestizos" for generations, regardless of the proportion of Spanish blood flowing in their veins.

Under this mitigated policy were admitted two Filipinas as choir sisters who were to figure eminently in the development of the order. It was only in 1917 that the Filipino lay sisters gained the status of choir sisters more than two centuries and a half after the inauguration of the order. During his canonical visit to the Philippines in that year, the Dominican master general, Father Ludovicus Theissling, OP, a Dutch, noted the wide discrepancy in status between the Spanish and Filipina Dominicans. This was two decades after the Spanish colonizers had left and even the Royal Monastery of Santa Clara had opened the door of its cloisters to Filipina applicants. Led by Mothers Catalina Osmena and Felomena Medalle, the Filipina sisters petitioned the highest official of the Order to grant them full membership to native aspirants who were at least high school graduates regardless of their racial background. The master general readily gave justice to their request. Inevitably, the polarization between the Filipina and the Spanish sisters-which paralleled that between the Filipino secular clergy and the Spanish religious Orders during the colonial regime-led to the division of the order in 1933.

The Spanish sisters, without consulting the Filipina sisters, formed a new community, the Congregacion de Religiosas Missioneras de Santo Domingo, currently the provincial house is located in Sampaloc, Manila. When the plans were officially disclosed, the surprised Filipinas, including the criollas and the mestizas, except for a few, opted not to join the Spaniards. They chose to remain in the order and to preserve their institutional identity, this time under diocesan authority. A few of the Sapniards decided to stay in the order with the Filipinas. The Spanish Dominican priests of the Most holy Rosary allowed the Filipinas to retain their old edifice in the Walled City. In startling contrast, however, they gave the new Spanish congregation all the other houses of the order in the Philippines, China, Japan and Taiwan, numbering to seventeen. Thus, the order was unexpectedly deprived of their mission field.

The Filipino nuns refrained from protesting the unequal partition. "The Lord giveth and the Lord taketh away. Blessed be the name of the Lord!". The order's historian, Sister Maria Luisa Henson 1904-1995), expresses the sentiments of her sisters regarding this sad episode in their development: We, of the order, were the first daughters of the province of the Most Holy Rosary, and worked side by side with the Dominican Fathers in the missions. But during the crucial moment in 1933, we were abandoned and disappointed by the then Provincial Administration under Father (Ricardo) Vaquero (1931–1934). When two daughters separate from the father, do they not get equal share? Perhaps, the Father Provincial Vaquero was angry because we did not join the Spaniards. (Davis 1990,88) The only building allotted to the Filipina Dominicans, newly remodeled and reconstructed through the generosity of Mother Catalina Osmena, was bombed to the ground by Japanese invaders.
