= Pamantasan ng Lungsod ng Maynila (disambiguation) =

The Pamantasan ng Lungsod ng Maynila (University of the City of Manila) may refer to different educational institutions, such as:

== Pamantasan ng Lungsod ng Maynila System ==
- Pamantasan ng Lungsod ng Maynila, Intramuros
- Pamantasan ng Lungsod ng Maynila, District Colleges
- Pamantasan ng Lungsod ng Maynila, Open University

== Other unrelated institutions with the name "Manila University" on their titles ==
- Ateneo de Manila University
- Manila Central University
- Universidad de Manila
- University of Manila

== See also ==
- Pamantasan
