= Benjamin Tayabas =

Filipino educator and administrator

Benjamin G. Tayabas

5th President of the Pamantasan ng Lungsod ng Maynila
- Preceded by: Dr. Jose D. Villanueva (in 1989); Dr. Virsely M. dela Cruz (in 2000); Atty. Jose M. Roy III (in 2006)
- Succeeded by: Atty. Adel A. Tamano

Personal details
- Born: Hermosa, Bataan, Philippines
- Education: University of Arizona
- Profession: Professor

Benjamin G. Tayabas is a US-trained Filipino educator and administrator. He is the longest-serving university president of the Pamantasan ng Lungsod ng Maynila. He succeeded Dr. Jose D. Villanueva in 1989, Dr. Virsely M. dela Cruz in 2000, and Atty. Jose M. Roy III in 2006. His initial term as PLM president was broken when he briefly served as Undersecretary of the Department of Education.

Aside from manning the city university, he served as the President of the Association of Local Colleges and Universities, the 1st Vice-President of the Philippine Association of Technological Association (PATE), member of the board of trustees of the Institute for Studies on Diabetes Foundation and Laguna University, and an incorporator of the National Network of Quality Assurance Agencies (NNQAA). In 2005, he was chosen as one of the executive committee members of the Cinemanila International Film Festival.

Tayabas is the first Filipino and foreigner to have received the 2005 Korean Prize in Cultural Education and the 4th Korean Christian Cultural Academy of Arts Award (KCCAA) in Seoul, Korea for his fostering more than 10 years of partnership with the Korean Cultural Arts organization and the PLM in providing graduate education to Korean students and contributing to inter-cultural education and understanding. He was also named by the Jaycess Senate as one of Ten Outstanding Filipinos (TOFIL).

Although Tayabas helped continue the development of PLM onto the national stage, his administration had been linked to countless anomalies uncovered by the Commission on Audit. through elaborate corruption and massive embezzlement of public funds. Moreover, he had been notorious in suppressing student rights and academic freedom, including campus press freedom, and the shutting down of the official student paper Ang Pamantasan twice during his terms of office.
