= President of the Pamantasan ng Lungsod ng Maynila =

President of The University of the City of Manila
- Incumbent; Atty. Domingo Reyes Jr. since October 31, 2023
- Appointer: PLM Boards of Regents
- Inaugural holder: Benito F. Reyes
- Formation: 1967

The President of the Pamantasan ng Lungsod ng Maynila is the principal executive officer of the University of the City of Manila. The office was created by the Republic Act 4196, which is today's University Charter.

The President oversees the policy implementation, guide the institution towards the realization of its vision-mission, as well as monitor and administer the overall affairs of the PLM, including its three major functions - instruction, research and community extension services.

The members of the Board of Regents are tasked to elect from among themselves a university president who shall serve for a term of six years which is renewable for another term of six years.

== Liturgy of the investiture of the President ==
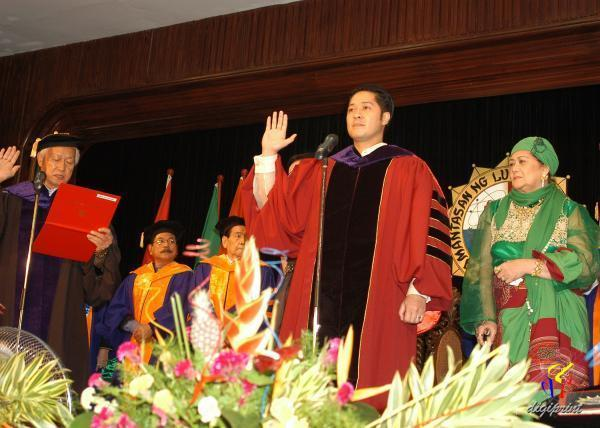
President Adel Tamano being administered the oath of office by Mayor Alfredo Lim on January 31, 2008.

After the election of the President, the Chairman of the Board of Regents is tasked to formally conduct a presidential investiture liturgy.

The investiture liturgy consists of formal features like the turnover of the mace of authority and power by the chairman, and the presentation of the academic collar composed of linked gold coins stamped with the logo of the university. It also showcases the rich tradition and culture of the Filipinos through dance, music and colorful costumes.

The mace symbolizes the authority of the president, and it is the symbolic source of power of his executive acts and his administration; the academic collar signifies his vow to embrace the traditions and values of the academic community, while the medallion (with the golden seal of the PLM impressed on it) represents his commitment in the pursuit of truth as well as the burden of academic leadership inherent in his position.

Upon presentation of the academic collar, the chairman is required to utter: "As you wear it, wear it with dignity and pride, like other presidents of the University before you."

The first investiture liturgy happened on February 10, 1968, when Mayor Antonio J. Villegas turned over the Mace of Authority and Power to Dr. Benito F. Reyes, the first President of the PLM.

== List of presidents of the Pamantasan ng Lungsod ng Maynila ==
Number	Name	Start	End
1.	Dr. Benito F. Reyes	February 23, 1967	June 23, 1972
2.	Dr. Consuelo S. Blanco	December 21, 1972	May 31, 1978
3.	Dr. Ramon Bagatsing	June 1, 1978	October 27, 1982
4.	Dr. Jose D. Villanueva	January 14, 1983	June 30, 1989
5.	Dr. Benjamin G. Tayabas	July 1, 1989	June 24, 1996
6.	Dr. Virsely M. dela Cruz	June 25, 1996	1999
Acting President	Dr. Ma. Corazon T. Veridiano	May 1999	December 1999
Officer-in-Charge	Atty. Emmanuel R. Sison	December 1999	February 2000
5.	Dr. Benjamin G. Tayabas	February 23, 2000	August 1, 2007
Acting President	Atty. Jose M. Roy III	February 23, 2006	June 1, 2006
7.	Atty. Adel A. Tamano	August 9, 2007	November 23, 2009
Acting President	Atty. Rafaelito M. Garayblas	November 2009	---
8.	Atty. Artemio G. Tuquero	July 1, 2013	September 2014
9.	Dr. Ma. Leonora V. de Jesus	September 2014	July 2019
10.	Emmanuel A. Leyco	July 1, 2019	September 29, 2023
11.	Atty. Domingo Reyes Jr.	October 31, 2023	– present
