= PLM Emeritus College =

Pamantasan ng Lungsod ng Maynila Emeritus College
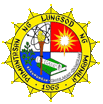
- Type: Public
- Established: 2002
- Dean: Prof. Esperanza Bautista
- Location: Intramuros, Manila, Philippines
- Website: www.plm.edu.ph

The PLM Emeritus College is one of the eight Graduate schools of the Pamantasan ng Lungsod ng Maynila. It is headed by Prof. Esperanza Bautista as Dean, and staffed by educators and professionals who are leaders in their respective fields
