= Ospital ng Maynila Medical Center =

Government hospital in Manila, Philippines

- Pamantasan ng Lungsod ng Maynila
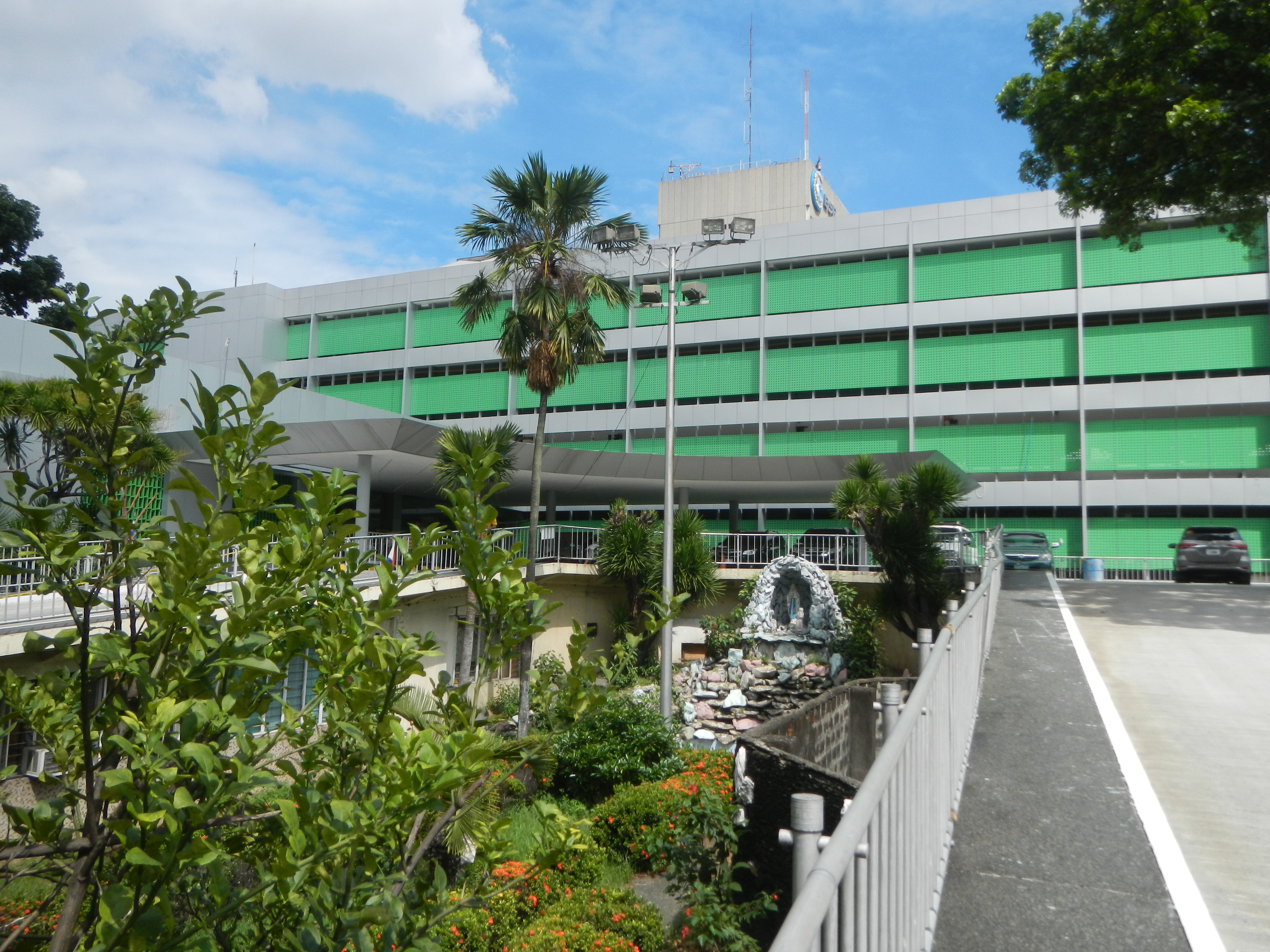

Geography
- Location: Malate, Manila, Metro Manila, Philippines
- Coordinates: 14°33′50″N 120°59′11″E

Organization
- Care system: Public, Philippine Health Insurance Corporation (PhilHealth) accredited
- Type: Teaching
- Affiliated university: Pamantasan ng Lungsod ng Maynila

Services
- Emergency department: Yes
- Beds: 300+

History
- Former name: Arsenio H. Lacson Memorial Hospital (1962–1968, inception)
- Opened: 1969

Links
- Lists: Hospitals in the Philippines

The Ospital ng Maynila Medical Center (Hospital of Manila; abbreviation: OMMC) is a 300-bed non-profit tertiary, general and training hospital in Malate, Manila, Philippines. It is the laboratory hospital of health science students (students of medicine, nursing and physical therapy) enrolled at the Pamantasan ng Lungsod ng Maynila, one of the Philippines' universities. It is also one of the six district hospitals of the City of Manila, catering its 5th district, which consists of Malate, Ermita, Intramuros, Port Area, San Andres, and the southern portion of Paco.

As hospital operated and maintained through the taxes by residents of Manila, OMMC has for its primary concern the admission and treatment of patients who are bona fide residents of the city. Furthermore, it is responsible for the provision of an integrated community health program and research activities.

== History ==
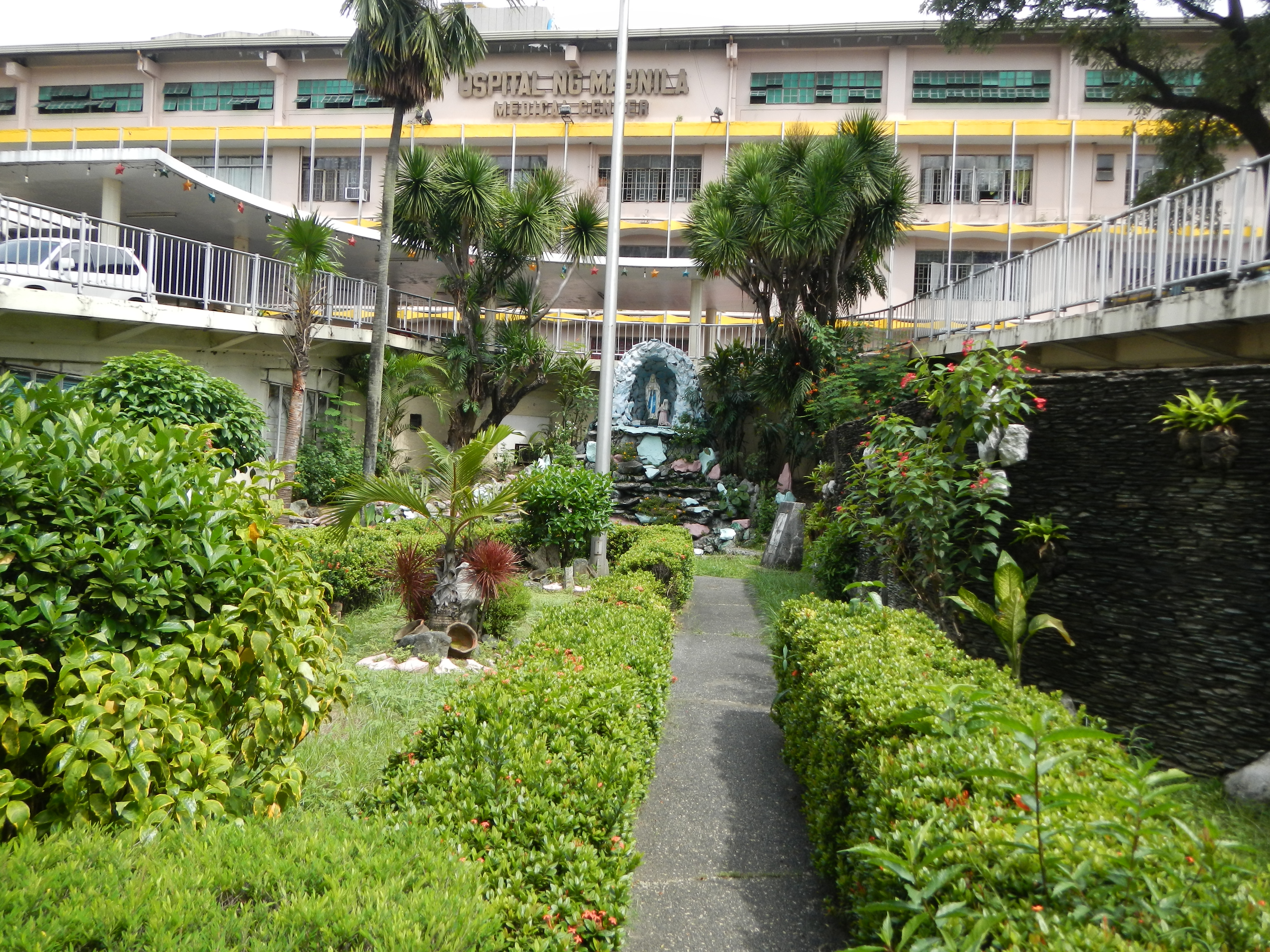
The Ospital ng Maynila Medical Center in 2015

Studies reveal that an alarming number of city residents die without medical attendance. During the year 1967, 16.45% of the total deaths in the city occurred without medical attendance, and 14.43% with incomplete medical attendance. Added to this problem was the fact all the four national hospitals located in the city cannot accommodate all needy patients and even refuse some 8,000 patients a month.

The enactment on June 22, 1957, or Republic Act 1939, otherwise known as the Hospital Financing Act, spurred the City of Manila to establish its own hospital. The law required Manila to contribute 1% of its annual income for the operation and maintenance of national hospitals in the city.

Events leading to the establishment of the city hospital followed rapidly:

- December 30, 1959 – Councilor Eriberto Remigio sponsors and the municipal board enacts Ordinance No. 4201 appropriating the amount of ₱1 million for the construction of the city hospital.
- January 11, 1960 – In his inaugural address before the municipal board, Mayor Arsenio Lacson endorsed the hospital project which he said would cost ₱6 million.
- October 11, 1960 – Mayor Lacson issues Executive Order No. 39 creating a city general hospital advisory committee.
- May 23, 1961 – The municipal board, presided over by then Vice Mayor Antonio Villegas, passes Ordinance No. 4363 appropriating in additional amount of ₱1.5 million as requested by Mayor Lacson.
- April 11, 1962 – President Diosdado Macapagal issues Presidential Proclamation No. 31 turning over to the City of Manila for hospital purposes the national government property at the corner of Harrison and Roxas Boulevard.
- April 15, 1962 – Immediately upon assumption to office, Mayor Antonio Villegas pushes through the construction of the city hospital in the consonance with his program of “Libreng Pilipino” which hold, among other tings, that the right to medical care is part of the larger and more basic right of the individual to life, liberty and the pursuit of happiness.
- September 11, 1962 – The cornerstone of the city hospital is laid under the auspices of Mayor Villegas.
- October 20, 1962 – At the instance of Mayor Villegas, the municipal board passes Ordinance No. 4636 naming the proposed city general hospital as the Arsenio H. Lacson Memorial Hospital.
- December 18, 1963 – Actual construction work on the hospital building begins.
- December 5, 1968 – Upon the insistent representations of Mayor Lacson's widow, the municipal board passes Ordinance No. 6807 renaming the hospital as the Ospital ng Maynila.

OMMC was established on January 31, 1969, by the government of the City of Manila. The primary motivation in establishing the Medical Center was to provide city residents, 80% of who are classified as indigents, a better standard of medical care. It was originally planned to provide a total in-patient capacity of 300 beds and 60–90 nursery cribs. In addition, an outpatient department was included to provide medical care to ambulatory patients.

In May 2005, OMMC renovated its Emergency Department, Infirmary Ward and Neonatal Intensive Care Unit (Nursery). Moreover, it also acquired 250 new hospital beds, two incubators, two respirators, and Computed Tomography (CT) Scan services that is free for all legitimate residents of Manila.

On December 23, 2008, the hospital integrated the anthroposophic framework beginning with the institutionalization of integrative and complementary alternative medicine through the help of Dr. Michaela Glocker, who is the leader of the Medical Section at the Goetheanum, the School of Spiritual Science in Dornach, Switzerland since 1988.

As of 2013, the hospital was in a dismal state, was lacking in x-ray machines, and its accreditation as a Level 3 hospital was uncertain. As a response, the hospital underwent massive renovation worth ₱300 million from 2014 to 2017 during the term of Mayor Joseph Estrada. The renovation involved a new building and lobby, new operating room complex, surgery, and Intensive Care Unit (ICU) wards; modernized medicine, ophthalmology, and pediatrics departments; and procured medical and laboratory equipment.

On June 24, 2020, a new 10-story New Ospital ng Maynila broke ground, replacing the 51-year-old OMMC building, as announced by Mayor Isko Moreno. The project is part of the platform of the local party Asenso Manileño which Moreno heads. On June 24, 2022, the Bagong Ospital ng Maynila was formally opened, led by Moreno. The aforementioned new public hospital has a 384-bed capacity with 52 ward rooms, a total of 25 beds in 12 intensive care units (ICU), 19 private rooms, and six operating rooms. It features four bed elevators, two regular elevators, and two escalators. It also includes three levels of parking space and a helipad at the roof deck. The old OMMC building will be transformed into a new Pamantasan ng Lungsod ng Maynila campus that will house the College of Medicine and Allied Health Services.

== Awards and recognition ==
The internationally acclaimed OMMC Department of Surgery

In 2004, the OMMC Department of Surgery won in the Human Resource and Development category for its Knowledge Management System. The award was presented in ceremonies at the Plaza Athenee Hotel in Bangkok, Thailand, to the hospital director Dr. Christia Padolina and surgery department head Dr. Reynaldo Joson. It bested 166 projects from 55 hospitals in 11 countries, and it is also the first public hospital to win in the Asian Hospital Management Awards. A year later, the OMMC Department of Surgery was awarded 1st Runner-up in the 2005 Asian Corporate Social Responsibility (CSR) Awards for the Best Workplace Practices Category for its Conducive Practice Program for Surgical Residents.

In 2007, the OMMC was the recipient of the prestigious Anvil Awards and received citations in recognition of its Class A medical services and facilities.

== Endowment ==
As the premiere city and training hospital, the OMMC has an annual budget of PhP 253.6 million. In 2008, an additional PhP 30 million was allotted for the hospital to further improve its facilities.

== Organizational structure ==
=== Departmental organization ===
The various departments, including both in-patient and out-patient services, are grouped under 3 major services:

==== Administrative Services ====
The Board of Trustees, the governing body of the hospital, formulates all the general policies regarding the operation of the hospital, and recommended, for the Mayor's consideration, the appointment of hospital staff and personnel, as well as assist in securing additional financial support for the hospital. The members, who are appointees of the mayor, serve on a voluntary basis and not entitled to any remuneration.

The Hospital Administrator, the actual authority for the administration of the hospital, is in direct charge of its management and responsible for the smooth functioning of hospital activities. The administrator is guided by policies determined by the Board and shall coordinate effectively medical, nursing, and administrative services, in order to attain the objectives or goals of the hospitals.

==== Medical services ====
===== Departments =====
Apart from the Outpatient Services, Medical Services Division is sub-divided into the different departments namely:

Family Medicine	Surgery
Pediatrics	Obstetrics & Gynecology
Anesthesia	Ophthalmology
Otorhinolaryngology	Dermatology
Pathology	Radiology
Emergency Department	Internal Med & Intensive Care

Along with the clinical departments the following services were included:

Dental Services	PLM-OMMC Medical Library
Psychiatry Service	Medical Social Service
Medical Records and Library	Hemodialysis
Children's Cancer Ward	Homeward Haven:HIV/AIDS Care Services

== Further information ==
- News articles and supplements
  - Salaverria, Leila. Ospital ng Maynila Patient Care Program bags Award. Inq7.Net. October 9, 2004.
  - Hospital Management Asia 2004 Winners
- Multimedia
