= Pamantasan ng Lungsod ng Maynila Open University =

Public open university in Manila, Philippines

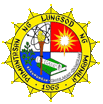
- Motto: Karunungan, Kaunlaran, Kadakilaan (Wisdom, Prosperity, Honor)
- Type: Public, Open University
- Established: 1997
- Chancellor: Adel A. Tamano, AB, JD, MPA, LlM (Harvard)
- Location: Manila, Philippines; 14°35′12″N 120°58′35″E
- Campus: Urban
- Hymn: Pamantasang Mahal (Beloved University)
- Colors
- Website: www.plm.edu.ph
- Location in Manila Location in Metro Manila Location in Luzon Location in the Philippines

The Open University of the Pamantasan ng Lungsod ng Maynila (PLM) or University of the City of Manila headquartered at the Gusaling Don Pepe Atienza at Intramuros, Manila, has operated a continuing education program for working adults and professionals in its partner institutions and agencies in and out of the country. It is designed to provide higher education and improved qualifications to individuals who are unable to take advantage of traditional modes of education because of personal and professional responsibilities. Open University offers undergraduate and postgraduate degree programs.

== History ==
The reorganization at the Pamantasan ng Lungsod ng Maynila (PLM) in 1997 paved the way for the establishment of the Division of Community Health Services (DCHS), which now serves as a component of the Open University. With the Integrated Midwifery Association of the Philippines (IMAP), it pioneered a program leading to the degree of Bachelor of Science in Community Health Service (BSCHS), a special program to qualified members and officers of IMAP that aims to upgrade their standards and quality of services. On April 16, 1998, PLM graduated its first batch of 87 midwives. Of these graduates, 39 were sponsored by Nestle Philippines.

Working with the Quality University Education for Social Transformation (QUEST), a non-government educational foundation, PLM and the Trinity University of Asia in Quezon City have already graduated more than 6,000 midwives nationwide.

Originally offering only the BCHS Program, the DCHS expanded its offerings to include the Master of Community Health Service (MCHS) in 2001. A year later, PLM by virtue of its charter, installed its General Education Curriculum (GEC) for the first two years of college education at the Second Philippine International School (SPIS), an all-Filipino educational institution for Overseas Filipino Workers in Riyadh, Kingdom of Saudi Arabia. This curriculum, permitted by the Kingdom of Saudi Arabia Ministry of Education, allows the student to pursue, in later years, courses in any discipline at PLM or in any institution for higher learning in the Philippines. Visiting assignments of PLM professors are part of the agreement between the partner schools.

In 2004, off-campus connections were established with Asia Pacific College of Advanced Studies, Southville International School and Colleges, and World CITI Colleges. In that same year, Mayor Feliciano Belmonte, Jr. of Quezon City signed a memorandum of agreement with the Open University that allows undergraduate city and barangay employees to get a college degree. To qualify, City Hall applicants should have served the local government for at least two years. Barangay employees, whether elected or appointed, must be at least high school graduates. Apart from city employees and officials, Quezon City residents are eligible to apply. Open to them are courses in business management and entrepreneurship.

At present, the distance learning programs and the off-campus program that offer a bachelor's degrees in public administration remains a continuing program. It is designed to help qualified government employees get their degrees and improve their competencies as a public servant.

== Admissions ==
Admission to the Open University is the responsibility of the partner school or agency. Students undergo either the screening procedure set by the partner agency or institution, or take the usual Graduate Record Examination (GRE) for on-campus admission at the PLM main campus.

Classes in the off-campus at the master's level programs are held on weekends in the host or partner institution. Provision for modular instructions are provided in various programs should the student decide to complete his tertiary education.

Part of the quality control that PLM imposes is the administration of a validation test in all subjects at the end of each semester. The results of this validation test shall form part of the grade a student receives in each subject.

== Consortia ==
Aside from partner schools, PLM is also engaged in partnership with companies, government agencies, organizations, and other institutions for the distance learning programs. These include:

- Association of Christian Educators of the Philippines
- ATS Technologies, Inc.
- Bicol Foundation for Higher Education
- Camps Caringal I & II
- Center for Reconstruction and Empowerment through Appropriate Technology and Education
- Central Police District in Quezon City
- Department of Budget and Management
- Department of the Interior and Local Government
- Department of Labor and Employment
- Fortune Guarantee and Insurance Corporation in Makati City
- Government Service Insurance System (GSIS)
- Laguna Lake Development Authority
- Light Rail Transit Authority (LRTA)
- Manila City Hall
- Manila Police District
- Manila Public Relations Bureau
- Mines and Geosciences Bureau
- National Museum
- National Press Club of the Philippines
- National Food Authority (NFA)
- Police Traffic Enforcement Group
- Philippine Ports Authority (PPA)
- Philtread Tire and Rubber Corporation
- Quezon City Hall
- St. Joseph's College (Quezon City)
- Four Chefs' Cuisine Inc.
- Uncle Cheffy System of Restaurants
- Perfect Fusion Inc.
- PsychServ Inc.
- Twin Fusion Inc.
- TCGI Engineers
- Vinta Systems Inc.
- Philippine Psychological Corporation
- National Center for Mental Health
