= Adel Tamano =

Filipino lawyer, educator, and corporate executive

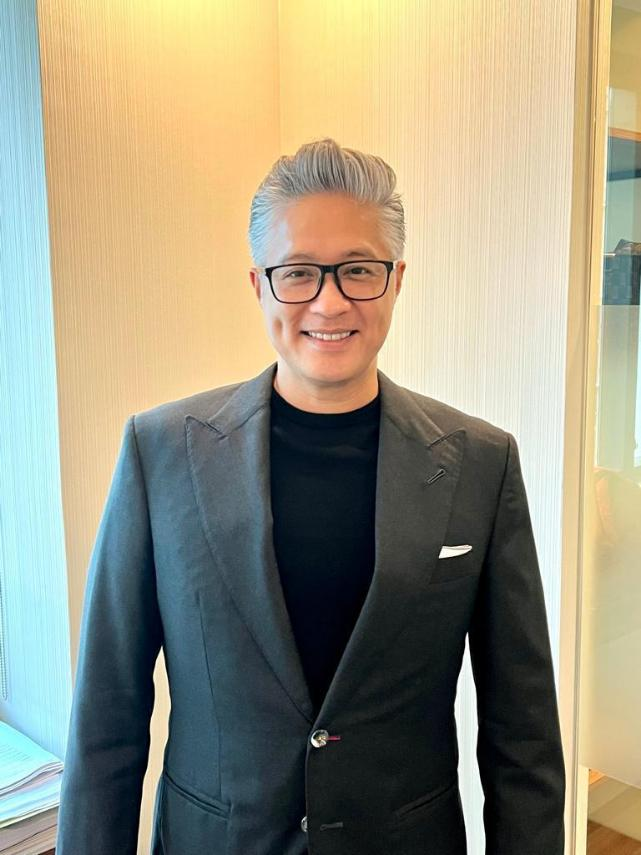
- Tamano in 2022

Chief administrative officer of Dito Telecommunity
- Incumbent
- Assumed office 2020–present

7th President of the Pamantasan Lungsod ng Maynila
- In office August 4, 2007 – November 30, 2009
- Preceded by: Dr. Benjamin G. Tayabas
- Succeeded by: Atty. Rafaelito M. Garayblas

Personal details
- Born: October 2, 1970 (age 56) Manila, Philippines
- Party: Nacionalista
- Other political affiliations: UNO (until 2010)
- Spouse: Rowena Kapunan
- Children: 2
- Parent: Mamintal Tamano (father)
- Education: Ateneo de Manila University (BA, JD); Harvard University (LL.M.); University of the Philippines Diliman (MPA)

Adel Abbas Tamano (born October 2, 1970) is a Filipino lawyer and educator. He is the current chief administrative officer, chief of Human Resources, and corporate secretary of DITO Telecommunity Corporation. He gained prominence as the spokesperson for the anti-Arroyo party United Opposition (UNO) in 2007 and was part of the senate lineup in 2010.

== Early life and education ==
Tamano was born on October 2, 1970, in Manila to Senator Mamintal Tamano and civic leader Hadja Putri Zorayda Abbas Tamano. He was their eighth child.

Tamano started his academic career at The Ateneo de Manila University with a degree in Economics. From there, he obtained multiple degrees: a Juris Doctor from the Ateneo de Manila University, a Master’s in Public Administration from the University of the Philippines (2003), and a Master of Laws from Harvard Law School (2005).

== Professional career ==
Working under the esteemed Estelito P. Mendoza, Tamano received a practical education in the law and went on to work as an associate with several law firms. He opened his firm in 2004.

Tamano has worked as a teacher and administrator of a few schools and universities. He served as dean for the College of Law of Liceo de Cagayan University in Cagayan de Oro from 2011 to 2012. Before that, he was the university president of the Pamantasan ng Lungsod ng Maynila from 2007 to 2009.

Also in 2011, Tamano joined the corporate world when he was brought on as vice president for Public Affairs and Communications for Coca-Cola Philippines.

In 2019, he took the helm as chief administrative officer, chief of Human Resources, and corporate secretary of DITO Telecommunity Corporation. Under his watch, the company has been growing in the difficult Philippine market.

== Career highlights ==
Tamano led the DITO organization in the bidding, establishment, and commercial launch of the third telco in the Philippines.

He has held top-level government posts as university president (University of the City of Manila (2007–2009) and general counsel of the Senate of the Philippines' Committee on Justice (2007–2008).

== Media ==
In tandem with his law career, corporate positions, and work in academia, Tamano has also maintained a media presence and platform. He wrote a column in The Philippine Star, and had a show on ANC which was called Tamano Perspective.

== Personal life ==
Tamano is married to attorney Rowena Kapunan. The couple has two sons.
