= Florida M. Bautista =

Filipino film director

Florida M. Bautista is an independent film director in the Philippines. She is a Mass Communication graduate of the Pamantasan ng Lungsod ng Maynila. Her masterpiece, Saan Nagtatago si Happiness?, a light comedy semi-musical film with original songs and entertaining dance numbers, is one of the eight finalists in the 2006 Cinemalaya Philippine Independent Film Festival.

She directed the music video "Pretend I Don’t Love You" which won Metropop's First Music Video Making Contest. She took an Acting Workshop for Film and TV at ABS-CBN and a Playwriting Workshop at the Cultural Center of the Philippines. She worked for ABS-CBN TV Production and is now a freelance Production Manager.
