= Hiyas ng Maynilad Dance Troupe =

The Hiyas ng Maynilad Dance Troupe is the official and premiere cultural dance company of the Pamantasan ng Lungsod ng Maynila. The company, consisting of student-performers under the umbrella PLM President's Committee on Arts and Culture, made its debut performance during the University's anniversary celebration in 1982. Since then, it has presented dances in costumes that reflect the traditional culture of the Philippines. Together with the PLM Rondalla, the company has also appeared as the Hiyas ng Maynilad and Cultural Group.

The company has several notable performances before local, national and international audiences, among them for delegates to the Film Festival in 1983, Puerta Real Evenings, concerts at the Philtrade Center, Philippine International Convention Center, LawAsia conference, 1994 Miss Universe Beauty Pageant, television appearances, World Meeting of Families at Rizal Park, Paco Park concerts, Concert at the Park, Wow Philippines in Intramuros, Sunday Evenings at the QC Circle, Araw ng Maynila Outstanding Manilans Awards Night, the Ship for Southeast Asia Youth Program sponsored by the Japanese government, 4th Philippine International Performance Art Festival, and notable performances in nearby provinces and cities for fund-raising projects.

The company also won the championship trophy in the cultural competition sponsored by the Association of Local Colleges and Universities. In 1990, the dance company and the PLM Rondalla represented Manila in the cultural dance festival held in Tokyo, Japan, and in 1996 again represented Manila in the Asian Week '96 held in Pusan, Korea.

Dazzling with colorful costumes and props, the company back to life some of the Philippines' famous indigenous and ritualistic dances, including banderitas, Dance of the Tambourines, maglalatik, the Tausog dance Paulanjulni, and the royal dance, singkil.

At present, the company's artistic direction is being undertaken by Rodel "Aiko" Valdez with Archie Dema-ala as Resident Choreographer. In addition, it also had the opportunity to be choreographed by Benson Saclag, the son of Alonzo Saclag, the country's National Living Treasure from Lubuagan, Kalinga. The Dance Company is proud of its Kalinga Dance suite, the product of collaborative work between the Budong Dance Company of Kalinga headed by Alonzo Saclag and Resident Choreographer Archie Dema-ala of the Hiyas ng Maynilad Dance Company.
