= Intramuros Consortium =

Academic cooperation in Manila, Philippines

- Formation: 2002; 24 years ago
- Purpose: Academic cooperation
- Location: Intramuros, Manila
- Members: 4 institutions (2017)

The Intramuros Consortium, established in 2002, is a non-profit, academic cooperation consisting of four prominent institutions of higher education located in Intramuros, Manila, Philippines. The colleges' libraries participate in an interlibrary loan program, allowing students, staff, and faculty to take advantage of all four campuses' collections. In addition, several academic projects and research programs are run by the Consortium jointly for the benefit of all four institutions.

== Members ==
Institution	Type	Founded
Colegio de San Juan de Letran	Private, Catholic (Dominican)	1620
Lyceum of the Philippines University	Private, Non-sectarian	1952
Mapúa University	Private, Non-sectarian	1925
Pamantasan ng Lungsod ng Maynila	Public, Local university	1967
