= PLM Chapel =

Roman Catholic university chapel in Manila, Philippines

- Shrine of Jesus the Divine Teacher
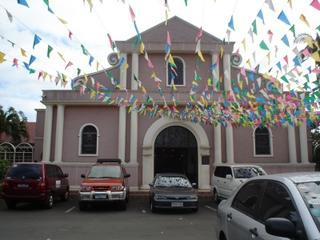
- Chapel facade (c. pre-2007)
- PLM Chapel
- 14°35′10″N 120°58′35″E
- Location: Pamantasan ng Lungsod ng Maynila, Manila
- Country: Philippines
- Denomination: Roman Catholic

History
- Status: Chapel; Shrine
- Founded: December 17, 1990

Architecture
- Functional status: Active
- Heritage designation: Marked Historical Landmark
- Architectural type: Church

Administration
- Archdiocese: Archdiocese of Manila
- Parish: San Agustin Parish

The Shrine of Jesus, the Divine Teacher, commonly known as PLM Chapel, is a Roman Catholic church largely used by students and employees of PLM (Pamantasan ng Lungsod ng Maynila). It is under the jurisdiction of the Archdiocese of Manila. One side of the church houses a chapel dedicated to the Virgin Mary as the Immaculate Conception, patroness of the City of Manila and of the Philippines, while another side chapel is dedicated to Saint Joseph.

Apart from San Agustin Church and Manila Cathedral, it is one of the nine churches within the walled city of Intramuros in downtown Manila which is popular for people doing the Visita Iglesia during Holy Week.

== History ==
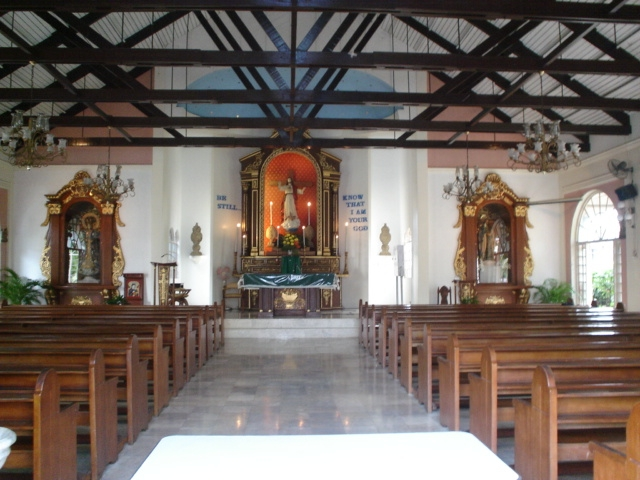
Church interior in 2007

PLM Chapel was established in 1990 through the efforts of then Bishop Teodoro Bacani Jr. It was blessed and inaugurated by Cardinal Jaime L. Sin, Archbishop of Manila, on December 17, 1990.

On June 29, 2019, Ambassador Koji Haneda of Japan attended the blessing and installation of the statue of Takayama Ukon, and the unveiling of his historical marker at the PLM Chapel. The ceremony was hosted by Cardinal Luis Antonio Tagle, Archbishop of Manila. Apostolic Nuncio Gabriele Giordano Caccia also attended the ceremony. The statue was installed at the PLM Chapel, followed by the unveiling of the markers which follow Takayama Ukon's journey in Manila.
