= Benito F. Reyes =

Filipino academic (1914–1992)

1st President of the Pamantasan ng Lungsod ng Maynila
- In office February 23, 1967 – June 23, 1972
- Succeeded by: Consuelo L. Blanco

Personal details
- Born: March 21, 1914 Bataan, Philippines
- Died: September 8, 1992 (aged 78) Santa Paula, California, U.S.
- Education: Far Eastern University (M.A)
- Profession: Professor

Benito Fernandez Reyes (March 21, 1914– September 8, 1992) is a Filipino academic and administrator. He was appointed as the first university president of the Pamantasan ng Lungsod ng Maynila in 1967. When he moved to the United States in the 1970s, Reyes founded the World University at Ojai, California.

== Early life and career ==
Benito Reyes was born into abject poverty in Manila, Philippines, on March 21, 1914. His father, a band leader, abandoned the family when Benito was very young. His mother, Antera Fernadez was a Po'O folk art healer (commonly known as a "death coach") who helped individuals transition through the death process. Antera died when Benito was in his early 20s.

As a teenager, Benito Reyes, was selected by the Theosophical Society as an important world leader similar to how they "discovered" and groomed Jiddu Krishnamurti. Shortly after, Reyes was spiritually adopted by a childless Theosophist couple from Ojai, California, who financed his higher education studies in philosophy and psychology.

Continuing on what he learned from his mother, Benito dedicated his career to the understanding of cross-cultural studies of spiritual beliefs and practices related to conscious dying.

Before his inauguration as the PLM President, Reyes was a professor at Far Eastern University for 21 years. In 1951–1952, he taught at Boston University as a Fulbright-Smith-Mundt professor, and in 1965, he was a Fulbright-Hays philosophy professor at the State University of New York. His scholar in residence Fulbright appointment was granted after he published his break-through book, Scientific Evidence of the Existence of the Soul, a finalist in a literary contest funded by James Kidd, a wealthy prospector who was willing to bequeath his entire estate to anyone who could prove there was a visual spirit; a spirit which we could see.

Reyes also lectured at Harvard, Brown, and other universities in America and around the world.

He published a number of works on philosophy, psychology, and the quest for meaning and purpose of life in his poetry of 1000 Sonnets for God. He was a member of the International Association of University Presidents (IAUP) that co-sponsored the World Peace University of Costa Rica. He was also with the Institute de la Vie of France, International Institute of Environment in England and in the Institute of Religious Psychology of Japan.

As a teenager, Benito married his childhood sweetheart Dominga Lopez, who was of Spanish descent. Together, they had seven children: Siddharta, Nourhalma, Thor-Alcyone, Alcor-Mizar, Amita, Adita, and Noemi.

He died in his residence in Santa Paula, California, on September 8, 1992. He was 78.
