= Academic grading in the Philippines =

In the Philippines, some universities follow a 4-point scale, which resembles or is equivalent to the U.S. grading system. This system uses a grade between 0.00 and 4.00 wherein 4.00 is the highest and 0.00 being a failing mark.

Other universities follow a 5-point scale, wherein the highest grade is a 1.00 and the lowest is a 5.00 (failing mark). The lowest passing mark is actually a 3.00. Although usually not depicted, a grade of 4.00 is equivalent to a grade of incomplete. If the school does not use the grade point "4.00", it will use "INC" instead.

Most colleges and universities will use either the 4-point or 5-point scales when presenting final grades. When scoring individual coursework, they will use the percent grade, letter grade, or both. More importantly, Philippine universities do not have standard grade equivalence. Different universities have varied equivalence range, while passing grades are subject to imposed academic quality of an institution.

K–12 (kindergarten and basic education) always uses the percent grade, letter grade, or both.

GWA (general weighted average; similar to GPA) is a representation (often numerical) of the overall scholastic standing of students used for evaluation. GWA is based on the grades in all subjects taken at a particular level including subjects taken outside of the curriculum. Representation of the subjects taken only in a specific curriculum is called CWA, or curriculum weighted average.

== Grade point scale (1.00–5.00) ==
University of the Philippines Grading Point System
Grade Point Equivalence	Grade Letter Equivalence	Equivalence	GPA Equivalence	Description
1.0	A+	99–100%	4.000	Excellent
1.25	A	96–98%	3.625–3.999	Very Good
1.5	A−	93–95%	3.250–3.624	Very Good
1.75	B+	90–92%	2.875–3.249	Good
2.0	B	87–89%	2.500–2.874	Good
2.25	B−	84–86%	2.125–2.499	Satisfactory
2.5	C+	81–83%	1.750–2.124	Satisfactory
2.75	C	78–80%	1.375–1.749	Pass
3.0	C−	75.00–77.74%	1.000–1.374	Pass
4.0	D	–	–	Conditional
5.0	F	Below 60%	0.000	Fail
INC	–	–	–	Incomplete

Polytechnic University of the Philippines Grade Point System
Grade Point Equivalence	Equivalence	Description
1.00	97–100%	Excellent
1.25	94–96%	Excellent
1.50	91–93%	Very Good
1.75	88–90%	Very Good
2.00	85–87%	Good
2.25	82–84%	Good
2.50	79–81%	Fair
2.75	76–78%	Fair
3.00	75%	Passing
5.00	Below 75%	Failure
INC		Incomplete
W		Withdrawal
D		Dropped

Central Colleges of the Philippines Grade Point System
Grade Point Equivalence	Equivalence	Description
1.00	96–100%	Excellent
1.25	94–95%	Very Good
1.50	91–93%	Very Good
1.75	88–90%	Good
2.00	85–87%	Good
2.25	83–84%	Good
2.50	80–82%	Fair
2.75	78–79%	Fair
3.00	75–77%	Pass
5.00	Below 75%	Failure
INC		Incomplete
NA		No Attendance
UW		Unauthorized Withdrawal
DRP		Dropped
NC		No Credit

STI College Grade Point System

Grade Point Equivalence	Equivalence	Description
1.00	97.50–100%	Excellent
1.25	94.50–97.49%	Very Good
1.50	91.50–94.49%	Very Good
1.75	88.50–91.49%	Very Good
2.00	85.50–88.49%	Satisfactory
2.25	81.50–85.49%	Satisfactory
2.50	77.50–81.49%	Satisfactory
2.75	73.50–77.49%	Fair
3.00	69.50–73.49%	Fair
5.00	Below 69.49	Failed
Dropped (DRP) – Official Dropped
Incomplete (INC) – Incomplete Requirements

Other universities, such as the Ateneo de Manila University and its sister schools, use the letter grade system with varied grade equivalence range.

University of Santo Tomas Grade Point System
Grade Point Equivalence	Equivalence	Description
1.00	96–100%	Excellent
1.25	94–95%	Very Good
1.50	92–93%	Very Good
1.75	89–91%	Good
2.00	87–88%	Good
2.25	84–86%	Good
2.50	82–83%	Fair
2.75	79–81%	Fair
3.00	75–78%	Pass
5.00	Below 75%	Failure
INC		Incomplete
FA		Failure due to Absences
WP		Withdrew with Permission
WF		Withdrew without Permission (Failure)

San Beda University Grade Point System (Effective since AY 2014–2015)
Grade Point Equivalence	Equivalence	Description
1.00	98–100%	Excellent
1.25	95–98%	Very Good
1.50	92–95%	Very Good
1.75	89–92%	Good
2.00	86–89%	Good
2.25	83–86%	Good
2.50	80–83%	Fair
2.75	78–80%	Fair
3.00	75–78%	Pass
5.00	Below 75%	Failure
INC		Incomplete (No Final Examination)
EXM		Exempted from NSTP
DV		Withdrew with Permission
DF		Withdrew without Permission (Failure)

The grading system of San Beda University is zero-based in nature which implies no transmutations are to be made.

Tarlac State University College of Engineering and Technology Grade Point System
Grade Point Equivalence	Equivalence	Description
1.00	99–100%	Excellent
1.25	95–98%	Very Good
1.50	90–94%	Very Good
1.75	85–89%	Good
2.00	80–84%	Good
2.25	75–79%	Satisfactory
2.50	70–74%	Satisfactory
2.75	65–69%	Passing
3.00	60–64%	Passing
5.00	<60%	Failing
INC	Incomplete	

The description mentioned in the table was based on Tarlac State University (TSU) Student Handbook. In addition, the grade of "INC" is given if a student whose class standing for the semester is passing, fails to take the final examination or fails to complete other course requirements for valid reason (Chap. 8, Sec. 1, TSU Student Handbook).

Mapúa University Grade Point System (Effective since AY 2021)
Grade Symbols	Description (Master's and Diploma Programs	Description (Doctoral Programs)	US Equivalence (IERF)
1.00	Excellent	Excellent	A+ = 4.00
1.25	Highly Meritorious	Very Satisfactory	A = 4.00
1.50	Very Satisfactory	Satisfactory	A− = 3.75
1.75	Satisfactory	Lowest Satisfactory Grade	B+ = 3.30
2.00	Lowest Satisfactory Grade	Poor Performance	B = 3.00
2.25	Poor Performance	Poor Performance	B− = 2.75
2.50	Poor Performance	Poor Performance	C+ = 2.30
2.75	Poor Performance	Poor Performance	C = 2.00
3.00	Poor Performance	Poor Performance	C = 2.00
5.00	Failure	Failure	F = 0.00
C	Continuing	Continuing	
I	Incomplete	Incomplete	
W	Official Withdrawal	Official Withdrawal	
IP	In Progress	In Progress	
P	Passed	Passed	
F	Failed	Failed	
Au	Audit	Audit	

University of the East Grade Point System (Effective since AY 2021)
Grade Point Equivalence	Percent	Letter	Description
1.00	98% – 100%	A+	Excellent
1.25	95% – 97%	A	Excellent
1.50	92% – 94%	A−	Very Good
1.75	89% – 91%	B+	Very Good
2.00	86% – 88%	B	Good
2.25	83% – 85%	B−	Good
2.50	80% – 82%	C+	Fair
2.75	77% – 79%	C	Passed
3.00	75% – 76%	C−	Passed
4.00	70% – 74%	D	Conditional (4.00 is not given as a Final grade but only as a Prelim or Midterm grade)
5.00	Below 70%	F	Failed
LFR – Lacks Final Requirement
W – Officially Dropped/Withdrawn
D – Unofficially Dropped
IP – In Progress
LOA – Leave of Absence
GRWH – Grade Withheld

University of San Carlos Grade Point System
Grade	Equivalence (Percentage)	Equivalence (Letter)	Description
1.0	100–95%	A+	Excellent
1.1	94%	A	Excellent
1.2	93%	A	Excellent
1.3	92%	A	Very Good
1.4	91%	A−	Very Good
1.5	90%	A−	Very Good
1.6	89%	A−	Very Good
1.7	88%	B+	Very Good
1.8	87%	B+	Very Good
1.9	86%	B+	Very Good
2.0	85%	B	Good
2.1	84%	B	Good
2.2	83%	B	Good
2.3	82%	B−	Good
2.4	81%	B−	Good
2.5	80%	B−	Good
2.6	79%	C+	Good
2.7	78%	C+	Good
2.8	77%	C+	Fair
2.9	76%	C	Fair
3.0	75%	C	Fair
5.0	Below 75%	C−	Failure
INC	Incomplete		
NC	No Credit		
W	Withdrawal		
IP	In Progress (applies only to thesis projects)		

== Grade point scale (4.00–1.00) ==
Far Eastern University Grade Point System (Effective since A.Y. 2013)
Written Grade	Grade Point Equivalence	Equivalence	Description
A	4.00	92–100%	Excellent
B+	3.50	85–91%	Very Good
B	3.00	78–84%	Very Good
C+	2.50	71–77%	Good
C	2.00	64–70%	Satisfactory
D+	1.50	57–63%	Satisfactory
D	1.00	50–56%	Passed
F	0.00	Below 49%	Failed
AW		0%	Authorized Withdrawal

Far Eastern University Institute of Technology Grade Point System (Effective since A.Y. 2018)
Raw Score	Grade Point Equivalence	Letter Rating	Percentage Equivalence	Comparative Grade Point	Description
95.8–100%	4.00	A	97–100	1.0	Excellent
91.5–95.7%	3.50	A−	93–96	1.25	Very Good
87.2–91.4%	3.00	B+	89–92	1.5	Very Good
82.9–87.1%	2.50	B	85–88	1.75	Good
78.6–82.8%	2.00	B−	81–84	2.0	Satisfactory
74.3–78.5	1.50	C	78–80	2.50	Satisfactory
70.0–74.2	1.00	D	75–77	3.0	Passed
Below 70.0	0.50	E	Below 75	5	Failed
Other Ratings
0.0			No Attendance/Excessive Absences		
6.0			Passed (For Internship/NSTP/Correlation Courses)		
7.0			Officially Dropped		
8.0			Credited (for Transferees)		
9.0			Incomplete		

National University-Manila Grade Point System
Grade Point Equivalence	Equivalence	Description
4.00	96–100%	Excellent
3.50	90–95%	Very Good
3.00	84–89%	Good
2.50	78–83%	Above Satisfactory
2.00	72–77%	Satisfactory
1.50	66–71%	Fair
1.00	60–65%	Passed
0.00	Failure	Failed
R	< 60%	Repeat/Failed
DR	Officially Dropped	Officially Dropped
INC	Incomplete	Incomplete

Silliman University Grade Point System (Effective since June 1992)
Numerical Grade Point	Equivalent Percentage	Description
3.8–4.0	97–100%	Excellent
3.3–3.7	93–96%	Superior
2.8–3.2	89–92%	Good
2.3–2.7	85–88%	Above Average
1.8–2.2	81–84%	Average
1.3–1.7	77–80%	Below Average
1.0–1.2	73–76%	Passing
0.0	72 and below	Failure

Adventist University of the Philippines, De La Salle-College of Saint Benilde, De La Salle Medical and Health Sciences Institute
Grade Point Equivalence	Equivalence	Description
4.00	97–100%	Excellent
3.50	93–96%	Superior
3.00	89–92%	Very Good
2.50	85–88%	Good
2.00	80–84%	Satisfactory
1.50	75–79%	Fair
1.00	70–74%	Pass
0.00	Below 70%	Fail

De La Salle University Grade Point System
Grade Point Equivalence	Description	Equivalence (60% passing)	Equivalence (70% passing)	Notes
4.00	Excellent	95–100%	97–100%	
3.50	Superior	89–94%	93–96%	Minimum cumulative and term GPA (3.4 and above) for University Honors List at the same trimester
3.00	Very Good	83–88%	89–92%	Minimum term GPA to be eligible for Dean's Honors List
2.50	Good	78–82%	85–88%	
2.00	Satisfactory	72–77%	80–84%	Minimum course grade to be eligible for University and Dean's Honors List
1.50	Fair	66–71%	75–79%	
1.00	Passed	60–65%	70–74%	
0.00	Failed	Below 60%	Below 70%	
9.90	Deferred			For thesis/practicum courses only.
INC	Incomplete			For students who fail to complete their enrolled course.
P	Pass			For pass/fail courses only.
F	Fail			For pass/fail courses only.
D	Deferred			
W	Withdrawn			

While most courses at De La Salle University-Manila maintain the above table for a passing grade of 60%, there are some courses where the passing grade can also be 50%, 55%, 65%, or 70%, in which the grade point equivalences would vary.

De La Salle University-Dasmariñas Grade Point System

Grade Point Equivalence	Equivalence	Notes
4.00	98–100%	
3.75	95–97%	
3.50	92–94%	Minimum semester GPA to be eligible for Dean's Honor List 1st Honors
3.25	89–91%	
3.00	86–88%	Minimum semester GPA to be eligible for Dean's Honor List 2nd Honors
2.75	83–85%	
2.50	80–82%	
2.25	77–79%	
2.00	74–76%	
1.75	71–73%	
1.50	68–70%	
1.25	64–67%	
1.00	60–63%	
0.00	Below 60%	Fail due to: Inability to satisfy the minimum requirements of the subject/s; Excessive absences

== Letter grade system ==
Ateneo de Davao University Letter Grade System
Quality Point Equivalence	Letter Grade Equivalence	% Equivalence
4.0	A	92–100%
3.5	B+	88–91%
3.0	B	84–85%
2.5	C+	80–83%
2.0	C	76–79%
1.0	D	72–75%
0.0	F	71% and lower

Ateneo de Manila University Letter Grade System
Grade Point Equivalence	Letter Grade Equivalence	% Equivalence
4.0	A	92–100%
3.5	B+	87–91%
3.0	B	83–86%
2.5	C+	79–82%
2.0	C	75–78%
1.0	D	70–74%
0.0	F	below 70%

Most academic departments in the university follow a grading system with the 70% passing grade. Some departments, such as the Department of Finance and Accounting and departments from the Ateneo School of Science and Engineering follow a 50% or 60% passing grade.

International School Manila Letter Grade System
Grade Point Equivalence	Letter Grade Equivalence	% Equivalence
4.0	A	94–100%
3.7	A−	90–93%
3.3	B+	87–89%
3.0	B	83–86%
2.7	B−	80–82%
2.3	C+	77–79%
2.0	C	73–76%
1.7	C−	70–72%
1.3	D+	67–69%
1.0	D	63–66%
0.7	D−	60–62%
0.0	F	below 60%

=== Latin Honors grade equivalences ===
Some Philippine universities and colleges give Latin honors in conveying the level of distinction that an academic degree has been earned.

De La Salle University-Manila, De La Salle University-Dasmariñas, De La Salle Medical and Health Sciences Institute and De La Salle-College of Saint Benilde Latin Honors
Latin Honors	Grade Point Equivalence Range
Summa Cum Laude	3.800–4.000
Magna Cum Laude	3.600–3.799
Cum Laude	3.400–3.599
Honorable Mention	3.200–3.399

University of Santo Tomas, and Pamantasan ng Lungsod ng Maynila Latin Honors.
Latin Honors	Grade Point Equivalence Range
Summa Cum Laude	1.20–1.00
Magna Cum Laude	1.45–1.21
Cum Laude	1.75–1.46

University of Santo Tomas Faculty of Civil Law and Faculty of Medicine and Surgery Latin Honors
Latin Honors	Grade Point Equivalence Range	Equivalence
Summa Cum Laude	1.00–1.50	92% and above
Magna Cum Laude	1.51–1.85	88.5% to 91.9%
Cum Laude	1.86–2.10	86% to 88.4%

Prerequisite for UST's Latin Honors or Dean's Lister distinction are the following: QPI should be at least 86%, no grade below 80% for any subject in the given semester, and the student should obtain a good moral character.

Ateneo de Manila University Latin Honors
Latin Honors	Grade Point Equivalence Range
Summa Cum Laude	3.87–4.00
Magna Cum Laude	3.70–3.86
Cum Laude	3.50–3.69
Honorable Mention	3.35–3.49
