= Pamantasan ng Lungsod ng Maynila District Colleges =

Coordinates: 14°35′12″N 120°58′35″E

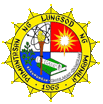
- Motto: Karunungan, Kaunlaran, Kadakilaan
- Motto in English: Wisdom, Prosperity, Honor
- Type: Public higher education institution
- Established: 2001; 25 years ago
- Chairman: Dr. Francisco L. Roman, Jr.
- President: Adel A. Tamano, AB, JD, MPA, LlM
- Location: Tondo and Quiapo, Manila, Metro Manila, Philippines
- Campus: Urban
- Hymn: Pamantasang Mahal (Beloved University)
- Colors
- Website: www.plm.edu.ph

The District Colleges of the Pamantasan ng Lungsod ng Maynila was established in 2001 through the Memorandum of Agreement (MOA) between the Manila Mayor, the Department of Education Secretary, the PLM President, and the Superintendent of the Division of City Schools-Manila.

The students and facilities of the District Colleges are housed in three existing public schools. These schools are Antonio Villegas Technical School in Tondo (District I), Ramon Avanceña High School in Quiapo (District III).

In about the same period, another MOA was signed with the Technical Education and Skills Development Authority, providing partnership with the City government through the PLM education system.

On May 31, 2002, the Department of Social Welfare and Development of Manila, conducted the Integrated Early Childhood Care and Development (IECCD). It was the first academic course conducted in the District Colleges through the auspices of the United Nations Children's Fund.
