= Ang Pamantasan =

Philippine student organization and newspaper

- Type: Student publication
- Format: Broadsheet, Tabloid, Newsletter, Magazine, Book (depending on publication)
- Owner(s): Ang Pamantasan 1979 - PLM's Official Student Publication, Inc.
- Founded: 1979
- Language: English, Filipino (covering the month of August)
- Headquarters: AP Office, Gusaling Villegas, Pamantasan ng Lungsod ng Maynila, Intramuros, Manila, Philippines
- Circulation: University-wide
- Website: http://www.angpamantasan.org

The Ang Pamantasan (abbreviation: AP) is an independent student organization and the official student publication of the Pamantasan ng Lungsod ng Maynila.

This student organization is currently registered in the Securities and Exchange Commission (SEC) as a non-stock, non-profit corporation in the name of "Ang Pamantasan 1979 - PLM's Official Student Publication Inc." It was previously registered in SEC as "Ang Pamantasan, Inc."

This independent student organization was established in 1979, twelve years after the university formally opened.

== Nameplate ==
The current Ang Pamantasan nameplate mainly consists of the organization's logo and the name of the publication. It can be noted that the letters "P" and "N" in the word "Pamantasan" are slightly larger than the other letters, a design typical in the previous AP nameplates. The text's main color is blue, with strokes of yellow. Also in the nameplate, below the "Ang Pamantasan" text, is the phrase "The Official Student Publication of the Pamantasan ng Lungsod ng Maynila".

== History ==
=== Early years ===
HASIK, the predecessor of AP, published articles that criticized the Ferdinand Marcos administration. In 1972, the year Martial Law was declared, HASIK and many other national and campus newspapers were closed. HASIK's then editor-in-chief, Liliosa Hilao, was brutally killed allegedly by military men.

During Martial Law, several rules aiming to control the publications were set. In October 1978, the University Committee on School Publications (UCSP) was created. Its job was to censor every issue of the student publication.

In 1979, the student publication's name was changed to its present name. But even under a new name, the publication suffered the same old problems.

During the first decade of AP, its staffers fought for complete independence through fiscal autonomy and continued to battle censorship from the UCSP. In 1988, AP intensified its call for fiscal autonomy. The AP staff believed that the publisher of AP is the students and the administration should have no control over it.

=== The 1990s ===
On May 10, 1991, fiscal autonomy was granted to AP by Board of Regents (BOR) Resolution No. 1462. This allowed the publication to directly collect fees from the students.

On August 6 of the following year, the AP staff, with George T. Amurao as editor-in-chief, registered the publication as Ang Pamantasan, Inc. in the Securities and Exchange Commission (SEC). AP became a non-stock, non-profit corporation and an independent entity inside PLM.

Before the second semester of 1992 began, a memorandum circular, dated October 22, was released, making the AP fee a non-prerequisite to enrollment. This became a major concern for the AP staff as it posed the possibility of having low collection turnouts. Several students, headed by AP Editor-in-Chief Ma. Cecilia Leaño and Supreme Student Council (SSC) President Mayonello Yanilla, protested by conducting a rally.

On July 30, 1993, the office of the President issued Administrative Order No. 14, stating the formation of an Ad Hoc Committee, which was tasked to conduct an examination for new staffers of AP. This was made without consultation with the current staffers of AP. Because of this, several AP staffers and supporters picketed at the PLM gate.

Meanwhile, as the results of the AP examinations conducted by the administration were released, Jose Gabriel Mabutas was chosen as the new chief editor. During that time, two APs existed – the AP Inc. and the AP that was recently formed and was led by Mabutas. The former tagged the latter as the "AP Bogus", which was able to publish only one issue. A few months later, PLM President Benjamin G. Tayabas suspended the collection of the publication fee because of internal problems.

The issue was dragged into the courts by Dean Sumilong of CBA, who held the "bogus" exams. In that exam, those who have already taken the exam duly mandated by the AP by laws, took the opportunity to thwart the malicious intent of the PLM administration—to get hold of the AP's won press freedom, and blind the PLM community of the growing malady that stinks from the seat of President Benjamin Tayabas.

Dean Sumilong, filed an unjust vexation case against 9 staffers of Ang Pamantasan, which the staffers got over with after year. Aside from the case, these staffers were suspended. For 29 school days of suspension, they spent their days outside the campus picketing.

On November 10, 1994, the AP Inc. was closed down. For a period of two years, AP was non-operational, and the publication office was padlocked. Those who passed the editorial board examination, conducted by the outgoing staff, headed by Orlando Ballesteros, associate editor, pushed with the struggle. Two issues were printed and distributed, under the editorial board headed by Rodrigo Rivera, one in each school year, from 1994–1996.

During the term of Paul Salazar as supreme student council president the issue of AP re-opening was advocated. It is in the year 1996-1997 that an examination for new AP staffers was initiated although there was no support from the university administration.

The student publication was only revived on the latter part of the year 1996 when Dr. Virseley dela Cruz handled the university presidency. Jennifer Arceo was the first editor-in-chief of the revived AP.

In 1997, Manila Mayor Alfredo Lim imposed the zero collection policy for the non-paying students of PLM. AP's fund was subsidized by the city government.

When Lito Atienza won the elections and became the mayor of Manila, Lim's zero collection policy was not sustained and AP was allowed to collect from the non-paying students again.

=== Year 2000-2005 ===
In 2000, the request for the increase in the publication fee was approved by the PLM Board of Regents. From P17 it became P30. During this time, AP then led by its Editor- in-Chief Isagani V. Abunda II established an 'open communication' with the university administration. According to Abunda, this is just a strategy designed to maximize whatever little opportunities the administration can offer to the publication and the students. Abunda called this move 'confidence-building strategy'. Despite this, AP remained critical on several issues, particularly anomalies involving the previous administration and the plan during that time to increase the tuition fee for paying students of PLM.

On February 12, 2002, the AP staff and some SSC officers showed opposition to the proposed zero collection policy of a student council presidential candidate Ryan Ponce. This mass action led to a three-day suspension of around 15 students, most members of Bukluran Student Alliance and Sanlakas Youth, who participated in the said rally.

Before the enrolment for the first semester of 2003, AP was informed that the collection of its fees was placed at the last step of enrollment. Dr. Ester D. Jimenez, the then head of the Office of the University Registrar, explained that it was done because the collection of the AP and the SSC fees is not the responsibility of the university administration.

Under Ma. Cecilia D. Villarosa, AP published articles criticizing the administration for its allegedly unfair policies, misuse of funds and harassment on students, among others. These critical write-ups prompted some university officials to file complaints against AP before the students’ affairs office.

The AP staffers again held a rally, wherein all participants wore black. The said protest action, supported by Sanlakas party-list and Fr. Robert Reyes, was called "Black Saturday".

A month later, AP released Issue, a magazine which contained investigative reports on several campus issues. Included in the magazine was the controversial article entitled "The Big Five", which published the personal accounts, assets and liabilities of the five top university officials.

Because of this article, Dr. Virginia N. Santos, vice president for academic affairs, and Jimenez, who was also the head of the office of admissions, filed new complaints against AP.

Days before graduation of the year 2004, the College of Mass Communication dean requested to delete the names of AP editors Villarosa and Celeste J. Boniquit from the list of the graduating students, saying that they failed to comply with the academic requirements for graduation. The council also revoked the degree of associate editor Rose Belen M. Manaog. The dismissal was ordered on June 11 and the other staff members were all suspended.

Villarosa and others appealed to other student publications and to the national media. News regarding the expulsion and suspension of the AP writers was published in some newspapers and was able to get some attention from the broadcast media.

The administration immediately answered and denied the validity of AP staffers’ complaints. It released its statement and was published in several newspapers. With that, the issue cooled down.

On June 11, 2004, the AP office was opened without the presence of any of the staff members. According to the administration, it was opened only for safety and security purposes. The doorknob was allegedly replaced and the keys were turned over to the university security group.

A few days later, AP published a special issue that answered all accusations by the administration against them. The issue, which was tabloid-sized, had a big, catchy banner on the front page. The banner reads "Martial Law", obviously implying that there is no more press freedom in PLM.

On July 24, a few weeks after the remaining AP writers were suspended, the Student Publications Committee (SPC) conducted a competitive examination for aspiring AP writers.

Those who passed the written exam and a panel interview constituted the new AP editorial board. Jimboie D. Cordova was named editor in chief but after several months, he resigned.

The student writers who composed the new AP editorial staff were tagged as "administration puppets" by a number of students. These students, who were used to the hard-hitting style of the former AP writers, doubted the integrity and writing style of the new staff members. And while previous AP writers only had problems regarding their relationship with the university administration, the new ones had to bare with the problems brought by distrust, both on the part of the administration and of the students. The staff had difficulty in dealing with university officials and employees apparently because of the latter's bad impressions on AP considering its recent clash with the administration. On the other hand, students perceive the new staffers as pro-administration because it was the SPC who administered the examination. Recently though, AP has been getting support from the younger student population (composed of freshmen and sophomore students).

Meanwhile, in January 2005, the Manila Regional Trial Court ordered that the degree in mass communication be given to expelled AP editors Villarosa, Boniquit and Manaog.

After several months, Jimboie Cordova resigned. Rommel Lontayao, who was then the managing editor of AP, took charge of the student publication.

AP continued to have problems with publishing its issues because of its funds being handled by the administration. An issue then, to be published, must be "endorsed" by the publication's head adviser Dr. Romeo Barrios, who was also the dean of CMC.

It was because of this problem that the editors and staff realized that the organization must be independent in terms of handling its funds. Like in the previous cases, AP's call for fiscal autonomy was not immediately heeded.

AP conducted another competitive examination on September 1, 2005, and Lontayao was again chosen as editor in chief of AP.

=== Recent years ===
In January 2006, the Commission on Audit in PLM, then headed by Julia Ella Moreno, issued an Audit Observation Memorandum (AOM) 2006-12-20 instructing the administration to release the AP trust fund to the organization. The administration, as a response to the AOM, gave AP a set of conditions before they released the publication's fund.

On February of the same year, Atty. Jose M. Roy III, who was a member of the University's Board of Regents and the dean of the PLM College of Law, became acting president of PLM. Under his four-month term, AP was granted fiscal autonomy and was allowed to directly collect from the students. The payment of the AP fee was placed on Step 6 of the new enrolment procedure, which means that the students will have to pay the AP fee first before they were able to get their class cards. In May 2006, the organization was registered to SEC as Ang Pamantasan 1979 – PLM's Official Student Publication, Inc.

Dr. Tayabas, who had a reputation of closing down the student publication in the past, was reappointed for the third time as PLM president in June 2006.

In an issue dated July 2006, AP published an article entitled, "Complaint filed vs PLM prexy, BOR". A few months later, some of the AP staffers taking Mass Communication, including the editor in chief, experienced being pressured by a professor of the college. They were warned not to involve AP in "matters that has nothing to do with the students", such as university politics.

At this point, gathering data from university offices became a problem again. Request letters sent to some offices were either "lost", ignored, or denied. From the month of August, up to September, AP conducted its search for correspondents and artists.

In January 2007, AP started hearing rumors that the administration plans to replace AP with a sunshine publication. For the next couple of months, the organization remained passive about the said hearsays since those were not yet proven.

Because the current editor in chief of AP was a graduating student, the organization decided to appoint officers in charge that will serve as the editorial board of AP, in the meantime. Diane Denise Daseco was designated acting editor in chief of AP.

The greatest concern of the organization at this time was that AP will not be a pre-requisite to the enrolment. On May 2, AP editors went to the Student Information System of the Office of the University Registrar to confirm the rumored collection scheme for the first semester. However, Assistant University Registrar Ms. Noemi Gocuyo, stated that they were not aware of the "new" collection scheme. In the original copy of the enrolment process, only the AP was to collect for the publication.

On May 15, Gocuyo informed associate editor Grace Nartates and news editor Randolph Perez that there was indeed a new collection scheme after an emergency meeting. There, the rumored establishment of college publications was confirmed. On the same day, Perez, Nartates and Daseco went to confront the newly appointed SSC President Albert Werner Peneyra to tackle the issue. After the discussion, and hearing the side of AP, Peneyra admitted that he was not able to study the plan for the establishment of the college publications well. He said that he believed it was not necessary to inform AP of any of the SSC's plans. He even admitted that he was not aware of any repercussion that the creation of the college publication entailed. The student council president also admitted that he did not know anything about the cited legalities of handling the funds for the college publications. When asked if the official student publication could expect any action from the council president; Peneyra answered, "Iko-consult ko pa ‘to kay Dean Galang at President (I will consult Dean Galang [dean of the students' affairs office] and to President [Tayabas])."

Any document pertinent to the said issue was withheld from AP until the first day of the actual enrolment, May 16. All in all, the SSC only presented three documents to AP: the first one, an excerpt of the 5th Executive Committee Meeting of the Board of Regents on January 24; the second one, a "copy of the original and the unapproved material submitted to the President of the University" (Resolution No. 2007-01 and Proposed Uniform Guidelines for the College Student Publication); and the last one, the "revised and approved Resolution No. 2007-01".

This project of SSC aimed to create a publication in each college inside PLM. Through revised Resolution 2007-01, the payment of the college publication and Ang Pamantasan fees was made "on a voluntary basis only".

PLUMA, the literary folio of Ang Pamantasan.

== Other activities ==
AP sponsors Ang Pamantasan Gintong Panitik, which is an annual literary contest. It began on October 26, 1998, during the incumbency of Rhia Diomampo as editor-in-chief of AP, with the theme, "Living, Thriving and Dying in Manila: Circa '90" or "Iba't ibang Mukha ng Maynila: Sirka '90." The contest aims to breathe a life of awareness among PLM students towards a variety of issues at the same time nourish them with a sense of responsibility to participate in the Philippine society through their imaginative writings. It has different categories in both English and Filipino such as, short story/maikling kuwento, poem/tula, and essay/sanaysay. The winners are chosen by the faculty of PLM and other universities, and distinguished writers, who are mostly Carlos Palanca Awardees.

== Editorial board and staff ==
Like in many other student publications, the organization's editorial board is the policy-making body of AP. The Board decides on critical issues regarding the publication and formulates its internal rules. The Board is composed of seven (7) members: the editor in chief, the associate editor, the managing editor, the news editor, the features editor, the literary editor, and the circulation manager.

On the other hand, the staff is composed of members of the publication who are either senior or junior staffers.

Auxiliary positions such as sports editor, Filipino editor, business manager, and editorial board secretary may be given to staff members upon the decision of the majority of the editorial board.

An aspiring writer can only join the organization if he/she passes the annual Ang Pamantasan Examination (APEX), which is composed of a written exam and a panel interview.

== Related links ==
- The Print Media: A Tradition of Freedom
- Young, Illustrious Filipinos Fell Then - And Still Fall Now
- Filipino Women Are Not Scared of Another Dictatorship
