= Pamantasan ng Lungsod ng Maynila =

Municipal public university in Manila, Philippines

- Motto: Karunungan, Kaunlaran, Kadakilaan
- Motto in English: Wisdom, Prosperity, Honor
- Type: Public, Local university
- Established: June 19, 1965; 61 years ago
- Academic affiliations: ASAIHL, IAU, ALCU
- President: Domingo Reyes Jr.
- Faculty: 2,000
- Students: 13,000
- Undergraduates: 12,000
- Postgraduates: 1,000
- Location: Intramuros, Manila, Metro Manila, Philippines; 14°35′13″N 120°58′34″E
- Campus: Urban 30,000 square metres (3.0 ha)
- Newspaper: Ang Pamantasan (The University)
Colors
Gold; White; Green	Blue; Red
- Website: www.plm.edu.ph
- Location in Manila Location in Metro Manila Location in Luzon Location in the Philippines

The Pamantasan ng Lungsod ng Maynila (PLM), also officially known as the University of the City of Manila, is a municipal public university in Intramuros, Manila, Philippines. It is funded by the city government of Manila. The university was established on June 19, 1965, and opened on July 17, 1967, to 556 scholars, all coming from the top ten percent of graduates of Manila's public high schools.

PLM is the first tertiary-level institution in the country to offer tuition-free education, the first university funded solely by a city government, and the first institution of higher learning in the country to have its official name in Filipino.

From its first enrollment record of 556 freshman scholars coming from the top ten percent of the graduating classes of Manila's twenty-nine public high schools, total semestral enrollment has grown to an average of 10,000. The college has expanded from a single college to twelve colleges, seven graduate schools, two professional schools, and a score of research and specialized centers, including a teaching hospital, an entrepreneurial center, and an integrated learning center for toddlers. It maintains a comprehensive distance education and open university program for thousands of community health workers and public administrators in different regions nationwide, with affiliations and recognition from various national and international organizations and institutions.

== History ==
=== Geographical history ===
The site where the PLM campus in Intramuros is situated used to be occupied by the Colegio de Manila (also known as Colegio Seminario de San Ignacio, Colegio Máximo de San Ignacio, and, later, Universidad de San Ignacio; the first royal and pontifical university in the Philippines and in Asia), which was the first school in the Philippines. (Note: This is not the PLM of today). Aside from Colegio de Manila, there were other structures that were built on the site, such as Iglesia Santa Ana, the first stone church in the Philippines. Upon expulsion of the Jesuits from the Spanish Philippines, the buildings were transformed into military headquarters called Cuartel del Rey (also known as Cuartel de España), the same place where José Rizal was placed on trial for sedition here on December 26, 1896.

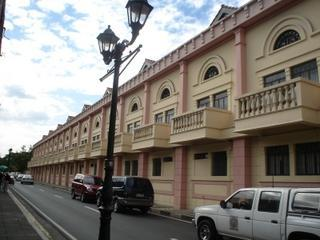
Don Pepe Atienza Hall, the building where most of the PLM graduate schools are situated

During the American occupation, the buildings and the whole premises served as military headquarters for the 31st Infantry of the United States Army until 1941. Its Quonset Gym held one of the first games played by member schools of the NCAA. In World War II, General Douglas MacArthur held a command post here, but the entire area was later destroyed by the ongoing military conflict.

In the early 1960s, the site was rehabilitated by the city government, and a building was constructed at General Luna Street to house the students of Manila High School. However, on April 24, 1965, President Diosdado Macapagal issued Proclamation No. 392-A, giving the proposed city university the 3-hectare (7.4-acre) lot being occupied by Manila High School. On February 26, 1967, the new complex along Victoria Street was inaugurated, and the students of Manila High School were transferred there. On July 17, 1967, the first batch of PLM scholars began their studies.

=== Establishment ===
PLM was conceived during the administration of Manila Mayor Arsenio H. Lacson, when he approved Ordinance No. 4202 on January 13, 1960, which appropriated PhP 1 million for the construction of the university. After Lacson died of a heart attack, he was succeeded by Vice Mayor Antonio Villegas, who continued with his plan.

On February 13, 1963, Villegas issued Executive Order No. 7 s-1963, creating a Planning and Working Committee, chaired by Benito F. Reyes, to draw up a plan to establish a city university.

Due to an impasse impeding the legislative action of the city council to formally create the university, Villegas interceded for the help of then-Congressman Justo Albert of the fourth congressional district of the City of Manila to sponsor a bill in the Congress seeking to create the university, which was passed by the House of Representatives in 1964 as House Bill No. 8349. The Senate version of the bill was spearheaded by senators Gil Puyat and Camilo Osías, which was passed by the Philippine Senate in 1965. The consolidation of the two bills was tackled during the Fourth Session of the Fifth Congress, which began and was held in Manila on January 25, 1965. The consolidated bill was thereafter passed by the joint Congress and was signed by Senate President Ferdinand E. Marcos and House Speaker Cornelio T. Villareal with Regino S. Eustaquio, Secretary of the Senate, and Inocencio B. Pareja, Secretary of the House of Representatives.

On June 19, 1965, the final bill, An Act Authorizing the City of Manila to Establish and Operate the University of the City of Manila and for Other Purposes, was signed into law by President Diosdado P. Macapagal in a ceremony in Malacañang Palace. The event was witnessed by Villegas, Congressman Ramon Mitra, Jr., de Leon, and its main sponsor in the House of Representatives, Congressman Justo Albert. The law was captioned as Republic Act No. 4196, which now serves as the university charter.

The Board of Regents, which is the governing body of the university, was formally organized in the same year as Villegas appointed the member thereof. The university regents were sworn into office during the historic day of January 9, 1967, and they conducted an election of officers on February 23, 1967. The members of the first Board of Regents were Atty. Carlos Moran Sison, chairman; Benito F. Reyes, vice chairman; Emilio Abello, Roman F. Lorenzo, Jose S. Roldan, and Primo L. Tongko, members; Fructuoso R. Yanson served as an ex-officio member, and Jose F. Sugay as its secretary. Reyes was chosen as PLM's first president.

In 1967, PLM started with a college for an associate in arts, and about a year later, a graduate institute for teachers and an institute for extramural studies were formed. Reyes aggressively expanded the PLM curriculum to include professional studies in arts and sciences, engineering, architecture, nursing, criminology, and government.

=== 21st century ===
==== Growth and expansion ====
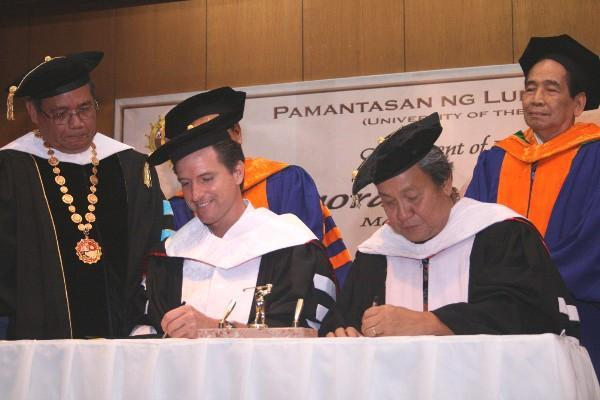
San Francisco City Mayor Gavin Newsom and Manila Mayor Lito Atienza during the renewal of the memorandum of understanding, cooperation, and exchange programs between the City College of San Francisco and PLM in 2006

At the turn of the 21st century, PLM admitted students from outside Manila on paying schemes for the first time. Many changes were made, and the university continued with its affiliations and consortium agreements with various educational institutions in the world.

Additional funds were made available for the university's physical development; many new facilities were built at the main campus, and the different departments, colleges, and schools were restructured. The university established a number of research units and made research consortium agreements with other institutions.

In 2000, the Pamantasang Limbagan ng Maynila (PLM University Press) was launched, the Development Center for Women Studies and Services was inaugurated, and the Manila Studies program was revived under the new Sentro ng Araling Manileno.

From 2001 to 2003, the PLM Board of Regents expanded the PLM curriculum to include professional studies in tourism, hotel and travel industry management, and physical education and recreational sports; supported the separation of the Department of Architecture from the College of Engineering and Technology; separated the Colleges of Arts and Sciences and the College of Public and Business Administration into new colleges: the College of Mass Communication, the College of Science, the College of Liberal Arts, the College of Accountancy and Economics, and the College of Management and Entrepreneurship; and merged the departments of social work, education, and psychology into the College of Human Development.

In 2001, Mayor Lito Atienza authorized the opening of three district colleges under the city government's university system. At about the same time, the integrated learning center for toddlers commenced through the initiative of the Center for University Extension Services (CUES). A year later, the PLM Open University increased its off-campus and distance learning programs to more qualified individuals throughout the country. It installed a general education curriculum and visiting professors agreement with its sister schools in Saudi Arabia and Thailand to allow overseas Filipinos to pursue their college education.

==== Campaign for Student Regency ====
In 2001, the Supreme Student Council (SSC), the university's student governing body, led the campaign for student representation at the PLM Board of Regents and made the PLM community cognisant of the issue. On January 15, 2002, Senator Francis Pangilinan filed Senate Bill No. 1967, or an act amending certain provisions of Republic Act No. 4196, which sought student representation on the Board of Regents.

==== English Proficiency Program ====
In July 2004, Mayor Lito Atienza spearheaded the development and implementation of the English Proficiency Program in all schools being funded by the city government. A committee on the use of English was formed a week after the directive was passed, headed by PLM President Benjamin Tayabas. A few weeks later, the English as a Second Language (ESL) Center was established at PLM before the program's full implementation on September 1. Initially, the city's campaign was derided by some critics and groups but later lauded and even followed by other institutions. Two years later, the American Chamber of Commerce in the Philippines and the European Chamber of Commerce in the Philippines began taking part in a massive English retooling effort among private and government schools in partnership with the Department of Education.

==== Continuing development ====
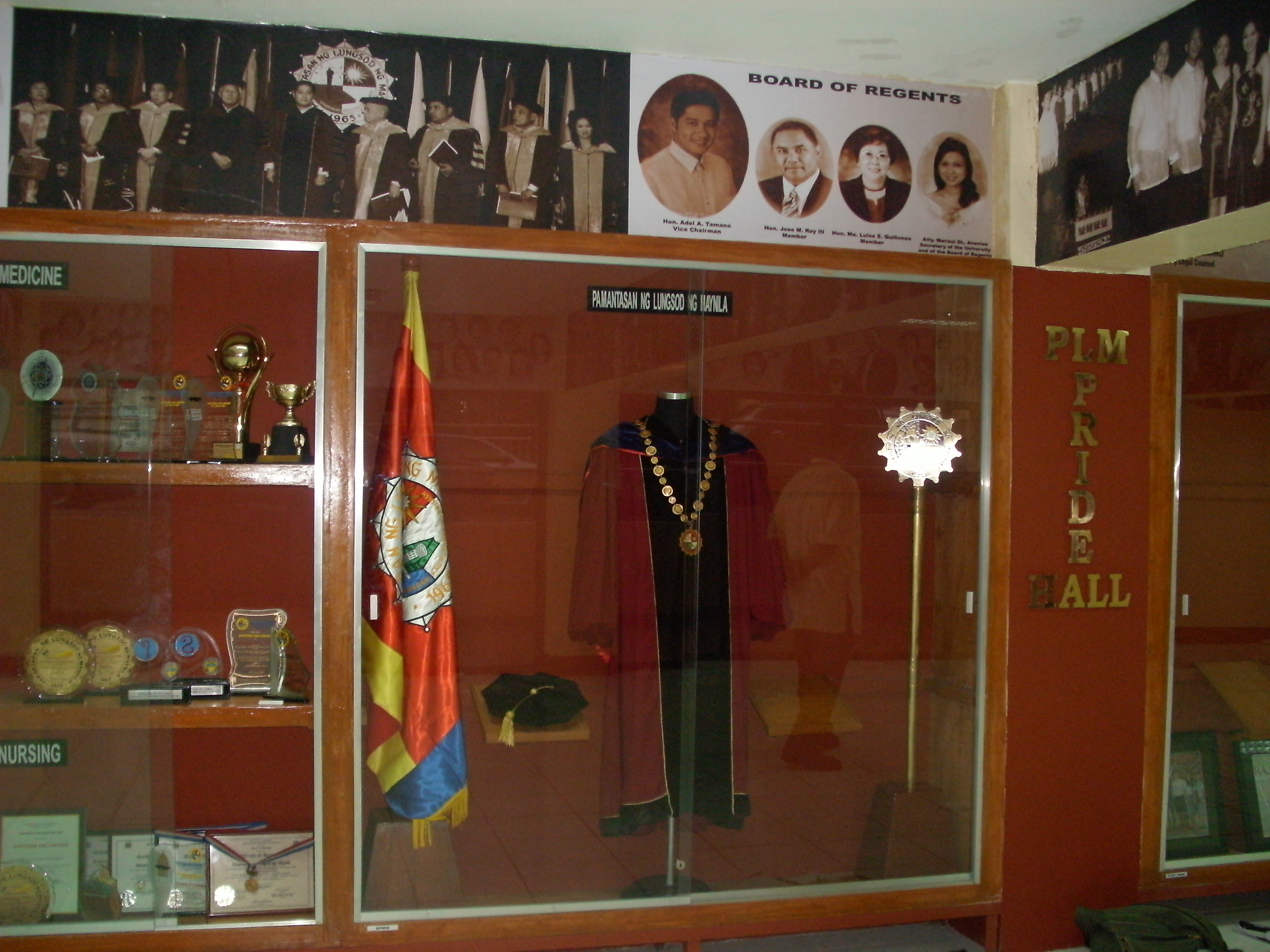
PLM Pride Hall, the silo of all recorded feats and achievements of the Pamantasan community

PLM continued refurbishing its facilities, including the repair of the school gymnasium and the creation of a faculty lounge and a health and wellness center.

In 2007, the President Ramon Magsaysay Entrepreneurial Center, and the University Activity Center were built through grants from the Philippine Congress. About two years later, two buildings, namely, Gusaling Intramuros (Intramuros Hall) and Bahay Maynila (Executive Building), were added. During the same period, PLM allocated PhP 2-3 million for the establishment of a restaurant near Baluarte de San Diego Gardens, operated by the College of Tourism, Hotel and Travel Industry Management.

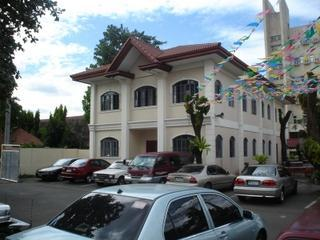
President Ramon Magsaysay Entrepreneurial Center, a venue for creative enterprise

Under the leadership of Adel Tamano, the administration increased the collection of PLM libraries and allotted PhP 5 million to purchase new books for 2008. Tamano also instituted reforms at PLM, such as implementing stricter admission and retention policies, providing tenures of office for deans of each school, upgrading the wage and non-wage benefits of employees, and enforcing zero tolerance on corruption, such as placing measures that would keep bidding and contract awarding transparent and open to scrutiny.

Towards the end of Tamano's presidency, the administration created an integrated communications network within the campus. Aside from restoring the PLM website and intensifying the university-wide Wi-Fi access, the university partnered with Smart Communications for the PLM School SIM and InfoBoard, which is a multi-module information medium and mobile gateway for the PLM community, and for the wireless engineering laboratory and operation GSM base station within the campus. It also collaborated with Microsoft for the activation of the official PLM Live@edu email address and online learning tools for its stakeholders.

===== Expansion plans =====
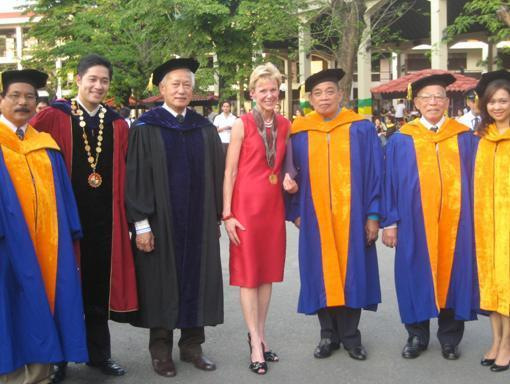
Manila Mayor Alfredo Lim, PLM President Adel Tamano, US Ambassador Kristie Kenney, and some members of the university administrative team

The PLM Administration conveyed its plan of building a city university system that would embrace all districts of Manila, as well as transform the main campus in Intramuros into a center for graduate studies and research, and include a science and technology institute and a polytechnic school in extension campuses. Likewise, they also expressed hope that the city government shall regain jurisdiction over Intramuros from the national government, because it is proven to be vital for the proposed expansion plans for PLM.

== Institution ==
=== Academics and administration ===
As a chartered and autonomous university, PLM is governed by a Board of Regents and administered by a president. The Board of Regents, the highest decision-making body of PLM, has the authority to grant diplomas, certificates, and titles to students who have completed their academic programs and validate the graduation of students. The six-member Board is composed of the president of PLM, a representative of the PLM faculty, a distinguished alumnus, a respected educator, one other respected professional, and the superintendent of the Division of City Schools – Manila. Each member serves a six-year tenure of office. The president oversees the implementation of the university policies.

Immediately under the president are the offices of four vice presidents — Executive Vice President, Vice President for Academic Affairs, Vice President for Administration, and Vice President for Finance and Planning.

The Presidents of the
Pamantasan ng Lungsod ng Maynila
University of the City of Manila
Benito F. Reyes, February 23, 1967 – June 23, 1972
Consuelo L. Blanco, December 21, 1972 – May 31, 1978
Ramon D. Bagatsing, June 1, 1978 – October 27, 1982
Jose D. Villanueva, January 14, 1983 – June 30, 1989
Benjamin Tayabas, July 1, 1989 – June 24, 1996
Virsely dela Cruz, June 25, 1996 – April 30, 1999
Ma. Corazon T. Veridiano (Acting President), May 1999 - December 1999
Atty. Emmanuel R. Sison (Officer-in-Charge), December 1999 - February 2000
Benjamin Tayabas, February 24, 2000 – August 1, 2007
Jose M. Roy III, (Acting President) February 23, 2006 – May 31, 2006
Atty. Adel A. Tamano, August 4, 2007 – November 30, 2009
Rafaelito M. Garayblas (Officer-in-Charge), December 1, 2009– June 30, 2013
Artemio G. Tuquero, July 1, 2013–September 2014
Ma. Leonora V. de Jesus, September 2014 – July 2019
Emmanuel A. Leyco, July 2019 – 2024
Domingo Reyes, Jr., July 2024 – Present

The university is organized into 12 undergraduate colleges, two professional schools, seven graduate schools, and an open university and distance learning program, which are all supervised by the executive vice president. These academic units collectively provide 53 single-degree undergraduate and 49 master's, doctoral, and graduate diploma programs.

The Arts and Sciences degree programs at the undergraduate level are conferred through the College of Accountancy and Economics, the College of Architecture and Urban Planning, the College of Engineering and Technology, the College of Human Development, the College of Liberal Arts, the College of Management and Entrepreneurship, the College of Mass Communication, the College of Nursing, the College of Physical Education, Recreation and Sports, the College of Physical Therapy, the College of Science, and the College of Tourism, Hotel and Travel Industry Management. Postgraduate studies are being administered through the Open University and distance learning program, the College of Law, the College of Medicine, and the six graduate schools, including the Emeritus College, the Graduate School of Arts, Sciences and Education, the Graduate School of Health Sciences, the Graduate School of Engineering, the Graduate School of Law, the Graduate School of Management, and the President Ramon Magsaysay Graduate School of Public Governance.

PLM is the tenth-largest university in Metro Manila, with a total student enrollment of 13,711 on January 20, 2006. For the undergraduate class of 2006–2007, PLM received 40,000 college applications, and accepted 3% of them. While admittance to the undergraduate colleges is exclusive for Manila residents, non-residents who have graduated either as salutatorian or valedictorian are entitled to take the PLM Admission Test and eventually qualify as freshmen. No specific residency requirements are imposed for the professional (law and medicine) and graduate schools. Full scholarships are entitled for Manila residents, while minimal fees are charged for non-residents. Other scholarships are available in the university, with funding coming from alumni donations, the government, and the private sector.

PLM's endowment in 2008 was valued at PhP 500 million, excluding budgetary allocation for its chief teaching hospital, the Ospital ng Maynila Medical Center, which was about PhP 250 million. The university spends about four to five times the national average for education.

PLM uses a semester-based modular system for conducting courses, adopts features of the US credit system, and employs the General Weighted Average (GWA) system and a 1.00 to 5.00 grading scale.

=== Social involvement ===
As one of the participating schools of medicine in "Bagong Doktor para sa Bayan" (lit. 'New Doctor for the Nation') of the national government, the College of Medicine requires that medical interns be stationed for months in far-flung barangays for experience and to apply community dynamics, family medicine theories, and appropriate technologies with the people of the community.

Students in the College of Nursing serve in 44 city-run health centers as part of their community health nursing internship. Senior students live with people in the rural areas for eight weeks and implement several socio-civic and health projects. Although not required to do so, they are encouraged to render service to the country before going abroad.

Physical therapy students in their last year in college are required to apply their learning in various settings, including rehabilitation centers in marginalized communities. As for the faculty members and students of the College of Human Development, they visit communities in Manila and assist in conducting activities such as teaching preschoolers in the city's barangay day care centers and tutoring out-of-school children through its alliance with the Educational Research and Development Assistance (ERDA) Foundation, which is the oldest non-government institution in the country that discourages impoverished children from dropping out of school. Similar activities are undertaken by the colleges that take on different approaches as in holding outreach programs in their fieldwork, off-campus activities and on-the-job training.

In 2009, PLM launched the Alternative Learning Program (ALP), which aims to provide a practical alternative to formal instruction, using both non-formal and informal sources of knowledge and skills.

The PLM communities have also joined Caritas Manila through the Intramuros Consortium Outreach and Environment Committee (ICOEC) in its dental and medical missions in various communities. In 1993, together with Tugon-RESCUE, the university's Community University Extension Services (CUES) continued with its outreach programs for the slum communities of Tondo. Since 1999, PLM, in cooperation with the Shalom Club of the Philippines-Manila Chapter and the Rotary Club of the Philippines, has been actively donating blood for the patients of the Ospital ng Maynila Medical Center, Ospital ng Tondo, and Dr. Jose R. Reyes Memorial Medical Center. Similar blood donation campaigns were conducted by other organizations within PLM, such as the "Patak-patak na Pagmamahal" by the PLM Samaritans, "Blood Rush" by the Brotherhood of Medical Scholars, and the "Operation Lifeline" by the PLM ROTC Unit. In July 2010, the Center for Community Extension Services (CUES) launched "Dugong Alay, Dugtong Buhay", a university-wide voluntary blood donation program that has unified and streamlined the various blood donating undertakings previously rendered by different groups and organizations inside the campus.

=== Research and development ===
PLM conducts studies and research projects that aim to aid in policy-making and in the production of prototypes that can be useful to both the university and the industry through the Intramuros Consortium and its own research division. PLM is one of the four academic institutions chosen as members of the Metropolitan Manila Industry and Energy Research and Development Consortium (MMIERDC) of the Department of Science and Technology. It is a member institution of the CHED Zonal Research Program for the National Capital Region.

=== Reputation ===
==== Rankings ====
There are no set methods for ranking institutions in the Philippines. Aside from comparisons in terms of accreditation, autonomy, and centers of excellence awarded by the Commission on Higher Education (CHED), there are attempts to rank schools based on performance in board exams conducted by the Professional Regulation Commission (PRC). The PRC and CHED sometimes publish reports on these results.

Based on the study using cumulative data from 1994 to 1998, PLM emerged sixth. For the ten-year period from 1992 to 2001, PLM placed ninth. In the study covering 1999 to 2003, PLM placed fifth, making it one of the two public universities in the top five list.

No follow-up rankings had been made as of 2021. However, CHED executive director Julito Vitriol said in 2009 that they were in the process of establishing appropriate guidelines to rank universities and colleges for each specific academic program or discipline.

== Campus ==
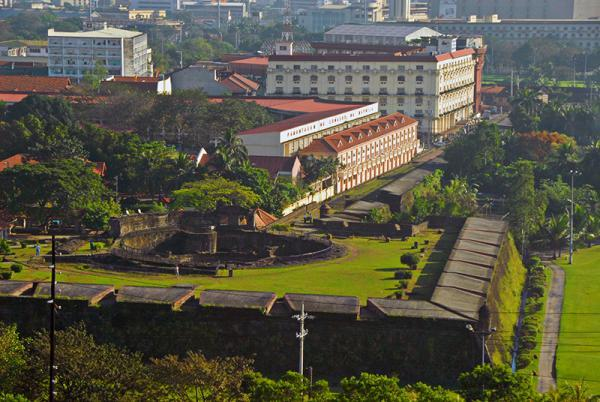
The PLM campus in Intramuros

The PLM campus is situated along General Luna and Muralla Streets in Manila's historical Intramuros district. This three-hectare (7.4-acre) campus is centered on an open field, where the PLM Grandstand can be found.

Except for the Gusaling Arsenio Lacson (Arsenio Lacson Hall), all buildings inside the campus possess a 19th-century or Hispanic architectural design. The mouldings, window and door material, grillwork, and panelling depict the details of the bahay na bato. The different buildings are either separate or interconnected with one another.

The university's academic and recreational facilities include an amphitheater, audiovisual rooms, an auditorium, campus-wide Wi-Fi, an entrepreneurial center, a fitness center, free Internet stations, a gymnasium, an integrated learning center for toddlers, library units, a physical therapy clinic, a university health service unit, a pride hall, a printing press, research and specialized centers, and science, communications, and engineering laboratories.

== Student life ==
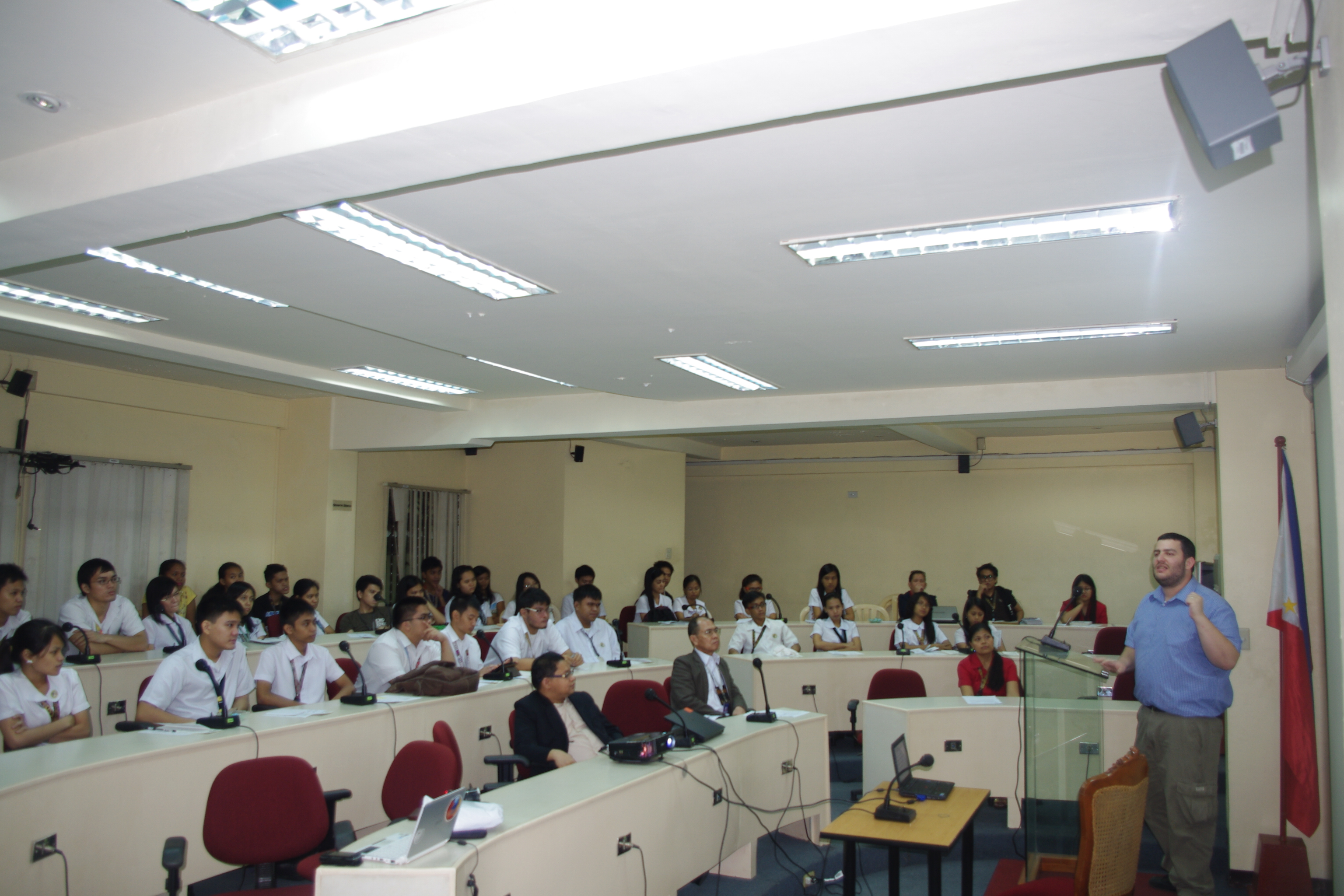
Inside a lecture room of the university

Students of PLM have access to a variety of activities while not attending class. The university offers intramural sports, cultural shows, and over 50 student and employee organizations. Fraternities and sororities play a role in the university's social life. LifeBox-PLM, PLM-Student Catholic Action, Youth for Christ, Bible Readers' Society, and Seeds of the Nation (SONS) are some of the well-known religious groups. There are also engineering projects teams, including the Microcontrollers and Robotics Society, which have earned a number of recognitions in national-level competitions, and debate teams, such as the Speech and Debate Society and the Economics Society. The university also showcases many community service organizations and charitable projects, including the Lightbearer Society, PLM Samaritans, the Brotherhood of Medical Scholars, and Legal Aid and Youth Advocacy (LAYA), among others.

The university sponsors and implements a comprehensive student services program coordinated by the Office of Student Development and Services (OSDS). The President's Committee on Arts and Culture (PCAC) is responsible for building up the artistry and craft of the PLM students through its different cultural organizations, such as the Hiyas ng Maynilad Dance Troupe, PLM Rondalla, PLM Chorale, and the Mabuhay Marching Band. Marulaya is the pioneer theater arts group of PLM, created in 1998.

The PLM Activity Center is a venue for many events. Homecoming coincides with various festivities to draw past students back to campus. The university hosts notable speakers each year, largely because of the success of the President Ramon Magsaysay School of Public Governance Lecture Series, the Dean's Lecture Series, and the Ramon Magsaysay Awardees' Lecture Series. These are frequently Ramon Magsaysay Awardees who visit PLM while in the capital, as well as scholars, politicians, authors, and religious leaders. Different organizations, clubs, and research units host numerous symposia and fora on various issues and topics.

Concerts and variety shows are commonly held at the PLM Grandstand and Open Field as well as in the Justo Albert Auditorium. In the middle of 2008, the university grounds became a music hall and camp for participants of Opusfest, the international piano and chamber music festival. Master classes with interactive performances conducted by international concert artists were open to the PLM community. Before the end of 2009, PLM was one of the two Philippine educational institutions that participated in the 36th Ship for Southeast Asian Youth Program (SSYEAP), a Japanese government-funded cultural exchange program that promotes friendship and mutual understanding among young people from Southeast Asian nations and Japan.

The student government at PLM is the Supreme Student Council (SSC), governed by a student elected as president. Aside from the SSC, which acts as the central student government body within PLM, there are college-based student councils as well. Traditionally, there are only two university-wide student political parties, namely Bukluran Party and Partidong Tugon , that annually participate in the student council elections. Tracing its roots from the former Sandigan Party, Bukluran was founded in 1995, while Tugon started in 1991 and AYOS! emerged in 2002. A longstanding goal of some members of the student government and political parties is to create a student-designated seat on the Board of Regents, the university's governing body.

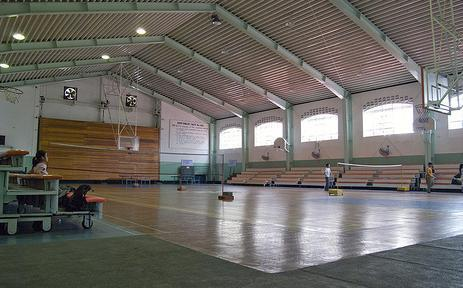
Rajah Sulayman Gymnasium, the home of PLM's athletic teams

In 1979, seven years after its predecessor HASIK was padlocked following the declaration of martial law, Ang Pamantasan, PLM's official university-wide student publication, was born. Through the years, the publication has faced censorship, but it has stood up for campus press freedom and continued to serve as a watchdog of the PLM community. There are also several administrative, university-wide, and college-based publications and academic journals being circulated at PLM.

The PLM community regularly organizes inter-university invitational games and dual meets in major sporting events, participates in the Manila Youth Games and Manila Marathon, conducts its very own Student Intramural Games, and participates in the Alculympics, a sports organization composed of 18 local colleges and universities nationwide.

In a response to the arrest of Maria Ressa in February 2019, the PLM Supreme Student Council released a statement against attacks on press freedom. In response, the university administration later imposed rules that prevented students from discussing national issues while threatening students with possible expulsion proceedings. The students later protested over the university's policies, in solidarity with the national Black Friday protest.

In October 2022, PLM issued an administrative order on the new uniform policy, formally removing the sex-based guidelines and giving the students options on whichever uniform to wear, with certain exemptions, in a move to demonstrate that the university "is a safe space for academic freedom and gender expression." The said order took effect the following month, which traces its roots to the progressive points deliberated and advanced for the PLM Dress Code under Disciplinary Policies of the Student Manual Revision Committee, Academic Year 2021-2022.

== Symbols ==
=== Motto and hymn ===
PLM's motto is "Karunungan, Kaunlaran, Kadakilaan". The Filipino motto literally translates to "Knowledge, Progress, Greatness", which are the university's guiding principles. The official hymn is entitled "Pamantasang Mahal" (lit. '"Beloved University"').

=== Seal ===
The Seal of the Pamantasan ng Lungsod ng Maynila

The University Seal was designed by Arch. Carlos da Silva. By way of Board Resolution No. 39, the Board of Regents official accepted the seal on its 16th official meeting on June 17, 1967, at the Mayor's Office at the Manila City Hall, describing it as:

A circular shield framed with fourteen triangles, depicting a sunbeam, with embossed inscription: "Pamantasan ng Lungsod ng Maynila 1965" all in gold. The field within is divided quarterly. The upper dexter field is in red, the lower sinister field in light blue, and the upper sinister field and lower dexter field in white. On the upper dexter side, the sunburst in white and gold rays are placed on a red field. The upper sinister side has a flaming torch on the tip of a bamboo handle superimposed over the symbol of the atomic orbits with electrons in red, placed on a white field. On the lower center point is a book superimposed with a bamboo scroll with ancient Tagala script balanced by a branch of the Nilad shrub in light green, all placed between the lower white and light blue fields. From the lower dexter side to the lower sinister side are inscribed in gold: "Karunungan, Kaunlaran, Kadakilaan." The circular shield is divided into four quadrants, representing the then-four congressional districts of Manila, while the fourteen triangles or radiating spires stand for the administrative districts (also known as the geographical districts) of Tondo, Binondo, Quiapo, San Nicolas, Santa Cruz, Sampaloc, San Miguel, Ermita, Intramuros, Malate, Paco, Pandacan, Port Area, and Santa Ana.

=== Colors ===
The university colors are golden yellow, flaming red, light blue, and green. The golden yellow signifies nobility, wealth, and power; white signifies light, truth, and faith; light blue signifies brotherly love and peace; red signifies patriotism, bravery, and sacrifice; and green signifies hope.

== Faculty ==
A master's degree is required as part of minimum requirements for permanency. Notable current and former instructors and administrators include:

Name	Field of Expertise or Post Held as a Luminary	Relationship to PLM
Efren R. Abueg	Writer and winner of Carlos Palanca Awards	Professor, PLM College of Mass Communication
Oswaldo Agcaoili	former Justice of the Court of Appeals	Professor, PLM College of Law
Rica Arevalo	Filmmaker; Winner in the 2005 Cinemalaya Independent Film Festival	Professor, PLM College of Mass Communication
Elvert Bañares	Filmmaker, producer, Film Programmer/Curator and multidisciplinary Artist; Founder, CineKasimanwa & Bakunawa Film Festivals; Three-time Gawad CCP Winner for Independent Film; Gawad URIAN nominee; Regional Manager, Cinemalaya in Visayas 2019	Professor, PLM College of Mass Communication
Don Bagatsing	Councilor of Manila	Professor, PLM
Celso Benologa	Chancellor, University of the East, Manila campus	Professor, PLM Graduate School of Management
Howard Calleja	National Legal Counsel PPCRV	Professor, PLM College of Law
Rustica Carpio	Author	Founder and Dean, PLM College of Mass Communication
Jasper Jugan	Vice-President, Philippine .NET Users Group;	Lecturer, PLM College of Engineering and Technology
Aurora Soriano Cudal	Educator; July 12, 2003 was proclaimed "Aurora Cudal Day" in San Diego, California	College Secretary, PLM College of Medicine; Director, CUES; Executive Director, PLM Concern Foundation (1988–1992)
Eustaquia Ticao Acevedo	President, 1993-1994, Association of Philippine Medical Colleges Foundation Inc. (APMC, Inc.); Board of Trustees, 1986-1992, Ospital ng Maynila Medical Center; Former Governing Board Member, Metro Manila Health Science Community	Dean, PLM College of Medicine (1987-1997); Part-time Professorial Lecturer, 2007 – 2022
Rommel L. delos Reyes	Chief physical therapist of De La Salle Green Archers; former chief physical therapist of the 2005 Southeast Asian Games	Professor, PLM College of Physical Therapy
Raul I. Goco	First Filipino elected president of the World Jurist Association, an organization based in Washington, D.C.; Solicitor General of the Philippines; Ambassador to the U.N. and Canada	Dean, PLM College of Law; Member, PLM Board of Regents
Angelina Sandoval-Gutierrez	Former Associate Justice of the Philippine Supreme Court and the first recipient of the prestigious Cayetano Arellano Award as an Outstanding RTC Judge of the Philippines for 1990	Dean and Part-time Faculty, PLM Graduate School of Law
Katrina Legarda	Family law expert; Prosecutor, author and TV host	Professor, PLM College of Law
Alito L. Malinao	News Editor, Manila Standard; Author of Journalism for Filipinos and Campus and Community Journalism Handbook	Professor, PLM College of Mass Communication
Ernesto M. Maceda	Philippine Senate President and Ambassador	Professor, PLM College of Law
Antonio Eduardo Nachura	Philippine Supreme Court Associate Justice, Prosecutor of the House of Representatives of the Philippines during the Impeachment Trial of President Joseph Estrada	Professor, PLM College of Law
Roberto "Obet" Pagdanganan	Governor of Bulacan; Secretary, Department of Agrarian Reform (DAR), and Department of Tourism (DOT); Senior Executive of Unilever; Radio commentator at GMA Super Radyo DZBB 594	Professor
Diosdado M. Peralta	Sandiganbayan Presiding Justice; Assistant Solicitor General; Associate Justice, Supreme Court of the Philippines	Professor, PLM College of Law and PLM Graduate School of Law
Benito F. Reyes	Academic	First University President
Alejandro Roces	National Artist; Secretary, Department of Education, President, Manila Bulletin; Columnist, The Philippine Star; Chairman, College Assurance Plan	Chairman, PLM Board of Regents
Tranquil Salvador III	Filipino lawyer, educator, civic leader, and media advocate for mainstreaming and popularizing law education in the Philippines. He has served as spokesperson and member of the defense panel for the impeachment of the then-Chief Justice Renato Corona	Professor, PLM College of Law
Adel A. Tamano	Spokesperson, Genuine Opposition	University President; Vice-Chairman, PLM Board of Regents; Professor, PLM College of Law
Benjamin G. Tayabas	First foreign recipient of the Cultural Education Award from the Christian Academy of the Arts in Seoul, Korea; Winner of the Dangal ng Pinoy for Education in RPN 9; the Jaycees Senate Outstanding Filipino in the field of Education	University President; Vice chairman, PLM Board of Regents

== Alumni ==
PLM has approximately 50,000 alumni since its formal opening in 1967. Alumni hold a variety of positions and jobs throughout the world. PLM students and graduates are nicknamed PLMayers.

Some notable alumni have served the Philippine government both at the national and local levels, such as Senator Ping Lacson, Bohol Congressman Edgar Chatto, Manila Congressman Nestor Ponce, Jr., Samar Congressman Antonio Eduardo Nachura, Sorsogon Congressman Jose Solis, Caloocan Mayor Rey Malonzo, Manila Mayor Isko Moreno, Department of Environment and Natural Resources and former Manila City Mayor Lito Atienza, among others.

In literature and journalism, PLM has produced two recipients of Carlos Palanca Awards, such as Manuel Buising and Marlon Miguel, as well as a winner of a journalism award, Jason Gutierrez (Asia Human Rights Press Awards by Amnesty International). Other authors and media personalities include award-winning screenwriters and directors like Adolfo Alix Jr., Roy C. Iglesias, Florida M. Bautista, Real Florido, and StarStruck creator Rommel Gacho.

In entertainment and television, PLM is represented by multi-awarded comedian Michael V., pop singer Aicelle Santos, comedian and theater actor Jerald Napoles, and drama actors Isko Moreno and Robert Ortega.

PLM alumni serving as CEOs or holding key positions in companies include Wilma Galvante (Senior Vice-President for Entertainment at GMA Network), Jerry Isla (Chairman and Senior Partner, Isla Lipana & Co.), Fe Tibayan-Palileo (Commissioner, Social Security System; Governor and Treasurer, Employers Confederation of the Philippines), Alvin M. Pinpin (Partner, SyCip Gorres Velayo & Co.), Rolando G. Peña (President and CEO of Smart Broadband; Head of Network Services Division, Smart Communications), Edith A. del Rosario (Assistant General Manager for Operations, RPN), Roberto del Rosario (Vice President for Operations, IBC), Roberto Juanchito T. Dispo (Senior Vice President of First Metro Investment Corporation, a wholly owned investment bank subsidiary of Metrobank), Ricardo F. de Leon (Executive Vice President of Centro Escolar University and former President of Mindanao State University), Director Nicanor A. Bartolome (Deputy Director-General of the Philippine National Police), Eduardo Cabantog M.D. (President Chief Executive Officer, and Director, Alliance In Motion Global, Inc.), and others.

PLM alumni in academia and research include business management guru Conrado E. Iñigo, Jr., nurse-educator and author Carlito Balita, Division of City Schools – Manila Superintendent María Luisa Quiñones, immunology expert and first Filipino cosmonaut-doctor Senen A. Reyes, and others.

On the global stage, PLM has produced a Pulitzer Prize winner, Manuel Mogato.

=== In popular culture ===
PLM has served as the alma mater for a number of fictional characters of internationally acclaimed films, including Alessandra De Rossi's fictional persona in Mga Munting Tinig and Nora Aunor's role as Claudia in Care Home: The Movie. In 2007, the now-defunct teen-orientated show Click put on a reality show dubbed Click Barkada Hunt, which involved the different love teams who had to undergo various challenges. In one of the challenges, they posed as professors of PLM. In the 2022 GMA television series Maria Clara at Ibarra, Barbie Forteza plays the role of Maria Clara "Klay" Infantes, a nursing student from PLM who later finds herself transported into the world of Noli Me Tángere and El filibusterismo.

== Gallery ==
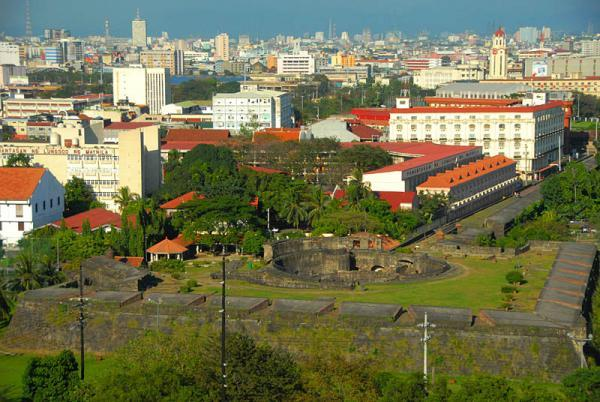
The PLM campus in Intramuros and its vicinity as seen from the Manila Hotel

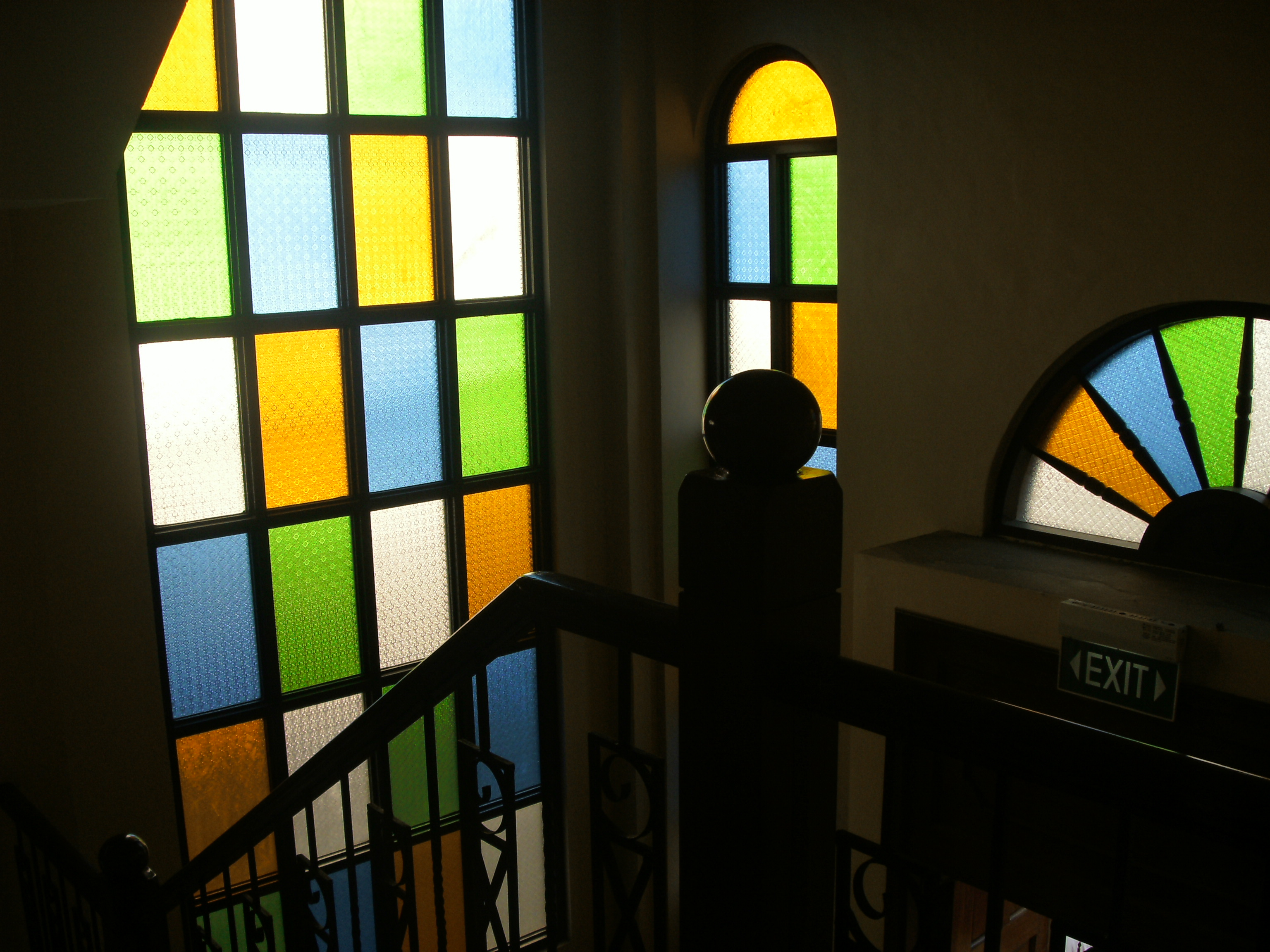
Gusaling Intramuros colorful windows

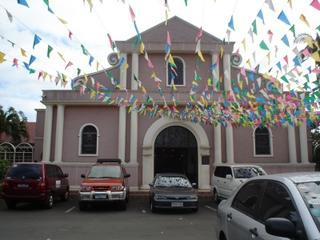
PLM Chapel

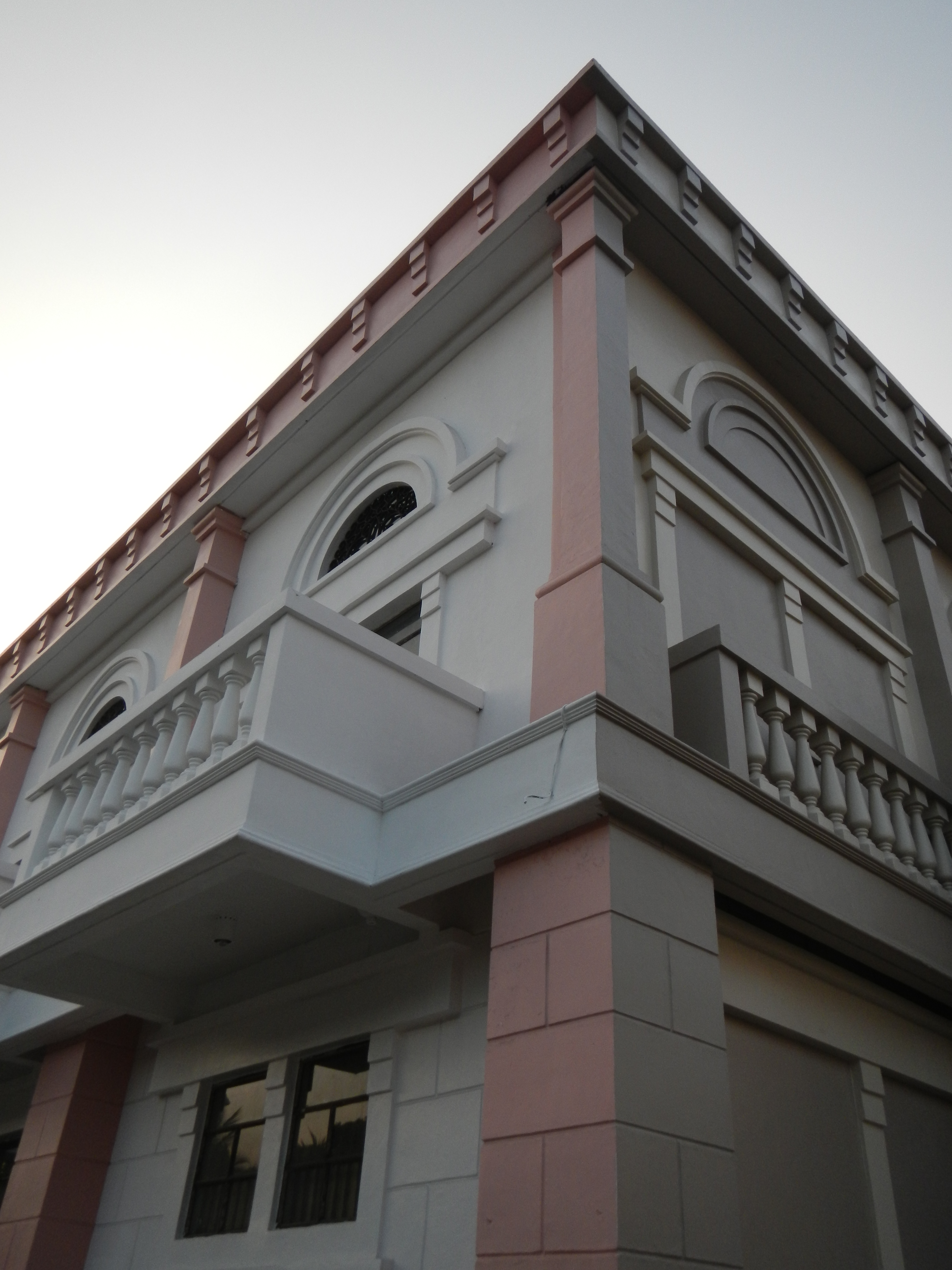
Two-point View Gusaling Atienza

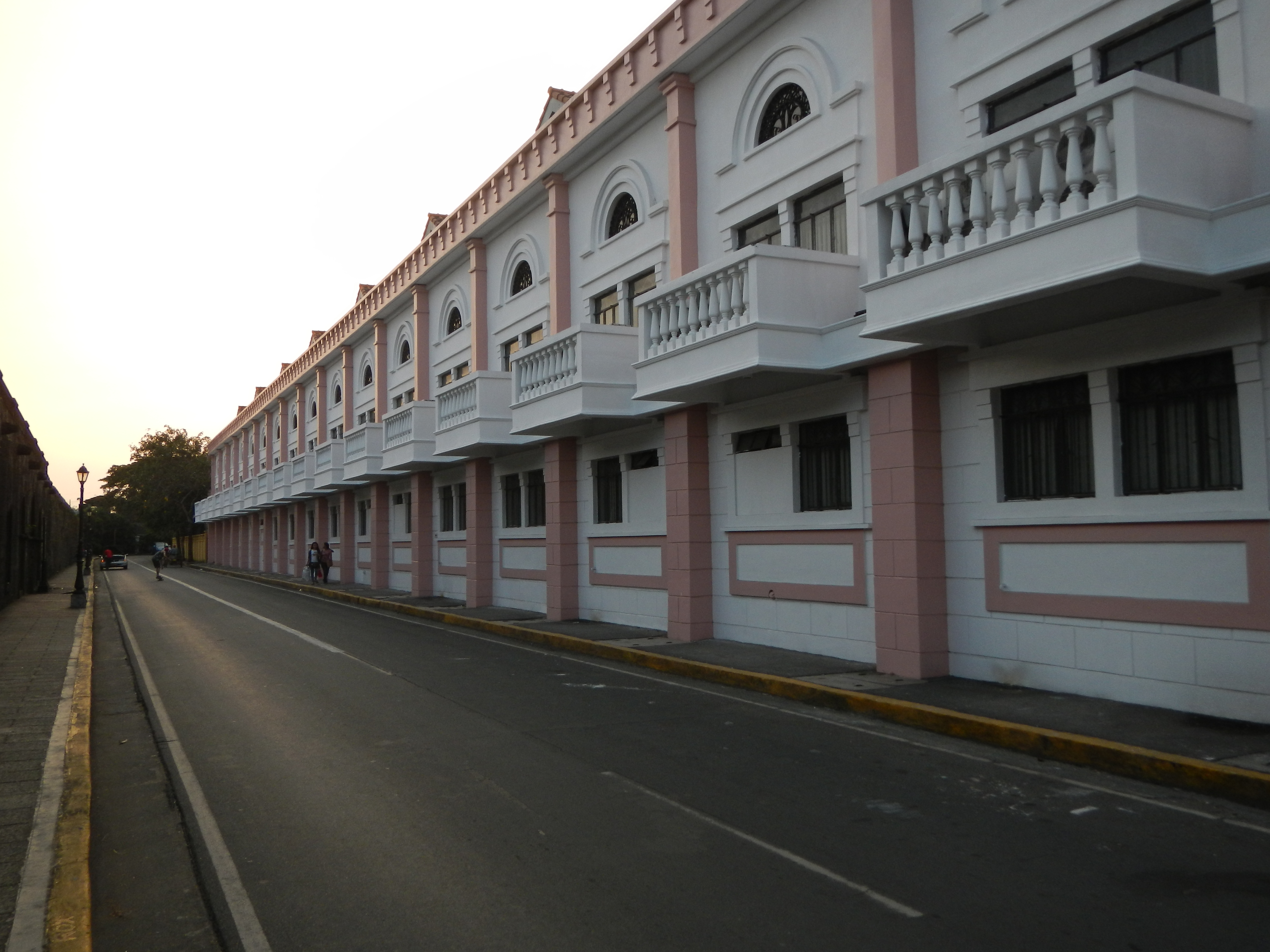
Details of the exterior

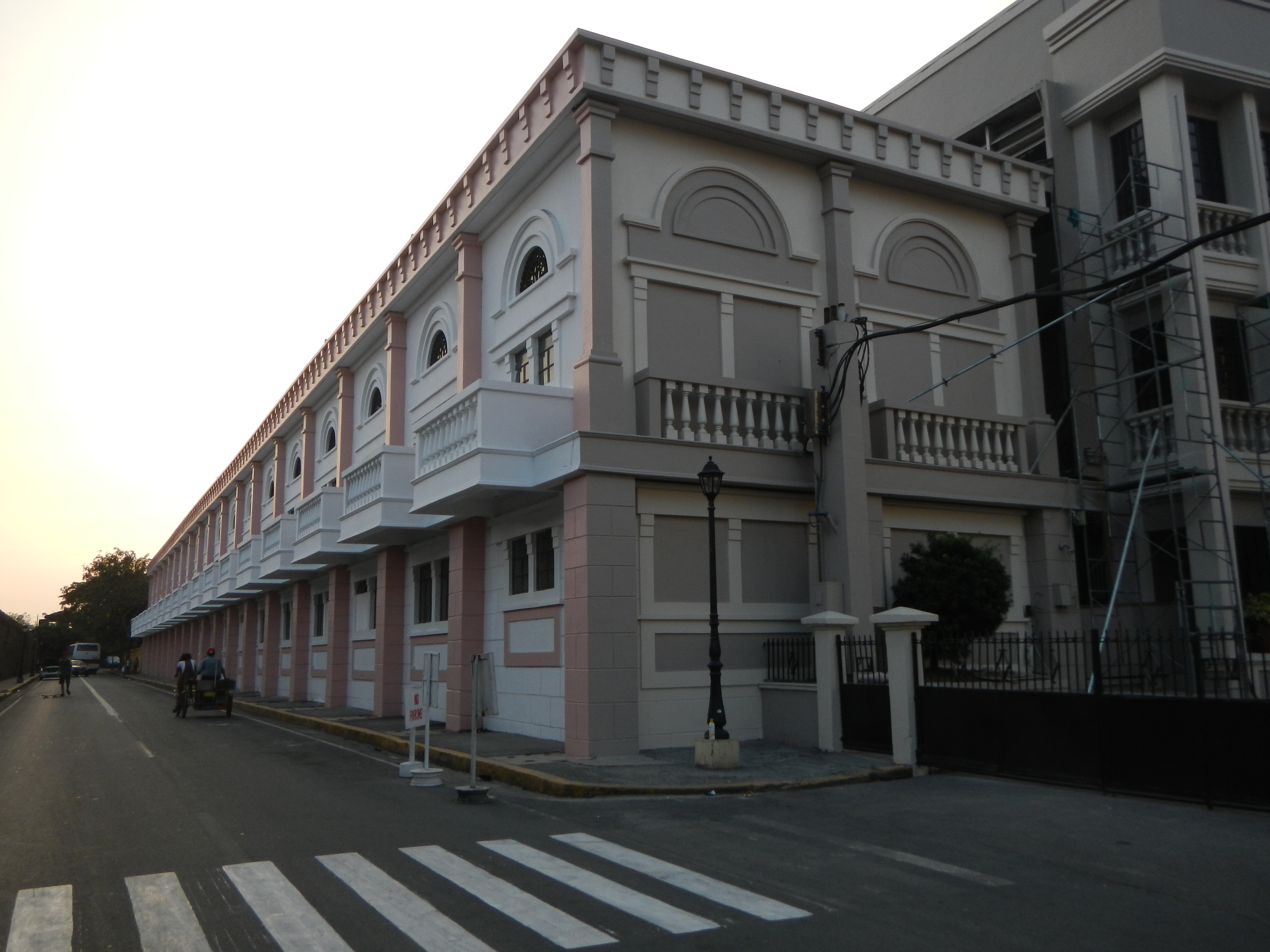
Details of the exterior

== See also ==
- List of Pamantasan ng Lungsod ng Maynila faculty
- Universidad de Manila, the other city university of Manila
- University of the Philippines Manila, the component university of the University of the Philippines system in Manila
- University of Manila, a private university in Manila
