= Santo Niño =

Santo Niño, which means "holy child", is a Spanish title for the Christ Child (Jesus Christ as a child) and may also refer to:

== Representations of Jesus ==
- Santo Niño de Cebú, oldest Filipino representation of the Child Jesus
- Santo Niño de Tondo, second-oldest Filipino representation of the Child Jesus
- Santo Niño de Arévalo, third-oldest Filipino representation of the Child Jesus
- Santo Niño de Tacloban, a Filipino representation of the Child Jesus that arrived in Tacloban City, Leyte in 1770
- Santo Niño de Atocha, a Hispanic representation of the Child Jesus
- Santissimo Gesu de Malines (Infant Jesus of Mechelen), a Dutch representation of the Child Jesus that greatly resembles the image from Cebú
- Niño Dios of Mexico, Mexican representations of the Infant Jesus
- Niñopa, a depiction of the Baby Jesus that is considered to be the most popular of all the Niño Dios icons in Mexico.
- Divino Niño, a Colombian representation of the Infant Jesus
- Santo Bambino of Aracoeli, an Italian representation of the Infant Jesus
- Santo Niño de la Salud (Holy Infant of Good Health), a Child Jesus depiction from Morelia (Michoacán State), Mexico
- Santo Niño Jesus de la Praga (Infant Jesus of Prague), a representation of the Child Jesus in the Czech Republic
- Bambino Gesu of Arenzano, a Child Jesus depiction from Genoa, Italy

== People other than Jesus ==
- Santo Niño de La Guardia, a Christian child allegedly murdered by Jews; cult suppressed as veneration was part of blood libel
- Saint Nino, a saint from Georgia

== Places ==
=== Mexico ===
- El Santo Niño, Baja California Sur

=== Philippines ===
- Santo Niño, a barangay of the municipality of Angono in the Rizal province
- Archdiocesan Shrine of Santo Niño de Arevalo in Arevalo, Iloilo City
- Santo Niño, Cagayan
- Archdiocesan Shrine of the Santo Niño de Tacloban in Tacloban City, Leyte
- Santo Niño, Samar
- Santo Niño, South Cotabato
- Santo Niño, Parañaque in Metro Manila
- Santo Niño de Tondo Parish in Metro Manila
- Basilica Minore del Santo Niño in Cebu City
- Santo Niño de Paombong in Paombong Bulacan
- Señor Santo Niño de Kalibo in Kalibo Aklan

== See also ==
- Nino (disambiguation)
