= Church of Our Lady of Victories =

Church in Prague

- The Church of Our Lady of Victory and Saint Anthony of Padua
- Shrine of the Infant Jesus of Prague
- Kostel Panny Marie Vítězné
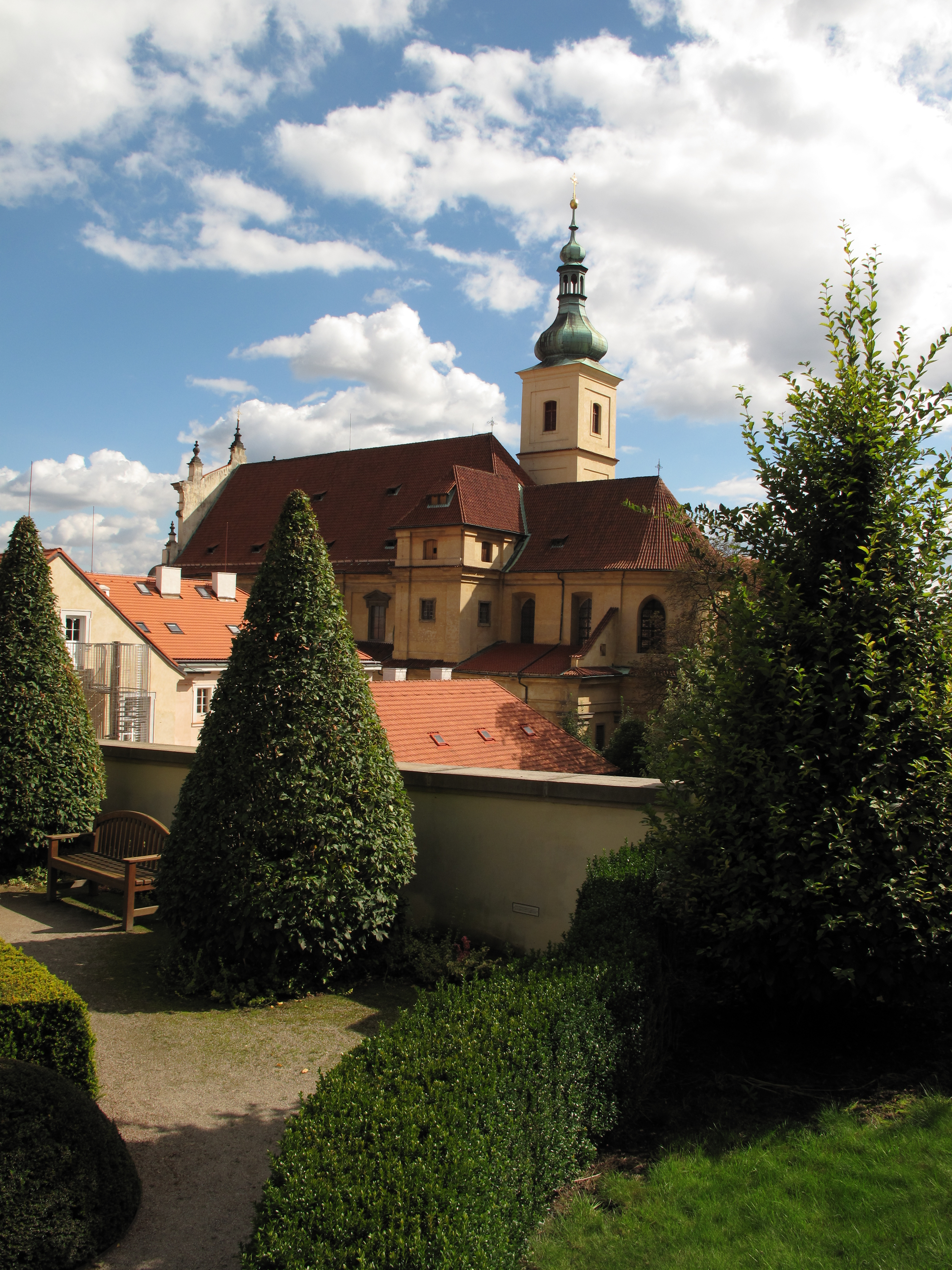

- Location in Czech Republic
- 50°05′09″N 14°24′13″E
- Location: Prague
- Country: Czech Republic
- Denomination: Catholic
- Previous denomination: Lutheran
- Website: www.pragjesu.cz

History
- Former name: Church of the Holy Trinity
- Status: Active
- Founded: 1584
- Dedication: Our Lady of Victories
- Consecrated: 8 September 1624

Architecture
- Architectural type: Church
- Style: Baroque
- Years built: 1611–1613
- Completed: 1613

Administration
- Archdiocese: Prague

Clergy
- Archbishop: Dominik Duka
- Rector: Anastasio Roggero

The Church of Our Lady of Victories (Czech: Kostel Panny Marie Vítězné), also referred as the Shrine of the Infant Jesus of Prague, in Malá Strana, the "Lesser Quarter" of Prague, is a church governed and administered by the Discalced Carmelites.

The shrine is home to the famed statue called the Infant Jesus of Prague. The statue, which originated in Spain, is a 16th-century representation of infant Child Jesus holding a globus cruciger. It was donated to the Carmelite friars in 1628 by Polyxena, First Princess of the House of Lobkowicz.

Pope Leo XII granted its first pontifical decree of canonical coronation on 24 September 1824, signed and notarized by Cardinal Pietro Francesco Galleffi for the Patriarchal Council of the "Vatican Chapter", as the first Christological image granted this prestigious honor. On 30 March 1913, Pope Pius X granted authorization to erect the Confraternity of the Infant Jesus of Prague based on former regulations promulgated by Pope Clement VIII, which was signed and notarized by Cardinal Rafael Merry del Val. Pope Benedict XVI crowned the image for the second time during his Apostolic visit to the Czech Republic on 26 September 2009. The venerated image, along with its canoness custodians celebrated its 200 years of pontifical coronation in 2024.

== History ==
A chapel dedicated to the Holy Trinity was built on this site in 1584. Following Rudolph II's Letter of Majesty a larger church in the style of a Roman basilica was built around 1611 for German Lutherans. With the Battle of White Mountain, 8 November 1620, the Counter-Reformation signaled the re-Catholicism of Prague. In 1624, the Holy Roman Emperor Ferdinand II turned the church over to the Carmelites, and the church was consecrated to "Our Lady of Victories and Saint Anthony of Padua". The venerated Marian altarpiece of Our Lady of Victory was sent from Rome by Pope Gregory XV.

Near the monastery, the friars established a seminary garden with artificial ponds where they raised fish. The monastery was abolished on 3 June 1784 by Joseph II, Holy Roman Emperor, and administration of the church assigned to the Knights of Malta.

== Architecture ==
=== Exterior ===
Reconstruction of the church was begun in 1636, along with a monastery. Baltasar Marradas donated the funds for construction of the front facade, which was built in 1664. Above the entrance is a statue of "Our Lady with the Child Jesus". A tower was added in 1669.

=== Interior ===
On the right is the Chapel of Our Lady with a 1626 statue of the Madonna; on the left is the Chapel of the Holy Cross, which formerly housed the statue of the Infant of Prague from 1656 to 1776. The altar paintings of Saint Joachim, Saint Anne and Apostle Simon are by Petr Brandl.

== Shrine ==
In 1638 Princess Lobkowicz donated to the friars a small statue of the Infant Jesus, which they placed in their novitiate chapel. In 1631 soldiers of Gustavus Adolphus of Sweden plundered the city, and the statue was lost. In 1637, the Carmelites returned to Prague and found the discarded statue. The cultus of the Infant of Prague spread, particularly in Spain, the country of the statue's origin.

Two years later the statue was placed in the choir, and in 1656 moved to a small chapel in the church (now the Chapel of the Holy Cross). In 1776 a new red-and-grey marble altar for the shine was built. With the abolition of the monastery under Joseph II, the church and its shrine fell into neglect.

In 1879, funds were raised for the restoration of the shrine altar. In 1928, Prague celebrated the 300th anniversary of veneration of the Infant Jesus. During the Nazi occupation of World War II and the subsequent communist regime, veneration at the shrine was discouraged, although pilgrims from Spanish-speaking countries continued to make their way to Prague.

At the request of the Archbishop of Prague Miloslav Vlk, the Discalced Carmelites returned to the church after two hundred years of absence on 2 July 1993. The Carmelite Sisters of the Child Jesus help the Carmelites with the care of the statue and the church. The pilgrimage church is under the parish administration of the Church of St. Thomas in Mala Strana.

=== Visit of Pope Benedict XVI ===
On 26 September 2009 Pope Benedict XVI declared the church and the Infant Jesus the first station on the Apostolic Road in the Czech Republic. The Pontiff also donated a gold crown, decorated with eight shells, pearls, and garnet gemstones to the Infant Jesus of Prague, which rests above the statue today.

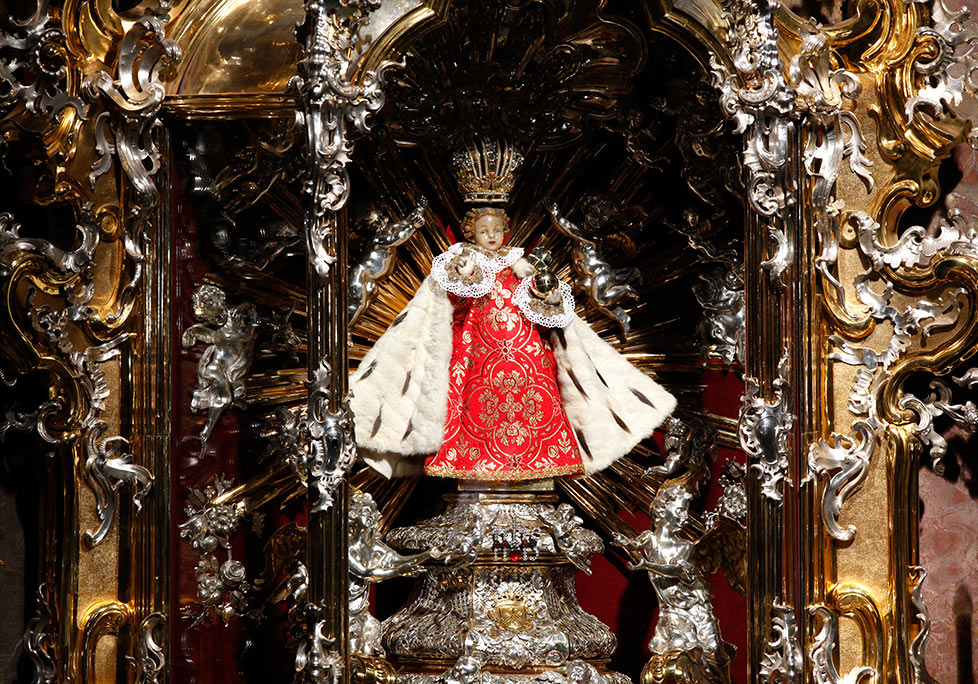
The famous Child Jesus of Prague statue located in the church

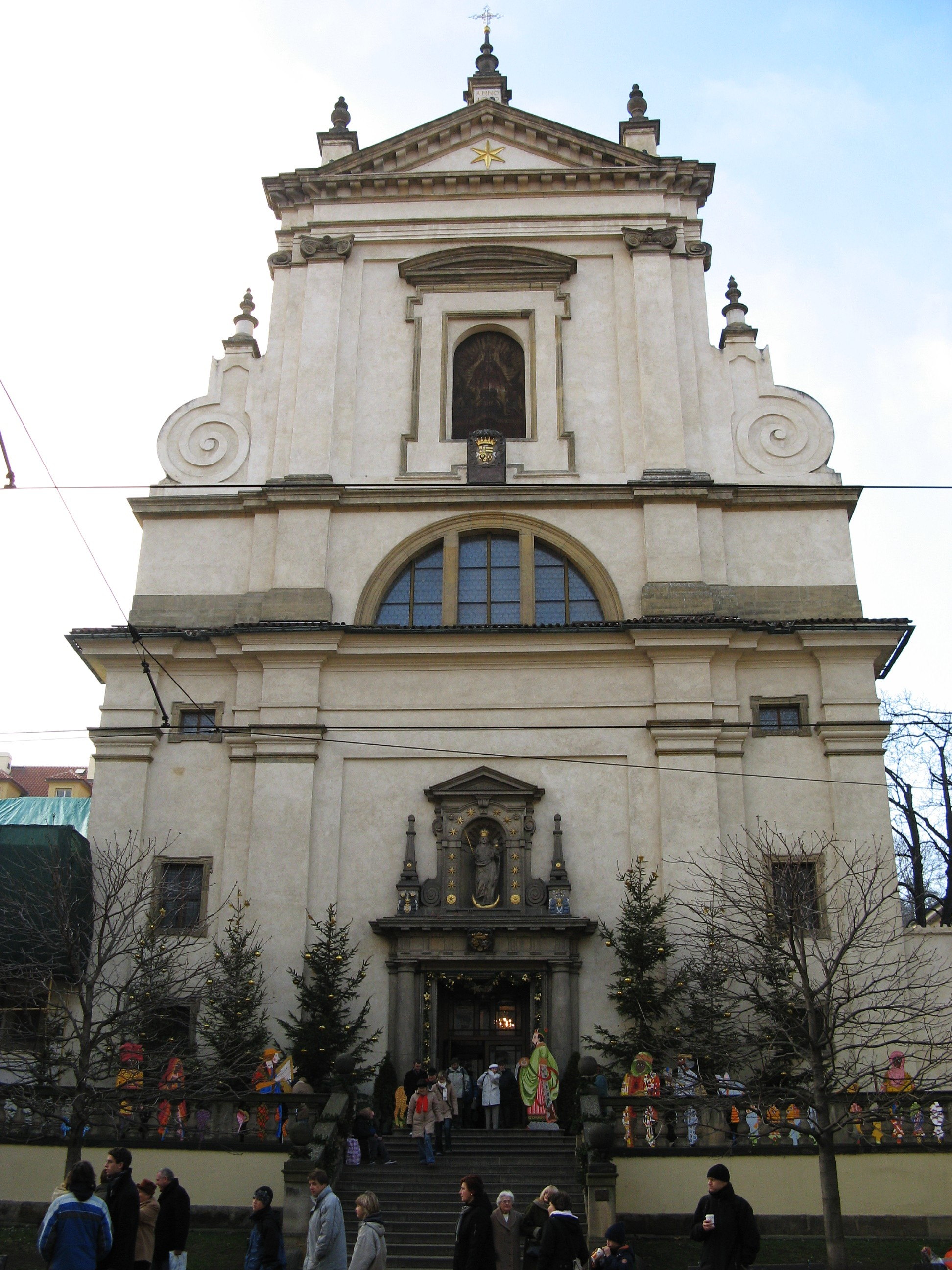
The front of the Church of Our Lady of Victories

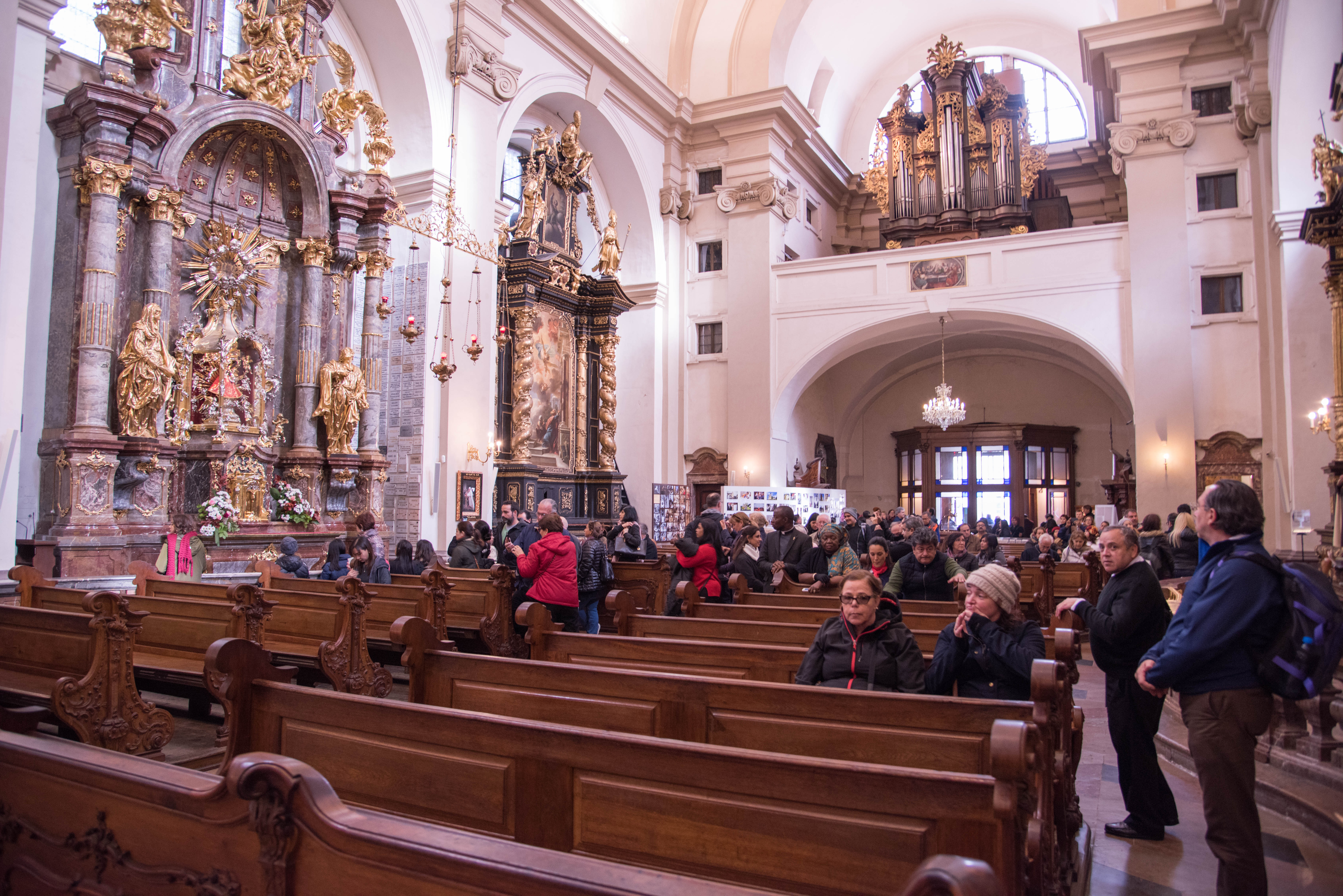
Pilgrims inside the church looking to the altar of the Infant Jesus of Prague

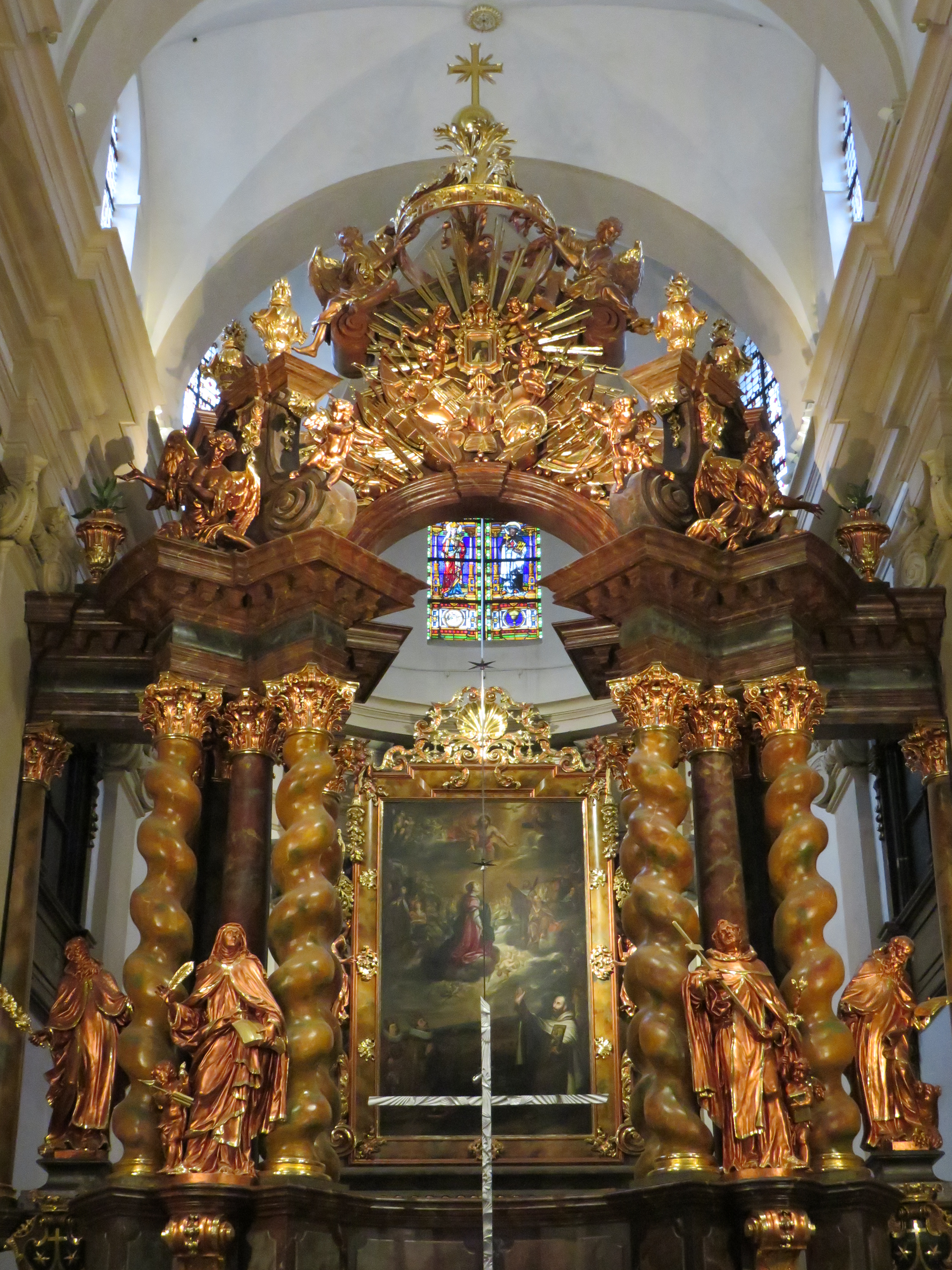
Chancel of the church

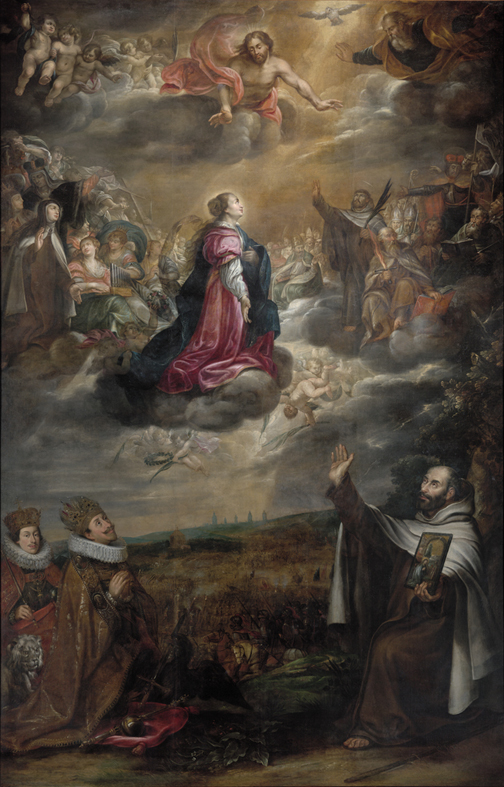
Painting celebrating the Catholic victory, by Anton Stevens (c. 1610–1675).

== Present day ==
The former monastery is now the office of the Ministry of Education, Youth, and Sports.

The church is part of the UNESCO World Heritage Site of Prague's Historic Center. It houses a museum related to the Infant of Prague.
