= Plateros, Zacatecas =

Town in Zacatecas, Mexico

Coordinates: 23.228°N 102.841°W

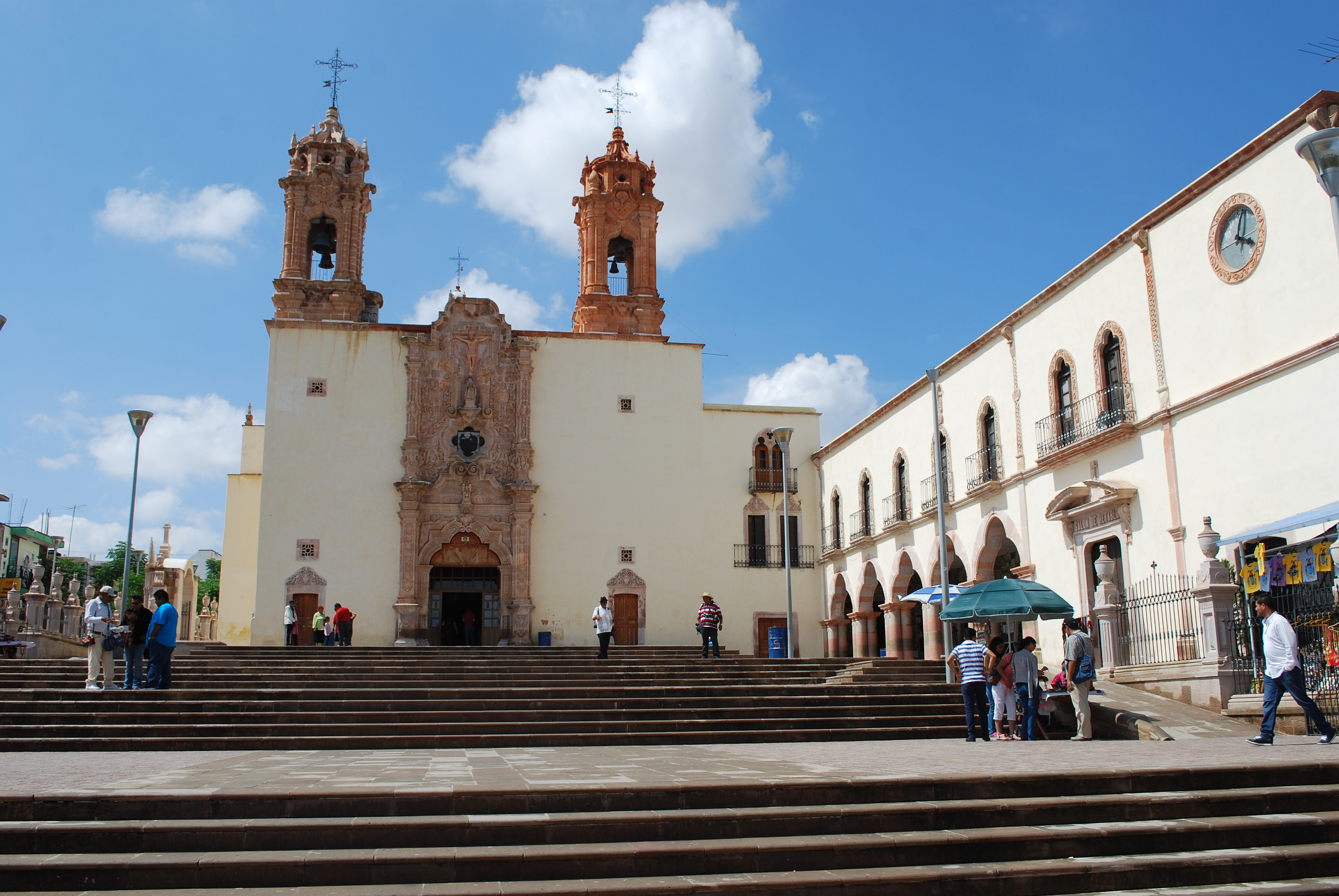
Sanctuary of the Niño de Atocha in Plateros

Plateros is a mining town in the state of Zacatecas, Mexico. It was founded as San Demetrio in 1566 and renamed by 1621. Located within the town is an important pilgrimage, the Sanctuary of Santo Niño de Atocha.

== History ==
The site of Plateros was inhabited as early as 1566 when some miners lost their way while trying to find the nearby mining town of Fresnillo. The miners found silver as they reconnoitered the area on Saint Dimitri's Day, and thus named the place San Demetrio. After 1621 the town was known as Plateros, the Spanish word for silver miners.

The first church built in Plateros included a crucifix called "El Señor de Plateros," which according to legend, conveyed spiritual healing powers. A second church founded in 1789 came with a gift from a local mining entrepreneur. He imported from Spain a statue of Nuestra Señora de Atocha, Maria de Atocha. Maria held a figurine of the baby Jesus, which was detachable and used alone as an attraction every Christmas Eve. Eventually the emphasis shifted from Maria de Atocha to the Niño de Atocha. In the nineteenth century interest in Santo Niño de Atocha spread through the mining region of Zacatecas. Later in the 1800s, the town imported a blue-clad version of the boy called "Niño Azul." This image was of boy around ten-years-old portrayed as performing two miracles. This new version of Santo Niño de Atocha appeared in popular reproductions of the image. By the early twentieth century, the Plateros Sanctuary's priests used this image to convert some Huichols to Christianity.

== Tourism ==
Religious tourism is now an essential industry in Plateros. The Sanctuary of Santo Niño de Atocha is the third most frequented religious site in Mexico. It draws 1.5 million visitors annually, behind the Basilica of Guadalupe in Mexico City and San Juan de los Lagos in the state of Jalisco. The mountain-dwelling Huichol people visit Plateros in order to sell their wares.
