= Bambino Gesù di Praga =

Sculpture of the Jesus child

Bambino Gesù di Praga via Arenzano
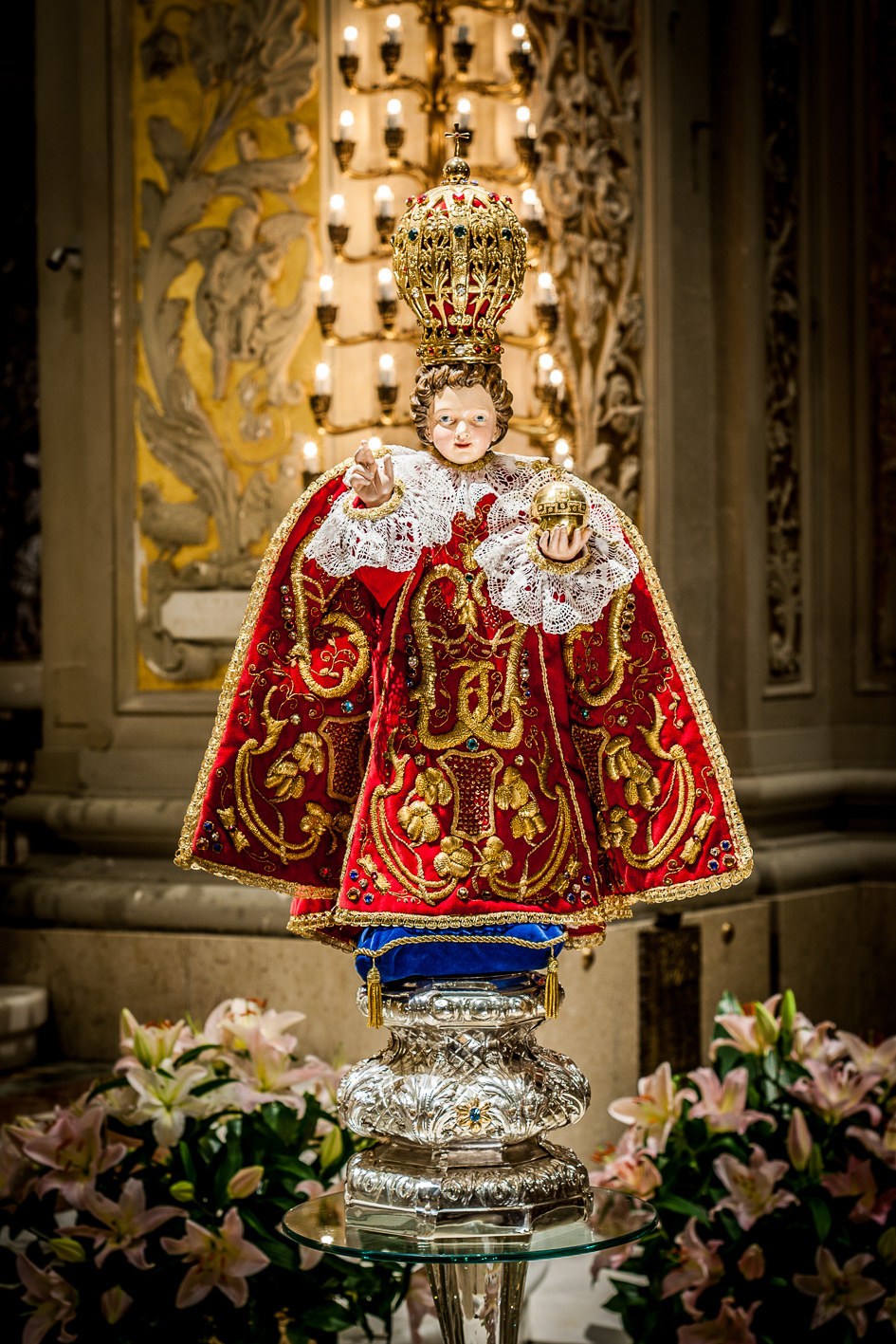
- The Bambino Gesù di Praga enshrined within the titular basilica
- Location: Arenzano, Liguria, Italy
- Date: 1902
- Witness: Marquise of Savona, Delfina Gavotti; Prior John of the Cross
- Type: Wooden image
- Approval: Pope Pius XI
- Shrine: The minor basilica of Bambino Gesù di Praga

The Bambino Gesù di Praga via Arenzano (lit. 'Child Jesus of Prague in Arenzano') is a Roman Catholic image of the Child Jesus venerated by the Genoese faithful.

The image takes its iconography from a painting of Infant Jesus of Prague which was brought by the Carmelite Order who wanted to propagate its devotion in the area. Italian Marchioness Delfina Gavotti of Savona used her personal funds to build a statuary image in 1902, which merited a Pontifical decree of coronation in 1924, partly due to her pious fanaticism to the Child Jesus under this title.

Various miraculous claims are associated with the image by its pilgrims, now preserved within the basilica. The image is celebrated with an annual religious feast on 1 September.

== History ==
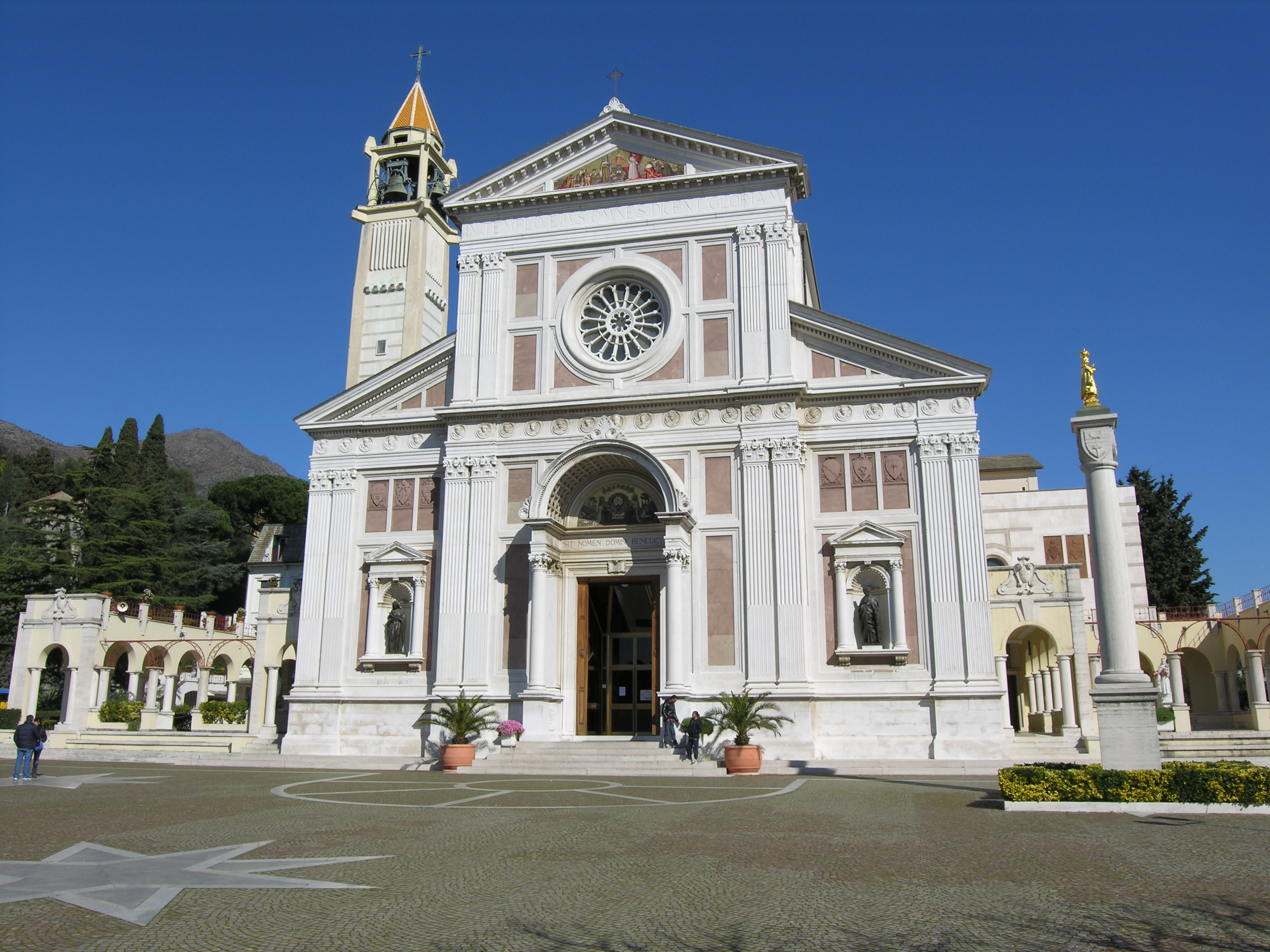
The minor basilica of Bambino Gesù di Praga, where the image is permanently enshrined and venerated

The image was donated by the Marquise Delfina Gavotti of Savona and was presented to the built shrine on 2 June 1902. It replaced a picture image of the Infant Jesus of Prague brought by the Carmelite Order on 25 September 1900, which was located beneath the statue of Our Lady of Mount Carmel.

The Marquise Delfina Gavotti of Savona was married to Marquis Girolamo of the prominent Gavotti clan. They had one son who died at stillbirth, Pietro Gavotti, which may have encouraged her fanatical devotion to the Child Jesus. The Marquise Delfina of Gavotti was also a prominent patroness of the Marian shrine of Santuario della Consolata, where she was listed in the shrine literature Missioni Consolata (the third consecutive year, issue #8) as a generous patroness of the parish building published in August 1901.

== Pontifical coronation ==
Pope Pius XI granted a decree of Canonical coronation to the venerated image on 24 February 1924 via his Papal legate Cardinal Rafael Merry del Val. The rite of coronation was executed on 6 September 1924 and was attended by many notable prelates, namely the young Catholic seminarian at the time, Giuseppe Siri and Queen Margherita of Savoy.

The same Pontiff raised the sanctuary to the status of a minor basilica on 6 May 1928 through the Pontifical Decree Pragensem Pueri Iesu signed and notarized by the Vatican Secretary of State Cardinal Pietro Gasparri, where the image is permanently enshrined today.

== See also ==
- Infant Jesus of Mechelen
- Santo Niño de Cebú
- List of canonically crowned images
- List of statues of Jesus
