= Santo Bambino of Aracoeli =

Catholic devotional image in Rome

Santo Bambino di Aracœli Holy Child of Aracœli
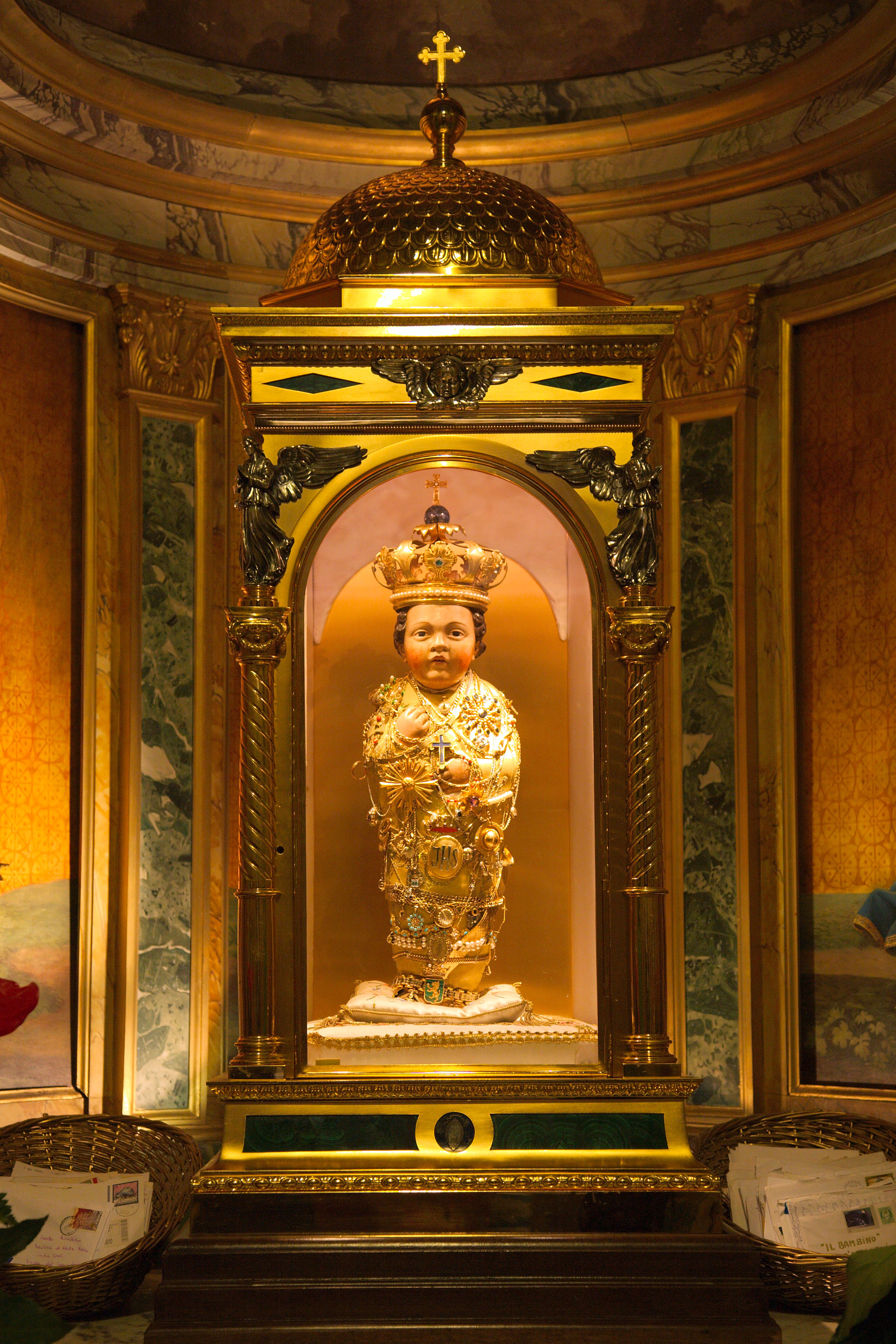
- The image enshrined within the Basilica.
- Location: Capitoline Hill
- Date: 15th century
- Witness: Franciscan friar Prince Alessandro Torlonia
- Type: Olive wood
- Approval: Pope Leo XIII; Pope John Paul II
- Shrine: Basilica of Santa Maria in Aracoeli

The Santo Bambino of Aracœli ("Holy Child of Aracœli"), sometimes known as the Bambino Gesù di Aracœli ("Child Jesus of Aracœli") is a 15th-century Roman Catholic devotional replicated wooden image enshrined in the titular Basilica of Santa Maria in Aracoeli, depicting the Christ Child swaddled in golden fabric, wearing a crown, and adorned with various gemstones and jewels donated by devotees.

On 18 January 1894, Pope Leo XIII authorised its public devotion and granted a canonical coronation on 2 May 1897. It was again blessed by Pope John Paul II on 8 January 1984. The image was purportedly stolen on 1 February 1994, and has now been replaced with a modern copy.

== History and devotions ==
The wooden image measures approximately 60 centimeters tall and depicts the Child Jesus as an infant. According to historical records preserved at the Basilica Santa Maria in Aracoeli, the image was carved from a single block of olive wood from the Garden of Gethsemane by a Franciscan friar assigned to the Holy Land in the fifteenth century.

Pilgrimages to the images are recorded as early as 1794. In February 1798, the image was seized by French troops but ransomed by Roman aristocrat Serafin Petraca, thus saving it from being burned. It remained in a convent in Trastevere for a little over a year while a new shrine was built. In 1838, thieves, ostensibly bending to kiss the image, made off with a considerable part of the jewelry with which he was adorned. During anti-Catholic protests in 1848, Carlo Armellini saved the Santo Bambino from arson.

=== Traditions ===
Romans have long associated the image with healing. According to one account, sometime in the 1800s a member of the noble Torlonia family became seriously ill and the friars were asked to bring the Santo Bambino to the sickbed. The friars obliged and the person recovered. Thereafter, Prince Alessandro Torlonia used a carriage that belonged to Pope Leo XIII to spend his Thursdays bringing the image on "house calls" to the sick unable to visit the Basilica. Until the beginning of the 20th century, a coach of Prince Torlonia was available day and night to bring the Santo Bambino to the bedside of a sick person.

An image of Santo Bambino known as the Bambinello is also venerated in the Church of San Giovanni, Cori, Lazio, where it is under secured custody of the Salviati and Borghese clan. Pious tradition in Cori maintains that in the 18th century, the Prefect of Pontifical Household, Cardinal Scipione Borghese (not the famous collector of the 17th century), Archbishop of Teodosia, gave the original Santo Bambino of Aracoeli to the Church of San Giovanni in Giulianello in an effort to prevent the image from being stolen or desecrated by left-wing Jacobin militants. If this is the case, then the image stolen from Aracoeli is an 18th-century replica, while the original from the 15th century remains at Cori.

A solar brooch depicting the allegorical image Sun of Justice was attached to the image, later stolen, and was associated with the Milanese jeweller Carlo Sartore. The Sun of Justice is depicted in older 19th-century lithographs of the image.

In 1927 the Legation Counsellor at the British Embassy was seriously ill with typhoid and was given last rites. Someone suggested sending for the Bambino. Philip Langdon went to Santa Maria in Araceoli, but on his return he and the accompanying Franciscan were stopped at the Piazza Venezia by a cordon of soldiers who had blocked off the street while the Duce made a speech. Despite being in a car with a cardinal's coat of arms they were not allowed to pass, until Langdon told them that he was bringing the Bambino to a dying man - at which point the soldiers snapped to attention and flagged them through.

Today, the chapel at Aracoeli is filled with letters from all over the world, some of them addressed only to "Il Bambino, Rome". To make room for new letters, several weeks' worth of old ones are removed and burned with some incense. These are left unopened because, as a Franciscan custodian of the image puts it, "What is in the letters, is a matter between the Bambino and the letter writer and does not concern us."

At Christmas, the Bambino is customarily placed in the crèche at the Basilica. Another custom is, in the period between Christmas and Epiphany, to have children of six to ten years of age stand on a specially built platform to speak to the Bambino. This has fallen out of practice, having been replaced by the mainstream religious procession.

== Pontifical recognitions ==
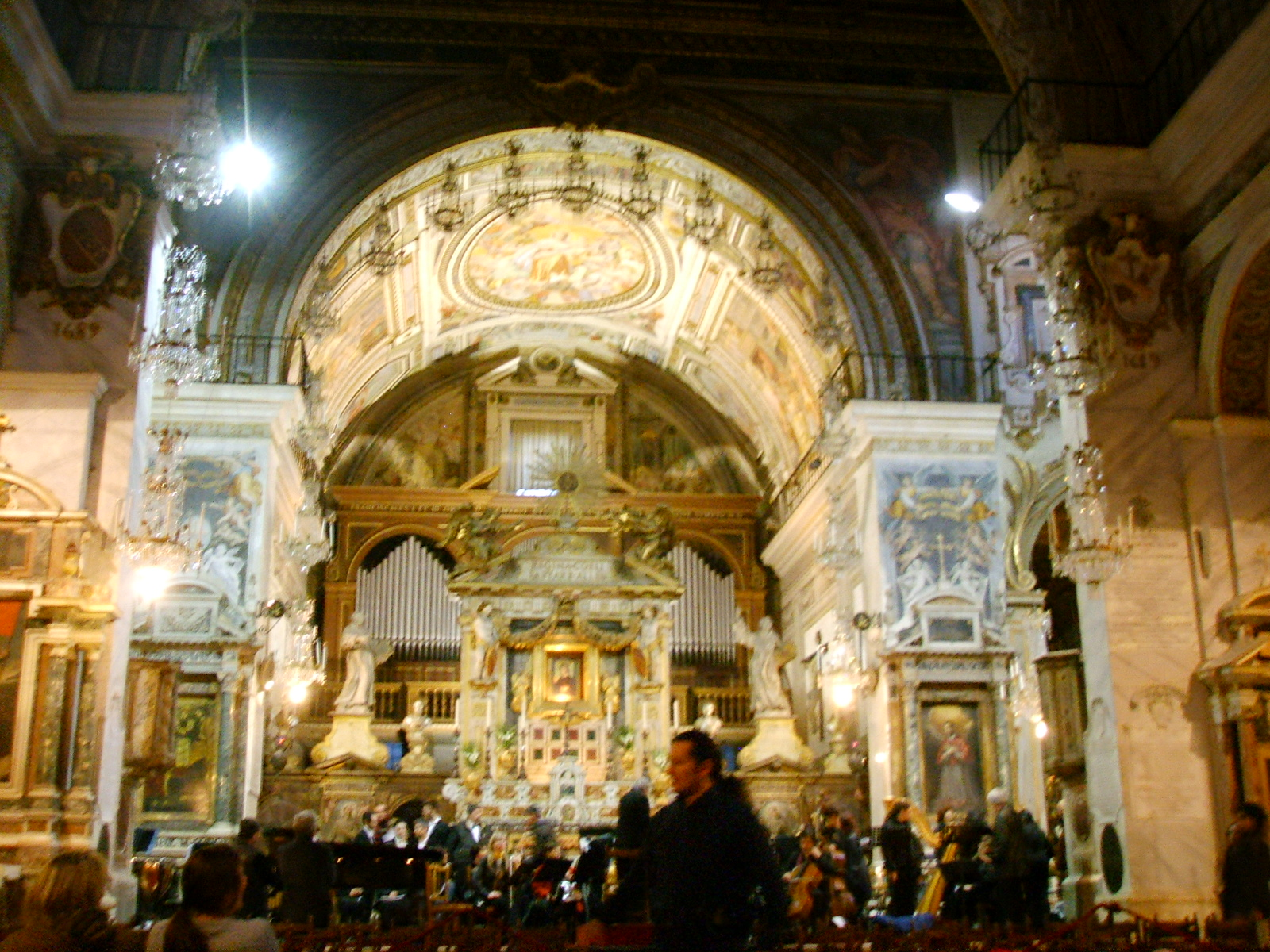
The high altar of Basilica of Santa Maria in Aracoeli

- On 18 January 1894, Pope Leo XIII authorised the devotion to the image, along with a rescript and prayer dedicated to the infancy of Jesus. On 2 May 1897, Leo XIII issued a canonical coronation towards the image through the Vatican Chapter.
- The image was also mentioned in a 1969 letter to the College of Cardinals given by Pope Paul VI for the 1969 World Day of Peace on New Year's Day.
- On 8 January 1984, Pope John Paul II issued a homily blessing the title and its image at the Pope Paul VI Audience Hall on the solemn occasion of Jubilee year for children.

== Theft of the image ==
The statue itself was adorned with valuable ex-votos. It was customarily stored at night in a secured cabinet, but on 1 February 1994 at approximately 4:00 PM, two thieves masqueraded as workers on a scaffold erected in the monastery for renovations. By one account, the thieves ransacked the friars' rooms looking for valuables, and coming to the room where the image was stored at night, found the armored cabinet open. Another version says the statue was still on display in the Basilica's crèche, which was to be removed the next day.

While the police believed it would be difficult to recover any of the gold and valuables taken with the image, they considered the Santo Bambino too well known to be easily marketed. The theft of the Santo Bambino caused considerable outrage in Rome. A number of rich individuals offered to underwrite a ransom, but the Franciscans discouraged that approach and proceeded to have a copy made. The inmates at the Regina Coeli prison even wrote a petition to their anonymous "colleagues", asking for its return. That having failed, they donated money for the new copy.

== Legends ==
Pious tradition holds that when the friar did not have the paints necessary to finish his work, it was completed by an angel. Upon his return to Italy, the ship was wrecked during a storm. The friar survived and later found the statue washed up on the shore at Livorno.

A second tale recounts that in 1797, the Princess Pauline Bonaparte wishing to have the statue for herself, had a copy made. When her cousin became gravely ill, the family requested that the Bambino be brought, but returned the copy. However, at midnight while the bells rang at Santa Maria in Araceoli, the statue miraculously returned to its rightful place, thus inspiring the famous urban legend of a Roman noblewoman pretending to be sick with the ulterior motive to take the image to her home.

According to tradition, the lips of the Holy Child turn red when a request is going to be granted, and white when the cause presented is hopeless.

== See also ==
- Infant Jesus of Prague
- Infant Jesus of Mechelen
- Santo Niño de Cebu
- List of statues of Jesus
