= Infant Jesus of Prague =

16th-century statue of the Child Jesus

Coordinates: 50°05′08″N 14°24′12″E

Infant Jesus of Prague Gratiosus Jesulus Pragensis Pražské Jezulátko, Santo Niño de Praga, Divino Menino Jesus, Prager Jesulein
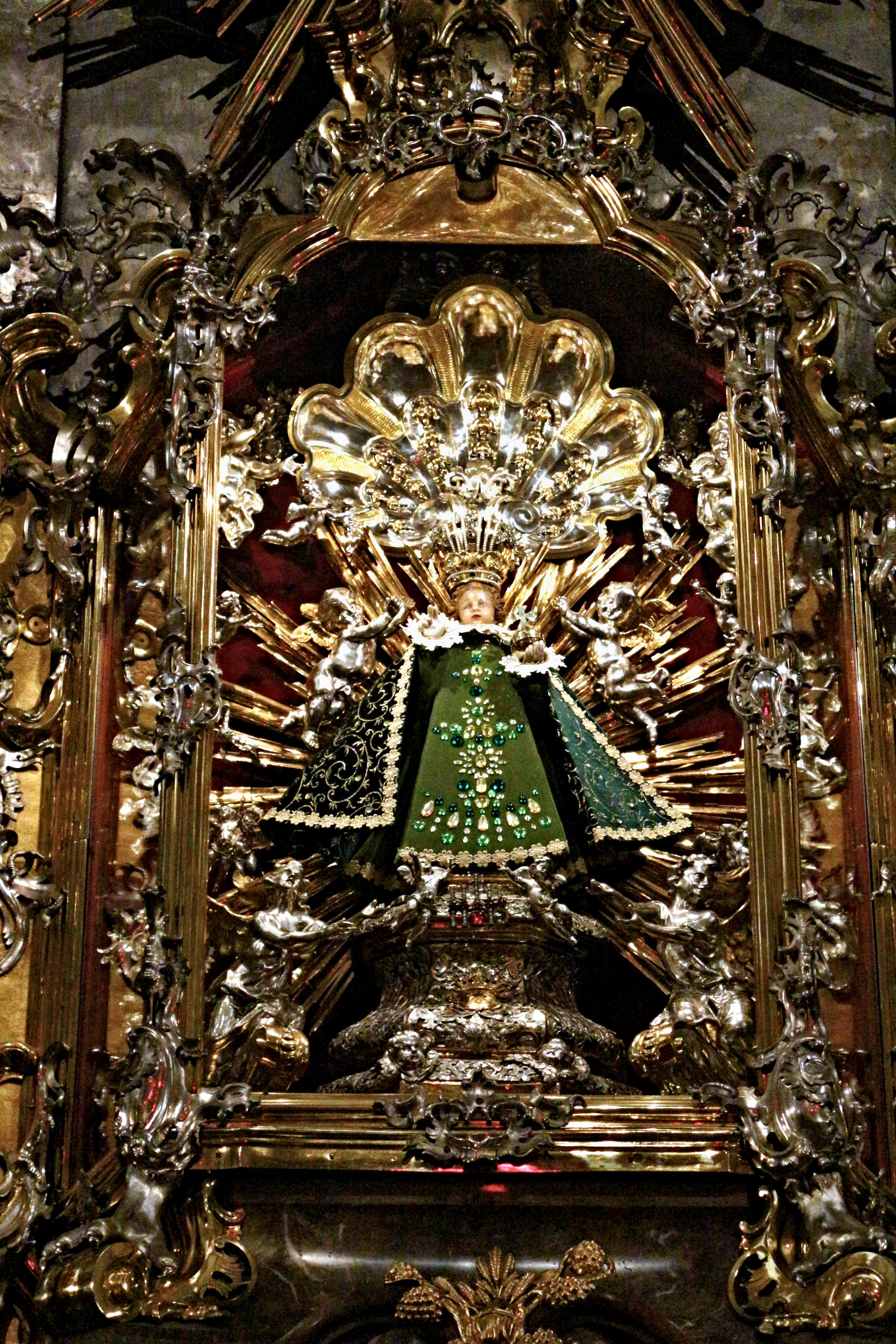
- Infant Jesus wearing his ordinary green vestment along with his present canonical crown
- Location: Prague, Czech Republic
- Date: 1556
- Witness: Teresa of Ávila; María Manrique de Lara y Mendoza; Princess Polyxena of Lobkowicz
- Type: Wax coated wooden statue with wooden base and silver erector
- Approval: Pope Leo XII; Pope Pius X Pope Pius XI; Pope Benedict XVI
- Shrine: Church of Our Lady of Victories

The Infant Jesus of Prague (Czech: Pražské Jezulátko: Spanish: Niño Jesús de Praga) is a 16th-century wax-coated wooden statue of the Child Jesus holding a globus cruciger of Spanish origin, now located in the Discalced Carmelite Church of Our Lady of Victories in Malá Strana, Prague, Czech Republic. First appearing in 1556, pious legends claim that the statue once belonged to Teresa of Ávila and was consequently donated to the Carmelite friars by Princess Polyxena of Lobkowicz in 1628.

The divine image is routinely clothed by the Carmelite nuns in luxurious fabrics with imperial regalia and a golden crown while his left hand holds a globus cruciger and the right hand is raised in a gesture of benediction. It is venerated on Christmas and the first Sunday of May commemorating both its centenary and "episcopal coronation" in 1655.

== History ==
The exact origin of the Infant Jesus statue is not known, but historical sources point to a 19‑inch (48 cm) sculpture of the Holy Child with a bird in his right hand currently located in the Cistercian monastery of Santa María de la Valbonna in Asturias, Spain, which was carved around the year 1340. Many other Infant Jesus sculptures were also carved by famous masters throughout Europe in the Middle Ages. Often found in early medieval work, the significance of the bird symbolizes either a soul or the Holy Spirit. The sculptures of the Holy Child were dressed in imperial regalia reflecting the aristocratic fashion of that period.

One legend says that a monk in a desolated monastery somewhere between Córdoba and Seville had a vision of a little boy telling him to pray. The monk spent several hours praying, and then he made a figure of the child.

The House of Habsburg began ruling the Kingdom of Bohemia in 1526; the kingdom developed close ties with Spain. The statue first appeared in 1556, when María Maximiliana Manriquez de Lara y Mendoza brought the image to Bohemia upon her marriage to Czech nobleman Vratislav II of Pernštejn. An old legend in the Lobkowicz family reports that María's mother, Doña Isabella, had been given the statue by Teresa of Ávila herself. María received the family heirloom as a wedding present. In 1587, she gave it to her daughter, Polyxena of Lobkowicz as a wedding present.

In 1628, Princess Polyxena von Lobkowicz donated the statue to the impoverished Discalced Carmelite friars (White Friars). Upon presenting it, the Princess Polyxena is reported to have said: "Venerable Fathers, I bring you my dearest possession. Honour this image and you shall never be poor.”

The statue was placed in the oratory of the monastery of Our Lady of Victory, Prague, where special devotions to Jesus were offered before it twice a day. The Carmelite novices professed their vow of poverty in the presence of the Divine Infant. Upon hearing of the Carmelites' devotions and needs, the Emperor Ferdinand II of the House of Habsburg sent along 2,000 florins and a monthly stipend for their support.

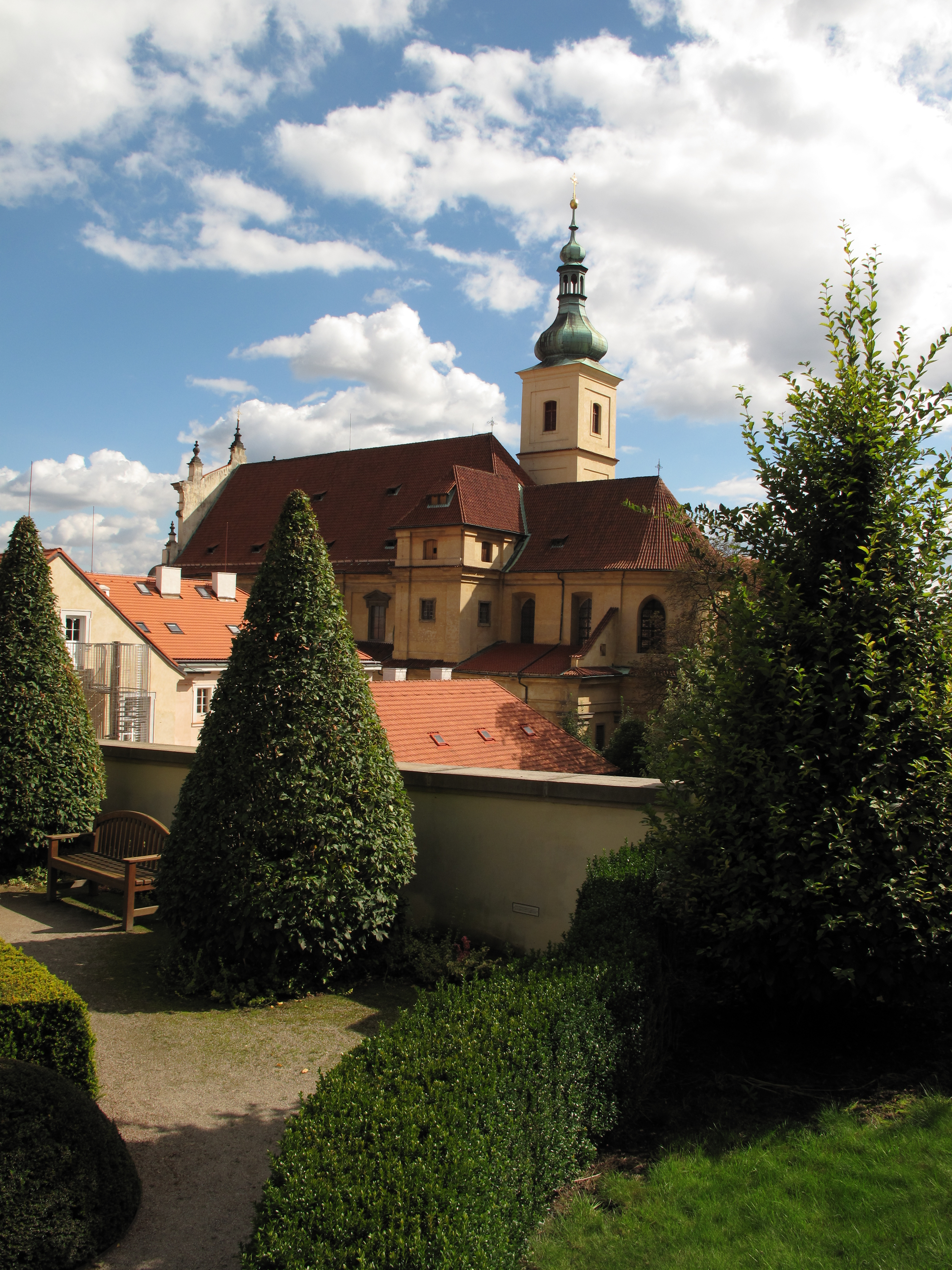
The Church of Our Lady Victorious, in Malá Strana, Prague, Czech Republic

In 1630, the Carmelite novitiate was transferred to Munich. Disturbances in Bohemia due to the Thirty Years' War brought an end to the special devotions, and on 15 November 1631 the army of King Gustavus Adolphus of Sweden took possession of Bohemia's capital city. The Carmelite friary was plundered and the image of the Infant of Prague was thrown into a pile of rubbish behind the altar. Here it lay forgotten for seven years, its hands broken off, until in 1637 it was found again by Father Cyrillus and placed in the church's oratory. One day, while praying before the statue, Cyrillus claimed to have heard a voice say, "Have pity on me, and I will have pity on you. Give me my hands, and I will give you peace. The more you honour me, the more I will bless you."

Since then, the statue has remained in Prague and has drawn many devotees worldwide to honour the Holy Child. Claims of blessings, favours and miraculous healings have been made by many who petitioned before the Infant Jesus.

In 1739, the Carmelites of the Austrian Province formed a special devotion apart from their regular apostolate. In 1741, the statue was moved to the epistle side of the Church of Our Lady of Victories in Prague.

Copies of the Infant Jesus arrived in Poland in 1680, and it has been popular in Polish homes, and Bohemia in general, where the copies are typically placed in glass-enclosed gables. After the start of the Counter-Reformation era of the 17th century, the statue spread among the Christian communities of South Africa, Australia, Caribbean, Thailand and Sri Lanka.

== Description ==
The statue is a 19‑inch (48 cm) representation of the Infant Jesus, carved out of wood, which is covered with linen, and the surface modeled in coloured wax. The surface of the wax is quite fragile. In order to protect the fragile wax surface, the bottom half below the waist is enclosed in a silver case.

Since 1788, the statue's raised two fingers have worn two rings, as a thanksgiving gift by a noble Czech family for healing their daughter. Some earlier records indicate that the original wig was possibly white.

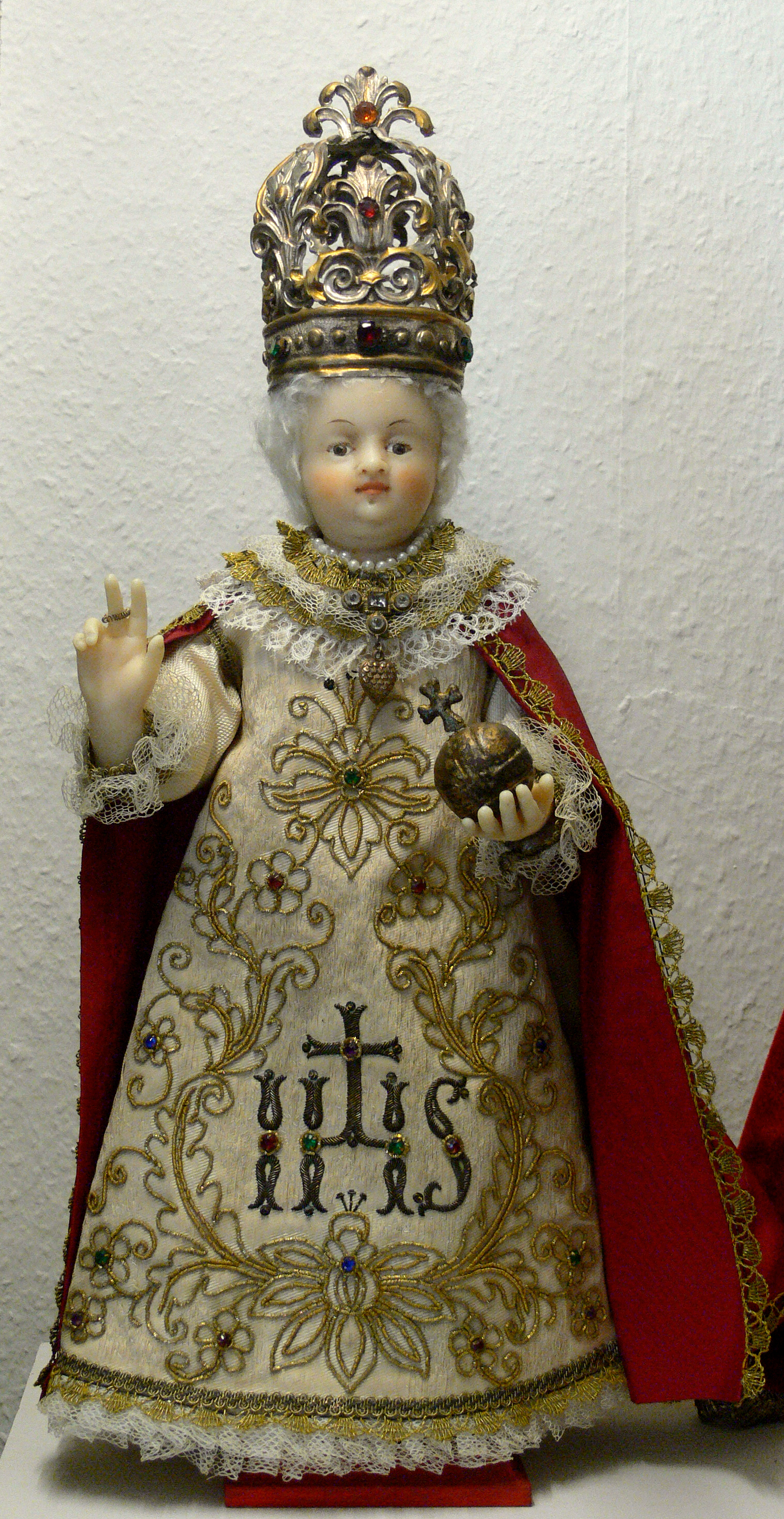
A German copy of the statue, with a white wig instead of the traditional blonde or reddish-brown hair, circa 1870

=== Vestments ===
Several costly embroidered vestments have been donated by benefactors. Among those donated are those from Empress Maria Theresa and Emperor Ferdinand I of Austria, which are preserved to this day. A notable garment in the collection is an ermine cloak placed on the statue the first Sunday after Easter, which is the anniversary day of the coronation of the statue by the Archbishop of Prague Ernst Adalbert von Harrach on 4 April 1655. In 1713 the clothing began to be changed according to the liturgical norms. Other valuable garments worn by the image are vestments studded with various gemstones, embroidered with gold, and silk fabrics as well as handmade lace customised purposely for the statue.

- Green – Ordinary Time
- Purple – Lent, Candlemas and Advent
- Red or gold – Christmas and Easter
- Royal blue – Immaculate Conception / Feast of Assumption.

The divine image ordinarily follows the liturgical colors used by Catholic priests, as a representation of its priesthood.

== Devotion ==
Prague is one of the major pilgrimage centers in Central Europe, with the Prague church housing the Infant Jesus statue offering regular Mass in Czech, Spanish, Italian, English and German languages. The Feast of the Infant Jesus of Prague celebrates the mystery of the Incarnation, and is observed on 14 January.

Each year on the first Sunday of May, a coronation feast and 45-minute public procession with a copy of the statue takes place amid a sea of devotees and tourists. The first procession, initiated by the counts of Martinice, took place in 1651; the statue of the Infant Jesus travelled from one Prague church to another. The newest crown was donated by Pope Benedict XVI during his visit to Prague in 2009.

The 1984 miniseries Teresa de Jesús shows Teresa of Ávila with a statue in a number of scenes. As novice mistress, Therese of the Child Jesus placed the statue in the novitiate at Lisieux, because she knew the many blessings the Divine Child brought to the Carmelite novices in Prague when it was placed in their midst.

Statuettes of the Infant Jesus are placed inside many Catholic churches, sometimes with the quotation, "The more you honour me, the more I will bless you."

In Ireland, the statue is popular and is called "Child of Prague". A wedding gift of a statue of the Child of Prague is particularly auspicious. Irish brides hoping for good luck and good weather on the wedding day ritually place a copy of the statue outside their homes. Devotion to the Child of Prague and belief in its power to influence the weather is still strong in many parts of Ireland. It is also common to see the Child of Prague displayed in the window of houses in some of the older parts of Dublin and in many towns across the country. The practice of putting it out in the hedge or burying it in the garden as a solicitation for good weather is widespread across Ireland.

Statues of the Infant of Prague have been consecrated in churches of the U.S. states of Oklahoma, Connecticut and Michigan.

=== Rituals ===
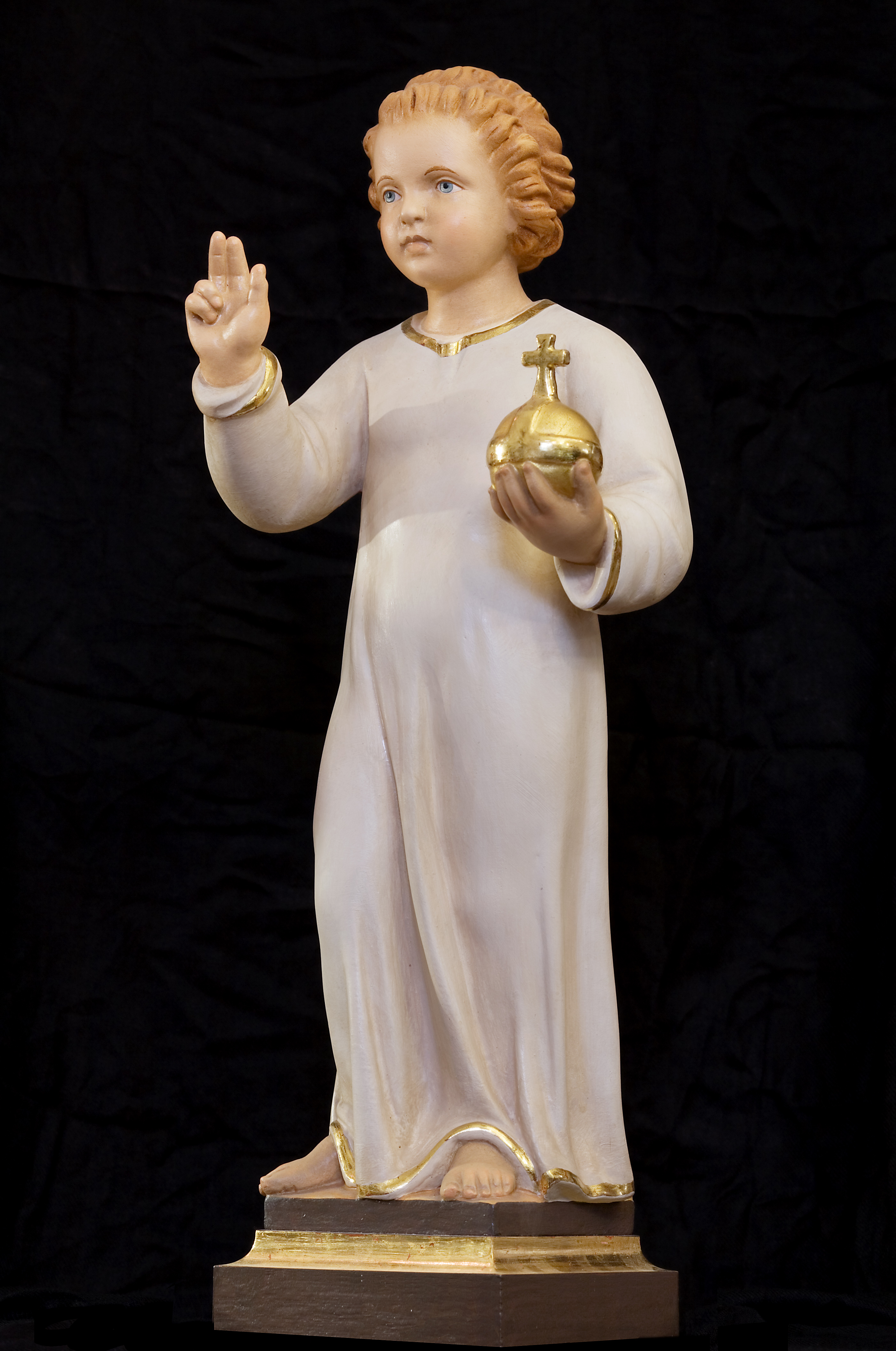
The vicariate replica copy of the Infant Jesus of Prague in its bare format

Copies of the Infant of Prague statue are venerated in many countries of the Catholic world. In the church where the original is housed, it is ritually cared for, cleaned and dressed by the Carmelite sisters of the church, who change the Infant Jesus' clothing to one of the approximately one hundred costumes donated by the faithful as gifts of devotion. The statue has had a dedicated robe for each part of the ecclesiastical calendar. The statue is venerated, with the faithful believing that Jesus has powers to give favours to those who pray to the Infant of Prague. Copies of the statue are also venerated by Spanish-speaking Catholic faithful around the world.

Once every four years, two wooden statues of Infant Jesus made in Prague are sent to various Catholic churches of the world. The Prague church also has a dedicated service that every week ships copies of the statue, cards, religious souvenirs and other items globally to Catholic devotees.

Churches modelled on the Prague church have been founded elsewhere, such as in the United States and Africa, where the devotees sing, dance, preach and shout. The devotional worship of Infant Jesus of Prague is not limited to Prague, and during the 18th century it expanded to churches in Central Europe. In the late 19th and early 20th centuries, as plaster and metal moulding became more affordable, the statues of the Infant of Prague spread rapidly into the homes of modern Europe.

A chaplet ritual uses a ring of twelve with three additional prayer beads.

== Pontifical approbations ==
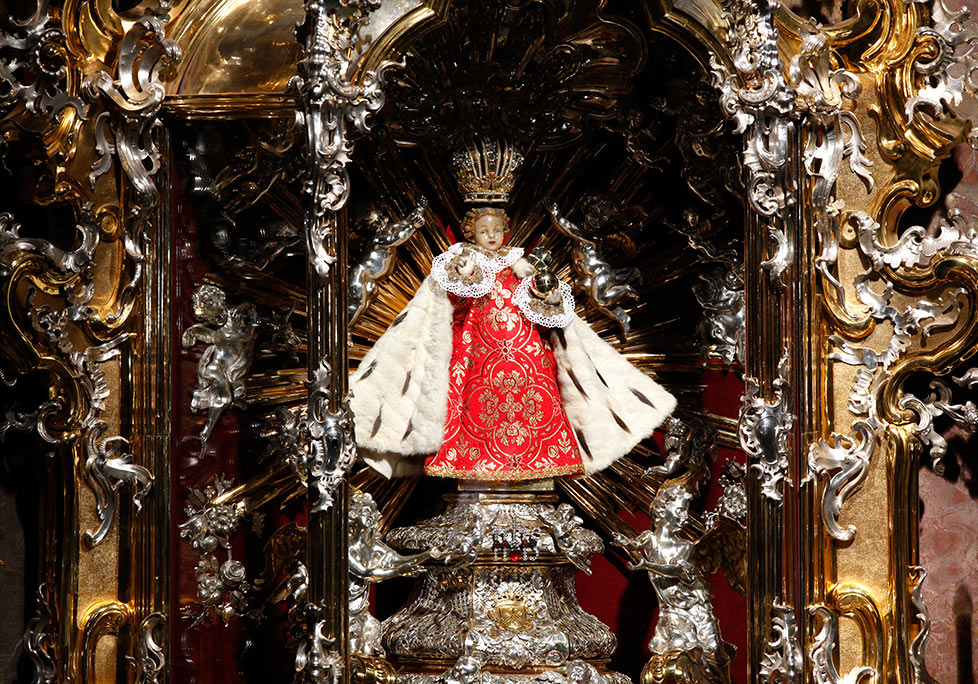
The Holy Statue wearing its former canonical crown, now stored within the museum treasury of the church

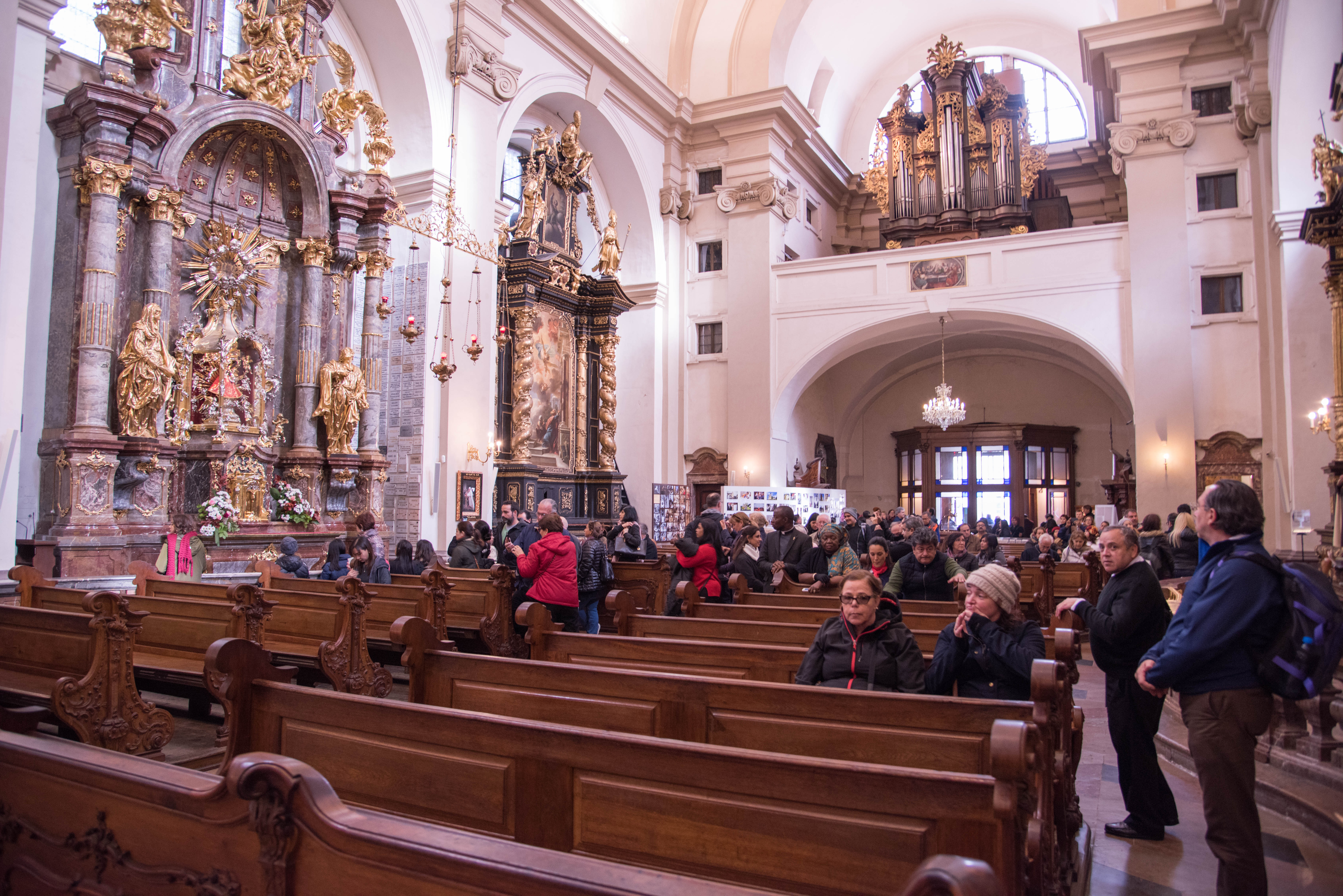
Pilgrims inside the church

- Pope Leo XIII — granted a decree of pontifical coronation on 24 September 1824, notarized by the Camerlengo of the Holy Roman Church, Cardinal Pietro Francesco Galleffi on behalf of the Patriarchal Council of the “Vatican Chapter” thus being the first Christological image to be granted a prestigious honor.
- Pope Pius X — granted authorization via the decree Significat Nobis on 30 March 1913 to erect a namesake confraternity for the Order of Discalced Carmelites based on former regulations promulgated by Pope Clement VIII, which was signed and notarized by Cardinal Rafael Merry del Val. The Archconfraternity of the Holy Infancy, founded in 1636 in Beaune, France is a similar devotion akin to the Child Jesus, but not exactly the same.
- Pope Pius XI reiterated privileges to this sodality for the Order of Discalced Carmelites in Prague via the decree Per Similes Literras on 25 January 1923.
- Pope Benedict XVI — during an apostolic visit to the Czech Republic in September 2009, visited the Church of Our Lady Victorious in Prague and donated a golden crown with eight shells with numerous pearls and garnets, which is at present worn by the statue. Since that year, the 1924 "cushion crown" of the image is now permanently kept in the Carmelite museum on display behind the church while the garnet crown donated by Benedict is the one that is permanently worn by the statue.

== Child Jesus statues venerated in other countries ==
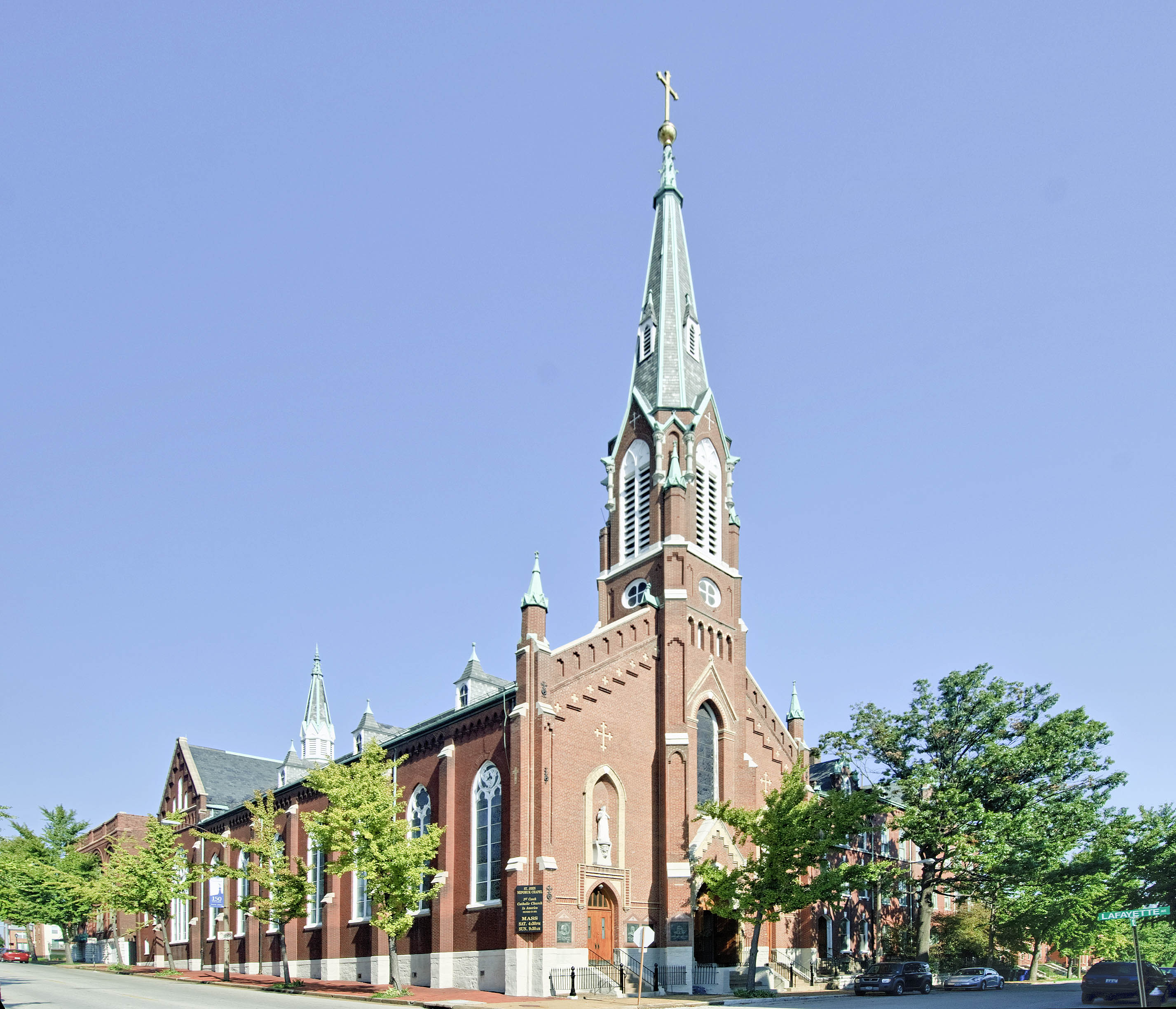
The American parish of Saint John Nepomuk in Missouri enshrines an image of the Prague Jesus crowned by diocesan honor on 4 January 1948.

- Since 1200, pious legends and religious devotion within the Iberian peninsula, among communities of Portugal and Spain, the Santo Niño de Atocha carrying a basket spans various miraculous legends. The legend was also carried over to Mexico where similar Christian mythologies were later re-created.
- Since 1499, in Rome, Italy, another statue similar to it is called Santo Bambino (literally, "Holy Child") and ritually revered especially during the Christmas season such as at the Basilica of Santa Maria in Ara Coeli in Rome. Pope Leo XIII granted the image a pontifical decree of coronation in 1897.
- Since 1521, the Santo Niño de Cebú has been venerated in Cebu, Philippines, when brought there by conquistador Ferdinand Magellan. The image is currently housed in its basilica built in 1739, and an annual novena was introduced in 1889 attracts over a million pilgrims each January. Pope Paul VI granted the image a pontifical decree of coronation in 1965.
- Since 1536, originally from Belgium, the expressions, accessories and hand posture of Santo Niño de Cebú are similar to the Infant Jesus of Mechelen, and it is believed that both statues originated from the same European source in Belgium, with devotion to the Philippine image started earlier of the two.
- Since 1897, in Missouri, United States, a statue of the image enshrined at the Saint John Nepomuk oldest Czech parish in United States was given a diocesan coronation on 4 January 1948 by its parish priest, Father Albert Prokes. The venerated image dates back from 1897, brought to America by Monsignor Joseph Hessoun (1853–1903) from his native Czechoslovakia. Pious believers donated their personal jewelry to the image, executed into a crown, pendant and ornaments by local jeweler Edgar Schmidt.
- Since 1902, the Bambino Gesu of Arenzano in the Basilica of Arenzano is an image copy brought over by Italian Marquess Delphina Gavotti of Savona. A former painting copy of the image was initially brought over by the Carmelite friars. Pope Pius XI granted a decree of pontifical coronation on 24 February 1924 and was crowned by Cardinal Rafael Merry del Val on 6 September 1924.
- Since May 1971, in Bangalore, India, a statue of the infant Jesus has been enshrined at Infant Jesus Church in Viveknagar. The former Archbishop of Bangalore, Alphonsus Mathias formally blessed the image in 1989 by popular demand.
- The image has also worked its way into the Afro-Hispanic religions of Santería and the closely related Santerismo, where Catholic images often represent African-based spiritual beings called Orishas. The Infant of Prague is one of several Catholic images that can be used to stand in for Elegua, the Orisha of Roads. Believers can give offerings to the statue such as any food except pigeon, with his favorites being goat, rooster, bush rat, and smoked fish.

== See also ==
- List of canonically crowned images
- List of statues of Jesus
- Infant Jesus of Mechelen
- Santo Niño de Cebú
- Divino Niño
- Holy Infant of Good Health
- Lobkowicz family
- Christ Child
