= Holy Infant of Atocha =

Roman Catholic image of the Christ Child

Coordinates: 23°13′34″N 102°50′28″W

Holy Infant of Atocha Santo Niño de Atocha
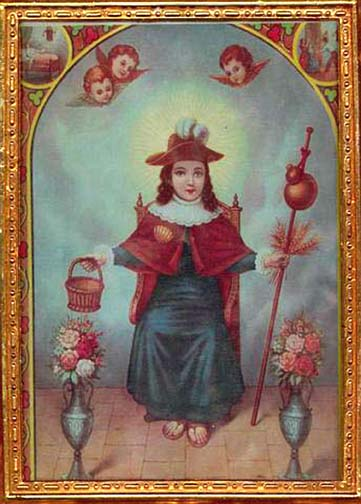
- Traditional portrayal of Santo Niño de Atocha
- Location: Atocha, Spain
- Date: 13th century
- Patronage: Spain, Mexico, travelers, protection from danger, those unjustly imprisoned
- Attributes: Brown cloak, blue robe, feathered hat, basket, staff, water gourde, vase with flowers at feet

Holy Infant of Atocha, Santo Niño de Atocha, Holy Child of Atocha, Saint Child of Atocha, or Wise Child of Atocha is a Roman Catholic image of the Christ Child popular among the Hispanic cultures of Spain, Latin America and the southwestern United States. It is distinctly characterized by a basket of bread he carries, along with a staff, and a drinking gourd. He served the gourd and basket of bread to the prisoners that he encountered during his travels. He wore a cape to which is affixed a scallop shell – a symbol of a pilgrimage to Saint James.

== History ==
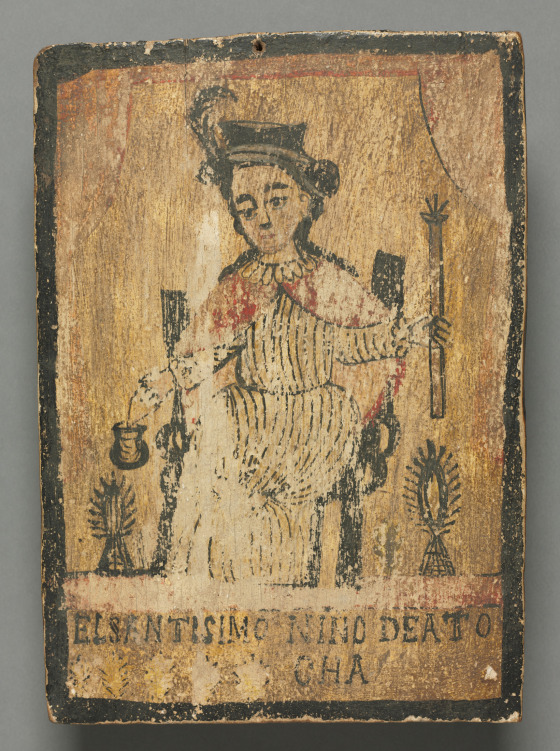
A panel painting of the Holy Infant. The piece is dated back to the 17th century.

Devotion to Holy Infant of Atocha originally began as a Marian devotion with a medieval statue of the Madonna and Child in Toledo, Spain. According to Juan Javier Pescador, it originally reflected devotions to three different depictions of the Virgin Mary: Our Lady of Atocha, Our Lady of Antigua, and Our Lady of Pregnancies that later coalesced into Our Lady of Atocha.

The image of the Divine Child was portable, and devout families would often borrow the image of the infant when a woman was about to give birth to her child.

In the 13th century, much of Spain was under Muslim rule. The town of Atocha, now part of Madrid's Arganzuela district, was lost to the Muslims, and many Christians there were taken prisoners as spoils of war. The Christian prisoners were not fed by the jailers, but by family members who brought them food. According to pious legend, the caliph ordered that only children under the age of 12 were permitted to bring food. Conditions became increasingly difficult for those men without small children. The women of Atocha prayed before the statue of Our Lady of Atocha at a nearby parish, a title of the Blessed Virgin Mary, to ask her son Jesus for help.

Reports soon began among the people of Atocha that an unknown child under the age of twelve and dressed in pilgrim's clothing had begun to bring food to childless prisoners at night. The women of the town returned to Our Lady of Atocha to thank the Virgin for her intercession and noticed that the shoes worn by the Infant Jesus were tattered and dusty. They replaced the shoes of the Infant Jesus, but these became worn again. The people of Atocha took this as a sign that it was the Infant Jesus who went out every night to help those in need.

== Description ==
The Holy Child of Atocha is depicted dressed as a boy pilgrim dressed in a brown cloak with a white lace collar over a blue robe. He wears a brimmed hat with a plume and carries a basket full of bread in one hand and a pilgrim's staff in the other. The pilgrim's staff is often depicted with a water gourd fastened to it. On the cloak he wears a Shell of Saint James, the symbol of the pilgrims to the Shrine of Santiago de Compostela in northwestern Spain. The Child is said to roam the hills and valleys, particularly at night, bringing aid and comfort to the needy, and thereby wearing out his shoes. He is usually shown seated.

== Devotion beyond Atocha ==
The Moorish conflict extended well beyond the town of Atocha. During dire points in their journey, travelers reported that a young boy, dressed as a pilgrim, would come to them bringing food and other necessities. The boy would often travel with them until they were out of danger and then guide them to the safest roads to reach their destination. Pious legends continued to be developed and the miraculous Child later became considered to be the Child Jesus and was given the title the Holy Child of Atocha.

=== North America ===
There is a shrine run by the Poor Clares, dedicated to Niño de Atocha at Plateros, near the city of Fresnillo, in the state of Zacatecas, Mexico. In 1554, the original Mexican Niño de Atocha was brought from Atocha to Zacatecas, and installed in the church of Saint Augustine not long after a silver strike in Plateros.

In those years silver was discovered in Fresnillo and mines were being opened in the mountains near the settlement. Within a few weeks of the opening of the mine of Fresnillo, there was an explosion and many miners were trapped. The wives of the miners went to the church of St. Augustine to pray for their husbands and noticed that the child on the image of Our Lady of Atocha was missing. At the same time, it was said that a child came to the trapped miners, gave them water and showed them the way out of the mine. Whenever there was a problem at the mine the child helped the miners in need. Each time this happened, the image of the child on the Virgin's arms was found to be dirty and his clothes had little holes in them. After that, the Holy Child was taken off his mother's arms and put on a glass box for everyone to see. The Holy Child of Atocha has become a symbol of Zacatecas and the protector of miners. Many make pilgrimages to Plateros at Christmas to bring toys to the Holy Child.

A number of religious sites in New Mexico US are devoted to the Santo Niño. A shrine is located in and at Chimayo, New Mexico, US. Founded in 1911, a small church called "Santo Niño del Antocha" is located at the foot of the Sierra Blanca Mountain Range near the Three Rivers Petroglyph Site with an outdoor trail for the Stations of the Cross leading up to a cross on a nearby peak.

In 1998, an outdoor shrine to El Niño de Atocha was established at La Iglesia de Nuestra Señora la Reina de los Ángeles in downtown Los Angeles, California.

=== The Philippines ===
The Holy Infant of Atocha is also popular among the Filipino Catholics. The local variant, simply known as Santo Niño de Palaboy (Holy Child, the Wandering Beggar), is portrayed very similarly to the Spanish Atocha, except that it is always standing rather than sitting. He bears a staff with an attached bag or basket, which is usually filled with coins or candy, and he dons a pilgrim hat resembling the Atocha image. Similar to the devotion to the Holy Child of Atocha, the devotion to the Santo Niño de Palaboy is considered a folk devotion to the Baby Jesus that is also incorporated with the other more established devotions to the Christ Child in the Philippines, such as the devotions in Cebú and Tondo. Like in the case of the Atocha devotion, there is a folk belief that the Santo Niño wanders about the streets just like every other Palaboy.

The current Santo Niño found in many Filipino homes is traditionally dressed in either green or red garments. In Filipino folk Catholicism, red garments are suited for images enshrined at home, while green ones are for those enshrined in business establishments; a common offering to the latter is a bowl filled with coins and sweets. In addition, many Filipinos customarily dress the Santo Niño in modern attire that reflects their professional roles, such as nurses, doctors, janitors, teachers, and policemen, as a means of asking for his patronage. These customs relating to dress are also applied to replicas of the Santo Niño de Cebu, brought by Ferdinand Magellan to the islands in 1521, and the Infant Jesus of Prague.

In recent years, the Catholic Church in the Philippines has suppressed the usage of green colored garments for images of the Santo Niño because doing so would imply that the Child Jesus is no longer viewed as God but rather as a "good luck charm" and is against the very identity of Jesus as revealed in the Scripture. Along with this move from the Church also came the discouragement of the usage and veneration of other controversial images of the Baby Jesus. The Palaboy depiction is also discouraged in some churches in the Philippines and there is currently an ongoing debate as to whether or not the depiction of Jesus as a "Palaboy" or Beggar is acceptable in the Catholic Church.

== Pop culture and other references ==
In the film Napoleon Dynamite, Pedro suggests placing santos around the hallways of his high school, recommending El Santo Niño de Atocha. He says that his Aunt Concha has seen him.

Holy Infant of Atocha is sometimes associated with the Yoruba orisha Eshu, or Elegua.

This holy infant appears in the 1991 novel Mojo and the Pickle Jar, by Douglas Bell.

In Michael Jackson's video for "Beat It", there is a picture of the Santo Niño above his bed.

On the television sitcom George Lopez, the Holy Infant of Atocha is displayed in the family's kitchen.

The Colombian television historical drama Escobar, el Patrón del Mal features references to the Holy Infant of Atocha. The saint is a particular favorite of Pablo Escobar's mother, Emilia Hermilda Gaviria. She displays a very large portrait of the saint (same as the image above) in her foyer and invokes him in verbal blessings upon her loved ones.

In season 3 episode 17 of The Last Man on Earth, Todd says a prayer to El Santo Niño de Atocha while delivering Erica’s baby.

== See also ==
- Infant Jesus of Prague
- Divine Infant Jesus
- Infancy Gospels
- Holy Infant of Good Health
