= Christ Child =

Depiction of Jesus up to the age of 12

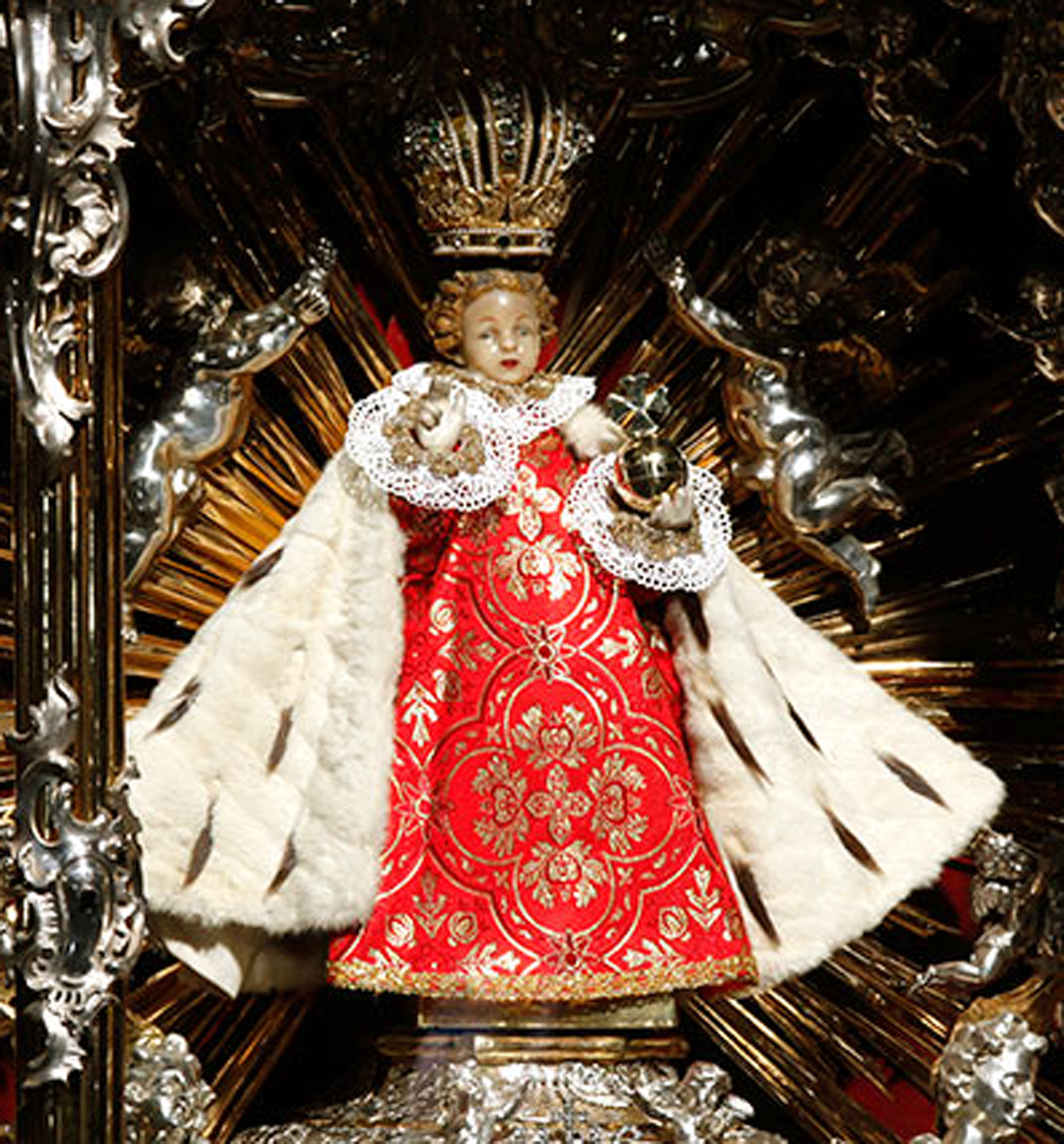
Statue of the Infant Jesus of Prague, given by Princess Polyxena of Lobkowicz to the Discalced Carmelites in 1628

The Christ Child, also known as Baby Jesus, Infant Jesus, Child Jesus, Divine Child, Divine Infant, and the Holy Child, refers to Jesus Christ during his early years. The term refers to a period of Jesus' life, described in the canonical Gospels, encompassing his nativity in Bethlehem, the visit of the Magi, and his presentation at the Temple in Jerusalem. It also includes his childhood, culminating in the event where his parents find him in the Temple at age 12, after which the Gospels remain silent about his life until his baptism.

== Liturgical feasts ==
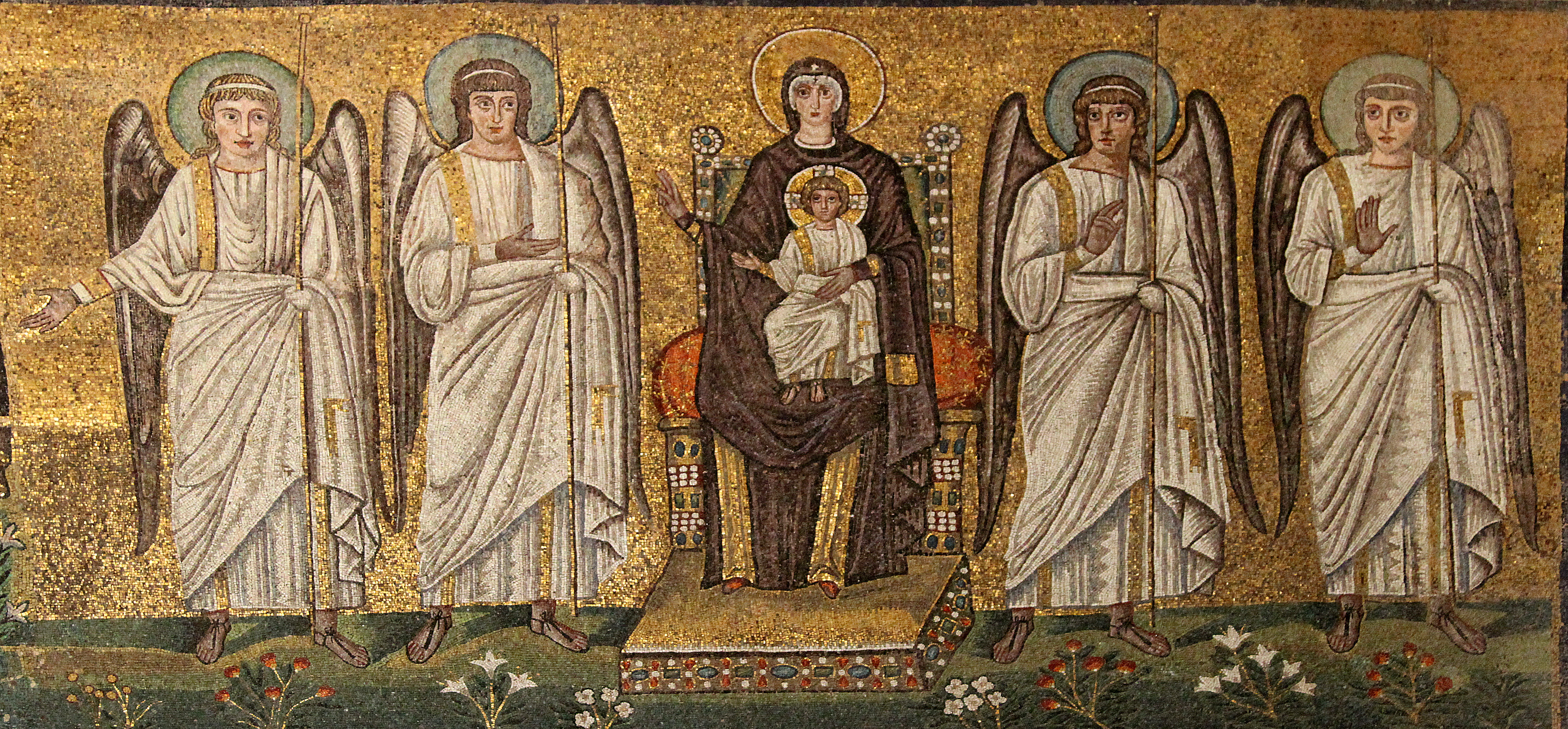
Sant'Apollinare Nuovo, Ravenna, mosaic of the Mother of God enthroned with the Child, surrounded by four angels

Liturgical feasts relating to Christ's infancy and childhood include:

- The Feast of the Nativity of Jesus Christ (25 December)
- The Feast of the Circumcision of Christ (1 January – Eastern Orthodox Church, Extraordinary form of the Roman Rite, Anglican calendars)
- The Feast of the Holy Name of Jesus (3 January – Roman Rite; others – various)
- The Feast of the Epiphany (6 January or 19 January in the Gregorian equivalent of the Julian calendar)
- The Feast of the Presentation of the Lord (2 February)

== Depictions in art ==
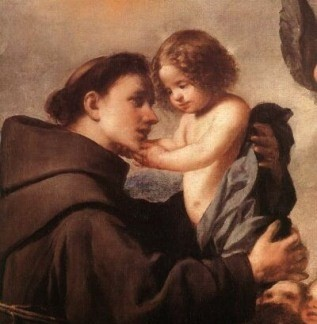
Anthony of Padua adoring the Christ Child. Oil on canvas, 1622, Antonio de Pereda

From about the third or fourth century onwards, the child Jesus is frequently shown in paintings, and sculpture. Commonly these are nativity scenes showing the birth of Jesus, with his mother Mary, and her husband Joseph.

Depictions as a baby with the Virgin Mary, known as Madonna and Child, are iconographical types in Eastern and Western traditions. Other scenes from his time as a baby, of his circumcision, presentation at the temple, the adoration of the Magi, and the flight into Egypt, are common. Scenes showing his developing years are more rare but not unknown.

Saint Joseph, Anthony of Padua, and Saint Christopher are often depicted holding the Christ Child. The Christian mystics Ss. Teresa of Ávila, Thérèse of Lisieux, along with the devotees of the Divino Niño such as Mother Angelica and Giovanni Rizzo claim to have had apparitions of the Infant Jesus.

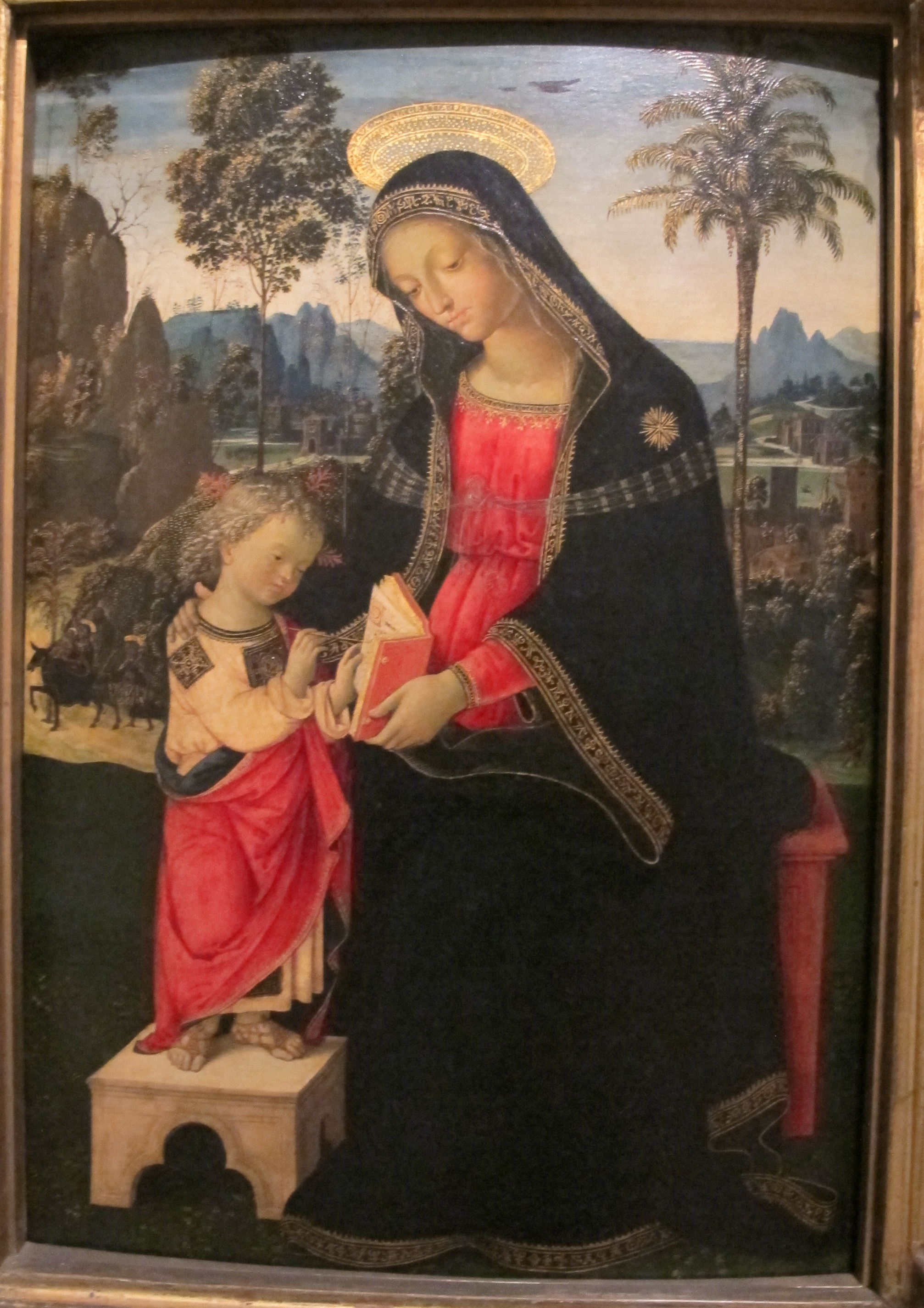
Madonna with the Christ Child Reading, Pinturicchio c. 1500

=== During the Middle Ages ===
The Christ Child was a popular subject in European wood sculpture beginning in the 14th century.

The Christ Child was well known in Spain under the title montañesino after the santero sculptor Juan Martínez Montañés began the trend. These icons of the Christ Child were often posed in the contrapposto style in which the positioning of the knees reflected in the opposite direction, similar to ancient depictions of the Roman Emperor.

The images were quite popular among nobility of Spain and Portugal. Colonial images of the Christ child also began to wear vestments, a pious practice developed by the santero culture in later colonial years, carrying the depiction of holding the globus cruciger, a bird symbolizing a soul or the Holy Spirit, or various paraphernalia related to its locality or region.

The symbolism of the Christ Child in art reached its apex during the Renaissance: the Holy Family was a central theme in the works of Leonardo da Vinci and many other masters.

== Apocrypha ==
The canonical gospels do not include very many details on young Jesus – there are the two nativity accounts in Matthew and Luke, and the account of Luke of a 12-year old Jesus at the Temple, but they are not very long. Audiences have hungered for more detail. As a result, infancy gospels circulated with more stories of the young Jesus, often showing Jesus full of power and wisdom even at an early age, and providing details of the nature of his family members. The two most prominent infancy gospels were the Gospel of James and the Infancy Gospel of Thomas. Neither are part of the New Testament canon, thus relegating them to a status as Biblical apocrypha, but these were popular and widely circulated stories taken seriously by many writers and audiences. These stories, as well as others, were often arranged and mixed together in new forms or with new stories added. For example, the Gospel of Pseudo-Matthew was very popular in the Latin-speaking Western Church in the Middle Ages, and combined the above two infancy accounts; another is the Armenian Infancy Gospel. Pseudo-Matthew helped popularize the idea of an ox and donkey being present at the nativity, as well as Joseph being rather older than Mary, and was used as a source of stories for depicting the Life of Mary, a popular medieval artistic theme. Other infancy gospels exist as well, such as the History of Joseph the Carpenter and the Arabic Infancy Gospel.

One story from these infancy gospels that became commonly known and spread far was that of the young Jesus making sparrows out of clay with his young playmates. After an adult accuses him of breaking the Sabbath (prefiguring a canonical pericope where Jesus does this), he animates the clay sparrows to life and they fly off, mischievously removing the evidence of him having been working.

== Devotional images ==
Several historically significant images of the Christ Child have been canonically crowned, namely the Bambino Gesu of Arenzano and the Santo Bambino of Aracoeli (both in Italy), the Infant Jesus of Prague (Czech Republic), the Infant Jesus of Mechelen (Belgium), and the Santo Niño de Cebú (Philippines).

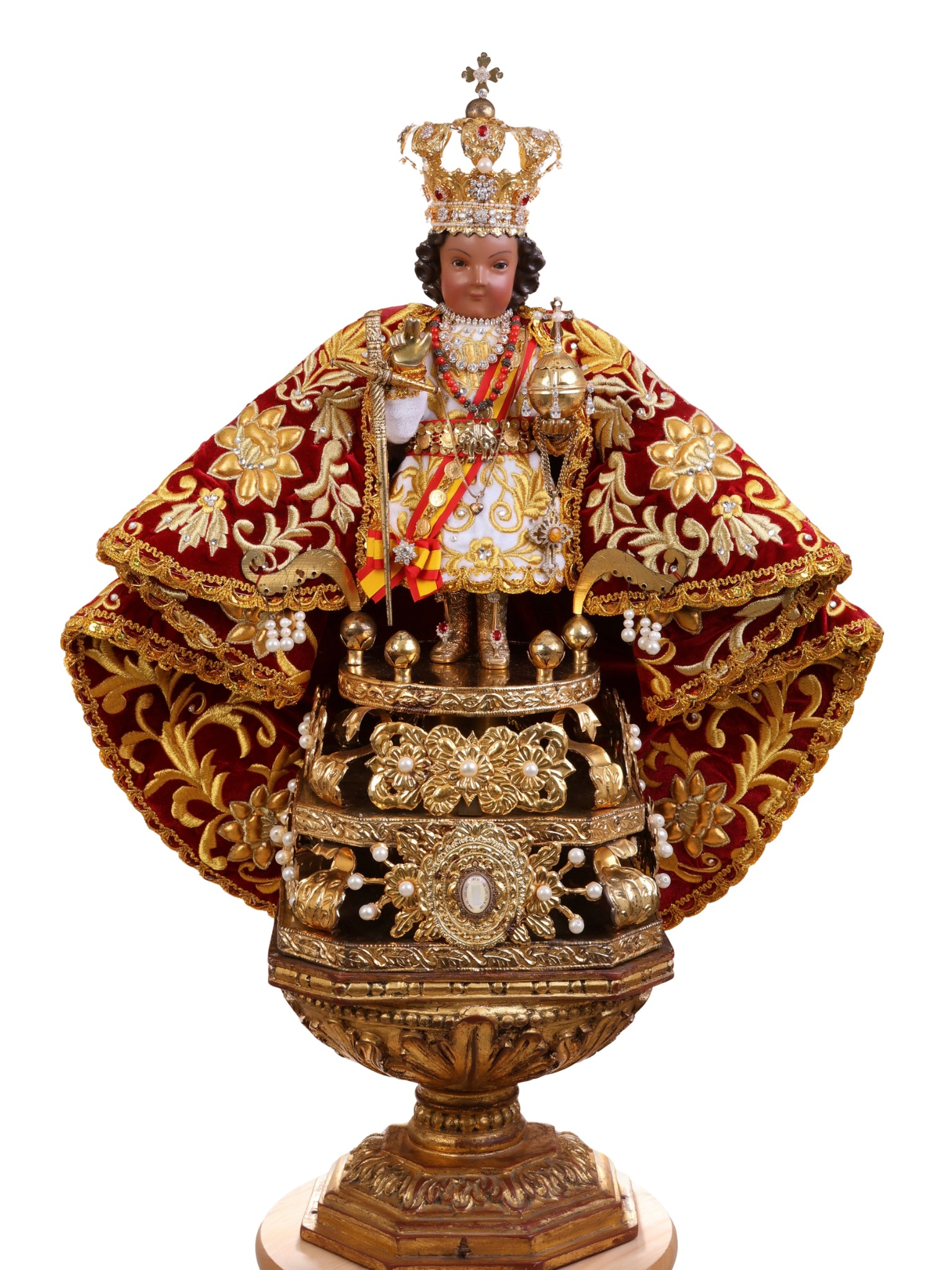
The Santo Niño de Cebu

In the 17th century, French Carmelites promoted veneration of the "Little King of Beaune". In the late 19th century, a devotion to the "Holy Child of Remedy" developed in Madrid.

== Music ==
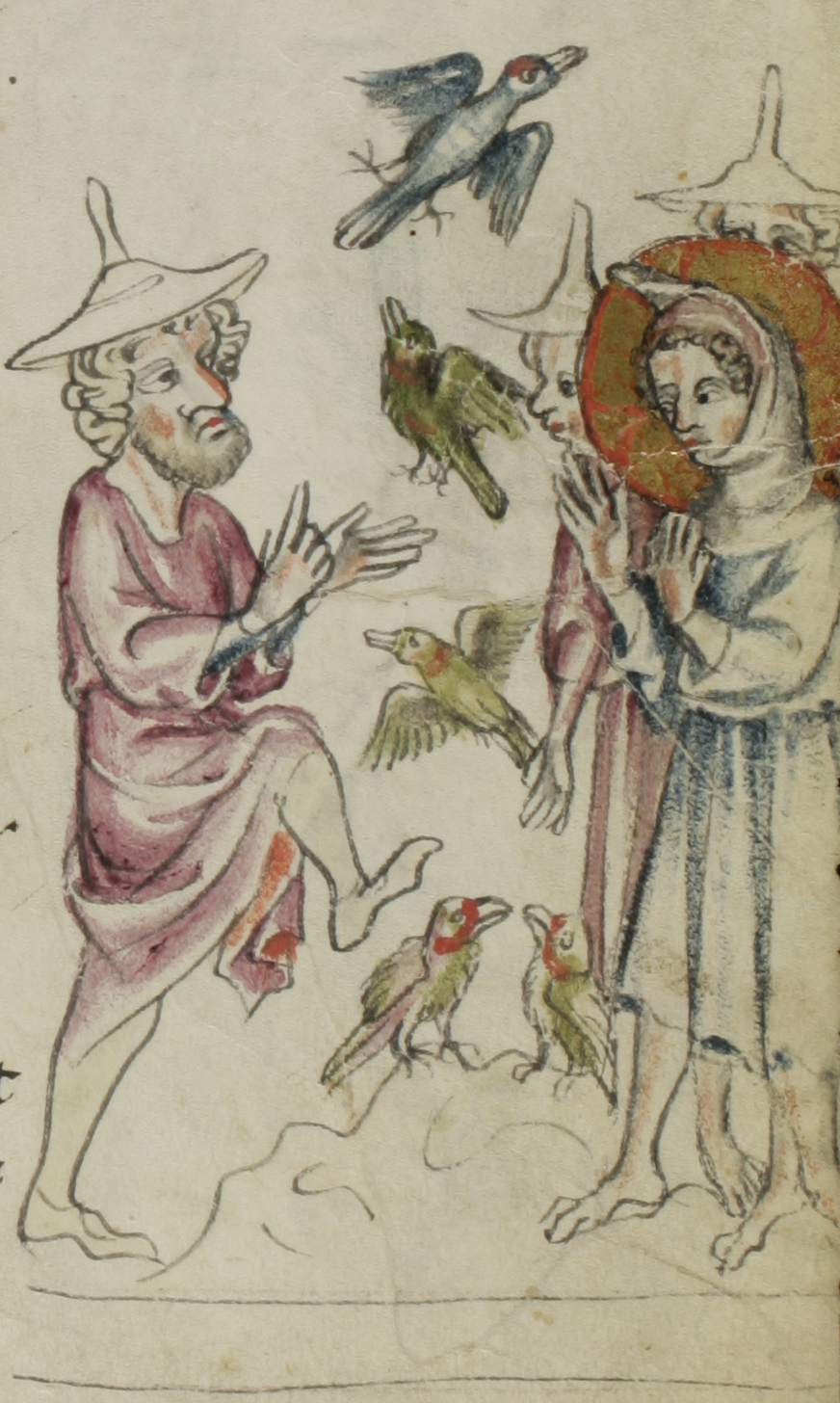
Young Jesus animating birds from clay on the Sabbath, from Klosterneuburger Evangelienwerk, a 14th-century manuscript from Austria

Tàladh Chrìosda ("Christ Child Lullaby") is a Scottish carol from Moidart, Scotland. The Catholic priest Ranald Rankin, wrote the lyrics for Midnight Mass c. 1855. He originally wrote 29 verses in Scottish Gaelic, but the popular English translation is limited to five. The melody, Cumha Mhic Arois ("Lament for Mac Àrois"), is from the Hebrides and was sung as a protective charm for the fisherman away at sea. The rhythm mirrors the rhythm of the surf. It is sung in the Hebrides at Midnight Mass on Christmas Eve.

== Archconfraternity of the Holy Infancy ==
In 1636, a Discalced Carmelite nun, Venerable Margaret of the Blessed Sacrament, founded the Association of the Child Jesus in Beaune, France, in honour of the divine infancy. Later, the Bishop of Autun canonically established the Confraternity of the Holy Infancy. In 1639, a chapel was built in the Carmel of Beaune, dedicated to the Infant Jesus. Gaston Jean Baptiste de Renty donated a statue which came to be referred to the "Little King of Grace". He then introduced Jean-Jacques Olier, founder of the Sulpicians, to Sister Margaret. Olier then established the devotion to the Holy Infant at Saint-Sulpice, Paris. François Fénelon, who was then a priest at Saint-Sulpice, composed litanies of the Infant Jesus. Pope Alexander VII approved the Confraternity in January 1661; Pius IX made it an archconfraternity in 1855.

== Gallery ==
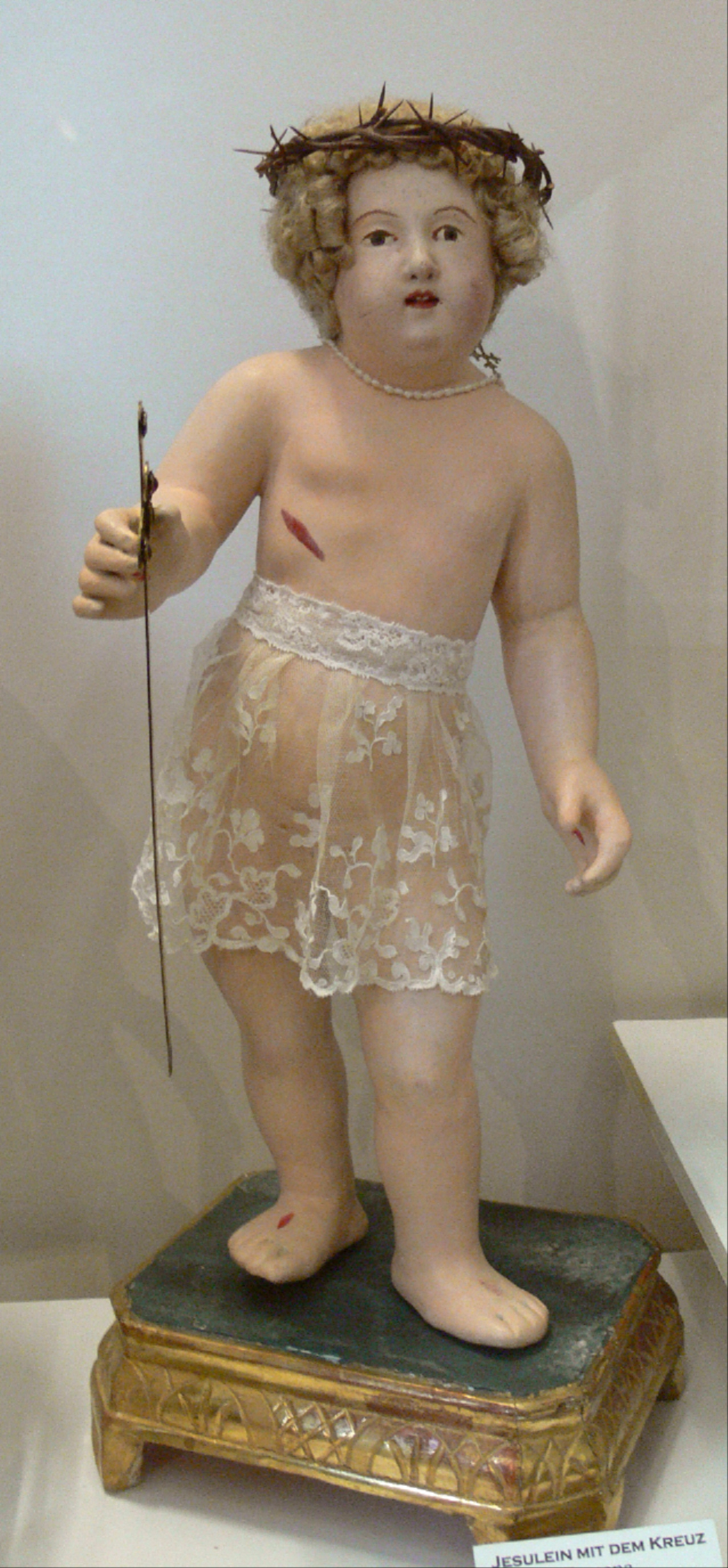
Child Jesus representing the Passion of Jesus Christ, c. 1820, Weingarten

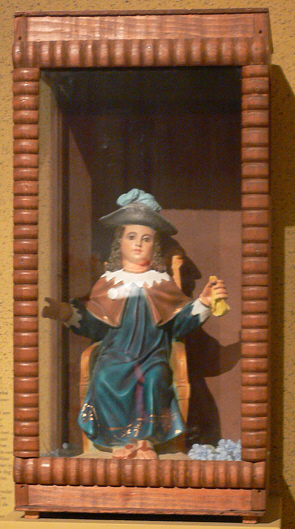
Holy Infant of Atocha, Mexico

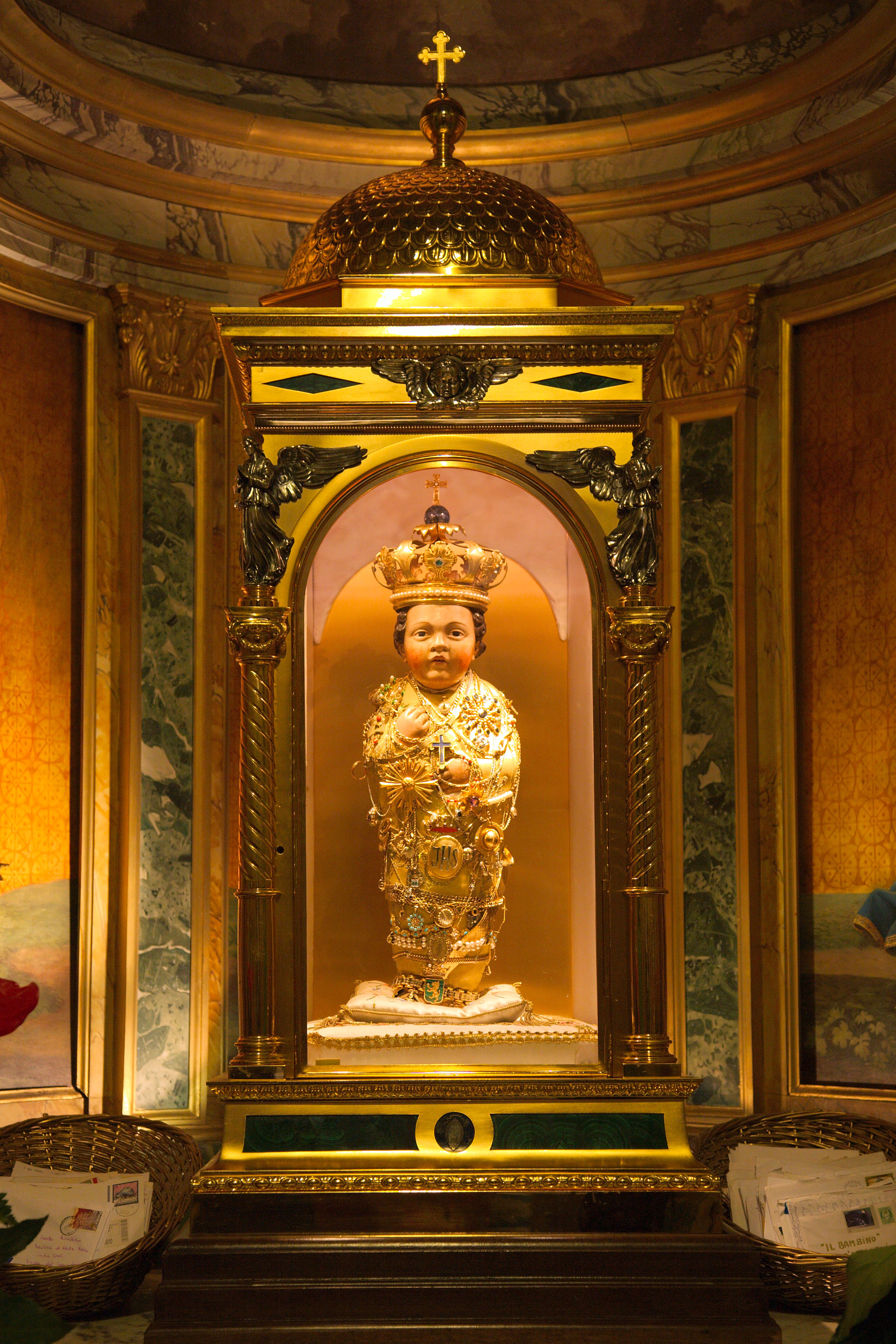
Santo Bambino of Aracoeli, Rome

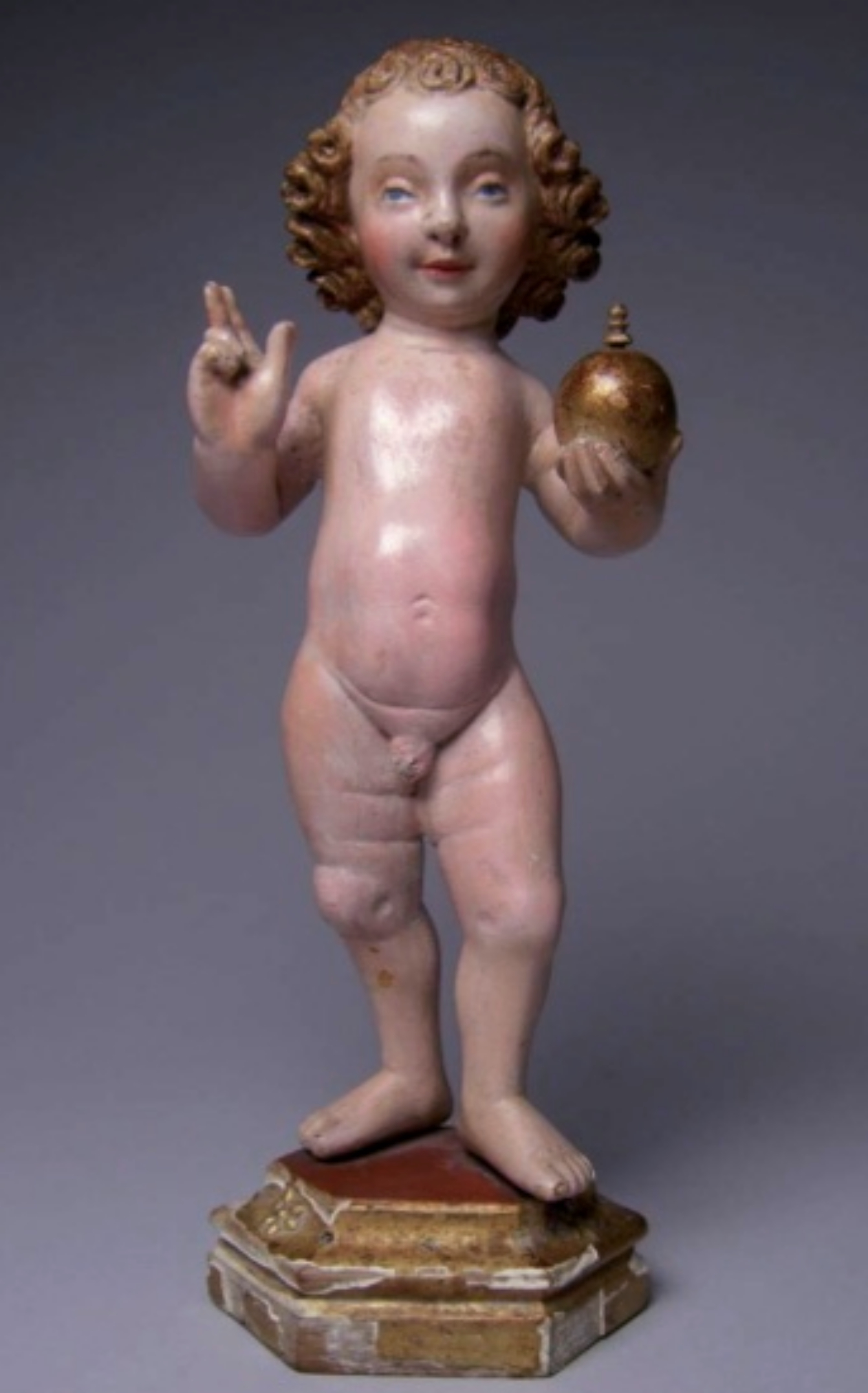
Infant Jesus of Mechelen, Louvre

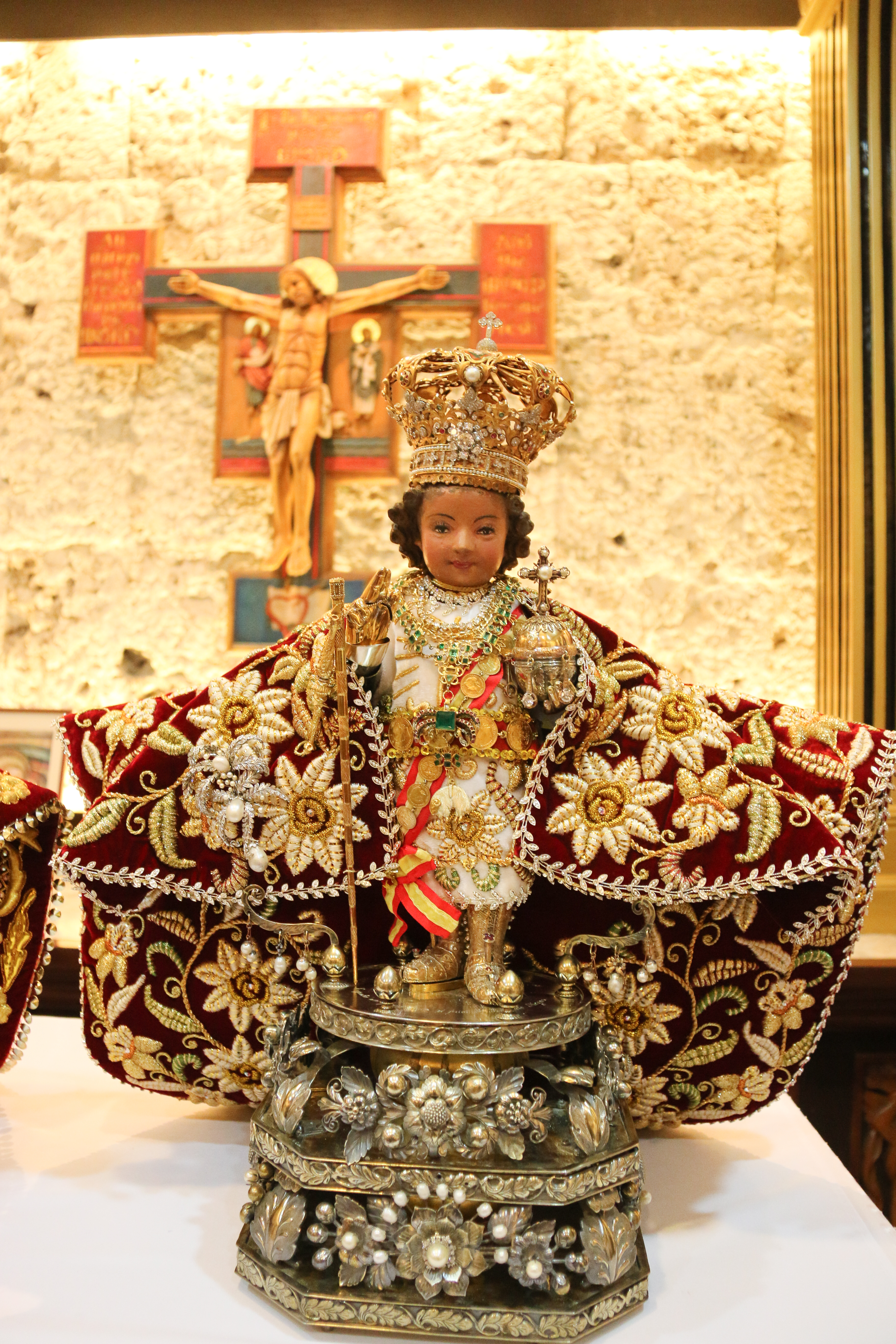
Santo Niño de Cebu, Philippines

== See also ==
- Child Jesus images in Mexico
- Holy Infant of Good Health
- Infant Jesus of Mechelen
- Infant Jesus of Prague
- Santo Niño (disambiguation)
- Santo Niño de Atocha
- Infant Mary – similar devotion to Mary
- Studies of an Infant
