= El Santo Niño, Baja California Sur =

El Santo Niño
- village
- Location in Mexico
- Coordinates: 23°38′27″N 110°16′35″W
- Country: Mexico
- State: Baja California Sur
- Municipality: La Paz
- Elevation: 169 m (554 ft)

Population (2010)
  - Total: 24

El Santo Niño is a small village in Baja California Sur in La Paz Municipality. The village had a population of 24 as of 2010.
