= Infant Jesus of Mechelen =

16th-century wooden sculpture

Infant Jesus of Mechelen l'Enfant Jesus de Malines
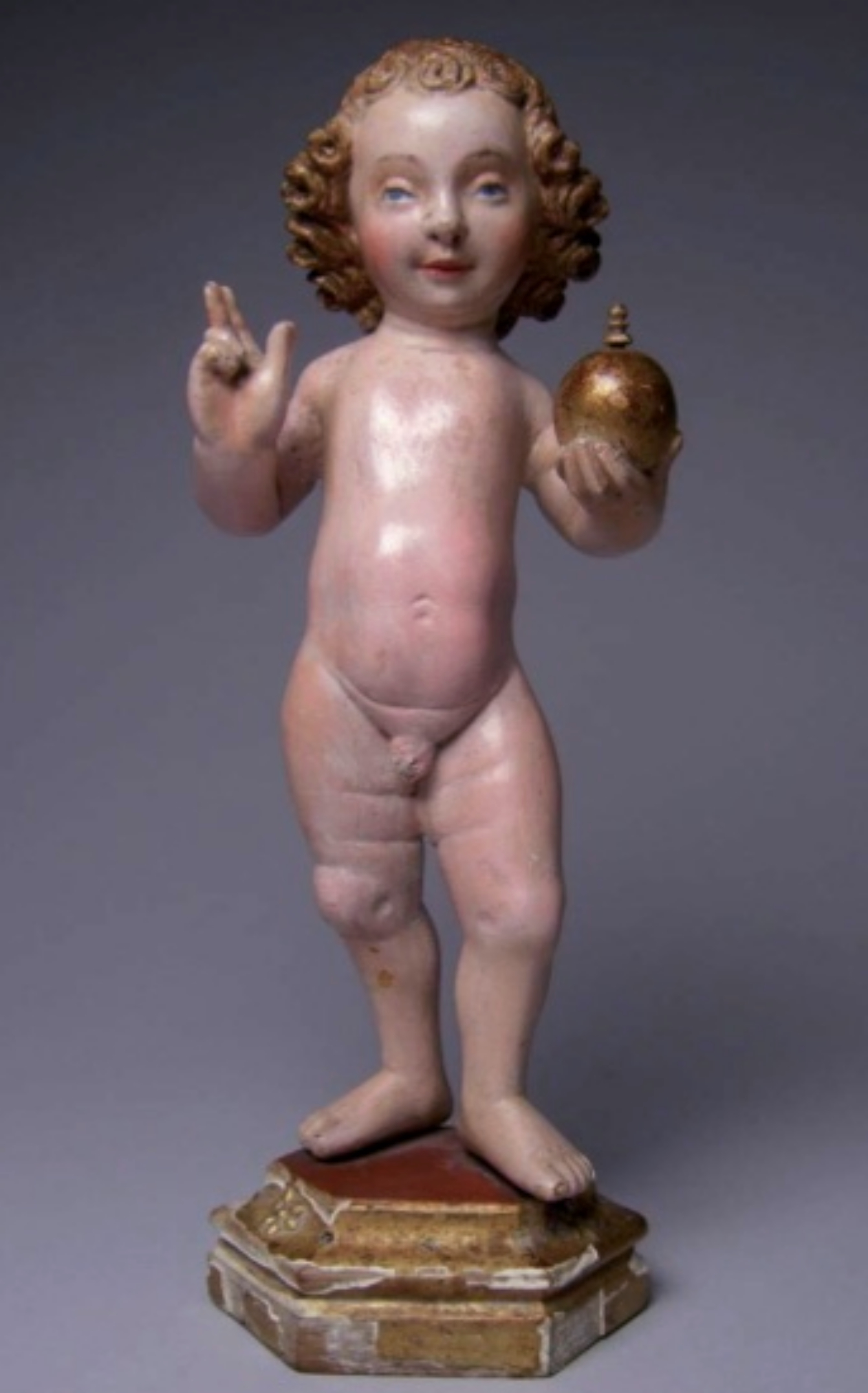
- Location: Louvre Museum; Department of Sculptures
- Date: c.1500s
- Type: Walnut body Polychrome and Gilding; Oak wood base

The Infant Jesus of Mechelen (French: l'Enfant Jésus de Malines) is an unadorned 16th-century wooden image depicting the Child Jesus holding a globus cruciger and imparting a blessing. It is now in the Louvre Museum in Paris, as a typical representative of a type of image produced in considerable numbers in 16th-century Mechelen (Malines, modern Belgium) and exported all over the Catholic world.

Among santo collectors, the image is often referred to the “fraternal twin” of the Santo Niño de Cebú, which is widely venerated in the Philippines. The two images have crucial similarities in posture, gestures, facial expression, and dimensions. In September 2009, the image was privately acquired and is now housed in the Louvre Museum under security glass. It is displayed naked without the regalia, accessories or vestments found on many Child Jesus icons.

== Background ==
In the mid-fifteenth century, workshops in Mechelen (Malines, in modern Belgium) began producing small statuettes of male and female saints, and of the Infant Jesus, nude and standing on a socle. The dolls are almost always of walnut, preferably carved from a single block of wood. The guild in Mechelen collaborated with workshops in Brussels, and a client could order these Poupées de Malines (“Malines dolls”) with the distinctive polychromy from either.

These images often were part of an altarpiece or an “Enclosed Garden”, which were “retables, sometimes with painted side panels, the central section filled not only with narrative sculpture, but also with all sorts of trinkets and hand-worked textiles.”

Used for private devotion, “Malines dolls” were primarily found in private chapels and beguinages. The Infant Jesus proved particularly popular with convents in the region. Produced in large quantities, they were relatively inexpensive, and became a popular item of export to Spain and Portugal. By the first quarter of the sixteenth century, the dolls were ubiquitous throughout Europe.

== Description ==
The image depicts Jesus Christ in his infancy stage. The polychrome materials and characteristics are distinctly from Mechelen, a former part of the Southern Netherlands dating from the early 1500s. The child image alone is made of walnut, carved from a single piece of wood. The present image comprises the following details:

- A cross presumably attached to the Globus Cruciger is missing, and is replaced with a modern finial.
- The uncircumcised phallus of the image is mutilated, unrestored.
- The right forearm of the image is cracked and broken, but was re-attached.
- The feet of the child are attached to its hexagonal peana (base) or red lacquered socks using two metal rods (similar to Neapolitan Jesus images).
- The frontal hexagonal socket is of oak wood, carved with floral and bead motifs.
- The facial resemblance of the image is playfully frolic, with a pinched mouth and pinkish cheekbones.
- The statue follows the Salvator Mundi (“Saviour of the World”) style of Christological imagery.
- The curled hair is gilded with pure gold leaf. There is no evidence of a hair wig in place.

Evidence of European colonial characteristics are present on the statue, such as the gilding of the hair using gold leaf, while lead paint and oily potassium is used to the skin, similar to the encarnación technique of sculpting and painting. Further microscopic examination shows the image was carved in Mechelen, but was probably painted in Brussels before distribution in the Spanish colonial empire.

== Comparison with the Santo Niño de Cebú ==
Both the Infant Jesus of Mechelen and the Santo Niño de Cebú are of the same height at approximately 30 cm (12 inches) tall. Similar traits are the standing pose, naked body, right hand in a blessing gesture, and golden orbs in the left. Assuming that the camera shots are frontally accurate, the facial features are almost exactly identical with the following exceptions:

- In published photographs, the Mechelen statue looks front and ahead in a direct line, while the Cebú statue looks downward to the devotee, although this is relative to the angle of the camera when the picture was taken.
- The Cebú statue's fingers lean to the left, while those of the Mechelen statue point to the right. The original wooden fingers of the Cebú statue, however, point upwards when its golden glove is removed. It is possible the original wooden arm of the Cebu statue was broken and improperly reattached given the presence of a metallic brace wrapping the wooden arm when the vestments and golden glove are removed.
- The Mechelen statue’s blond hair is sculpted all the way to the nape or close to the neckline, while the Cebú statue appears to have sculpted hair only up to its earlobes. More recent photos show the Cebú statue’s hair is sculpted to the nape as with the Mechelen statue.

== Acquisition by the Louvre Museum ==
The history of the image’s previous ownership is unknown and unpublished by neither the Louvre nor Parisian authorities until its acquisition from a private collector in September 2009 by the Louvre Endowment Fund. It underwent polychrome study, xylology inspection, and radiography to confirm its age and the authenticity of its colonial style. The image is presently housed in the Louvre Museum under the Department of Sculptures.

In 2012, several American Traditionalist Catholics from Texas and New York petitioned the Louvre Endowment Fund that it purchase and release custody of the image, but the request was denied. The French magazine La Tribune de l'art featured the image on 16 June 2010 as part of recent Mediaeval acquisitions by the Louvre Museum.

== See also ==
- Child Jesus
- Santo Niño de Cebú
- Infant Jesus of Prague
- List of Images with Canonical Coronation
- List of statues of Jesus
