= Santo Niño Church =

Santo Niño Church may refer to:

== Basilica Minor ==
- Basilica del Santo Niño, a minor basilica in Cebu

== Archdiocesan Shrines ==
- Santo Niño Church (Tacloban)
- Santo Niño Church (Midsayap)
- Santo Niño Church (Tondo)

== Parish Church ==
- Santo Niño de Pandacan Church, a church in Pandacan, Manila
