= Seal of Cebu City =

Official symbol of Cebu City, Philippines

Seal of Cebu

Versions
- Old seal of Cebu City prior to the current one

- Former seal of Cebu City, NHCP-registered design, 1950
- Armiger: Cebu
- Motto: City of Cebu
- Other elements: The structure which houses the Magellan's Cross proper on top of Chequy equal to the number of barangays of Cebu City, sable and argent.
- Earlier version: 1950

The Seal of Cebu City is one of the official symbols of Cebu City, Philippines.

The seal is composed of the structure containing Magellan's Cross one of the historical landmarks of the city which symbolizes the strong foundation of the Catholic faith of the city's residents. Below the structure are 80 black and white tiles which symbolizes the 80 barangays of the city.

== Former seal and variants ==
The official seal of Cebu City, just like any other official seals of local government units in the Philippines, underwent several cosmetic changes and even replacements which deviated from designs that are initially approved by the National Historical Commission of the Philippines' Heraldry Division since 1950. These changes were often used concurrent to the ruling politicians or local political parties and some, if not most, were not submitted to the NHCP Heraldry Division for review and final approval of the president. And most of these changes depict elements that doesn't follow basic rules of heraldry. Such changes are deemed illegal under the provisions of Article VI of the Republic Act 8491, but such provisions are not proactive.

The chequy pattern in the 1950 coat of arms may possibly alludes to the coat of arms of Ferdinand Magellan, the first European explorer to have landed in the island. The chequy pattern also appears on the coat of arms of the provincial seal of Cebu. However, the chequy pattern has been changed into a more chessboard-like design, and the symbolism now represents the constituting barangays that formed the city.

Exact dates of replacement of the official seal and arms of Cebu City could not be determined, except only that the original seal of the city was in use since 1950.

A variant for the city mayor's office was in use before it was replaced sometime in 2018.

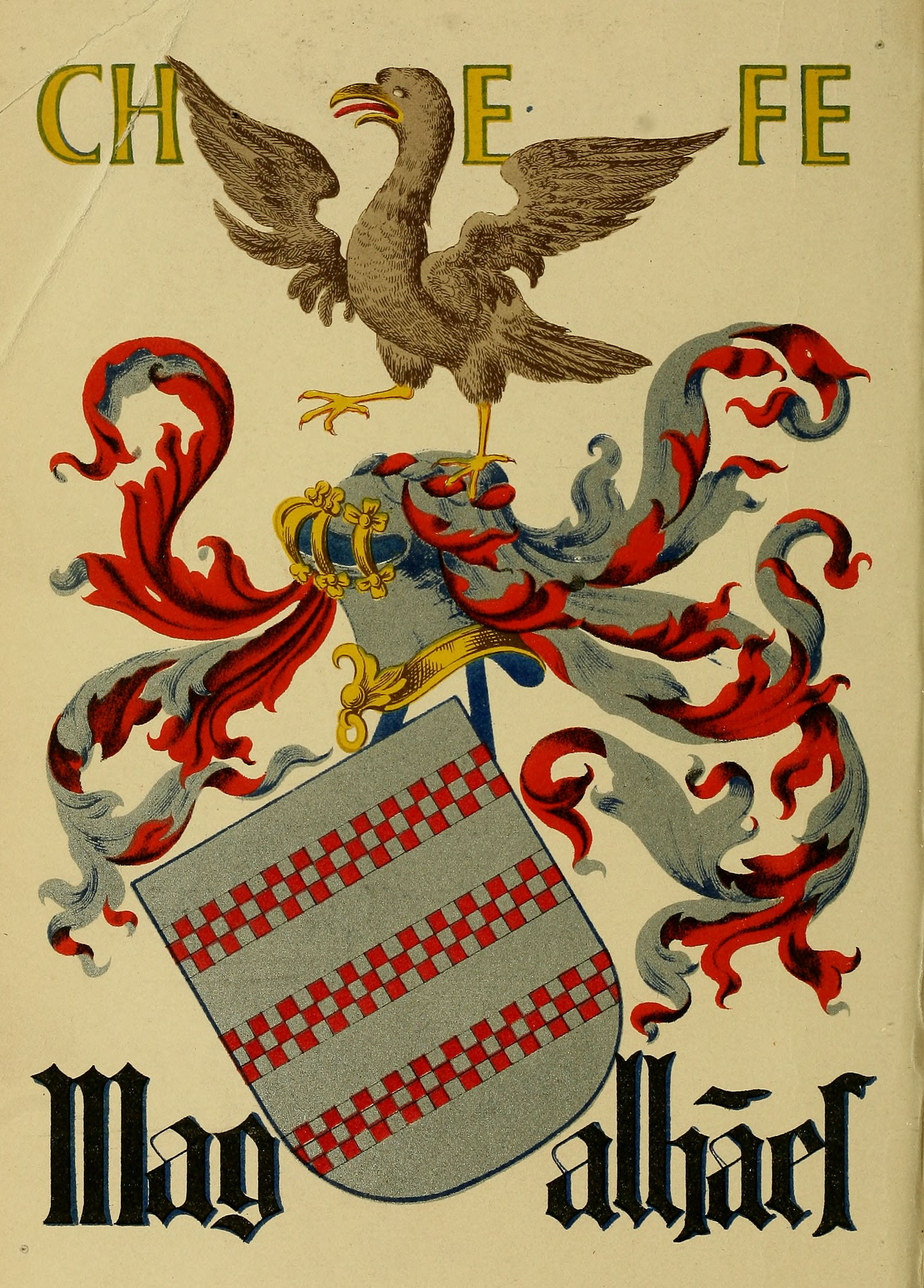
Coat of arms of Ferdinand Magellan, from the First Voyage Round the World by Antonio Pigafetta

Old seal of Cebu City, variant for the Office of the City Mayor
