= Ambrosio Galindez =

Ambrosio "Boy" Casimero Galindez (November 2, 1930 – June 12, 2011) was a Filipino Catholic Augustinian priest from Garcia Hernandez, Bohol, Philippines. He was the first Filipino rector of the local Augustinian community. He took his vows on June 25, 1953, at Convento de San Agustin, Intramuros, Manila, followed by solemn vows on June 26, 1956, at Collegio Santa Monica, Rome. He was ordained as a priest in Rome on July 22, 1959.

== Biography ==
Ambrosio Galindez became a parish priest at San Agustin Parish in Intramuros, Manila, and at San Jose Parish in Iloilo City. He also served as the leader of Basilica Minore del Santo Niño de Cebu in Cebu City from 1973 to 1974 and again from 1982 to 1988. He was a rector of the University of San Agustin in Iloilo City and of Colegio San Agustin in Makati City.

He is also known as the "Father of Dinagyang" after he introduced the devotion to Santo Niño in Iloilo City in November 1967.
