= Seal of Cebu =

Seal of the province of Cebu, The Philippines

Versions
- NHCP-registered variant
- Armiger: Cebu
- Shield: Quarterly first and fourth chequy Gules and Argent; second and third Azure, on an inescutcheon Or, a bolo knife and spear proper in saltire, overall a bend Argent charged with six oysters Or.
- Motto: Province of Cebu
- Earlier version: 1950

The Seal of Cebu is one of the official symbols of the province of Cebu in the Philippines.

The seal is composed of a shield divided in quarters enclosed in a circle. The upper left and lower right quarters are composed of 48 small squares colored red and white. The spear and bolo represents the resistance against oppression as symbolized by Lapu-Lapu's victory over Ferdinand Magellan and his forces at the Battle of Mactan. The six oysters represents six generals who led a revolution against Spanish and American colonizers - Generals Arcadio Maxilom, Saturnino Echávez, Arsenio Cabreros, Pantaleón "Leon Kilat" Villegas, Francisco Jaca, and Eugenio Ginés.

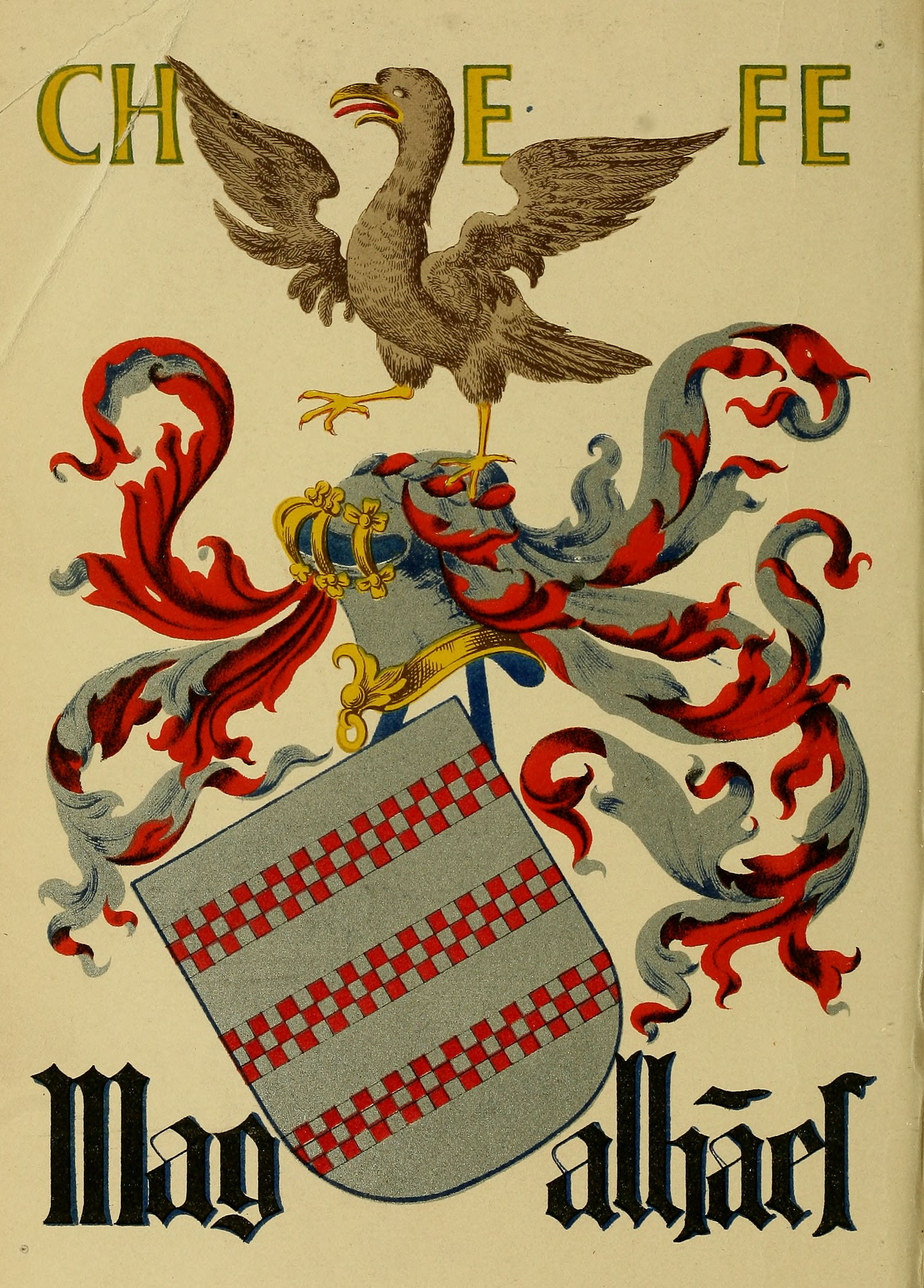
Coat of arms of Ferdinand Magellan, from the First Voyage Round the World by Antonio Pigafetta

The squares in the chequy pattern represents the total number of local government units in the province. However, the chequy pattern in the arms of the 1950 variant of the seal may possibly alludes to the coat of arms of Ferdinand Magellan, the first European to land in the island province. Recently, the pattern has been changed into a more chessboard-like design just like in the current seal of Cebu City, and the symbolism now represents the constituting municipalities and cities that formed the province.
