= Basilica del Santo Niño =

Catholic church in Cebu City, Philippines

Santo Niño Basilica
- Basílica Minore del Santo Niño de Cebú
- The Mother and Head of all Churches in the Philippines / The Principal Church of the Philippines (Note: It is the only claimant of the title of mother church in the country which was canonically declared as such by Pope Paul VI in 1965,l.)
- Basilika Menor ng Santo Niño ng Cebu (Filipino); Basilika Minor sa Santo Niño sa Sugbo (Cebuano)
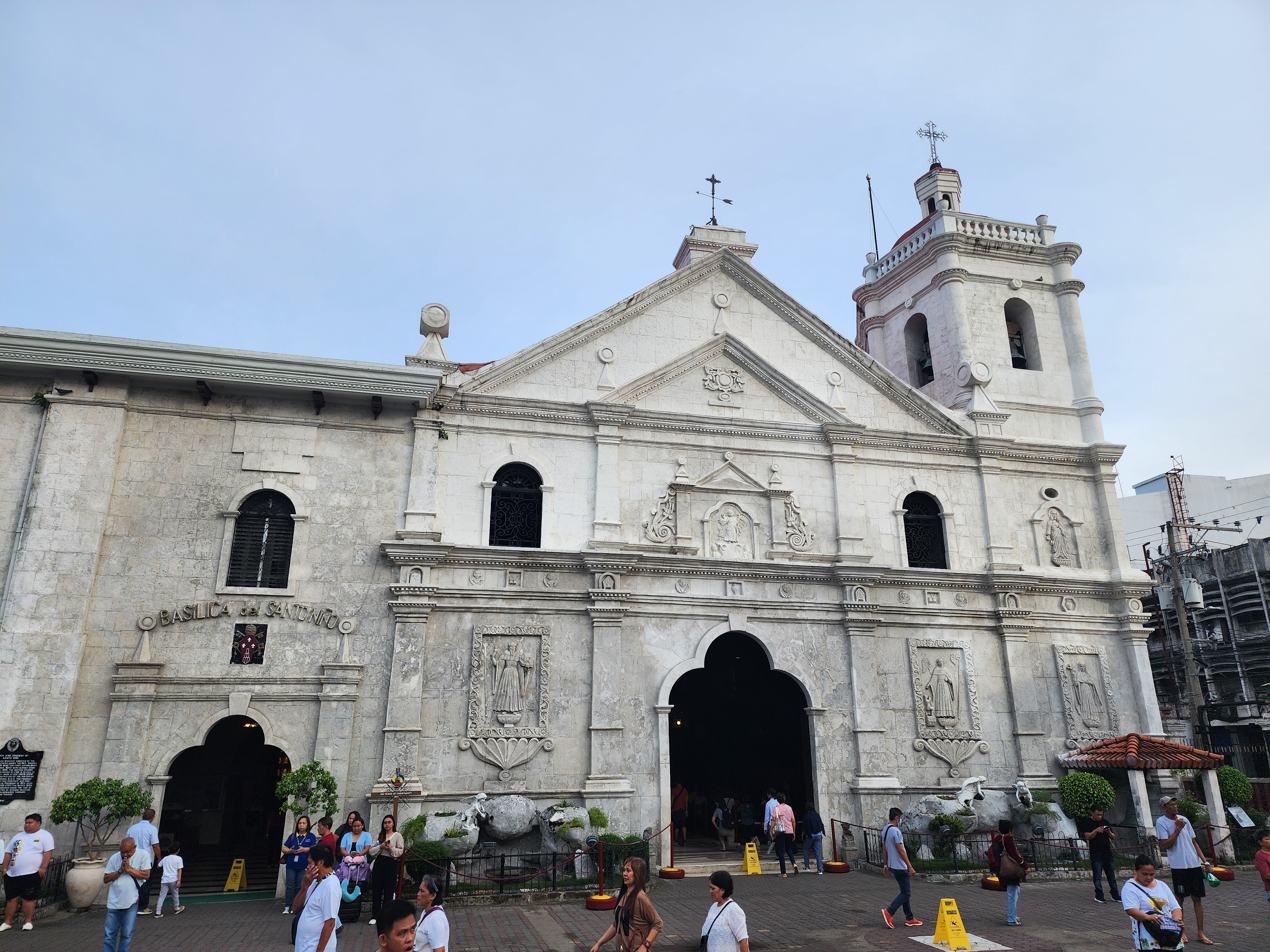
- Basilica facade in 2024

- Location in Metro Cebu Location in Cebu Location in the Visayas Location in the Philippines
- 10°17′38″N 123°54′5″E
- Location: Cebu City
- Country: Philippines
- Language(s): Cebuano, English
- Denomination: Latin Catholic
- Religious order: Order of St. Augustine
- Website: Basilica del Santo Niño

History
- Former name(s): Church and Convent of Saint Augustine
- Status: Minor basilica
- Founded: April 28, 1565; 461 years ago
- Founder(s): Andrés de Urdaneta, O.S.A. Diego de Herrera, O.S.A.
- Dedication: Santo Niño de Cebú
- Dedicated: February 28, 1965; 61 years ago
- Earlier dedication: January 16, 1740; 286 years ago
- Events: Sinulog (Third Sunday of January); Kaplag (April 28)

Architecture
- Functional status: Active
- Heritage designation: National Historical Landmark; National Cultural Treasure
- Designated: August 1, 1973; April 14, 2021
- Architect(s): Fray Juan de Albarran, O.S.A.
- Architectural type: Cruciform church and convent
- Style: Blend of Earthquake Baroque, Muslim, Romanesque and Neo-classical.
- Years built: c. 1565 (dst. 1566); 1605–1626 (dst. 1628); c. 1628 (later stopped); 1735–1740
- Groundbreaking: February 24, 1735; 291 years ago
- Completed: January 16, 1740; 286 years ago

Specifications
- Length: 62.3 m (204 ft)
- Width: 17.7 m (58 ft)
- Materials: Stone

Administration
- Archdiocese: Cebu
- Deanery: Most Holy Rosary

Clergy
- Rector: Rev. Fr. Andres D. Rivera Jr., O.S.A.

National Historical Landmarks
- Official name: Church and Convent of Santo Niño
- Type: House of Worship
- Designated: August 1, 1973
- Region: Central Visayas
- Legal Basis: Presidential Decree No. 260, s. 1973
- Marker Date: 1941

National Cultural Treasures
- Official name: Basilica Minore del Santo Niño de Cebu
- Designated: April 14, 2021
- Region: Central Visayas

The Basílica Minore del Santo Niño de Cebú, or simply the Santo Niño Basilica, is a Catholic minor basilica in Cebu City, Philippines. It was originally founded by Augustinian friars Andrés de Urdaneta and Diego de Herrera in 1565. It is the oldest church in the country and is purported to have been built on the site where the image of the Santo Niño de Cebú was rediscovered during the expedition of the Spanish conquistador Miguel López de Legazpi.

The original image of the Child Jesus was presented by Ferdinand Magellan to the chief consort of Rajah Humabon on the occasion of their royal baptism in 1521. The image was later found by a soldier named Juan de Camuz 40 years afterward, following Legazpi’s burning of a local settlement.

The present building was completed in 1740 and was designated by the Holy See as the "Mother and Head of all Churches in the Philippines". It is administered by the Augustinian Province of Santo Niño de Cebu. Pope Paul VI raised the shrine to the status of minor basilica through his pontifical decree Ut Clarificetur Nomen on 1 April 1965. The decree was signed and notarized by Cardinal Amleto Cicognani.

== History ==
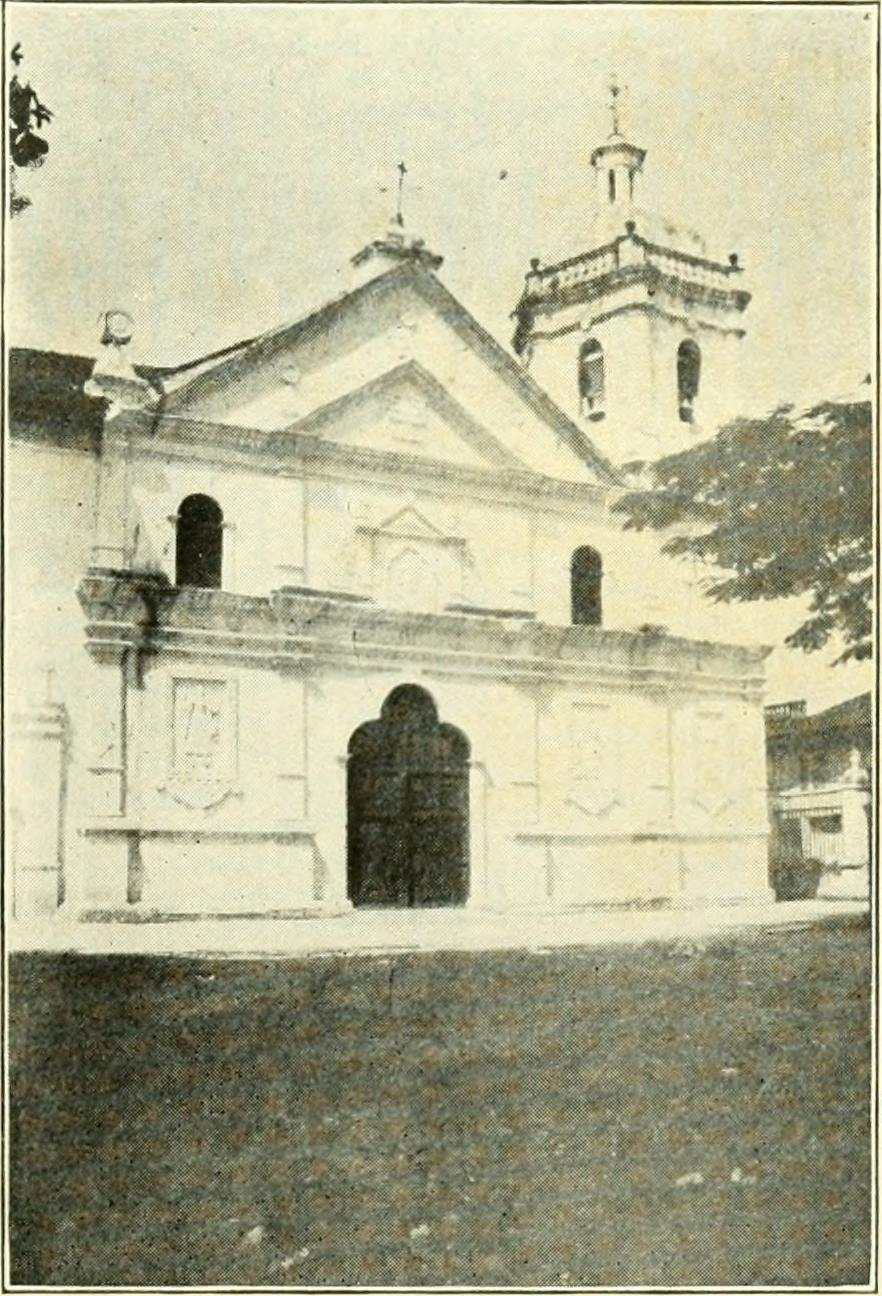
The Basilica in 1904

The church of the Holy Child (which was originally called the San Agustin Church) was founded by Fray Andrés de Urdaneta, O.S.A. on April 28, 1565, the day when the image of the Holy Child was found in a partially burned hut. After the rediscovery of the image on May 8, 1565, Miguel Lopez de Legazpi initiated the founding of the first Spanish settlement in the Philippines. The monastery of the Holy Name of Jesus was later constructed on the spot of the house where the image of the Santo Niño was found.

The first church to be built on the site where the image of the Holy Child was found was burned down on November 1, 1566. It was said to be built by Fr. Diego de Herrera using wood and nipa. Fray Pedro Torres, O.S.A. started the construction of a new church in 1605. It was finished in 1626 but was again burned in March 1628. Fray Juan Medina, O.S.A. started the construction of another church that year, using stone and bricks, a great innovation at that time. Construction was stopped because the structure was found to be defective.

=== Present church ===
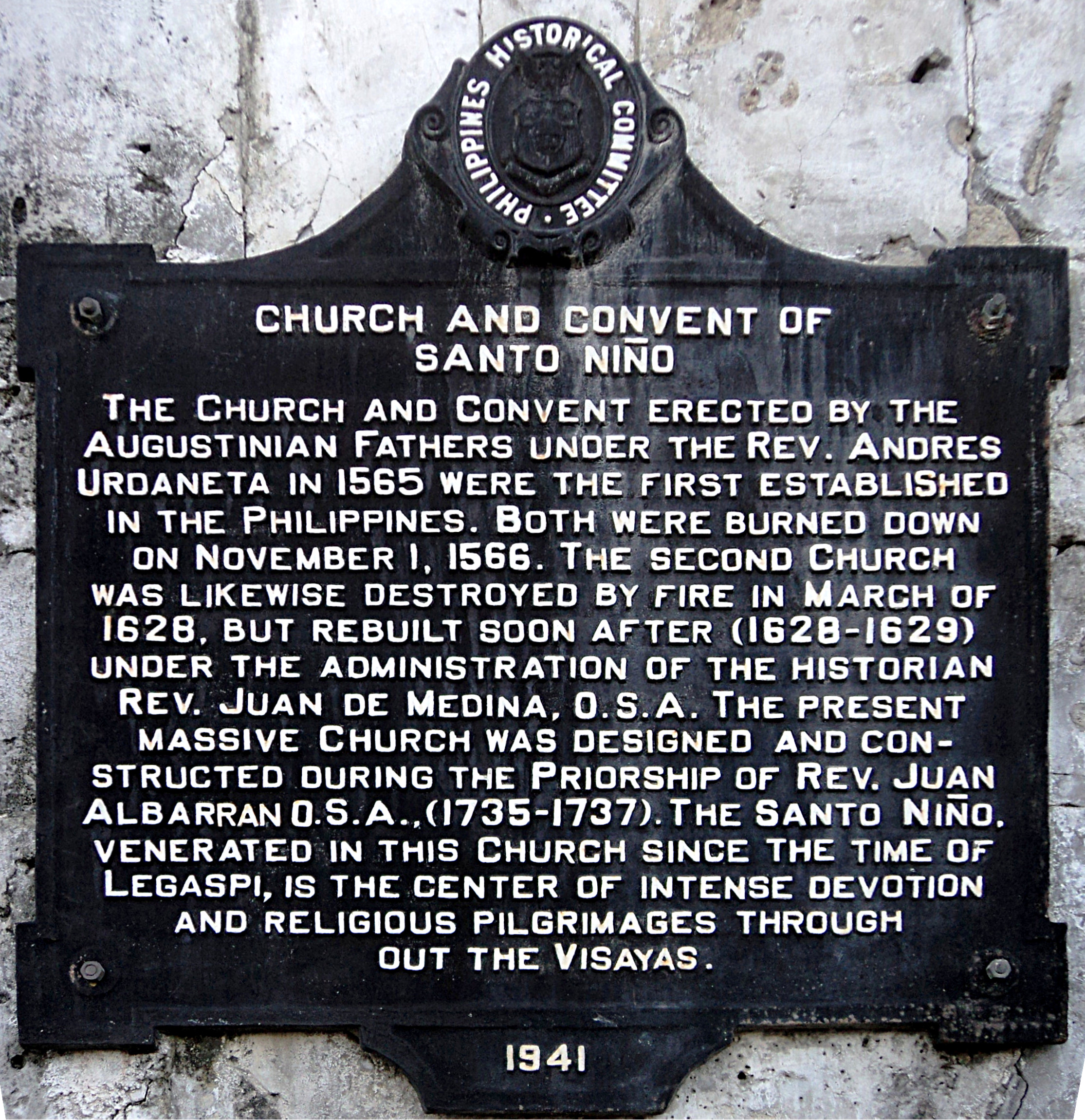
Church and convent PHC historical marker installed in 1941

On February 24, 1735, Father Provincial Bergaño, Governor-General Fernando Valdes, Bishop Manuel Antonio Decio y Ocampo of Cebu and Fray Juan de Albarran, O.S.A. started the foundations of the present church, using stone. Since the friars did not have the means to complete the church, they enlisted the help of the parishioners of Opon and San Nicolas to contribute materials, while the people of Talisay contributed labor. The lack of chief craftsmen and officers forced Fray Albarran to acquire some knowledge of architecture. On January 16, 1740, the present church was completed, and the miraculous image was enthroned in the new church.

In 1789, the church underwent a renovation. In 1889, Fray Mateo Diez, O.S.A. did another renovation. The original features of the church have been retained except for the windows which he added. In 1965, both the church and convent underwent a bigger restoration on the occasion of the fourth centennial of the Christianization of the country. The facelifting was made with utmost respect for the historical character of the old structure.

The basilica, which was once known as San Agustin Church, was rededicated by Cardinal Julio Rosales, then-Archbishop of Cebu, on February 28, 1965.

On April 1, 1965, Ildebrando Cardinal Antoniutti, Papal Legate to the Philippines, conferred the church the honorific title of Minor Basilica Basílica Minore upon the authority of Pope Paul VI. As a Minor Basilica, it is given precedence over other churches and other privileges. Philippine President Ferdinand E. Marcos also declared it a National Landmark. Paul VI also declared the basilica to be "the symbol of the birth and growth of Christianity in the Philippines." In his pontificate, the ecclesiastical document Ut Clarificetur designated the basilica as the "Mother and Head of all Churches in the Philippines" (Mater et Caput... Omnium Ecclesiarum Insularum Philippinarum).

The Basilica del Santo Niño remains under the care of the Augustinian Friars.

=== 2013 earthquake and restoration ===
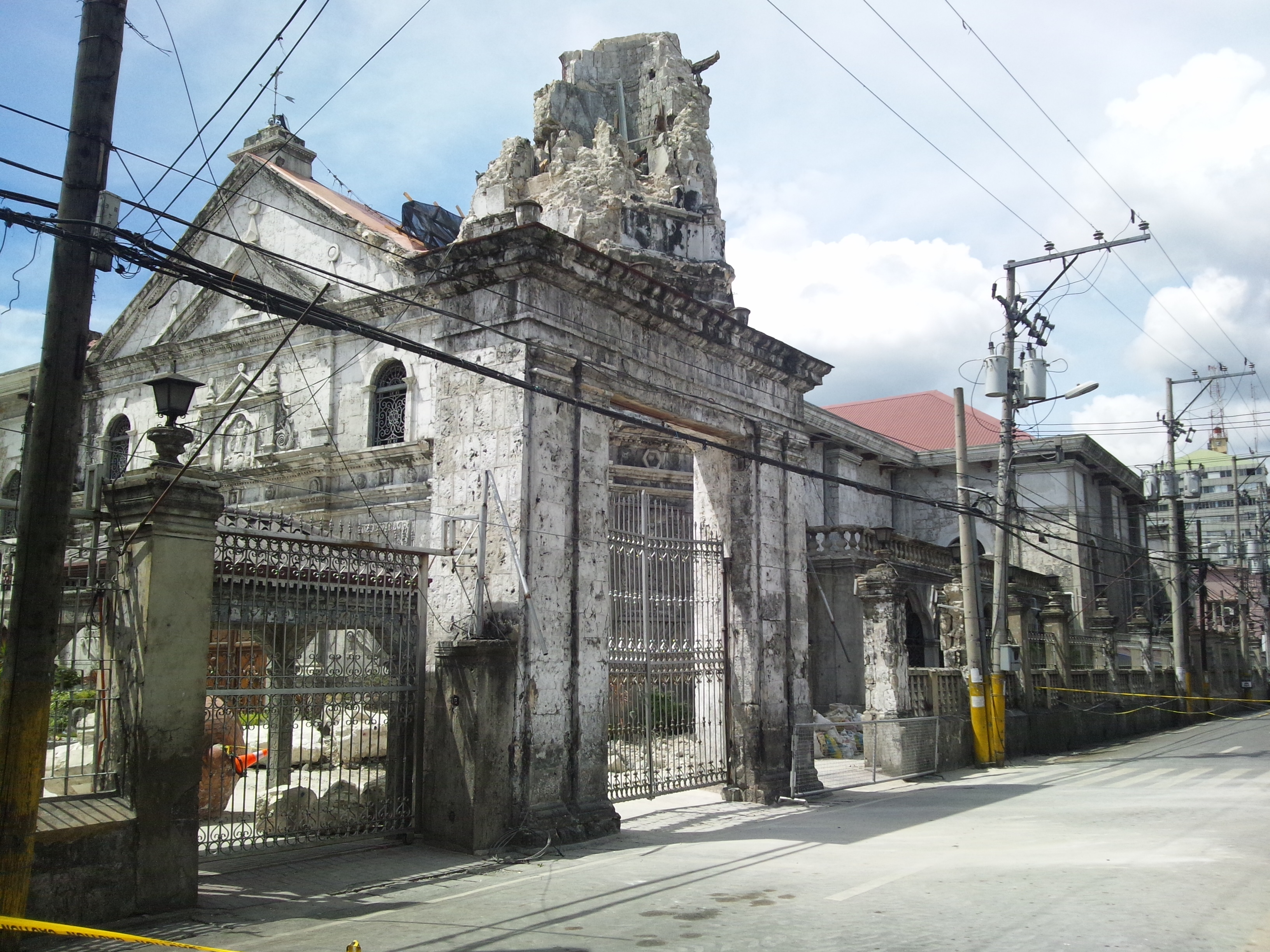
The church after the 2013 Bohol earthquake

On October 15, 2013, a 7.2-magnitude earthquake shook Bohol; its force felt throughout the Visayas. It caused more than 220 casualties, and damages to buildings, particularly historical landmarks and churches in Bohol. In Cebu City, the earthquake destroyed most of the Basilica's belfry and façade; some walls and frescoes were cracked.

All Masses were subsequently transferred to the Pilgrim Center located adjacent to the basilica. On December 24, 2014, Christmas Eve, the basilica reopened while repairs were being done to the belfry and the main central doors.

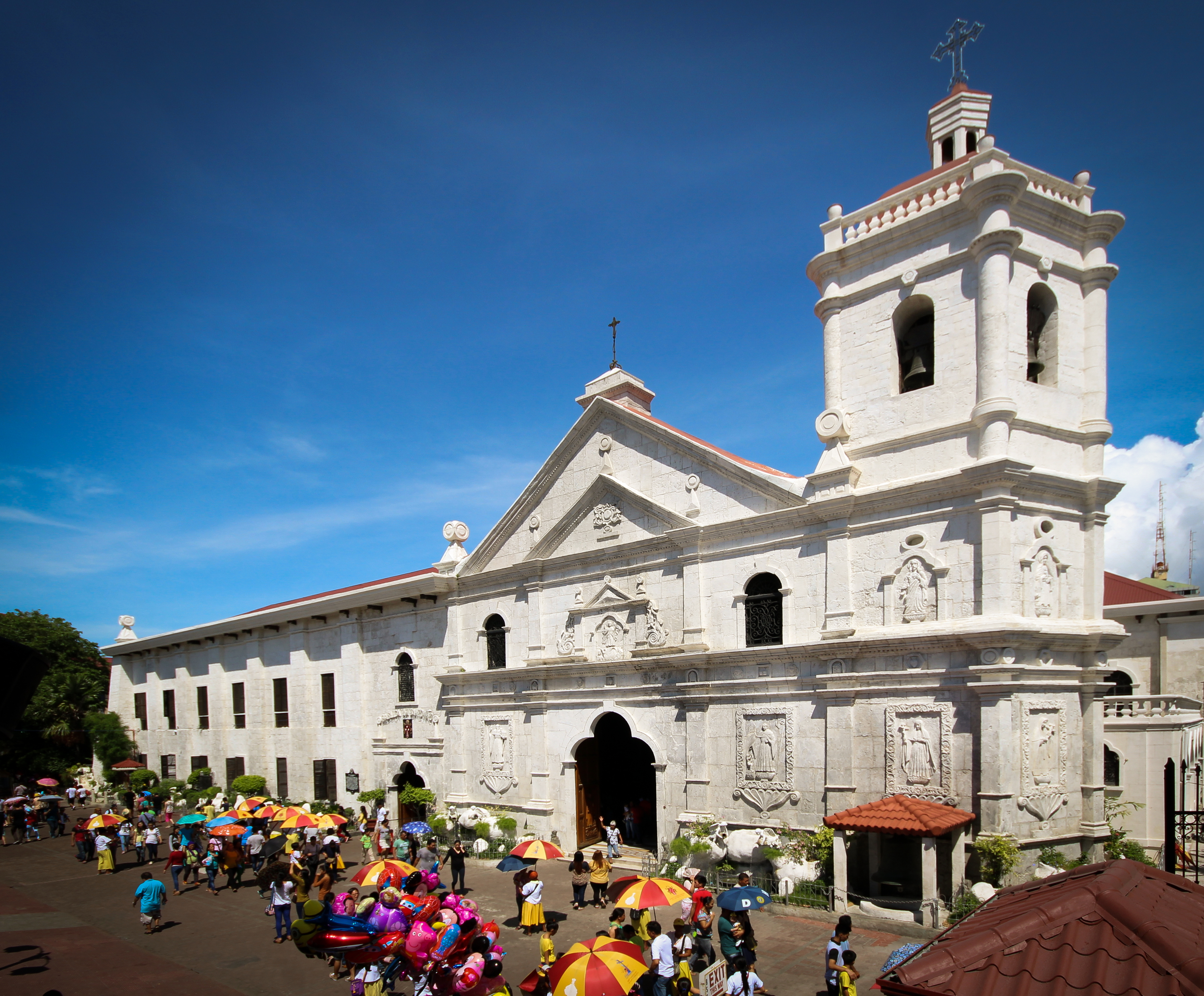
The belfry of the basilica was destroyed during a powerful earthquake that hit the province of Cebu in 2013. The National Museum of the Philippines allocated funds to completely restore the church. This photo was taken after the restoration of the church in 2016.

The restoration of the basilica was one of the 16 projects facilitated by National Historical Commission of the Philippines in Cebu province in 2015. Restoration works began in July.

Prior to restoration, the rubbles from the collapsed belfry were subjected to laboratory tests to analyze their composition to ensure that the new building materials will be compatible to the old and existing structure. During restoration, mechanical and chemical cleaning of the exterior walls were performed. Moreover, lime water were injected into the rubble core to make it stronger. The bell tower was fully restored in October 2016.

=== Heritage designations ===
The Church and Convent of Santo Niño was declared a National Historical Landmark on August 1, 1973.

On April 14, 2021, on the 500th anniversary of the first Baptism in the Philippines, the National Museum of the Philippines collectively declared the Church and Convent of Santo Niño and the Magellan's Cross Pavilion as National Cultural Treasures, as part of the quincentennial commemorations in the country.

== Church complex ==
=== Pilgrim Center ===
Pilgrim Center

The devotees kept increasing over the years and could easily fill the Basilica. To accommodate this growing number of devotees who come to hear mass in the Basilica, a pilgrim center was built within the church compound opposite of the Basilica.

Masses are usually held in the Pilgrim Center every Fridays and Sundays as well as other activities such as Novena Masses to the Sto. Niño.

Completed in September 1990, this open-air structure can accommodate 3,500 people. The basement of the Pilgrim Center houses the Basilica Del Sto. Niño Museum.

=== Museum ===
The museum was first established in 1965 by Fr. Ambrosio Galindez, O.S.A. for the purpose of the commemoration of the Fourth Centennial of the Christianization of the Philippines. It was then located at a certain room in the convent. Old church documents dating back to the 17th century, antique church furniture, antique church things (i.e. Chalice, Altar Table, Thurible, etc.), and antique vestments of the priests are in display. The old vestments of the Sto. Niño de Cebu dating back to the 17th century are also in display. The relics and statues of the different saints are also in exhibit. The replicas of the Sto. Niño used in different pilgrimages in the Philippines and abroad are displayed. Some donated jewelleries and gift toys to the Sto. Niño are in display also.

The Basilica del Sto. Niño Museum is currently located at the basement of the Pilgrim Center.

=== Basilica del Santo Niño Library ===
Originally for exclusive use by the friars, in 2000, the church library was opened to all serious nonclerical researchers. Its collection covers religious subjects and non-religious disciplines including history, science, philosophy, Filipiniana, and periodicals.

== Location ==
The Basílica Minore del Santo Niño de Cebu Basilica Complex is located in a city block bordered by Osmeña Boulevard, D. Jakosalem St, P. Burgos St. and the Plaza Sugbo where the Magellan's Cross is located. The main entrance is on Osmeña Boulevard. Two blocks north of the basilica is the Cebu Metropolitan Cathedral, the seat of the Roman Catholic Archdiocese of Cebu.

== Devotion to the Holy Child ==
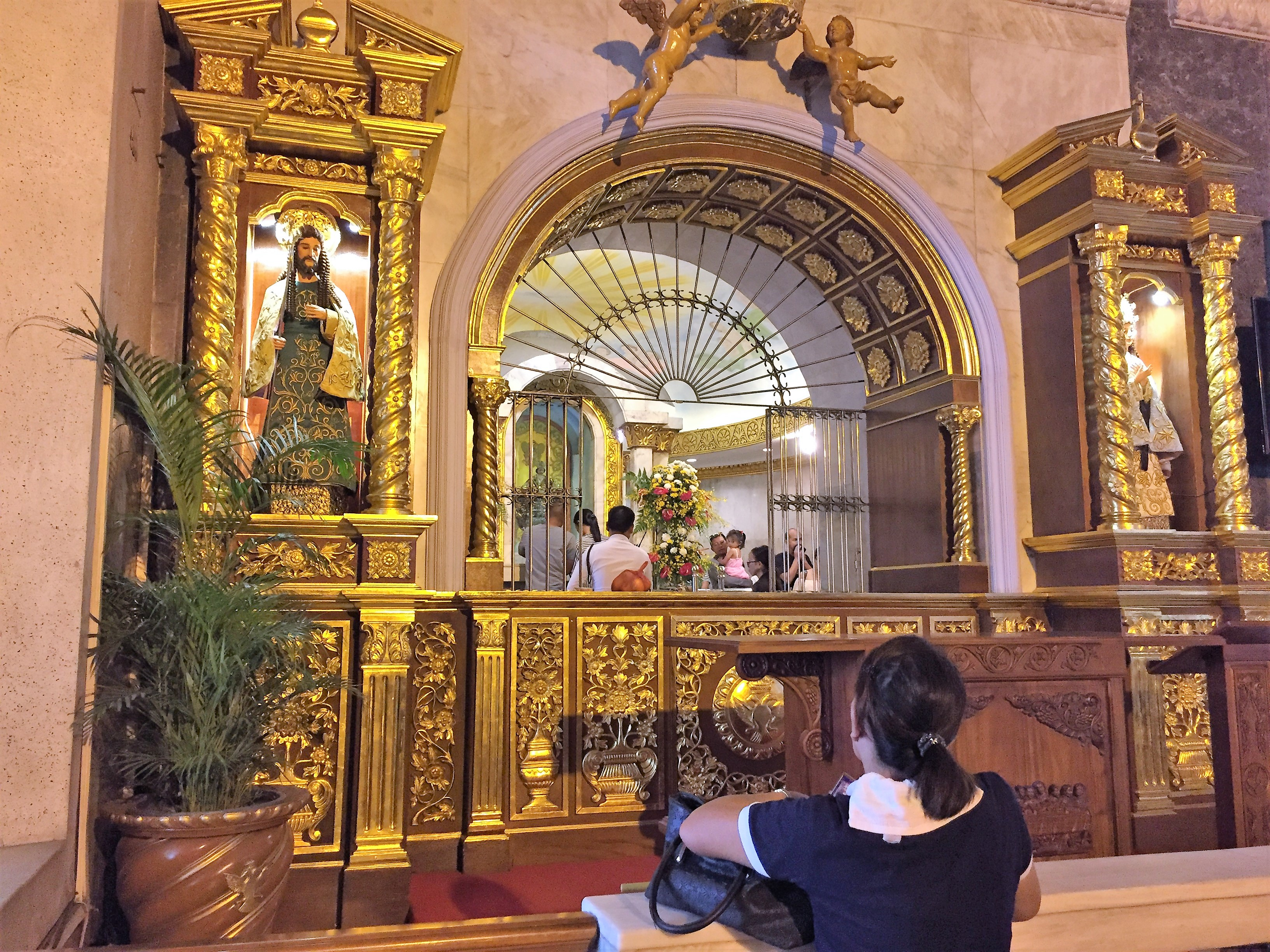
A woman praying in front of the image of the Holy Child

Devotion to the Santo Niño de Cebú is popular among Roman Catholics in Cebu, as well as nationwide. Devotees flock to the basilica to fall in line (Cebuano: linya sa hawok), for even a few hours, to see the image enshrined in a glass case. After which, some would go to the church and attend Mass. Others would go to the dagkutanan (candle area) to light their candles, while some would avail prayers to the Holy Child. The devotion to the Holy Child falls every Friday.

The Sinulog Festival is celebrated on the third Sunday of January and is marked with processions and festivities. Meanwhile, every April 28, the Kaplag ("discovery") is held, commemorating the founding and discovery of the image. Novena Masses are held before their respective festivities.

Holy Masses celebrated on Fridays, Sundays, and other Religious Festivities are held at the Pilgrim Center outside of the basilica.

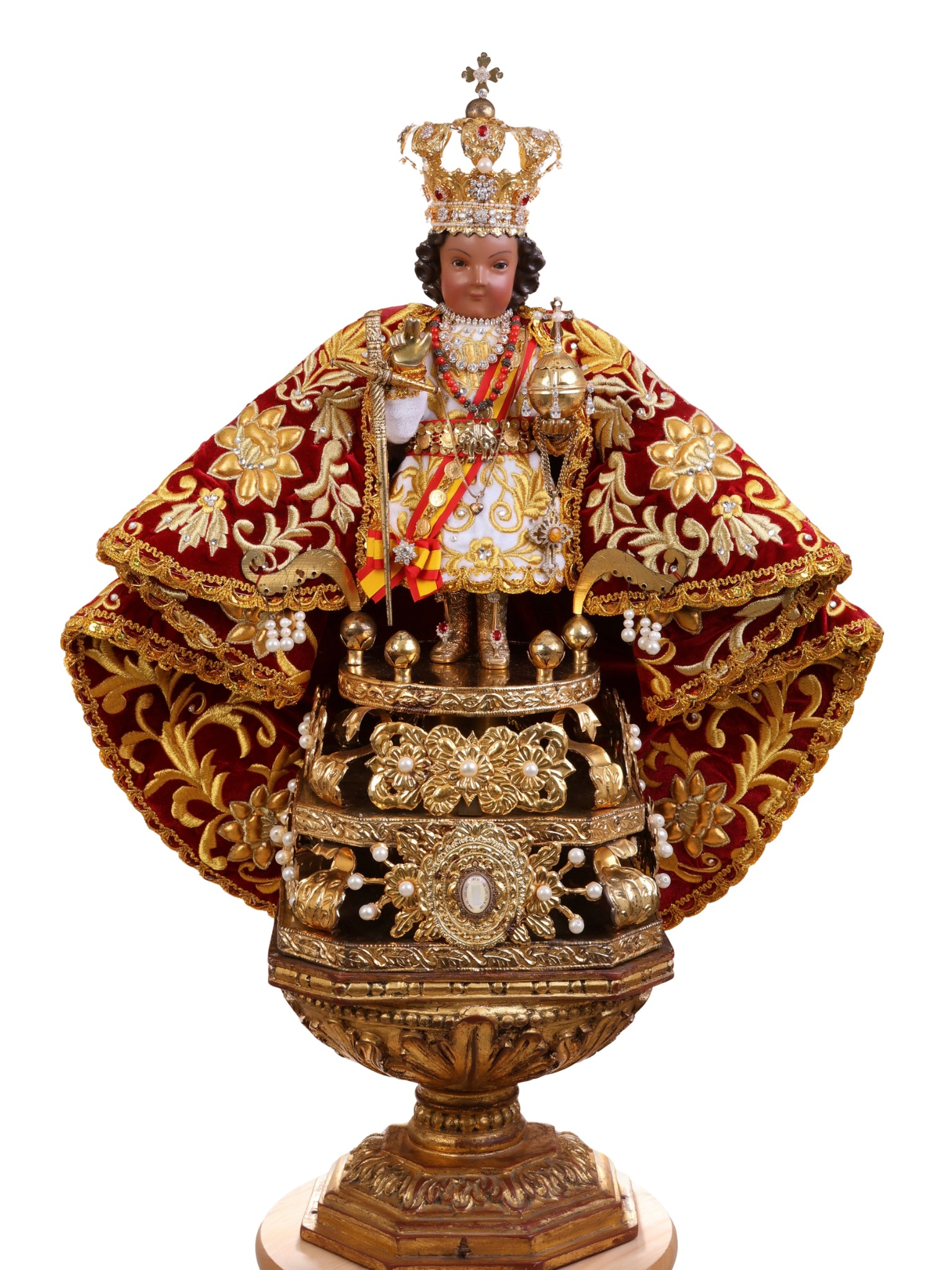
A replica of the Santo Niño de Cebu in traditional vestments and regalia

Aside from the devotion in Cebu, the Augustinian friars spread the devotion of the Holy Child to other places, which led to the establishment of other churches dedicated to the Holy Child in Tondo and Pandacan in Manila, Tacloban, and Arevalo in Iloilo City.

== Gallery ==
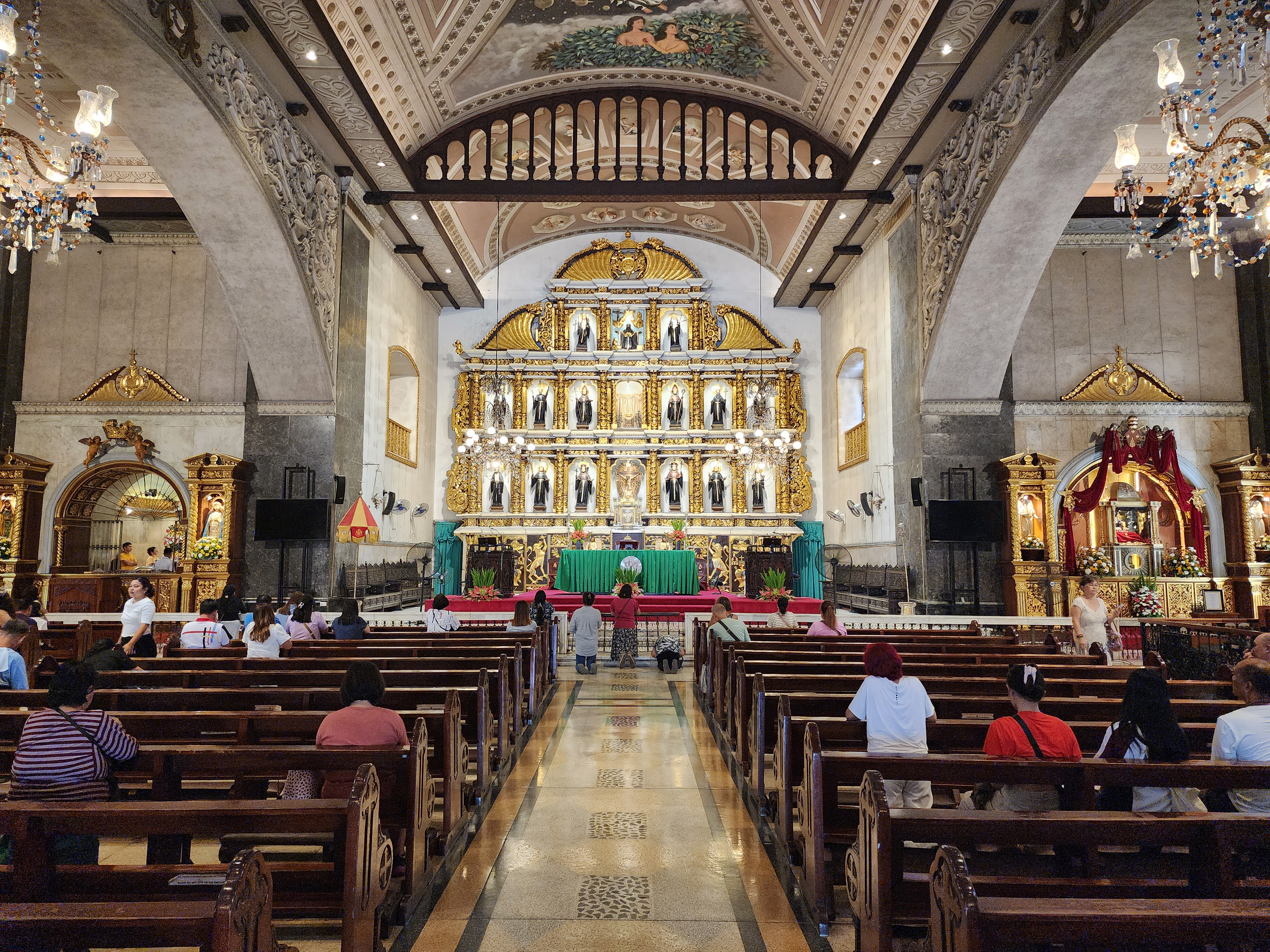
Nave and main sanctuary in 2024

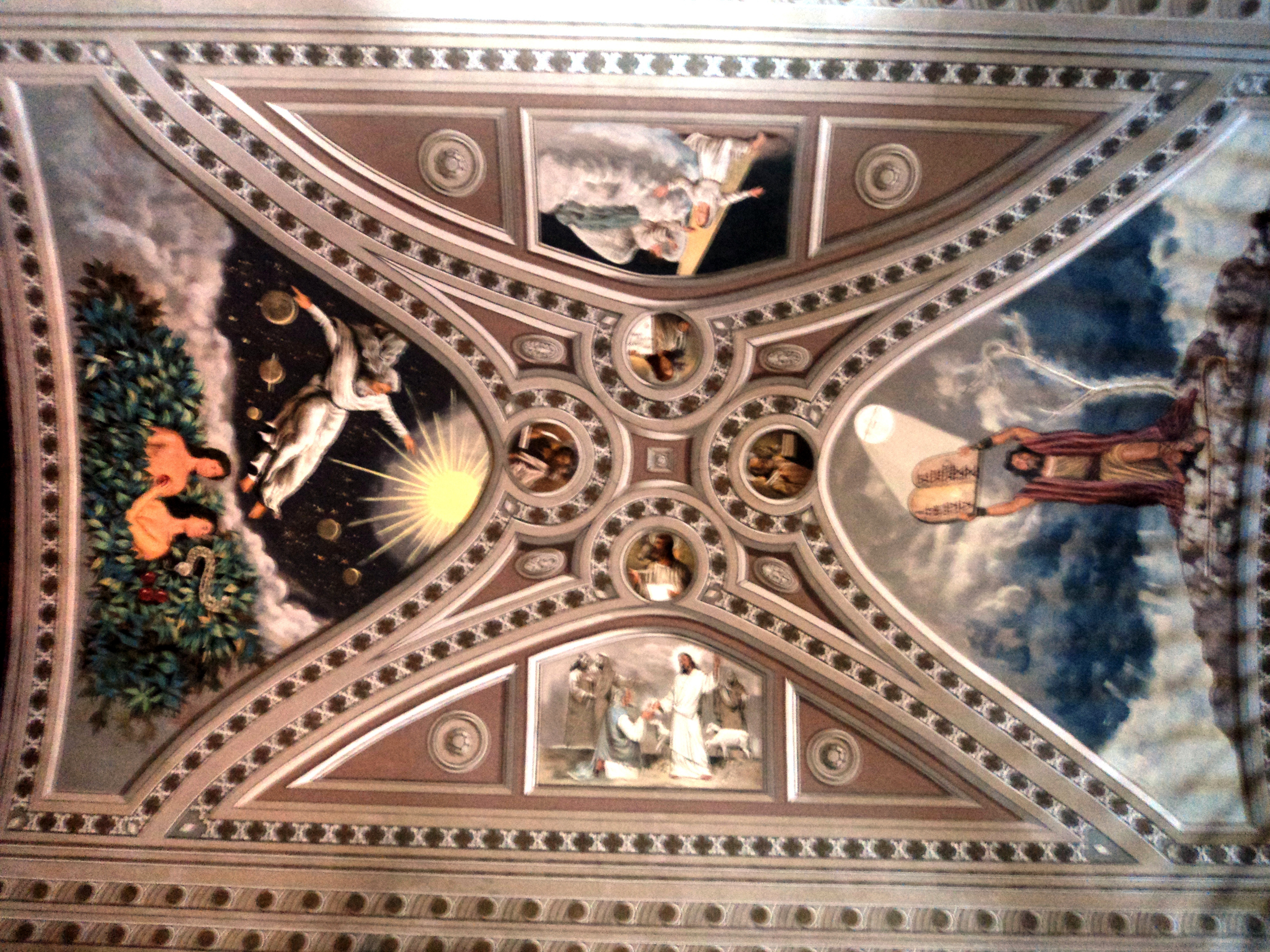
The frescoes on the basilica ceiling

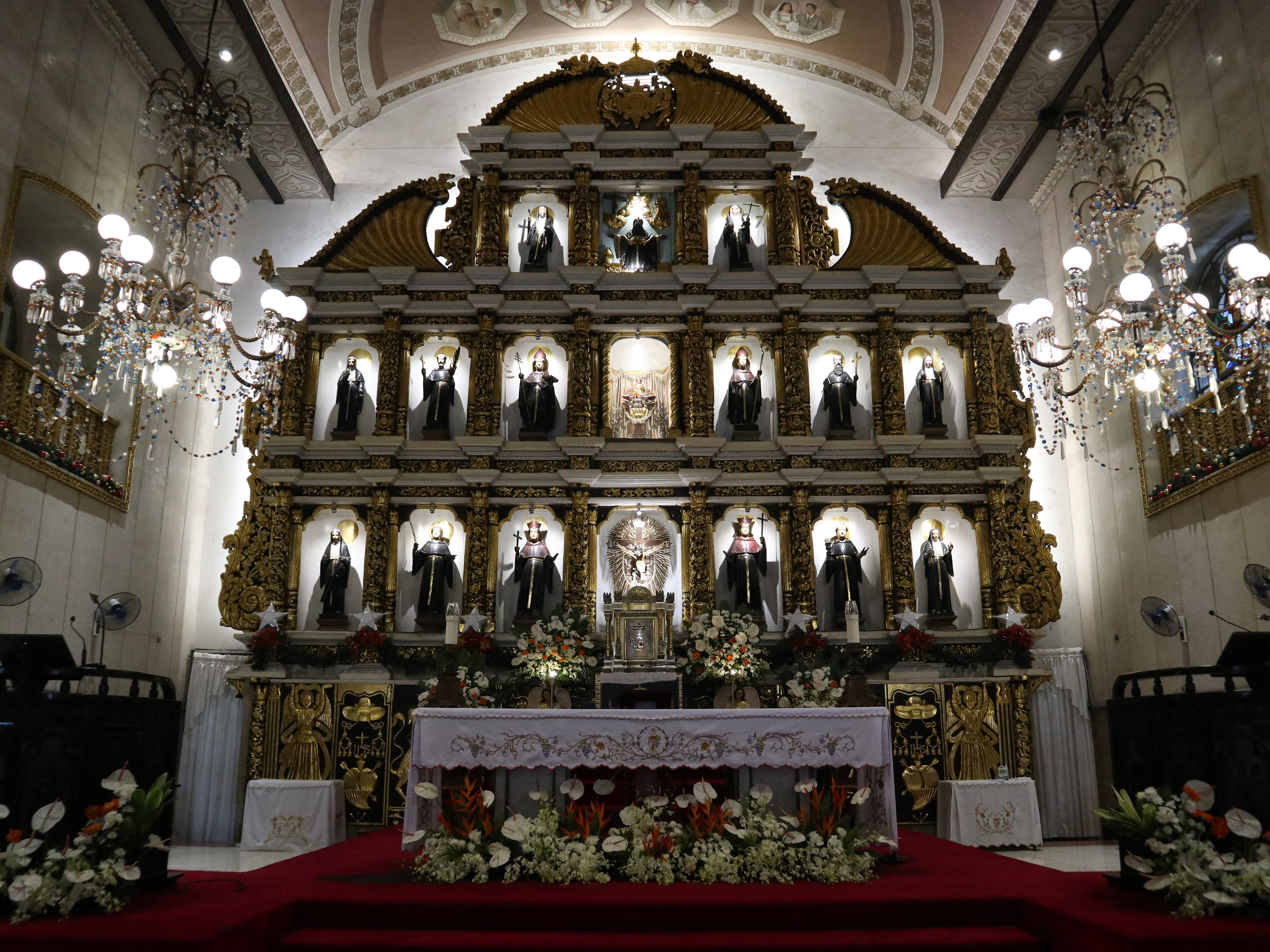
Reredos

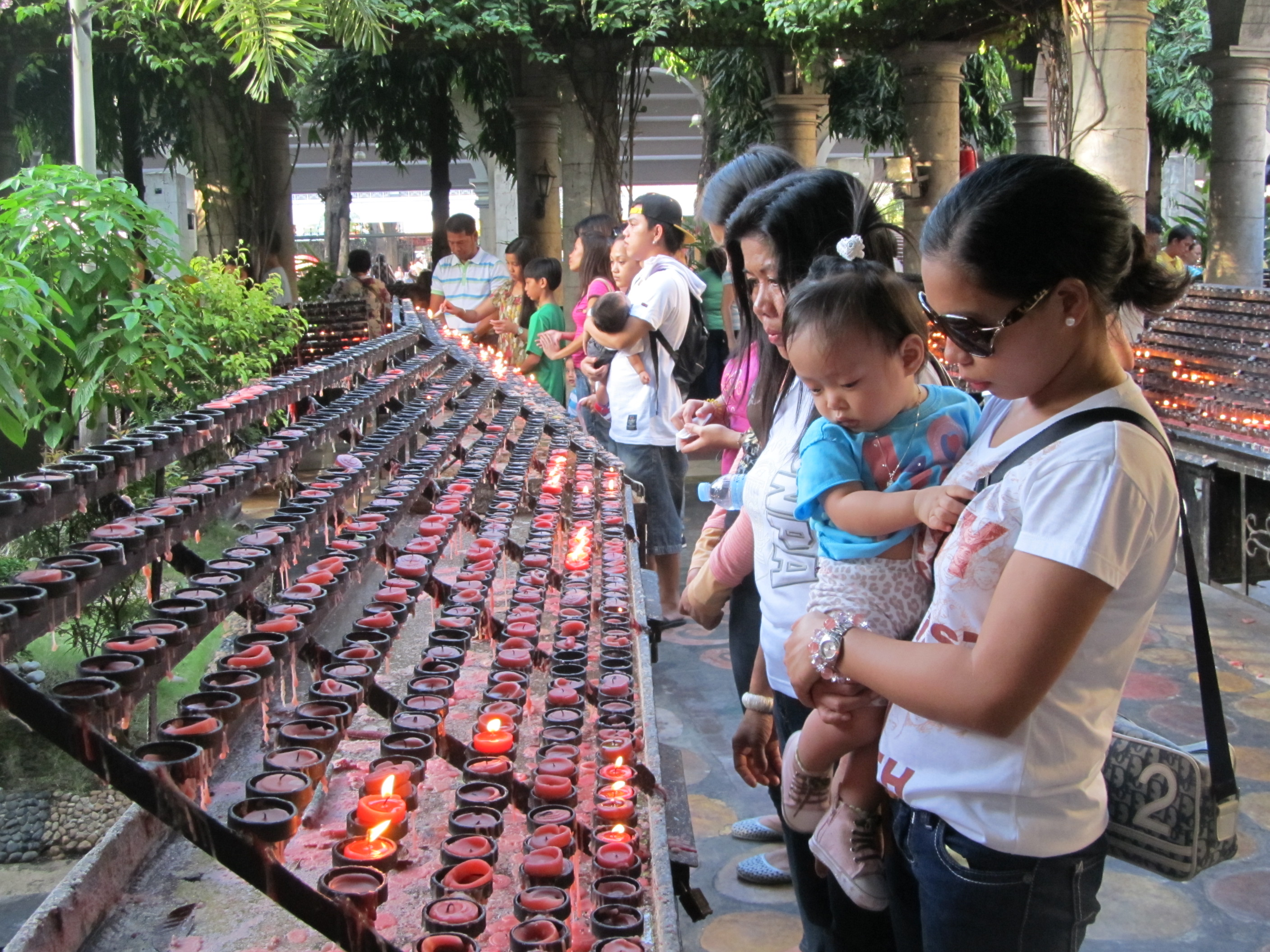
Candle lighting for prayer at the Sto. Niño Church

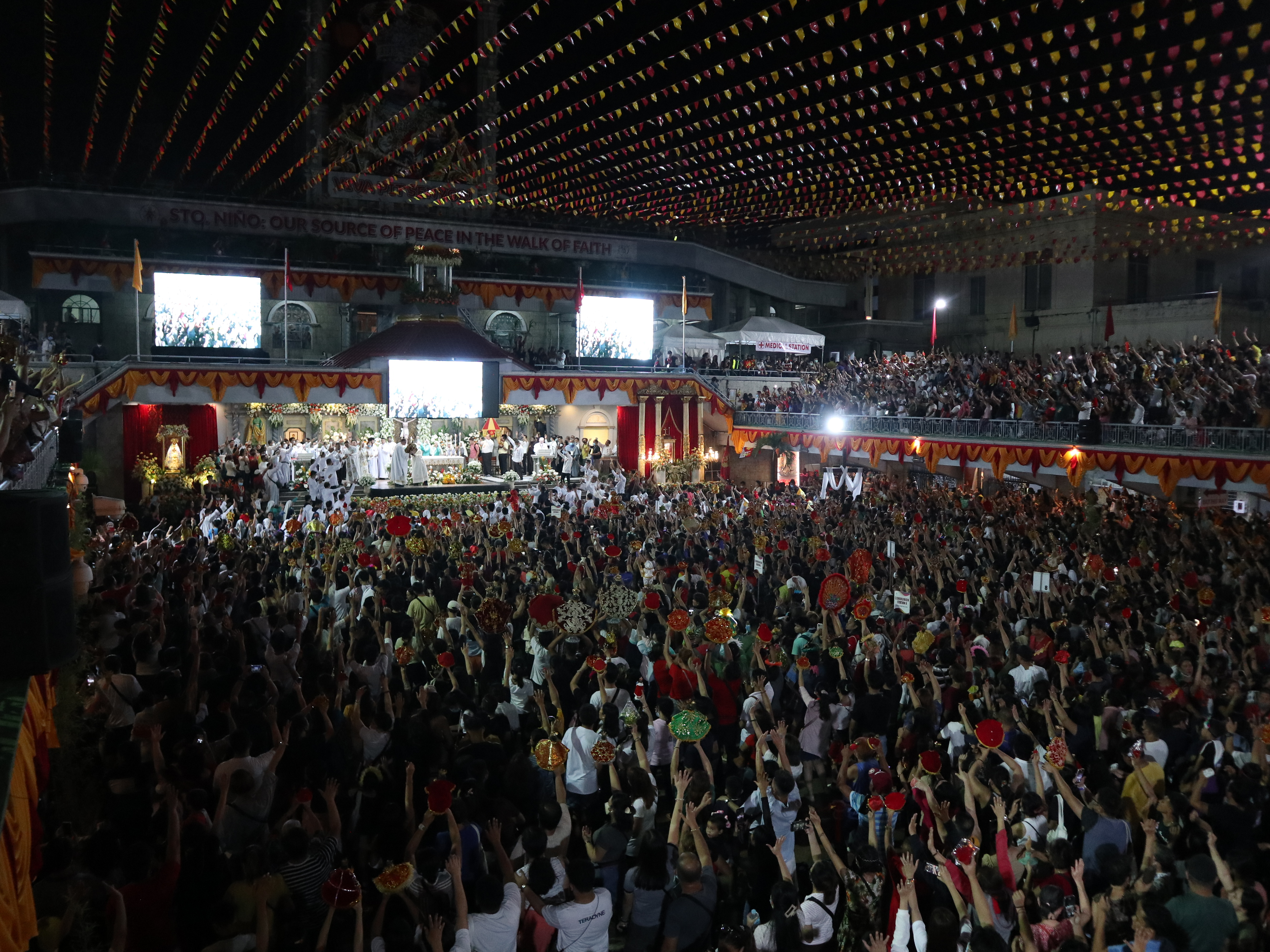
Novena Mass for the Feast of Santo Niño celebrated at the Pilgrim Center in front of the Basilica

== See also ==
=== Other Santo Niño churches and titles ===
- Tondo Church — dedicated to Santo Niño de Tondo
- Pandacan Church — dedicated to Santo Niño de Pandacan
- Santo Niño Church (Tacloban) — dedicated to Santo Niño de Tacloban
- Minor Basilica of the Immaculate Conception — a minor basilica in Batangas City also dedicated to a Holy Child image, the Santo Niño de Batangan
- Santo Niño de Arévalo — an image in Arevalo, Iloilo City

=== Related ===
- List of Catholic basilicas
- Roman Catholic Archdiocese of Cebu
- Catholic Church in the Philippines
