= Magellan's Cross Pavilion =

Stone kiosk in Cebu City, Philippines

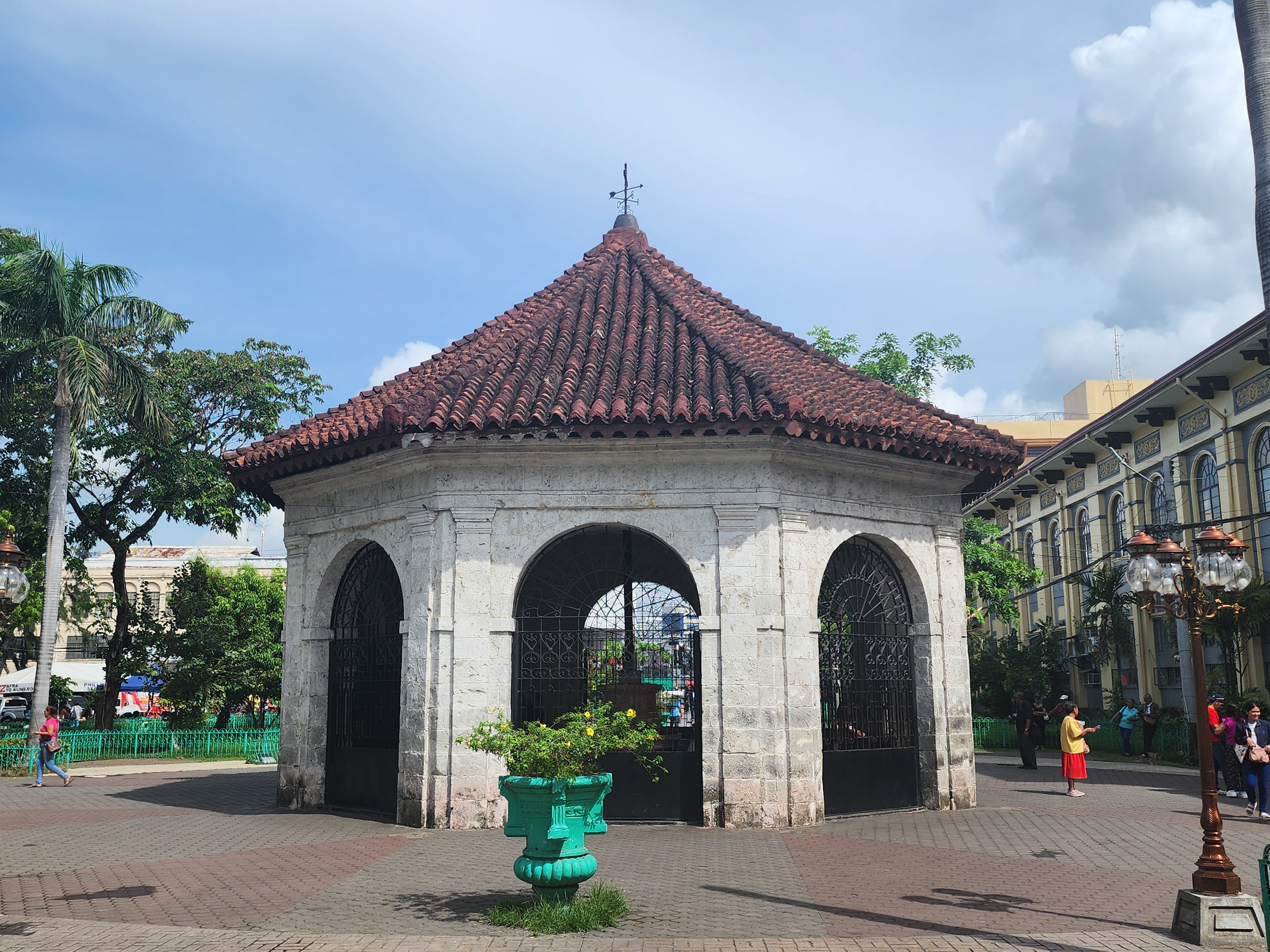
- Magellan's Cross Pavilion in July 2024

- Location within Cebu, Philippines Location within Visayas Location within Philippines

Religion
- Affiliation: Catholic
- Province: Cebu

Location
- Location: Plaza Sugbo, Cebu City
- Country: Philippines
- Coordinates: 10°17′37″N 123°54′07″E

Architecture
- Completed: 1834
- Materials: Coral stone

National Cultural Treasures
- Designated: April 14, 2021
- Region: Central Visayas

Magellan's Cross Pavilion is a stone kiosk in Cebu City, Philippines. The structure is situated on Plaza Sugbo beside the Basilica del Santo Niño. It houses a Christian cross that was planted by explorers of the Spanish expedition of the first circumnavigation of the world, led by Ferdinand Magellan, upon arriving in Cebu in the Philippines on April 21, 1521.

Along with the Basilica del Santo Niño's church and convent buildings, the pavilion is a declared National Cultural Treasure of the Philippines.

== Background ==
=== Pavilion ===
The Magellan's Cross Pavilion which houses the tindalo cross was built sometime in the 1834 under Spanish colonial rule. The structure is octagonal kiosk made of coral stone.

The pavilion and the tindalo cross itself sustained cracks in the 2013 Bohol earthquake. The original cross was also found to have deteriorated due to termites in 2015. The pavilion was closed for renovations and was reopened in March 2016.

On the ceiling of the pavilion's interior, is a mural depicting the baptism of Rajah Humabon and his household by Fr. Pedro Valderrama and the planting of a wooden cross by Ferdinand Magellan. The artwork was done by Jess Roa and Serry M. Josol.

The Pavilion is currently closed to the general public once more until further notice due to cracks sustained during the 2025 Cebu earthquake. The public, however, is allowed to pray outside the pavilion and to place Sinug candles inside the pavilion through the entrances and windows. Personnels and staff from the Basilica are allowed to enter the pavilion to collect the accumulated candles.

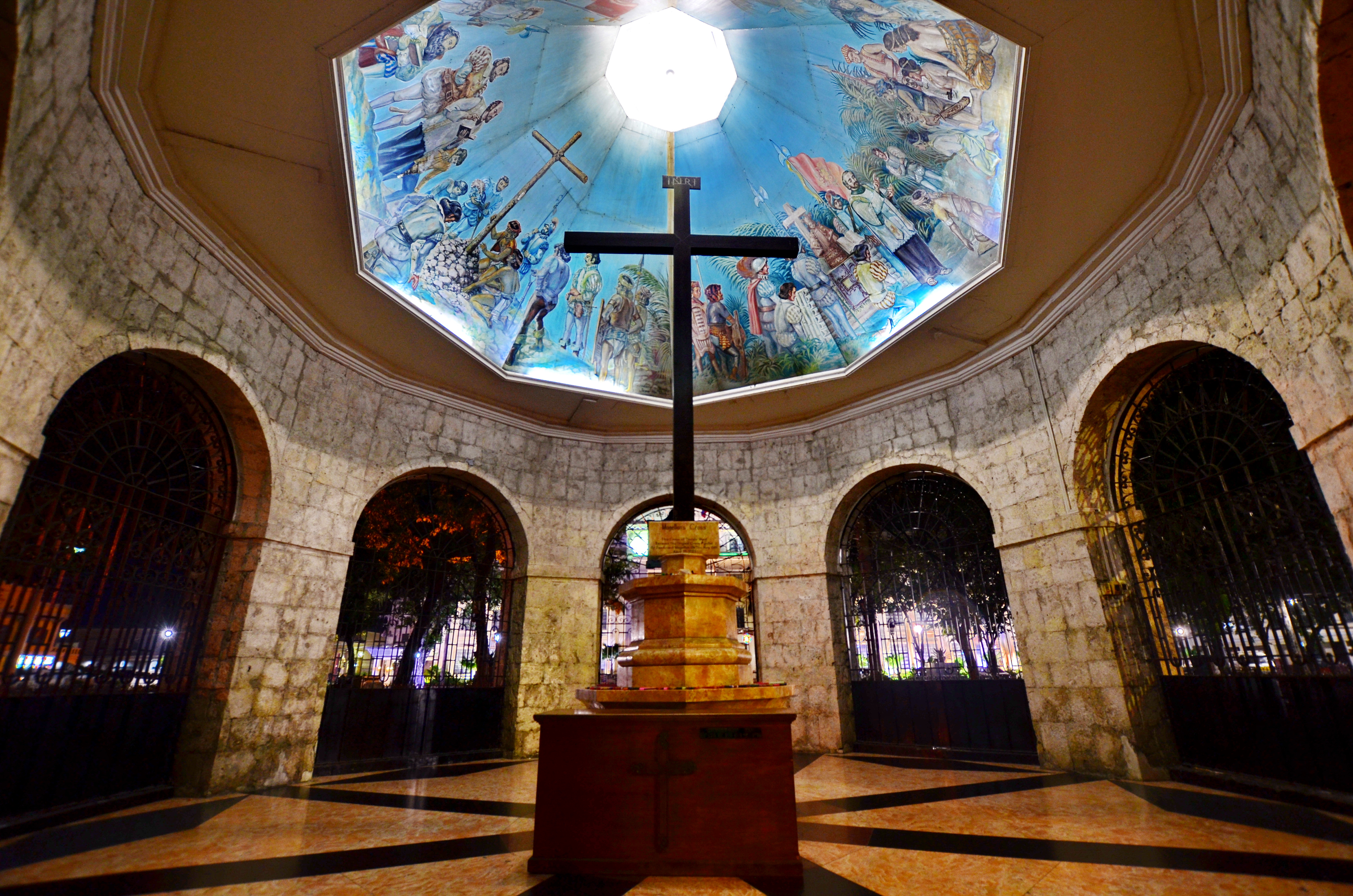
Pavilion interior

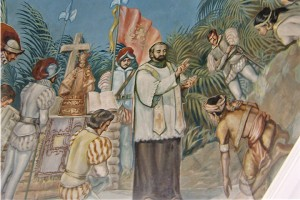
The baptism of Carlos and Juana with a statue of the Santo Niño behind Pedro de Valderrama.

=== Cross ===
The Magellan's Cross refers to the original wooden cross planted by explorers of the Spanish expedition of the first circumnavigation of the world, led by Ferdinand Magellan, upon arriving in Cebu on April 21, 1521.

The original cross was encased inside another cross of tindalo wood in 1835. This was done to protect the original cross from people who chipped off pieces in the belief these have miraculous powers.

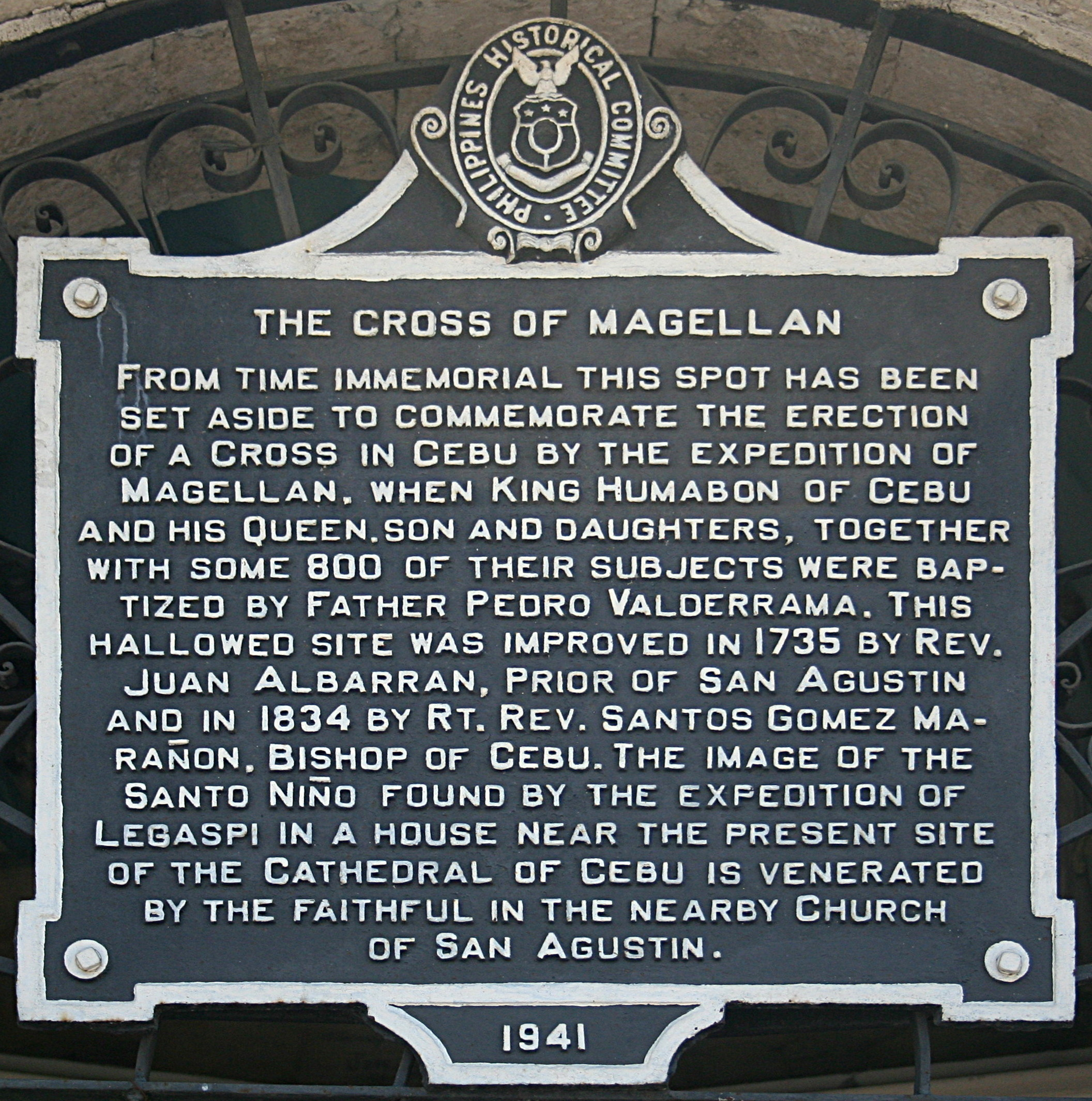
Historical marker installed in 1941 to commemorate the cross

The cross was named as the "2021 Jubilee Cross" as part of the 2021 Quincentennial Commemorations in the Philippines.

== Designation ==
The pavilion along with the Basilica del Santo Niño Church and Convent were collectively declared as a National Cultural Treasure by the National Museum of the Philippines on April 14, 2021.
