= Santo Niño de Cebú =

Title of the Child Jesus in the Catholic Church

Señor Santo Niño de Cebú
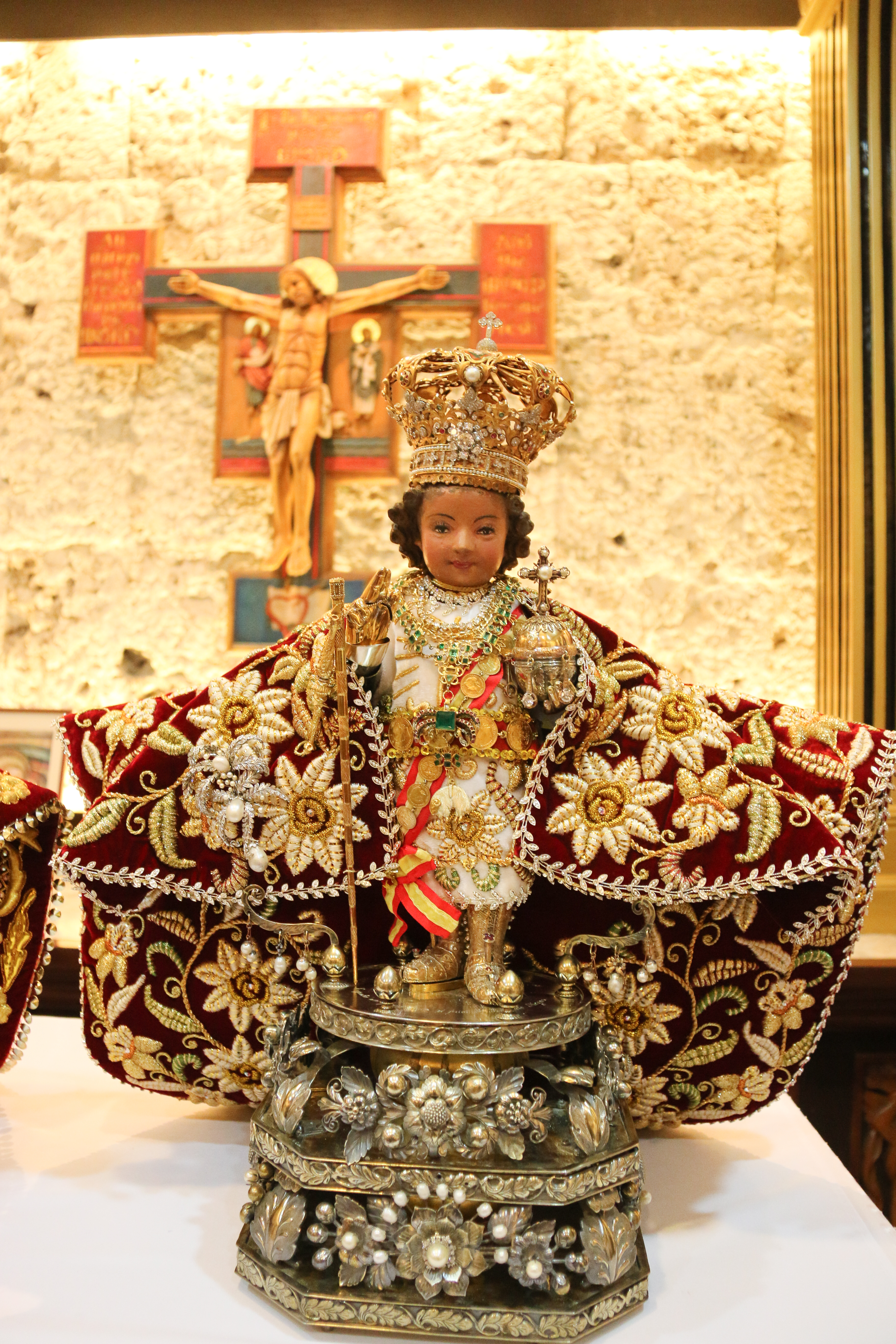
- Original image of Señor Santo Niño de Cebú
- Location: Cebu City, Philippines
- Date: April 28, 1565
- Witness: Ferdinand Magellan; Antonio Pigafetta; Rajah Humabon
- Type: Wooden statue
- Approval: Pope Innocent XIII; Pope Paul VI; Pope John Paul II; Pope Francis
- Venerated in: Catholic Church
- Shrine: Basilica del Santo Niño
- Attributes: Crown, sceptre, globus cruciger, dark skin, embroidered maroon mantle, gold boots, sash, toisón de oro
- Feast day: Third Sunday in January

The Señor Santo Niño de Cebú (lit. 'Lord Holy Child of Cebu'), or simply the Santo Niño, is a Catholic title of the Child Jesus associated with a religious image widely venerated as miraculous by Filipino Catholics. It is the oldest Christian artifact in the Philippines, originally given as a gift by Ferdinand Magellan to Rajah Humabon and his wife and chief consort, Hara Humamay, on the occasion of their Christian baptism in 1521. The image is the only canonically crowned image of Jesus in the Philippines.

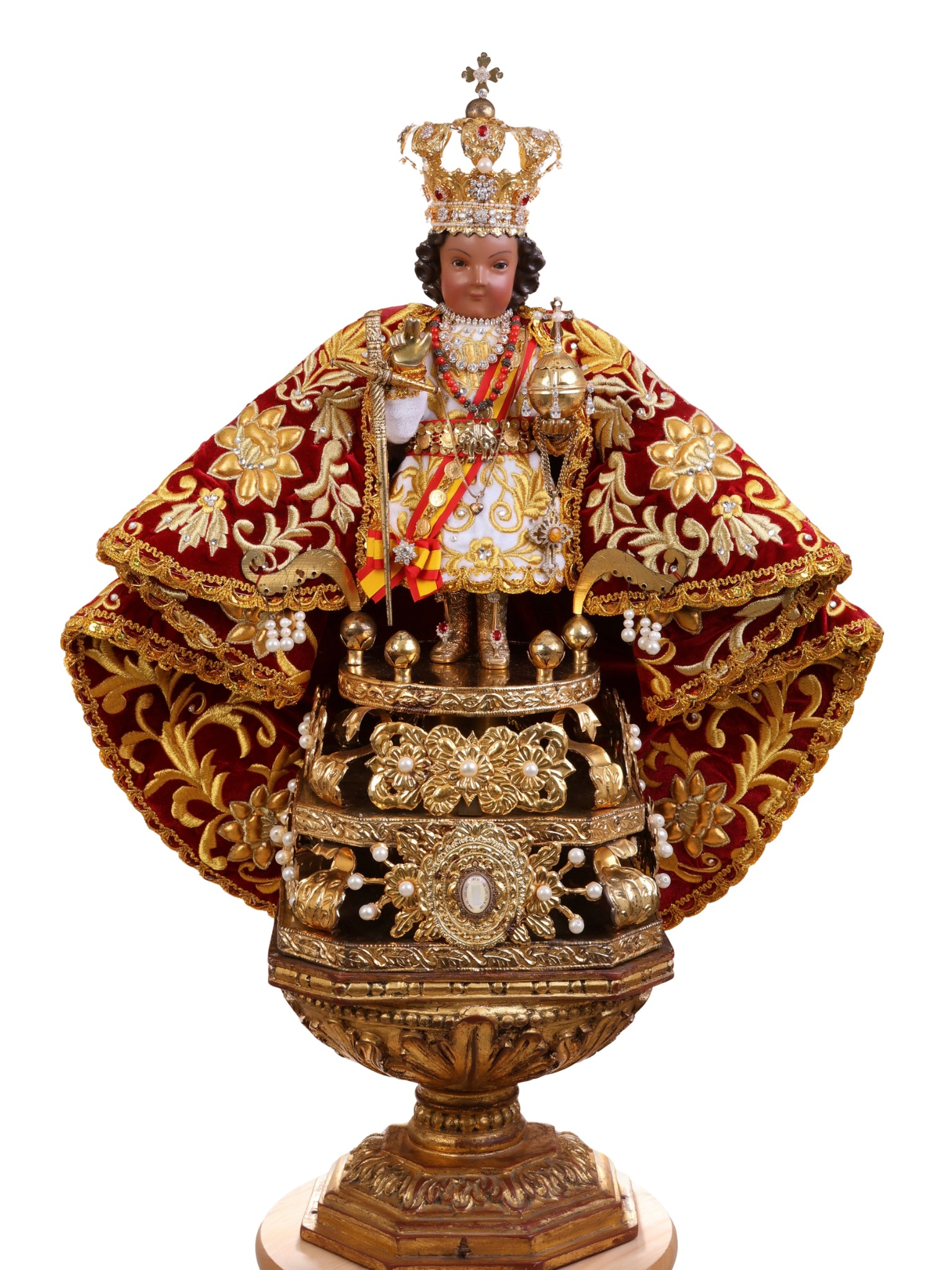
A replica of the Santo Niño de Cebú in traditional vestments and regalia

== Description ==
The dark wood statue measures approximately 12 inches (30 cm) tall, and carved in the Flemish style. It depicts the Child Jesus, with a serene countenance, in the attitude and dress of a Spanish monarch. The statue bears imperial regalia, including a golden crown, Toisón de oro, globus cruciger, and various sceptres, wears fine vestments, and possesses jewelry mostly offered by devotees over several centuries.

The image is replicated in various parts of the country with different titles, and the Christ Child has become one of the most beloved and recognizable Filipino cultural icons. The annual dancing feast of Sinulog is held on the third Sunday of January every year in His honor. Today, the original image is permanently encased behind bulletproof glass inside its chapel within the Basilica del Santo Niño.

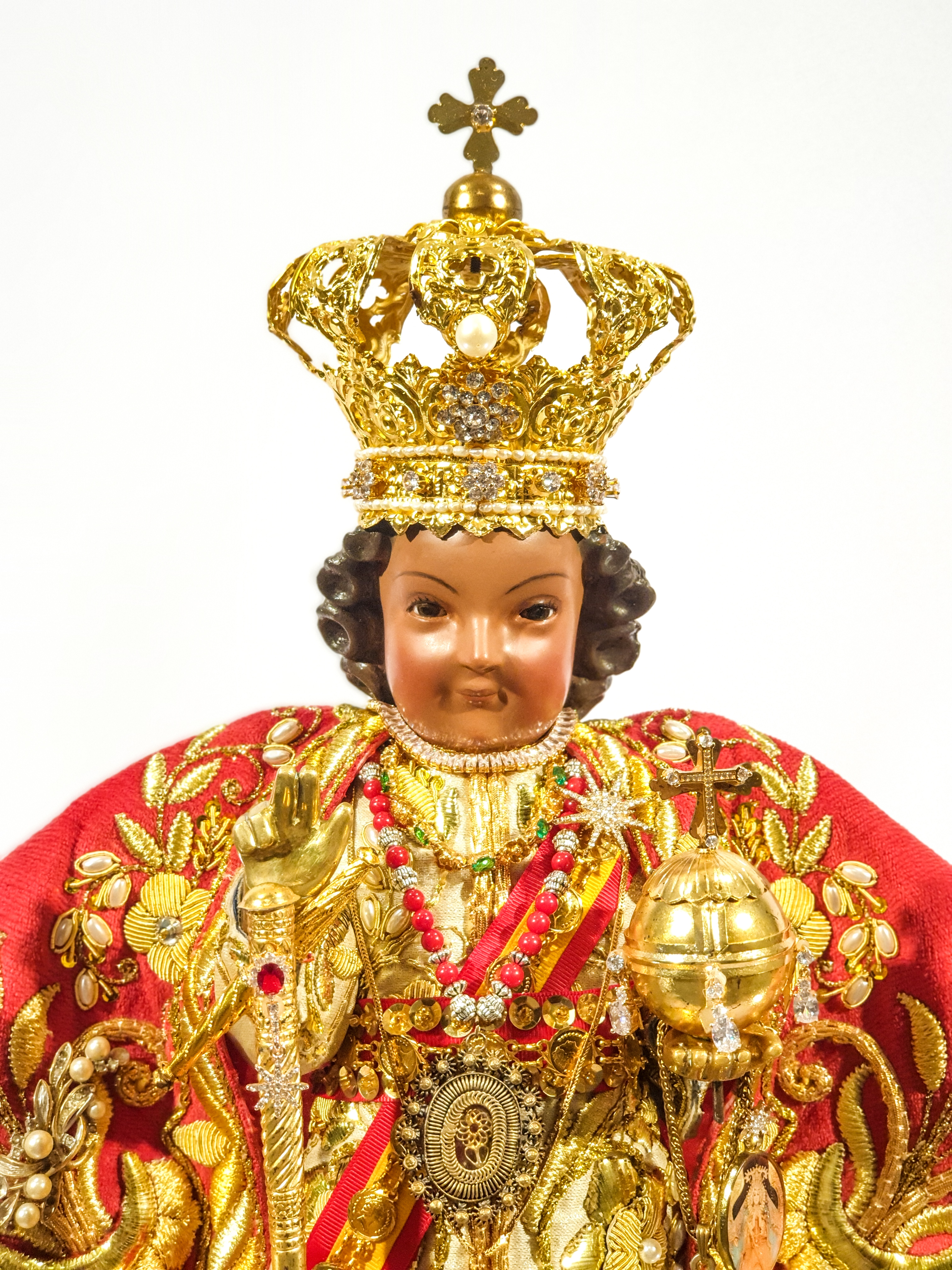
A replica of the image of the Santo Niño de Cebú.

== History ==
The Santo Niño de Cebú was originally produced by Flemish artisans, according to a hagiography, based on a vision of Teresa of Ávila, the 16th century Discalced Carmelite mystic.

In early 1521, a Spanish expedition ordered by Holy Roman Emperor Charles V and led by Ferdinand Magellan was on a voyage from Spain to find a westward route to the Spice Islands. After crossing the Atlantic and Pacific Oceans, on April 7, 1521, they landed in Limasawa, Southern Leyte, and met a local ruler named Raja Kulambu, who introduced him to Rajah Humabon, ruler of Cebu Island, and his chief consort, Hara Humamay. On April 14, Magellan presented them with three gifts: a bust of Christ as the Ecce Homo, an image of the Blessed Virgin Mary, and the Santo Niño as part of their baptism and strategic alliance.

As Humabon adopted the Catholic faith, he took the Christian name of "Carlos", after Charles I. Humamay was christened "Juana", after Joanna of Castile, Charles' mother. According to Antonio Pigafetta – Magellan's memoir writer, along with the ruler, about 500 males along with the Queen and 40 women were also converted by Father Pedro Valderrama. At the ceremony, Raja Kulambu of Limasawa also converted and was given the name Don "Juan", while his Muslim captain was named Don "Cristobal".

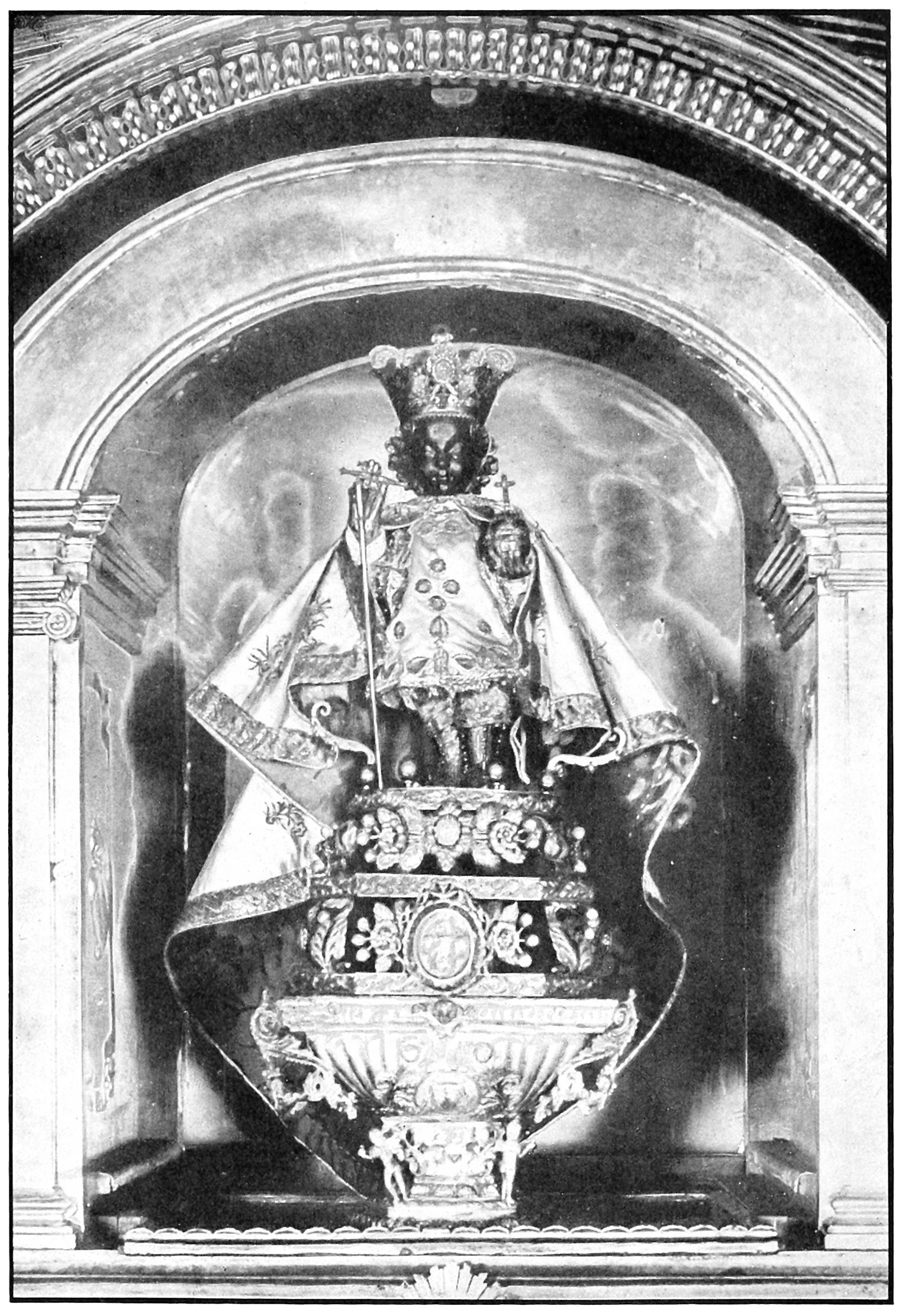
A photograph of the original image of Santo Niño de Cebu from 1903. The image originally had a very dark complexion pre-World War II, which has been removed to reveal a much fairer skin tone.

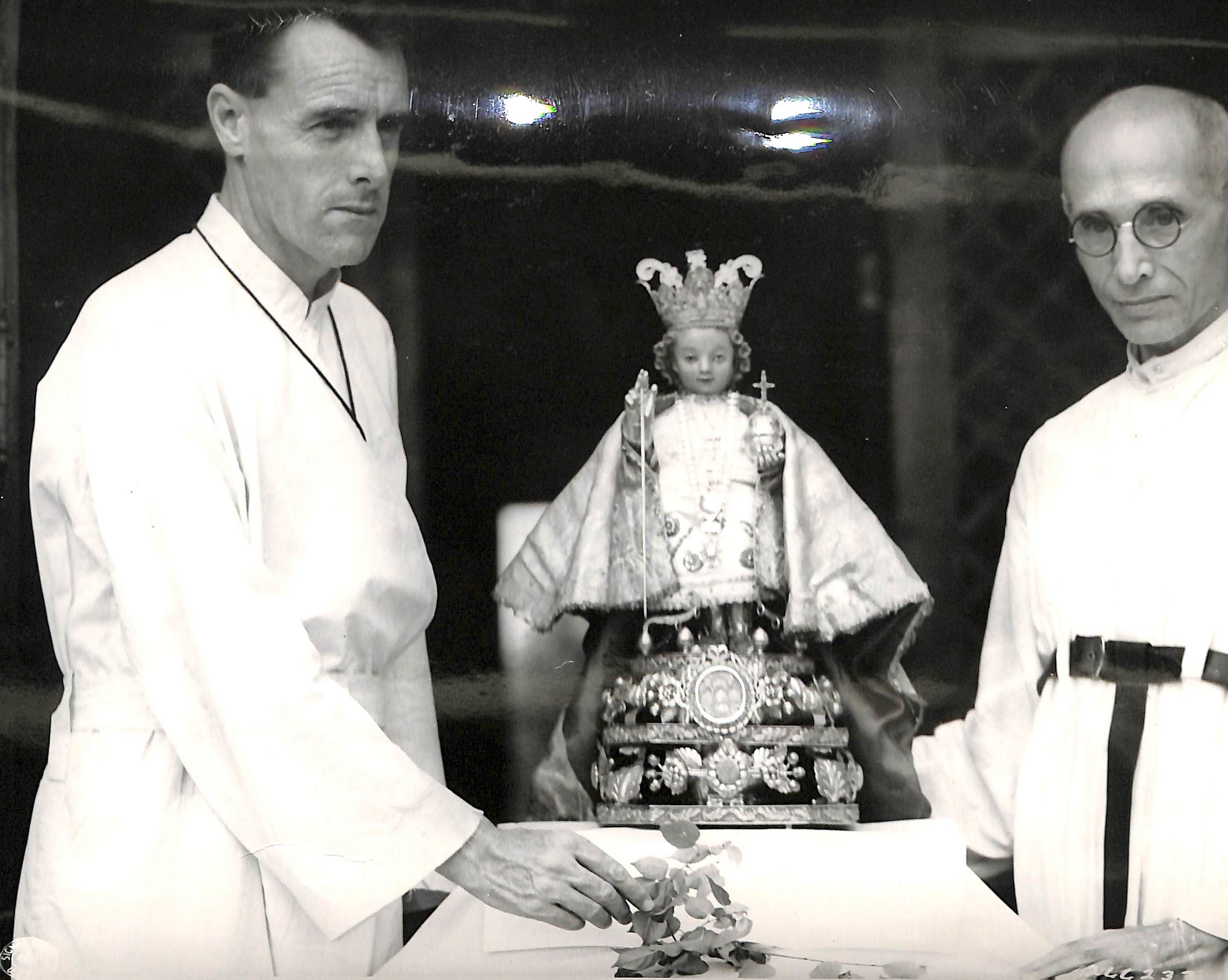
A photograph of the original image of Santo Niño de Cebu post-World War II, with its lighter skin tone after the dark paint was peeled off.

A few days after the mass baptism, Magellan undertook a war expedition on the behalf of the newly named King Carlos, attacking Mactan Island and burning down hamlets which resisted. The residents, led by Lapu-Lapu, defended against Magellan’s attack with force, and Magellan died on April 27 during the Battle of Mactan, about three weeks after he arrived in the Philippines. After Magellan's death, his Spanish colleagues left. The image of Christ was left behind but the locals still worshiped it, but in the native manner, a rite known as the Sinulog.

The next Spanish expedition arrived on April 27, 1565, led by Miguel López de Legazpi, again to gain a foothold for a colony to trade spices. He attempted a peaceful colonization, but these efforts were rejected. As a result, he opened fire on Cebu and burnt the coastal town down destroying 1,500 homes and possibly killing 500 people. In the ruins of this destruction, on April 28, the Spanish mariner Juan Camus found the image of the Santo Niño in a pine box. According to the local legend, the survival of the statue was seen as a sign of miracle by the colonizers, and ever since it has been believed to have miraculous powers.

The image of the Santo Niño is the oldest surviving Catholic relic in the Philippines, along with Magellan's Cross. A church to house Santo Niño was built on the spot where the image was found by Juan Camus. The church was originally made of bamboo and nipa palm, and is thought to be the oldest in the Philippines. The structure was destroyed several times and was finally rebuilt as a permanent structure using coral stone, which is the present basilica.

During World War II, Japanese forces bombed all of Cebu, including the basilica. A bomb fell in the church and greatly damaged the roof but, miraculously, did not explode. When Augustinian friars inspected the immediate aftermath, they found the Santo Niño had been hurled from the high altar, and was dangling by its cape caught on a nearby electric candle. After seeing the image displaced from the altar with the rest of the church in great disrepair, and for fear of more bombings in the vicinity, the friars decided to flee.

They sought refuge with the Redemptorist brothers at the Parish of Our Lady of Perpetual Help, (known locally as “Redemptorist Church”), and the friars hid the image in a metal vault beneath the icon of Our Lady for seven months. After the war, the friars removed the image from the vault for public veneration, and discovered its dark paint peeling off, revealing a lighter underpainting. The image was venerated with this fair complexion for some time, until it was repainted with a more brown complexion.

Pope Paul VI elevated the church to the rank of Minor Basilica on its 400th anniversary (Spanish: Basílica Menor del Santo Niño). As part of the Culmination for the 400th Commemoration of the Christianization of the Philippines, the image of the Santo Niño was canonically crowned. The basilica was declared a National Cultural Treasure of the Philippines as one of the highlights of the celebration of the 500 Years of Christianity in the Philippines and the 2021 Quincentennial Commemorations in the Philippines.

== Name ==
The name "Santo Niño" was taken from the Spanish words santo ("holy") and niño ("child"). This Christological title is thus translated in Philippine English as "Holy Child".

In the Spanish translation of the New International Version, Luke 1:35 (the Annunciation of Mary) reads:

"Y el ángel dijo: —El Espíritu Santo vendrá sobre ti y el poder del Altísimo te cubrirá con su sombra. Así que al Santo Niño que va a nacer lo llamarán Hijo de Dios."

In the King James Version, the title "Holy Child" is also used for Jesus even after his Ascension.

"By stretching forth thine hand to heal; and that signs and wonders may be done by the name of thy holy child Jesus." (Acts 4:30)

== Feast ==
Feast of the Santo Niño
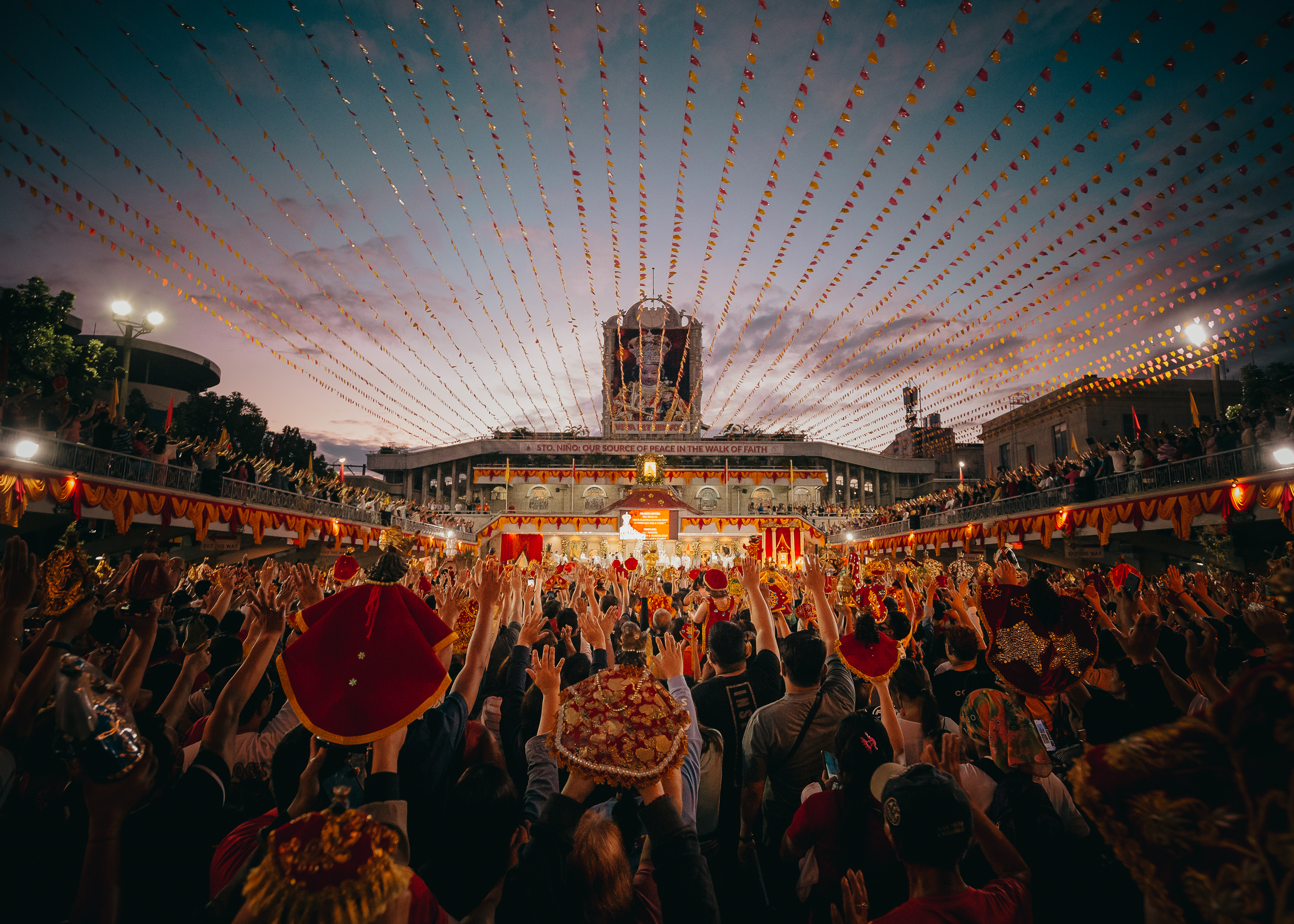
- Devotees flock to the Basílica Menor del Santo Niño during the novena masses.
- Observed by: Philippines
- Liturgical color: White
- Type: Religious / Cultural
- Date: Third Sunday in January
- 2025 date: January 19
- 2026 date: January 18
- 2027 date: January 17
- 2028 date: January 16
- Frequency: Annual
- Related to: Sinulog, Dinagyang, Ati-Atihan

The feast, locally known as Fiesta Señor, starts on the Thursday after the Solemnity of the Epiphany. The annual celebration starts with a dawn procession of a replica, followed by a novena Masses (i.e., held for nine days).

On the ninth day of the novena, another dawn procession is held wherein the image of Nuestra Señora de Guadalupe de Cebú is removed from its shrine and brought to the Basílica Menor. After the procession, it stays there until it travels with the Santo Niño de Cebú to the National Shrine of St. Joseph in Mandaue City. Both images are reunited with the icon of the church's namesake to form the Holy Family. This solemn transfer, common to fiestas throughout the country, is called a Traslación. This particular custom began on January 19, 1989, and beginning in 2024 the statue of Saint Joseph joins the other images for the fluvial procession to Cebu City.

On the morning of the vísperas ("eve", i.e., the day before) held the Saturday of January, the images of Santo Niño de Cebú and Nuestra Señora de Guadalupe de Cebú are returned to Cebu City in a fluvial procession that ends with a reenactment of the first Mass, wedding and baptism in the nation, held at the Pilgrim Center. Traditional dance performances of the city's communities follow, such as those of the Mabolo district with their older form of the Sinulog called the sinug, displaying warlike steps and dressed as Spanish conquerors, Cebuanos of the 1560s, and Muslims.

It is then followed by a grand yet solemn foot procession in the afternoon, ending in a Pontifical Mass concelebrated by local bishops and priests. The grand Sinulog Festival is then held the next day, Sunday.

=== The Hubò rite ===
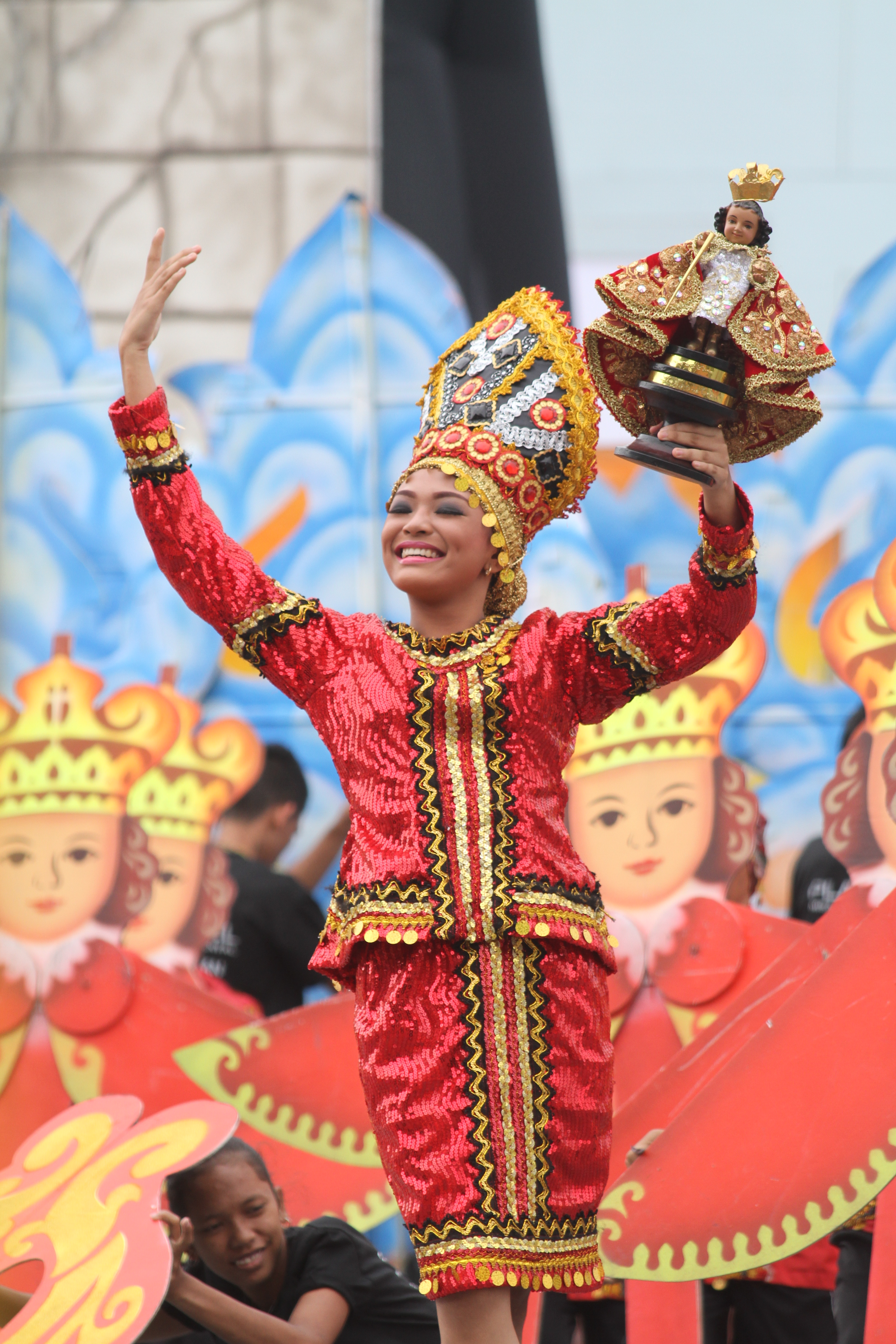
The Sinulog procession includes dancing and fiesta to revere Santo Niño. Above, a Sinulog dancer carries a copy of the statue.

The festival officially ends on the Friday after the Holy Child's feast day, and it is marked with the traditional Hubò (Cebuano, "undress") rite. During a Mass, the basilica's priests and sacristans ceremoniously and reverently strip the Santo Niño of its festal vestments and regalia.

There is a strict order of divesting the icon: first the crown is removed, followed by the orb and sceptre; then the cape; then the sash and tunic, and finally, the undergarments. The priest recites a short petition before each removal, which is marked with a festive drum roll. The priest then chants “Christe exaudi nos” (Latin, “Christ, graciously hear us”), taken from the Litany of the Saints.

The priest then raises the icon for veneration, carefully dips it in a basin of scented water four times, and wipes it dry. He then dresses it in a plainer set of robes, and replaces the regalia in reverse order of divestment. Upon replacing each item, he intones a prayer and leads the congregation in singing the refrain of the Laudes Regiæ: “Christus Vincit; Christus Regnat; Christus, Christus Imperat” (“Christ Conquers; Christ Reigns; Christ Commands”). Drum rolls then announce when the insignia are placed.

The rite is explained as highlighting Christ's humility, and on the part of the individual believer, as inspiring an internal, spiritual conversion. It was only in 1990 when the Augustinian priests caring for the icon first made this rite public. The Hubò Mass is now held on the Friday after the feast day at the Pilgrim Center outside the basilica, and the Masses following generally mark the end of the festivities.

== Pontifical approbations ==
The original feast date for the image was April 28, but in the 18th century, the following changes were made:

- Pope Innocent XIII moved the date to avoid its occurrence in Eastertide. In addition, he approved special liturgical texts for use during the local feast of the Santo Niño in the Philippines, set in national calendar for the third Sunday of January; this was further cemented by the founding of the Sinulog festival in 1980 over two and a half centuries later.
- Pope Paul VI issued a decree of canonical coronation for the image via the papal bull Cubanula Religionis on February 27, 1964, while the coronation was held on April 28, 1965. In less than a week on May 2, he bestowed upon the image’s shrine the status of Minor Basilica by issuing the papal bull Ut Clarificetur.
- Pope John Paul II gave papal endorsement to the image in his Mass for Families on February 19, 1981, held during his first apostolic visit to the country.
- Pope Francis called the Santo Niño de Cebú the "protector" of the Philippines in his homily at Rizal Park in Manila on January 18, 2015.

== Military honors ==
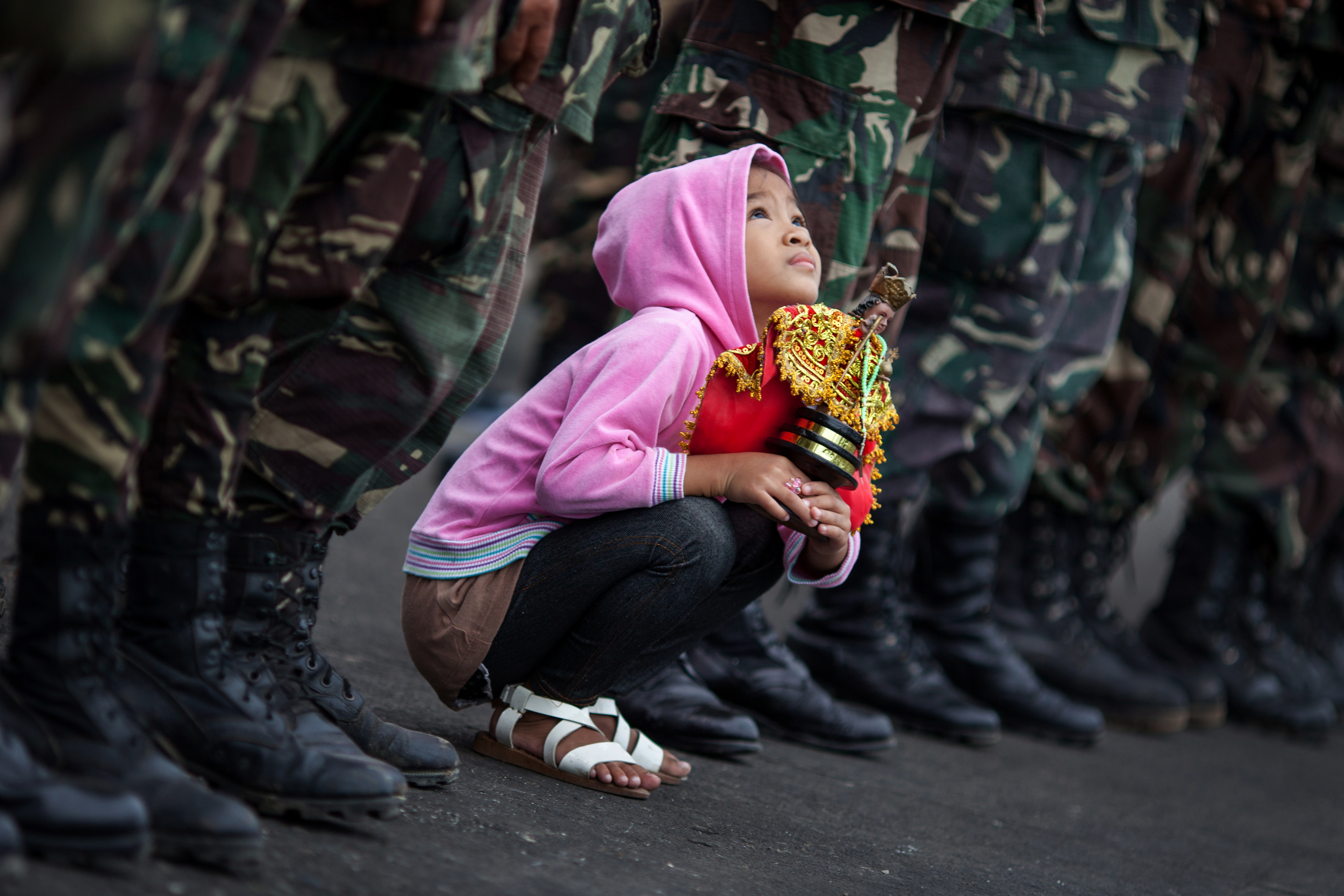
A girl holding a replica of the image at the Sinulog, 2014.

During the Spanish colonial era, the Santo Niño was given the high military rank of Captain-General, with the full title of Celentísimo Capitán General de las Esfuerzas Españolas en Filipinas ("The Most Esteemed Captain-General of the Spanish Forces in the Philippines"). For this reason, the statue is vested in a red cape and sash, symbolising the rank of a general, and military boots.

Presently, the official rank is called Celentísimo Capitán General de las Esfuerzas en Filipinas, with "Españolas" dropped, and rendered in English as "Most Esteemed Captain-General of the Forces in the Philippines". In 2011, the image was honoured by the Philippine Navy with the title “Lord Admiral of the Sea” (Spanish: Señor Almirante del Mar) to celebrate the 446th anniversary of the image's Kaplag ("finding” or “rediscovery”).

This was done in acknowledgment of Christ's “lordship over seafarers, mariners and the marine ecology.” The image was brought aboard the naval ship BRP General Emilio Aguinaldo (PG-140) for a fluvial parade, marking the first time its own naval ensign bearing its coat-of-arms was flown by a Philippine naval vessel. The ceremony was jointly held by the Naval Forces Central, Philippine Coast Guard-Cebu District, Cebu Ports Authority, and the Philippine National Police Maritime Group, among other sectors.

== Patronage ==
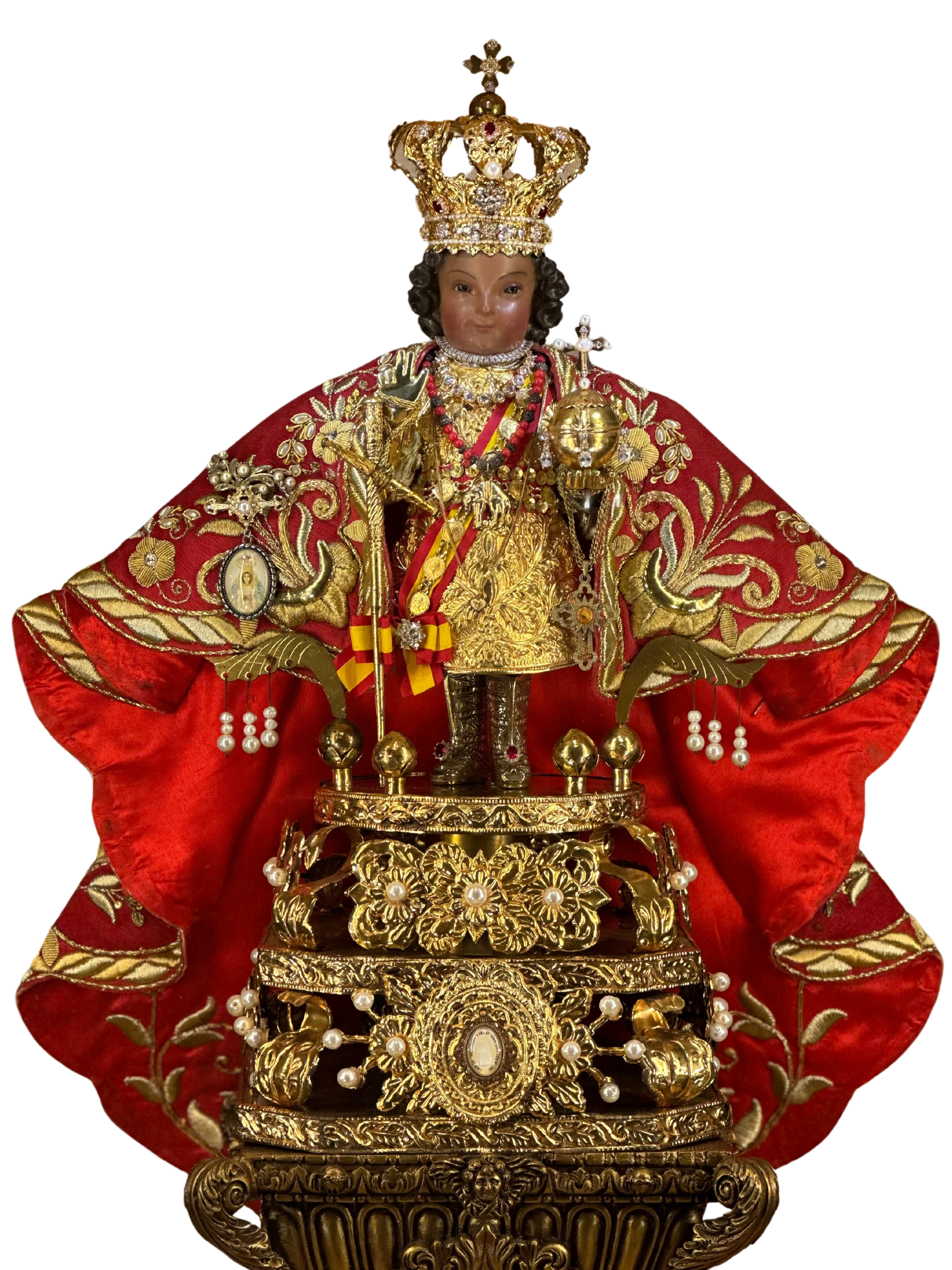
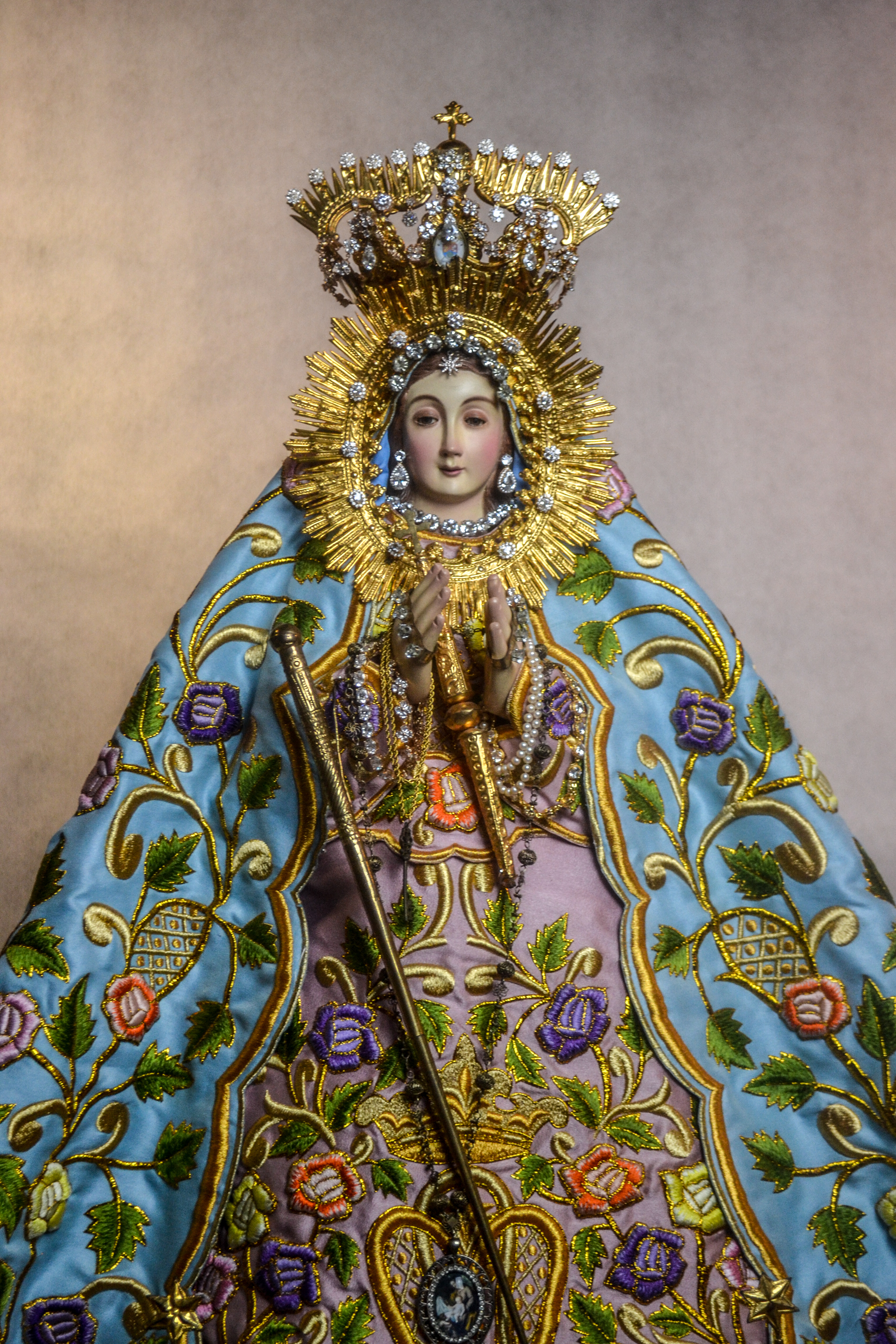
The Santo Niño (left) was considered the patron of Cebu. The Archdiocese of Cebu declared Our Lady of Guadalupe of Cebú (right) as the principal patroness of Cebu in 2002, sparking controversy among locals and officials alike.

The Santo Niño was popularly considered the official patron of Cebu, but the Church in the Philippines suppressed the notion and clarified that it is not the representation of a saint that intercedes to God but rather an image of Jesus, who is God the Son Incarnate. Instead, the Archbishop of Cebu, Cardinal Ricardo Vidal, declared Our Lady of Guadalupe of Cebú as the principal patroness of Cebu in 2002. While the declaration was initially met with negative reactions from the Cebuano people, a priest from the Colegio del Santo Niño defended the Archbishop's declaration. Eventually, the Virgin Mary under the title of “Guadalupe de Cebú” gained acceptance as the official patroness and protectress of Cebu.

Veneration of the Santo Niño is part of wider devotion to the Child Jesus as shown by other international expressions and manifestations, such as the Infant Jesus of Prague and the Holy Infant of Atocha. Variants of these images (with the latter in a standing posture unique to the Philippines) are found in many houses, establishments, and public transportation. The image is often dressed or painted in one of two colors: red is common for domestic images, while green – symbolizing luck – is for those enshrined in businesses. However, the Church has declared red as the only color for the image, and discouraged green and the image’s depiction as the so-called Santo Niño de la Suerte ("Holy Child of Luck"), with the reason being the image is not to be a superstitious attractor of material wealth. Many also often dress their images in miniature costumes which often reflect the profession or interests of a devotee, such as physicians, nurses, policemen, teachers, basketball players, and so on.

== See also ==
- Santo Niño de Tondo
- Santo Niño de Arévalo
- Black Nazarene
- Infant Jesus of Mechelen (Child Jesus of Malines)
- Infant Jesus of Prague (Child Jesus of Prague)
- Novena
