= Santo Niño Church (Tacloban) =

Roman Catholic church in Tacloban, Philippines

- The Archdiocesan Shrine of Santo Niño
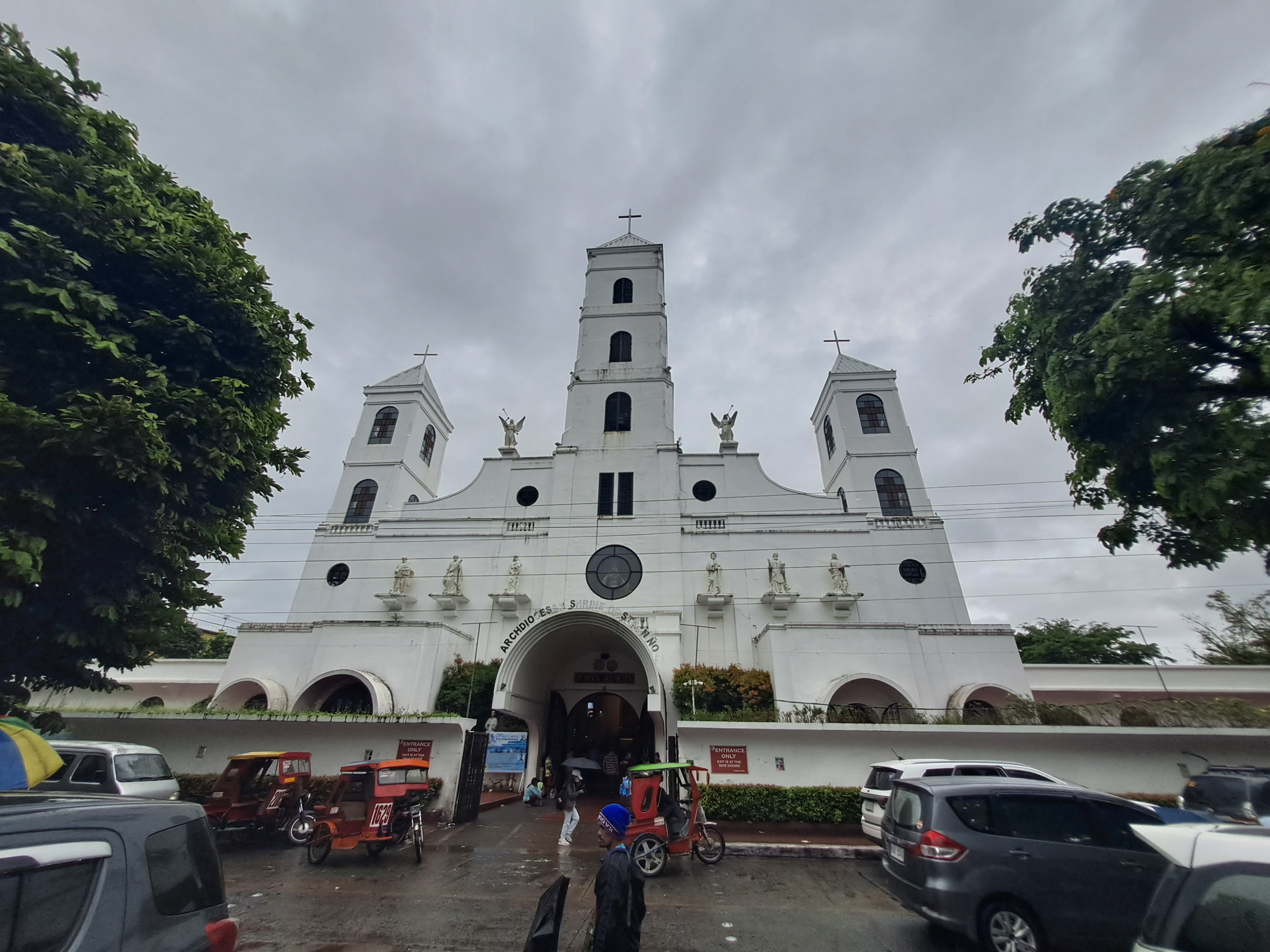
- Church facade in 2023

- Location in the Visayas Location in the Philippines
- 11°14′29″N 125°00′21″E
- Location: Tacloban
- Country: Philippines
- Denomination: Roman Catholic

History
- Former name: Santo Niño Parish Church
- Founded: 1770

Architecture
- Functional status: Active
- Architectural type: Church building

Administration
- Archdiocese: Palo

The Archdiocesan Shrine of Santo Niño, also known as Santo Niño Church, is a Roman Catholic church in Tacloban, Philippines. It is under the jurisdiction of the Archdiocese of Palo.

== History ==
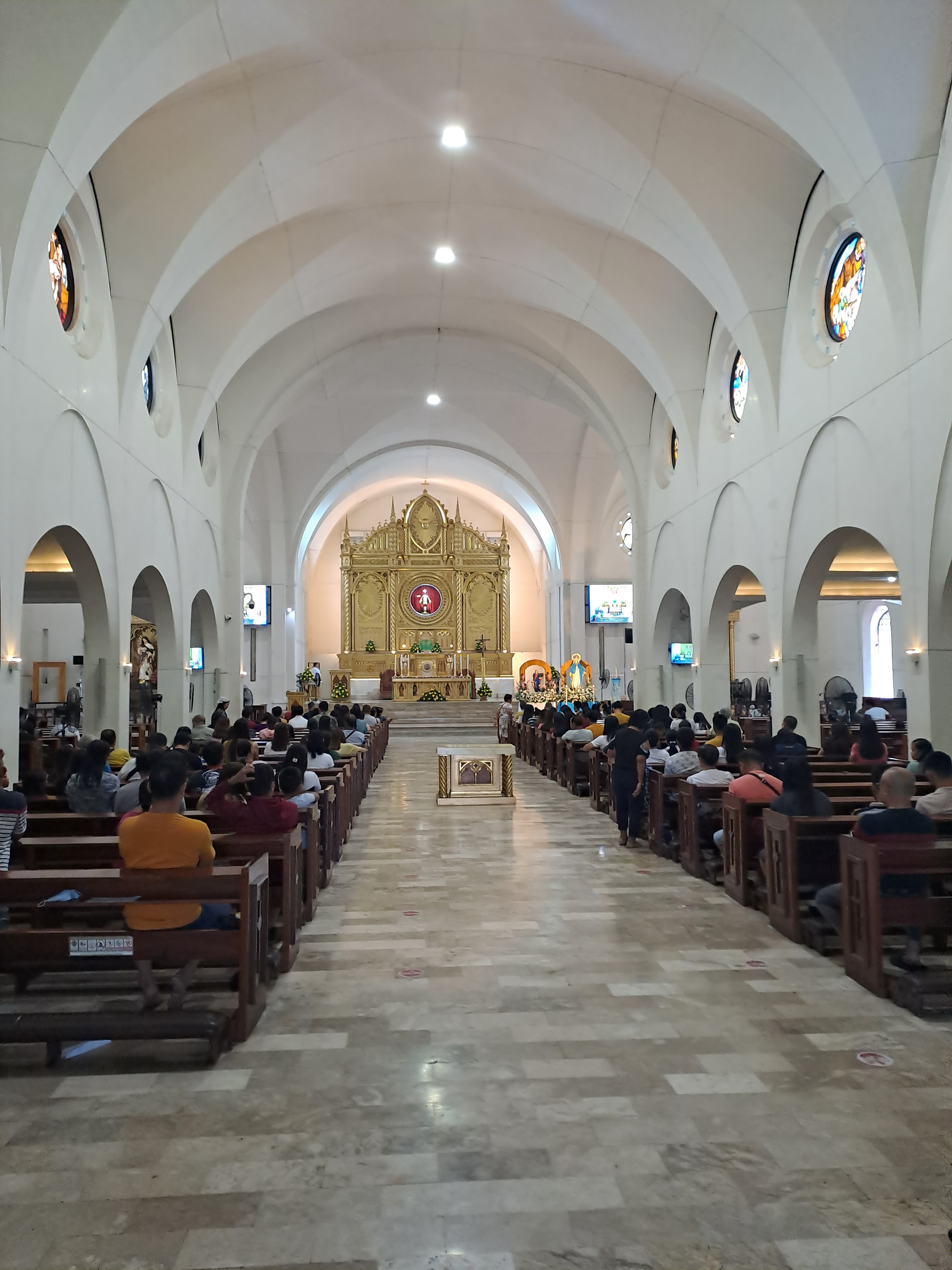
Church interior in 2023

The Santo Niño Parish Church was founded in 1770 by the Augustinian. Its namesake, the Santo Niño would be attributed to the end of a cholera epidemic in 1889. The arrival of the image of the child Jesus Christ in the Port of Tacloban, which was previously believed to be lost at sea, on June 30, 1889, was credited to have caused a miracle ending the outbreak.

The church underwent restoration in December 2014 after being severely damaged by Typhoon Haiyan (Supertyphoon Yolanda) in November 2013.

On November 1, 2021, amidst the COVID-19 pandemic, the church was elevated to an archdiocesan shrine from a parish.
