= Colegio San Agustin – Bacolod =

Roman Catholic college in Bacolod, Philippines

- Former names: Casanova School (1961–1962); Colegio de San Agustin de Bacolod (1962–1990)
- Motto: Virtus et Scientia (Latin)
- Motto in English: Virtue and Science
- Type: Private, Catholic, coeducational, basic and higher education institution
- Established: July 8, 1962; 64 years ago
- Founder: Order of Saint Augustine
- Religious affiliation: Roman Catholic (Augustinian)
- Academic affiliations: PAASCU
- President: Rev. Fr. Jose Rene C. Delariarte, O.S.A.
- Administrative staff: Approximately 350
- Undergraduates: Approximately 3,200
- Location: Bacolod, Negros Occidental, Philippines; 10°39′45″N 122°58′35″E
- Campus: Urban 1.7827 hectares (17,827 m^{2})
- Patron saint: Augustine of Hippo
- Colors: Red and gold
- Sporting affiliations: NOPSSCEA
- Mascot: Eagle
- Website: www.csab.edu.ph
- Location in the Visayas Location in the Philippines

Colegio San Agustin – Bacolod, also referred to by its acronym CSA-B, is a private, Catholic coeducational basic and higher education institution run by the Augustinian Province of Santo Niño de Cebu, Philippines of the Order of Saint Augustine in Bacolod City Negros Occidental, Philippines. It was founded by the Augustinians in 1962.

Colegio San Agustin – Bacolod is a Philippine Accrediting Association of Schools, Colleges and Universities (PAASCU)-accredited institution, bearing a Level II accredited status in the majority of its academic programs.

== History ==
The Augustinians acquired the Casanova School founded by Doña Soledad Lacson–Locsin on August 9, 1961. On July 8, 1962, the Casanova School ceased to be and officially became Colegio de San Agustin de Bacolod; the school offered kindergarten, elementary and high school education.

Construction of the first building commenced in May 1963; it was inaugurated later that same year. On July 19, 1964, the College Department opened with curricular offerings ranging from Liberal Arts, Education, Commerce and Secretarial. CSA-B is the first school in Bacolod to offer the technology courses Chemical and Mechanical Engineering, Chemistry and Medical Technology.

The school's student population doubled after the College Department opened in 1964, and the administrators had another four-storey building constructed in early 1969. Inaugurated during the Christmas season of that year, this building was then the site of the Grade School and High School Department, the Audio-Visual Center and some offices of the deans of the departments.

The school opened the College of Nursing in 1970, its most prominent alumna to date being singer Kuh Ledesma. Construction of the school gymnasium began in 1975 and was completed two years after; this edifice was destroyed by a fire in 2014. In 2023, the new gymnasium finished construction. In 1987 a building intended for the Basic Education Department was completed. In the 1990s, the school's name was simplified to Colegio San Agustin – Bacolod. The structure housing the College of Engineering was completed in 1998. In 2003, the Sto. Niño Early Childhood Learning Center campus was inaugurated. This is now called the CSA-B Villa San Agustin Campus (VSAC).

== Facilities ==
- The Sto. Niño building, constructed in 1987 to cater to an increasing number of students. It is named for the image of the Santo Niño de Cebu.
- The Engineering building, renovated in April 1992.
- The Adeodatus building, (known as the "Student Center") constructed in March 1996; named after the son of Augustine of Hippo.
- The Anselmo Polanco hall, constructed in September 1996; houses the Learning Resource Center and is named after the Blessed Anselmo Polanco, an Augustinian priest martyred during the Spanish Civil War.
- The Sta. Rita de Casia hall, constructed in April 1997. It is named after the Augustinian saint Rita of Cascia.
- The San Nicolas de Tolentino hall, in the Engineering building; constructed in August 2000 and is named after the Augustinian saint Nicholas of Tolentino.
- The Student Center was renovated into a circular five-storey building during the 2002–2003 school year; the CSA-B Park was unveiled in June 2003.
- The Early Childhood Learning Center (now the Villa San Agustin Campus or VSAC), an extension campus of the school in Brgy. Villamonte, opened in June 2003.

== Notable alumni ==
- Kuh Ledesma – pop and jazz singer
- Boyet Fernandez – coach of the Philippine Basketball Association's Sta. Lucia Realtors
- Noli Locsin – Philippine Basketball Association Mythical Team awardee
- Erik Matti – film director

=== Ten Outstanding Students of the Philippines ===
- Ma. Teresa J. Galido – National Awardee, 2001
- John Iver Solidum III – National Awardee, 2002

== See also ==
- Augustinian Province of the Most Holy Name of Jesus of the Philippines
- Augustinian Province of Sto. Niño de Cebu, Philippines
- Augustinian values
- List of tertiary schools in Bacolod City
- Santo Niño de Cebu
- La Consolacion College Bacolod
- Colegio San Agustin - Biñan
- Colegio San Agustin - Makati
- University of San Agustin — Iloilo City

== Gallery ==
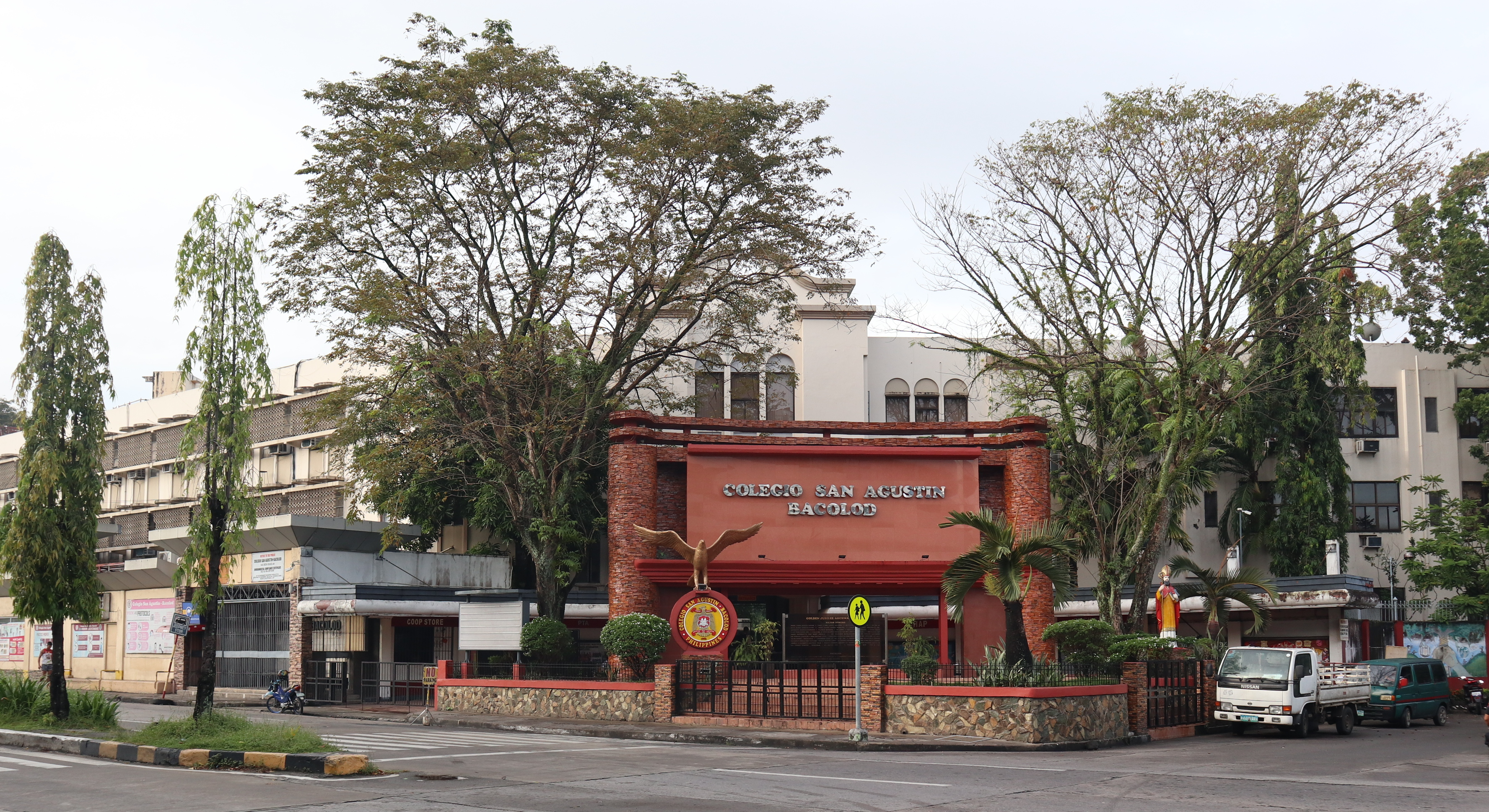
The school's entrance facade, taken in 2022

The school, with the statue of its Patron Saint, St. Augustine of Hippo

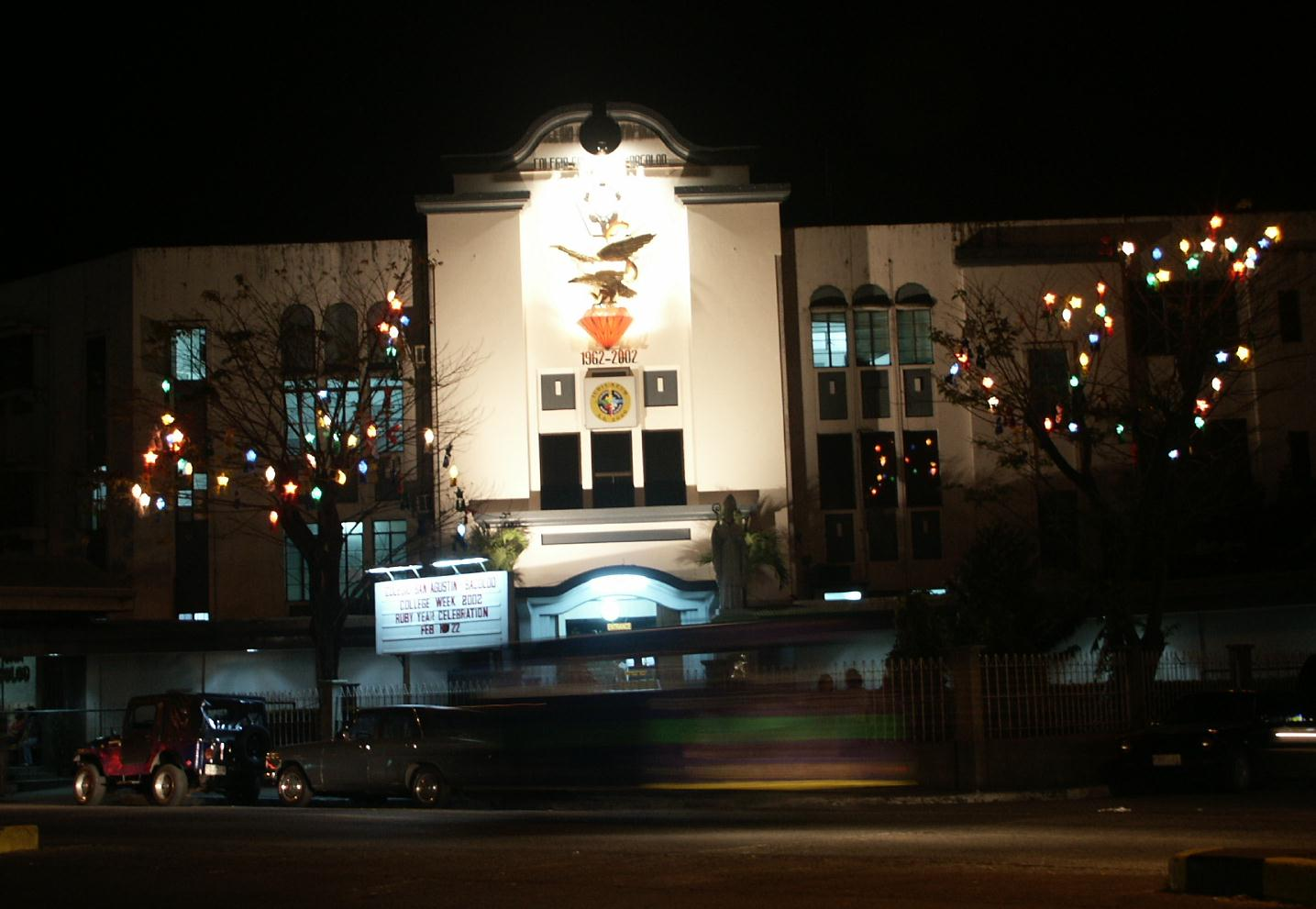
The facade of the administration building, taken in 2002 during the college's 40th anniversary

The school's Student Center
