= Colegio San Agustin – Makati =

Roman Catholic school in Makati, Philippines

Colegio San Agustín - Makati

Location
- Palm Avenue cor. Carissa Street, Dasmariñas Village, Makati, Philippines; 14°32′31″N 121°01′33″E

Information
- Type: Private, Catholic, Co-educational basic education institution
- Motto: Virtus et Scientia (Latin); Virtue and Science
- Religious affiliation: Roman Catholic (Augustinians)
- Established: July 7, 1969; 57 years ago
- Rector: Rev. Fr. Dante M. Bendoy, OSA
- Principal: Rev. Fr. Dante M. Bendoy, OSA (Grade School); Rev. Fr. Julian C. Mazana, OSA (High School)
- Grades: K to 12
- Enrollment: 5,200
- Campus: Urban (10 hectares)
- Colors: Red and Gold
Sports
Athletics Badminton Baseball Basketball Football Volleyball Softball	Swimming Taekwondo Gymnastics Lawn tennis Table tennis Gymnastics
- Mascot: Golden eagle
- Nickname: Augustinian
- Accreditation: PAASCU
- Newspaper: Kiddie Augustinian (Pre-School); Augustinian Mirror & Alab (Grade School); Insights & Salik (High School)
- Yearbook: Junior Augustinian (Grade School); Senior Augustinian (High School)
- Athletic Association: PAYA, Inter-Scholastic Sports Association, RIFA, Inter-School Tennis Association
- Website: www.csa.edu.ph

Colegio San Agustín – Makati, also referred to by its acronym CSA or CSA-Makati, is a private, Catholic, co-educational basic education institution run by the Augustinian Province of the Most Holy Name of Jesus of the Philippines of the Order of Saint Augustine in Dasmariñas Village, Makati, Metro Manila, Philippines.

The school is one of the most diverse in the Philippines in terms of nationality, with 11% of the student population coming from over 40 countries. Like its sister schools (Colegio San Agustin-Bacolod, Colegio San Agustin-Biñan and Colegio San Agustin-Bulacan), the students of CSA-Makati are called "Augustinians" (Filipino: Agustino).

In A.Y. 2025-2026, the student body is around 6,100. There are 36 students per section, and 10 sections per level, ranging from A-J, with 360 students per batch. Sections G,I, and J are mixed with Filipino students and foreigners.

== Organizational structure ==
The rector is the chief executive officer of the school, who assumes general responsibility for its management.

The director for academic affairs(Ilya Balubar) is responsible for the coordination of all academic matters in the school.

The principal (Alessandro Calbang) exercises academic and administrative leadership as the department's chief executive.

The assistant principal for academics assists the principal in the performance of the latter's duties and responsibilities, and exercises such functions as delegated to him or her by the principal or as specified in his or her appointment.

The assistant principal for administration assists the principal in the performance of the latter's duties and responsibilities pertaining to administrative matters in the department and exercises such functions as may be delegated to him/her by the principal or assistant principal for academics or as specified in his/her appointment.

The student activities coordinator plans, coordinates, and supervises co-curricular and extra-curricular activities of the students.

The institutional subject area coordinator is responsible for the development and improvement of subject curricular offerings and their implementation in institutional areas.

The departmental subject area coordinator is responsible for the development and improvement of subject curricular offerings and their implementation in the respective departments.

The head teacher is responsible for the overall discipline, activities, and management of the assigned grade level.

== History ==
In 1967, the Augustinians, with the approval of the Fr. Santos Abia y Polvorosa, the Augustinian Regional Superior, purchased from Ayala Corporation eight hectares (20 acres) of land in Dasmariñas Village, Makati, with an option to buy two hectares (4.9 acres) more within ten years. On November 24, 1976, nine years later, they received as donation from Ayala Corporation, two of the four hectares stipulated in the option agreement. In turn, they released the last two hectares of land to Ayala y Cía, for the latter to sell to other parties. By then, Colegio San Agustín already owned 10 hectares (25 acres): 8 through purchase and two through donation.

To organize a new corporation, the Augustinians used an existing organization, Colegio San Agustín (Bacolod), Inc. to acquire the land, agree to the option and make initial payments. Fr. Ambrosio Galindez of Colegio San Agustín (Bacolod), Inc. and Mr. Miguel Ortigas of Makati Development Corporation (now part of Ayala Corporation) signed the agreements in January 1967. The agreements stipulated that within six months the purchaser had to submit a development plan to the owner that would include the setting up of elementary, high school and college facilities within the area, upon which detailed plans for the buildings to be constructed would be based.

When the new corporation emerged, the president, Fr. Ambrosio Galindez, transferred the rights from Colegio San Agustín (Bacolod) to San Agustín College (Makati), Inc. on April 25, 1967.

Auxiliary Bishop Bienvenido Lopez, D.D., blessed the cornerstone of the first CSA building on September 1, 1968. Ten months later, on July 7, 1969, the school opened its doors to the first enrollees, both male and female, numbering 652.

On August 28, 1969, Cardinal Rufino Santos blessed the first buildings constructed by architect Manuel T. Mañosa Jr.: the administration building, which served as the priests' residence, and the grade school building, phase 1, which temporarily housed kindergarten, preparatory, elementary and high school levels.

At the start, only two priests, Frs. Ángel Rodríguez and Horacio Rodríguez, ran the school with the help of twenty-four lady teachers. The levels offered then were kindergarten, preparatory, grades one to six, first and second year high school. The addition of grade seven, third and fourth year high school came in subsequent years. Today, there are six Augustinian priests and nearly four hundred employees in CSA. Classes from nursery to preparatory, grades one to twelve (implementation of the K-12 program), serving a student body of more than 6,100.

School enrollment increased significantly, requiring rapid physical expansion in the early years: the bull-ring-shaped kindergarten building in 1972; the ultra-modern CSA chapel, phase 1 of the covered basketball courts, the grade school canteen and phase 2 of the grade school building in 1973, and the sports complex in 1974.

Given the need for expansion, CSA embarked on expansion projects under Architect Jose O. Dizon: the high school building in 1977, the theatre in 1980, the high school annex in 1985, and the grade school southeast wing in 1986.

In 1992 the administration pushed for the construction of the Polysport and the cafetorium. In 1995 the school equipped itself to handle computer systems.

Air-conditioning of classrooms at all levels was implemented in 2002, the year the streetlight project was completed and the vertical extension of the grade school covered walk fence added.

In 2004 architect Ireneo Jasareno conducted a major renovation of the CSA theatre, which was inaugurated on November 25, 2005, and of the Sta. Rita de Cascia Hall (grade school lecture room), which was blessed on June 30, 2006. He also was responsible for the technical supervision of the construction of La Pergola de Maria, Mary's grotto, on January 17, 2008.

As the student population continued to grow, further expansion was needed, starting with the completion of the High School Building in 1977. Other expansions and additions include those of the theatre in 1980, the High School Annex and Phase II of the covered courts in 1985, the grade school building's southeast wing in 1986, the Polysport complex, cafeteria and lounging shed (now St. Monica Hall) in 1987, the renovated administration building (since renamed Urdaneta Hall) and pre-school buildings in 1992, the renovation of the high school science laboratories in 1997, and the grade school annex in 1998. Air conditioning was introduced in the 1990s for administrative offices and function rooms and in 2003 for classrooms in all departments. The theatre was demolished and rebuilt in 2005–2006. This was followed by the renovation of the grade school chemistry laboratory in 2006 and early 2007. The gymnasium was inaugurated and blessed on July 7, 2010, and named St. Thomas of Villanova Hall.

Student possession of mobile phones and other small devices was banned since the late 1990s but was later relaxed for high school students.

On December 3, 2018, it was formally announced that Dante M. Bendoy, would be the rector from 2018 to present day.

On July 7, 2019, the school celebrated its 50th anniversary with a Eucharistic celebration conducted by Cardinal Tagle and concelebrated by invited Augustinian priests.

On December 27, 2024, the school’s rector emeritus, Fr. Horacio Rodriguez, died at the age of 93.

=== Controversies ===
In 2012, Jaime Garcia, a student at CSA Makati was being bullied by other students and fought back, stabbing one with a ball pen. Jaime then reported that the father of one of the bullies pointed a gun at home on school premises.

In 2018, Heart Evangelista recounted to Mimiyuuuh that she stopped studying at CSA-Makati because of bullying by a former classmate who lately apologized to her.

In 2022, the DepEd investigated a viral toilet “school violence” involving a ninth grade male student who used brass knuckles to pin down and repeatedly strike another causing serious physical injury.

In 2024, the alleged CSA bullying incident occurred on December 10, when Yasmien Kurdi claimed on her Instagram account that Ayesha's seven classmates ganged her up on by blocking her exit from the room. They allegedly refused her food, while other students harassed her through recording videos, thus causing her paranoia and anxiety. Kurdi also posted Ayesha's cut-up Polaroid photo on her desk. On December 17, the school management's lawyers released a statement denying Kurdi's accusations. Yasmien made the choice to homeschool Ayesha while her daughter continued therapy due to the bullying incident.

== Facilities ==
=== Athletic facilities ===
CSA has three main athletic facilities: the Cassisiacum Sports Complex, the CSA Polysport Complex and the fields.

==== St. Thomas of Villanova Hall (Sports Complex) ====
The newly inaugurated and renovated sports complex consists of state-of-the art badminton and tennis courts and multipurpose areas, a main basketball court with NBA and FIBA standards including an electronic scoreboard, hardwood flooring, retractable backboards and wall cushions for players; a second basketball court which has 6 baskets and can double as volleyball courts, a fitness room with ultra modern equipment, a running track oval which is located above the second basketball court, a cafeteria, a mini-Olympic swimming pool, a "kiddie" pool with spa, plus rooms for dance, ballet, taekwondo, flute, guitar, piano, violin, voice and other music lessons. Other areas are being eyed for rock climbing. Under the tennis courts is an underground parking lot. The inauguration took place on July 7, 2010.

==== CSA Polysport Complex ====
The CSA Polysport Complex is dominated by the six covered courts, two for each department. While they primarily serve as basketball courts, they can also be modified to become volleyball courts. Physical education classes are usually held in the covered courts, and there are stages for presentations. The offices of the Athletics Department are in the Polysport Complex.

==== Fields ====
There are two fields in CSA: one for football and one for baseball and softball. The football field is also used by the Aerospace Cadets of the Philippines. Beside the football field is a grandstand.

=== Education facilities ===
CSA has three education buildings: the Pre-School Building, the Grade School Building and the High School Building. However, there are common facilities to all the buildings: classrooms, libraries, computer laboratories, the Guidance Center and, for the Grade School and High School, the Audio-Visual Room and science laboratories

==== Classrooms ====
The typical CSA classroom is air-conditioned, each classroom has a projector and a white pull-out screen, has a blackboard/whiteboard and contains around 20-45 desks, depending on the level. In the High School, there is also a platform for teachers to stand on. There are bulletin boards in classrooms, as well as a clock, a crucifix and pictures of Saint Augustine, Our Lady of Good Counsel and St. Monica. Classrooms in the Preschool and Grade School Departments have cubbyholes for books and lunch boxes. There is also a cleaning closet that can help clean the classroom.

==== Laboratories ====
The High School has four science laboratories. There are laboratories for physical science, biology, chemistry, robotics and physics. The Chemistry Laboratory underwent renovation in 2006 and was completed in early 2007.

There are computer laboratories in each department, one in the Pre-School, four in the Grade School and four in the High School. They are used for general computer classes. In addition to the computer laboratories in the Grade School, there is a computer-aided instruction room for interactive learning.

Students and teachers can access the Internet in the classroom and faculties.

In September 13, 2024, GS school faculty along with Father Dante M. Bendoy blessed the newly renovated Grade School iMac room (previously the GS ICT Lab 1), which was used by the students later after.

==== Learning Resource Centers ====
The Learning Resource Center has three assigned department centers. The largest of these centers is the High School Library, and all are air-conditioned. All centers contain reference, Filipiniana, Augustiniana (works by St. Augustine), fiction and non-fiction sections. In the Grade School and High School, there is a "Teacher's Corner" for the exclusive use of teachers, containing textbooks and textbook manuals, as well as teacher references. There are also small "computer corners" in each library.

=== Cafeteria ===
The Cafeteria or Integrated Canteen is above the covered courts and has 23 stalls offering food and other meals in a fast-food-like fashion. There are nine entrances to the Cafeteria: two from the High School Building, two from the Grade School Building, three from the covered courts and one for each school bus terminal. It has a seating capacity of 2,186.

=== Chapel ===
San Agustin Chapel (Spanish: Capilla de San Agustin) is where all year-level, organizational and sectoral Masses are heard. It can handle around 400-500 persons, which is the size of an average year level. Due to its small size, departmental and institutional Masses are heard at the covered court, the Grade School covered court or, sometimes in the case of institutional Masses, the school gymnasium in the Sports Complex (and alternatively at the Grade School covered court).

Architectural features of the Chapel include statues of St. Augustine of Hippo and St. Monica of Hippo on both sides of the crucifix behind the altar.

San Agustin Chapel offers weekday morning Masses in English, Sunday Masses in English and Filipino, and a Spanish-language anticipated Mass.

Recently, in around 2012 renovations were made to the chapel, including added glass around the sides, installing air-conditioner units and adding glass doors as the chapel was once open and without doors.

Once in a while, classes in the grade school department sponsor mass with a class in the high school department by attending a mass before class begins. Classes in high school attend mass once a week

=== San Agustin Theatre ===
The San Agustin Theatre, also known as St. Ambrose Hall, was inaugurated in 1980 by Fr. Horacio R. Rodriguez, the former rector. The Theatre then had a seating capacity of 1,000. By the late 1990s students and staff often complained of the dilapidated interior. Therefore, the theatre was renovated between 2003 and 2005, which increased the seating capacity to 1100. The only remaining original feature of the Theatre is the mosaic in its lobby. The Theatre is used for school functions, such as academic contests, graduation, recognition ceremonies, songfests, choral recitations, and most notably the annual Lux Nova pageant. The Theatre is also rented out to private entities.

=== Urdaneta Hall ===
Urdaneta Hall, also known as the Administration Building, is the location of all CSA-wide offices. The CSA Accounting and Registrar's Offices are on the ground floor. There are bathrooms in the Accounting and Registrar's Offices for parents. Other than those offices, Urdaneta Hall is off-limits to students. Beside the Accounting and Registrar's Offices is the Technology Services office.

== Student activities ==
The school has co-curricular clubs for student participation. The school fields varsity teams and official school delegations participate in competitive leagues and contests on the local, national, and international levels.

These clubs organize competitions between individuals, classes, and batches in the High School; teachers assume this responsibility in the Grade School.

=== Student government ===
The Unit 2 (Grade School) and Unit 3 (High School) each have student governments: Grade School Student Government (GSSG) and the Supreme Student Council (SSC). These are elected by popular vote through secret balloting by students from Fourth to Sixth Grade for GSSG, and by students from Grade 7 to Grade 12 for the SSC. For the elections, students vote for their officers the year before the elected officers will begin serving. In 2010, the GSSC held its first automated elections with the use of a computer website (Phoenix Aralinks (CSA GS modified)) instead of a ballot.

The SSC serves as an umbrella organization for the smaller year level councils (the Grade 7,8, 9, 10, 11, and 12 councils). These are elected the same way as the SSC and GSSG, although with voting restricted to the members of their respective year levels, making these "batch" presidents the Filipino equivalents of American class presidents.

=== Year-round Activities ===
In each academic year, each month has a subject and a value, lining up at times with the DepEd calendar. For grade school, they have two plays each year, one in English and another in Filipino. They also have intramurals (shortened to intrams), which is a competition where classes in a batch compete in basketball, soccer, and volleyball.

High school also has similar activities, although they are slightly changed. In high school, there are two plays in Filipino. There is also a contest during nutrition month where students create a short presentation and song to support nutrition and a healthy diet. High school also has intrams, but the final level is when the top teams of two batches comepete against each other. Another highly anticipated event is the cheering competition, which occurs every other year. In this competition, batches compete in their level grouping (ex. Grade 4, Grade 5, Grade 6) with a long, often 5 minute cheer. These can be found online on sites like Youtube.

Graduating classes from elementary and high school also have to perform their Graduation rites and celebrations. These are baccalaureate mass and the graduation ceremony.

== Notable people ==
Numerous alumni of Colegio San Agustin-Makati have become celebrities.

TV Personalities: Actress and Television personality Annette Gozon-Valdes, Kris Aquino; Myx VJs Iya Villania and Luis Manzano, taekwondo champion, actor and public servant Monsour del Rosario, Cristina Gonzales-Romualdez, Pia Guanio, Karen Kunawicz, Ysabel Ortega, news anchors Vicky Morales, Karen Davila, and Pinky Webb.

Music: Concert King Martin Nievera; Velcro lead singer and The Voice of the Philippines season 1 finalist, Junji Arias; Roselle Nava, Pilipinas Got Talent Season 3 runner-up Khalil Ramos; FlipTop Battle emcee and rapper Abra; and internationally-known band Prettier Than Pink.

Film: Heart Evangelista, Lovi Poe, Ruffa Gutierrez, Gretchen Barretto, Dominic Ochoa, Andrea Torres, TJ Trinidad, Desiree del Valle, Maui Taylor, JC de Vera, Valeen Montenegro, Bela Padilla, Lovi Poe, and Nikki Valdez;

Models: Julie Lee, Kelly Misa; Miss Universe Philippines 2017, Rachel Peters.

Sports: Olympians-TV hosts Christine Jacob and Dyan Castillejo; Olympians Felix Barrientos, Eric Buhain, and Akiko Thomson; former PBA player Robert "Dodot" Jaworski Jr.; equestrian Mikee Cojuangco-Jaworski; and former Ateneo Blue Eagles women's volleyball players Julia Melissa "Jia" Morado and Dennise Michelle "Denden" Lazaro also graduated high-school from CSA. Tennis player Alexandra Eala also studied at CSA for a while.

Politics: Senator Juan Miguel Zubiri, Mans Carpio.

== See also ==
- Augustinian Province of the Most Holy Name of Jesus of the Philippines
- Colegio San Agustin - Biñan
- Colegio San Agustin - Bacolod
- University of San Agustin
- Santo Niño de Cebu
