= Colegio San Agustin – Biñan =

Private college in Laguna, Philippines

- Logo of Colegio San Agustin – Biñan
- Motto: Virtus et Scientia (Latin)
- Motto in English: Virtue and Science
- Type: Private, Roman Catholic, Non-profit coeducational, basic and higher education institution
- Established: 1985; 41 years ago
- Founder: Order of Saint Augustine
- Religious affiliation: Roman Catholic (Augustinian)
- Academic affiliations: PAASCU
- President: Rev. Fr. Dante O. Juloc, O.S.A.
- Administrative staff: Approximately 228
- Students: Approximately 3,282
- Location: Southwoods Interchange, Biñan, Laguna, Philippines; 14°19′49″N 121°03′11″E
- Campus: Urban, 5 hectares (50,000 m^{2})
- Patron saint: St. Augustine of Hippo
- Colors: Red & gold
- Sporting affiliations: ASAM
- Mascot: Golden eagle
- Website: csabin.edu-ph.net
- Location within Laguna Location within Luzon Location within Philippines

Colegio San Agustin – Biñan (also referred to as CSA–Biñan), is a private, Catholic coeducational basic and higher education institution run by the Augustinian Province of Santo Niño de Cebu, Philippines of the Order of Saint Augustine in Biñan, Laguna, Philippines. It was founded by the Augustinians 1985.

Its primary and secondary education programs are accredited Level III by the Philippine Accrediting Association of Schools, Colleges and Universities (PAASCU).

== History ==
Colegio San Agustin – Biñan began as a school for boys and girls attending preschool through third grade. Incorporated on November 16, 1984, it is located on a five-hectare site donated by a private land developer to the Augustinian Province of Santo Niño de Cebu, Philippines. The first faculty and staff consisted of twenty lay personnel and three priest-administrators catering to the needs of 646 students. The founding administrators included Rev. Rodolfo P. Sicio, OSA as Rector and Principal, Rev. Alfredo Jubac, OSA as treasurer, and Rev. Marcelino Malana, OSA as a guidance counselor and sports coordinator. Miss Doris S. Calog serves as the school Registrar, Assistant Principal, and Academic Coordinator of all departments.

The Preschool Department was part of the Colegio San Agustin since it started the operation in June 1985. There were 290 pupils in its first year of operation. The department continued to expand its structure as more pupils were added each year. Improving the curriculum was done in response to the needs of the pupils. Total enrollment peaked at 790 in the academic year 1992–1993. Appropriate measures were introduced to effectively manage the growing pupils' populace and sustain the upgraded standard of instruction. Strict screening procedures were also implemented both for the admission of pupils and for the hiring of faculty.

== Patron saint ==
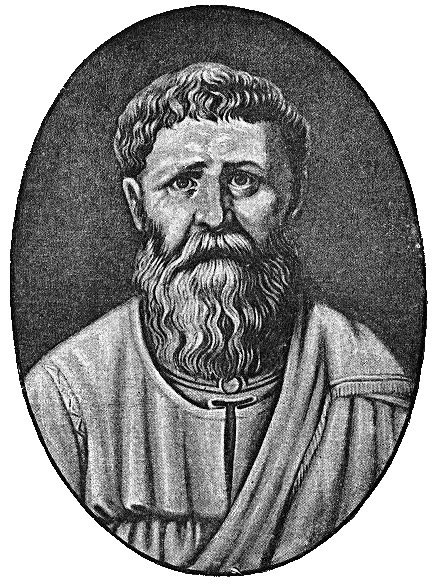
St. Augustine of Hippo as pictured during the Renaissance

The school is named in honor of St. Augustine of Hippo, a key figure in the doctrinal development of Western Christianity and a "Doctor of the Church" Two of his surviving works, namely, The Confessions (his autobiography) and The City of God, are regarded as Western classics. Augustine is often considered to be one of the theological fountainheads of the Reformation because of his teaching on salvation and grace. Martin Luther, perhaps the greatest figure of the Reformation, was himself an Augustinian friar.

Other English speaking Augustinian Schools with the same patron include Colegio San Agustin – Makati, Colegio del Santo Niño in Cebu, Colegio San Agustin – Bacolod, St. Augustine's College, Sydney in Australia, St. Augustine Preparatory School, Richland, New Jersey; St. Augustine High School, San Diego, California; and Austin Preparatory School in Reading, Massachusetts - all three in the United States; and St. Augustine College in Malta.

== School seal ==
=== Symbols and meanings ===
- Golden Eagle – represents the lofty intellect of St. Augustine as a soaring eagle of Hippo, Africa.
- Heart – symbolizes love and charity, the first rule of St. Augustine.
- Crosier and mitre – represent the bishopric of St. Augustine.
- Book – symbolizes the writings of St. Augustine and his intellectual depth as a writer, making him the greatest Doctor of the Church.
- Tolle Lege, Tolle Lege – (Latin, "Take up and read"), the words spoken by a voice heard by St. Augustine which led to his conversion to Catholicism in the year 386.
- Colors – Red stands for courage, and gold for victory over evil.
- Virtus et Scientia – (Latin, "Virtue and Science"), the traditional motto of the Augustinians, representing the two pillars of the Augustinian way of education.

== Instructional programs ==
The instructional program in the Grade School (GS), Junior High School (JHS), and Senior High School (SHS) Department highlights the formation of mind and character of the students and has all been aligned to the School's Vision-Mission.

The three departments follows the K to 12 Basic Education Curriculum (BEC) effective academic year 2012–2013. This shall be implemented starting with the roll-out of Grades 1 and 7 in pursuance to Department of Education Order No. 31, series of 2012. The subjects and course programs of each grade level have been articulated in all departments to make certain that there is no overlapping in content areas and to monitor the continuity of learning.

=== Grade School Department (Grades 1 to 6) ===
The curricular offerings are modified with the Computer and Christian Living.

=== Junior High School Department (Grades 7 to 10) ===
The curriculum is modified with Christian Values Education, Statistics, Geometry Advanced Algebra with Trigonometry, Research, and Information and Communications Technology (ICT) subjects. Robotics is included in the curriculum wherein it enhances the ICT, Mathematics and Science subjects. Yet for the seventh grade in A. Y. 2024–2025 they are implementing the new Matatag Curriculum which focuses on three major subjects: English, Math, and Science.

=== Senior High School (Grades 11 to 12) ===
==== Academic track ====
- Science, Technology, Engineering and Mathematics (STEM)
- Accountancy and Business Management (ABM)
- Humanities and Social Sciences (HUMSS)

==== Tech-Voc-Liv track ====
- Information and Communications Technology (ICT)
- Home Economics (HE)

== International Students Center ==
The increasing number of international students and their schedule of irregular enrolment prompted the former school president, Rev. Fr. Richard L. Pido, OSA to creare the International Students Office (ISO) which is now known as the International Students Center (ISC). The Bureau of Immigration granted its license last April 28, 2005, with License No. AFF-05-054. Its operation formally started last June 2008.

The center caters students from different countries like Canada, China, Finland, Germany, India, Italy, Japan, Papua New Guinea, Singapore, South Korea, Taiwan, Thailand, United Kingdom, United States, and United Arab Emirates.

=== Program offerings ===
1. Regular Class Program
2. Intervention Program
3. English Language Program
4. Special Communication Arts Program I, II, III
5. Special Filipino Language Program
6. Social Studies for the International Students
7. Sit-in Program for the International Students

== College Department ==
The College Department opened in the Academic Year 1998-1999 and offered 12 courses in its initial year of operation, ten were baccalaureate programs and two were associate courses. However, in AY 2001–2002, the college streamlined and focused in offering six major courses. The first set that were granted government recognition by the Commission on Higher Education (CHED) on October 19, 2001, were Bachelor of Science in Foreign Service, Bachelor of Science in Computer Science, Bachelor of Science in Psychology, Bachelor of Science in Tourism, and Bachelor of Science in Hotel and Restaurant Management. On June 26, 2001, Bachelor of Arts in Communication was offered. Bachelor of Science in Information Technology and Bachelor of Science in Business Administration followed in the AY 2003–2004.

=== College course offerings ===
- Bachelor of Arts in Communication
- Bachelor of Science in Business Administration
  - Major in Marketing Management
- Bachelor of Science in Computer Science
- Bachelor of Science in Foreign Service
- Bachelor of Science in Hotel and Restaurant Management
- Bachelor of Science in Information Technology
- Bachelor of Science in Psychology
- Bachelor of Science in Tourism

== Gallery ==
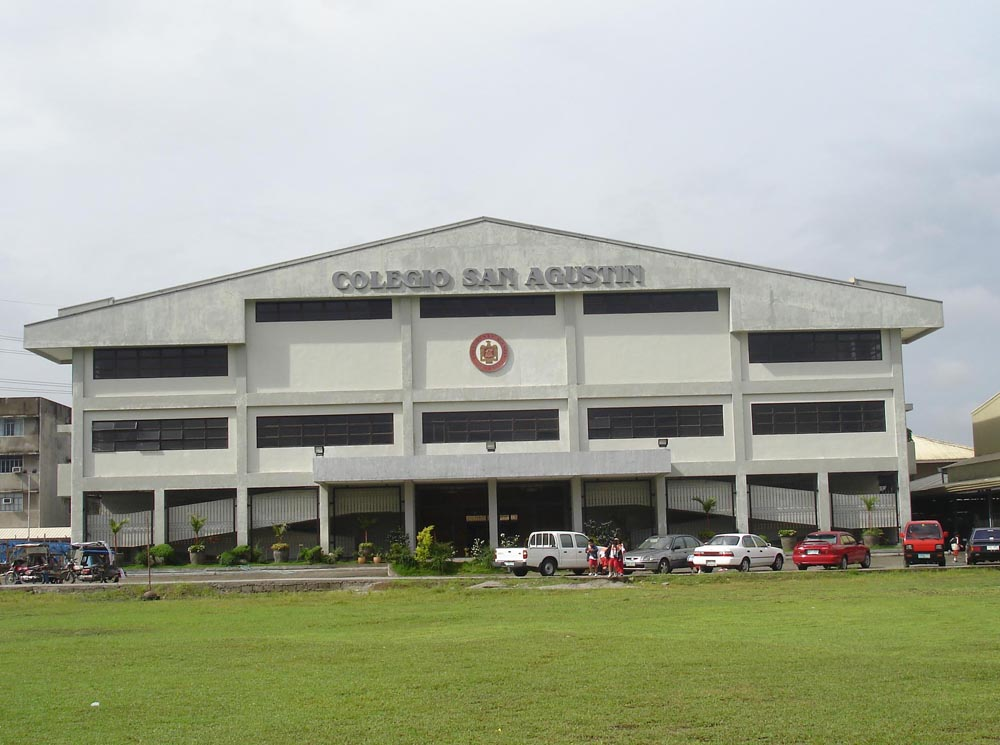
The school gymnasium

St. Augustine's statue

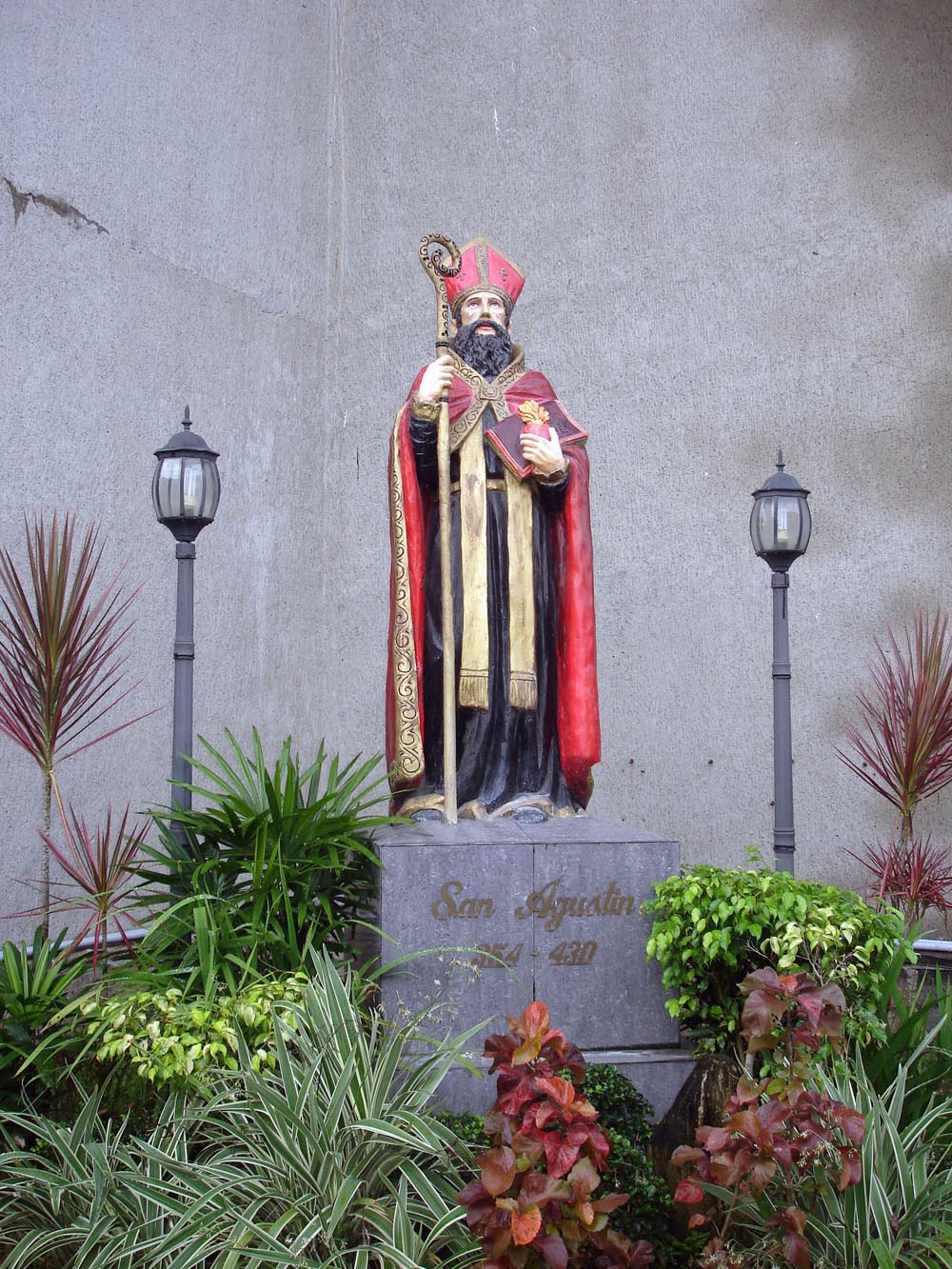
Statue of St. Augustine in the school garden

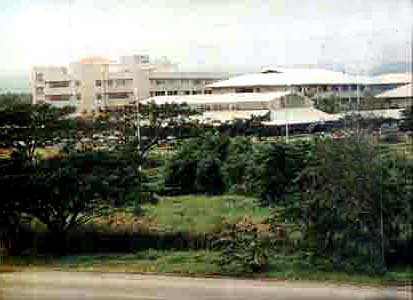
View of the school from the South Super Highway

== Notable alumni ==
- Angeli Gonzales
- Ken Chan
- Nikki Valdez
- Taki Saito

== See also ==
- Augustinian Province of the Most Holy Name of Jesus of the Philippines
- Colegio San Agustin – Makati
- Colegio San Agustin – Bacolod
- University of San Agustin
- Santo Niño de Cebú
