= Augustinian Province of Santo Niño de Cebu =

Augustinian logo

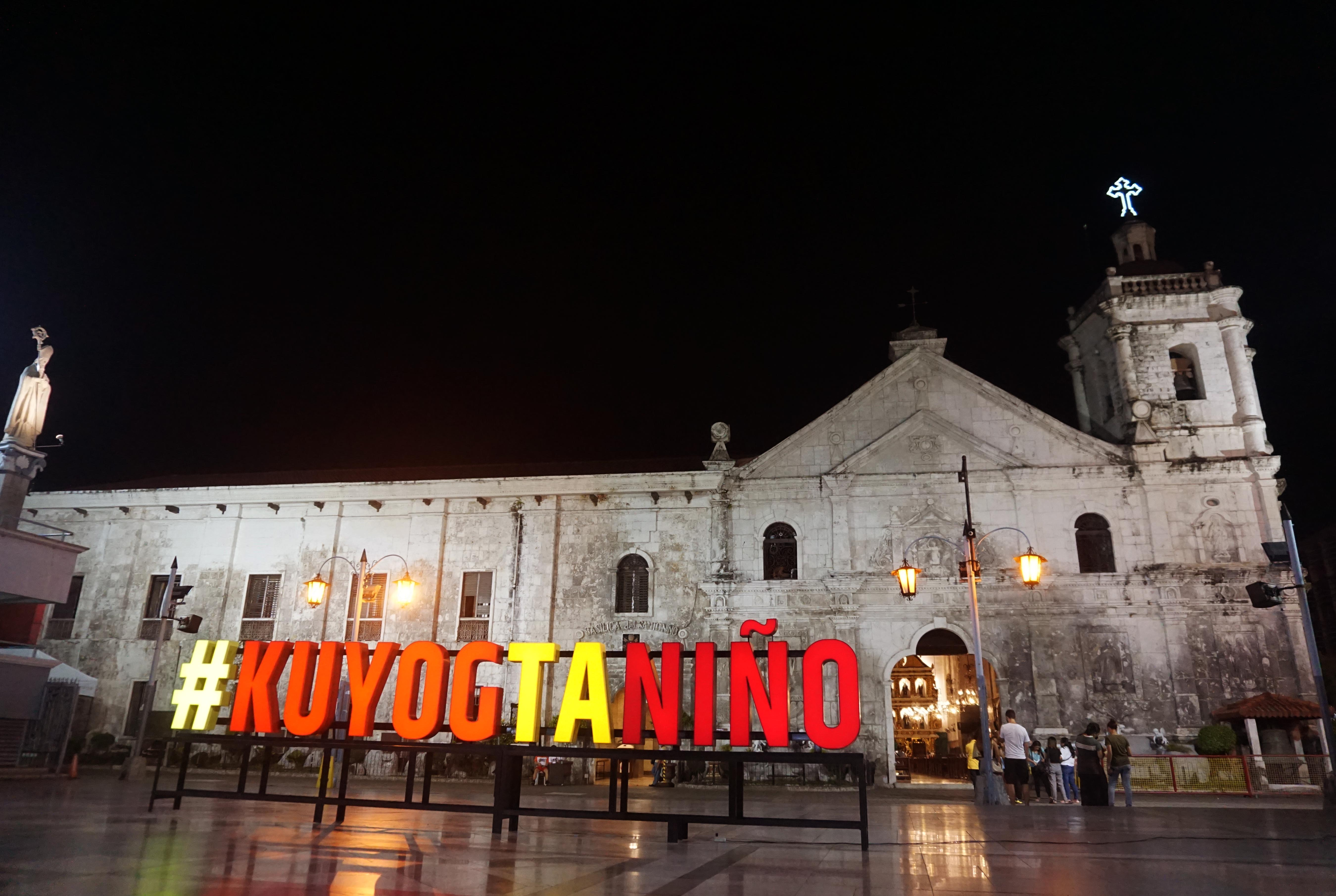
Basilica del Santo Niño, Cebu City, Philippines

The Augustinian Province of Sto. Niño de Cebu, based in Cebu City, Philippines, is a geographical and administrative subdivision of the religious Order of St. Augustine. The Province is actively involved in education, parish administration, mission work and formation of candidates for religious life. It has worked on joint missions with other Augustinian provinces, namely, the Australian Province in South Korea, the Dutch Province in Indonesia, and the Provinces of Villanova (United States), Ireland and England-Scotland in South Africa. In keeping with its goal to become a missionary Province, it has begun sending friars overseas to help in apostolic and pastoral ministries.

== History ==
Logo of the Province of Sto. Niño de Cebu, Philippines ca. 1983

The first group of Augustinians, under the leadership of the Venerable Andres Urdaneta, came to the Philippines in 1565 from Spain through Mexico as the pioneers in the Catholic Church's task of evangelization in that part of the globe. Originally establishing themselves in Cebu, these missionaries soon expanded their apostolic activities to the neighboring towns and islands and later to almost all the other principal regions of the archipelago.

On March 7, 1575, the then Prior General of the Order, Fr. Tadeo de Perusa, decreed the creation of a new Augustinian Province in the Philippines under the title Santisimo Nombre de Jesus de Filipinas – Most Holy Name of Jesus of the Philippines. During the Spanish colonial times in the Philippines, they founded almost three hundred towns and churches from 1565 to 1898.

At the turn of the twentieth century, the Province of the Most Holy Name of Jesus of the Philippines decided to shift its missionary activities to newer territories, such as Peru, Colombia, and Venezuela. As a logical consequence of this move, the seat of the Province was transferred from Manila to Madrid. The Augustinian presence in the country was then reduced to a minimum.

To compensate for this loss of manpower, the remaining Augustinians intensified the recruitment and formation of Filipino candidates. And as the number of the latter increased and their preparedness adequately established, the idea of creating a new Province came to be seriously considered.

Plans for the organization of such a Province began in 1974 when the Regional Assembly of the Philippine Augustinian Vicariate asked for the creation of a Vice-Province in the islands. Though the plan was not realized, it was again revived by a group of Filipino Augustinians at a meeting in the Basilica Minore del Santo Niño in Cebu on April 29, 1981. The plan this time was for the creation of a new Province. The move to create a new Province, which would be called the Province of Sto. Niño de Cebu-Philippines, was officially endorsed by the Regional Assembly of the Augustinian Vicariate of the Philippines at the closing of its sessions on August 19, 1981, in the Monastery of San Agustin, Intramuros, Manila, and by the Provincial Chapter of the Province of the Most Holy Name of Jesus of the Philippines, held in Valladolid, Spain on July 17, 1982. The proposal was overwhelmingly approved by the members of the 174th General Chapter held in Rome on September 15, 1983, and the new province was canonically established on December 25, 1983.

== Formation of the province ==
The province was officially formed on September 13, 1983, inside the Istituto Patristico Augustinianum in Rome during the 174th General Chapter of the Augustinian Order, where ninety-three delegates approved the creation of the first indigenous Augustinian province in Asia after over 400 years of control by Spanish religious leaders. The Province of Sto. Niño de Cebu gained autonomy from the mother province, the Province of the Most Holy Name of Jesus of the Philippines, which is based in Spain.

The first Prior Provincial was Rev. Fr. Eusebio B. Berdon, OSA, who later became an assistant Prior General of the Order in Rome. Initially, the Province had thirty-six friars and religious brothers and sixty-one aspirants, novices, postulants and theology students.

== Houses ==
Institutions, or houses, owned by the Province, include the following:

- Basilica Minore del Santo Niño, also called the Basilica of Sto. Niño de Cebú, where the image of the Santo Niño de Cebú is kept.
- University of San Agustin in Iloilo City.
- University of San Agustin Extension Campus at Sambag, Jaro, Iloilo City.
- Colegio San Agustin-Bacolod in Bacolod.
- San Jose Parochial School and Parish in Plaza Libertad, Iloilo City.
- Colegio San Agustin-Biñan in Biñan, Laguna.
- Colegio San Agustin - Mati in Davao Oriental
- San Agustin Seminary - Monasterio de Guadalupe or Guadalupe Monastery in Makati.
- San Agustin Center of Studies in Quezon City.
- Augustinian Novitiate and Prayer House in Talisay City, Cebu.
- Sto. Niño de Cebu Parish, Lower Mohon, Talisay City, Cebu
- Our Mother of Pepetual Help Parish, Socorro, Surigao del Norte
- St. Lawrence the Deacon Parish, Bagacay, Sorsogon
- Sto. Niño Spirituality Center, Consolacion, Cebu
- Sto. Niño Pilgrim Center, Cebu City (Provincialate Community)
- Sta. Ana Sub-Parish, Burgos, Siargao Island, Surigao del Norte
- St. Augustine of Hippo Quasi-parish, Saguday, Quirino

== See also ==
- Augustinian Province of the Most Holy Name of Jesus of the Philippines
