= University of San Agustin =

Roman Catholic university in Iloilo City, Philippines

- Pamantasang San Agustin (Filipino)
- Coat of arms
- Former name: Colegio de San Agustin (1904–1953)
- Motto: Virtus et Scientia (Latin)
- Motto in English: Virtue and Knowledge
- Type: Private, Research, Non-profit, Basic and Higher education institution
- Established: July 15, 1904
- Founder: Order of Saint Augustine
- Religious affiliation: Roman Catholic (Augustinian)
- President: Rev. Fr. Arnel S. Dizon, O.S.A. Ph.D.
- Administrative staff: ~1,000
- Undergraduates: ~14,000+
- Postgraduates: ~200+
- Location: Gen. Luna St., Iloilo City, Iloilo, Philippines; 10°41′58″N 122°33′47″E
- Campus: Urban Main Campus General Luna St., Iloilo City (Senior High School & Colleges) 8.9 hectares (89,000 m^{2}) Satellite Campus Barangay Sambag, Jaro, Iloilo City (Basic Education - Junior High School and Grade School) 2.86 hectares (28,600 m^{2})
- Patron saint: St. Augustine of Hippo
- Colors: Red for courage Gold for victory over evil
- Nickname: Golden Eagles
- Sporting affiliations: UNIGAMES, PRISAA ASAM
- Mascot: Eagle
- Website: www.usa.edu.ph

- Location in the Visayas Location in the Philippines

The University of San Agustin, also known as San Agustin or San Ag, is a private Roman Catholic institution in Iloilo City, Philippines. It is operated by the Augustinian Province of Santo Niño de Cebu, Philippines, belonging to the Order of Saint Augustine. Founded in July 1904, it started as a school for boys with 40 students. In 1917, it became Colegio de San Agustin and later achieved university status in March 1953, becoming the first university in Western Visayas and the first Augustinian university in the Asia-Pacific region.

The University of San Agustin offers a wide range of academic programs, starting from Basic Education up to post-graduate studies. These programs cover various fields such as Law, Business, Education, Computer Studies, Arts and Sciences, Performing Arts, Music, Engineering, Medical Technology, Nursing, and Pharmacy. In 2013, the university celebrated its 60th year as an institution of higher learning. It is recognized as a Center of Development in Teacher Education by the Commission on Higher Education (CHED).

== History ==
=== Founding ===
The old administration building of Colegio de San Agustin, circa 1910s; completely destroyed during World War II

The Spanish Augustinians were the first Christian missionaries of any religious order to enter the Philippines and begin its conversion to Catholicism. Later after the revolution, Spanish Augustinian friars were removed from 194 parishes and left the Philippines in 1899, eventually turning over their churches and mission stations to secular clergy. The Order retained only a few parishes, including their main foundations in Cebu, Manila, and Iloilo, with American friars taking over them.

On 15 July 1904, American members of the order along with Filipino friars belonging to the Province of the Most Holy Name of Jesus of the Philippines, founded the university and established it with assistance from their confreres from the Augustinian U.S. Province of St. Thomas of Villanova. It began as a preparatory school for boys during the American colonial period. On 12 December 1912, it was granted government recognition for its various course offerings. Later on 5 February 1917, it was formally incorporated under the name Colegio de San Agustín de Iloilo. In 1928, one of the country's oldest campus publications, The Augustinian Mirror, was established, producing some of the country's well-known writers. The 1930s saw rapid growth with the opening of three colleges in quick succession: College of Liberal Arts in 1935, College of Commerce in 1936 and College of Law in 1937. In 1940, the college began admitting female students.

During the Second World War (1941–45), the college was temporarily closed as the Philippines fought a guerrilla war against the Japanese. The war led to the destruction of all the buildings, except for Urdaneta Hall, which at present houses the university theatre and the College of Pharmacy and Medical Technology. With almost the entire college in ruins, some friars advocated closing the school altogether while others pushed for its immediate rehabilitation. American Augustinians came on loan after the War to help the Order run the University of San Agustin for a couple of years while young friars from Spain of the Philippine Province were studying their master's degrees and learning English in the United States or Australia.

It was eventually reopened in 1945, followed by a decade of expansion that ushered in both the College of Pharmacy and the College of Technology (1945), the Normal (Teacher's) College (1947), the Graduate School (1950), and the College of Dentistry (1953). The school was granted university status on 1 March 1953, a year before its 50th anniversary, making it the first university in Western Visayas.

The following year, the Rev. Angel Dulanto, OSA arrived from Spain after completing his studies at Villanova University, an American sister school of San Agustin. As an impresario, he introduced the yearly velada, characterized by a weeklong festivity of artistic, religious, and cultural events. A zarzuela, staged by both professors and students, is the centerpiece of University Week from 14 to 20 February.

In 1965, the Rev. Nicanor Lana, OSA became rector of the university. His term was marked by vast improvements in the school's infrastructure. The same year he started his term as rector, he inaugurated DySA, the official radio station of the university, to help expand the reach of the university through mass media. The University of San Agustín Press, known today as Libro Agustino, came a year later. In the months leading to the centenary of San Agustín in 2004, it began publishing book titles by Augustinian authors, with an eye at producing a total of 100 different volumes over several years.

Poor enrollment forced the administrators to phase out the College of Dentistry in 1967. But a flowering of cultural and artistic activities on campus led to the founding of the famous Kawilihan-USA Dance Troupe, the USA Troubadours, and the Conservatory of Music. The Rev. Santiago Ezcurra, OSA, a Spanish musician who studied music in Rome, was formally installed as its first dean. In 1969 the USA Clinical Laboratory was opened, followed a few years later by the introduction of the College of Nursing in 1974. In 2010, the university announced the establishment of a new extension campus in Mati, Davao Oriental, Philippines.

=== 1984 to present ===
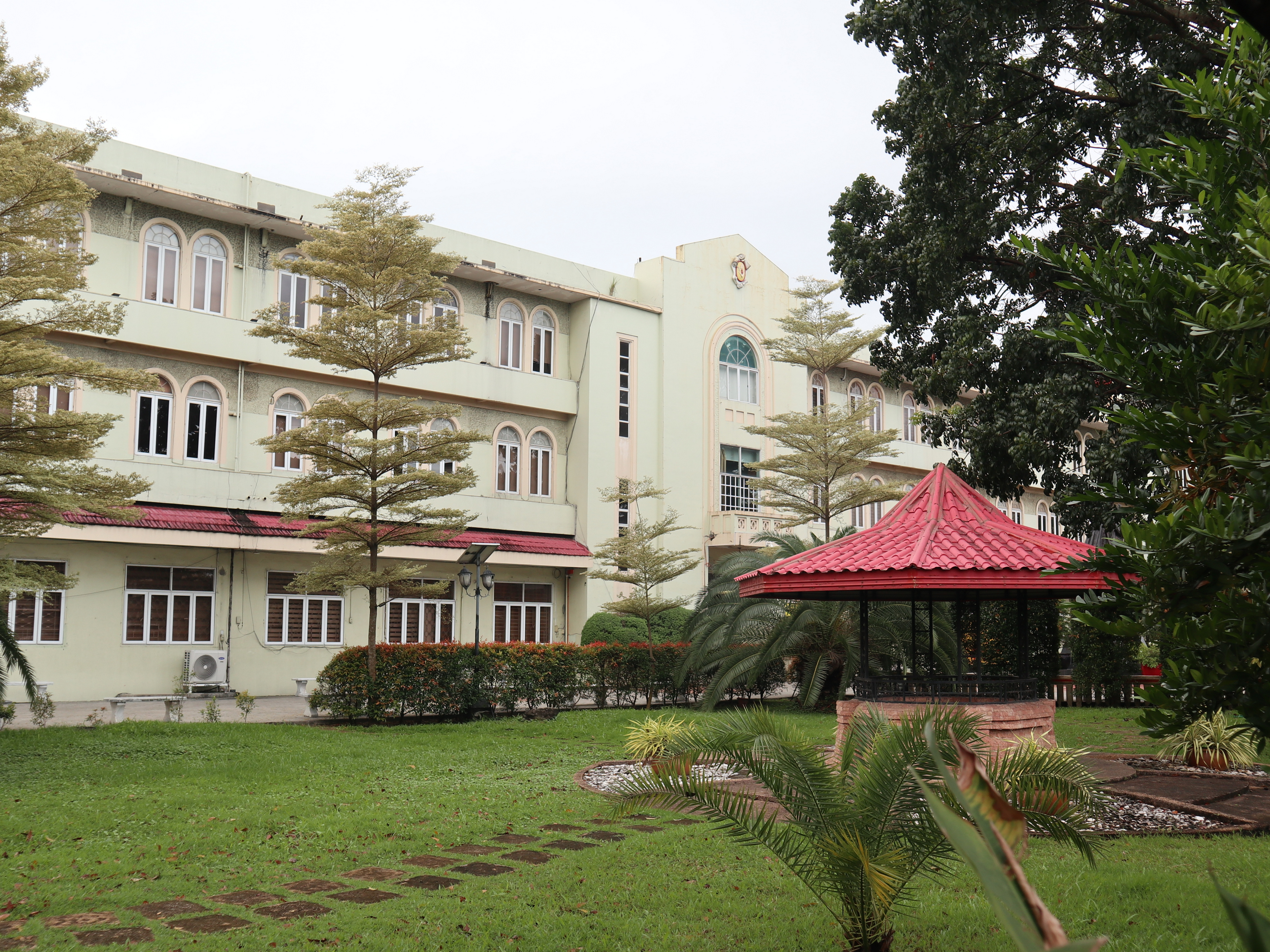
Herrera Hall, the new administration building of the university

The university maintains a Level III accreditation status granted by the PAASCU and is one of the two schools in the region having an autonomous status granted by CHED in early 2000. The university's campus, situated in the very heart of the city on General Luna Street, has a modern gymnasium, an auditorium, various conferences and seminar rooms, science, computer and speech laboratories, a museum, a bookstore, a library, an instructional media center, an Olympic size swimming pool and tennis and badminton courts.

In 1984 the all-Filipino Augustinian Province of Santo Niño of Cebu was formed, separating from the mother Province of the Most Holy Name of Jesus of the Philippines based in Madrid, and ownership of the university was handed over to the latest circumscription of the Augustinian Order. A succession of rectors were appointed, including Bernardino Ricafrente, Eusebio Berdon, Mamerto Alfeche, and Rodolfo Arreza. During Arreza's term, he pursued linkages with various universities abroad and focused on research development.

San Agustín promotes literature in the region through the Fray Luis de Léon Creative Writing Institute, sponsor of the annual national writers workshop of the same name. The workshop awards a number of writing fellowships to writers in English, Hiligaynon, and other Philippine languages. Its official student publication, The Augustinian Mirror, has won various journalism awards and has produced some of the Philippines' highly respected literary minds, notably Augustinian poet Gilbert Luis R. Centina III, OSA.

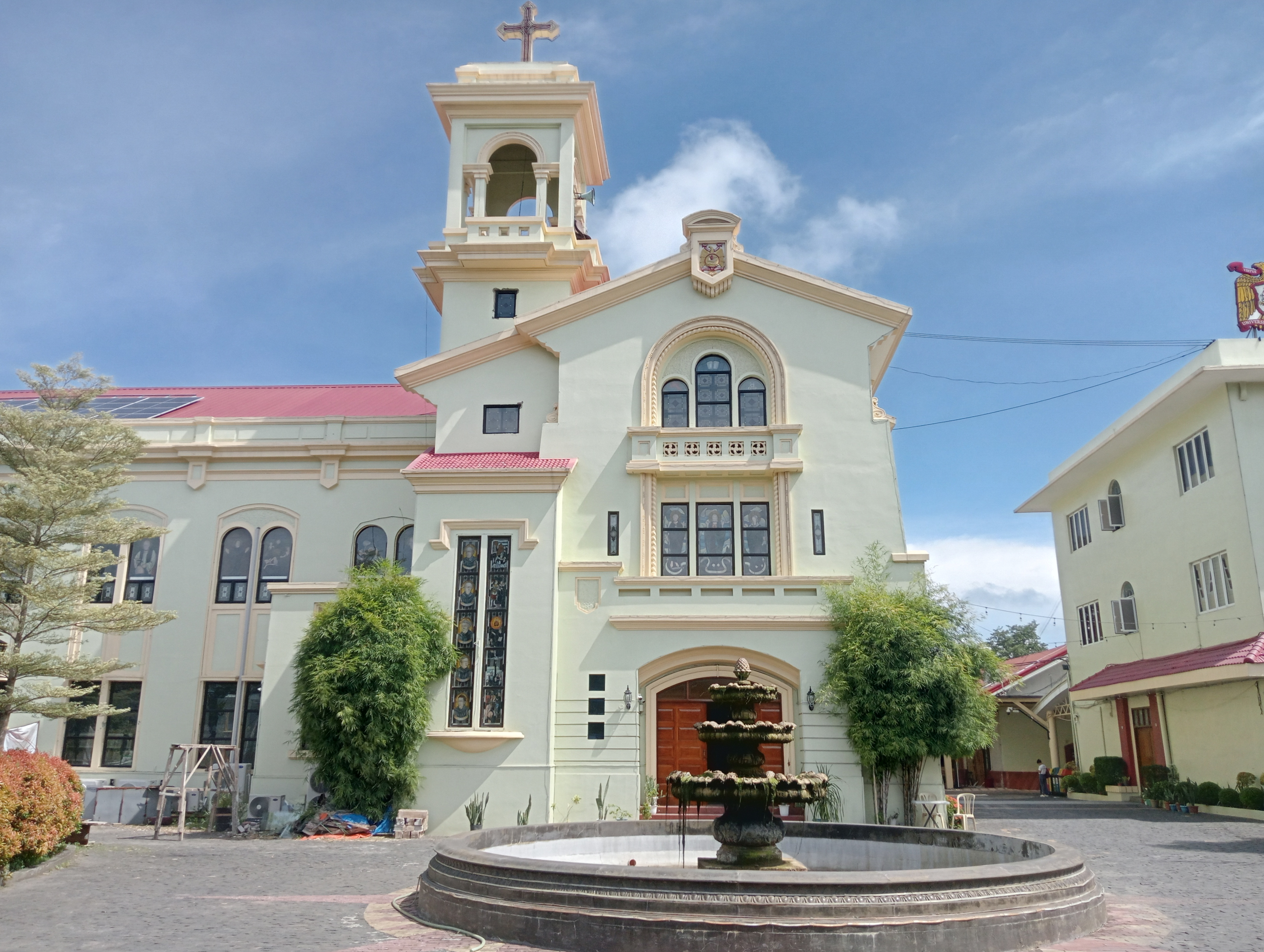
University of San Agustin Chapel

Recent developments in 1980s to early 2000s of the university include the establishment of various research and communication centers, namely: The Institute for Augustinian Studies, Villanova Institute for Social Science Research and Cultural Studies, Mendel Institute for Natural Science and Technology Research, and Institute for Social Development Issues and Initiatives.

Over the years, school enrollment has increased, resulting in the decision to move the high school department to a new campus in the suburbs of Sambag, Jaro in June 1995.

In contrast to the Philippine government's implementation of the K+12 basic education program, which adds an additional two years of senior high education after a student graduates from high school, the university has reorganized and merged its tertiary schools and colleges. The College of Nursing and the College of Pharmacy and Medical Technology merged to become the College of Health and Allied Medical Professions (CHAMP). The College of Architecture and Design and the College of Engineering merged to form the College of Technology (COT). The College of Arts and Sciences and the College of Education merged into the College of Liberal Arts, Sciences, and Education (CLASE). Meanwhile, the College of Law maintained its structure, and the College of Business Administration and Accountancy was renamed the College of Commerce.

== University Rectors and Presidents ==
| No. | Name | Term |
|---|---|---|
| 1st Rector | Fr. Bernabe Jiménez, OSA | 1904 - 1914 |
| 2nd Rector | Fr. Nicolas Merino, OSA | 1914 - 1922 |
| 3rd Rector | Fr. Mariano Cil, OSA | 1922 - 1926 |
| 4th Rector | Fr. Francisco Alvarado, OSA | 1926 - 1929 |
| 5th Rector | Fr. Vidal Yraeta, OSA | 1929 - 1935 |
| 6th Rector | Fr. Melecio Polo, OSA | 1935 - 1939 |
| 7th Rector | Fr. Dolse García, OSA | 1939 -1946; 1949 - 1954 |
| 8th Rector | Fr. Mariano Sapiña, OSA | 1946 - 1949 |
| 9th Rector | Fr. Isaac Insunza, OSA | 1954 - 1959 |
| 10th Rector | Fr. Bienvenido Junquera, OSA | 1959 - 1964 |
| 11th Rector | Fr. Nicanor Lana, OSA | 1964 - 1967; 1967 - 1970 |
| 12th Rector | Fr. Luis Merino, OSA | 1970 - 1971 |
| 13th Rector | Fr. Juan Manuel Chaguaceda, OSA | 1971 - 1974 |
| 14th Rector | Fr. Ambrosio Galindez, OSA | 1974 - 1979 |
| 15th Rector | Fr. Eduardo Pérez, OSA | 1979 - 1982 |
| 1st President | Fr. Bernardino Ricarfente, OSA | 1982 - 1986; 1986 - 1988 |
| 2nd President | Fr. Mamerto Alfeche, OSA | 1988 - 1992 |
| 3rd President | Fr. Eusebio Berdon, OSA | 1992 - 1996 |
| 4th President | Fr. Mamerto Alfeche, OSA | 1996 - 2000 |
| 5th President | Fr. Rodolfo Arreza, OSA | 2000 - 2002 |
| 6th President | Fr. Manuel Vergara, OSA | 2002 - 2008 |
| 7th President | Fr. Raul Marchan, OSA | 2008 - 2012 |
| 8th President | Fr. Frederick Comendador, OSA | 2012 - 2024 |
| 9th President | Fr. Arnel Dizon, OSA | 2024 - present |

== Research and extension ==
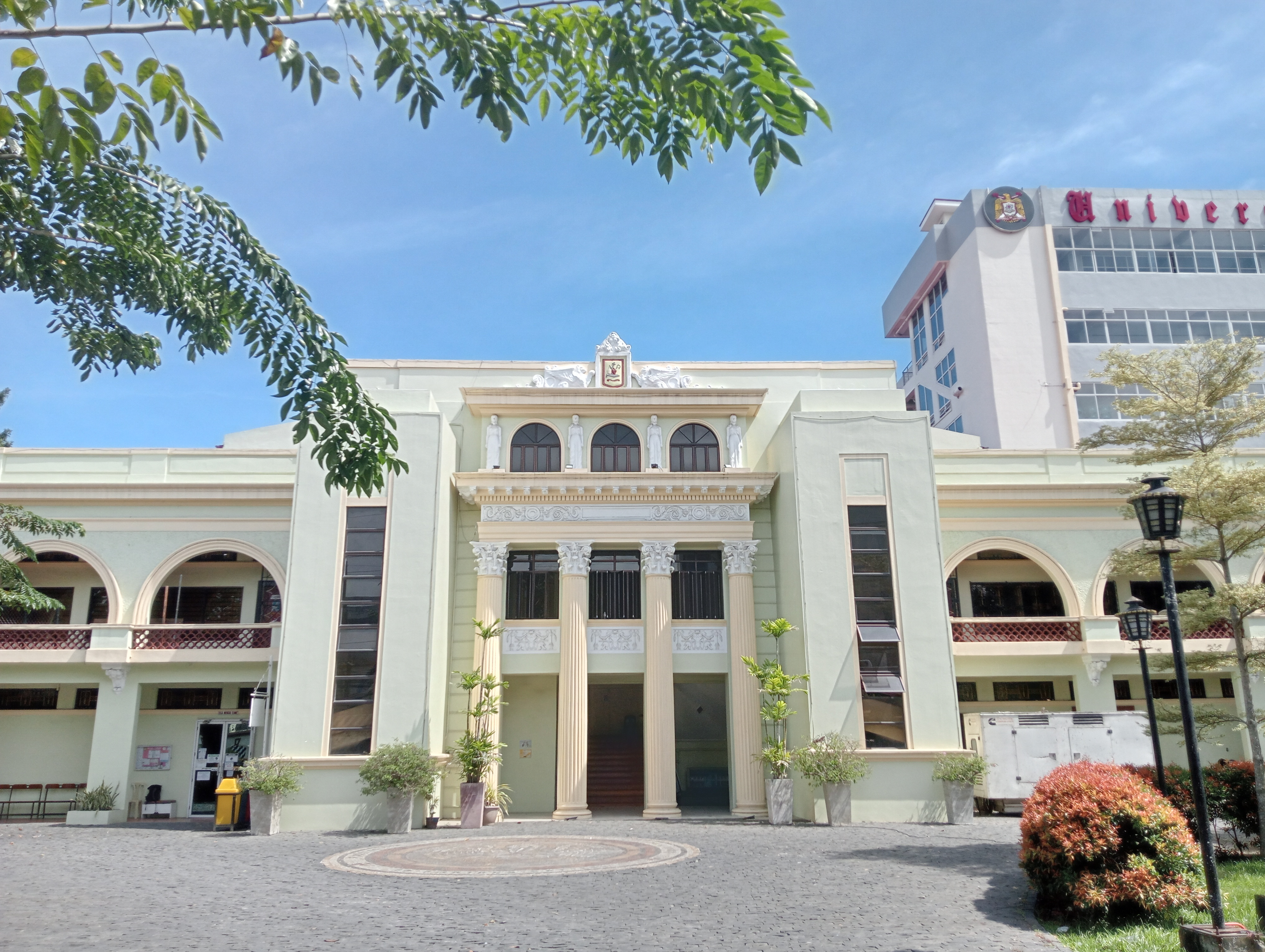
Urdaneta Hall, houses the university auditorium, medical clinic, dental clinic, clinical lab, and the College of Pharmacy and Medical Technology

Concurrent to the academic undertakings of the faculty and students, as a small-size research university, the University of San Agustin has adequate research centers each with their own focus of scientific and fields of studies. Several of such said centers were established in consortium with Philippine government agencies like the Department of Science and Technology (Philippines).

- USA Institute for Augustinian Studies
- USA Villanova Institute for Social Science Research and Cultural Studies
- USA Mendel Institute for Natural Science and Technology Research
- USA Institute for Social Development Issues and Initiatives
- USA Center for Informatics (CFI)
- Center for Advance New Materials Engineering and Emerging Technologies (CANMEET)
- USA Center for Heritage and Indigenous Cultures (CHIC)
- USA Center for Chemical Biology and Biotechnology (C2B2)
- USA Center for Natural Drug Discovery and Development (CND3)
- USA DOST-PCHRD Tuklas Lunas National Magnetic Resonance Laboratory Visayas
- USA Mass Spectrometry Imaging Laboratory

== Cultures and traditions ==
=== Patron Saint ===
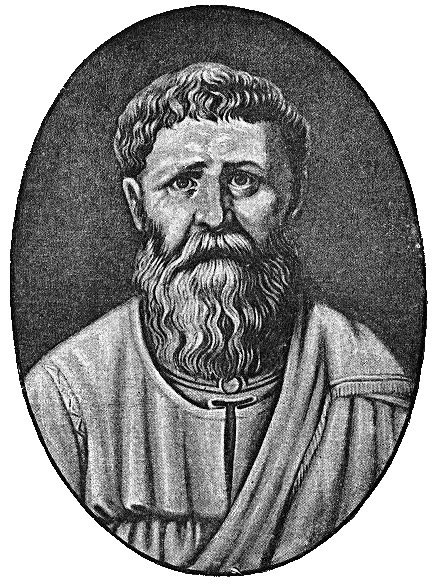
St. Augustine of Hippo as pictured during the Renaissance

The university is named in honor of fourth century saint Augustine of Hippo, a key figure in the doctrinal development of Western Christianity and a Doctor of the Church. Two of his surviving works, "The Confessions" (his autobiography) and "The City of God," are regarded as Western classics. Augustine is often considered to be one of the theological fountainheads of the Reformation because of his teaching on salvation and grace. Martin Luther, perhaps the greatest figure of the Reformation, was himself an Augustinian friar.

Other English speaking Augustinian Schools with the same patron saint include Colegio San Agustin-Makati, Colegio del Santo Niño (Cebu), Colegio San Agustin-Bacolod, Colegio San Agustin-Biñan, St. Augustine's College, Brookvale in Sydney, Australia, St. Augustine College Preparatory School, Richland, New Jersey; St. Augustine High School, San Diego, California; and Agustin Preparatory School in Reading, Massachusetts – all three in the United States; and St Augustine College in Malta.

=== University seal ===
Symbols and meanings in the University of San Agustin's seal:

- The Eagle represents the lofty intellect of St. Augustine as the soaring "Eagle of Hippo."
- The Heart symbolizes love and charity—the first rule of St. Augustine.
- The Crosier and the Mitre These are the symbols of the Bishopric of Saint Augustine.
- The Book stands for the attributes lavished on St. Augustine as a profound and prolific writer and the greatest Doctor of the Church.
- Tolle Lege, Tolle Lege (Take up and read) were the words heard from the void by St. Augustine, leading to his conversion to Catholicism in Milan in 387.
- Colors: Red stands for courage and gold for victory over evil in this world.
- Virtus et Scientia (Virtue and Knowledge) is the traditional motto of the Augustinians, representing the two pillars of the Augustinian way of education.
- University of San Agustin. The University of San Agustin, which is emblazoned in the Seal, is an institution of learning dedicated to the education of the youth in the Augustinian way of life.

=== Core Augustinian Values ===
- CARITAS (Charity)
- UNITAS (Unity)
- VERITAS (Truth)

=== Kasanag sa Paskwa ===
"Kasanag" (KaSANAG), a portmanteau of words "Ka" and "SanAg" (a colloquial of San Agustin), which also means bright or light in Hiligaynon language, and sa "Paskwa" (Hiligaynon translation of Christmas), which if combined is translated as Light in Christmas in English language, is a yuletide festival of lights which happens every December on the main campus of University San Agustin. The said holiday event include carnival rides fair, musical plays, Christmas variety shows and singing contests and concerts held by the university's schools and colleges. A fireworks display and traditional switching on of Christmas lights are showcased on its opening night.

== Publications ==
=== The Augustinian Mirror ===
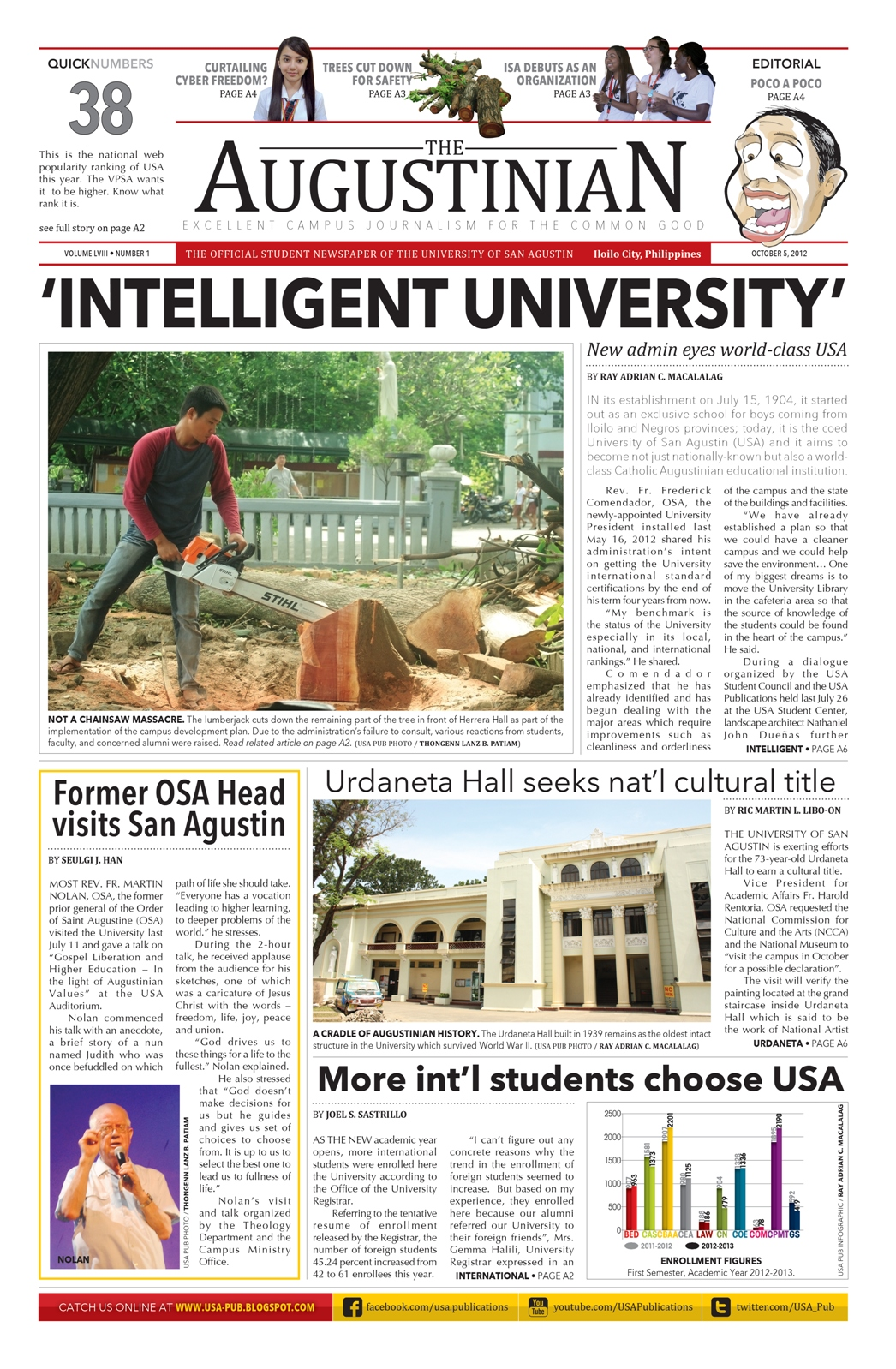
The Augustinian October 2012 issue, awarded as Best College Newspaper in the 3rd National Campus Press Awards

The Augustinian Mirror is the official student magazine of the University of San Agustin. It was also adopted as the official name of the student publication of the elementary department of Colegio San Agustin-Makati (founded 1969), a sister school of the University of San Agustin in the nation's metropolitan capital region.

It is published twice a year (once every semester) by the USA Publications. Founded in 1928, it is one of the country's oldest and most prestigious campus magazines. Among its chief goals are to nurture young literary minds and social achievers in the fields of literature, journalism, philosophy, theology, law and governance. The plan to establish a school publication was initiated in 1927. Although it was officially founded in 1928, the maiden issue first came out in 1929. It started as a news-oriented tabloid that covered annual events and activities of the university in English and Spanish. Being one of the earliest post-colonial Catholic publications in the Philippines, it was exhibited in the exposition of the Catholic Press at the Vatican in 1936. During World War II, it ceased operation as school authorities decided to close the university at a time of great uncertainty.

The post-war volume of 1945 saw the gradual change to its present format as a news magazine complemented with works of fiction, column writing and poetry in four subdivided sections: English, Filipino, Hiligaynon and Spanish. In 1946, the publication gained its first female editor. A complementary newspaper, The Augustinian, was established in 1954 focusing on news events in the university. It became a vehicle for students and faculty members to express their opinions on campus and socio-political issues. In 2006, a literary journal, Irong-Irong, was launched as a student medium for creative writing.

Over the years, The Augustinian Mirror has evolved into a theme-oriented publication. It has won countless awards and distinctions for excellence in news writing, human rights, tourism and travel in the past decades. It is a three-time recipient of the Gawad Lopez Jaena Award for "excellence in campus journalism," the highest distinction given by the government-run Philippine Information Agency (PIA). It has also won nine times the distinction of being adjudged the "best college magazine" in Western Visayas by COPRE (College Press Conference) and has been cited by the National Collegiate Press as one of the three best campus magazines of the Philippines in the 1970s. It has produced outstanding writers who later went on to become recipients of the Carlos Palanca Memorial Awards for Literature. After numerous journalism awards for nineteen consecutive years, it was granted in 2006 the right to hand out its own awards known as the SanAg Campus Press Awards.

=== The Junior Augustinian ===
(Official Publication of Junior High School Department)

=== The Eaglet ===
(Official Publication of Grade School/Elementary Department)

== Notable alumni ==
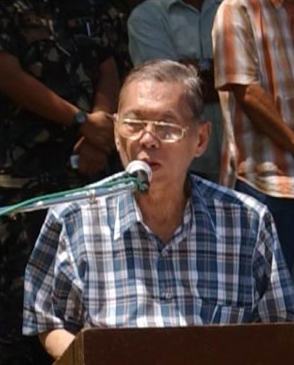
Former Philippine Secretary of Justice, Raul Gonzalez Sr.

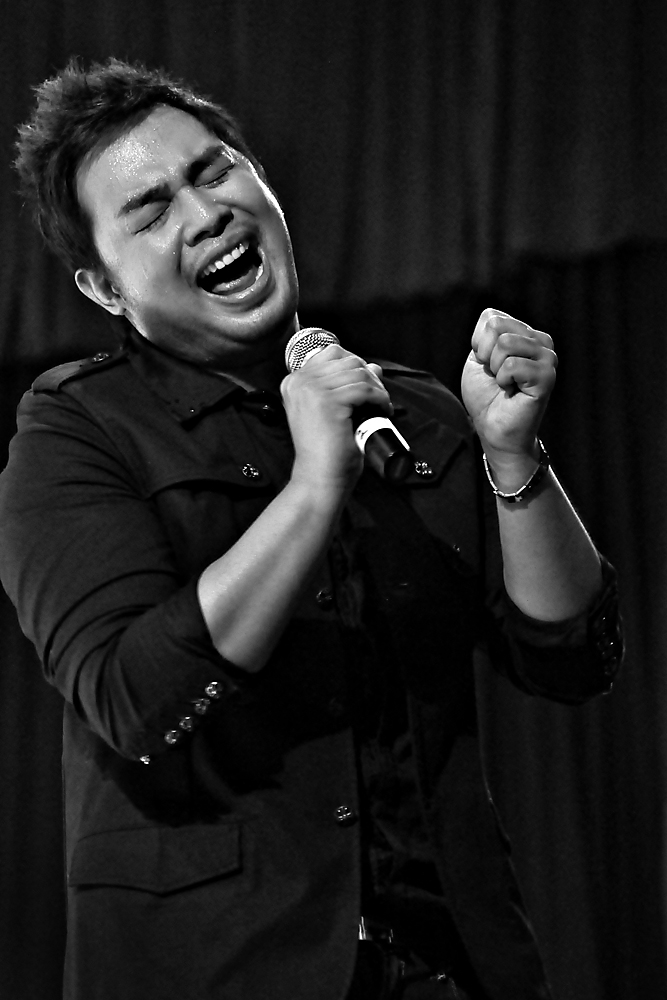
Television presenter, singer-songwriter and recording artist, Jed Madela.

People who are alumni, professors, and others associated with the University are called as Augustinians, Agustinians or Agustino. Notable alumni of the university include:

- Raul Gonzalez – Chief Presidential Legal Counsel, and former Secretary of Justice of the Philippines.
- Edgar Sia – Chinese Filipino businessman who founded the fast food restaurant chain, Mang Inasal (dropped out)
- Rogelio M. Florete – businessman, founded and owns the Florete Group of Companies and Bombo Radyo Philippines, one of the largest radio networks in the Philippines
- Wilfredo Segovia – former College Editors Guild of the Philippines national president and founder of The Segovia Group, a civil-structural consultancy firm in the Asia-Pacific region
- Jobert Peñaflorida / Jobert Yap – former news anchor of TV Patrol Panay and host of Sikat Ka! Iloilo.
- Zaldy Trespeses – Associate Justice, Sandiganbayan.
- Evalyn Ursua – women's rights advocate and lawyer for Suzette Nicolas during the Subic rape case.
- Isidoro Cruz – Palanca Memorial Award for Literature recipient.
- Miriam Defensor-Santiago – Filipino Senator, first female agrarian reform secretary of the Philippines, first female Commissioner of Immigration and Deportation of the Philippines, and first Asian to be elected as judge of the International Criminal Court.
- John Iremil Teodoro – Filipino writer and Palanca Memorial Award for Literature recipient and awardee.
- Jed Madela – television presenter, and singer-songwriter.
- Henry O. Chusuey – Chinese-Filipino hotel and resort business magnate (Hennan Hotels and Resorts).
- Carolina Griño-Aquino – former presiding justice of the Court of Appeals of the Philippines. She served on the Supreme Court as an Associate Justice from 2 February 1988 until 22 October 1993. Griño-Aquino was also the fourth woman who served as an Associate Justice of Supreme Court of the Philippines.
- Resurreccion Borra – former commissioner and acting chairman of the Philippine Commission on Elections and National Judicial Excellence Awardee during the Supreme Court's Centenary in 2001
- Richard Garin Jr. – Congressman.

== See also ==
- Colegio San Agustin-Bacolod
- Colegio San Agustin-Makati
- Colegio San Agustin-Biñan
