= Augustinian Province of the Most Holy Name of Jesus of the Philippines =

Subdivision of the Order of St. Augustine

The Province of the Most Holy Name of Jesus of the Philippines (Spanish: Provincia Agustiniana del Santísimo Nombre de Jesús de Filipinas) was a geographical and administrative subdivision of the religious Order of St. Augustine that was formally affiliated to the Order on March 7, 1575, to originally cater the needs of the growing Augustinian presence in Philippines who were serving Filipinos in more than 300 towns in the 16th century. The Province later on expanded its presence in East Asia, Africa and the Americas in the 20th century to help build and serve more communities. It was considered to be the largest province in the whole Augustinian Order, with more than 300 affiliated Augustinian friars working in The Philippines, Spain, Tanzania, India, Venezuela, Peru, Costa Rica, El Salvador, Honduras, and China, according to a 2018 statistic from the Province.

The Province formally ceased to exist and was formally merged with three other Spanish Augustinian Provinces during the 186th Ordinary General Chapter of the Order of Saint Augustine in Rome on September 16, 2019, to create a unified Spanish Augustinian Province of San Juan de Sahagun, a move which aims to restore the Augustinian Order in Spain, which had been in decline prior to the decision.

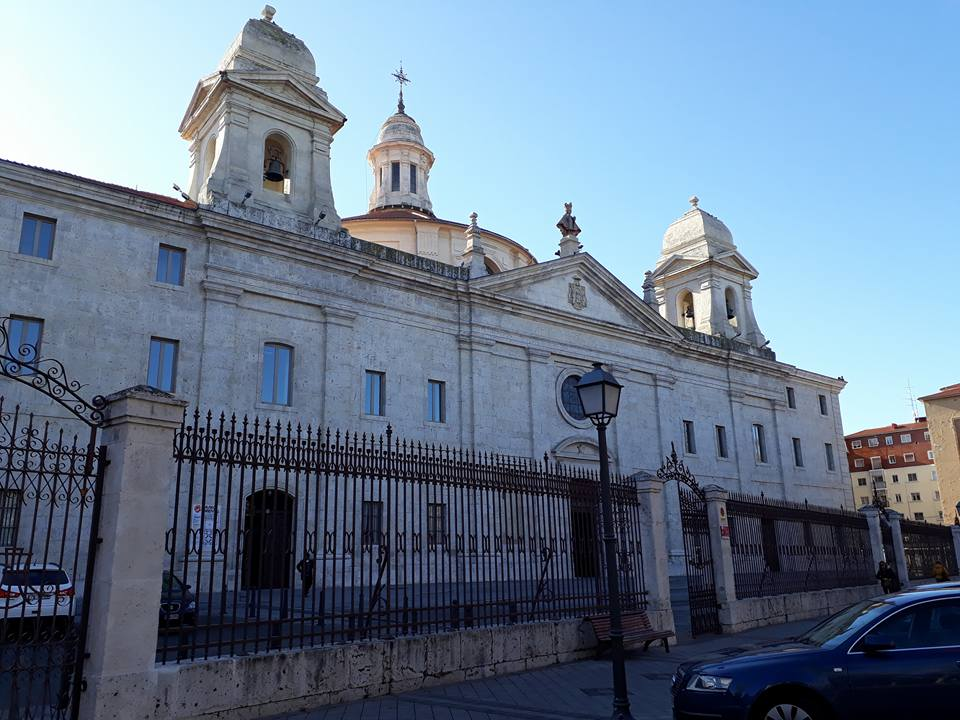
Facade

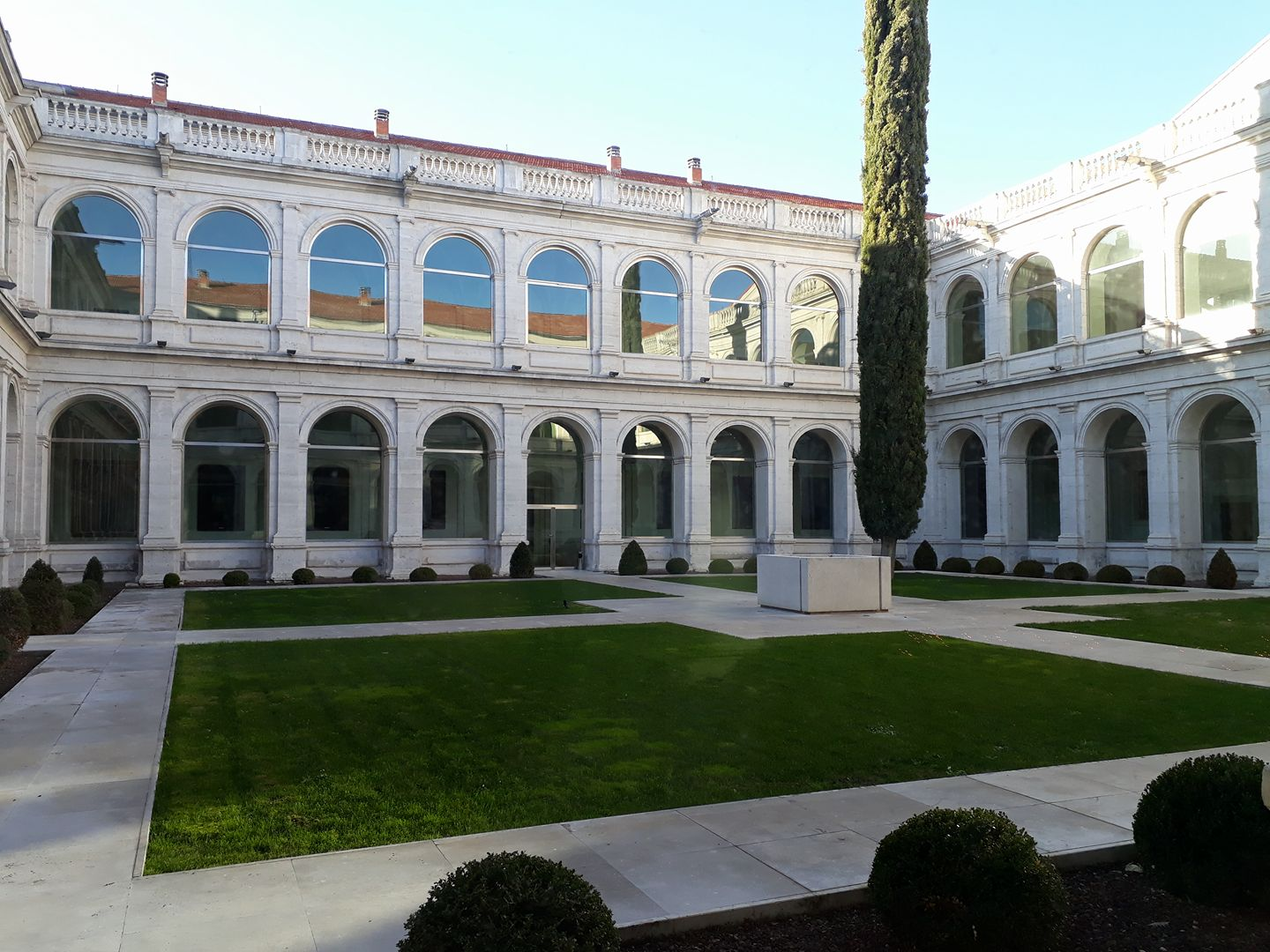
Cloister

The Monastery of the Augustinian Province of the Most Holy Name of Jesus of the Philippines in Valladolid, Spain, also known as the Real Colegio de Agustinos Filipinos

== The Spanish Exploration ==
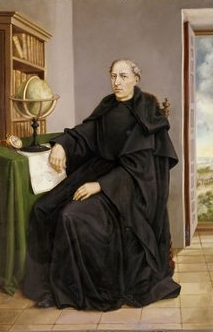
Lithograph image as an Augustinian Friar

Andrés de Urdaneta, circumnavigator and Augustinian friar

In 1565, Adelantado Miguel López de Legazpi arrived in the Philippines at the head of an expedition sent by Viceroy Luís de Velasco of New Spain to discover islands west of the Moluccas upon the orders of Philip II of Spain. Enlisted to guide the perilous voyage was the famed navigator Andrés de Urdaneta (b. 1498 - d. June 3, Mexico, 1568), an Augustinian friar.

Although a veteran of previous voyages across the Pacific, Father Urdaneta was reluctant to take part in the expedition, let alone command it. When he declined the offer to lead, the responsibility fell upon the shoulders of Legazpi. Already in his sixties and in poor health, Urdaneta considered himself retired as a navigator especially after having earlier turned his back on the world by joining the Augustinian Order in Mexico.

Having ascended to the Spanish throne, When King Philip II of Spain ordered his men to concentrate their efforts on the Philippines, a move that was also meant to avoid further conflict with the Portuguese, the main Spanish rival in this period of the Age of Discovery. When Philip II ordered the viceroy to "prepare a fleet of discovery" of the western islands near the Moluccas and wrote Urdaneta a letter asking him to guide the voyage, he felt compelled to obey for "the glory of God and the expansion of our faith." Urdaneta's expertise and experience proved essential to keeping them on course.

== Augustinians: First Catholic Missionaries in the Philippines ==
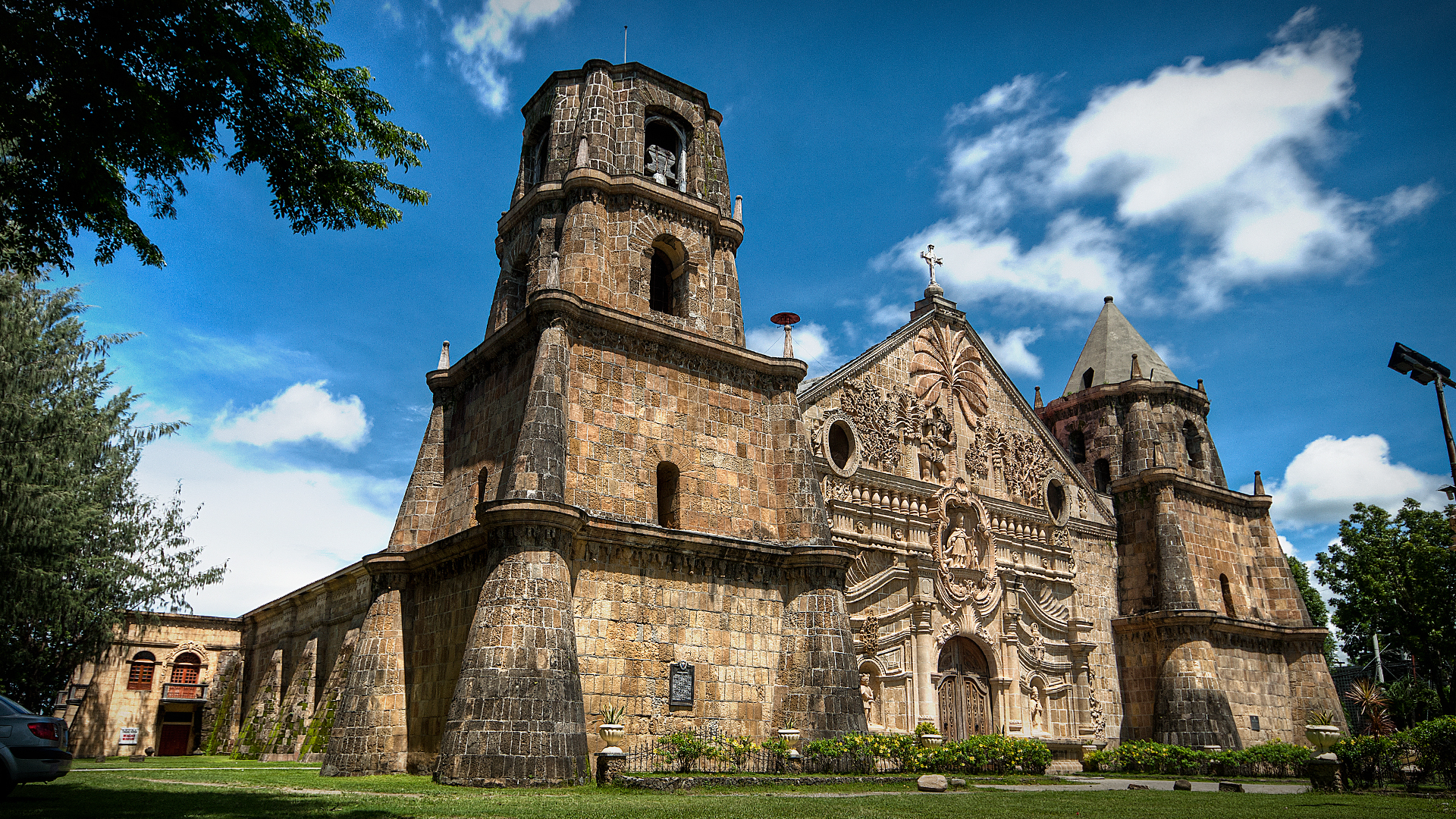
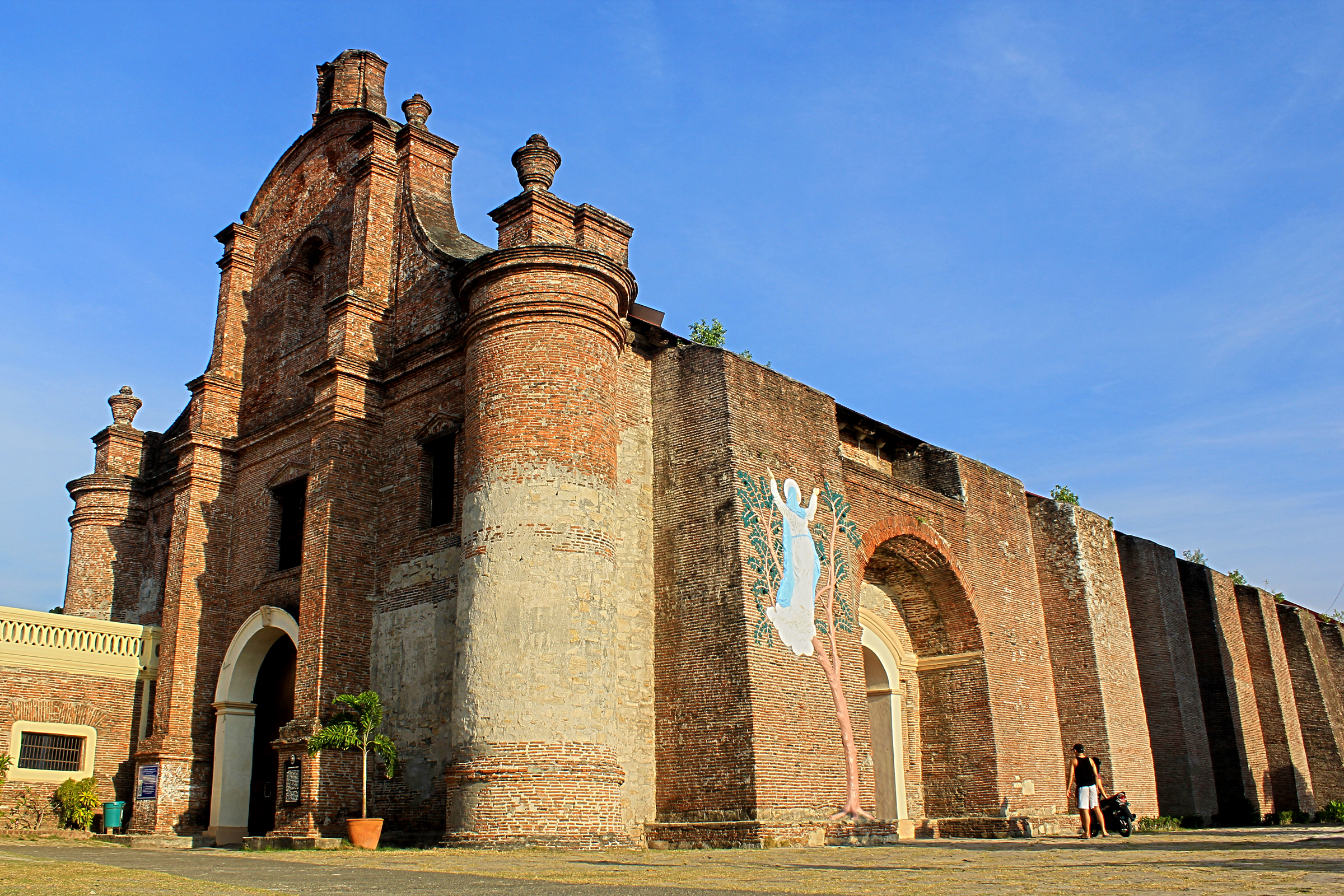
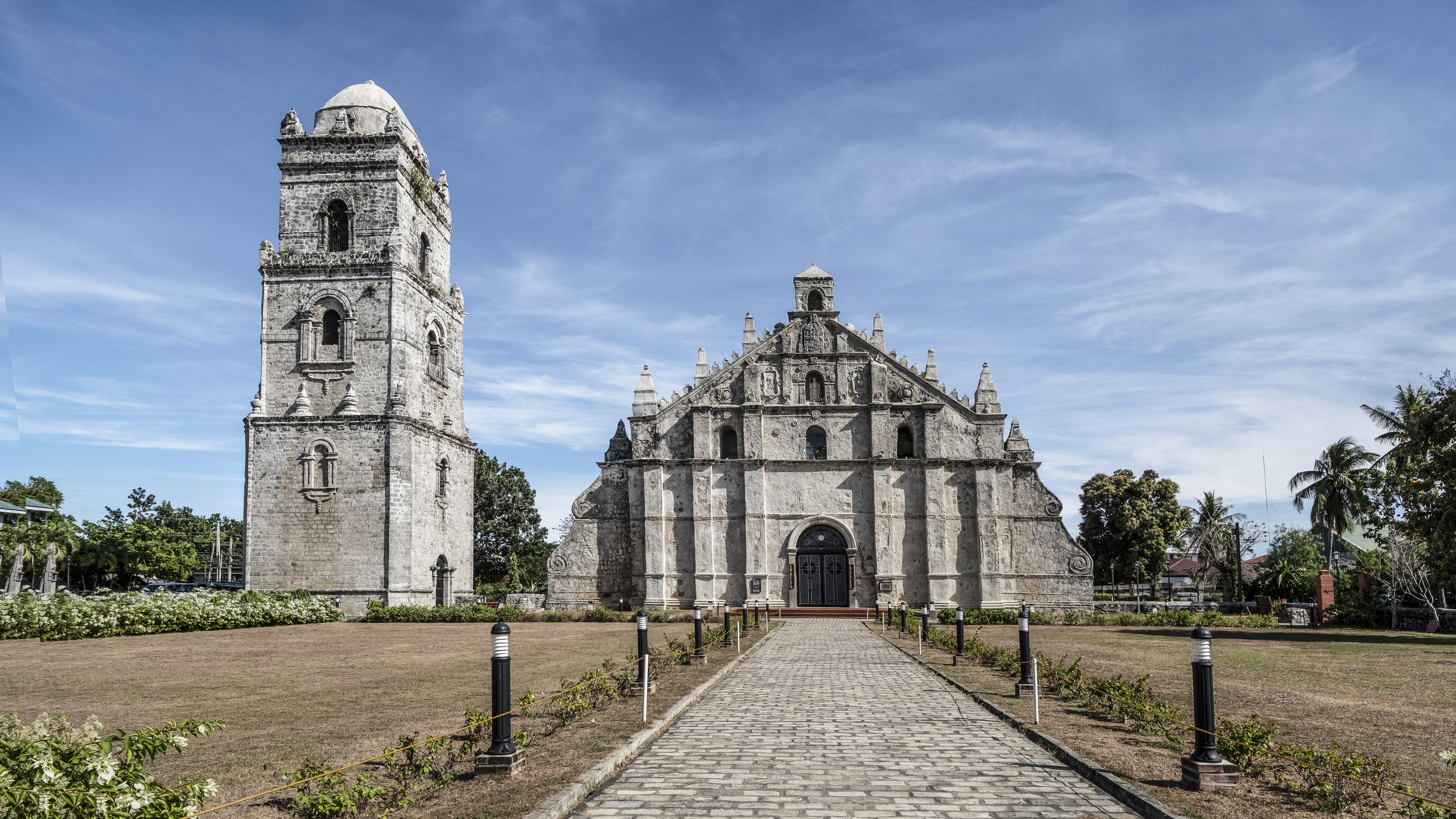
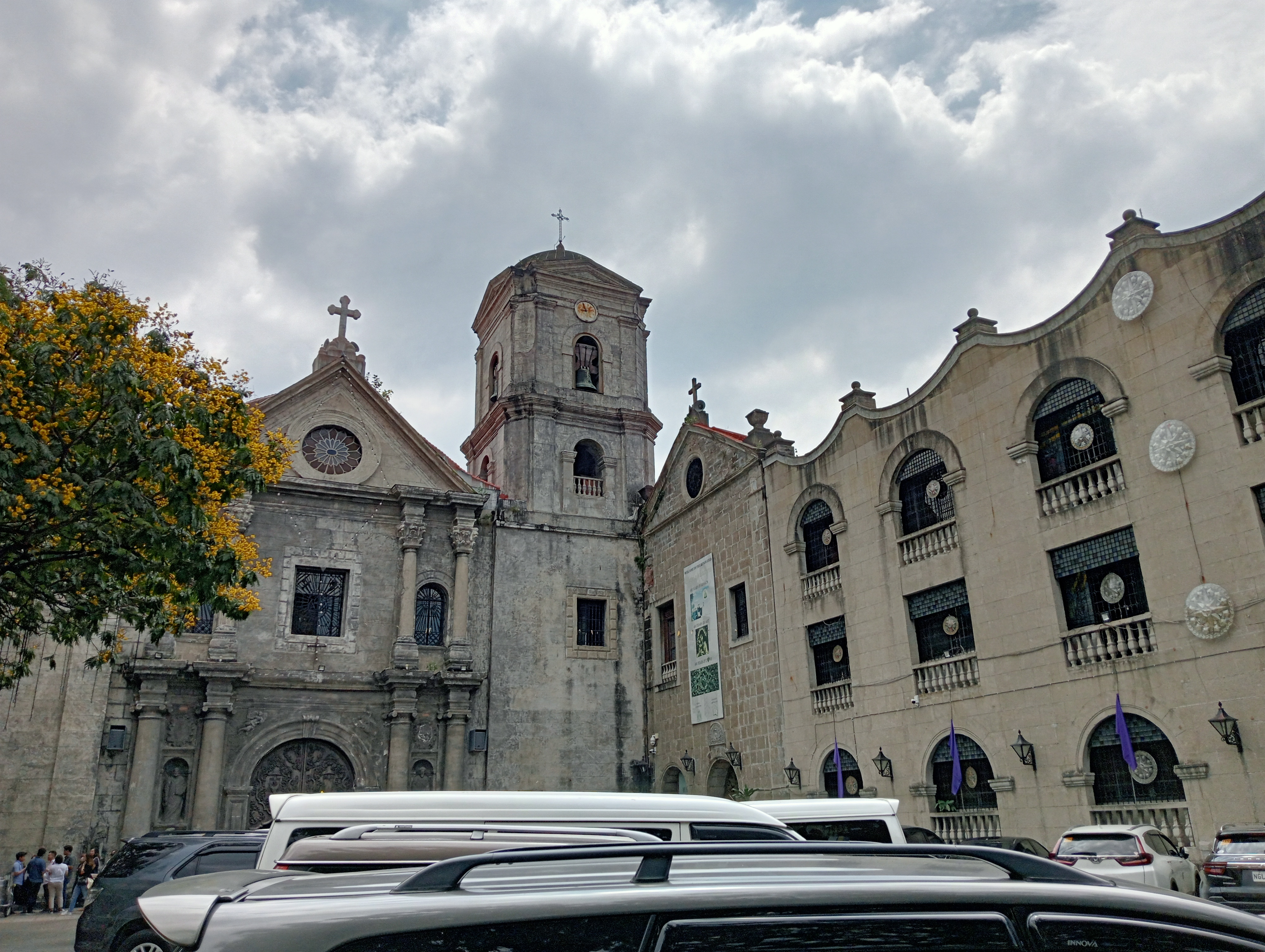
UNESCO World Heritage Churches built by the Augustinians. Clockwise from upper left: Miag-ao Church in Iloilo, Church of Our Lady of the Assumption in Santa Maria, Ilocos Sur, Paoay Church in Ilocos Norte and San Augustine Church in Intramuros, Manila

Urdaneta and four other Augustinians, Martín de Rada (b. 1533 - d. 1578), Diego de Herrera, Pedro de Gamboa and Andrés de Aguirre, started a successful apostolate in Cebú as soon as they landed in April 1565. Legazpi founded the first Spanish settlement there in a spot where his men had stumbled upon a statue of the Child Jesus in a burnt hut. The Spaniards considered it miraculous to have found the statue, a gift from Ferdinand Magellan to the wife of the rajah of Cebu after her conversion to Catholicism in 1521. He named the place Villa del Santísimo Nombre de Jésus in honor of the Holy Child. Urdaneta founded the first churches in the Philippines, the St. Vitales Church and the Basilica del Santo Niño; he served as the first prelate of the Church in Cebu. Urdaneta was considered a "protector of the Indians" for his treatment of the Philippine natives. In June 1565, he and Andrés de Aguirre returned to the monastery in Mexico City to report on their experience. In 1567 he requested to return to the Philippines and continue his missionary work but was refused by his superior because of his age. He died at the friary in Mexico City on June 3, 1568.

== Formation of a New Province ==
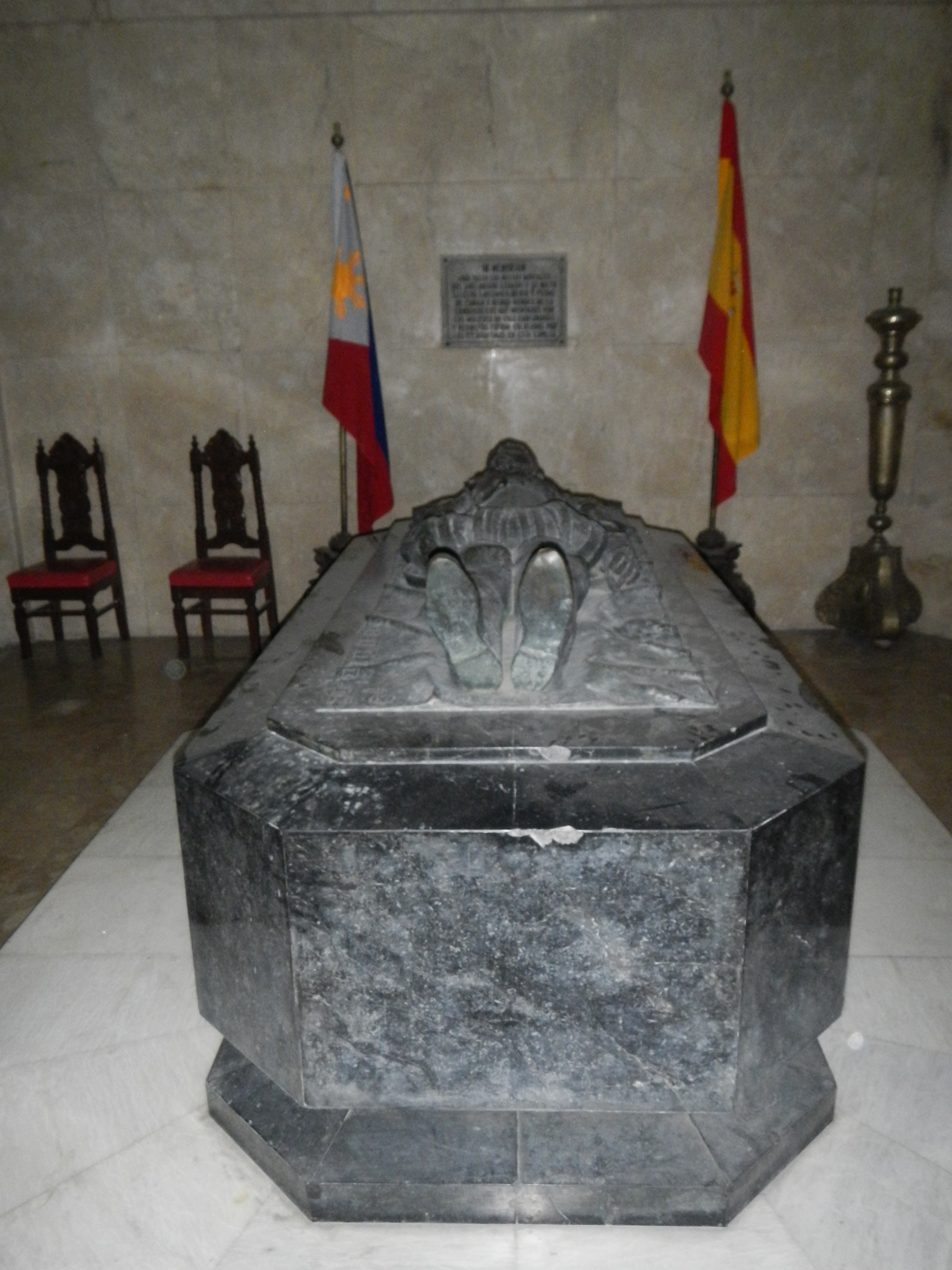
Tomb of the Adelantado Miguel López de Legazpi in San Agustin Church, Intramuros, Manila.

When Urdaneta and Aguirre returned to Mexico, De Rada, Herrera, and Gamboa remained and quickly learned the local Cebuano language. In 1566–67, Rada made voyages to nearby islands to preach. In Manila, the Augustinians had been given a piece of land within the walled city of Intramuros to build a church and a monastery. The original San Agustin Church, built of bamboo and nipa, was completed in 1571.

=== Provincial chapters ===
The first provincial chapter of the Province of the Most Holy Name of Jesus of the Philippines was held at San Agustin Church on May 3, 1572, which elected Fray Martin de Rada, OSA as the province's first prior provincial. Rada denounced abuses committed by Spanish authorities against the local population and reported these to Philip ll. His vigorous advocacy for justice has earned him a place in history as the "Defender of the Natives." A key document in this matter was his Parecer del Provincial fray Martín de Rada, agustino, sobre las cosas de estas tieras ("Opinions of Provincial Father Martin de Rada, augustinian friar, about the things of this land"), dated at Manila, June 21, 1575.

=== Establishment of the Augustinian Province in the Philippines ===
In 1575, under the leadership of Father Alfonso Gutierez, 24 Spanish Augustinians landed in the islands and, with the guidance of both Fathers Herrera and Rada, worked very successfully, at first as itinerant preachers. Their missionary zeal played a pivotal role in the evolution of the archipelago into today's only Catholic nation in Asia. In 1575, then Prior General of the Order, Fr. Tadeo de Perusa, issued a decree formally establishing the new Augustinian Province in the Philippines which was to be known as the Province of the Most Holy Name of Jesus of the Philippines (Santisimo Nombre de Jesus de Filipinas). To provide a steady source of missionaries to the Philippines following the founding of the province, a seminary was created in Valladolid, Spain. Franciscans first appeared in the Philippines in 1577 and were welcomed by the Augustinians. Soon they were joined by Dominicans and Jesuits.

=== Discalced Augustinians in the Philippines ===
Sent by Philip III, the first Discalced Augustinians landed in 1606. All these Orders shared in the work and challenges of the missions. Protected by Spain, they prospered, and their missionary efforts became more and more successful. In 1773 the Jesuits, however, were obliged to give up their missions in consequence of the suppression of the Society.

=== Headquarters ===
San Agustín Church and Monastery served as the province's headquarters for more than 300 years. It is also where the Adelantado Miguel López de Legazpi is buried.

=== 17th century Augustinian friars in the Philippines ===
Casimiro Diaz provides an account of the Augustinian friars in the Philippines between 1641 and 1670 in his Conquistas. During the chapter session of 1641, Fray Gerónimo de Medrano is chosen as prior provincial. Shortly after, Archbishop Guerrero passes away, and Diaz includes a summary of his life and character. Three years later, Medrano is replaced by Fray Alonso Carvajal, while Diego Fajardo assumes the role of governor of the islands. On April 16, 1644, following the timeline prescribed by their holy rules, the provincial chapter of the province convened at the convent of San Pablo in Manila.

Father Fray Gerónimo de Medrano had led the province with great success during his second term, earning widespread regret when his tenure ended and a strong desire among many for his continued leadership. This wish was fulfilled in 1650, when he was elected for a third term. On May 9, 1650, the voting fathers convened in chapter at the convent in Manila and elected Father Fray Gerónimo de Medrano as provincial for the third time. Known for his exceptional virtue and prudence, Medrano left a lasting legacy.

After considerable effort, the Augustinians manage to send a procurator to Spain to secure additional missionaries. Casimiro Diaz recounts the events of 1651–52, focusing on the oppressive and unlawful actions of Fajardo’s confidant, Venegas, and his eventual downfall. This outcome is attributed to the bravery of Provincial Geronimo de Medrano, who formally lodged a complaint against Venegas with the governor.

=== Augustinian works ===
The missionaries of the Province have given the world valuable descriptive works on Asian countries and their peoples especially in the early days. Included in this key Augustinian contribution are Father Cipriano Navarro's important work on The Inhabitants of the Philippines and a monumental work in six volumes by Father Manuel Blanco titled Flora de Filipinas (Madrid, 1877--). Both works are valuable contributions to literature and learning. World-renowned botanist Father Blanco had built a botanical garden for his plant experiments in Intramuros that became the basis for his internationally acclaimed book. Augustinian friars made researches in the languages of the Philippine Islands including Diego Bergano, and José Sequi (d. 1844), a prominent missionary of the order. Many wrote grammars and compiled dictionaries.

=== Evangelization of native settlements ===
In Luzon, the Augustinians embarked upon the evangelization of native settlements and subsequently built churches in Calumpit, Malolos, Hagonoy, Bigaa, Guiguinto and Quingua in the province of Bulacan and in Lubao, Betis, Macabebe, Bacolor, San Fernando and Apalit in province of Pampanga.

== Economic, Social and Cultural Labors in Asia and Beyond ==
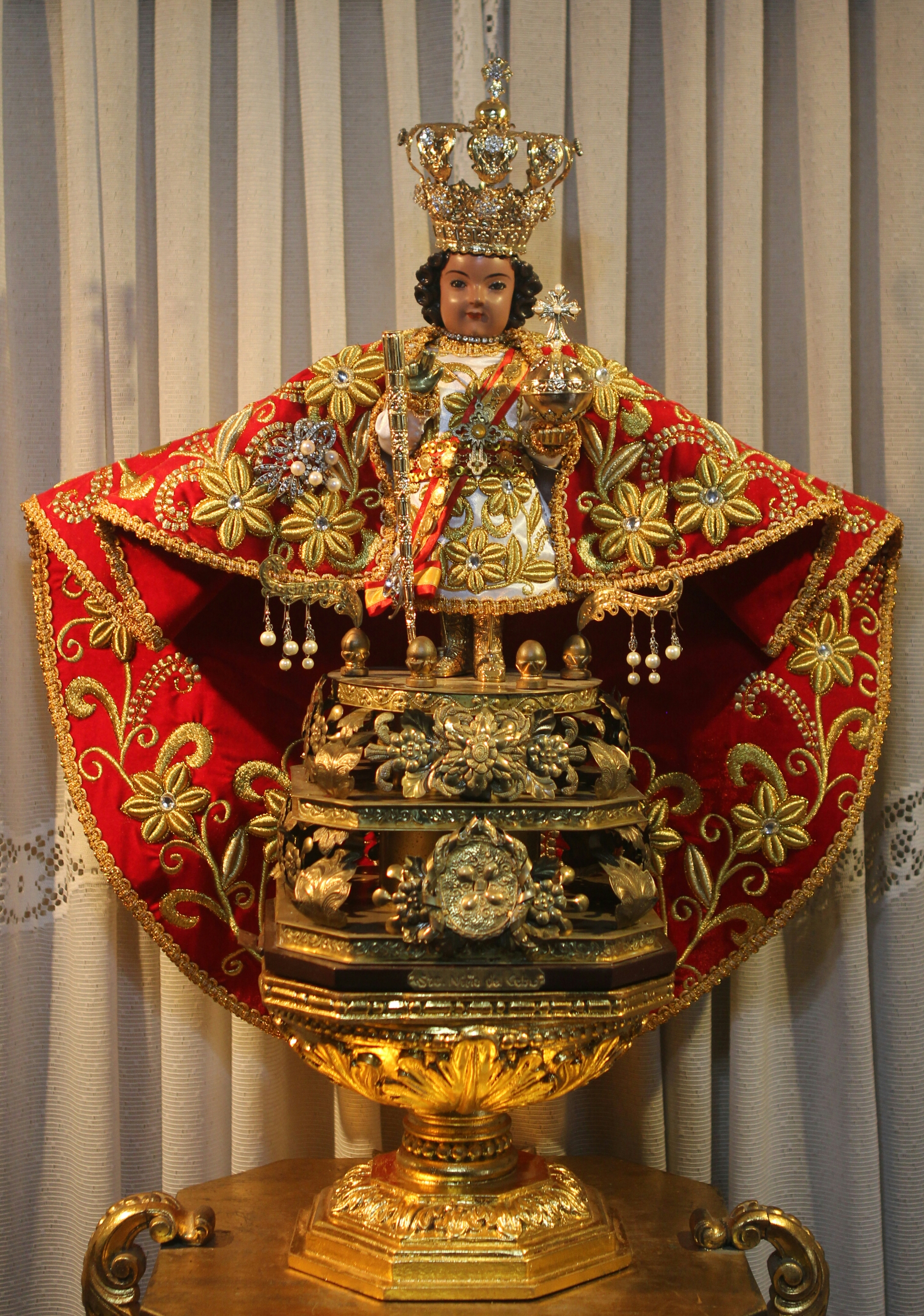
Image of the Santo Niño de Cebú

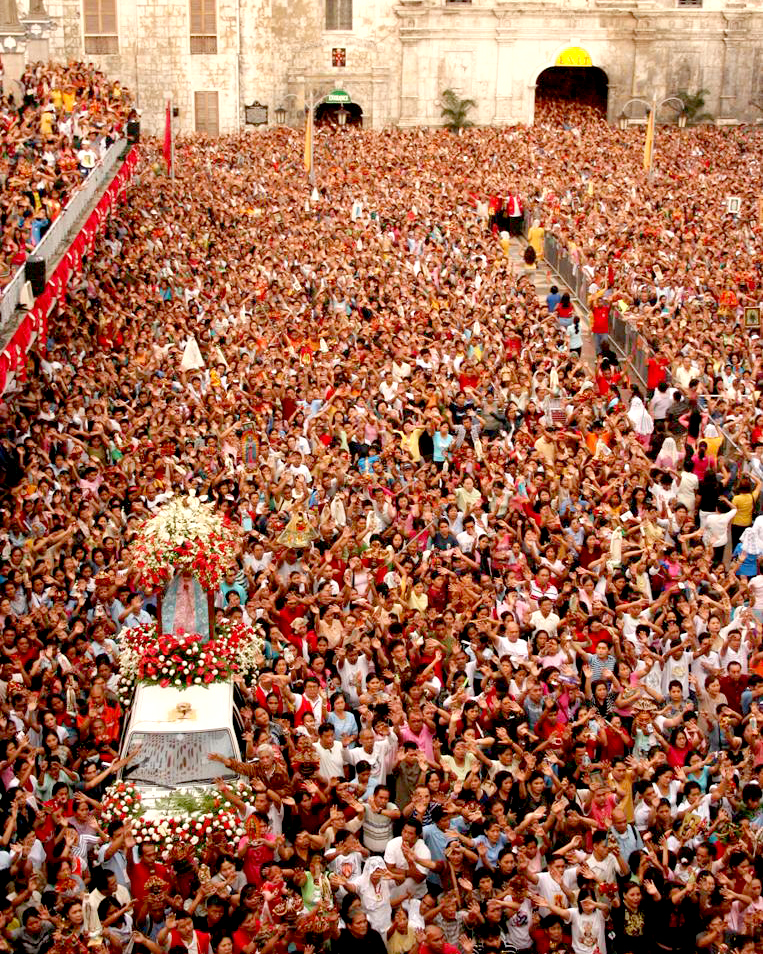
Devotees flock to the Basilica del Santo Niño for Friday devotional Masses and the Feast of the Holy Child

Devotion to the Santo Niño (Holy Child Jesus), a spiritual heritage left by the Augustinians in the Philippines

Since 1565 until the present, more than 3,000 Augustinian missionaries have dedicated themselves to apostolic, social, and cultural labor in the Philippines, China and Japan. The Augustinian missions in the Philippines have provided missionaries for the East since their first establishment. In 1603 some of them entered Japan, where several were martyred, and in 1653 others reached China, where in 1701 the Order had six missionary stations. Father Rada was one of those who visited China, and he reported extensively on his findings and impressions about the country. He is considered to be the first ambassador of the Philippines to China during colonial times.

Before the Philippine Revolution of 1896, the Augustinians administered over four hundred schools and churches in the islands scattered across the archipelago. In 1904 they established the University of San Agustin in Iloilo City that eventually emerged as the largest Augustinian educational institution in the world in terms of student population and the only Augustinian university in the Asia-Pacific region. They have also served as the custodians of the Santo Niño Shrine in Cebu City, which houses the centuries-old image of the Child Jesus recovered by Legazpi's men in 1565, within the Basilica del Santo Niño de Cebu.

On 12 August 1879, Pope Leo XIII, in the Breve Ex debito Pastoralis Officii, entrusted to the Augustinians of the Province of the Philippines the Mission of Northern Hunan in China. According to historical records, the Augustinians were able to establish main mission stations in three different areas: in Changteh (present-day Changde), Lichow (present-day Lixian) and Yochow (present-day Yueyang). Because of the effort of the Augustinians and the faithful of Northern Hunan, the mission was elevated to the Apostolic Vicariate of Northern Hunan in September 19 of the same year, which later on became the Apostolic Vicariate of Changteh on 3 December 1924. On 11 April 1946, the Apostolic Vicariate became the Diocese of Changde, under the Ecclesiastical province of Changsha. Several Augustinians from the Province of the Philippines also served as local ordinaries ever since 1879, like Fray Elias Suarez, OSA, Fray Saturnino de la Torre Merino, OSA, Fray Luis Perez Perez, OSA, Fray Agustin Gonzalez, OSA, Fray Juvencio Juan Hospital de la Puebla, OSA (before he resigned in 1917 to enter the Carthusian Order in 1919), Fray Angel Diego Carbajal, OSA and Fray Gerardo Faustino Herrero Garrote, OSA. Fray Michael Yang Gaojian, OSA, former superior of the Augustinians in China in the 1950s, was also consecrated as bishop of the Diocese of Changde but without any papal mandate. He entered the Augustinian Order in 1931, was ordained priest in 1938 and was consecrated as bishop by the Chinese Patriotic Catholic Association (CPCA) in October 1958.

The Province in 1968, also reestablished the Augustinian presence on the Indian subcontinent, which passing Augustinian missionaries first reached by way of Goa in 1542. Incidentally, these four men—Fathers Jeronimo de Santisteban, Nicolas de Alvarado, Sebastian Reina (or de Trasierra), and Alfonso de Alvarado—once they had returned to Spain, became the first four priests and members of a religious order to have sailed entirely around the world.

From its houses in Spain and its missions in the Philippines, the Province in the past had deployed missionaries to Brazil, Colombia, Peru, and Venezuela. At present, it is also actively involved in training and sending missionaries to Tanzania.

== The Province of the Philippines: A Prolific Mother ==
Throughout its lifetime, the Province of the Most Holy Name of Jesus of the Philippines became a prolific mother to other Augustinian circumscriptions worldwide who were in need of additional help for administering the faithful. Being the biggest province in the Order, the province helped and gave aid to the Province of Brazil, Province of Castille, Province of the Holy Name of Jesus of Spain, and the Provinces of Nuestra Señora de Gracia de Colombia and Nuestra Señora de Gracia de Peru, which enabled these provinces to revitalize itself. But the most famous province born out from the Province of the Philippines is the Augustinian Province of Santo Niño de Cebu, which is based in the Philippines.

== The Province of Santo Niño de Cebu and The Augustinian Vicariate of the Orient ==
At the turn of the twentieth century, the Province of the Most Holy Name of Jesus of the Philippines decided to shift its missionary activities to newer territories, such as Peru, Colombia, and Venezuela. As a logical consequence of this move, the presence of the province in the country was reduced to a Vicariate in 1926, the Augustinian Vicariate of the Philippines, to retain the presence of the Spanish province in the country, which moved its provincial seat from the Convento de San Agustin in Intramuros to the Casa Provincial de Andres de Urdaneta in Madrid. The Augustinian presence in the country was then reduced to a minimum.

To compensate for this loss of manpower, the remaining Augustinians intensified the recruitment and formation of Filipino candidates. And as the number of the latter increased and their preparedness adequately established, the idea of creating a new Province came to be seriously considered.

Plans for the organization of such a Province began in 1974 when the Regional Assembly of the Philippine Augustinian Vicariate asked for the creation of a Vice-Province in the islands. Though the plan was not realized, it was again revived by a group of Filipino Augustinians at a meeting in the Basilica Minore del Santo Niño in Cebu on April 29, 1981. The plan this time was for the creation of a new Province. The move to create a new Province, which would be called the Province of Sto. Niño de Cebu-Philippines, was officially endorsed by the Regional Assembly of the Augustinian Vicariate of the Philippines at the closing of its sessions on August 19, 1981, in the Monastery of San Agustin, Intramuros, Manila, and by the Provincial Chapter of the Province of the Most Holy Name of Jesus of the Philippines, held in Valladolid, Spain on July 17, 1982. The proposal was overwhelmingly approved by the members of the 174th General Chapter held in Rome on September 15, 1983, and the new province was canonically established on December 25, 1983.

The province of Cebu was officially formed on September 13, 1983, inside the Istituto Patristico Augustinianum in Rome during the 174th General Chapter of the Augustinian Order, where ninety-three delegates approved the creation of the first indigenous Augustinian province in Asia after over 400 years of control by Spanish religious leaders.

Even before the erection of the new province, the Spanish Province of the Most Holy Name of Jesus of the Philippines and the Order at large decided to create a new vicariate, The Augustinian Vicariate of the Orient, to continue the historical, traditional and cultural identity of the Spanish province in the country. The new name of the vicariate was also seen as fitting for its new mission, which is to propagate the Good News of Jesus Christ and to evangelize people in Eastern and Southeastern Asia and to reconnect with the mission in China and India. Two communities in the country were retained to the Vicariate of the Orient when the new province of Cebu was founded: San Agustin Church in Intramuros, Manila and Colegio San Agustin in Makati, while 2 other communities in India and 1 parish church in Hunan were also given to the Vicariate. All other Augustinian communities in the Philippines during this time were given to the Province of Cebu. As a consequence of the birth of the new province, the Province of the Philippines also had to rename itself as the Province of the Most Holy Name of Jesus of the Philippines of Spain to differentiate itself from the new Filipino Province of Cebu.

== Former Circumscriptions of the Province of the Most Holy Name of Jesus of the Philippines of Spain ==
Below is an updated list of all the circumscriptions that are dependent to the Province of the Most Holy Name of Jesus of the Philippines of Spain of the Order of Saint Augustine:

- The Circumscription of Spain (Spain)
- The Augustinian Vicariate of the Orient (Philippines and China)
- The Augustinian Vicariate of Our Lady of Grace (India)
- The Augustinian Vicariate of Iquitos (Peru)
- The Augustinian Vicariate of Venezuela (Venezuela)
- The Augustinian Delegation of Tanzania (Tanzania)
- The Augustinian Delegation of Centroamerica

== The Union of Augustinian Provinces of Spain ==
The Province of the Most Holy Name of Jesus of the Philippines of Spain was formally merged with three other Spanish Augustinian Provinces (Province of Castille, Province of the Sacred Heart of Jesus of Matritense, and Province of the Most Holy Name of Jesus of Spain) during the 186th Ordinary General Chapter of the Order of Saint Augustine in Rome on 16 September 2019 to create a unified Spanish Augustinian Province of St. John of Sahagun, a move which aims to restore the Augustinian Order in Spain, which has been in decline prior to the decision. As a consequence to the unification of these provinces, some of the province's circumscriptions or dependents have been elevated, like the Augustinian Vicariate of the Orient, which has been elevated as The Augustinian Province of the Most Holy Name of Jesus of the Philippines (a new, separate province from the Province of Cebu that took the old name of the Spanish Province of the Philippines), and the Delegation of Tanzania, which has been elevated as The Augustinian Vicariate of Tanzania.

== Former Houses ==
- Parroquia San Roque, Av. Maresme 139–141, Badalona, Spain 08913
- Convento de San José, Iparraguirre 24 48009, Bilbao, Bizkaia, Spain
- Colegio Andrés de Urdaneta, Lauroeta Etorbidea 6 48180 Loiu, Bizkaia, Spain
- Casa Provincial Andrés de Urdaneta, Manuel Uribe 1 28033 Madrid, Spain
- Capellania MM. Agustinas, Santa Teresa, 7 Apdo. 24447407 Medina Del Campo, Valladolid, Spain
- Parroquia Nra. Sra. de Consolación, Calle Pintor Miró, 3 28933 Mostoles, Madrid, Spain
- Convento Nra. Sra. del Carmen, Paseo del Puerto, 14 48990 Neguri, Vizcaya, Spain
- Comunidad PP. Agustinos, Plaza Concejil, 1 38400 Puerto de la Cruz 38 00 51 Par, Tenerife, Spain
- Comunidad PP. Agustinos, Plaza Santo Domingo, 6 24200 Valencia de Don Juan, Leon, Spain
- Real Colegio de Agustinos Filipinos, Paseo Filipinos, 7 47007 Valladolid, Spain
- Comunidad de formación, Paseo Filipinos, 7 47007 Valladolid 30 06 21 Spain
- Colegio San Agustín, Avenida de las Torres, 79-89 50008 Zaragoza 22 48 43 Spain

== See also ==
- Augustinian Province of Santo Niño de Cebu
- University of San Agustin

== Sources ==
- Blas Sierra de la Calle, OSA, "Friars' Museum Showcases Finest Far Eastern Art Collection in Spain," in Search, The Augustinian Journal of Cultural Excellence (Makati) I (2004), p. 9.
- Policarpo F. Hernández, OSA, "A Church Built for the Ages Fuses Two Alien Cultures," in Search, The Augustinian Journal of Cultural Excellence (Makati) I (2004), pp. 45–55.
- This article incorporates texts from Augnet: A reference Web site on St. Augustine and the Order of Saint Augustine.
