= Santo Niño de Tondo =

Title of the Child Jesus in the Catholic Church

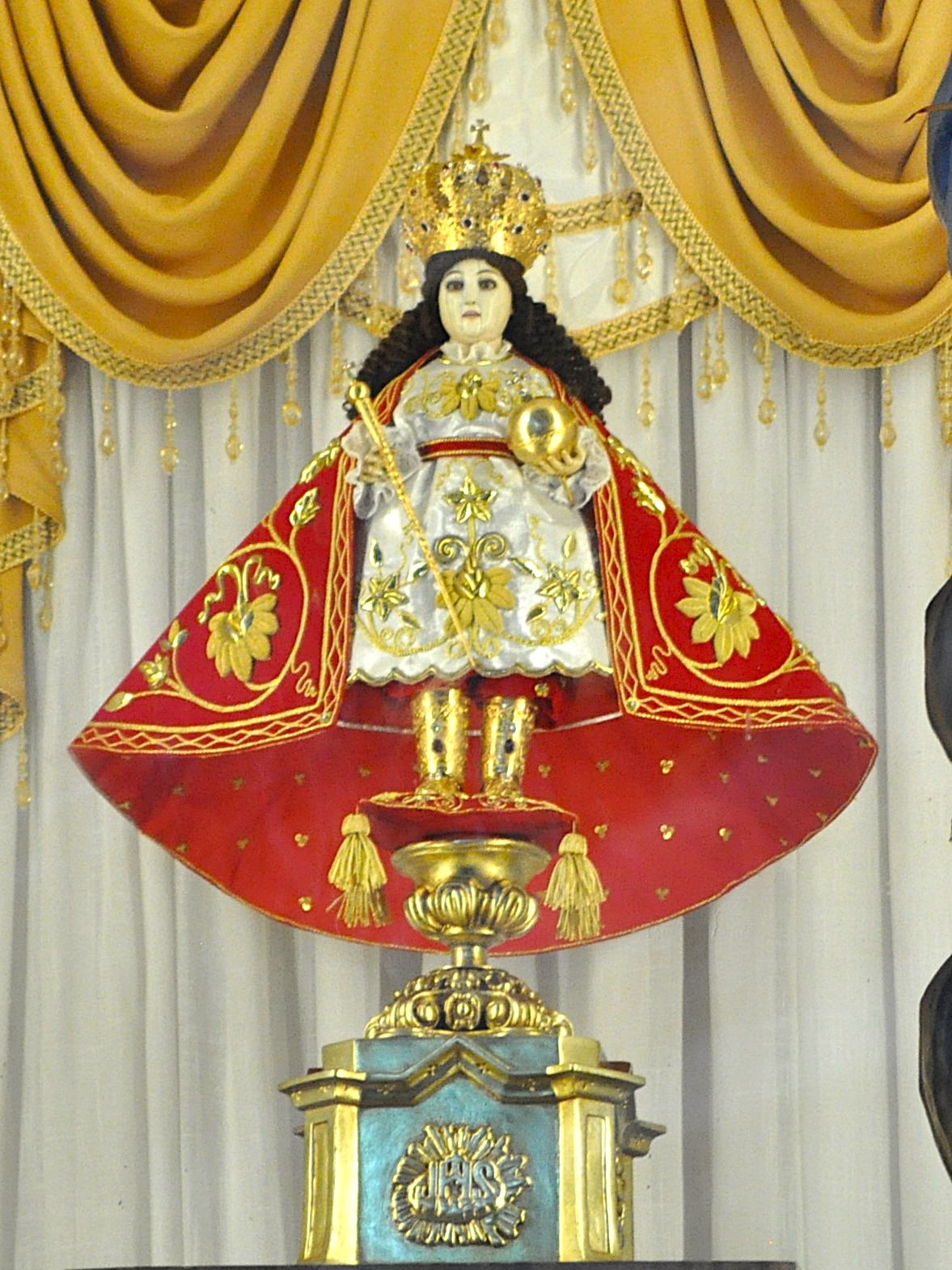
- The original image in 2025
- Location: Tondo, Manila, Philippines
- Date: 1572
- Witness: Miguel López de Legazpi
- Type: Statue made with ivory head, hands, and feet with a wooden body
- Approval: Roman Catholic Archdiocese of Manila (formerly Diocese of Manila)
- Venerated in: Catholic Church
- Shrine: Archdiocesan Shrine of Santo Niño de Tondo
- Patronage: Tondo, Manila
- Attributes: crown, sceptre, globus cruciger, light skin, maroon mantle, gold boots
- Feast day: Third Sunday in January

The Santo Niño de Tondo is a Catholic title of the Child Jesus associated with a religious image of the Christ Child. The image was brought to the Philippines during the expedition of Miguel López de Legazpi in 1572, and is the second-oldest image of the Child Jesus in the Philippines after the Santo Niño de Cebú. The image is enshrined in the Archdiocesan Shrine of Santo Niño de Tondo.

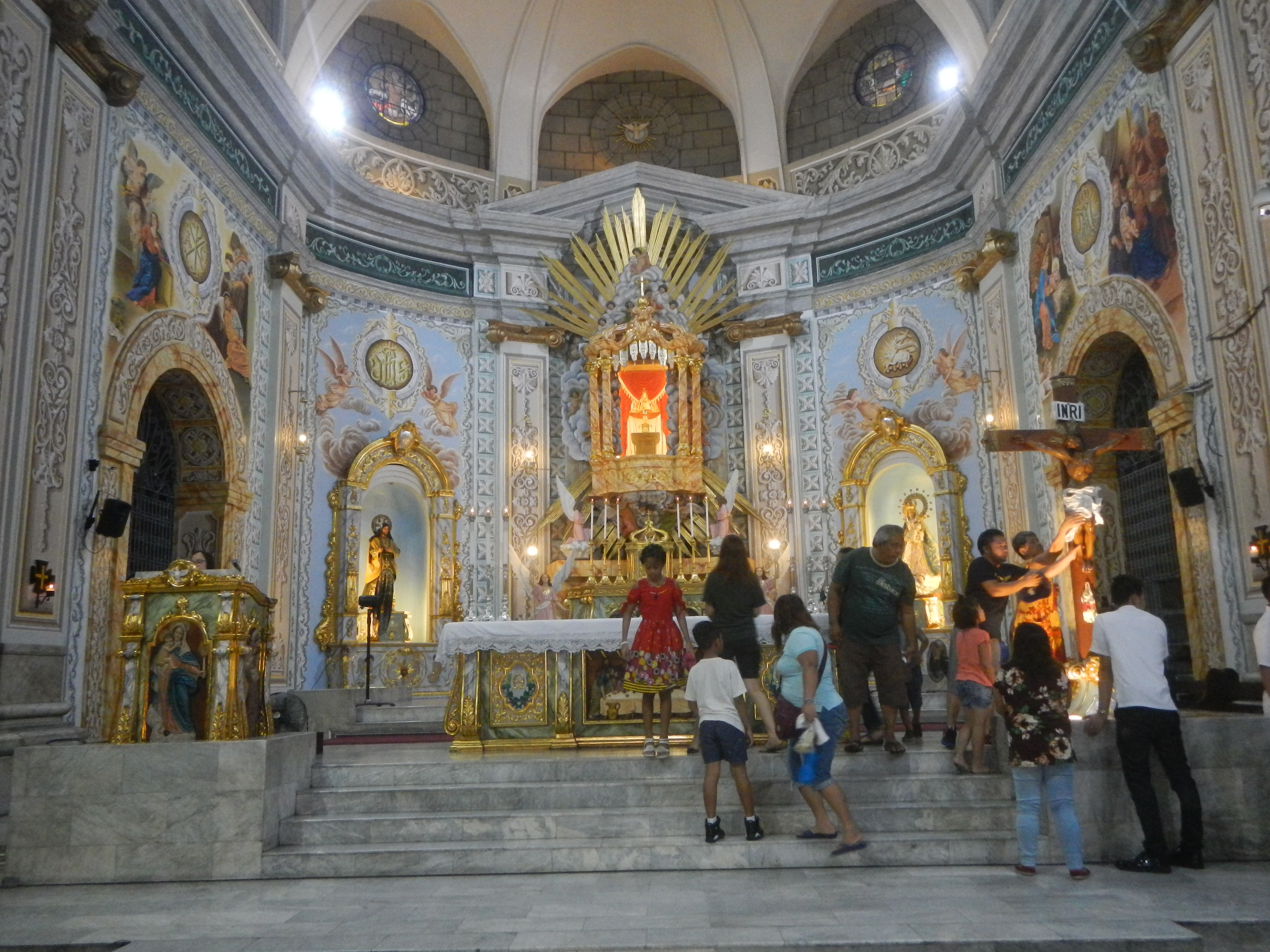
The high altar of Tondo Church, with the original image of the Santo Niño de Tondo displayed in the center.

== History ==
=== Origin ===
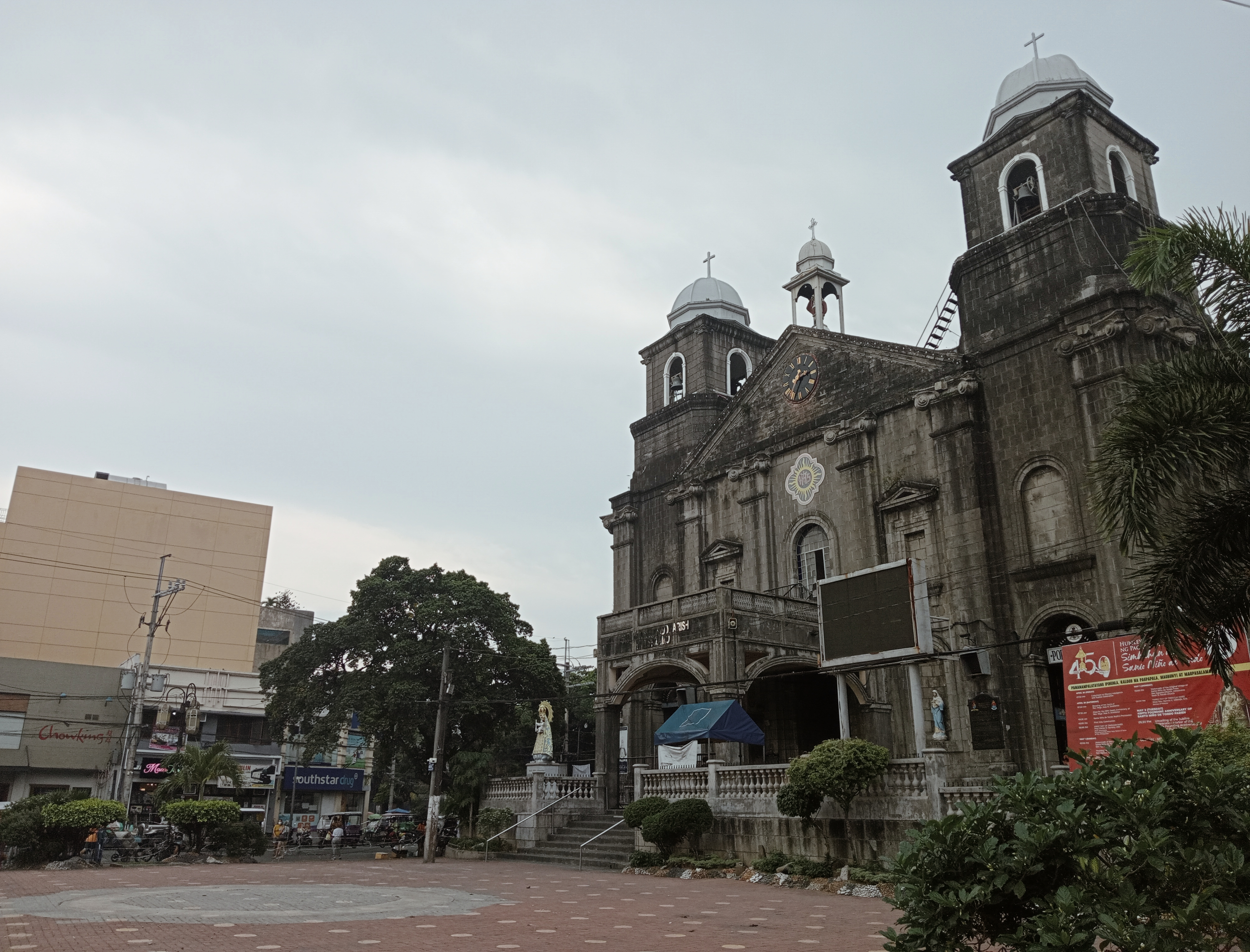
Archdiocesan Shrine of Santo Niño de Tondo

This statue of the Child Jesus was originally brought to Manila from Acapulco in the early 1570s. This was likely during the expedition of Miguel López de Legazpi. The shrine of the Holy Child was recognized as a Provincial Chapter by the Spanish Augustinian friars of Luzon on May 3, 1572, with Alonzo Alvarado, OSA becoming its official parish priest and director.

=== Theft and recovery ===
The image of Santo Niño de Tondo was taken from its shrine above the high altar on July 14, 1972. Fr. Lorenzo Egos, the then-assistant parish priest, claimed the robbers had fled the church after the doors were locked at 8 p.m. that day.

Coincidentally, after the image was stolen, the country was struck by one of the worst weather-related disasters in Philippine history, Typhoon Gloring. A majority of the Filipino faithful believed the disaster was caused by the theft of the image.

Sometime after the theft, authorities arrested the four men who stole the image, which was found dismembered. The main torso was discarded in a nearby drainage canal, while the head, hands, and feet were found in the possession of other robbers. All parts of the image were nonetheless recovered.

Then-President Ferdinand Marcos ordered the urgent reconstruction of the desecrated image, which was entrusted to renowned sculptor and santero Máximo Vicente.

=== Today ===
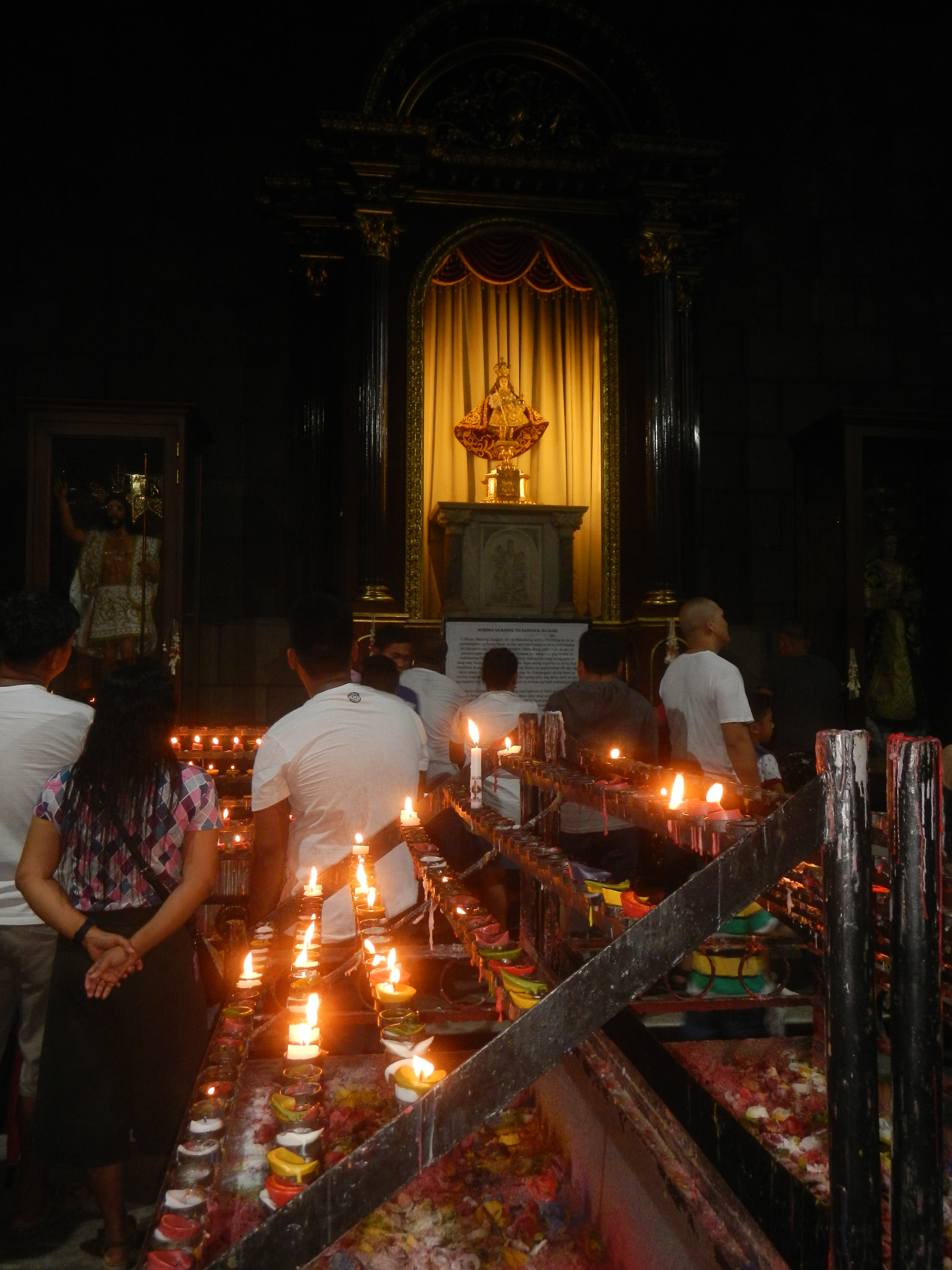
Churchgoers lighting candles in the Church of Tondo.

The Santo Niño de Tondo is the second-oldest venerated image of the Child Jesus in the country, next to the Santo Niño de Cebu. On February 5, 2019, the church was elevated to the rank of Archdiocesan Shrine, with the Archdiocese of Manila recognising its spiritual, historical, and cultural importance, and the devotion to the Santo Niño de Tondo within and outside the archdiocese.

Filipinos consider the image miraculous, with replicas found in Filipino homes, households, and business establishments. Devotees often accord the image the title Harì ng Tondo (“King of Tondo”).

Pope Leo XIV granted a Pontifical decree which raised the shrine of the Santo Niño to the status of Minor Basilica on 9 November 2025. The shrine was publicly inaugurated on 11 May 2026.

== Feast ==
The feast day of Santo Niño in Tondo is celebrated every the third Sunday of January. The fiesta in Tondo has the biggest participation in Manila, not only because Tondo is the most populous district in the city and poorest, but likely due to many anecdotes of miracles connected to the Santo Niño of Tondo.

According to the Philippine Historical Commission, the people of Tondo celebrated the feast day with a fluvial procession that “attracted thousands of visitors.” Tondo’s terrain once consisted of waterways and tributaries connected to Manila Bay, a probable reason why the present stone church of Tondo was built several meters above sea level to prevent waters from inundating the church.

Nick Joaquín writes, “historically, the devotion to Santo Niño (in general) outranks all others because the first church in the Philippines was built to enshrine an image of the Santo Niño.” In his 1979 book Almanac for Manileños, Joaquín detailed previous celebrations of the fiesta:

"At four in the afternoon on the visperas (meaning the Saturday before) the Sto. Niño of Tondo is borne to the sea by a dancing crowd among which groups of women in pastora hats, or in katipuneda attire: white camisa, red saya. The dancing is through sunny streets hung with bunting and here and there will be a giant heart of bell that opens up as the Sto. Niño passes to unloose a shower of petals. Everyone dances, even the barefoot men bearing the image and the boys bearing standard or farol. At North Harbor waits the great pagoda with turreted altar. The Sto. Niño embarks, along with everybody who can squeeze abroad and the pagoda moves through the flaming hues of the sunset escorted by fishing fleets bedecked with banners the smaller boats racing each other round and round the pagoda. Dusk falls as the flotilla sails northward along the bay. On the pagoda the dancing continues but the trip has also become a picnic as the good old custom of caridad showers forth bags of biscuits and baskets of native oranges. The Sto. Niño moves in a blaze of light on the waters of his city. The voyage ends at the landing in the Velasquez and Pritil, densest tenement of Tondo is even livelier because folks back from school or works join in the merriment and besides, it's always more fun to dance under the stars than under the sun. Parents not only from Tondo or Manila but also from the province come to dance before the Sto. Niño to pray for a sick child or give thanks for a child's recovery."

The fiesta of the Santo Niño de Tondo has since been called the “Lakbayaw Festival”, a portmanteau of the Tagalog words lakbáy (“journey”) and sayáw (“dance”). It was coined with the meaning of “a joyful journey with the Lord.”

== See also ==
- Santo Niño de Cebú
- Santo Niño de Arévalo
