= Tondo Church =

Roman Catholic church in Manila, Philippines

Minor Basilica of Santo Niño in Tondo
- Minor Basilica and Archdiocesan Shrine Parish of Santo Niño de Tondo
- Basilika Menor at Arkidiyosesanong Dambana Parokya ng Santo Niño de Tondo (Filipino); Basílica Menor y Santuario Arquidiócesano del Santo Niño de Tondo (Spanish)
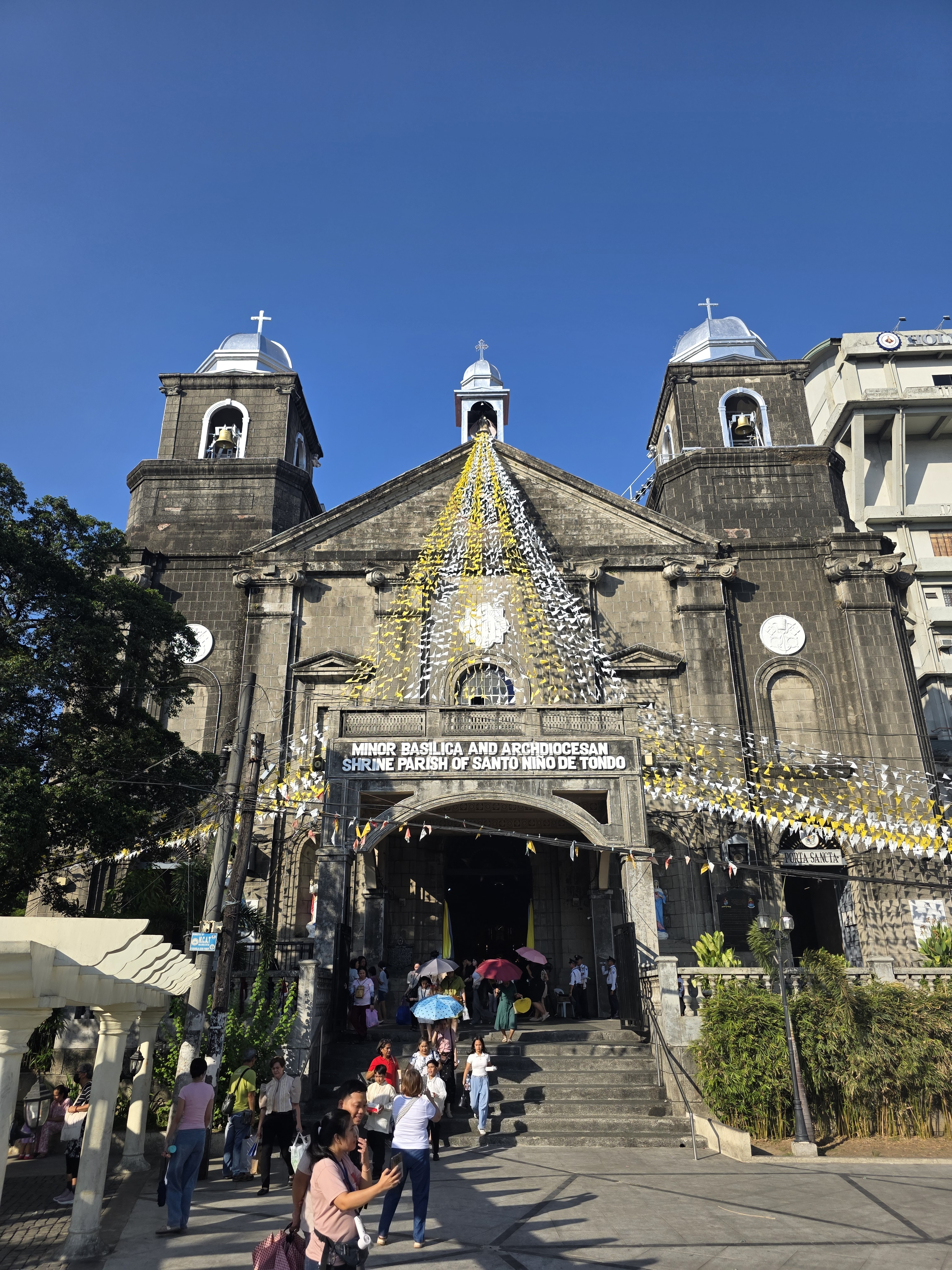
- Church facade in May 2026
- Minor Basilica of Santo Niño in Tondo
- 14°36′28″N 120°58′03″E
- Location: Tondo, Manila
- Country: Philippines
- Denomination: Roman Catholic

History
- Former name: Santo Niño de Tondo Parish
- Status: Minor basilica; Archdiocesan shrine
- Founded: May 3, 1572; 454 years ago
- Founder(s): Padre Alonzo Alvarado, OSA
- Dedication: Santo Niño de Tondo

Architecture
- Functional status: Active
- Architect: Luciano Oliver
- Architectural type: Church Building
- Style: Neo-Classical
- Completed: 1695

Specifications
- Materials: Masonry

Administration
- Archdiocese: Manila
- Deanery: Santo Niño
- Parish: Santo Niño

Clergy
- Rector: Geronimo F. Reyes (and vicar forane)

The Minor Basilica of Santo Niño de Tondo, also known as the Archdiocesan Shrine of Santo Niño de Tondo Parish is a Roman Catholic minor basilica in Tondo, Manila, Philippines. The shrine was originally established by the Augustinian Order, under the jurisdiction of the Archdiocese of Manila. The Basilica is dedicated to the Child Jesus.

The shrine houses an ivory image of the Christ Child which originally came from Acapulco, Mexico and was handed over by a wealthy merchant to the Archbishop of Manila at that time, who later turned it over to the parish priest of Tondo, Manila. Since 1572, the image of the Santo Niño has been enshrined in this church. It is the second oldest image of the Child Jesus in the Philippines after the Santo Niño de Cebú in Cebu City.

Pope Leo XIV granted a Pontifical decree which raised the shrine to the status of minor basilica on 9 November 2025. The shrine was publicly inaugurated on 11 May 2026.

== History ==
The church, one of the earliest churches established by the Spanish friars in Luzon, was founded by the Augustinians who were the first Catholic religious order to arrive in the Philippines. The Augustinian Convent in Tondo was approved by the provincial chapter on May 3, 1572. Its visitas were Lubao, Betis, and Calumpit. Fray Alonzo Alvarado, OSA was the first Augustinian religious to direct the church. In 1572, Tondo Church added visitas in northern suburbs, including Malolos. Through Fray Diego Ordoñez de Vivar, Tondo extended its ecclesiastical territory to Morong.

Construction of the first stone monastery is believed to have started in 1611 under Fray Alonso Guerrero, then minister of Tondo. The convent of Tondo was relieved of its ten percent contribution (tithe) to Manila in 1620 due to the needed costly repairs of the convent and the church. This resolution was repeated the following year due to needed assistance to be provided for the father provincial who was then staying in Tondo.

During 1625, Fray Antonio de Ocampo pawned the convent for 800 pesos, the sum to be spent during a three-year term improvement of the house facilities like the cenador, staircase, etc. It is believed that the construction of the church and convent was finalized at around this time.

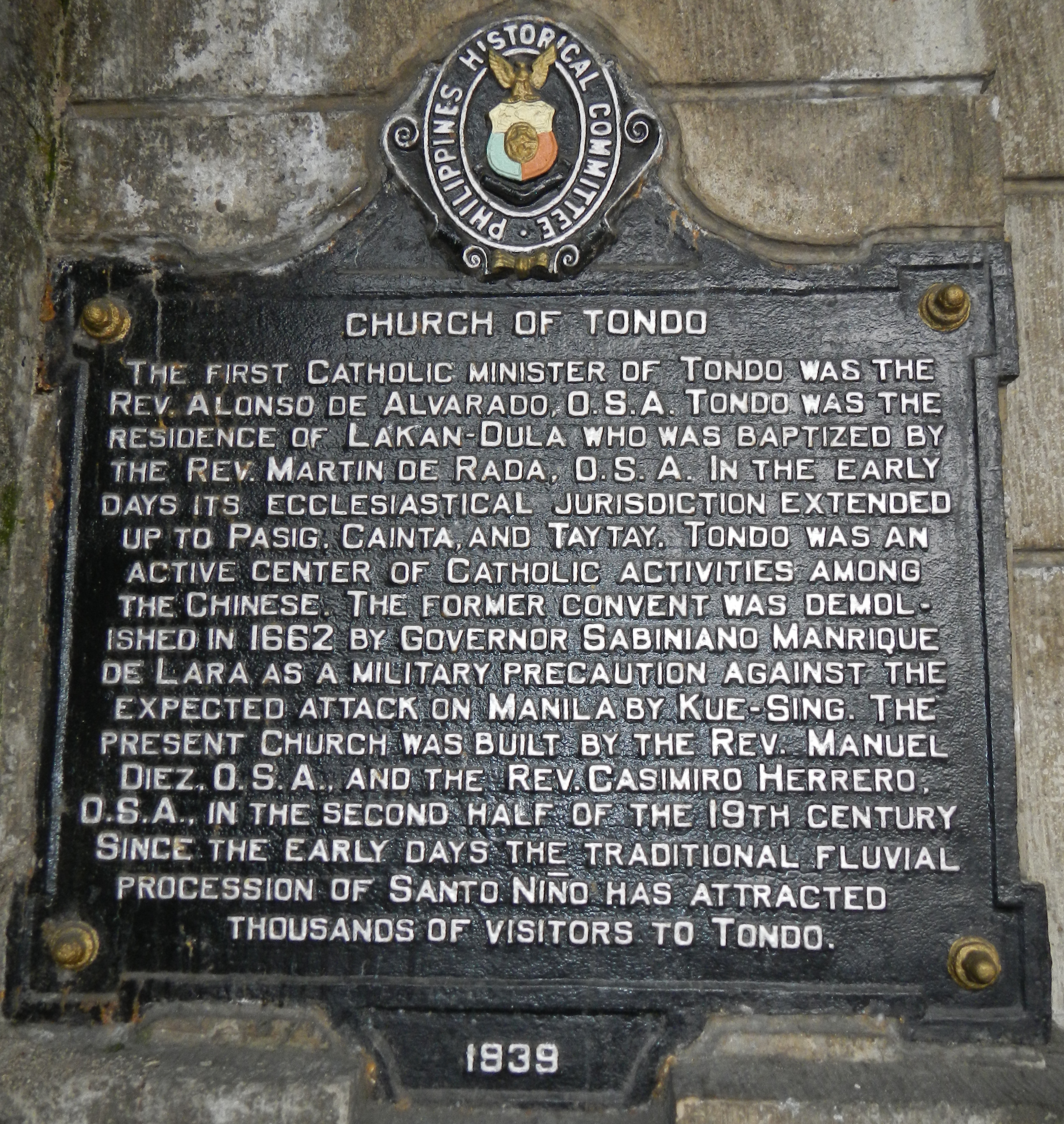
Church historical marker (1939).

In 1641, the prior was authorized to repair the church due to the turmoil caused by the Sangleys and in addition, water cisterns were installed to save budget for purchasing. Four years after, the church was in need of immediate repair because it was devastated again by the 1645 Luzon earthquake. The repairs and restoration were done and the "church looked magnificent and strong in its full masonry construction".

This magnificence was short-lived because, in 1661, Governor Sabiniano Manrique de Lara who feared Koseng (Koxinga), a Chinese pirate from Hermosa Island (Formosa, now Taiwan) might fortify himself inside the structure. He ordered that the structure be pulled down. According to a clause of the Chapter of 1661, "the convent suffered so much during the war of the Sangleys that now it cannot be sufficient by itself". The income of Sangley stores, the alms for the souls in Purgatory, some donations and tax exemption were utilized for the rebuilding of the church and the convent.

In 1714, the Private Definitory proposed that the church and convent of Tondo pay back from their own properties the funds that were spent for the reconstructions of the church. In 1728, the convent used 2,000 pesos from the provincial funds to renovate and enlarge the church. The facade and the two towers that were about to fall were reconstructed in 1734. This rebuilding was done during the term of Diego Bergaño. The building was damaged again by the earthquake of 1740 and was repaired the next year.

The church was heavily damaged again by another earthquake in 1863 and was rebuilt for the third time by Manuel Diez Gonzalez, OSA. The restoration was completed by Casimiro Herrero, parish priest of Tondo from 1874 to 1880, who followed the plans of architect Luciano Oliver in 1873. For the first time in the country, steel framing was used for the media naranja dome and iron sheets for the roofing. Condrado Gregorio took over the construction from Oliver and used aramadura de hierro, which came from England. Mariano Gil led the construction of the cemetery during his priorship from 1889 to 1898. The fence was designed by architect Gregorio N. Santos. Walls made of stone were imported from Guadalupe and Meycauayan. The entire construction project costed 2,150 pesos.

The organ was imported from the renowned Amezua Organeros of Barcelona, Spain and was installed in 1893. It had one main keyboard with 56 keys and a pédalier with 19 keys and four combinations. In 1898, Pablo Alvarez bought a molave door for 1470 pesos to be used as the main entrance door.

Church services came to a halt when it was used as a cuartel during the Japanese occupation of the Philippines. The services were held in the house of Primo Arambulo at Santiago de Vera Street. During the last days of the Japanese occupation, the church was reopened for thousands of refugees. However, all of its records were lost in the process.

In 1997, aside from major repairs, Carillon bells were installed under the term of Msgr. Emmanuel Sunga as Parish Priest.

On January 12, 2019, Cardinal Luis Antonio Tagle elevated the parish into an archdiocesan shrine; the solemn declaration rites took place on February 5, 2019.

Pope Leo XIV elevated the church to the status of minor basilica on November 9, 2025. On May 11, 2026, it was solemnly declared a basilica by Apostolic Nuncio to the Philippines Charles John Brown and Cardinal Jose Advincula.

== Architectural style ==
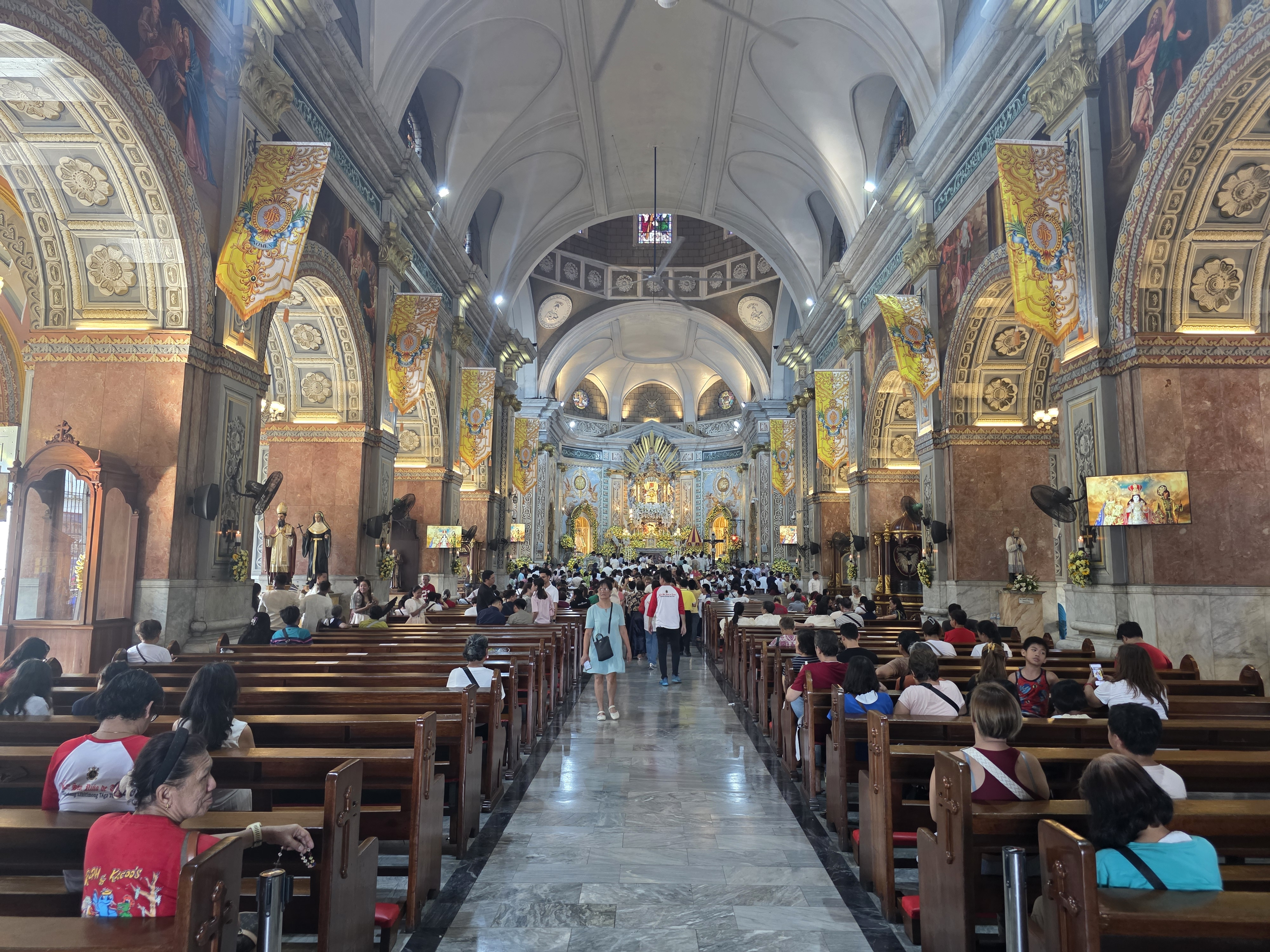
Church interior

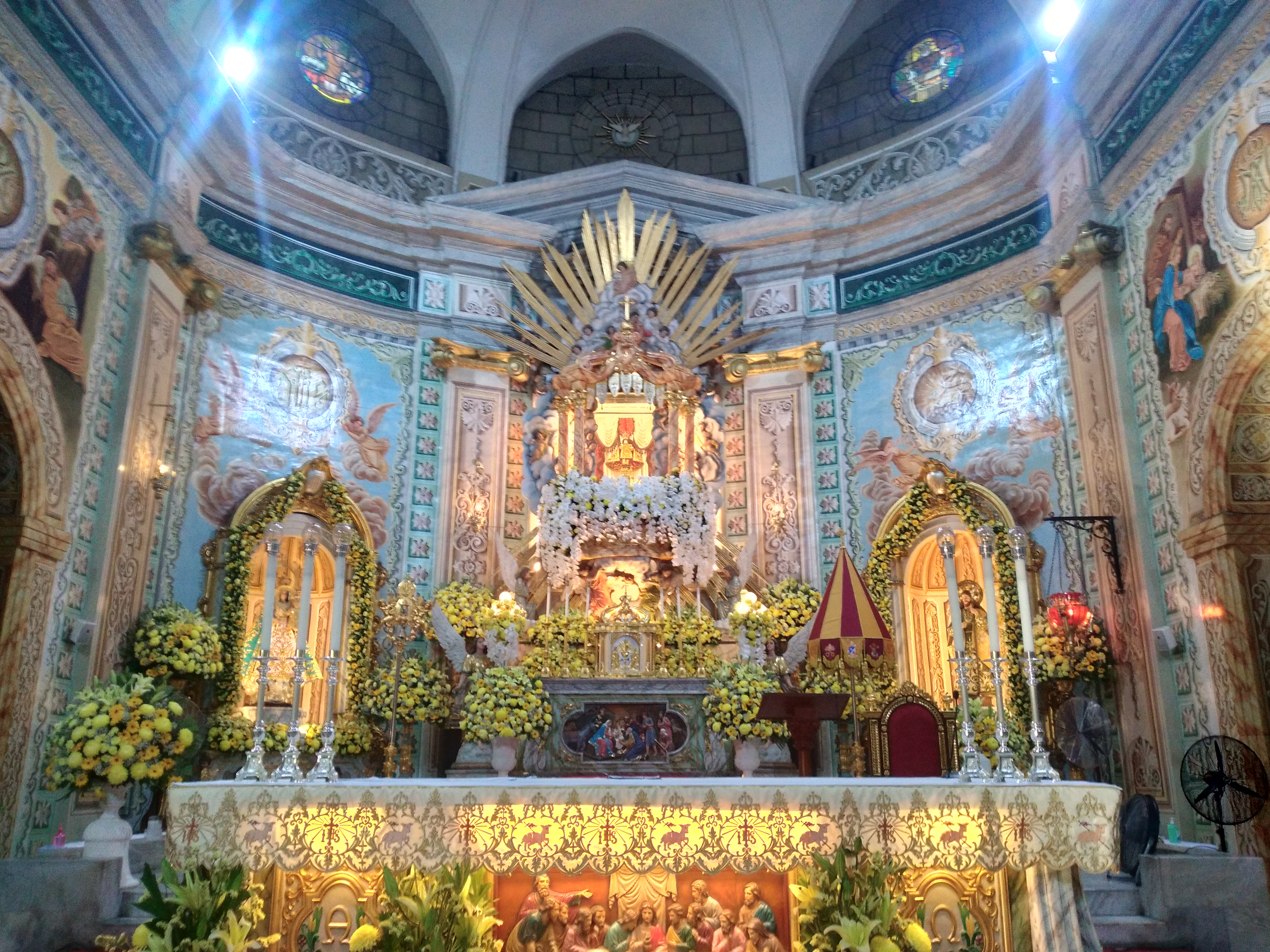
Altar and retablo with umbraculum

The structural envelope is characterized by minimal ornamentation with Ionic rectangular pilasters attached at the main facade. Massive buttresses also support the unproportional domes of the bell towers. There are also blind arched openings that contrast with the rectangular voids and a triangular pediment. The neoclassical architectural style has its big influence the construction of the church and convent. In its interiors, it is composed of a main central nave that is flanked by two aisles that are linked by solid columns. The internal space spans 65 metres (213 ft) in length, 22 metres (72 ft) in width and 17 metres (56 ft) in height.

== Feast of the Santo Niño de Tondo ==
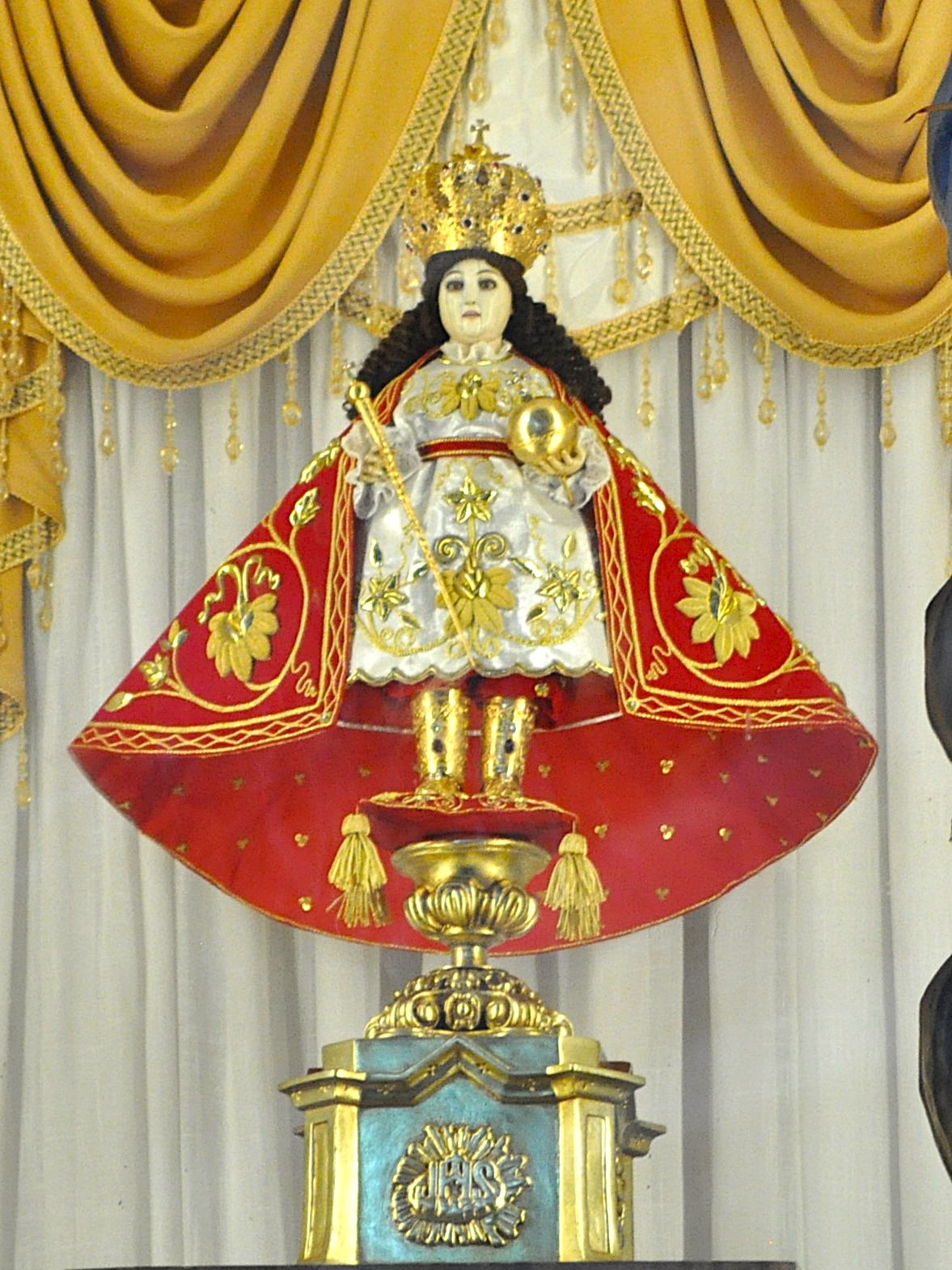
The image of Santo Niño de Tondo in 2025.

The feast day of Santo Niño in Tondo is celebrated in the third Sunday of January. The fiesta in Tondo has the biggest participation in Manila, not only because Tondo is the most populous district in the city and poorest but perhaps because of the many anecdotes connected with the Santo Niño of Tondo.

According to the Philippine Historical Commission (now the National Historical Commission of the Philippines), the people of Tondo celebrated the feast day with a fluvial procession that "attracted thousands of visitors". Tondo's terrain at that time consisted of waterways and tributaries which were connected to Manila Bay, a probable reason why the present stone church of Tondo was constructed on elevated ground (several meters above sea level) to prevent sea waters from inundating the Church.

Nick Joaquín writes, "historically, the devotion to Santo Niño (in general) outranks all others because the first church in the Philippines was built to enshrine an image of the Santo Niño". In his book Almanac for Manileños (1979), Joaquín describes previous celebrations of the fiesta:

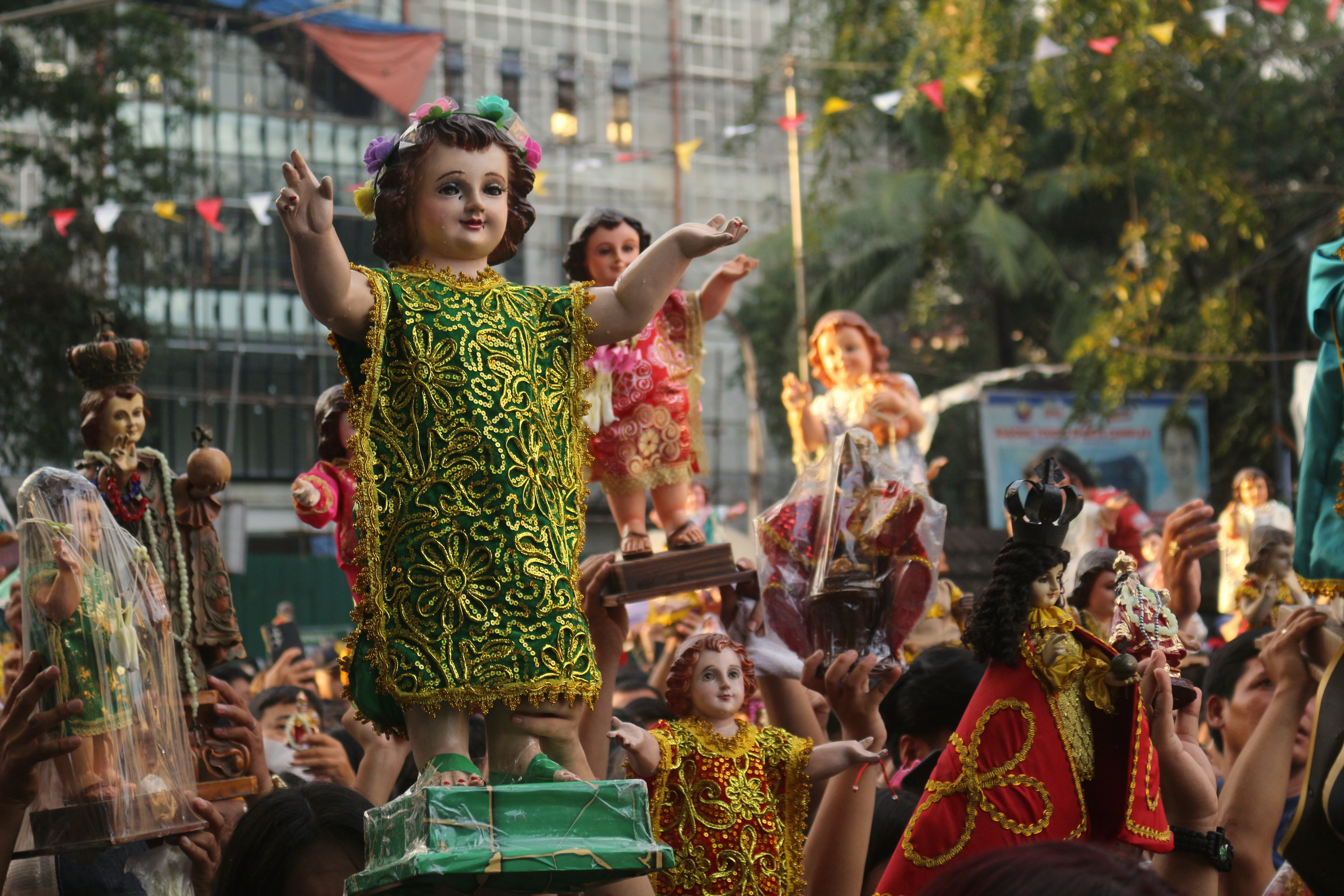
Outside the parish, devotees raise various images of the Christ Child to be blessed with holy water after a 2026 feast day Mass.

"At four in the afternoon on the visperas (meaning the Saturday before) the Sto. Niño of Tondo is borne to the sea by a dancing crowd among which groups of women in pastora hats, or in katipuneda attire: white camisa, red saya. The dancing is through sunny streets hung with bunting and here and there will be a giant heart of bell that opens up as the Sto. Niño passes to unloose a shower of petals. Everyone dances, even the barefoot men bearing the image and the boys bearing standard or farol. At North Harbor waits the great pagoda with turreted altar. The Sto. Niño embarks, along with everybody who can squeeze abroad and the pagoda moves through the flaming hues of the sunset escorted by fishing fleets bedecked with banners the smaller boats racing each other round and round the pagoda. Dusk falls as the flotilla sails northward along the bay. On the pagoda the dancing continues but the trip has also become a picnic as the good old custom of caridad showers forth bags of biscuits and baskets of native oranges. The Sto. Niño moves in a blaze of light on the waters of his city. The voyage ends at the landing in the Velasquez and Pritil, densest tenement of Tondo is even livelier because folks back from school or works join in the merriment and besides, it's always more fun to dance under the stars than under the sun. Parents not only from Tondo or Manila but also from the province come to dance before the Sto. Niño to pray for a sick child or give thanks for a child's recovery."

The fiesta of the Santo Niño has since been called the "Lakbayaw Festival". The name of the festival is a portmanteau of the Tagalog-Filipino words lakbáy (meaning "to journey") and sayáw (meaning "to dance"), with the intended meaning of "a joyful journey with the Lord". The current name has become popular because of the many contingents of dancers—particularly males—who take part on the parade on the streets of Tondo on the Saturday before the third Sunday of January – a homage of the dancing of the former land segments of what was once the fluvial procession.

== Gallery ==
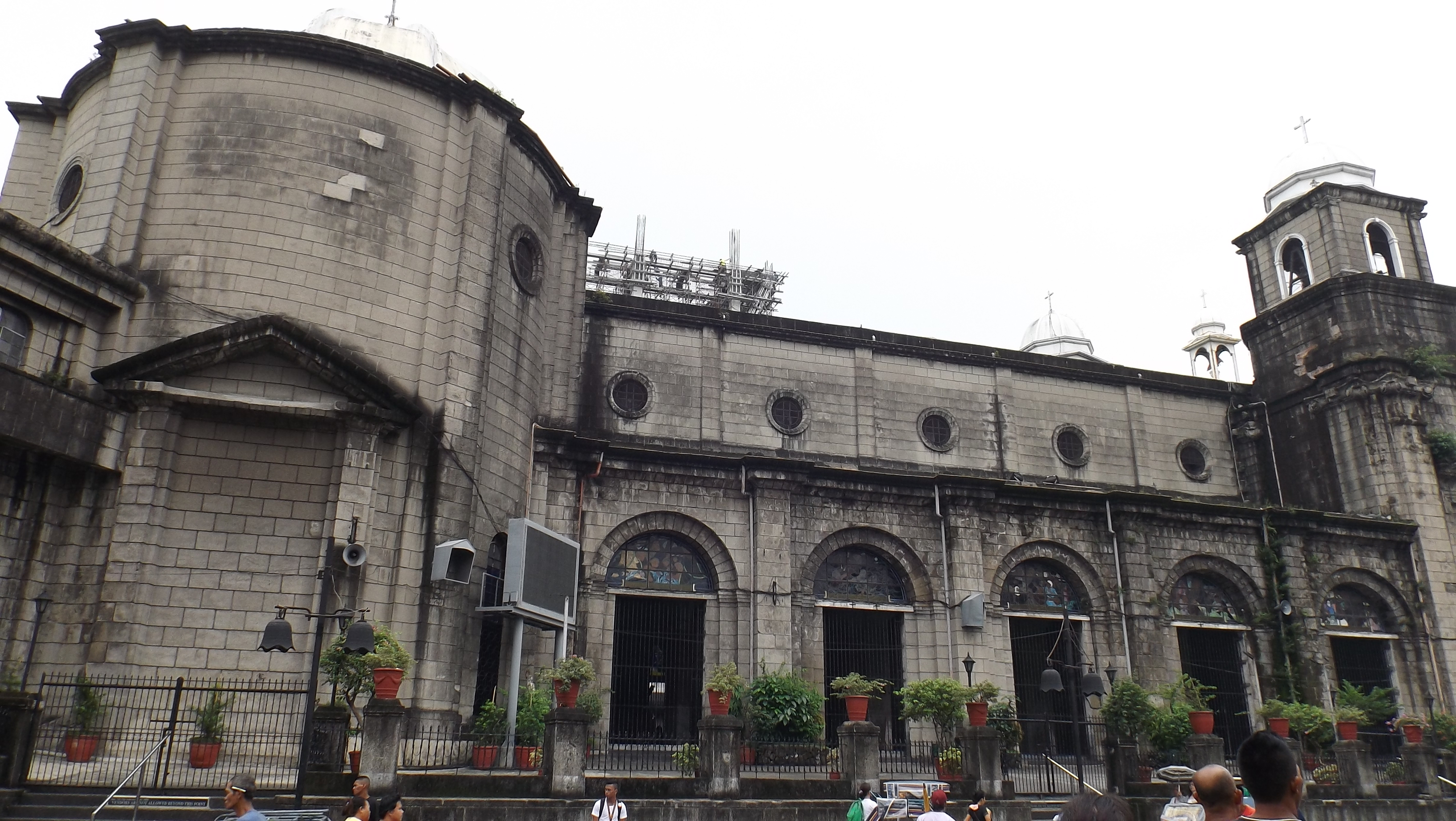
Northern facade

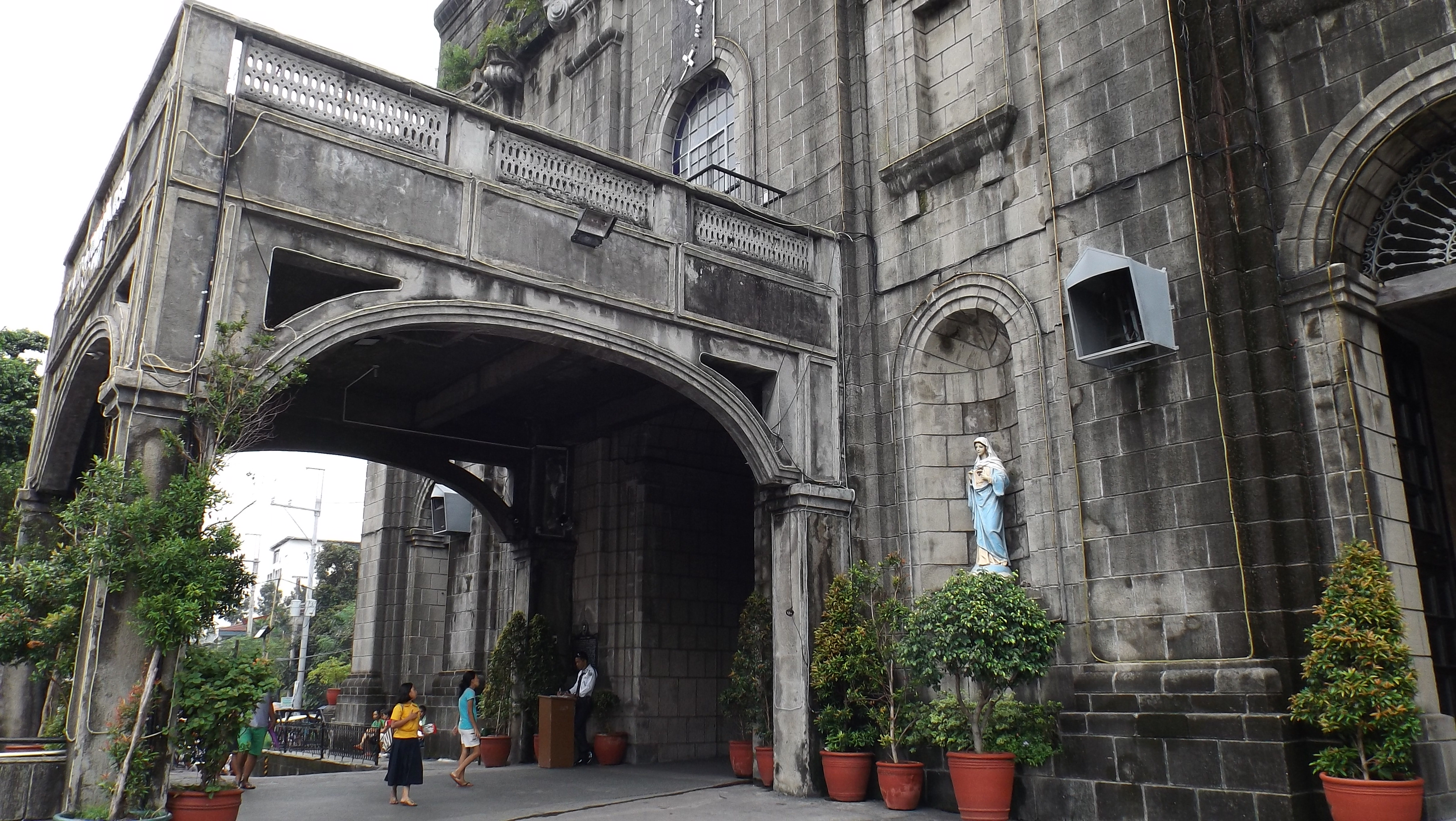
Portico

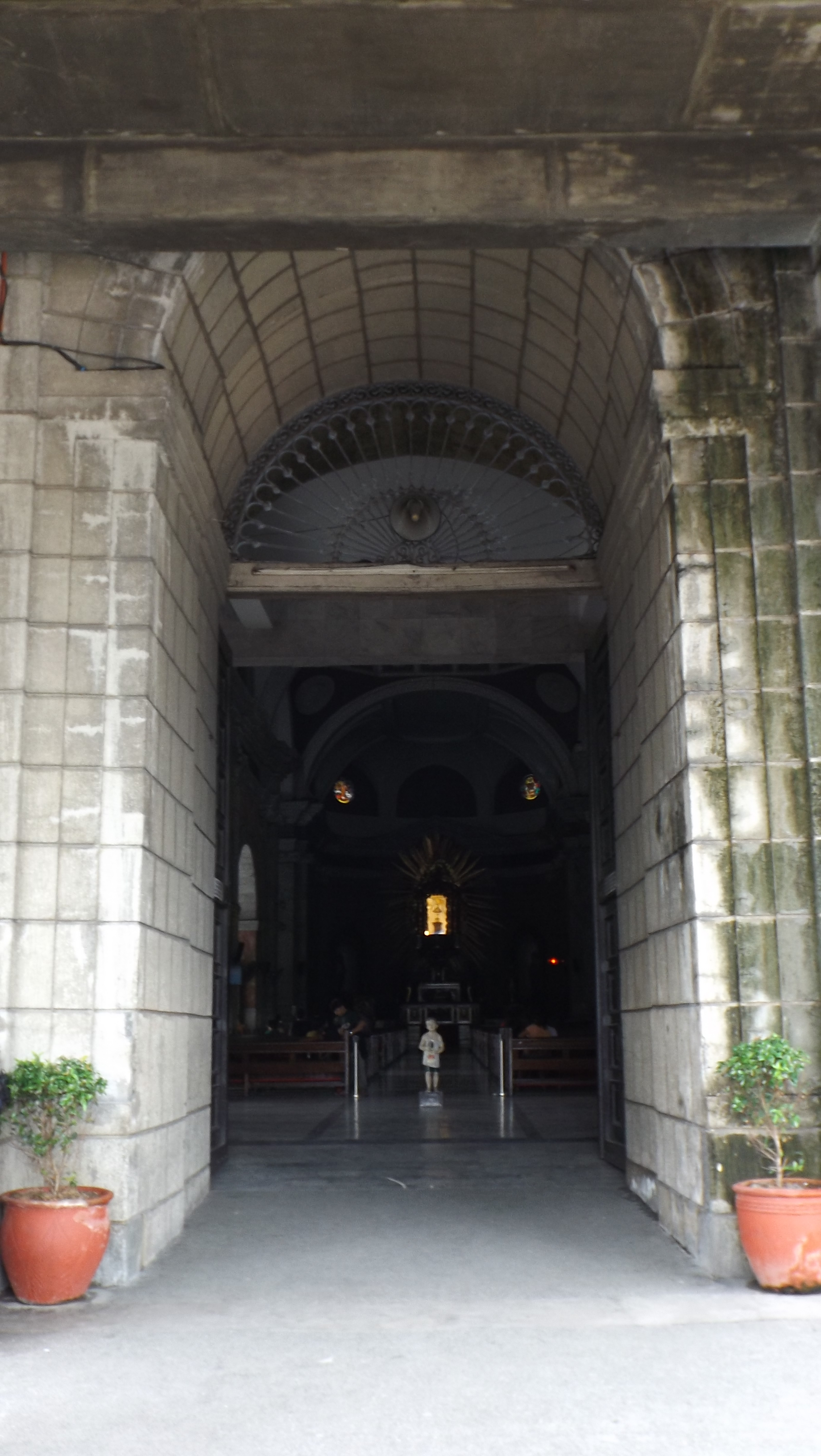
Main portal

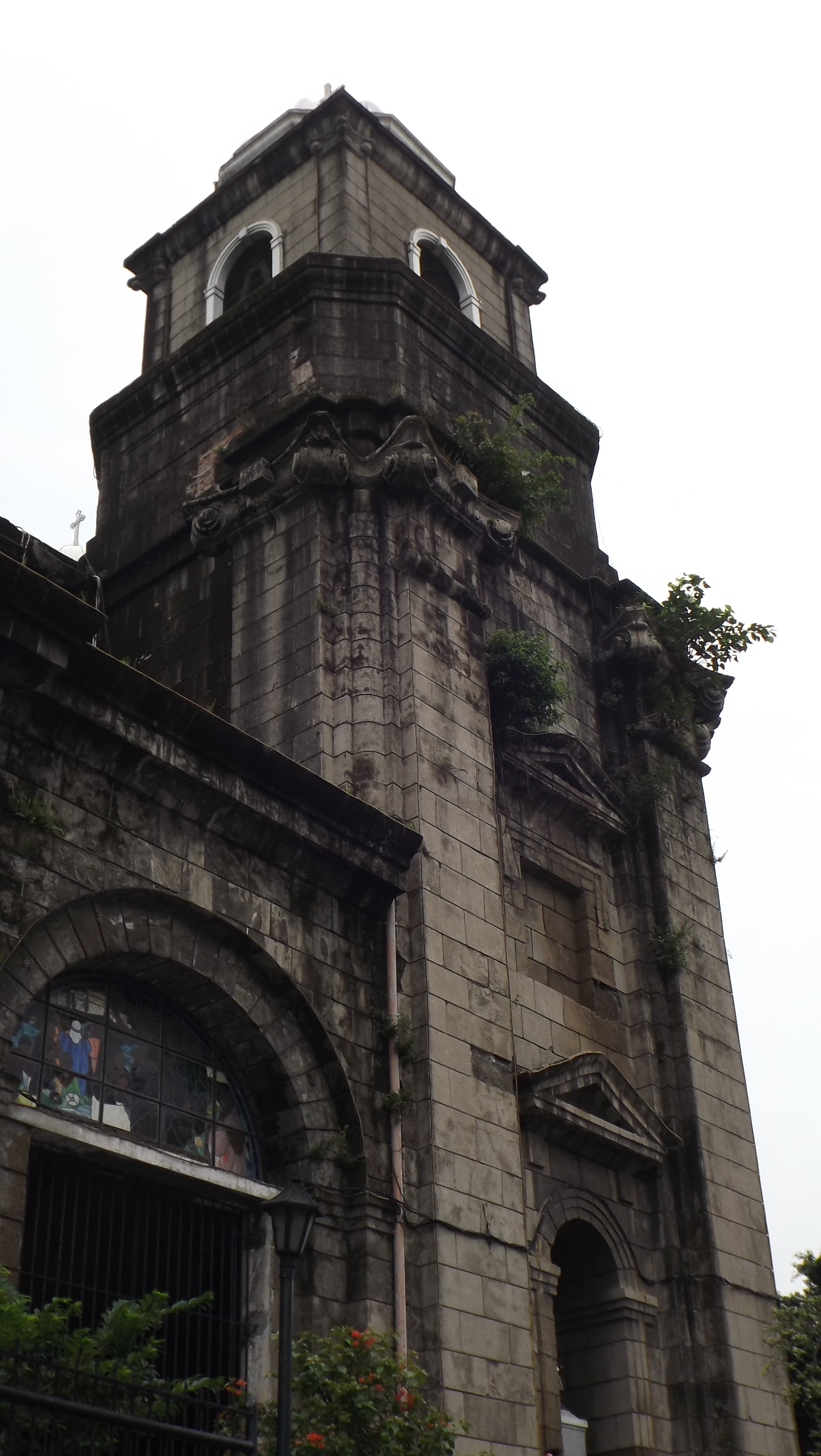
One of the bell towers

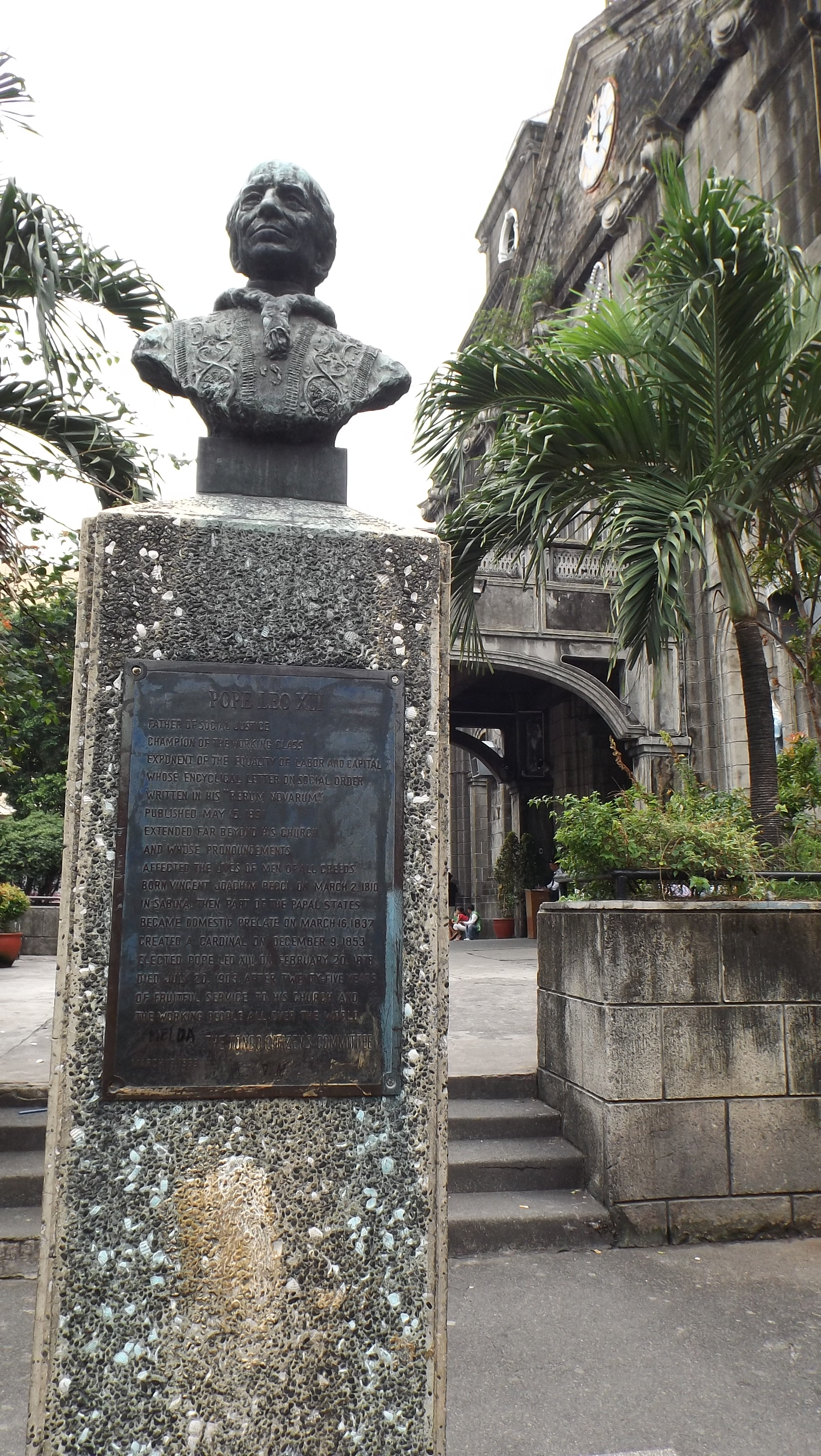
Monument of Pope Leo XIII

== See also ==
- Pandacan Church
- Basilica del Santo Niño
