= Tondo, Manila =

District in Metro Manila, Philippines

Coordinates: 14.617°N 120.967°E

Tondo
- District
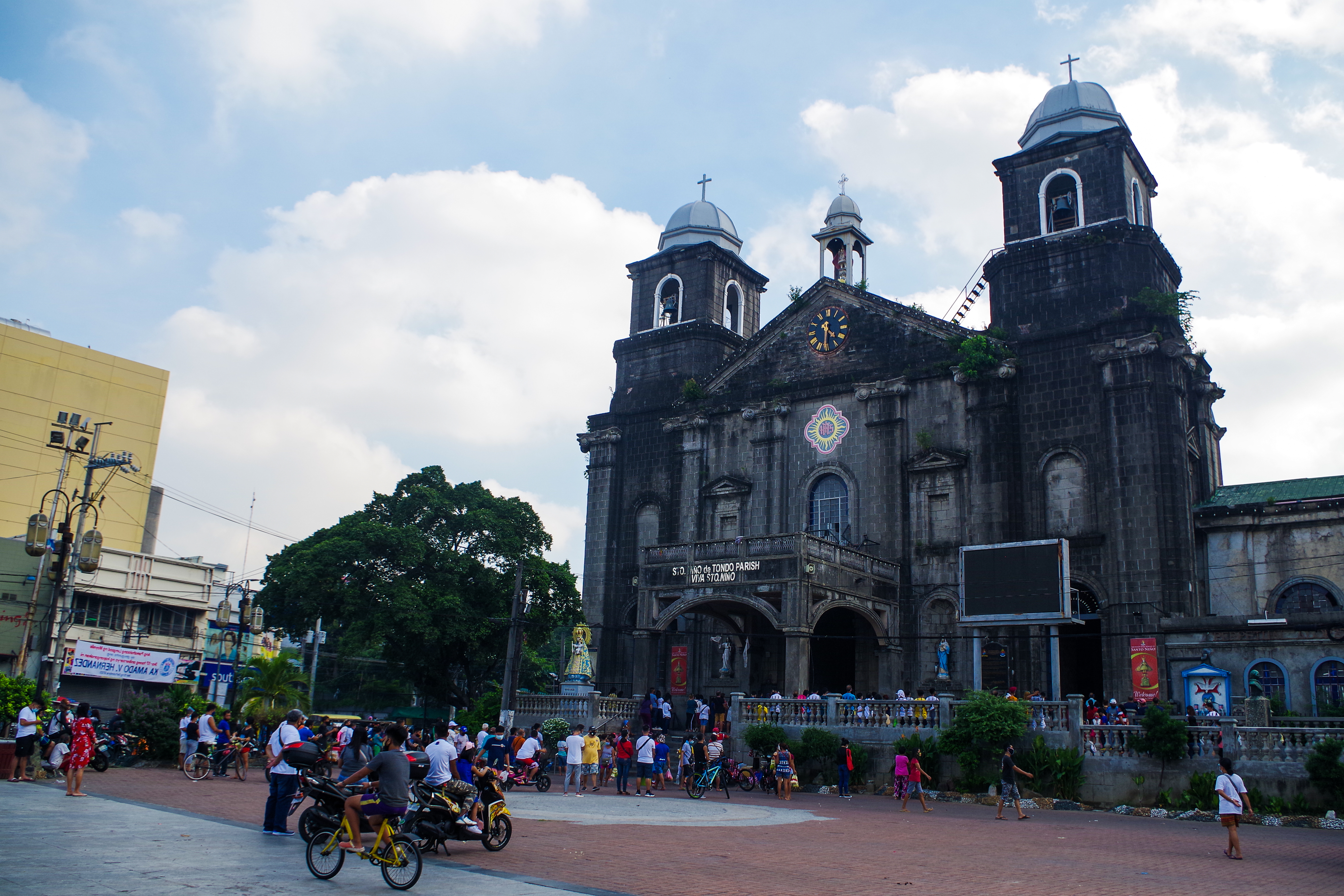
- Tondo Church fronting Plaza Leon

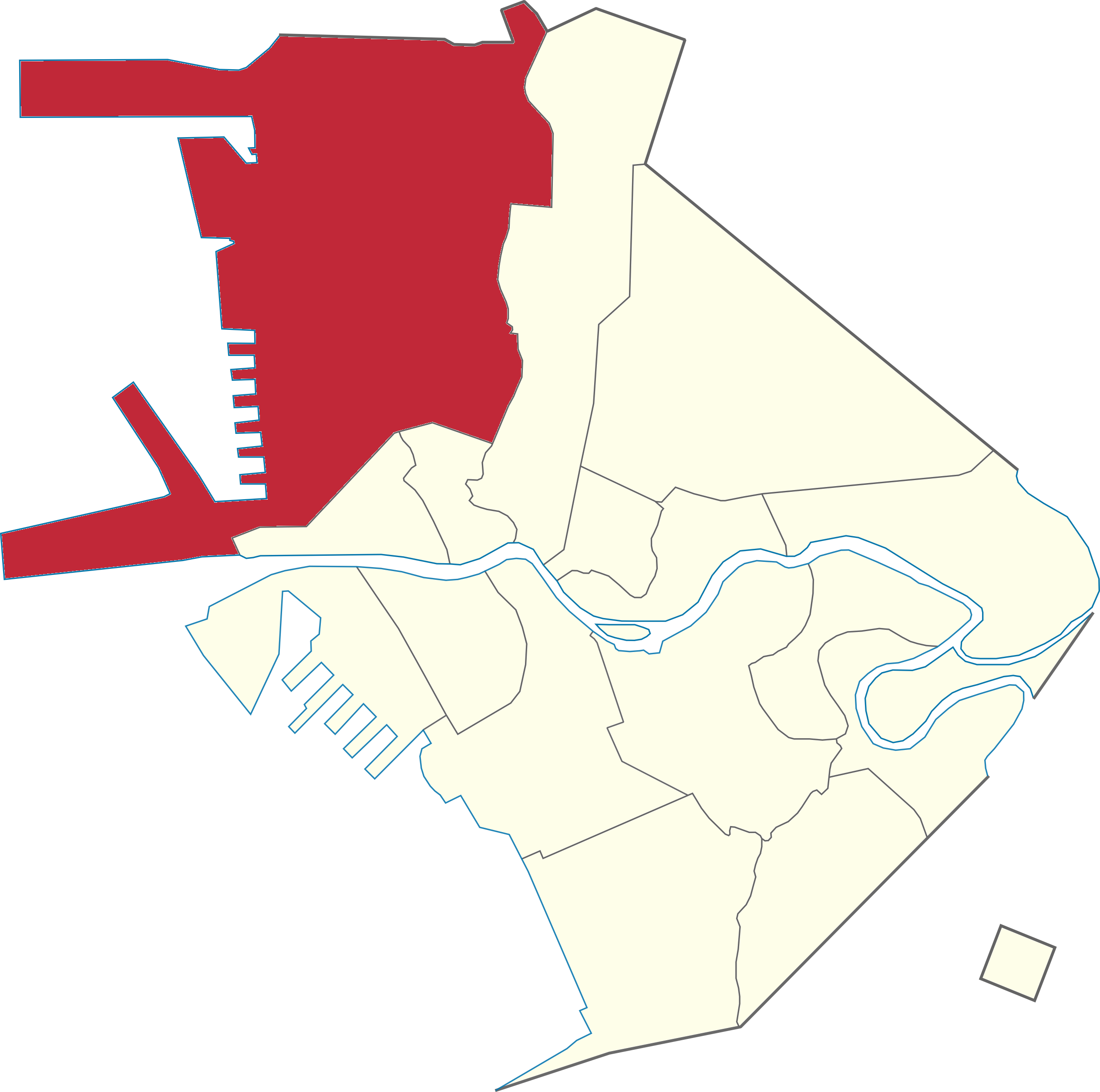
- Country: Philippines
- Region: National Capital Region
- City: Manila
- Congressional district: Manila's 1st (western side) and 2nd districts (eastern side)
- First mentioned: 900

Area
  - Total: 8.65 km^{2} (3.34 sq mi)

Population (2024)
  - Total: 637,942
  - Density: 73,800/km^{2} (191,000/sq mi)
- Time zone: UTC+08:00 (Philippine Standard Time)
- Zip codes: 1012 (Tondo South); 1013 (Tondo North)
- Area codes: 2

Tondo is a district located in Manila, Philippines. It is the largest, in terms of area and population, of Manila's sixteen districts, with a census-estimated 637,942 people in 2024. It consists of two congressional districts. It is also the second most densely populated district in the city.

== Etymology ==
The name Tondo can be derived from its Old Tagalog name, Tundun as inscribed in the Laguna Copperplate Inscription of 900 AD, the earliest native document found within the Philippines. Dutch anthropologist Antoon Postma, the first to translate the copperplate, believes the term tundun originated from Sanskrit, which was used alongside Malay as a language of politics and religion in the area at the time.

Before this landmark discovery, several theories (however incorrect now) existed. Philippine National Artist Nick Joaquin once suggested that it might be a reference to a high ground ("tundok"). On the other hand, French linguist Jean-Paul Potet, supposed that the Aegiceras corniculatum, which at the time was called "tundok" ("tinduk-tindukan" today), was the most likely origin of the name.

According to Kapampangan studies professor Robby Tantingco, the Old Tagalog name was derived from tundun, Kapampangan term of "nape."

== History ==
=== Early Philippine history ===
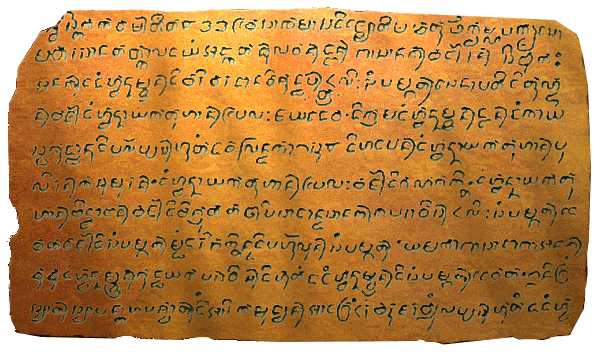
Laguna Copperplate Inscription (900)

The region of Tondo has been settled by humans for over 1,100 years. Historically, Tondo already existed in the year 900 AD according to the Laguna Copperplate Inscription, a legal document that is the earliest document in the Philippines, written in Kawi script now housed in the National Museum of Anthropology.

According to this document, Tondo was ruled by an unnamed person who held the Sanskrit title of senapati or the equivalent of an admiral. Tondo was ruled by a lakan until the Spanish conquest.

=== Colonial period ===
Tondo
- 1589–1901
- Status: Former municipality of Manila (1589-1901)
- History
  - Established: 1589
  - Disestablished: 1901
Preceded by
Tondo
Succeeded by
1599; Tambobong
1815; Caloocan
1901; Manila

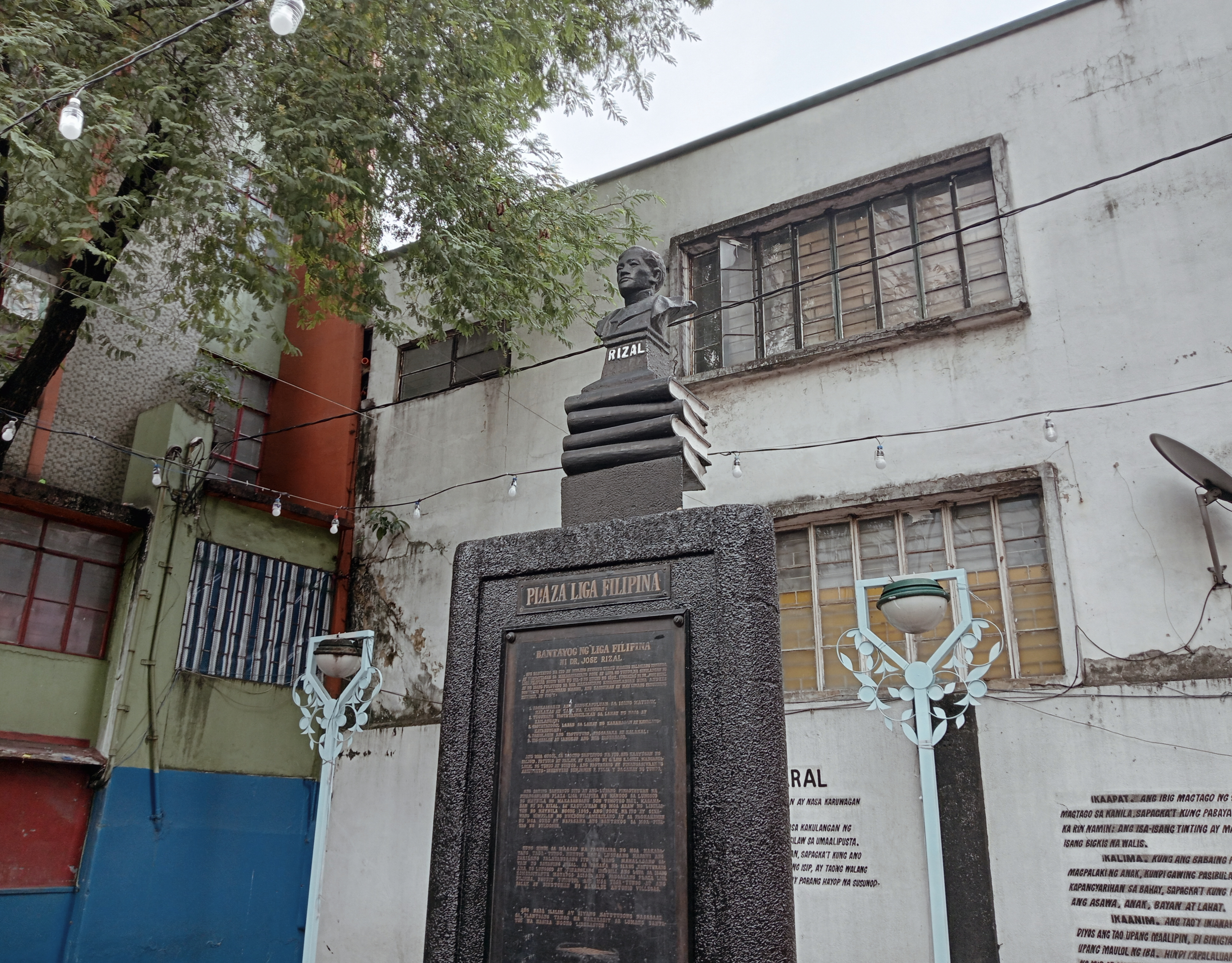
Plaza Liga Filipina

After the Spaniards conquered Tondo in June 1571 they established the Province of Tondo which covered many territories in Northern Luzon particularly Pampanga, Bulacan and Rizal (formerly called Morong), with the city of Manila as its center. In a census conducted by Miguel de Loarca in 1583, Tondo was reported to have spoken the same language as the natives of the province of Pampanga.

Institute of National Language commissioner Jose Villa Panganiban also wrote that the dividing line between Kapampangan and Tagalog was the Pasig River, and that Tondo therefore originally spoke Kapampangan. However, Fray Isacio Rodriquez's Historia dela Provincia del Santisimo Nombre de Jesus de Filipinas stated that Provincia de Tagalos which is Tondo covers all the territories of the future Roman Catholic Archdiocese of Manila. Prior to the establishment of Bulacan in 1578, Malolos and Calumpit were also included in the territory of Tondo as its visitas. By the end of the 1700s, Tondo was a populous province of 14,437 native families and 3,528 Spanish Filipino families. In 1800, the Province of Tondo was renamed to Province of Manila.

Tondo was one of the first provinces to declare rebellion against Spain in the year 1896. In 1901, under the American colonial regime, there was a major reorganization of political divisions, and the province of Tondo was dissolved, with its towns given to the provinces of Rizal and Bulacan. Today, Tondo just exists as a district in the City of Manila.

=== Contemporary Period ===
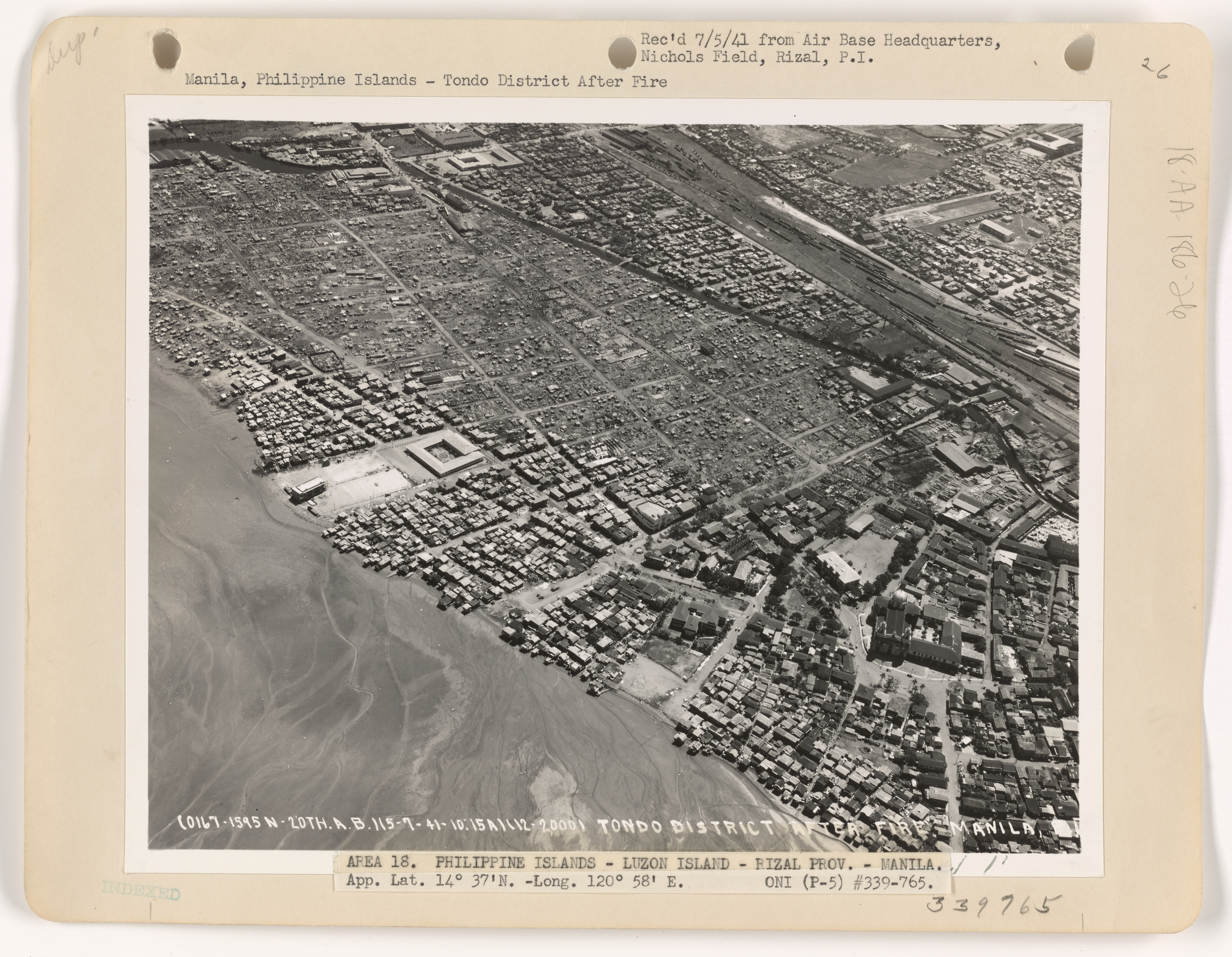
Aerial view of Tondo district after fire, 1941

Slums developed in Tondo along the Pasig River. Authorities sought to improve housing conditions on these areas without condoning the squatting committed by the slums' residents. In the 1970s, the World Bank provided funds to improve conditions in Tondo which led the increase of rent prices and a property boom in the area. This led to gentrification. The slums that were upgraded were legalized but these areas remain vastly different from other parts of Manila with higher population density, more irregular road and plot patterns, and uncontrolled housing.

In the 1987 constitution, Tondo was split into two congressional districts of Manila making the first district to the west while the second district in the east.

== Economy ==
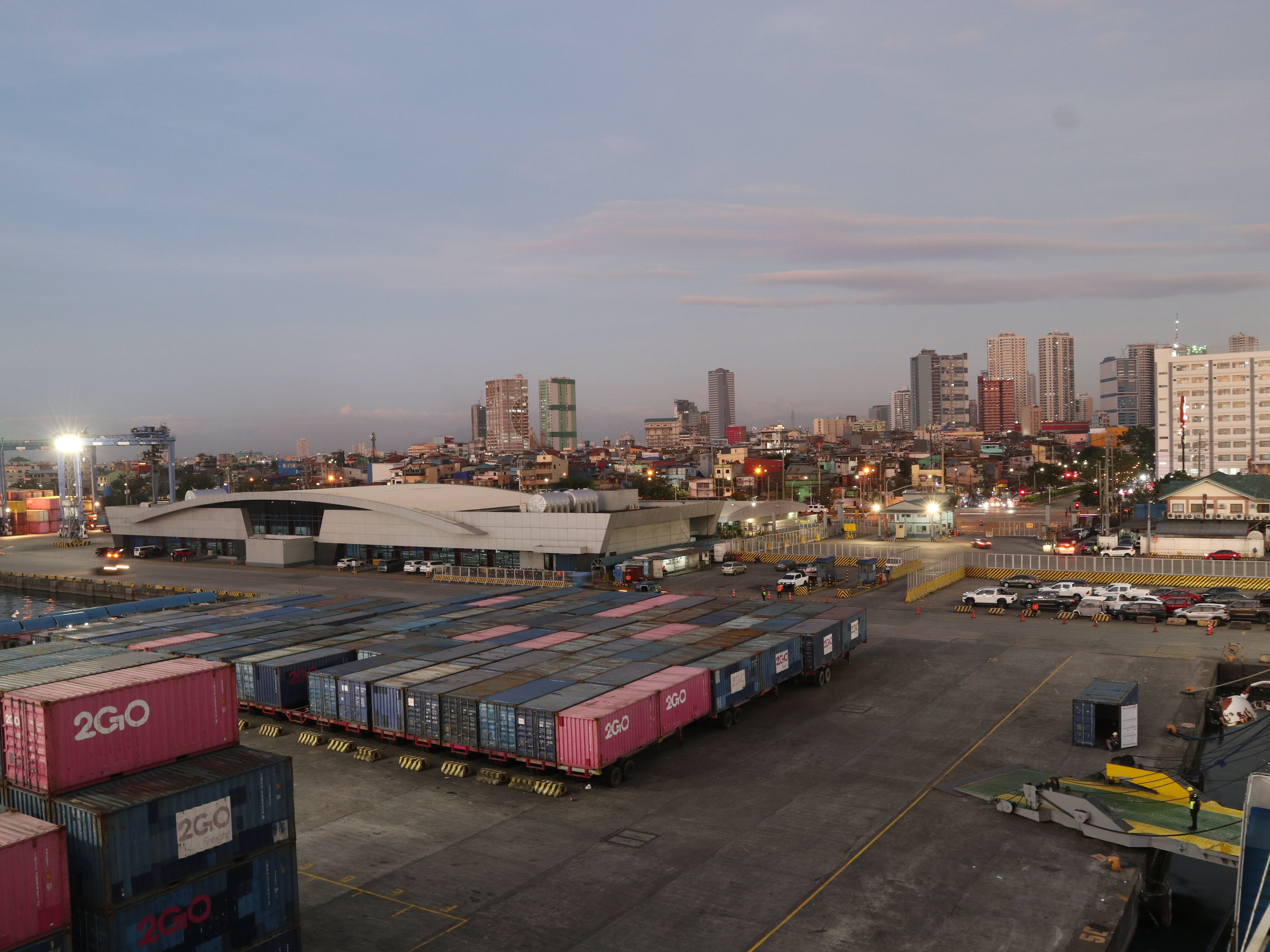
Manila North Harbor with Tondo skyline at the background

Tondo hosts the Manila North Harbor Port, the northern half of the Port of Manila, the primary seaport serving Metro Manila and surrounding areas.

The area also hosted Smokey Mountain, a landfill which served Metro Manila and employed thousands of people from around the 1960s until its closure in the late 1990s. The dumpsite served as a symbol of poverty even at least two decades after its closure.

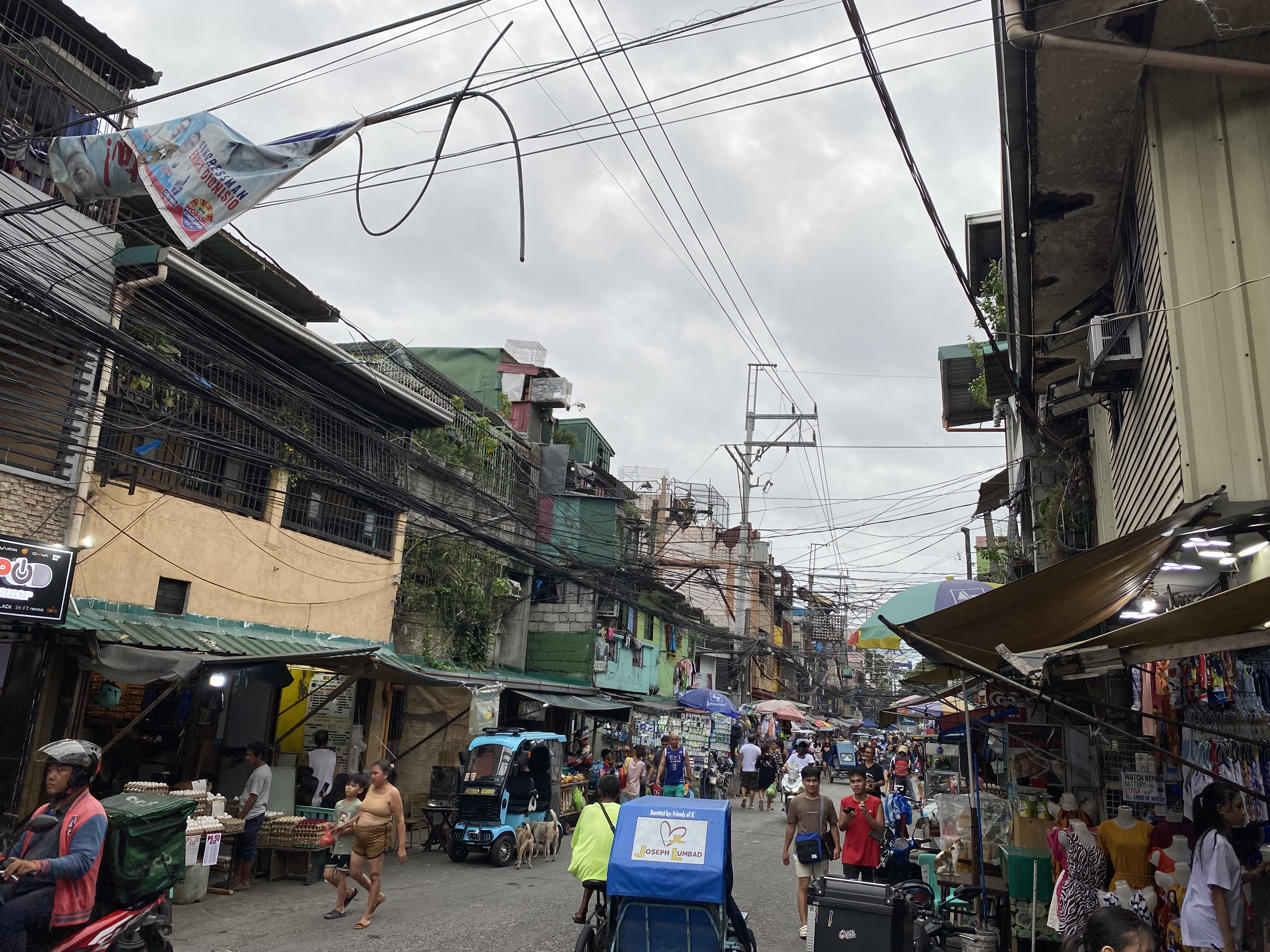
A busy street in Tondo

== Demographics ==
Urbanization as well as the Lina Law which favors squatting over land owners has resulted in Tondo being one of the most densely populated areas in the world at 69,000 inhabitants per square kilometer (180,000/sq mi).

=== Crime ===
Tondo has developed a reputation for criminality and poverty. In 2010, Manila records state that Tondo has the highest criminal rate in the whole city with the most common crime being pickpocketing.

=== Culture ===
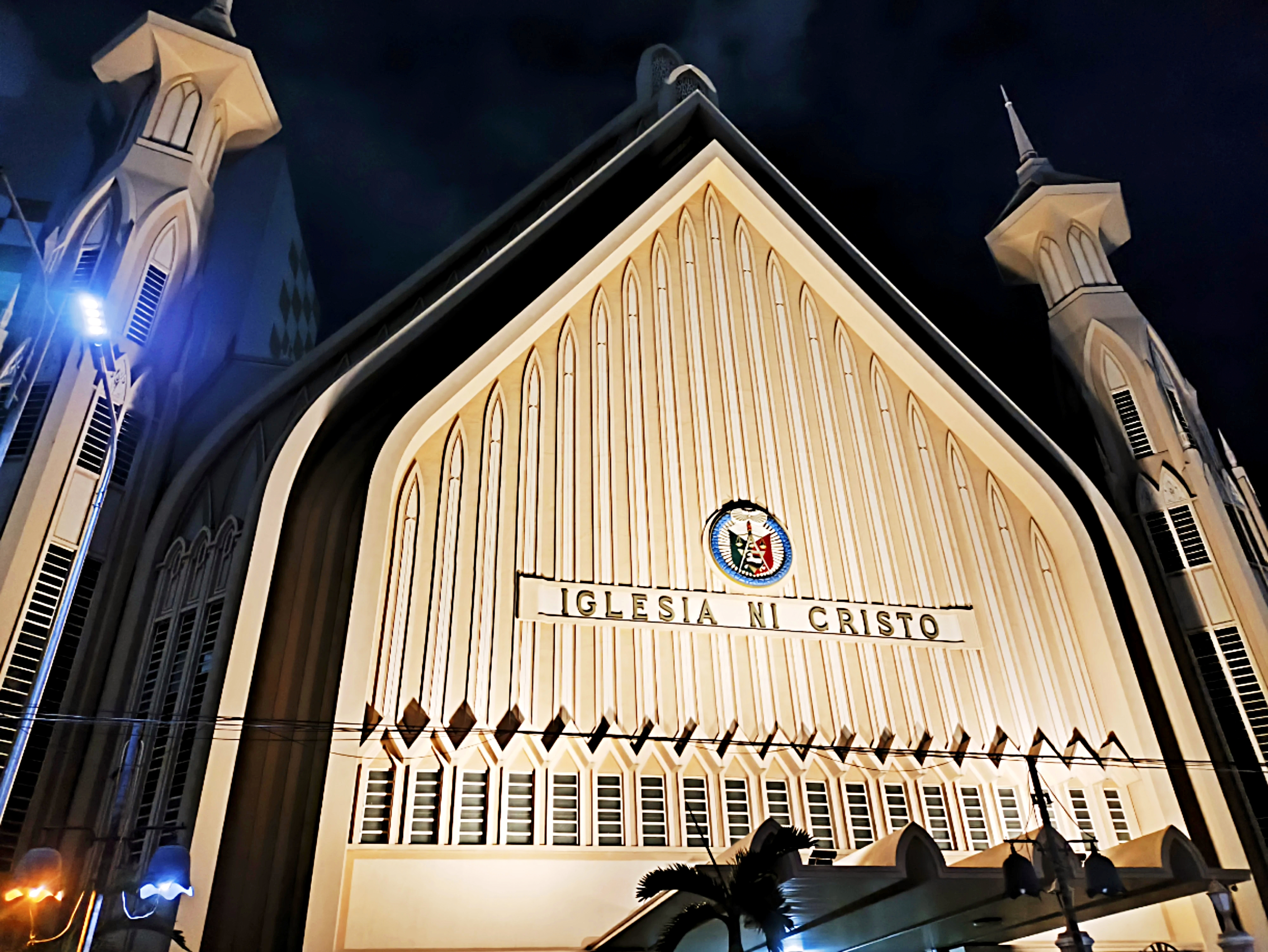
The Iglesia ni Cristo (INC) Lokal ng Tondo, established on November 6, 1915, is one of the earliest congregations of the church. The current structure was completed in 1967.

The district celebrates the feast of the Tondo Church annually in January, which is dedicated to the image of the Santo Niño housed within the 16th-century Augustinian Tondo Church. The Lakbayaw Street Dance Festival, a competition among Ati-Atihan groups and school, local and religious groups, served as the climax of the feast.

== Education ==
The Department of Education – Schools Division Office of Manila lists 26 public elementary schools and 11 public high schools in Tondo.

The Tondo Campus is a P400-million extension with 48 classrooms, 15 multifunction rooms and a gymnasium. In October 2024, Mayor Honey Lacuna and Felma Carlos-Tria led the time capsule lowering and groundbreaking of Universidad de Manilas's 10-storey school building in a 1,500-square-meter lot at Vitas Skate Park.

== Barangays ==
Tondo encompasses 267 barangays which can be grouped in districts and zones.

List of barangays in Tondo
First District
Barangay	Land area (km²)	Population (2020 census)
Zone 1
Barangay 1	0.04953 km²	2,995
Barangay 2	0.03787 km²	1,887
Barangay 3	0.03893 km²	1,341
Barangay 4	0.04018 km²	1,691
Barangay 5	0.02473 km²	1,288
Barangay 6	0.04150 km²	771
Barangay 7	0.04402 km²	1,560
Barangay 8	0.03638 km²	147
Barangay 9	0.01276 km²	447
Barangay 10	0.006060 km²	160
Zone 2
Barangay 11	0.01336 km²	2,758
Barangay 12	0.02056 km²	2,137
Barangay 13	0.01241 km²	2,371
Barangay 14	0.01447 km²	2,070
Barangay 15	0.006980 km²	1,119
Barangay 16	0.01059 km²	1,477
Barangay 17	0.009080 km²	1,176
Barangay 18	0.02325 km²	1,982
Barangay 19	0.01878 km²	2,272
Barangay 20	1.372 km²	45,772
Barangay 25	0.02200 km²	2,545
Barangay 26	0.01961 km²	2,555
Barangay 28	0.02258 km²	2,787
Barangay 29	0.07244 km²	4,406
Barangay 30	0.01179 km²	166
Barangay 31	0.01750 km²	2,881
Barangay 32	0.01606 km²	2,219
Zone 3
Barangay 33	0.02387 km²	4,082
Barangay 34	0.01156 km²	1,854
Barangay 35	0.01531 km²	2,265
Barangay 36	0.01173 km²	2,231
Barangay 37	0.009990 km²	2,057
Barangay 38	0.01394 km²	2,870
Barangay 39	0.1038 km²	2,324
Barangay 41	0.02111 km²	3,825
Barangay 42	0.01759 km²	2,142
Barangay 43	0.01292 km²	3,362
Barangay 44	0.05213 km²	800
Barangay 45	0.01765 km²	2,264
Barangay 46	0.01634 km²	2,088
Barangay 47	0.03325 km²	1,123
Zone 4
Barangay 48	0.01689 km²	4,070
Barangay 49	0.01984 km²	2,119
Barangay 50	0.03537 km²	4,217
Barangay 51	0.04022 km²	2,580
Barangay 52	0.02638 km²	2,732
Barangay 53	0.02453 km²	2,916
Barangay 54	0.02705 km²	1,648
Barangay 55	0.03648 km²	2,492
Zone 5
Barangay 56	0.05299 km²	3,457
Barangay 57	0.02752 km²	882
Barangay 58	0.02985 km²	3,719
Barangay 59	0.02256 km²	1,112
Barangay 60	0.01361 km²	4,503
Zone 6
Barangay 61	0.04362 km²	1,022
Barangay 62	0.02066 km²	1,967
Barangay 63	0.01866 km²	1,448
Barangay 64	0.01542 km²	495
Barangay 65	0.01938 km²	1,631
Barangay 66	0.02644 km²	2,956
Barangay 67	0.02007 km²	4,083
Barangay 68	0.007310 km²	1,115
Barangay 69	0.02362 km²	1,968
Barangay 70	0.01273 km²	2,344
Barangay 71	0.03982 km²	3,417
Barangay 72	0.02674 km²	3,233
Barangay 73	0.01038 km²	2,478
Barangay 74	0.02003 km²	1,039
Barangay 75	0.02651 km²	1,350
Zone 7
Barangay 76	0.01828 km²	1,844
Barangay 77	0.01281 km²	1,372
Barangay 78	0.01471 km²	1,221
Barangay 79	0.007830 km²	1,520
Barangay 80	0.01168 km²	2,553
Barangay 81	0.01771 km²	1,815
Barangay 82	0.02250 km²	2,642
Barangay 83	0.01402 km²	1,473
Barangay 84	0.01456 km²	1,141
Barangay 85	0.02539 km²	4,032
Barangay 86	0.02075 km²	1,415
Barangay 87	0.02072 km²	1,633
Barangay 88	0.009840 km²	1,096
Barangay 89	0.01241 km²	720
Barangay 90	0.009980 km²	630
Zone 8
Barangay 91	0.05655 km²	4,552
Barangay 92	0.02656 km²	2,639
Barangay 93	0.04385 km²	3,960
Barangay 94	0.09789 km²	2,178
Barangay 95	0.03333 km²	5,543
Barangay 96	0.08864 km²	2,100
Barangay 97	0.03041 km²	3,634
Barangay 98	0.01408 km²	1,899
Barangay 99	0.01293 km²	6,310
Barangay 100	0.02934 km²	2,222
Barangay 101	0.1038 km²	15,358
Barangay 102	0.02389 km²	4,157
Barangay 103	0.03294 km²	4,772
Barangay 104	0.03892 km²	5,741
Barangay 105	0.5062 km²	24,971
Barangay 106	0.07641 km²	2,513
Zone 9
Barangay 107	0.1578 km²	7,003
Barangay 108	0.03204 km²	5,391
Barangay 109	0.02678 km²	3,254
Barangay 110	0.1781 km²	2,677
Barangay 111	0.01452 km²	2,661
Barangay 112	0.02743 km²	5,593
Barangay 116	0.04229 km²	5,943
Barangay 117	0.02099 km²	4,160
Barangay 118	0.1419 km²	10,840
Barangay 119	0.01863 km²	2,345
Barangay 120	0.01699 km²	3,873
Barangay 121	0.02799 km²	4,511
Barangay 122	0.02322 km²	3,824
Barangay 123	0.09875 km²	8,660
Zone 10
Barangay 124	0.03070 km²	159
Barangay 125	0.01540 km²	4,510
Barangay 126	0.1365 km²	1,162
Barangay 127	0.04520 km²	565
Barangay 128	1.067 km²	23,702
Barangay 129	0.04715 km²	5,716
Zone 11
Barangay 130	0.03322 km²	1,758
Barangay 131	0.02571 km²	1,621
Barangay 132	0.04207 km²	925
Barangay 133	0.07548 km²	2,115
Barangay 134	0.03383 km²	1,058
Zone 12
Barangay 135	0.03240 km²	1,935
Barangay 136	0.02872 km²	1,197
Barangay 137	0.03017 km²	911
Barangay 138	0.02568 km²	2,939
Barangay 139	0.007160 km²	371
Barangay 140	0.03246 km²	543
Barangay 141	0.006960 km²	529
Barangay 142	0.01676 km²	1,710
Barangay 143	0.01029 km²	1,401
Barangay 144	0.03131 km²	880
Barangay 145	0.01763 km²	1,029
Barangay 146	0.03743 km²	2,895
Second District
Zone 13
Barangay 147	0.1300 km²	2,275
Barangay 148	0.1047 km²	2,333
Barangay 149	0.02148 km²	1,554
Barangay 150	0.04766 km²	2,277
Barangay 151	0.05243 km²	1,639
Zone 14
Barangay 152	0.02517 km²	6,218
Barangay 153	0.02093 km²	2,051
Barangay 154	0.02421 km²	948
Barangay 155	0.01807 km²	3,257
Barangay 156	0.04336 km²	1,615
Barangay 157	0.01802 km²	1,505
Barangay 158	0.02412 km²	1,934
Barangay 159	0.01371 km²	1,558
Barangay 160	0.01494 km²	1,256
Barangay 161	0.03005 km²	1,004
Barangay 162	0.02344 km²	556
Barangay 163	0.04533 km²	3,840
Barangay 164	0.02660 km²	1,807
Barangay 165	0.02269 km²	1,014
Zone 15
Barangay 166	0.03358 km²	882
Barangay 167	0.02876 km²	926
Barangay 168	0.03009 km²	1,387
Barangay 169	0.02741 km²	914
Barangay 170	0.01939 km²	1,378
Barangay 171	0.02704 km²	1,124
Barangay 172	0.04526 km²	1,210
Barangay 173	0.03045 km²	1,616
Barangay 174	0.02559 km²	715
Barangay 175	0.03679 km²	988
Barangay 176	0.04428 km²	1,278
Zone 16
Barangay 177	0.1371 km²	3,308
Barangay 178	0.02283 km²	1,519
Barangay 179	0.03228 km²	1,021
Barangay 180	0.03520 km²	2,145
Barangay 181	0.01847 km²	2,773
Barangay 182	0.05269 km²	3,936
Barangay 183	0.04116 km²	8,424
Barangay 184	0.04504 km²	3,311
Barangay 185	0.03429 km²	3,532
Barangay 186	0.04620 km²	1,678
Zone 17
Barangay 187	0.01100 km²	886
Barangay 188	0.01397 km²	865
Barangay 189	0.02422 km²	1,481
Barangay 190	0.01556 km²	1,232
Barangay 191	0.01048 km²	703
Barangay 192	0.03407 km²	1,878
Barangay 193	0.01132 km²	979
Barangay 194	0.01699 km²	775
Barangay 195	0.01056 km²	1,401
Barangay 196	0.02015 km²	1,631
Barangay 197	0.01453 km²	523
Zone 18
Barangay 198	0.04329 km²	5,032
Barangay 199	0.03578 km²	3,471
Barangay 200	0.01520 km²	1,666
Barangay 201	0.05224 km²	1,152
Barangay 202	0.03268 km²	1,420
Barangay 202-A	0.01950 km²	1,213
Barangay 203	0.06060 km²	2,462
Barangay 204	0.05164 km²	2,684
Barangay 205	0.04640 km²	1,760
Zone 19
Barangay 206	0.04145 km²	2,433
Barangay 207	0.04955 km²	1,541
Barangay 208	0.03002 km²	635
Barangay 209	0.06273 km²	5,075
Barangay 210	0.03629 km²	3,212
Barangay 211	0.03119 km²	2,007
Barangay 212	0.02913 km²	2,675
Zone 20
Barangay 213	0.03187 km²	3,231
Barangay 214	0.01596 km²	1,577
Barangay 215	0.01780 km²	3,106
Barangay 216	0.03176 km²	2,431
Barangay 217	0.02803 km²	1,263
Barangay 218	0.02250 km²	321
Barangay 219	0.03687 km²	1,080
Barangay 220	0.05358 km²	1,270
Zone 21
Barangay 221	0.02506 km²	3,353
Barangay 222	0.01733 km²	2,040
Barangay 223	0.01887 km²	1,629
Barangay 224	0.03784 km²	1,069
Barangay 225	0.01565 km²	2,419
Barangay 226	0.02445 km²	1,562
Barangay 227	0.04637 km²	1,836
Barangay 228	0.01517 km²	3,010
Barangay 229	0.01879 km²	1,545
Barangay 230	0.01091 km²	2,364
Barangay 231	0.02429 km²	1,888
Barangay 232	0.03739 km²	1,778
Barangay 233	0.02135 km²	735
Zone 22
Barangay 234	0.04128 km²	1,945
Barangay 235	0.02426 km²	1,557
Barangay 236	0.02861 km²	801
Barangay 237	0.02222 km²	452
Barangay 238	0.01655 km²	364
Barangay 239	0.02265 km²	1,785
Barangay 240	0.01350 km²	56
Barangay 241	0.08630 km²	447
Barangay 242	0.02383 km²	448
Barangay 243	0.01484 km²	436
Barangay 244	0.01323 km²	640
Barangay 245	0.01004 km²	281
Barangay 246	0.01857 km²	1,254
Barangay 247	0.01411 km²	737
Barangay 248	0.008640 km²	503
Zone 23
Barangay 249	0.01475 km²	1,610
Barangay 250	0.03508 km²	1,182
Barangay 251	0.009610 km²	1,181
Barangay 252	0.008880 km²	910
Barangay 253	0.02374 km²	1,329
Barangay 254	0.04850 km²	3,713
Barangay 255	0.02253 km²	1,086
Barangay 256	0.02140 km²	1,030
Barangay 257	0.01151 km²	1,308
Barangay 258	0.02197 km²	1,181
Barangay 259	0.06758 km²	2,090
Zone 24
Barangay 260	0.03956 km²	1,641
Barangay 261	0.01545 km²	735
Barangay 262	0.04478 km²	1,736
Barangay 263	0.01511 km²	1,306
Barangay 264	0.02586 km²	2,443
Barangay 265	0.01479 km²	125
Barangay 266	0.02719 km²	1,665
Barangay 267	0.01300 km²	1,952

== Notable people ==
Historical figures

- Andrés Bonifacio, Filipino revolutionary leader
- Emilio Jacinto, Filipino revolutionary leader
- Lakandula or Lakan Dula (1503–1575), the last ruler of pre-colonial Tondo when the Spaniards first conquered the lands of the Pasig River delta in the Philippines in the 1570s

Business

- Ramon Ang, businessman, chairman and CEO of San Miguel Corporation
- Manuel Villar, businessman, chairman and CEO of Vista Land, Vista Mall and Villar Group of Companies, Former senate president, senator, congressman

Crime

- Asiong Salonga, gangster known as the "King of Tondo"

Arts, Literature, media and journalism

- Damián Domingo, was a father of Philippine painter
- José Palma, playwright
- Lualhati Bautista, novelist
- Amado V. Hernandez, National Artist for Literature
- Levi Celerio, National Artist for Music and Literature
- Arnold Clavio, journalist and television news anchor
- Cherie Mercado, journalist and television news anchor

Entertainment

- Ate Gay, comedian
- Irma Adlawan, actress
- Jose Manalo, comedian, actor
- Francine Diaz, actress and model
- McCoy de Leon, actor and dancer
- Valerie Concepcion, actress
- Gina Alajar, actress and director
- Wendell Ramos, actor
- Geneva Cruz, actress, singer, and composer
- Rene Requiestas, comedian
- Dolphy, comedian
- RK Bagatsing, actor
- Vice Ganda, comedian
- Raymond Bagatsing, actor
- Jerald Napoles, actor
- Joyce Pring, actress
- Mila del Sol, actress
- Esang de Torres, singer
- Mona Lisa, actress
- Chichay, comedian
- Amy Austria, actress
- Ricky Belmonte, actor
- Charito Solis, actress
- Tito Arevalo, actor
- Rudy Fernandez, actor and producer
- Dely Atay-Atayan, comedian
- Arnel Pineda, singer and the current vocalist of American rock band Journey
- Regine Velasquez-Alcasid, singer and songwriter
- Jay Manalo, actor and model
- Kyla, singer
- Katrina Velarde, singer

Medical Cardiologist

- Willie Ong, cardiologist

Politics

- Antonio Villegas, served as Mayor of Manila from 1962 to 1971
- Arturo M. Tolentino, diplomat
- Alfredo Lim, served as Mayor of Manila from 1992 to 1998 and 2007 to 2013
- Carmen Planas, politician, became the first woman elected to any public office in the Philippines in 1934
- Florin Hilbay, lawyer
- Isko Moreno, incumbent Mayor of Manila
- Ramon Bagatsing, Mayor of Manila from 1972 to 1986
- Joseph Estrada, President of the Philippines from 1998 to 2001, Mayor of Manila from 2013 to 2019
- Narciso G. Reyes, former ambassador, diplomat, former Chairman of UNICEF, and 4th Secretary General of the Association of Southeast Asian Nations (ASEAN)
- Sonia Roco, chairwoman of the political party Aksyon Demokratiko

Sports

- Carlos Badion, basketball player
- Ernest Obiena, pole vaulter
- Lanie Ortillo, football player
