= Arevalo Church =

Roman Catholic church in Iloilo City, Philippines

- Archdiocesan Shrine of Santo Niño de Arevalo
- The Most Holy Name of Jesus Parish
- Pang-Arkidiyosesis na Dambana ng Banal na Bata ng Arevalo at Parokya ng Kabanal-Banalang Ngalan ng ating Panginoon Hesus (Filipino); Santuario Arquidiocesano de Santo Niño de Arévalo y Parroquia del Santísimo Nombre de Jesús (Spanish)
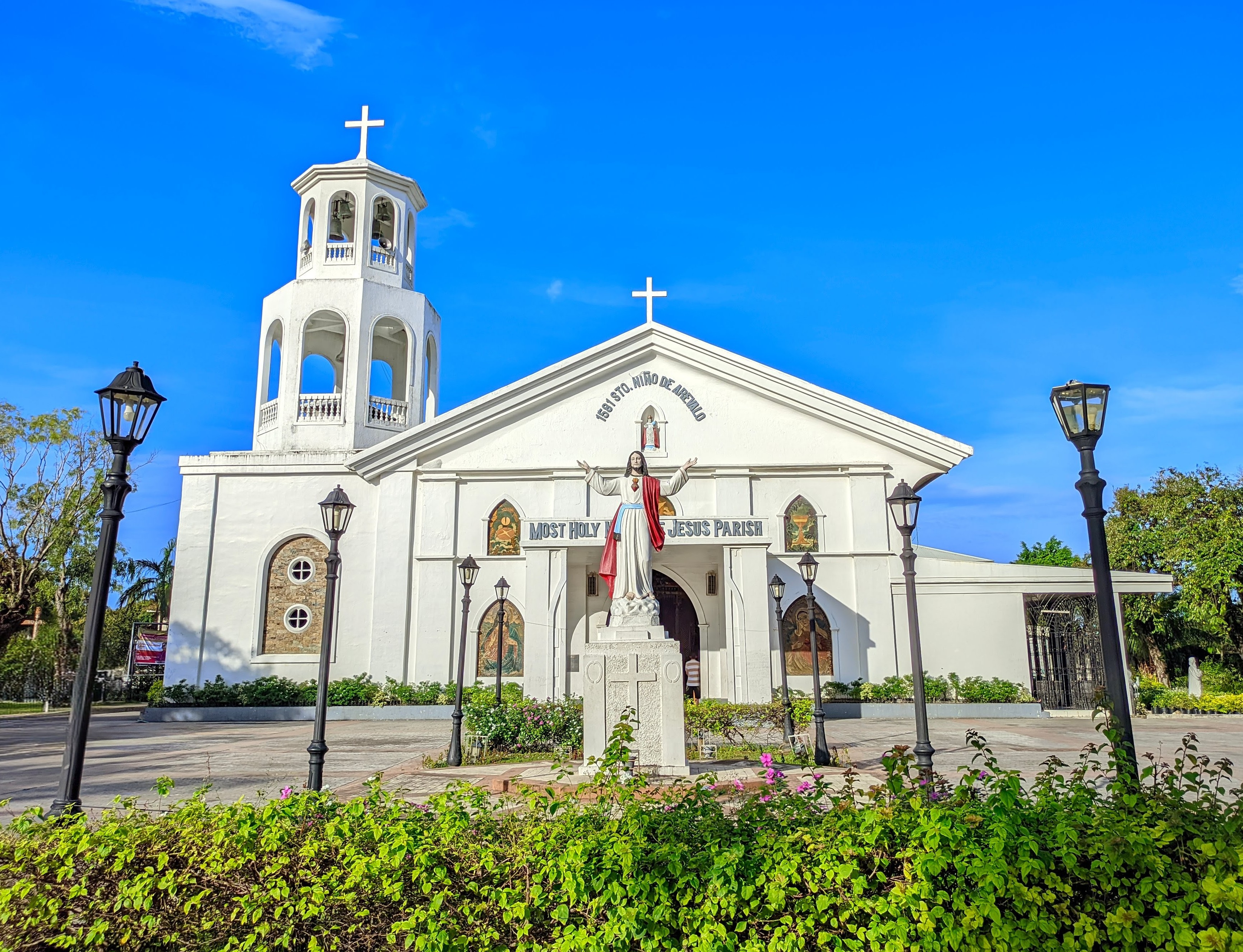
- Church façade in November 2025

- Location within Visayas Location within Philippines
- 10°41′16″N 122°30′56″E
- Location: Arevalo, Iloilo City
- Country: Philippines
- Denomination: Catholic Church

History
- Founded: 1582; 444 years ago
- Dedication: Santo Niño de Arévalo
- Consecrated: 1869; 157 years ago

Architecture
- Functional status: Active
- Style: Baroque

Administration
- Province: Iloilo
- Archdiocese: Jaro

Clergy
- Archbishop: Archbishop Midyphil Billones
- Priest: Joenick Territorio

The Archdiocesan Shrine of Santo Niño de Arevalo, also known as The Most Holy Name of Jesus Parish and Arevalo Church, is a Roman Catholic church located in the district of Arevalo in Iloilo City, Philippines. It houses the Santo Niño de Arevalo, the third oldest image of the Holy Child in the Philippines. It is under the Archdiocese of Jaro.

== History ==
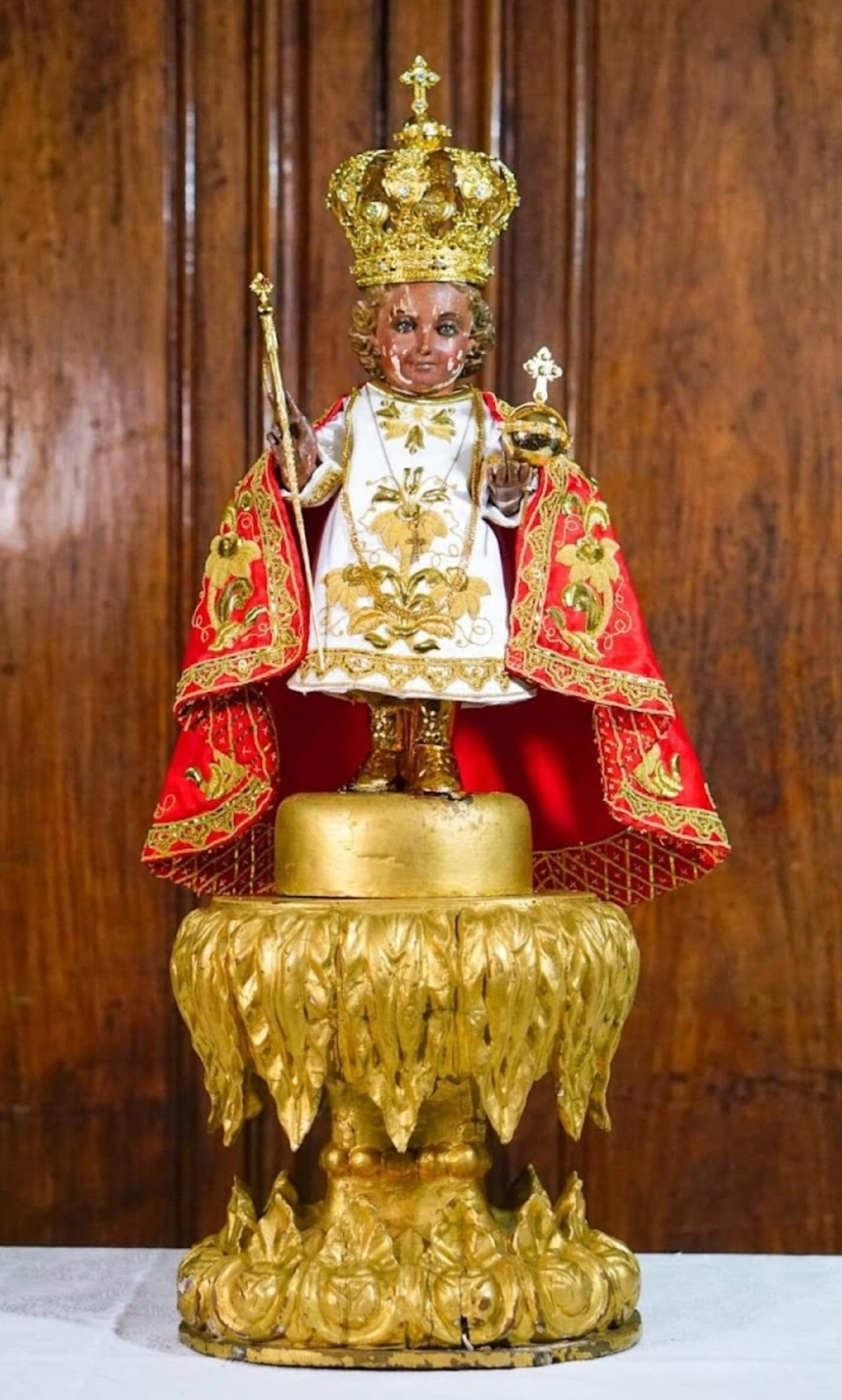
The original image of Santo Niño de Arévalo, the third oldest image of the Holy Child in the Philippines.

The parish was established in 1582, with Fr. Diego Velasquez appointed as the first parish priest. By the late 16th century, Arevalo had surpassed the settlement of Oton, becoming the administrative and religious center for Spanish officials on Panay Island. In 1584, the Augustinian order took over the parish, appointing Fr. Juan Montoya, O.S.A. as parish priest. However, due to a shortage of friars, the Augustinians left in 1587, and the parish was handed over to the Jesuits, and later to the secular clergy.

In 1868, under the leadership of Fr. Anselmo Avanceña, the church underwent its second major reconstruction, which was completed in 1869. Fr. Avanceña also built the Convento de Arevalo and erected a monument in honor of Spain's Queen Isabela II. The church's most distinctive feature is its location in the center of the town plaza, a rare design compared to other churches in the Philippines, which are typically located at the edge of town.

The image of Santo Niño or the Holy Child, believed to be miraculous, has long been credited with protecting the town from Moro raids, droughts, locust infestations, and other challenges. The original Santo Niño image is kept in the Convento de Arevalo for safekeeping, while a replica is enshrined in the church.

The church and convent have endured several calamities, including the destruction of the convent during World War II when American forces set it on fire to prevent it from being used by advancing Japanese troops. Despite the fire, the church and the Santo Niño image remained unharmed. In 1948, a devastating earthquake struck the region, but the image of Santo Niño remained intact.

On January 16, 2022, the church was declared an Archdiocesan Shrine of Santo Niño de Arevalo by Jaro Archbishop Jose Romeo Lazo, making it the third shrine of the Archdiocese of Jaro, following St. Vincent Ferrer in Leganes and Our Lady of Fatima in Jaro.

== Architecture ==
Arevalo Church features a distinctive and functional architectural design that reflects both Spanish colonial and local influences. The church is known for its massive four-bodied bell tower, located on the gospel side of the building. The tower's base is quadrangular, and it is composed of two levels of octagonal belfries. These belfries are pierced with arch openings, with the lower level being larger than the one above it. The bell tower is capped with a pyramidal roof and topped with a cross, making it a prominent feature of the church's exterior.

The church's entrance is marked by a portico that greets visitors as they approach. Above the portico, the inscription "Most Holy Name of Jesus" can be seen. The main entryway consists of a large arch door, which leads into the interior. The façade of the church is clean and simple, ornamented with four pilasters that give it a sense of symmetry. It features five lancet windows with stained glass panes: one above the main door and two flanking it on either side.

The pediment of the church is relatively plain, with the exception of a niche at the center that houses the image of the Holy Child (Santo Niño). Above this niche are the words "1581 St. Niño de Arevalo," commemorating the year the image was brought to the town.

The church is surrounded by a plaza, where a statue of the Sacred Heart of Jesus stands as an additional religious focal point of the area.
