= Santo Niño de Arévalo =

Title of the Child Jesus in the Catholic Church

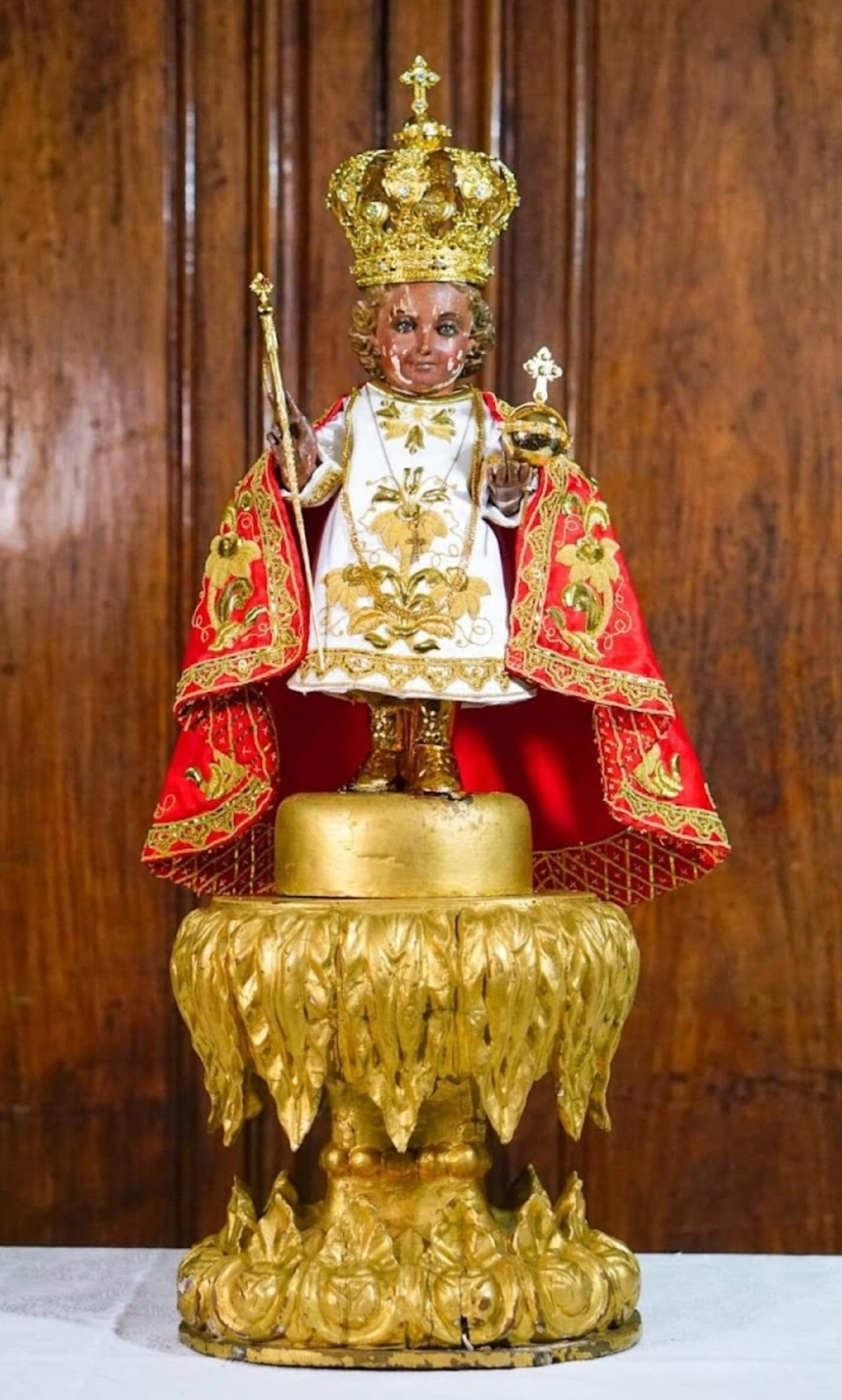
- Original image of Santo Niño de Arévalo
- Location: Arevalo, Iloilo City, Philippines
- Date: 1581
- Witness: Gonzalo Ronquillo de Peñalosa
- Type: Wooden statue
- Approval: Abp. Jose Romeo Lazo
- Venerated in: Catholic Church
- Shrine: Archdiocesan Shrine of Santo Niño de Arevalo and the Parish of the Most Holy Name of Jesus
- Patronage: Arevalo, Iloilo City
- Attributes: crown, sceptre, globus cruciger, dark skin, maroon mantle, gold boots, sash
- Feast day: Third Sunday in January

The Santo Niño de Arévalo is a Filipino Roman Catholic title of the Holy Child, associated with a Christ Child image in the island of Panay in the Philippines. This is the third oldest image of the Holy Child in the Philippines, after the Santo Niño de Cebú and Santo Niño de Tondo. It was belived to be brought by Spanish Governor General Gonzalo Ronquillo de Peñalosa in 1581 to the town of La Villa Rica de Arévalo, now known as district of Arevalo in Iloilo City.

The district of Arevalo celebrates its fiesta in honor of the Santo Niño de Arevalo every third Sunday of January – a week before the staging of Iloilo City's Dinagyang Festival that celebrates the coming of the replica of Santo Niño de Cebu to Iloilo in 1968. On January 16, 2022, the Santo Niño de Arevalo was episcopally crowned by Jaro Archbishop Jose Romeo Lazo.

== History ==
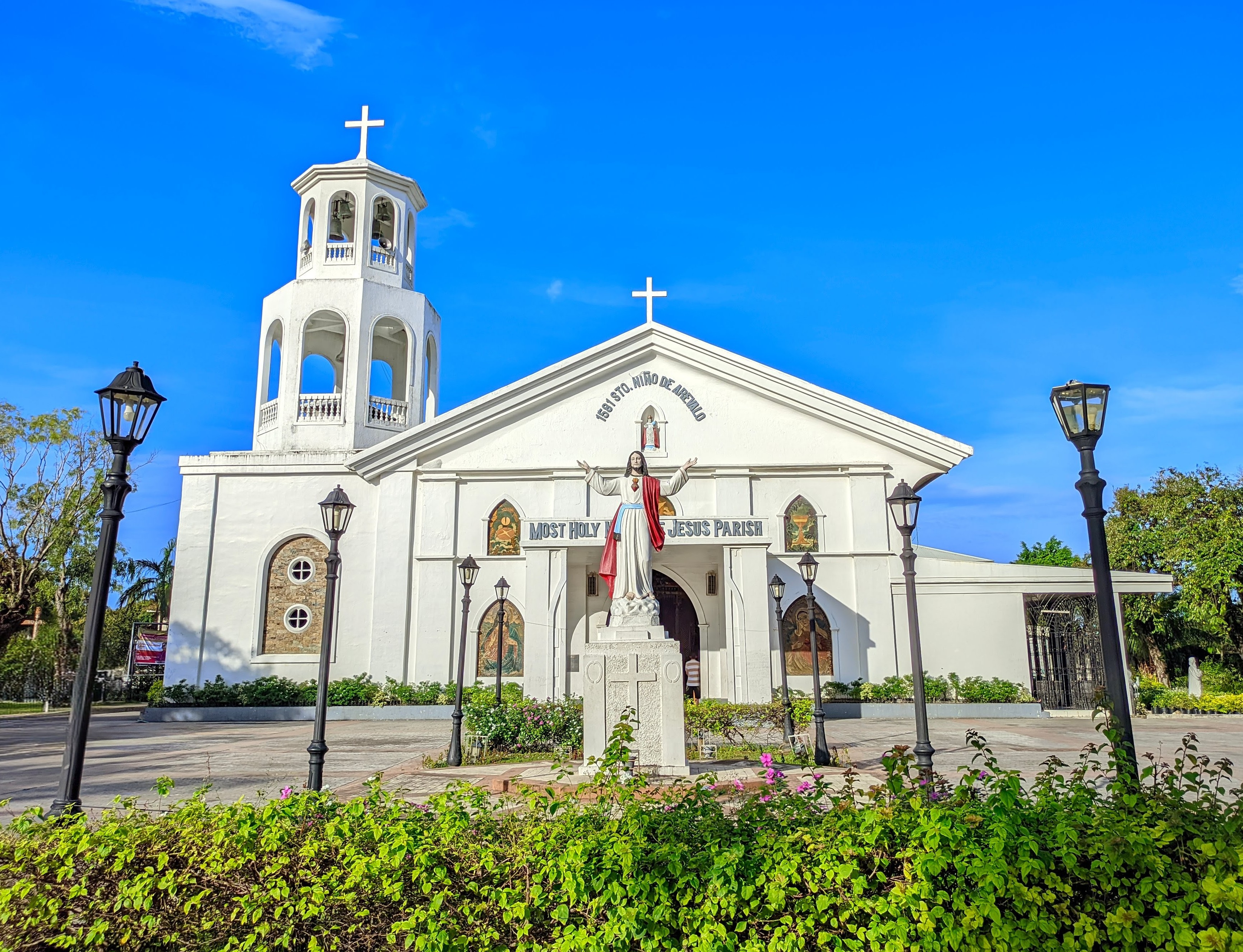
The Most Holy Name of Jesus Parish, Archdiocesan Shrine of Santo Niño de Arevalo in Arevalo, Iloilo City

In 1581, under the governance of Governor General Gonzalo Ronquillo de Peñalosa, La Villa Rica de Arévalo was officially founded, becoming the center of Spanish exploration in Panay. The settlement was named after the governor's hometown in Spain. This same year marked the introduction of the image of Santo Niño to Panay, making it the third oldest Santo Niño image in the Philippines, after Cebu and Tondo.

The following year, in 1582, Santo Niño de Arevalo was declared a parish, with Fr. Diego Velasquez serving as its first parish priest. The settlement quickly surpassed Oton in significance, becoming the residence of Spanish officials in the region. The Augustinians took over in 1584, with Fr. Juan Montoya, O.S.A. as the parish priest.

Due to various challenges, including Moro raids and Dutch attacks, the Spaniards eventually relocated to Fort San Pedro in La Punta (Iloilo City Proper). The church, with a history of destruction and reconstruction, has been contemporary, undergoing numerous rebuilds over several centuries.

In 1868, Fr. Anselmo Avancena initiated the construction of the Convento de Arevalo and the second reconstruction of the church, completed in 1869. Notably, the church features a unique location in the middle of the plaza, distinguishing it from others in the country.

The image of Santo Niño in Santo Niño de Arevalo Parish Church is believed to be miraculous, providing protection to the townsfolk during attacks, droughts, locust infestations, and other tribulations. A replica is housed in the church, while the original image is kept in the Convento de Arevalo for safekeeping.

On January 16, 2022, Santo Niño de Arevalo was declared the Archdiocesan Shrine of Santo Niño de Arevalo, and the image was crowned by Jaro Archbishop Jose Romeo Lazo. This declaration marked a significant milestone, making it the third shrine within the archdiocese, alongside St. Vincent Ferrer in Leganes and Our Lady of Fatima in Jaro.

== See also ==
- Santo Niño de Cebú
- Santo Niño de Tondo
