= Arevalo Plaza =

Public plaza in Arevalo, Iloilo City

Ramon Avanceña Park
- Arevalo Plaza
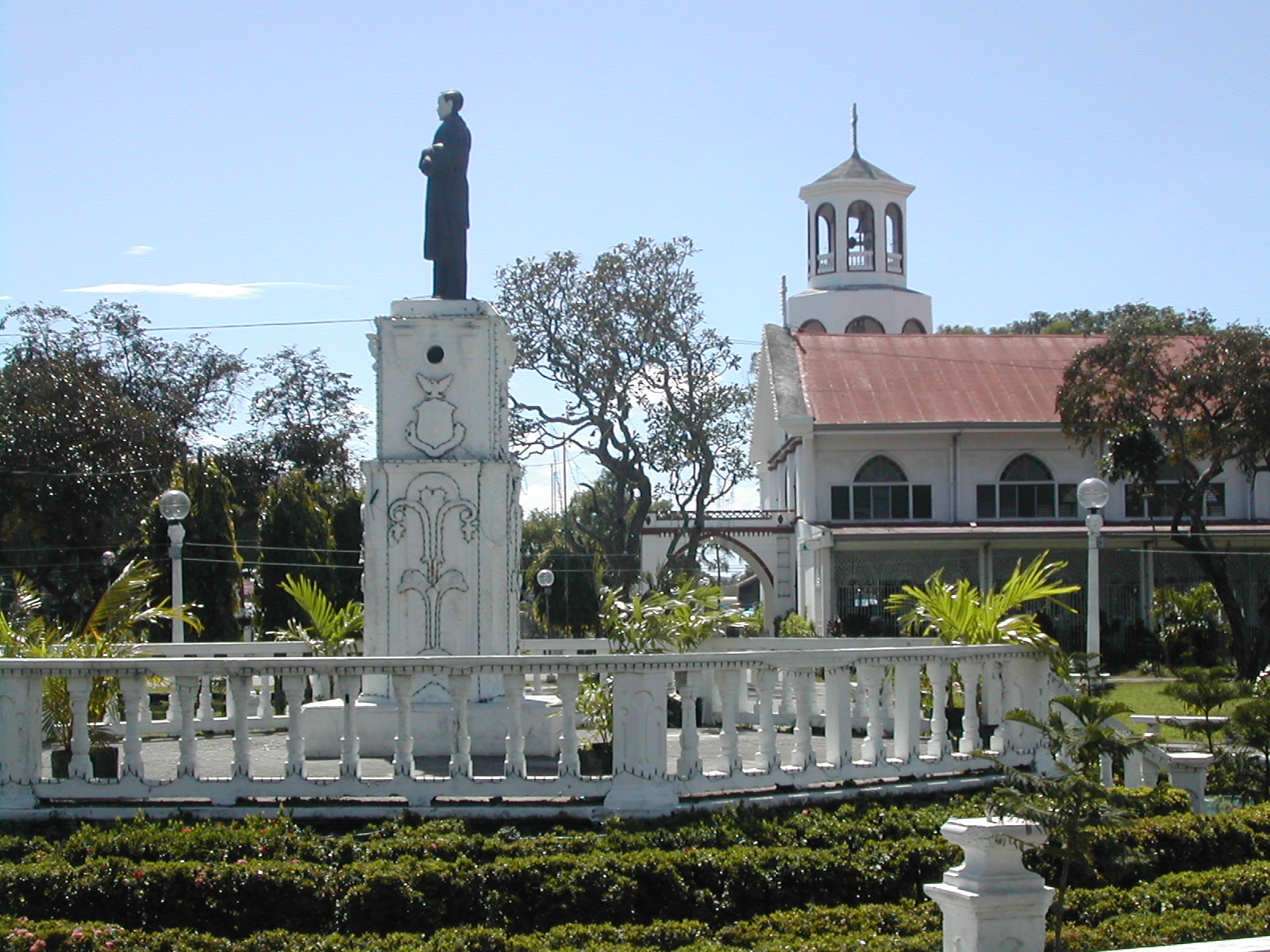
- The statue of Jose Rizal with the Archdiocesan Shrine of Santo Niño de Arevalo in the background
- Interactive map of Ramon Avanceña Park
- Type: Urban park, town square
- Location: Arevalo, Iloilo City, Philippines
- Coordinates: 10°41′17.052″N 122°30′58.2768″E
- Area: 1.1 hectares (2.7 acres)
- Created: 1851
- Etymology: Ramon Avanceña

Ramon Avanceña Park, also known as Arevalo Plaza or Plaza Villa, is an urban park and plaza located in the district of Arevalo in Iloilo City, Philippines. It is part of a cultural heritage zone of the district.

The Archdiocesan Shrine of Santo Niño de Arevalo, home to the third-oldest Holy Child image in the Philippines, is located on the plaza. The plaza also features newly landscaped and historical monuments such as the art-deco-styled Rizal monument and a fluted column topped by a crown, dedicated to the former queen of Spain, Isabel II. Dating back to the mid-19th century, this monument was declared a national cultural landmark in 2019.

The plaza was established in 1851 and was renamed in 2019 after Ramon Avanceña, a native and former Chief Justice of the Philippines.

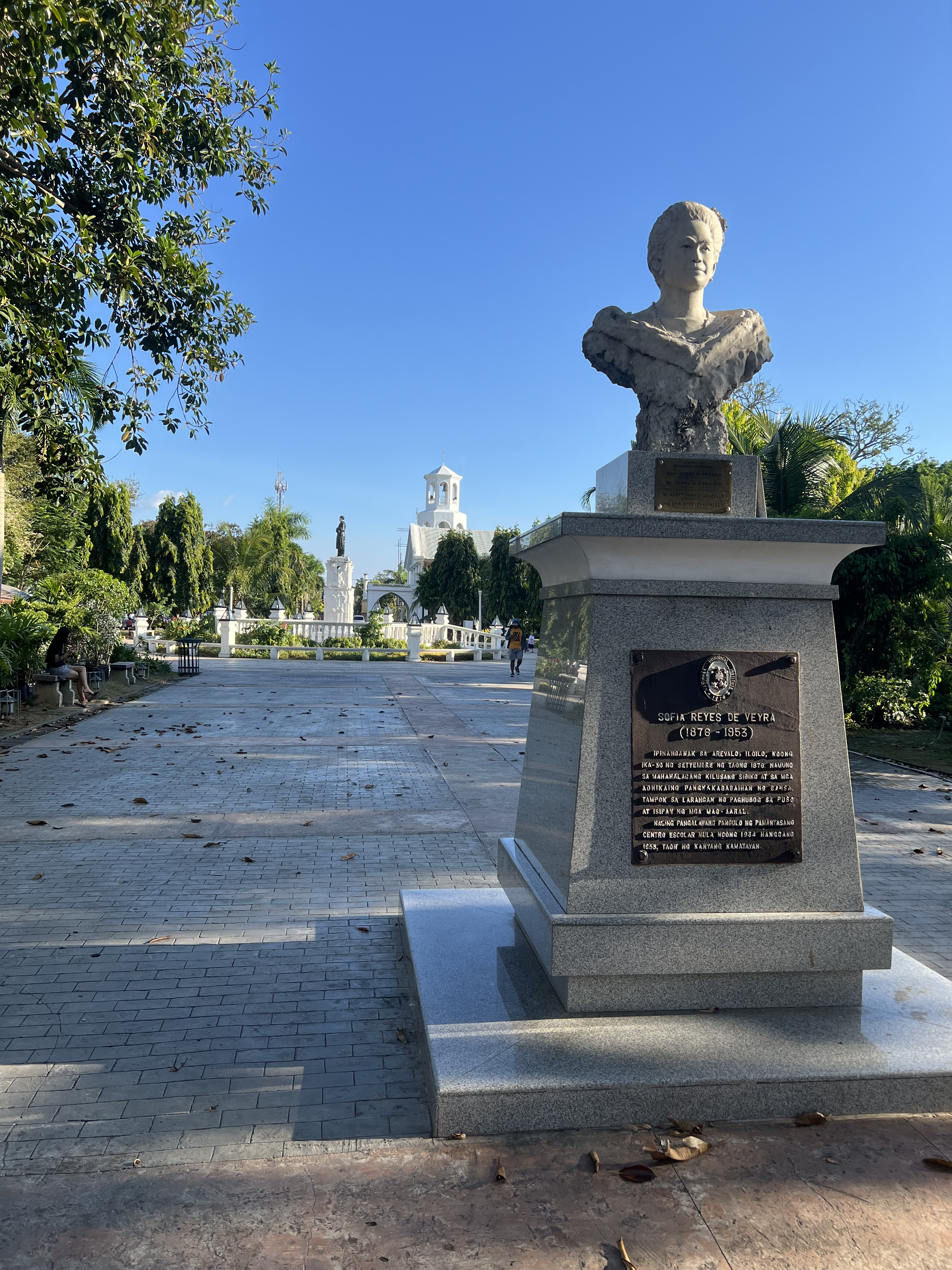
Bust of Sofia Reyes de Veyra with the Arevalo Church in the background
