= San Vicente Ferrer Church (Leganes, Iloilo) =

Roman Catholic church in Iloilo, Philippines

Leganes Church
- San Vicente Ferrer Parish Church
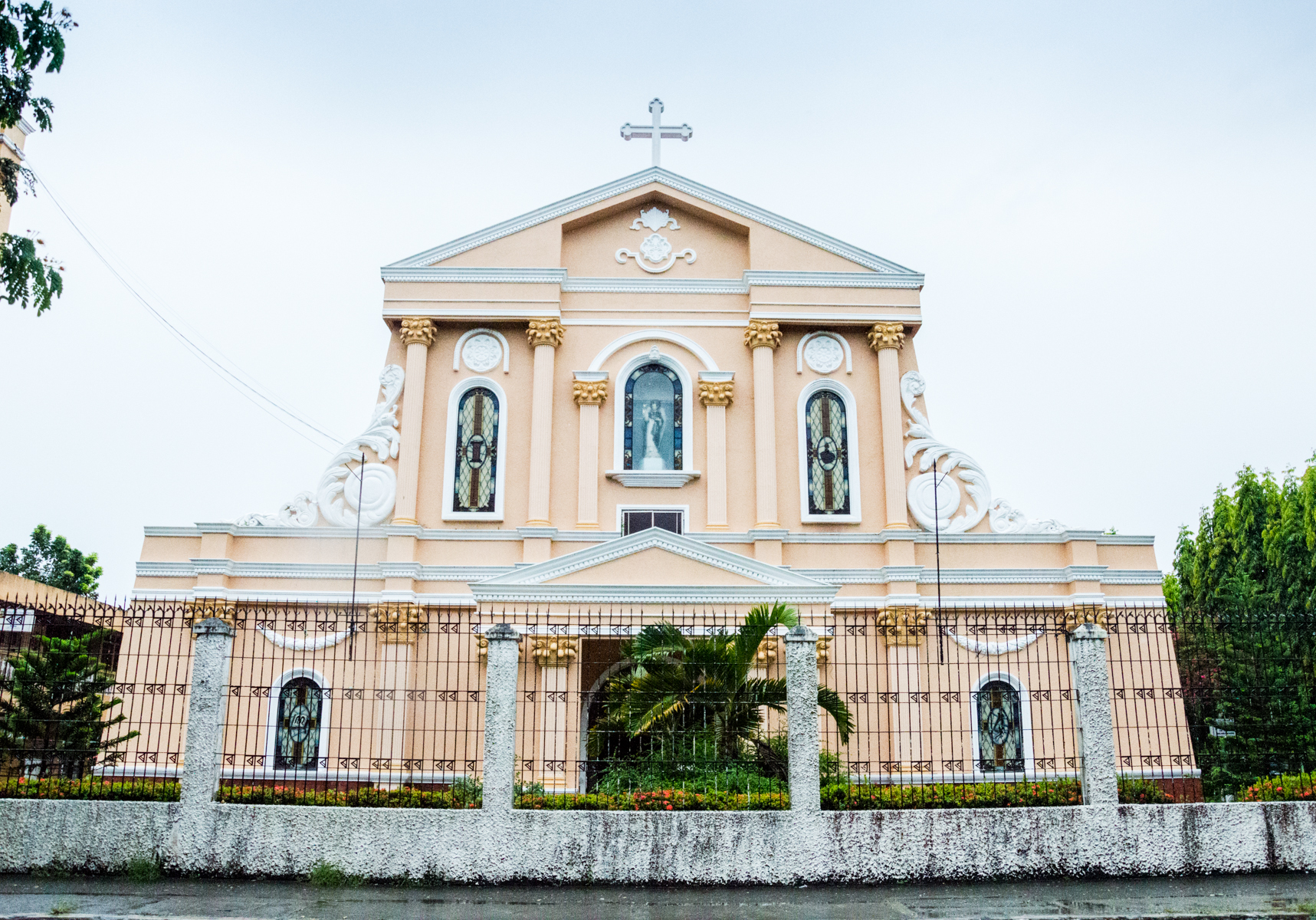
- Church facade in 2014

- Location in the Visayas Location in the Philippines
- 10°47′11″N 122°35′25″E
- Location: Leganes, Iloilo
- Country: Philippines
- Denomination: Roman Catholic

History
- Status: Parish Church and Archdiocesan Shrine
- Founded: 1869
- Founder: Friar Andres Naves
- Dedication: St. Vincent Ferrer

Architecture
- Functional status: Active
- Architectural type: Church building
- Style: Neoclassical
- Completed: 1889

Specifications
- Materials: Reinforced Concrete

Administration
- Province: Jaro
- Archdiocese: Jaro

Clergy
- Archbishop: Archbishop Midyphil Billones
- Priest(s): Very Rev. Msgr. Elmer T. Tababa, PC

The Archdiocesan Shrine of Saint Vincent Ferrer, commonly known as Leganes Church, is a neoclassical church dedicated to Saint Vincent Ferrer in Leganes, Iloilo, Philippines under the Roman Catholic Archdiocese of Jaro. Its current structure is a result of the numerous restoration efforts which was a necessity because of man-made and natural disasters.

== History ==
The current San Vicente Ferrer Church was a product of repairs and reconstructions. The first was completed in 1889 under the patronage of Father Eladio Zamora using the materials of tabigue, bamboo and brickwork. It replaced the old chapel which was constructed out of local indigenous materials. The adjoining convent was made out of local wood while the adjacent cemetery was bordered by a bamboo fence.

Strong winds and rain damaged the church and rendered the convent useless during the typhoon that happened on May 10, 1896. Repairs were initiated by Father Fulgencio Rodriguez on the church. Two years after the tragic event, Augustinians handed the church over to the secular priests who have given assistance to the natives since the evangelization started.

On January 25, 1948, the church was severely damaged when the Lady Caycay earthquake with a magnitude of 8.2 struck the whole of Panay Island. The shocks lasted for 70 seconds which devastated almost all the heritage churches within the island. Also recovering from World War II which destroyed its church records, the church reconstruction only went underway during the 1950s with an addition of a separate bell tower and other supplementary buildings.

== Architecture ==
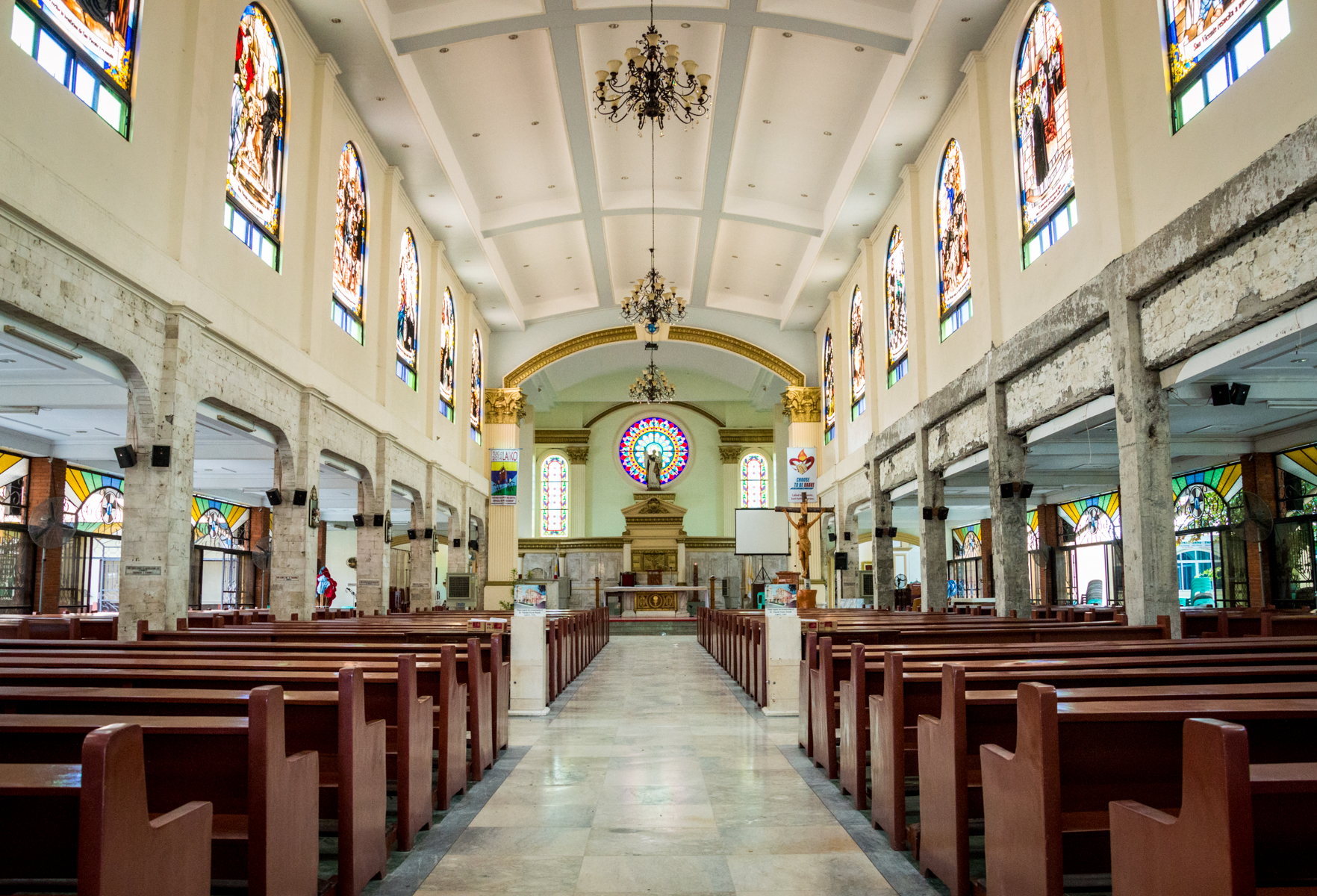
Church interior in 2014

The facade is neoclassical expressed through the columns and the pediments at the center with fenestration of arched doorways and windows. The interior is filled with colorful stained glass windows. One of which is an oculus located at the sanctuary wall that lights up the sculpture of St. Vincent Ferrer. Life of the saint is depicted through these stained windows which include his birth, his baptism, the apparition of the Virgin Mary to him, and his death.

It has a central nave and two aisles with lower ceilings flanking it. In front of the right aisle is a simple altar of Jesus and Mary while the baptistery ends the left aisle.
