= Leganes, Iloilo =

Municipality in Iloilo, Philippines

Leganes
- Municipality
- Municipality of Leganes
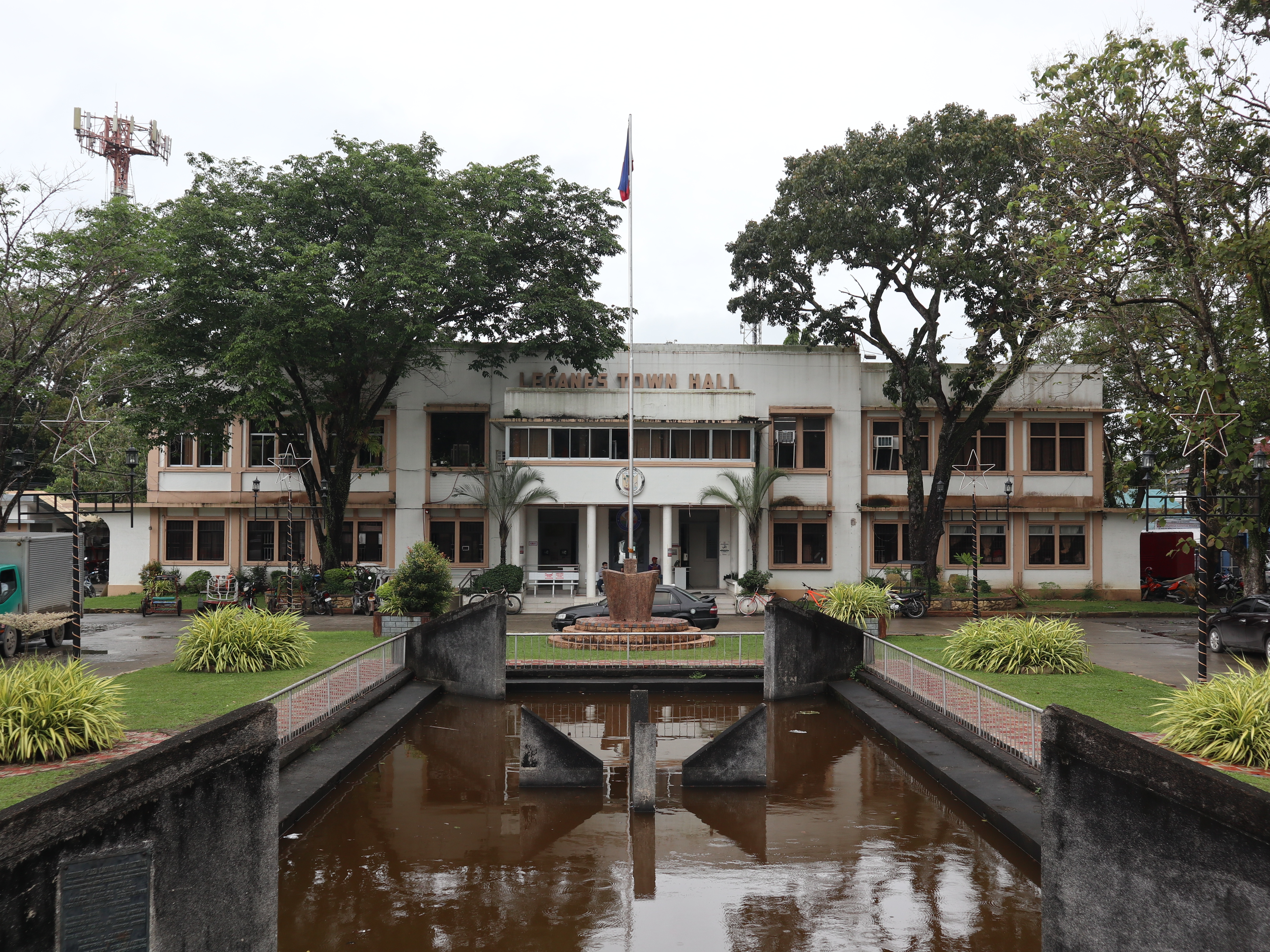
- Municipal Hall, 2023

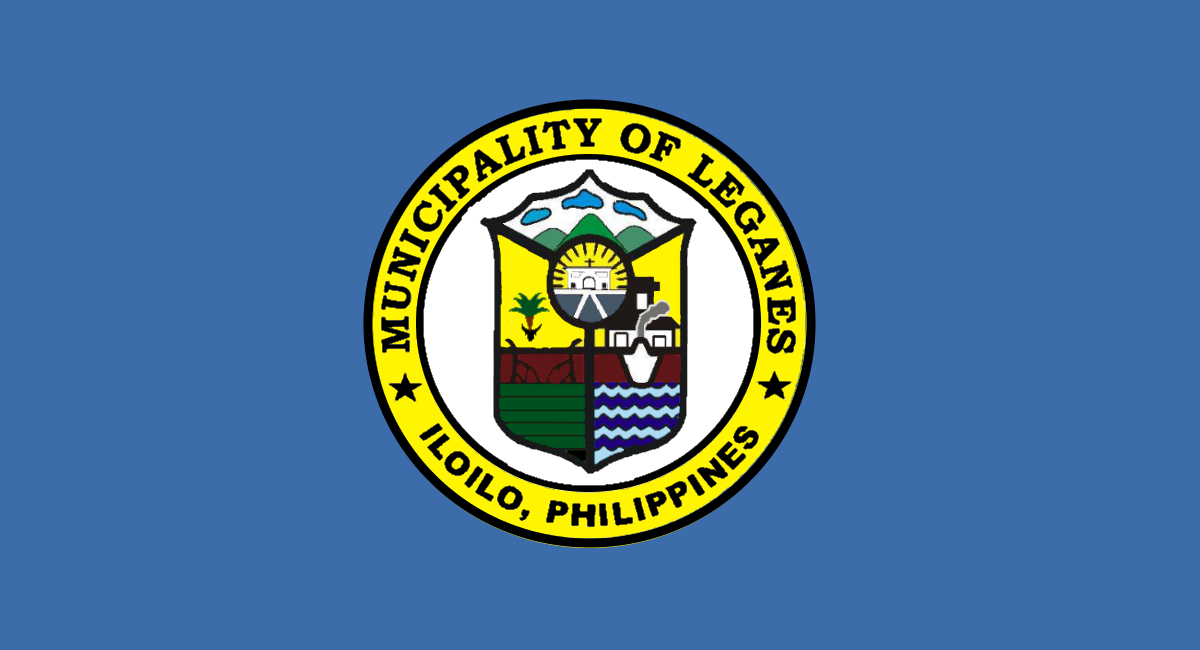
- Flag

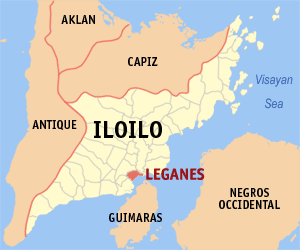
- Map of Iloilo with Leganes highlighted
- Interactive map of Leganes
- Location within the Philippines
- Coordinates: 10°47′N 122°35′E
- Country: Philippines
- Region: Western Visayas
- Province: Iloilo
- District: 2nd district
- Founded: 1584
- Chartered: 1858
- Barangays: 18 (see Barangays)

Government
  - Type: Sangguniang Bayan
  - Mayor: Vicente P. Jaen II (Nacionalista)
  - Vice Mayor: Lyle L. Bartolome (Nacionalista)
  - Representative: Kathryn Joyce F. Gorriceta (Lakas)
  - Municipal Council: Members: Theodore P. Banderado (Nacionalista); Adolfo D. Jaen, II (Nacionalista); Martin D. Jaen, III (Nacionalista); Joseph Allen D. Españo (Nacionalista); Rhea J. Jagunap (Nacionalista); Larry H. Labuson (Nacionalista); Niño Vincent J. Vallejo (Nacionalista); Abelardo T. Belmonte (Nacionalista); Paul Jay J. Krafft ^{‡}; Moses Oliver J. Bito-onon ^{◌}; ‡ ex officio ABC president; ◌ ex officio SK chairman
  - Electorate: 24,755 voters (2025)

Area
  - Total: 32.20 km^{2} (12.43 sq mi)
- Elevation: 6.0 m (19.7 ft)
- Highest elevation: 39 m (128 ft)
- Lowest elevation: −1 m (−3.3 ft)

Population (2024 census)
  - Total: 36,542
  - Density: 1,135/km^{2} (2,939/sq mi)
  - Households: 8,145

Economy
  - Income class: 2nd municipal income class
  - Poverty incidence: 9.83% (2023)
  - Revenue: ₱ 228.9 million (2024)
  - Assets: ₱ 678.7 million (2024)
  - Expenditure: ₱ 186.1 million (2024)
  - Liabilities: ₱ 153.3 million (2024)

Service provider
  - Electricity: Iloilo 1 Electric Cooperative (ILECO 1)
- Time zone: UTC+8 (PST)
- ZIP code: 5003
- PSGC: 063026000
- IDD : area code: +63 (0)33
- Native languages: Hiligaynon; Karay-a; Tagalog
- Website: www.uswag-leganes.gov.ph

Leganes, officially the Municipality of Leganes (Hiligaynon: Banwa sang Leganes, Tagalog: Bayan ng Leganes), is a municipality in the province of Iloilo, Philippines. According to the 2024 census, it has a population of 36,542 people.

It is located 11 kilometres (6.8 mi) north of the capital Iloilo City and is part of the Metro Iloilo–Guimaras area. Like most Philippine towns that sprawl outward from the capital, is made up of houses, farms and light agricultural industry. The major thoroughfare runs right through the center of the town.

== History ==
Leganes has a history closely intertwined with the neighboring town of Jaro. For many centuries, Leganes was considered an unremarkable area, primarily consisting of wetlands, marshes, and swamps. The upper part of the region was inhabited by wild animals, and it was known as Guihaman.

In 1903, through Act No. 719, Leganes was incorporated into the municipality of Santa Barbara. However, this arrangement was short-lived. In 1915, by virtue of Executive Order No. 97, Leganes was removed from Santa Barbara and merged with Jaro, effective from January 1, 1916.

Further changes occurred in 1939 when Executive Order No. 241 was issued on December 23. This order separated the "arrabal de Leganes" from the municipality of Jaro, establishing it as an independent municipality. This change officially took effect on January 1, 1940, marking the formation of the municipality of Leganes.

In 2024, Leganes was designated as one of the locations for light industries in the province. Restia Agro-Industrial Estate Park in Barangay Calabao, is the province's first agro-industrial economic zone, accredited by the Philippine Economic Zone Authority (PEZA).

== Geography ==
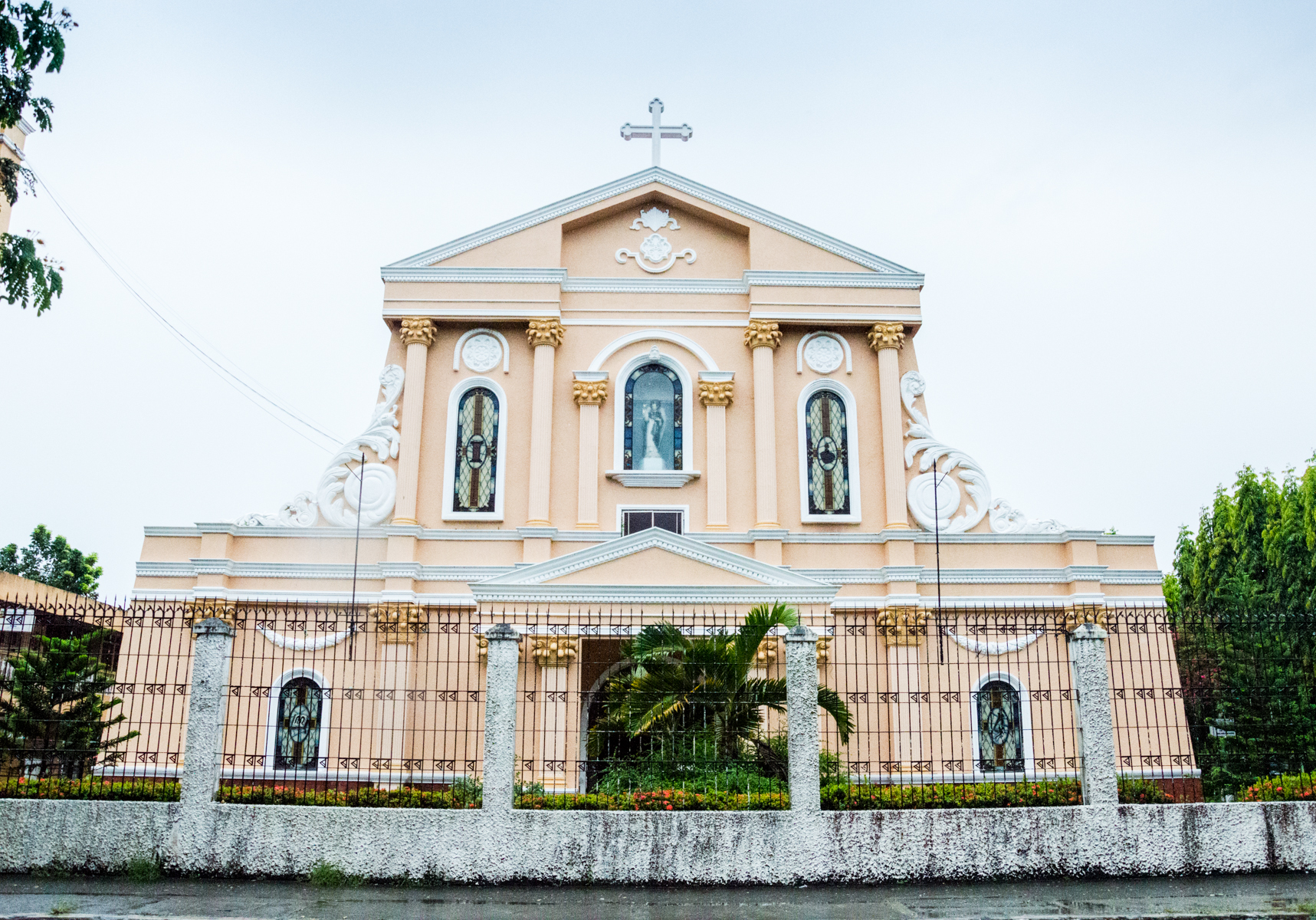
Facade of San Vicente Ferrer Church

It is located 11 kilometres (6.8 mi) north of the capital Iloilo City and was part of the Metro Iloilo–Guimaras area.

=== Barangays ===
Leganes is politically subdivided into 18 barangays. Each barangay consists of puroks and some have sitios.

- M.V. Hechanova (Balabago)
- Bigke
- Buntatala
- Cagamutan Norte
- Cagamutan Sur
- Calaboa
- Camangay
- Cari Mayor
- Cari Minor
- Gua-an
- Guihaman
- Guinobatan
- Guintas
- Lapayon
- Nabitasan
- Napnud
- Poblacion
- San Vicente

=== Climate ===
Climate data for Leganes, Iloilo
Month	Jan	Feb	Mar	Apr	May	Jun	Jul	Aug	Sep	Oct	Nov	Dec	Year
Mean daily maximum °C (°F)	30 (86)	31 (88)	32 (90)	33 (91)	32 (90)	30 (86)	29 (84)	29 (84)	29 (84)	29 (84)	30 (86)	30 (86)	30 (87)
Mean daily minimum °C (°F)	21 (70)	21 (70)	22 (72)	23 (73)	25 (77)	25 (77)	25 (77)	24 (75)	24 (75)	24 (75)	23 (73)	22 (72)	23 (74)
Average precipitation mm (inches)	19 (0.7)	17 (0.7)	26 (1.0)	37 (1.5)	119 (4.7)	191 (7.5)	258 (10.2)	260 (10.2)	248 (9.8)	196 (7.7)	97 (3.8)	39 (1.5)	1,507 (59.3)
Average rainy days	7.2	5.2	8.3	11.9	22.3	26.5	28.3	28.2	27.3	26.4	18.7	11.8	222.1
Source: Meteoblue

== Demographics ==
Population census of Leganes
Year	Pop.	±% p.a.
1903	3,827	—
1948	7,447	+1.49%
1960	9,244	+1.82%
1970	11,480	+2.19%
1975	12,328	+1.44%
1980	14,285	+2.99%
1990	18,505	+2.62%
1995	19,235	+0.73%
2000	23,475	+4.36%
2007	27,357	+2.13%
2010	29,438	+2.70%
2015	32,480	+1.89%
2020	34,725	+1.42%
2024	36,542	+1.23%
Source: Philippine Statistics Authority

In the 2024 census, the population of Leganes was 36,542 people, with a density of 1,100 inhabitants per square kilometre or 2,800 inhabitants per square mile.

=== Language ===
Hiligaynon is the most dominant dialect used by the residents. English and Tagalog are also spoken.

=== Religion ===
Roman Catholicism is the most dominant religion in this municipality.

== Economy ==
Poverty incidence of Leganes (%)

Source: Philippine Statistics Authority
