= Hagonoy, Bulacan =

Municipality in Bulacan, Philippines

Hagonoy
- Municipality
- Municipality of Hagonoy
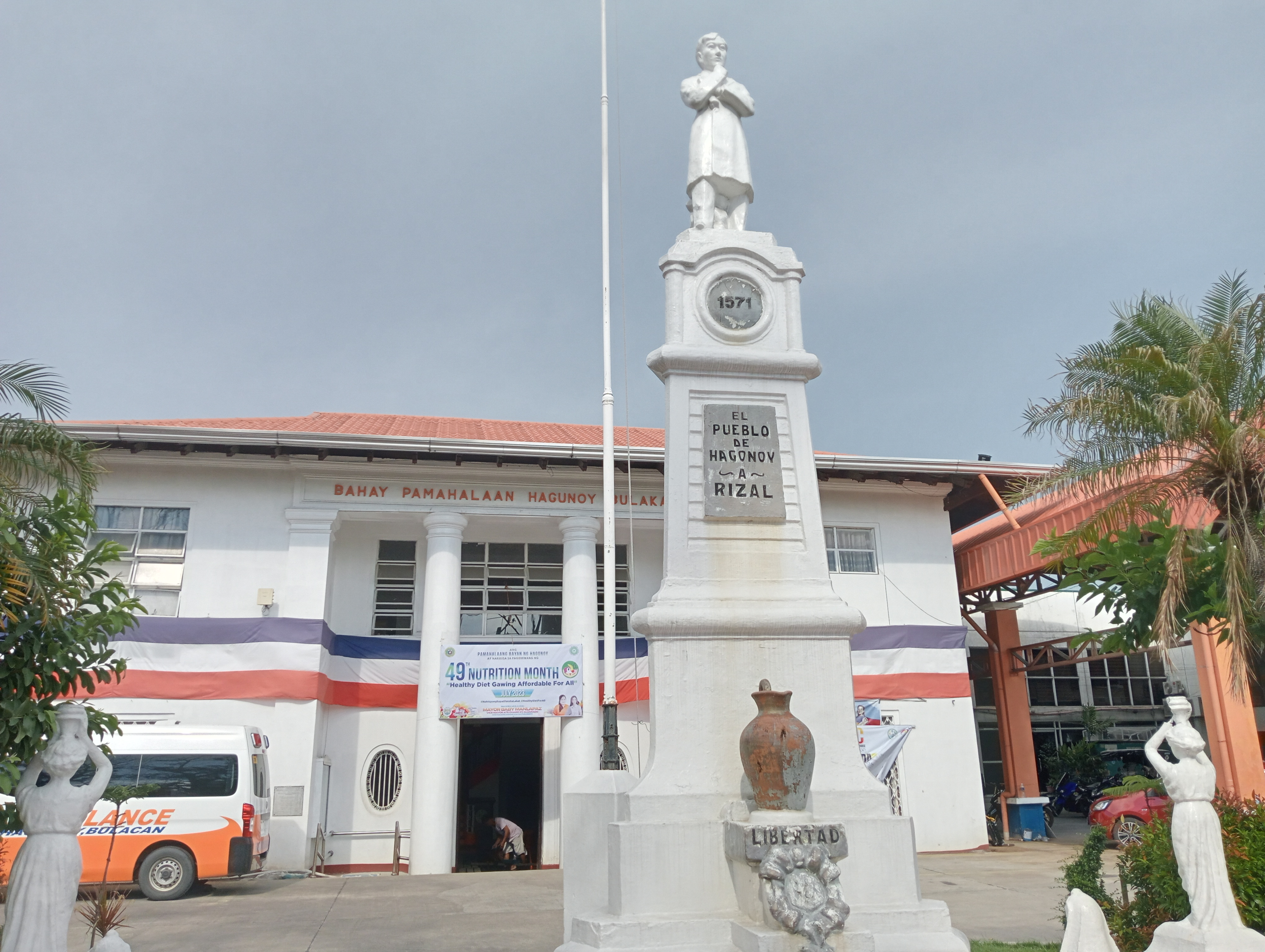
- Municipal Hall

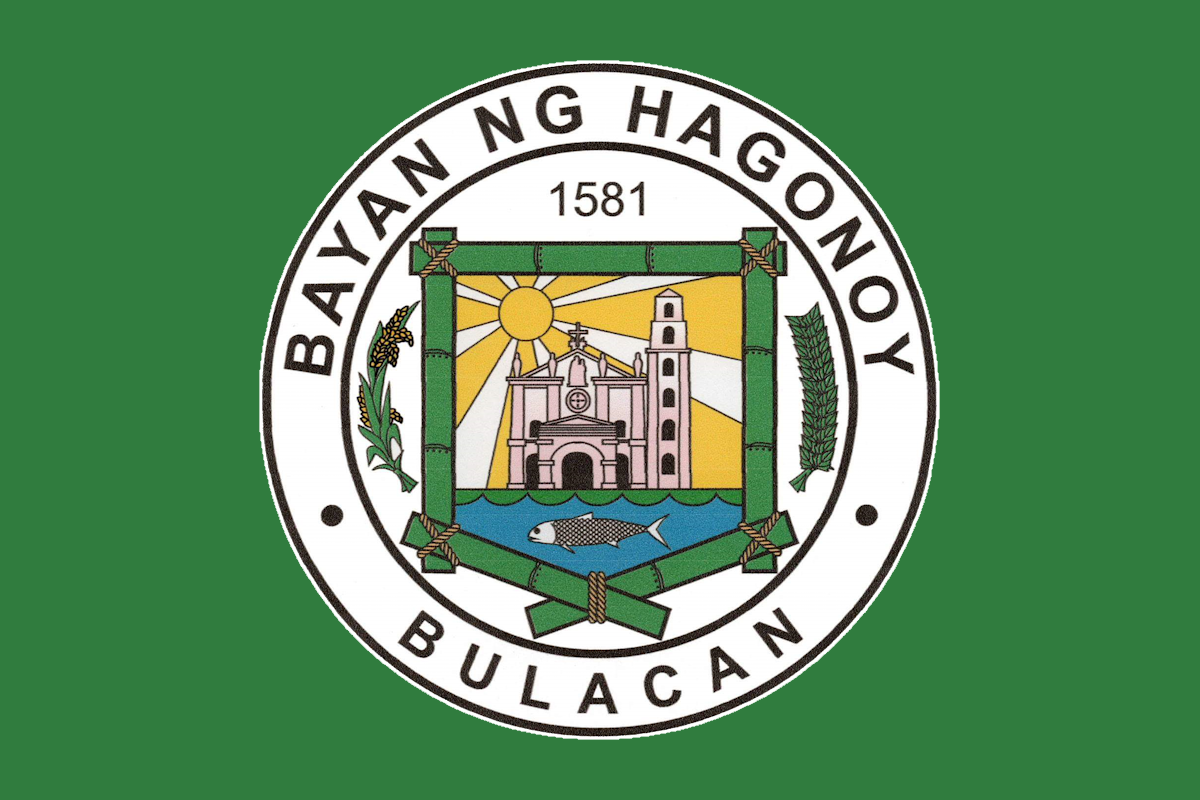
- Flag Seal
- Etymology: Chromolaena odorata
- Nicknames: Aquaculture Capital of Bulacan; Leviticus Town
- Motto(s): Ahon, Hagonoy! (Ascend, Hagonoy!)
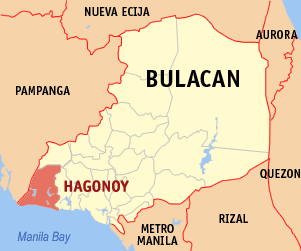
- Map of Bulacan with Hagonoy highlighted
- Interactive map of Hagonoy
- Location within the Philippines
- Coordinates: 14°50′N 120°44′E
- Country: Philippines
- Region: Central Luzon
- Province: Bulacan
- District: 1st district
- Founded: July 26, 1581
- Barangays: 26 (see Barangays)

Government
  - Type: Sangguniang Bayan
  - Mayor: Ma. Rosario "Ate Charo" Sy Alvarado-Mendoza
  - Vice Mayor: Jhane E. Dela Cruz
  - Representative: Danilo A. Domingo
  - Municipal Council: Members: Pedro S. Santos, Jr.; John David P. Martin; Glenn Harold C. Sarto; Dalisay V. Ople-San Jose; Elmer S. Santos; Michael Darwin M. Cruz; Edison S. Tanjuan; Carlo DJ. Cudia
  - Electorate: 80,335 voters (2025)

Area
  - Total: 103.10 km^{2} (39.81 sq mi)
- Elevation: 5.0 m (16.4 ft)
- Highest elevation: 43 m (141 ft)
- Lowest elevation: −4 m (−13 ft)

Population (2024 census)
  - Total: 136,673
  - Density: 1,325.6/km^{2} (3,433.4/sq mi)
  - Households: 33,922
- Demonym: Hagonoeño

Economy
  - Income class: 1st municipal income class
  - Poverty incidence: 11.72% (2023)
  - Revenue: ₱ 478.1 million (2024)
  - Assets: ₱ 1,197 million (2024)
  - Expenditure: ₱ 438.2 million (2024)
  - Liabilities: ₱ 283.2 million (2024)

Utilties
  - Electricity: Meralco
  - Water Supply: Hagonoy Water District
- Time zone: UTC+8 (PST)
- ZIP code: 3002
- PSGC: 0301409000
- IDD : area code: +63 (0)44
- Native languages: Tagalog; Kapampangan
- Catholic diocese: Diocese of Malolos
- Patron saint: Saint Anne
- Website: elgu-hagonoy-bulacan.e.gov.ph

Hagonoy ([hɐˈɡunoɪ] or [hɐˈɡonoɪ]), officially the Municipality of Hagonoy (Tagalog: Bayan ng Hagonoy, Kapampangan: Balen ning Hagonoy), is a municipality in the province of Bulacan, Philippines. According to the 2024 census, it has a population of 136,673 people.

== Etymology ==
The town was named after the "hagunoy" (Chromolaena odorata), a medicinal plant that used to be abundant in its river banks and along the seashores. The original populace used its leaves as their herbal remedy of choice for common illnesses and as food ingredients. Because of the medicinal value of the plant, the news of its effectiveness spread leading the people to call the place "Hagonoy".

=== Hagonoy's town legend ===
In the 16th century, some friars took a boat from Manila to the province of Bulacan and reached what was then called "Quinabaloan" (from Kapampangan word kinabaluan meaning "had been known" or "pinag-alaman" in Tagalog—which was then still part of the town of Calumpit and is now the barangays of Santa Monica and San Jose). At that time, a very charming lass was so popular among the young men of the locality. She had many suitors and admirers. One day, she felt ill and she needed someone to get leaves of the hagonoy plant by the river (which is now called Sapang Pari because the friars and priests used this river to commute).

A man offered to promptly get some leaves of the plant and in deep gratitude, she promised to marry him. As he was gathering the leaves of the hagunoy plant for his dearly beloved, the group of friars in a passing boat stopped to ask him, "Quien vive?" (Where are we?). The man did not understand Spanish and was extremely intimidated by the guardia civil (Spanish civil guard) that escorted the friars. Thinking that they were asking what he was grasping in his hands, he quickly retorted "Hagunoy po!" (Hagunoy, sir!) and scampered away.

These were the first Augustinian friars that got into town and they noted the place's name as "Hagonoy". Hence, the origin of the illustrious town's name.

== History ==
Hagonoy was first mentioned in the history of the Philippines in 1571. Even before the "blood compact" between the Spain's conqueror Miguel Lopez de Legazpi and the Philippines' Datu Sikatuna was made, the place was already known as Hagonoy. The land consists of archipelagic marsh and river tributaries going to the sea, where the first ancestors of this town probably took this way to reach Hagonoy.

Hagonoy first appeared in Philippine history when they formed part of the fleet of Tarik Sulayman of Macabebe, Pampanga that met Martin de Goiti at the Battle of Bangkusay in the initial defense of the Lusong against the Spaniards in 1571.

Hagonoy began as part of Alcaldia de Calumpit as its visita together with Apalit. It has huge convent having founded on April 22, 1581, with Fray Diego Ordonez de Vivar as its first minister according to Gaspar's "Conquistas delas Islas" Book 2 (Fray Diego having credited for the christiniazation of Calumpit, Malolos and Bulakan). At first, it was also included in the territorial part of Encomienda de Calumpit that was given by Governor General Gonzalo Ronquillo to Sargento Juan de Moron for his good service and loyalty to Spanish Crown. Sargento Juan Moron once trusted his land to the Augustinian friars, and that's how it was handed to Fray Diego Vivar.

It is also noted that primary source documents, such as Miguel de Loarca's "Relacion delas Islas" written in 1582 and Luis Perez de Dasmarinas report on King of Spain in June 1591, do not mention Hagonoy as an independent encomienda or town. Instead it is simultaneously with the much older town of Calumpit and it was officially established as a civil town in May 1671. According to records and old folks, there were already inhabitants in some places of this settlement.These places were Tibaguin and Pugad, coastal barrios sharing the coastline with the City of Malolos and towns of Bulakan, Obando and the City of Manila.

Magat Salamat, a revolutionary hero, and the last Prince of Tondo, once headed this town. He was the ancestor of the Salamat families now living in different barrios of this town.

By August 2026, several parts of Hagonoy were submerged for more than two weeks due to severe flooding, largely due to several typhoons and monsoon rains passing through the area. The residents blamed the incomplete flood control projects as a reason for the flooding.

== Geography ==
With a total land area of 103.10 square kilometers, Hagonoy is situated at the south-west corner of the province of Bulacan. It is bounded by the municipality of Calumpit on the north, municipality of Paombong on the east, municipality of Masantol, Pampanga on the west and Manila Bay on the south. The municipality is approximately 54 kilometers from Metro Manila or about an hour and a half drive. It can be accessed via North Luzon Expressway and MacArthur Highway.

Hagonoy is a long ridge with a lake on its edge by Manila Bay called "Wawa", which is now part of Barangays San Sebastian and San Nicolas. It is basically a fishing town with Manila Bay as its proximate fishing ground, which extends up to the provinces of Pampanga, Bataan, and Cavite. Its more adventurous fisherfolk brave the waves of the South China Sea northward and cross into the Philippine Sea in the Pacific Ocean on the eastern seaboard where they cast their nets and haul their catch to the fishing ports of Quezon province.

=== Barangays ===
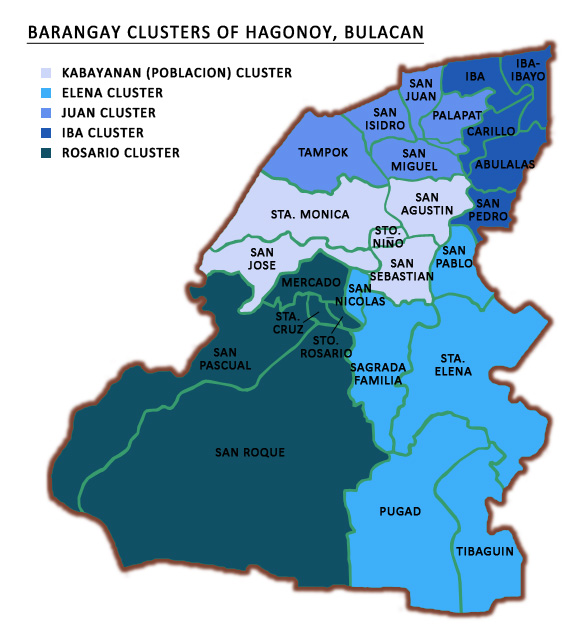
Barangay clusters of Hagonoy

Hagonoy is politically subdivided into 26 barangays - as shown in the matrix below - grouped into 5 clusters or kumpol for statistical purposes. All barangays are classified as urban by the Philippine Statistics Authority. Each barangay consists of puroks and some have sitios.

PSGC	Barangay	Population			±% p.a.	
		2024		2010		
031409001	Abulalas	3.9%	5,283	4,878	▴	0.55%
031409002	Carillo	1.2%	1,708	1,681	▴	0.11%
031409003	Iba	3.9%	5,321	4,891	▴	0.58%
031409004	Mercado	5.2%	7,114	6,851	▴	0.26%
031409005	Palapat	1.7%	2,364	2,393	▾	−0.08%
031409006	Pugad	1.4%	1,907	1,723	▴	0.70%
031409007	Sagrada Familia	4.8%	6,569	6,794	▾	−0.23%
031409008	San Agustin	7.6%	10,336	10,291	▴	0.03%
031409009	San Isidro	5.9%	8,102	7,314	▴	0.71%
031409011	San Jose	3.4%	4,646	5,123	▾	−0.67%
031409012	San Juan	2.6%	3,542	3,175	▴	0.76%
031409013	San Miguel	4.3%	5,888	5,767	▴	0.14%
031409014	San Nicolas	3.7%	5,113	5,012	▴	0.14%
031409015	San Pablo	2.4%	3,346	2,894	▴	1.01%
031409016	San Pascual	4.4%	5,957	6,253	▾	−0.33%
031409017	San Pedro	3.7%	5,042	4,090	▴	1.46%
031409018	San Roque	3.6%	4,908	4,676	▴	0.34%
031409019	San Sebastian	6.0%	8,193	8,069	▴	0.11%
031409020	Santa Cruz	2.5%	3,484	3,698	▾	−0.41%
031409021	Santa Elena	3.6%	4,918	4,650	▴	0.39%
031409022	Santa Monica	6.1%	8,317	8,683	▾	−0.30%
031409023	Santo Niño (Poblacion)	3.2%	4,415	3,859	▴	0.94%
031409024	Santo Rosario	3.8%	5,251	5,438	▾	−0.24%
031409025	Tampok	1.9%	2,635	2,788	▾	−0.39%
031409026	Tibaguin	2.1%	2,884	2,363	▴	1.39%
031409027	Iba‑Ibayo	1.9%	2,564	2,335	▴	0.65%
	Total		136,673	125,689	▴	0.58%

==== Change of barangay names ====
Some barangays had a different name than it does now. Their names derived from events, legends, things or the condition of the place (indicated in the parentheses) as follows:

- Sagrada Familia (Malayak)
- San Agustin (Bantayan)
- San Juan (Burayag)
- San Nicolas (Bangos)
- San Pascual (Dita)
- San Roque (Bagong Baryo)
- San Sebastian (Wawa)
- Santa Elena (Marulaw)
- Santo Rosario (Tangos)

=== Climate ===
Climate data for Hagonoy, Bulacan
Month	Jan	Feb	Mar	Apr	May	Jun	Jul	Aug	Sep	Oct	Nov	Dec	Year
Mean daily maximum °C (°F)	28 (82)	29 (84)	31 (88)	33 (91)	32 (90)	31 (88)	30 (86)	29 (84)	29 (84)	30 (86)	30 (86)	28 (82)	30 (86)
Mean daily minimum °C (°F)	20 (68)	20 (68)	21 (70)	22 (72)	24 (75)	24 (75)	24 (75)	24 (75)	24 (75)	23 (73)	22 (72)	21 (70)	22 (72)
Average precipitation mm (inches)	6 (0.2)	4 (0.2)	6 (0.2)	17 (0.7)	82 (3.2)	122 (4.8)	151 (5.9)	123 (4.8)	124 (4.9)	99 (3.9)	37 (1.5)	21 (0.8)	792 (31.1)
Average rainy days	3.3	2.5	11.7	6.6	17.7	22.2	25.2	23.7	23.2	17.9	9.2	5.2	168.4
Source: Meteoblue

== Demographics ==
Population census of Hagonoy
Year	Pop.	±% p.a.
1903	21,304	—
1918	22,490	+0.36%
1939	29,734	+1.34%
1948	37,532	+2.62%
1960	46,861	+1.87%
1970	59,889	+2.48%
1975	65,592	+1.84%
1980	73,176	+2.21%
1990	90,212	+2.12%
1995	99,423	+1.84%
2000	111,425	+2.47%
2007	124,748	+1.57%
2010	125,689	+0.27%
2015	129,807	+0.62%
2020	133,448	+0.58%
2024	136,673	+0.57%
Source: Philippine Statistics Authority

In the 2020 census, the population of Hagonoy, Bulacan was 133,448 people, with a density of 1,300 inhabitants per square kilometre or 3,400 inhabitants per square mile.

== Economy ==
Poverty incidence of Hagonoy (%)

Source: Philippine Statistics Authority

According to the Commission on Audit (COA) 2010 Annual Financial Report, Hagonoy ranked as the 8th richest municipality in Bulacan, surpassing the annual income of other municipalities like Bocaue, Calumpit, Plaridel, San Ildefonso and Balagtas.

=== Trade and commerce ===
Trade and commerce in Hagonoy is concentrated at the town center where the public market, municipal hall, church, schools, hospital, clinics, and commercial spaces are situated. Major business activities include drugstores, banks, financial institutions, private consignacions, restaurants/food shops, groceries, and construction supplies.

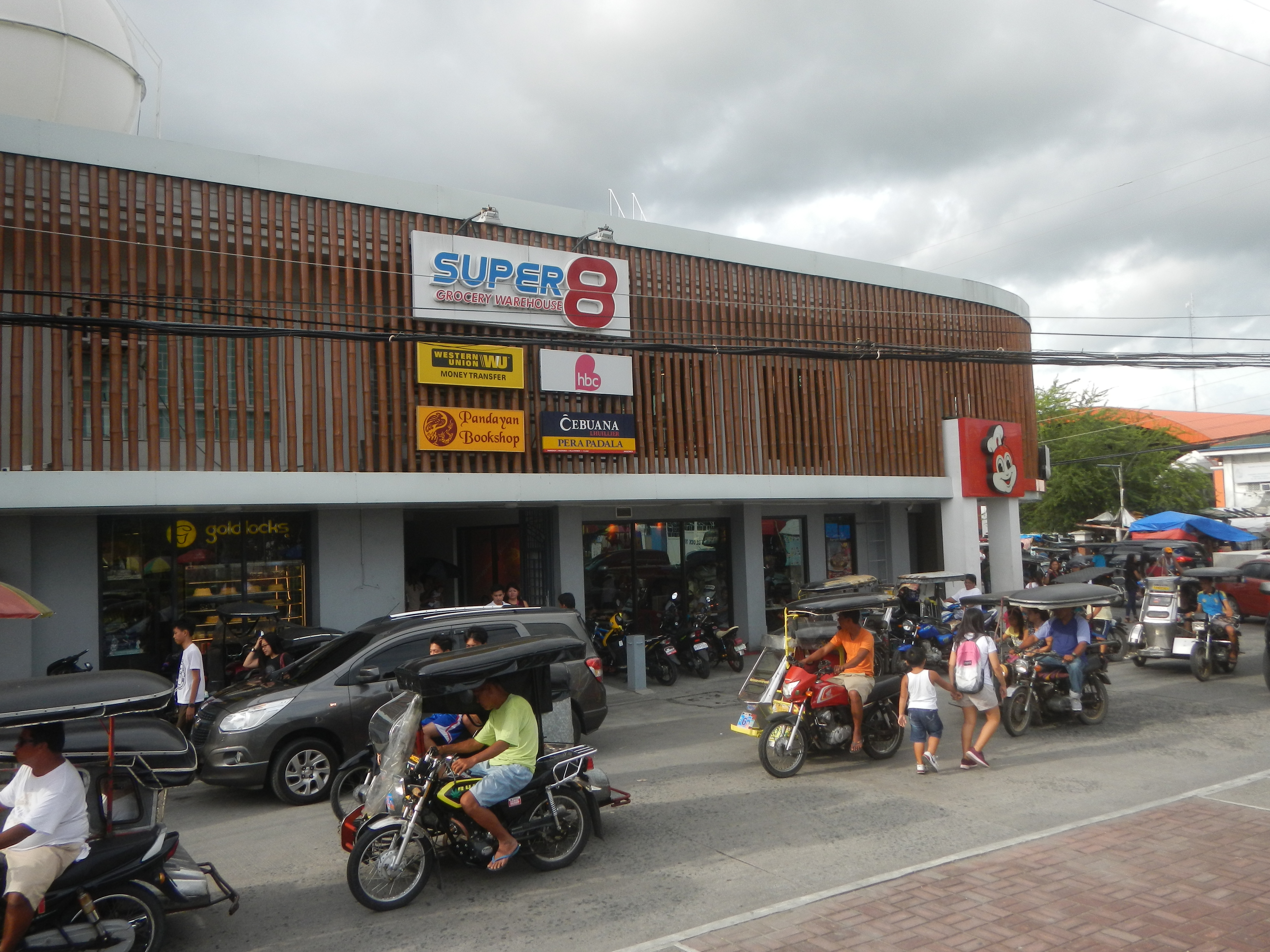
Façade of Super 8 Grocery Warehouse Hagonoy

Major Industries

- Aquaculture
- Agriculture
- Flowers/Ornamental Plants
- Food Processing
- Furniture
- Garments
- Gifts/Houseware/Decors
- Metalcraft

Major Products

- Prawns, Milkfish, other Fishes and Crustaceans
- Processed Food (bagoong alamang)
- Processed Meat
- Garments and Apparel
- Toys and Giftware

Indigenous and raw materials

- Bamboo and Sasa (Nipa) leaves

== Government ==
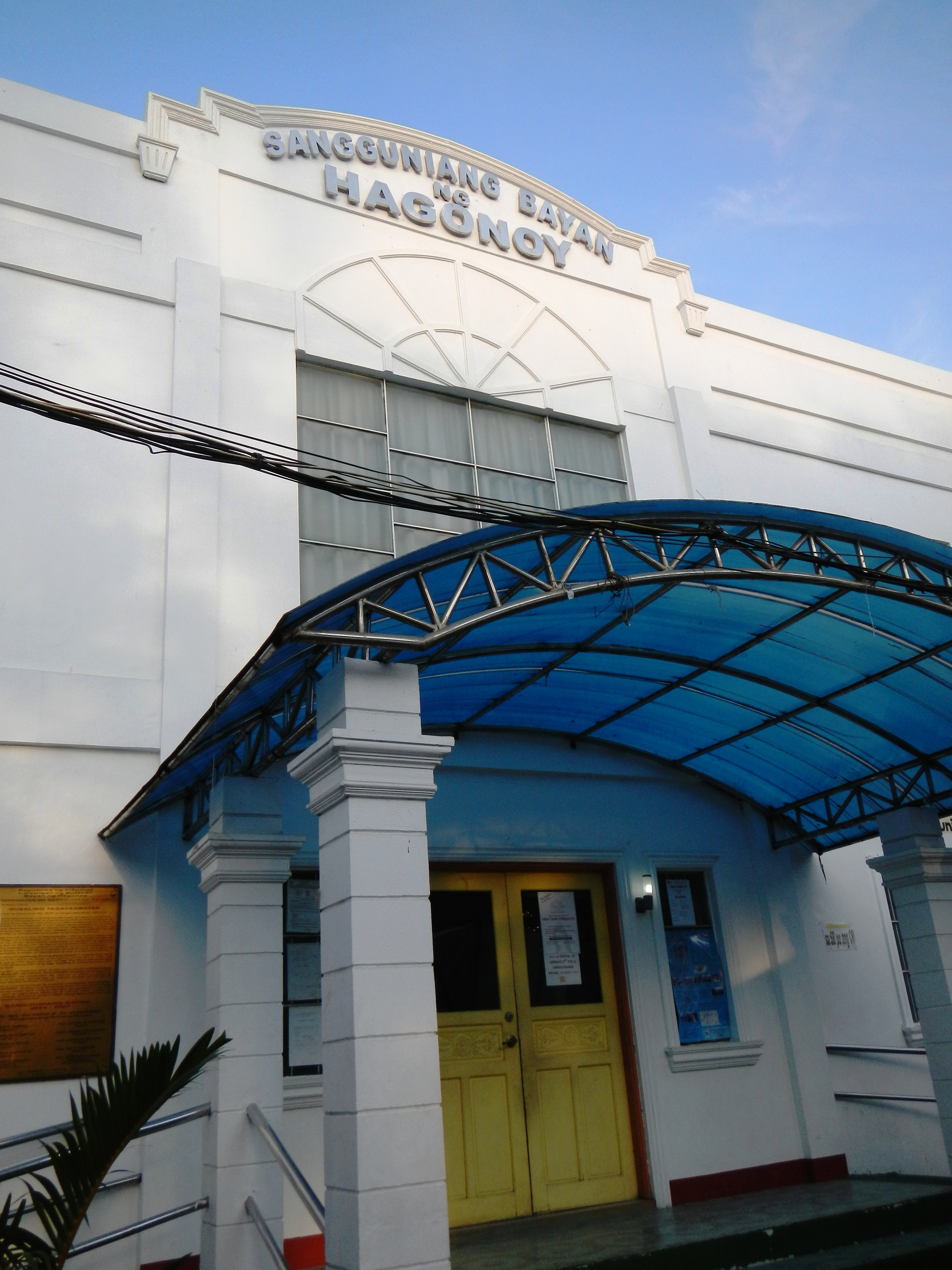
Sangguniang Bayan of Hagonoy Building

=== Elected officials ===
The following officials were elected in the Philippine Elections on May 10, 2025, to serve a three-year term.

- Mayor: Ma. Rosario "Ate Charo" Sy-Alvarado Mendoza (Lakas-CMD)
- Vice Mayor: Jhane Dela Cruz (PFP)

Councilors

- Teton Tanjuan(NPC)
- Carlo Caudia. (PFP)
- Sir Juan Martin (Lakas-CMD)
- Elmer S. Santos (PFP)
- Dalisay "Baby" V. Ople (Lakas-CMD)
- Glenn Sarto (Lakas-CMD)
- Michael Darwin M. Cruz (Lakas-CMD)
- Pedro "KAP" Santos (Lakas-CMD)

=== List of mayors ===
- Don Francisco L. Sebastian (first mayor)
- Ramona S. Trillana
- Emilio G. Perez (1963–1972)
- Hermogenes B. Perez (1972–1986)
- Wilhelmino M. Sy-Alvarado (1987–1998)
- Felix V. Ople (1998–2007)
- Angel L. Cruz Jr. (2007–2013)
- Raulito "Amboy" T. Manlapaz Sr. (2013–2022)
- Flordeliza "Baby" C. Manlapaz. (2022-2025)

=== List of vice mayors ===
- Nestor S. Santos (1963–1967)
- Maria Garcia (1967–1972)
- Eleazer F. Laderas (1988–1995)
- Maria G. Santos (1995–1998)
- Josefina Contreras (2001–2004)
- Marivic R. Sy-Alvarado (2004–2007)
- Elmer Santos (2007–2010)
- Reynaldo O. Santos (2010–2013)
- Pedro S. Santos Jr. (2013–2019)
- Angel L. Cruz Jr. (2019–2022)
- Ma. Rosario "Ate Charo" Sy-Alvarado Mendoza. (2022-2025)

== Religion ==
=== National Shrine and Parish of St. Anne in the Philippines ===
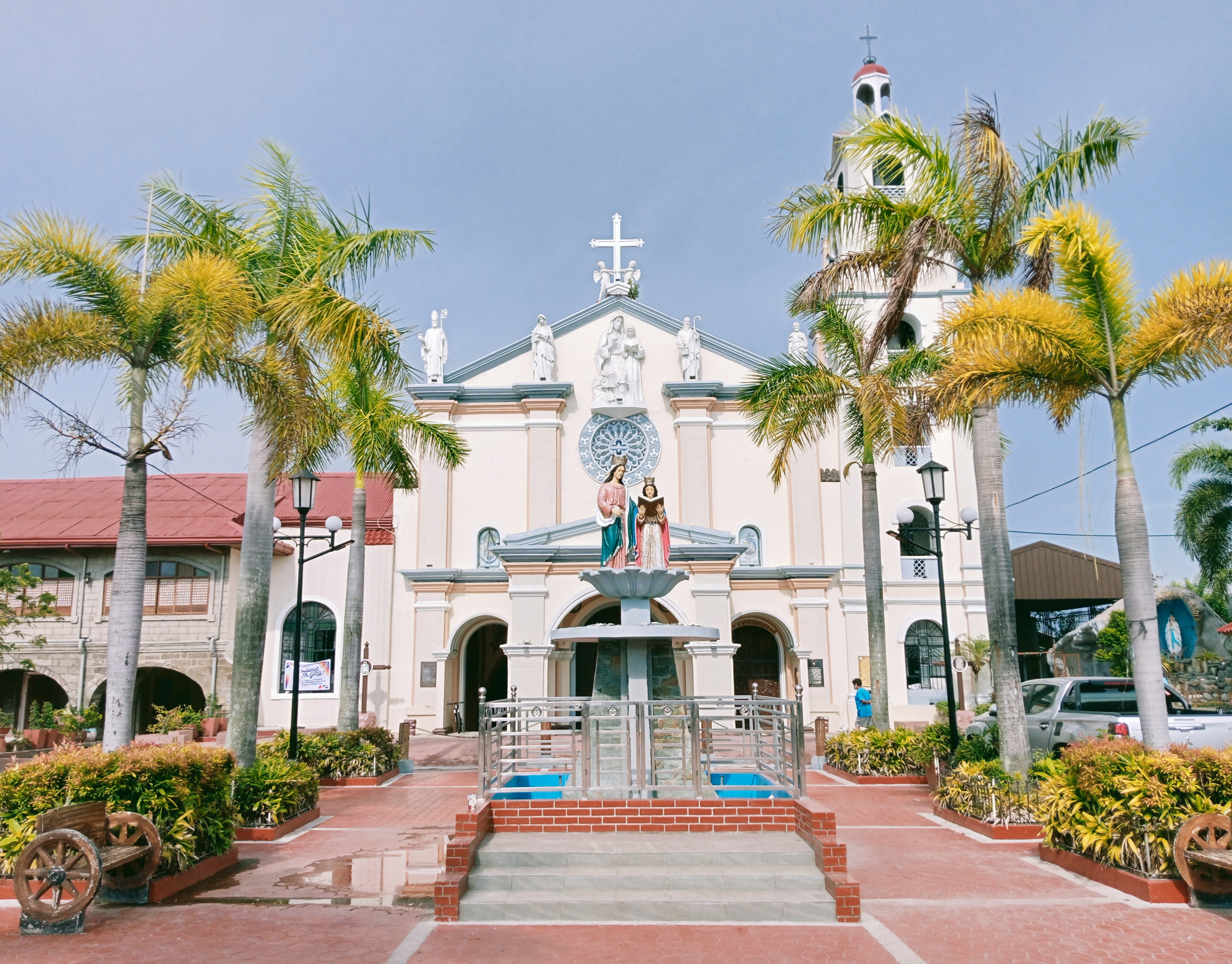
Façade of the National Shrine of St. Anne

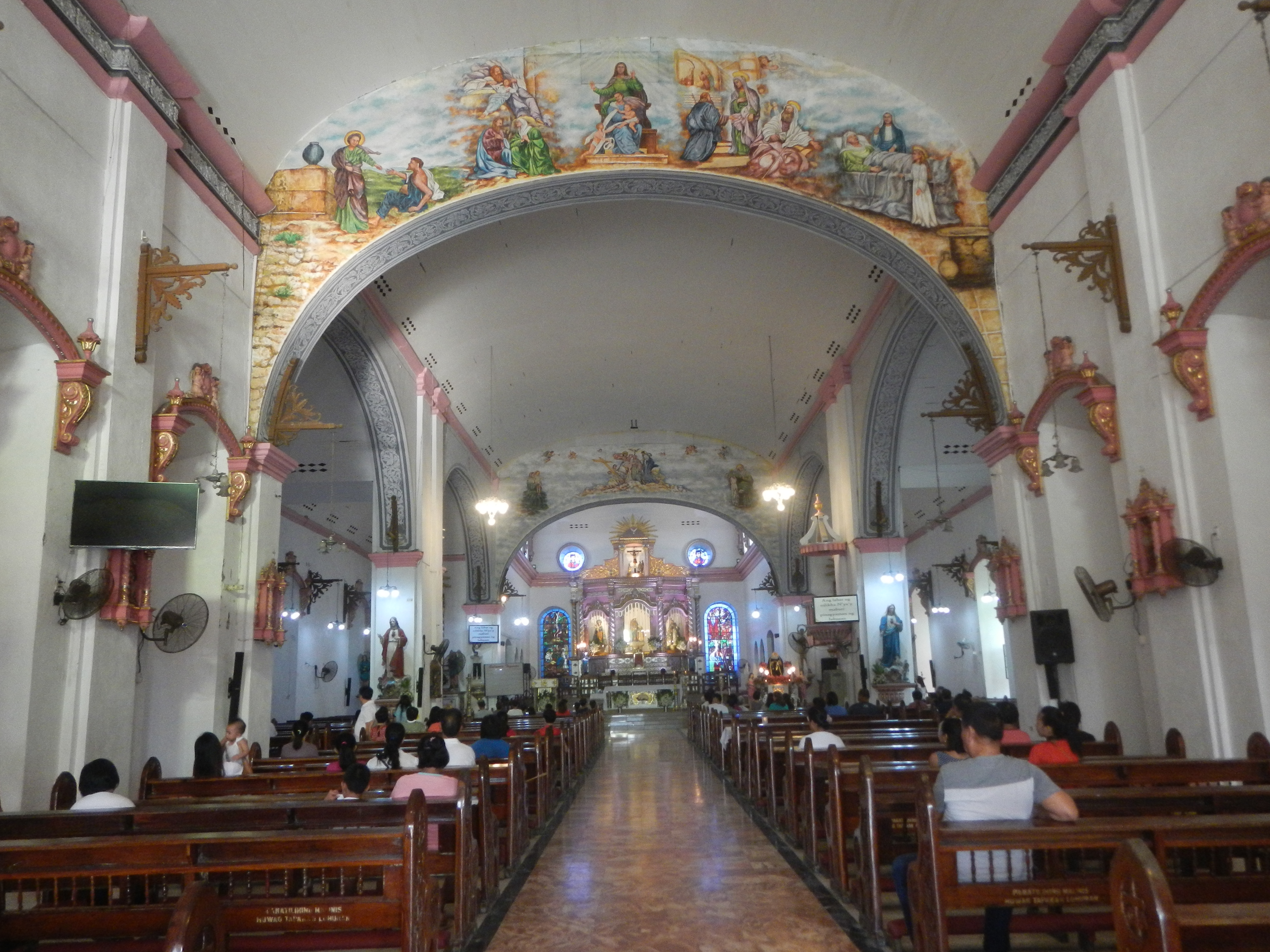
Interior of the National Shrine of St. Anne

Hagonoy is deeply religious, in the town centre is the native's principal Church. The National Shrine of Saint Anne was originally a visita under the parish of Calumpit. It became a town church in 1731 with Fr. Juan Albarran, OSA, as its first curate. It was rebuilt in 1871 by Fr. Ignacio Manzanares, OSA. The church was taken over by the Filipino clergy in 1896 with Fr. Clemente Garcia as the first Filipino curate. He was succeeded by Dr. Mariano Sevilla from 1902 to 1922, Fr. Exequiel Morales, 1922–1936. Fr. Celestino Rodriguez OFM, curate since 1936 and improved the church. It was made into a national shrine to honor St. Anne, the mother of the Blessed Virgin Mary. This church holds the relics of St. Anne from the Basilica of Sainte-Anne-de-Beaupré, the international shrine in Quebec, Canada and also the relics of St. Joachim, the husband of St. Anne. It is composed of the sub-parish churches of San Agustin, San Jose, Santa Monica, San Nicolas, Santo Niño, San Sebastian, and Sitio Parong-Parong of Barangay San Agustin.

=== St. John the Baptist Parish Church ===
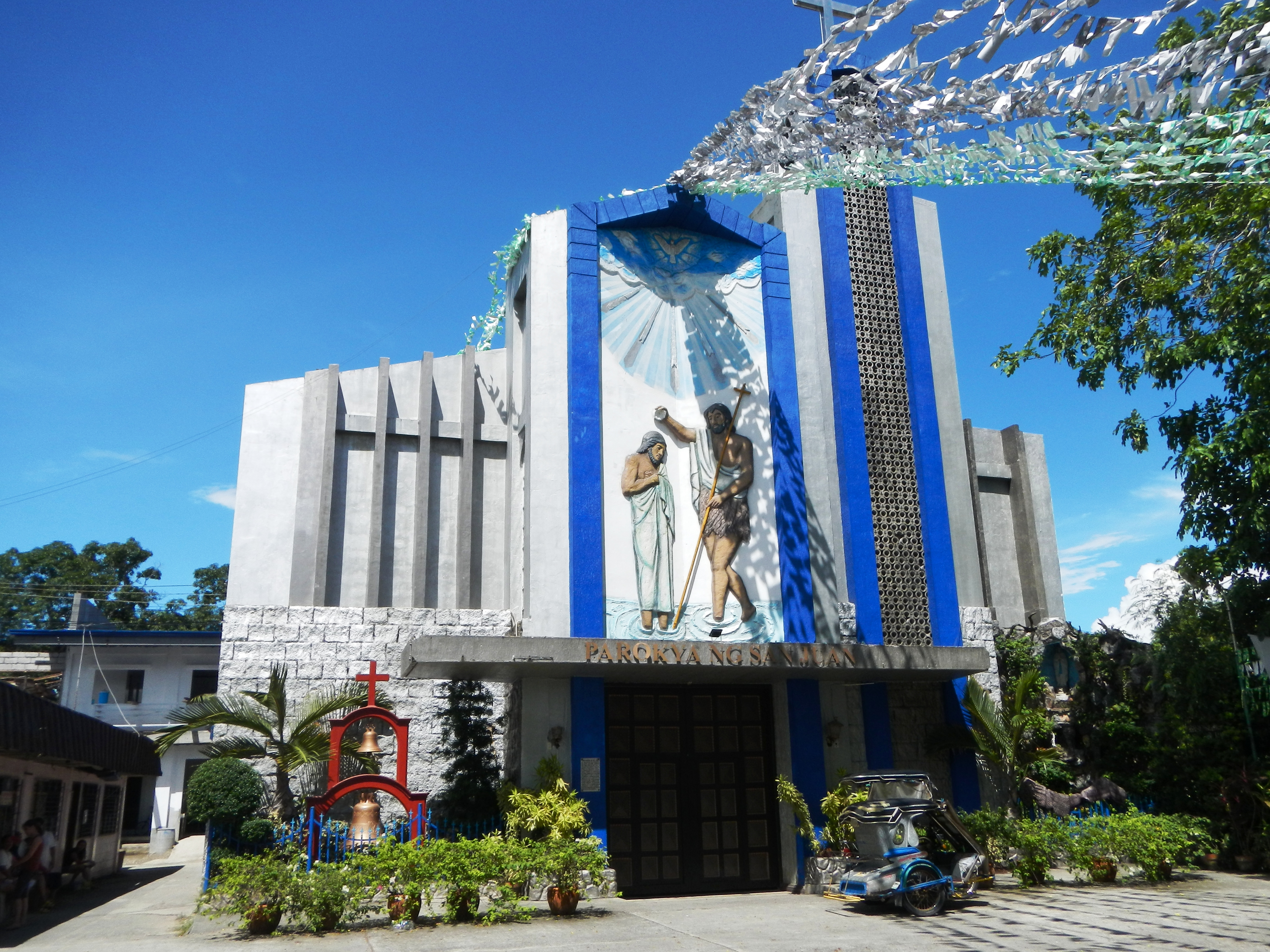
Façade of St. John the Baptist Parish Church

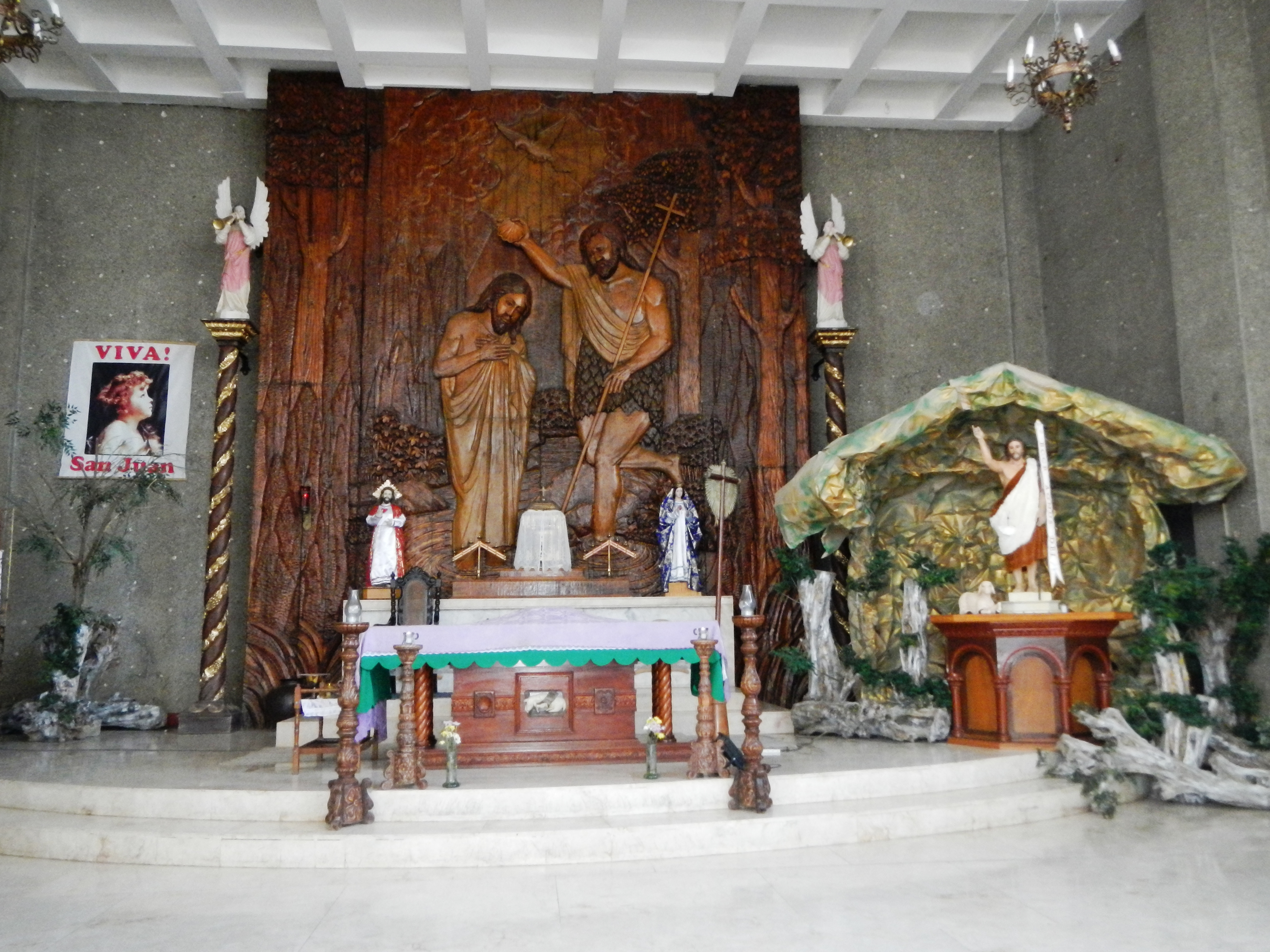
Interior of St. John the Baptist Parish Church

Situated in Barangay San Juan, and is composed by the barangays of San Juan, Tampok, San Isidro, and San Miguel. Inaugurated on March 23, 1948, through Bishop Miguel O'Doherty of Archdiocese of Manila. Fr. Elias Reyes served as its first curate. The church was step by step reconstructed in the curation of Fr. Jose Ingco, Fr. Serafin Riedo de Dios, Fr. Antonio Borlongan, and Fr. Generoso Jimenez with the cooperation of Bishop Rufino J. Santos and the good people of the community.

=== St. Helena Parish Church ===
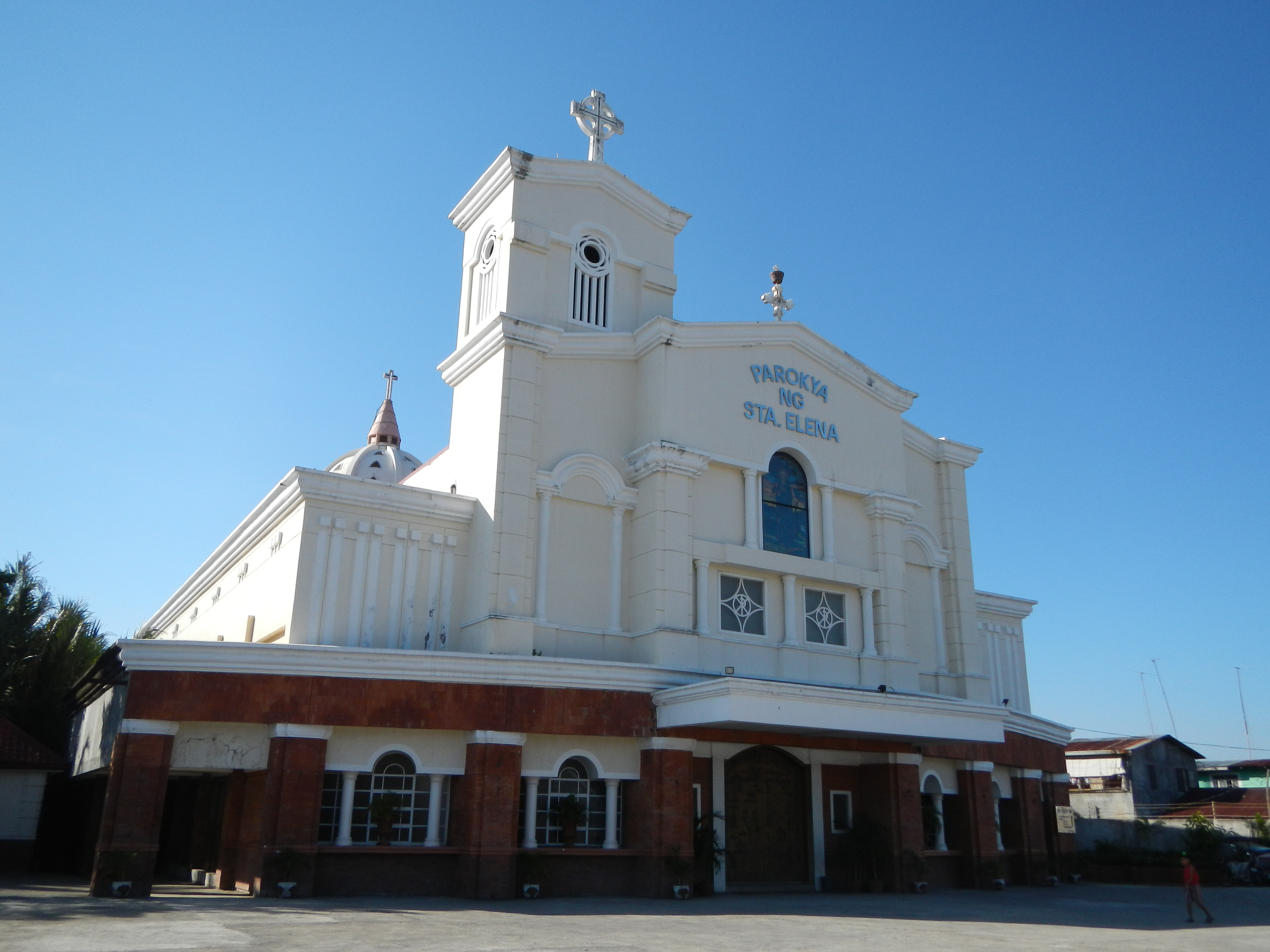
Façade of the Parish Church of St. Helena

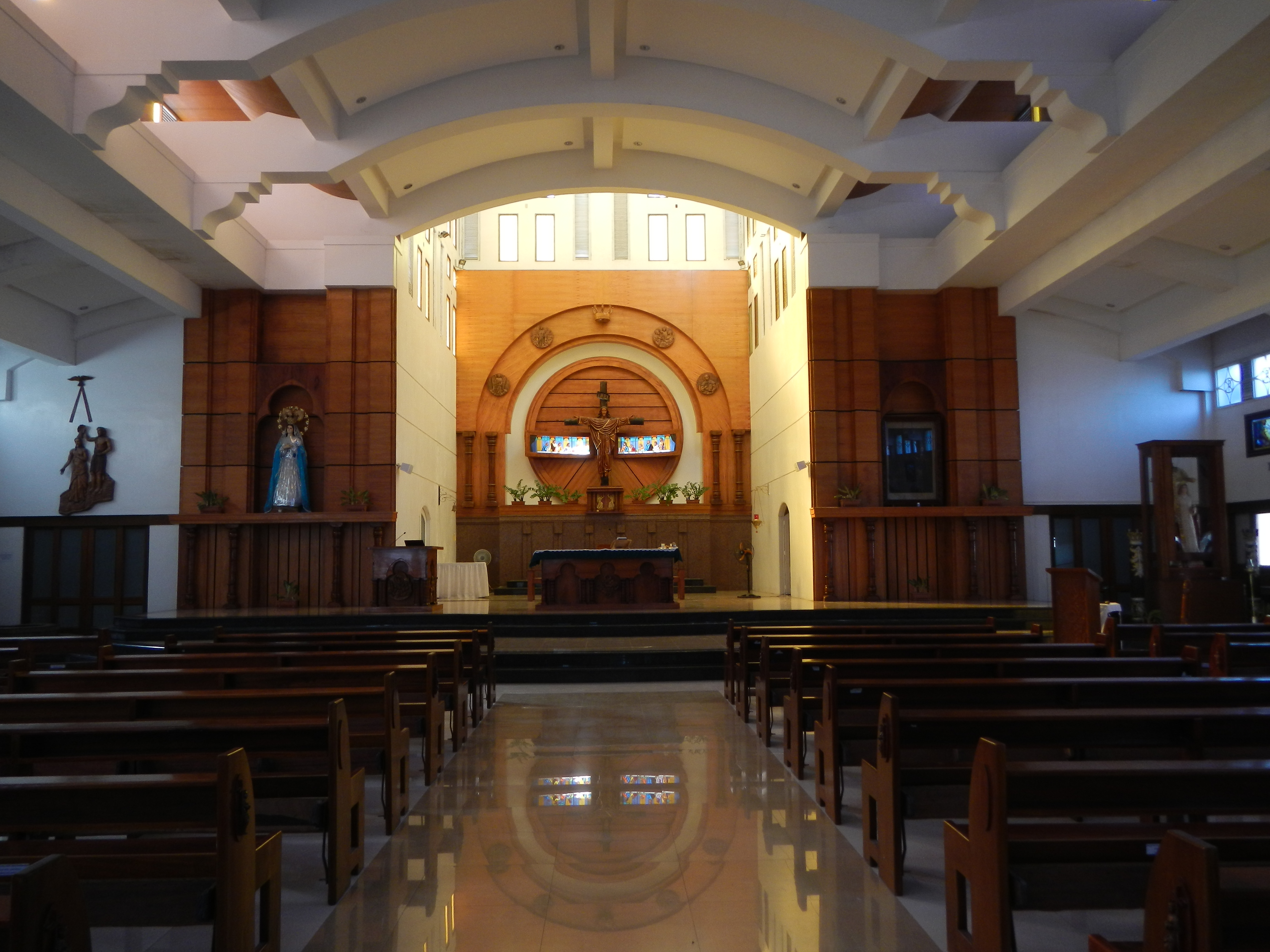
Interior of St. Helena Parish Church

The church became a parish on January 11, 1941, under the curation of its first curator Rev. Fr. Melchor A. Barcelona. It is composed of the sub-parish churches of Sagrada Familia, Sitio Buga, Sitio Tangos, Pugad and Tibaguin.

=== Saint Anthony of Padua Parish Church ===
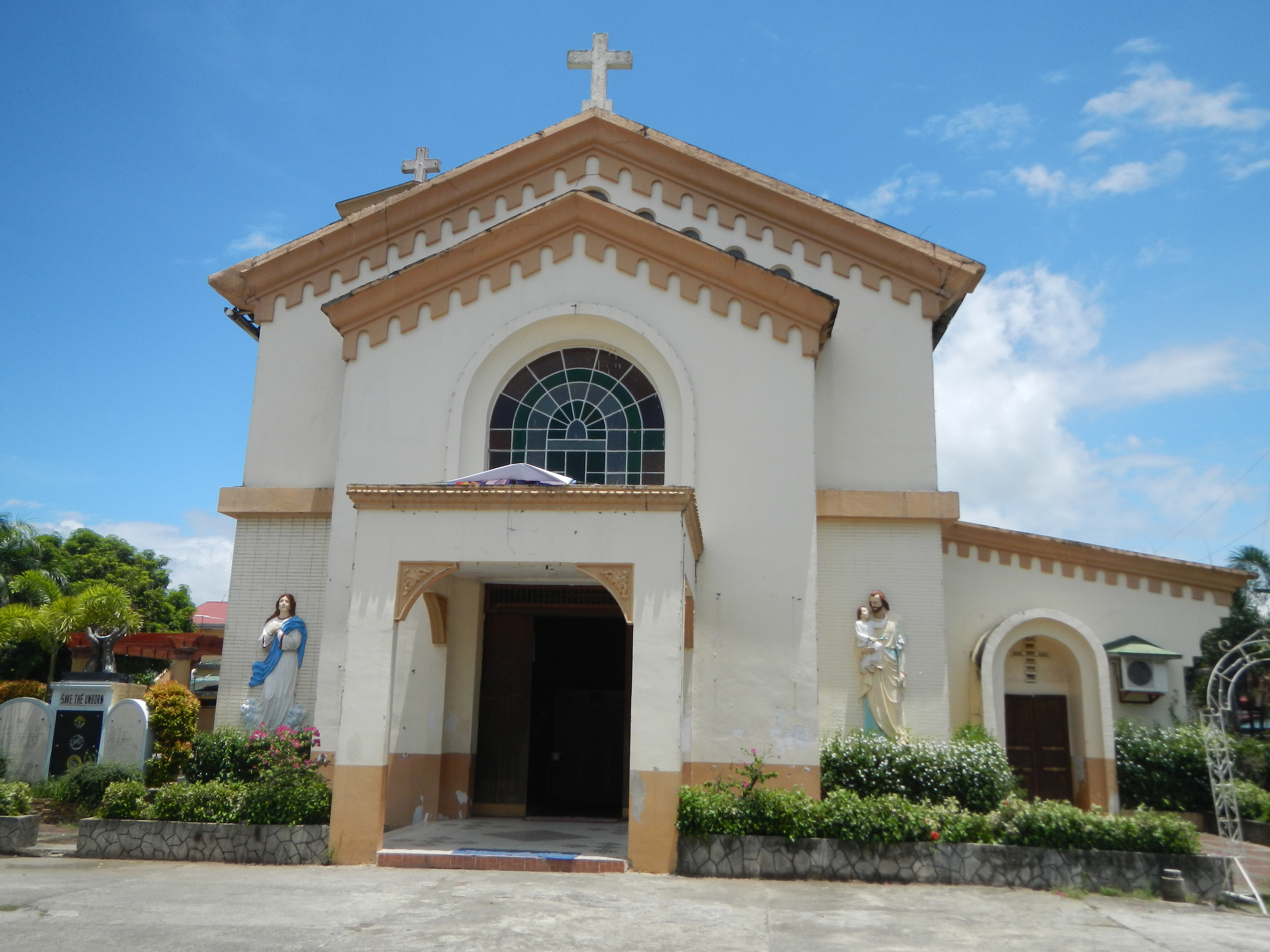
Façade of St. Anthony of Padua Parish Church

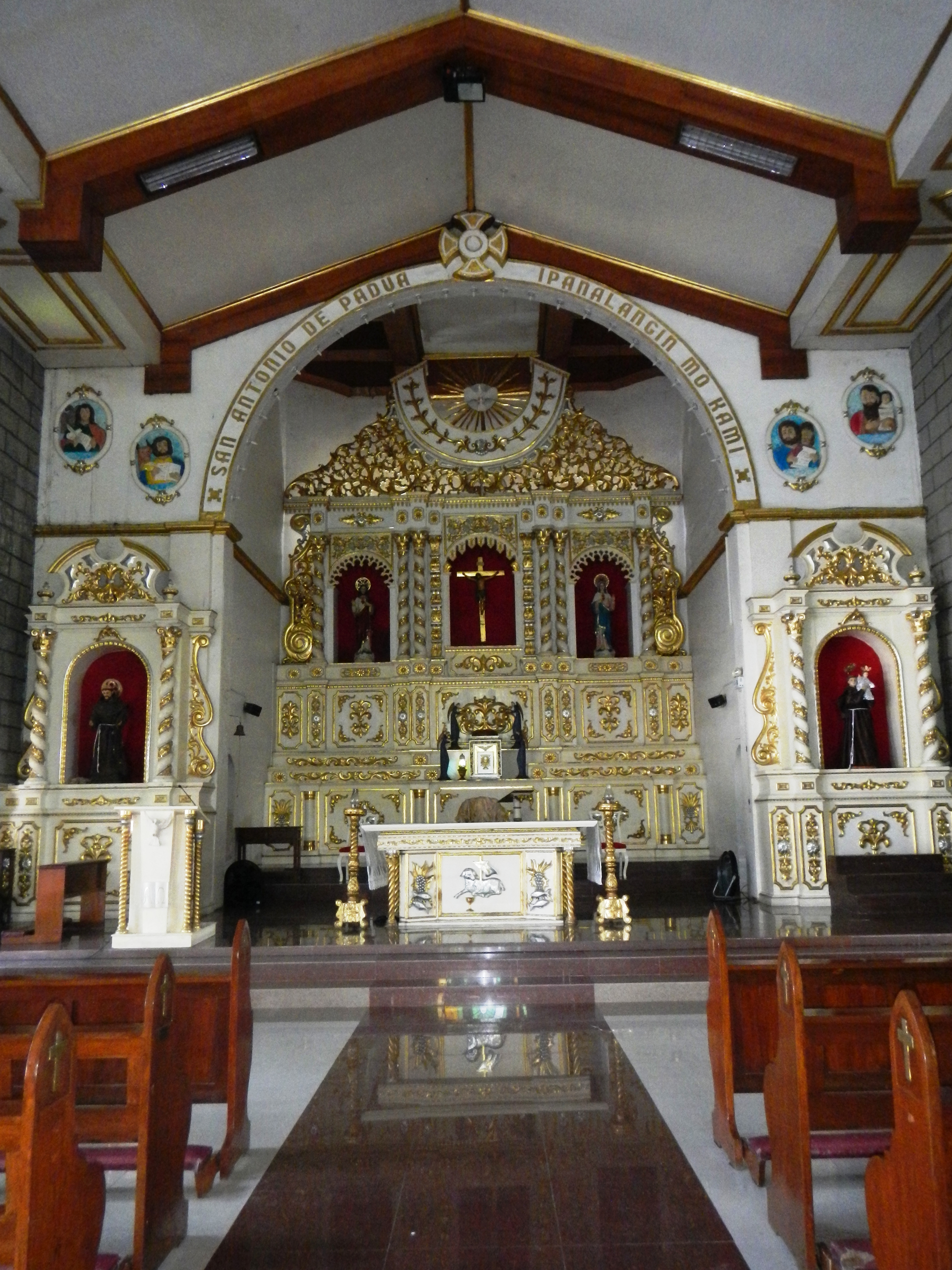
Interior of St. Anthony of Padua Parish Church

The church is situated at Barangay Iba, Hagonoy, Bulacan. It is composed of the sub-parish churches of Carillo, Iba-Ibayo, and Palapat in Hagonoy, and Iba O'Este and Iba Este in the town of Calumpit up North.

=== Our Lady of Perpetual Help Parish Church ===
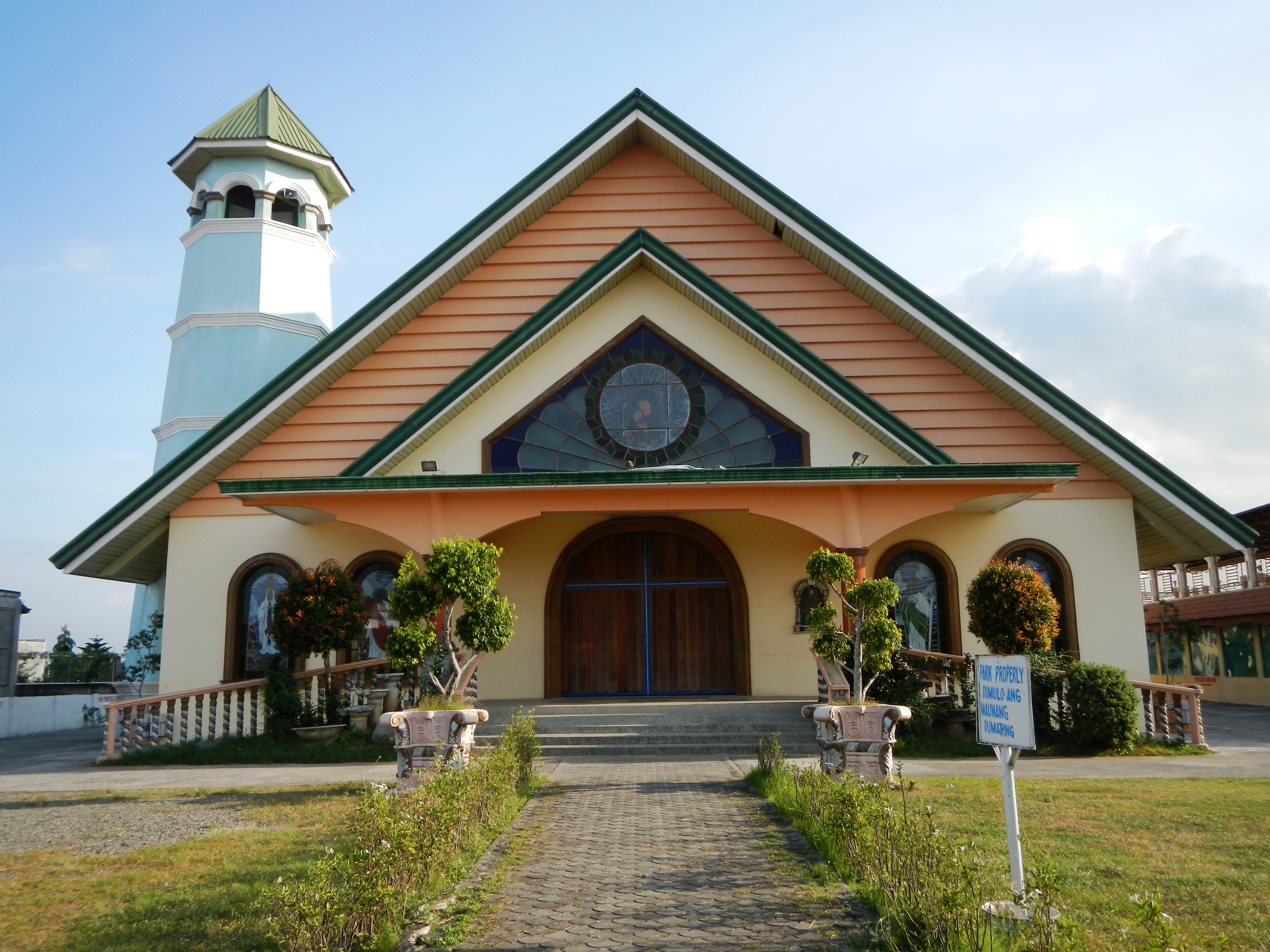
Façade of Our Lady of Perpetual Help Parish Church

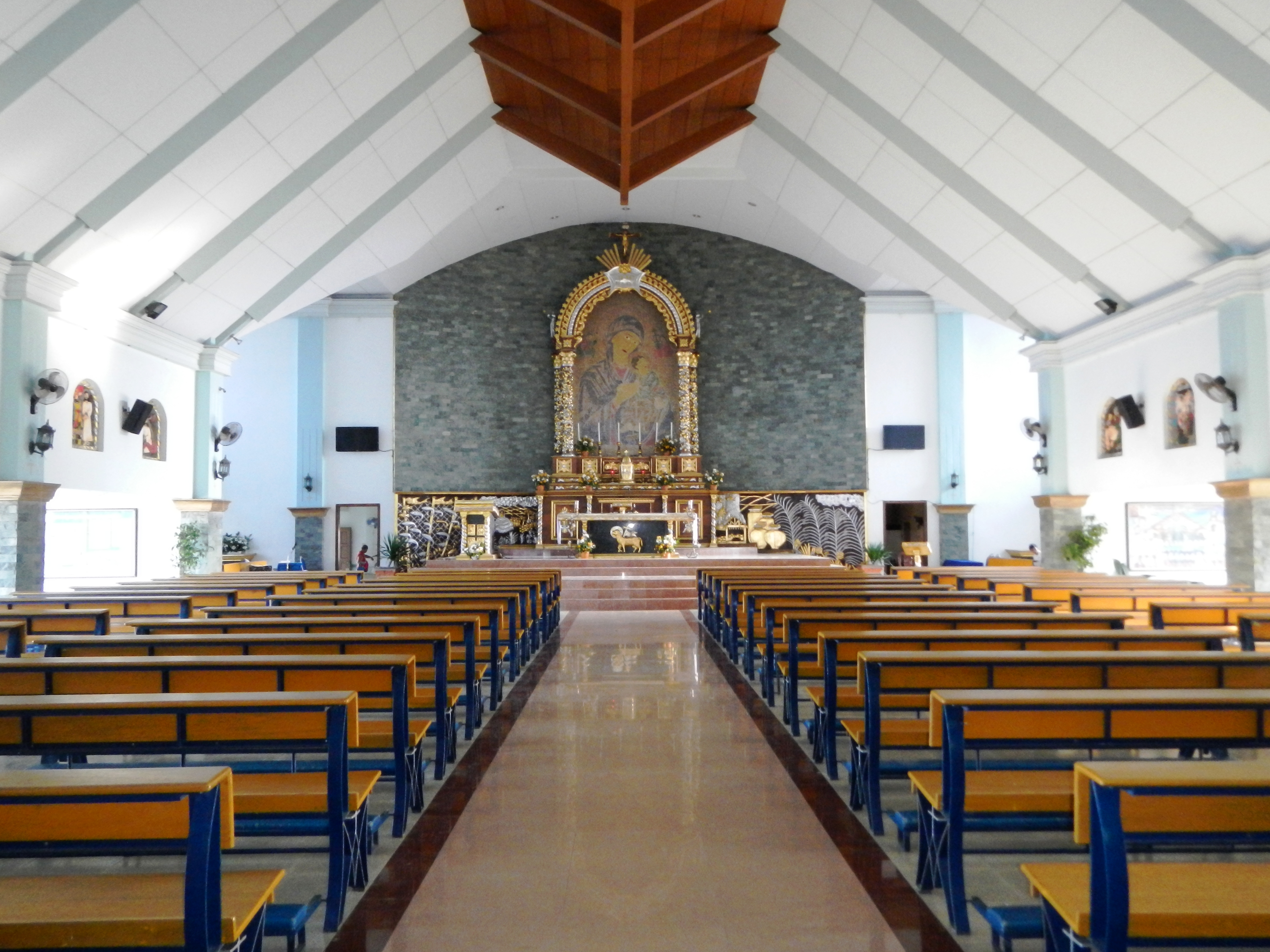
Interior of Our Lady of Perpetual Help Parish Church

The church is situated at Barangay San Pedro, Hagonoy, Bulacan. It is composed of the sub-parish churches of Abulalas and San Pablo in Hagonoy, and San Isidro II in the town of Paombong.

=== Our Lady of the Most Holy Rosary Parish Church ===
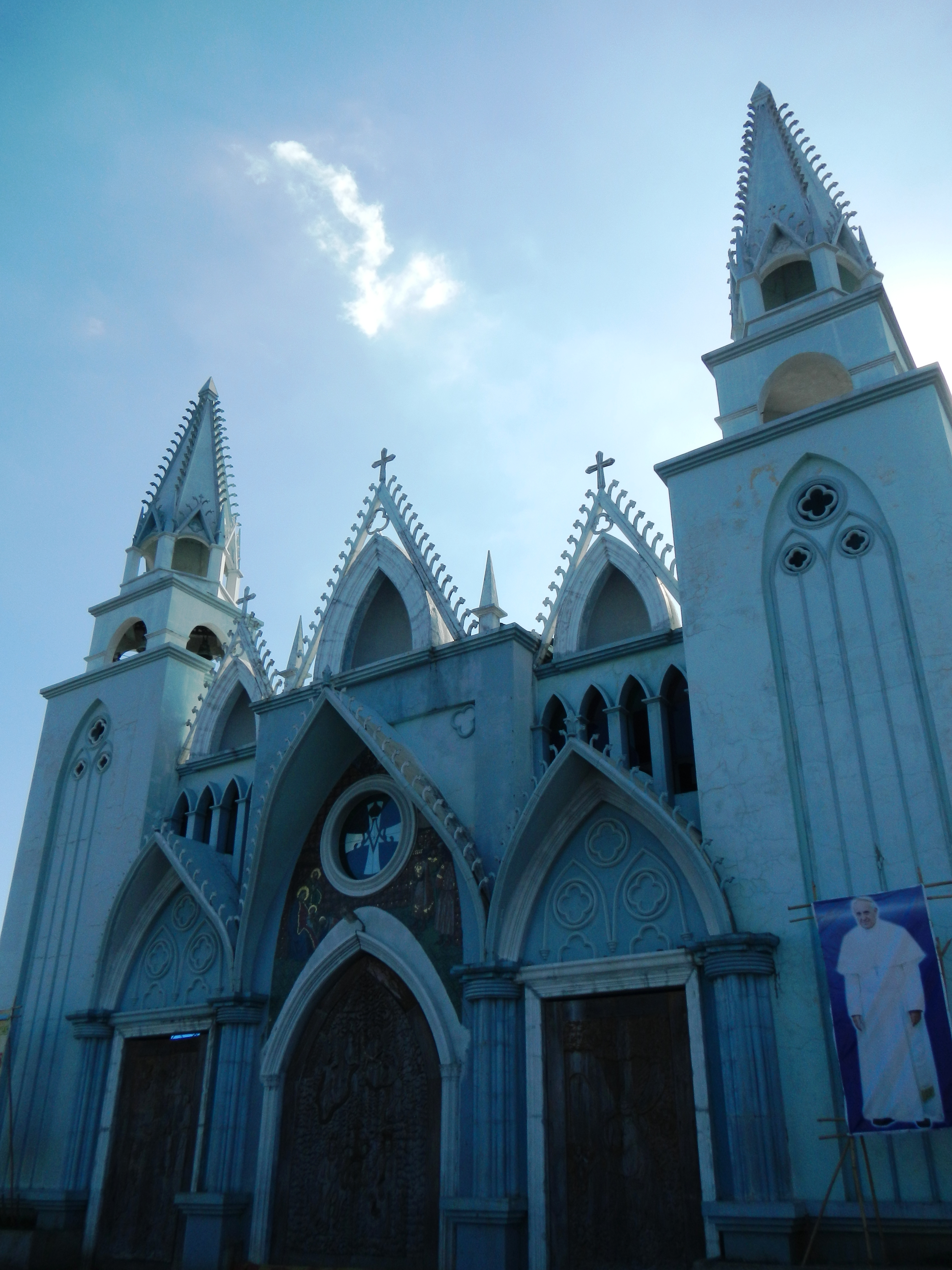
Façade of Our Lady of the Most Holy Rosary Parish Church

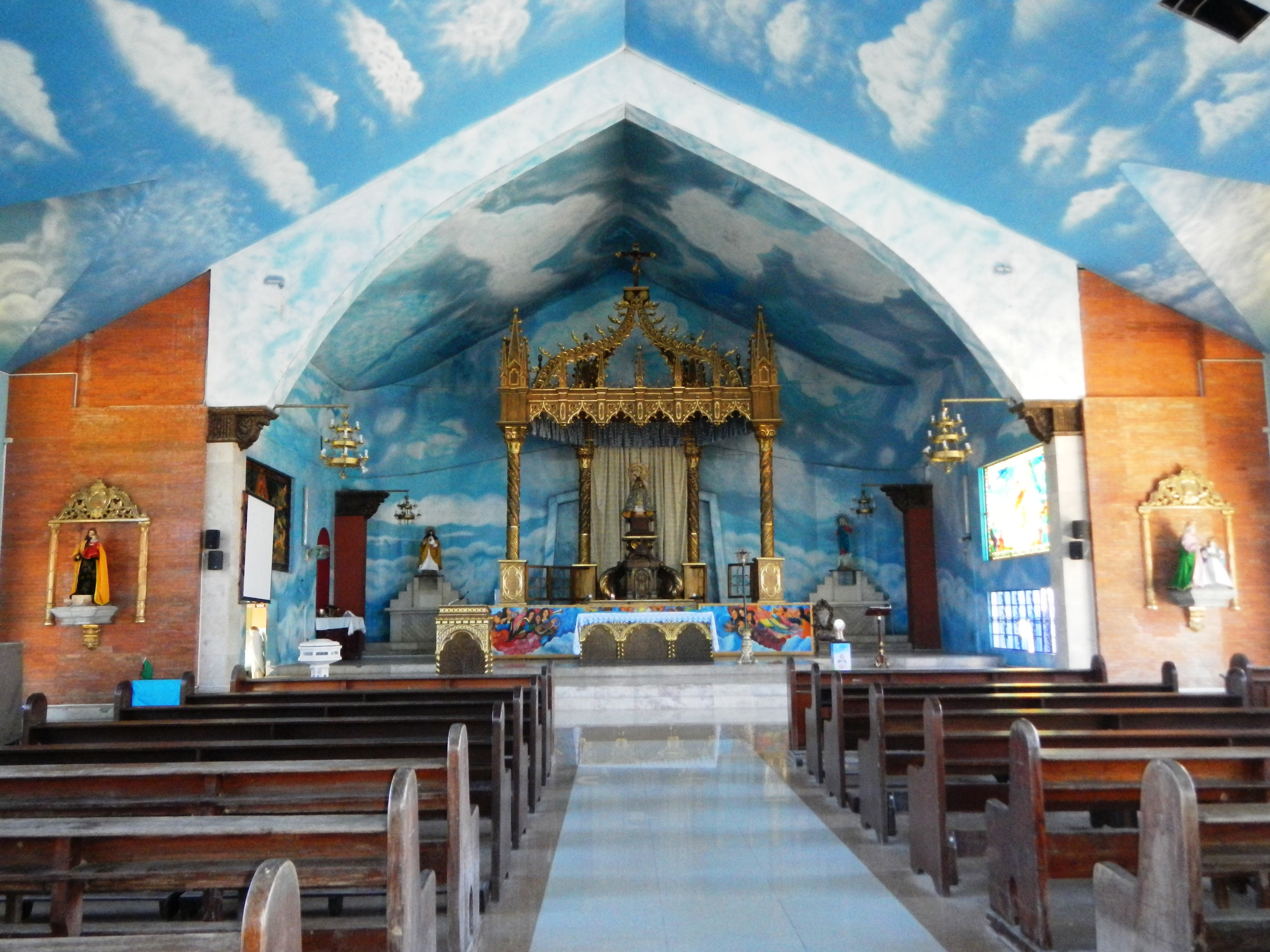
Interior of Our Lady of the Most Holy Rosary Parish Church

The church is situated at Barangay Santo Rosario, Hagonoy, Bulacan. It is composed of the sub-parish churches of Mercado, Santa Cruz, San Pascual, and San Roque.

== Culture ==
Annual fiestas are held to honor the town's and each barangay's patron saints. The town's patron saint is St. Anne (the mother of the Blessed Virgin Mary) or fondly called "Apo Ana" in the vernacular by the natives. She is enshrined at the church named after her in the poblacion. This church is a National Shrine. There are also small fiestas among the different puroks of the barangays, there are feasts for the: Sacred Heart of Jesus, Our Lady of the Rosary, and other commemorative feasts of the Catholic Church. The Holy Week observance includes self flagellants on the road, zarzuelas, the "pabasa" (the passion sang as a psalm), the Good Friday and Easter dawn processions, in all parish churches. The Good Friday processions of the Parishes like the Poblacion and the Santo Rosario parishes are attended by at least 15 to 30 Lenten icons. The fiestas and Holy Week rituals are deemed as a sacred tradition. Some barangays hold their feasts with extraordinary roadside decorations and buntings so elaborate that the road is almost covered with overhead decor sufficient to screen-off the sunlight at noontime.

Major Fiestas in Hagonoy such as the Santo Niño Fiesta, Santa Elena Fiesta, and the town Fiesta and Foundation Day are some of the major festivities in town.

Date	Event
1 January or Last Sunday of April	Feast of the Holy Family (Barangay Sagrada Familia)
9 January	Feast of the Black Nazarene (Barangay San Agustin – Parong-Parong)
20 January	Feast of St. Sebastian (Barangay San Sebastian)
25 January	Feast of the Conversion of St. Paul the Apostle (Barangay San Pablo)
3 February	Ka Blas F. Ople Day (Commemorating the Birth of Hagonoy's Proud of Son)
11 February	Feast of Our Lady of Lourdes (Barangay Abulalas)
3rd Sunday of January (liturgical) & 2nd or 3rd Sunday of February (civil)	Feast of the Infant Jesus (Barangay Santo Niño)
2 April	Balagtas Day (Commemorating the birth of Francisco Baltazar)
10 April	Feast of Our Lady of Barangay (Barangay San Sebastian - Peralta)
Last Sunday of April	Pista ng Sama-samang Pasasalamat ng Bayang Hagonoy (Barangay Santo Niño – Poblacion)
1 May	Feast of St. Joseph the Worker (Barangay San Jose)
1 May & 14 September	Feast of the Holy Cross (Barangay Santa Cruz)
4 May	Feast of St. Helena, the Empress (Barangay Santa Elena)
1st Saturday of May	Feast of St. Monica (Barangay Santa Monica)
2nd week of May & 13 June	Feast of St. Anthony of Padua (Barangay Iba-Ibayo)
2nd week of May & 1st Sunday of October	Feast of the Most Holy Rosary (Barangay Santo Rosario)
8 May	Feast of St. Michael, the Archangel (Barangay San Miguel)
15 May	Feast of St. Isidore the Laborer, the Farmer (Barangay Tampok & Barangay San Isidro)
17 May	Feast of St. Paschal Baylon (Barangay San Pascual)
3 June	Feast of the Holy Trinity (Barangay San Agustin - Mestiza)
13 June	Feast of St. Anthony of Padua (Barangay Iba & Barangay Palapat)
24 June	Feast of St. John the Baptist (Barangay San Juan)
27 June	Feast of the Our Lady of Perpetual Help (Barangay San Pedro)
29 June	Feast of St. Peter, the Apostle (Barangay San Pedro)
26 July	Feast of St. Anne, Mother of Our Lady, Patroness of Hagonoy / Foundation Day of the town of Hagonoy / Palaisdaan Festival (Barangay Santo Niño – Poblacion)
31 July	Feast of St. Ignatius of Loyola (Barangay Pugad)
15 August	Bulacan Day (Foundation Day of the Province of Bulacan)
16 August	Feast of St. Roch (Barangay San Roque)
28 August	Feast of St. Augustine (Barangay San Agustin)
30 August	Marcelo H. Del Pilar Day (Commemorating the Birth of the Great Propagandist)
10 September	Feast of St. Nicholas of Tolentine (Barangay San Nicolas)
11 September	Thanksgiving Feast of Our Lady of Perpetual Help (Barangay Tampok – Sapang Bundok)
1st Sunday of October or 7 October	Feast of Our Lady of the Holy Rosary (Barangay Carillo)
24 October	Feast of St. Raphael, the Archangel (Barangay Tibaguin)
29 October	Anniversary of the National Shrine of St. Anne (Barangay Santo Niño – Poblacion)
26 November	Thanksgiving Feast of Virgen de los Remedios (Barangay Mercado)
8 December	Feast of the Immaculate Conception (Barangay Santo Niño – Sapang Pari)

=== Palaisdaan Festival/Desposorio Festival ===
On July 24, 2015 the municipality formally introduced the Palaisdaan Festival (or Pangisdaan Festival). Aside from showcasing the main livelihood of the town, the festival also offers a variety of cultural and religious events which the town of Hagonoy is known for. It is a month-long celebration in honor of the town's patroness, Saint Anne, and the founding anniversary of Hagonoy as a pueblo way back 1581. The celebration usually starts when the image of St. Anne visits places around Hagonoy or even outside the town. The processional image is then brought back to the shrine to formally open the festivity for the 9-days novena, followed by the fluvial parade or pagoda in the river systems of Hagonoy. Indak-kalye or street dancing is also one of the highlights of the festival, where the traditional Desposorio is danced to the tune of Lerion hymn. Other activities before the fiesta include entertainment and cultural programs, games or laro ng lahi, religious activities like baptism and confirmation. The Visperas Mayores or the day before the fiesta is also a highlight, this is when the battle of marching bands happens.

== Social services ==
=== Protective services ===
Hagonoy is generally a peaceful community. Peace and order is being maintained by the Philippine National Police – Hagonoy Station staffed by 29 PNP personnel. The Hagonoy PNP is equipped by 24 long firearms and 17 short firearms, with 2 patrol cars and 4 motorcycles as service vehicles. In 2009, there were 113 reported crime incidence in the municipality. The crime solution efficiency rate is registered at 97.26%.

=== Health and nutrition ===
There are three hospitals operating in Hagonoy – two private hospitals and a government-controlled district hospital. The Emilio Perez Memorial District Hospital, situated at Barangay Santo Nino, is a 50-bed capacity hospital that offers secondary healthcare services. It is one of the district hospitals owned and controlled by the Provincial Government of Bulacan. Immediately beside it is the Mateo-Mabborang General Hospital, a private hospital which was opened on October 9, 2010. The Divine Word Hospital is a private hospital situated at Barangay San Pedro also offers secondary healthcare services.

These hospitals are being complemented by the Amado Aldaba Memorial Health Center, the main rural health unit (RHU) being operated by the municipal government. It offers primary healthcare services which also includes laboratory and dental services. Aside of this, three other rural health units in barangays San Juan, San Nicolas and Santo Rosario are also under the local government, headed by the municipal officer in RHU-Aldaba, and 3 other physicians are servicing the other RHUs.

The municipality also operates two physical therapy and rehabilitation centers. The first is located at the municipal compound while the other is situated at Barangay Santa Monica.

The medical personnel of the municipal government is composed of four Rural Health Physicians, four public nurses, 26 midwives, two sanitary inspectors, one medical technologist and two dentists. These are aided by the 172 Barangay Health Workers at the barangay level.

On the other hand, nutrition program is being implemented by the Municipal Nutrition Office. At the barangay, they are assisted by the 29 Lingkod Lingap sa Nayon (LLNs) supported by 189 Mother Leaders. As of 2008, there were 35 identified very low and 565 low nutritional status in Hagonoy.

=== Transportation ===
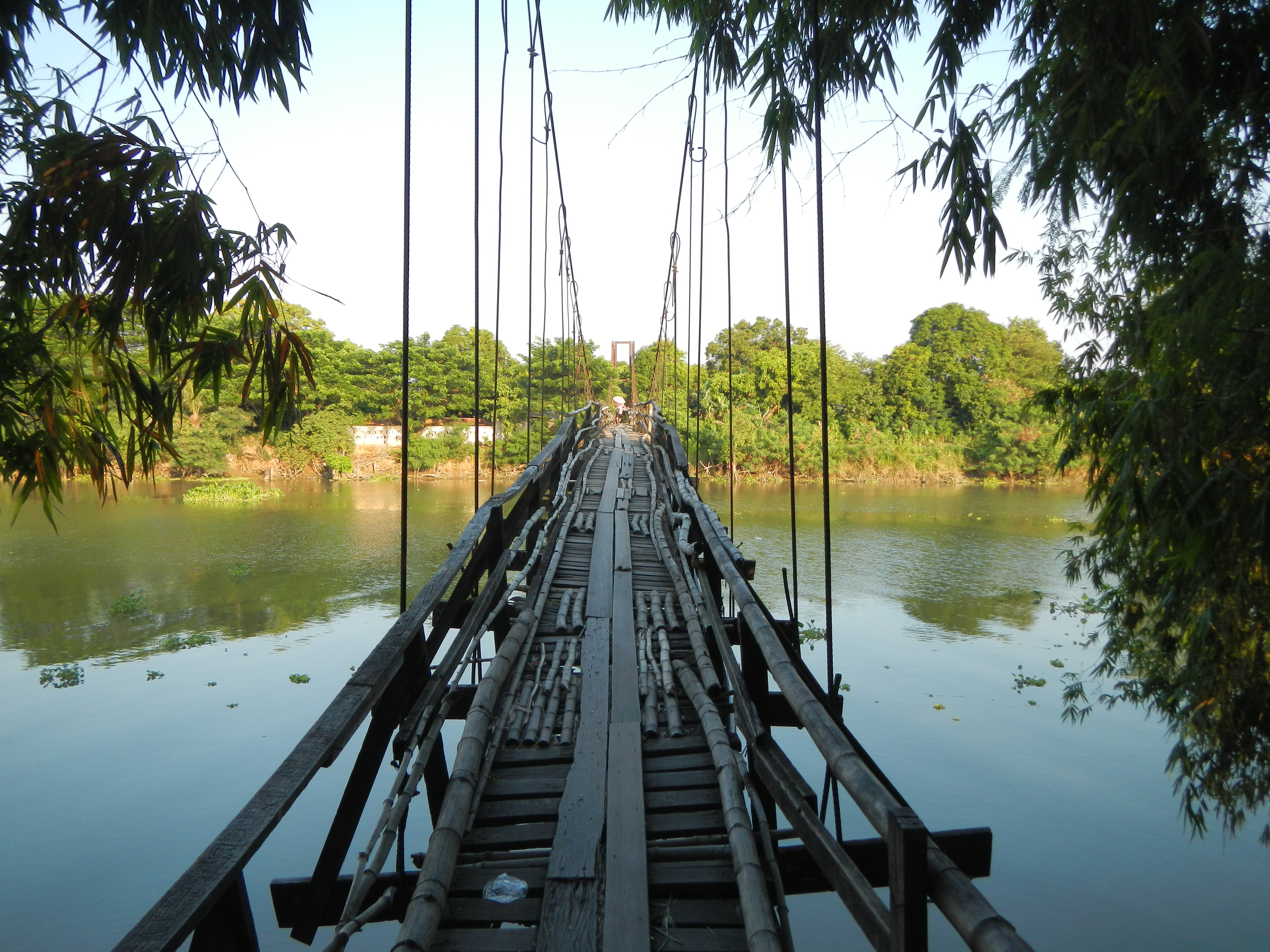
The hanging bridge

In Hagonoy, the primary and most dominant mode of transportation is tricycle because of its narrow roads. In 2011, there are 4,671 registered members of Tricycle Operators and Drivers Association (TODA) in Hagonoy servicing all barangays except Pugad and Tibaguin. Both of those barangays are being served by passenger boats.

Other modes of transportation are jeepneys and buses. There are about 565 registered jeepneys in Hagonoy plying 2 routes – Hagonoy-Malolos Bayan, and Hagonoy-BSU-Malolos Crossing-Robinsons. Passenger buses transport passengers in Hagonoy to and from Divisoria, Monumento, Cubao and Pasay in Metro Manila via the 2 bus companies that are presently operating in Hagonoy. The Baliwag Transit having 32 buses leaving Hagonoy every 30 minutes and the First North Luzon Transit with 11 buses leaving every 45 minutes.

- Baliwag Transit
- First North Luzon Transit
- Jeepneys (going to Paombong, Malolos Bayan, BSU, Malolos Crossing, and Robinsons Malolos)
- Tricycles (most common mean of tranpostation locally)

Hanging and wooden bridges

The four hanging bridges which are now in state of disrepair are located in barangays Iba, Abulalas, Carillo and San Agustin. Barangay Abulalas' hanging bridge links it to Barangay San Isidro II in Paombong town. The bridge is about 200 meters long as it crossed the downstream of the Labangan Channel. In Barangay Carillo, residents said the hanging bridge in their village linking Barangay Abulalas was totally damaged just before the 2007 elections. Its steel cable snapped while supporters of a mayoralty candidate were crossing in April 2007. In Barangay San Agustin, residents are trying to protect what remains of their hanging bridge that links with Barangay San Pablo.

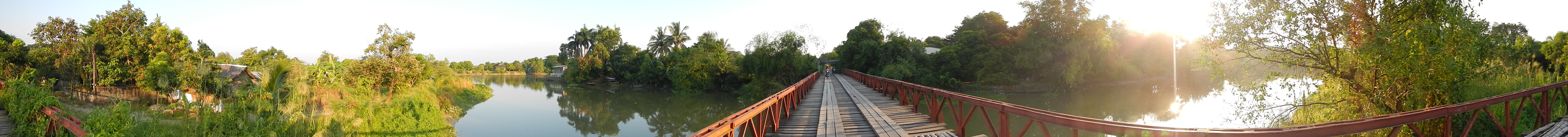
Panorama from the bridge over the Angat River

=== Power and water supply ===
The power requirement of the entire municipality is supplied by the Manila Electric Company (Meralco) including the coastal barangays of Pugad and Tibaguin. While the Hagonoy Water District provides the water requirement of Hagonoy. It supplies the daily water use of all 26 barangays using their 24 barangay pump stations.

=== Cemeteries ===
- Hagonoy Public Cemetery
- Hagonoy Catholic Cemetery
- Hagonoy Memorial Park
- Peralta Cemetery (San Sebastian)
- Santo Rosario Catholic Cemetery
- Santa Elena Catholic Cemetery
- San Juan Cemetery
- Iba Cemetery
- Cherubim of Heaven Memorial Park (San Pedro)

== Education ==
There are two schools district offices which govern all educational institutions within the municipality. They oversee the management and operations of all private and public, from primary to secondary schools. The schools disctice offices are Hagonoy East, and Hagonoy West.

The educational institutions in Hagonoy is composed of: 29 public elementary schools, 10 private elementary schools, 4 public secondary schools, 4 private schools, 26 Day Care Centers, 1 Technical/Vocational School and 1 satellite campus of a state university.

In School Year 2008–2009, the combined elementary school enrollment is 17,934, where 9 out of the 10 students are enrolled in public elementary school. On the other hand, secondary school enrolment is registered at 10,477 students, of which 78.45% are enrolled in public high school.

Every barangay has a Day Care Center with an assigned Day Care Worker. The total number of children enrolled is 1,315 in School Year 2008–2009, composed of 629 boys and 686 girls.

=== Primary and elementary schools ===
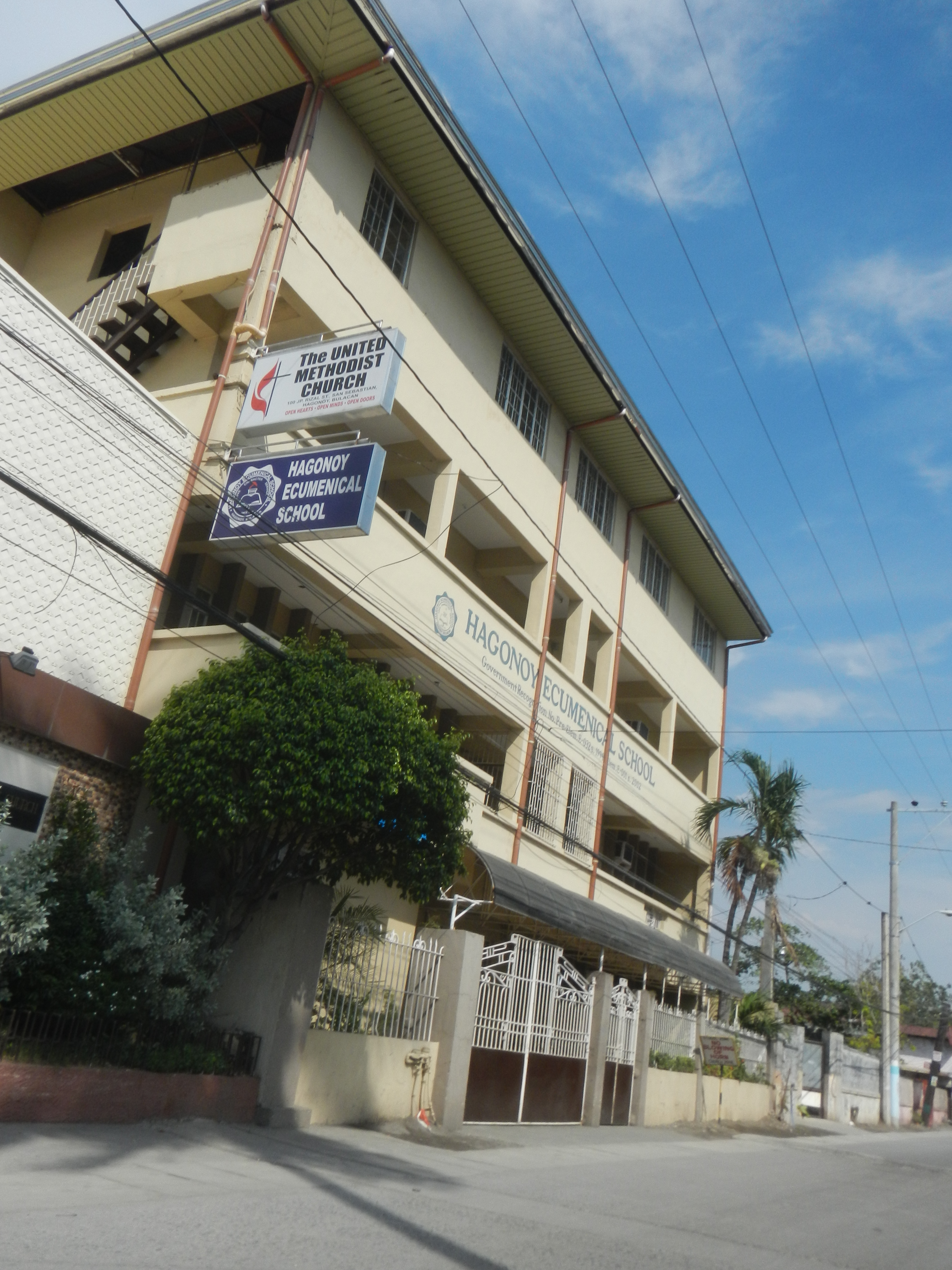
Hagonoy Ecumenical School

- Hagonoy East Central School (Santo Niño)
- Hagonoy West Central School (Santo Rosario)
- Abulalas Elementary School
- Carillo Elementary School
- Federico C. Suntay Elementary School (Palapat)
- Godwin's Montessori School
- Hagonoy Ecumenical School
- Hangga Elementary School (San Pedro)
- Holy Child School of Hagonoy
- Iba Elementary School
- Iba-Ibayo Elementary School
- Iba Poblacion Elementary School (Iba)
- Jesus is Lord Christian School
- Kid's Lane Learning Center
- Mercado Elementary School
- Mother of Perpetual Help School
- Pugad Elementary School
- Sagrada Familia Elementary School
- San Agustin Elementary School
- Eugenio G. Sy Tamco Elementary School (San Isidro)
- San Jose Elementary School
- San Juan Elementary School
- San Nicolas Elementary School
- San Pablo Elementary School
- San Pascual Elementary School
- San Roque Elementary School
- San Sebastian Elementary School
- Santa Elena Elementary School
- Santa Monica Elementary School
- Tampok Elementary School
- Tibaguin Elementary School
- Don Miguel Elementary School (San Nicolas)
- Saint Mary's Academy of Hagonoy
- Santiago Trillana Academy
- School of Wisdom for Ideal Children
- Sitio Buga Elementary School (Santa Elena)
- St. Anne's Catholic School
- Teodora Cruz Elementary School (San Miguel)
- VCRaymundo Elementary School (Santa Cruz)
- Victoria-Vazquez Christian School

=== Secondary schools ===
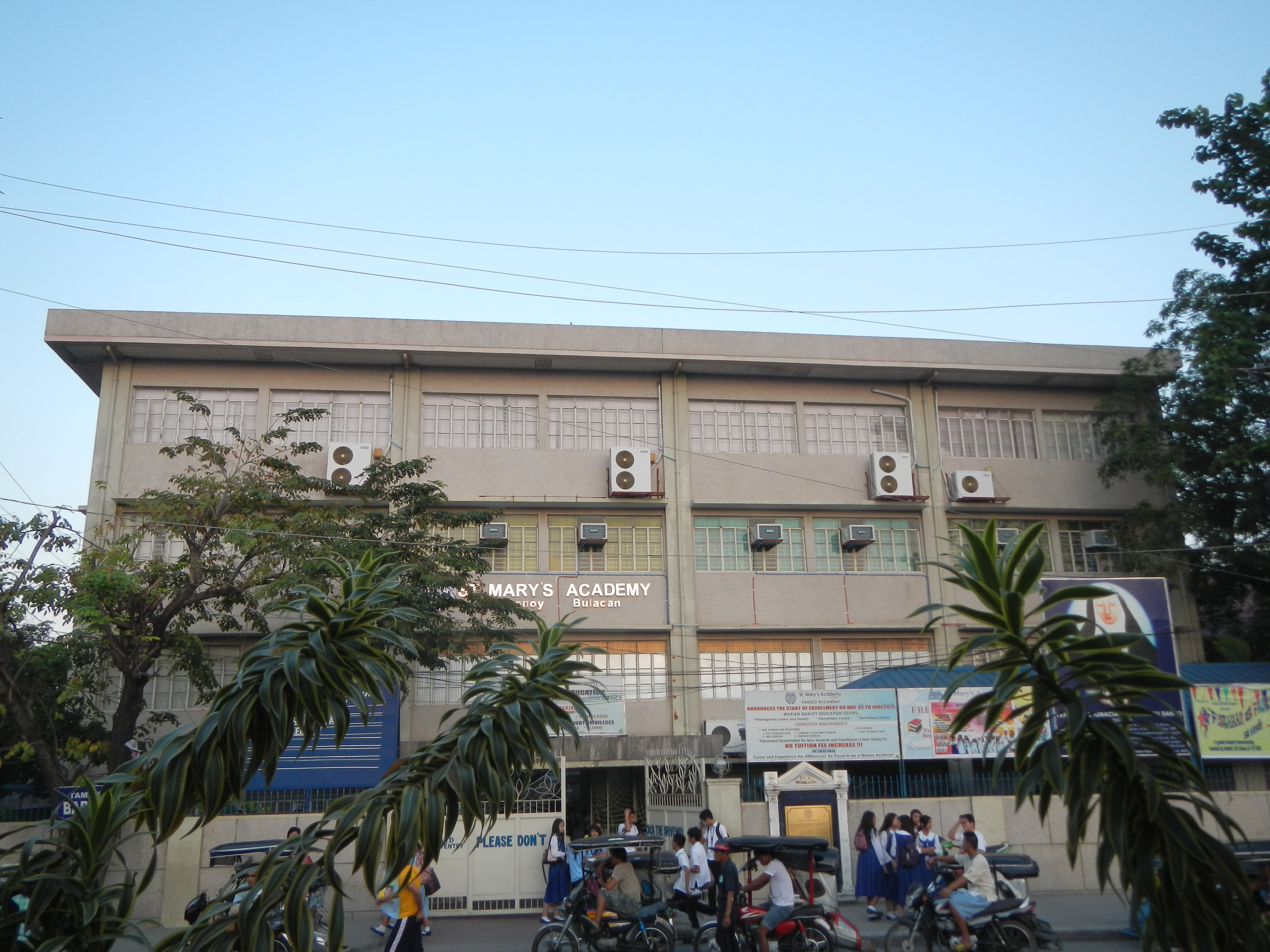
Saint Mary's Academy of Hagonoy

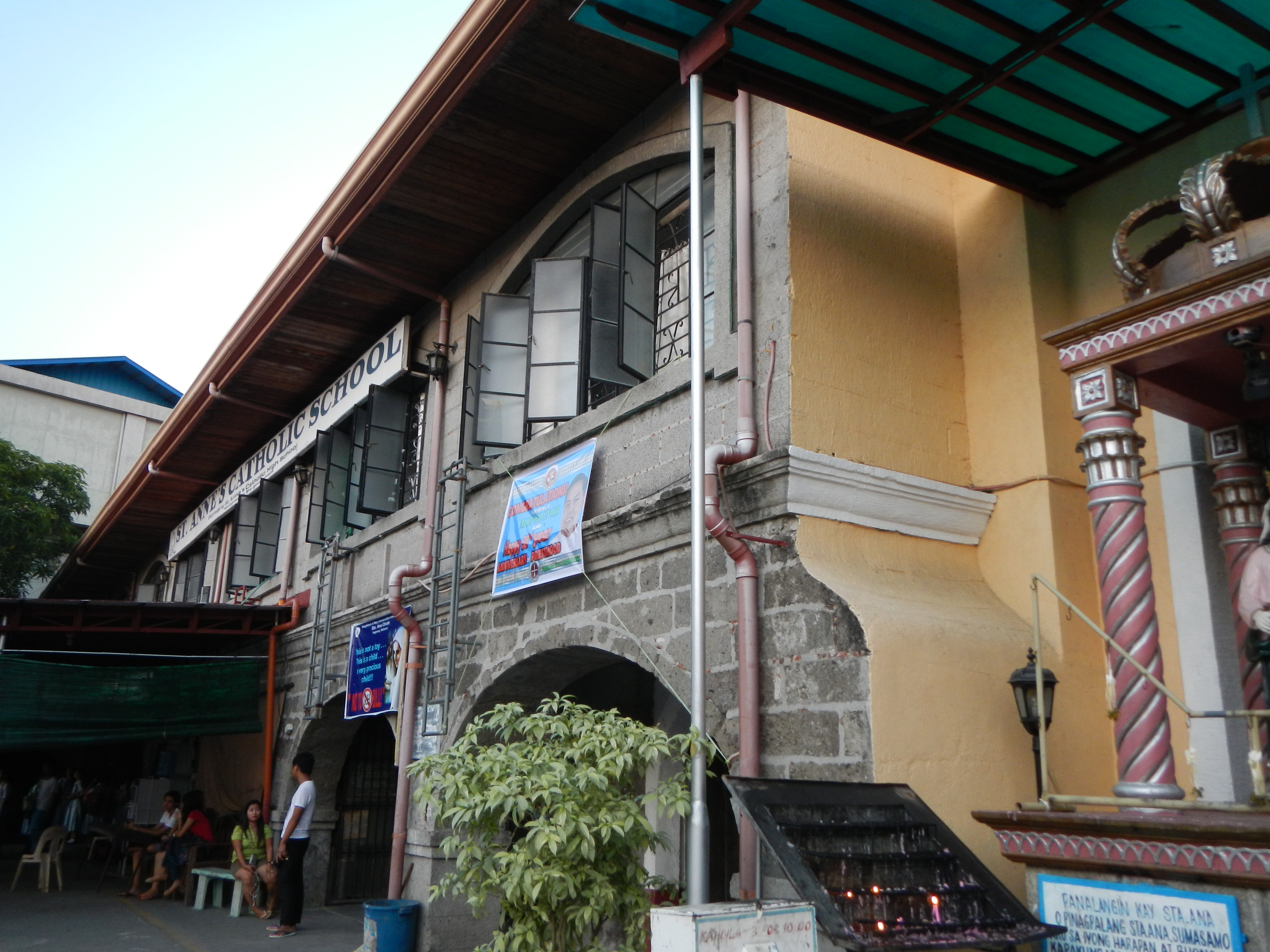
Saint Anne's Catholic School

- Don Miguel High School
- Godwin's Montessori School
- Iba National High School
- Mayor Ramona S. Trillana National High School
- Mother of Perpetual Help School (offering Junior High School only)
- Saint Anne's Catholic School (formerly known as Saint Anne's Catholic High School)
- Saint Mary's Academy of Hagonoy (or SMA, formerly known as Saint Anne's Academy)
- Santa Monica National High School
- San Pedro National High School

=== Higher educational institution ===
The Bulacan State University - Hagonoy Campus is a satellite university of Bulacan State University situated at Barangay Iba-Ibayo officially opened on June 7, 2011. The fourth satellite campus of BulSU offers courses on Criminology, Education, Engineering, Information Technology, Industrial Technology, Hospitality Management and Tourism Management.

== Notable personalities ==
- Pedro Bantigue - a Priest and Bishop who served as Auxiliary Bishop of the Archdiocese of Manila and first Bishop of the Diocese of San Pablo, Laguna.
- Blas Ople - a journalist and politician having served several high-ranking positions in the executive and legislative branch of the Philippine government including Senate President, Secretary of Foreign Affairs and Minister of Labor.
- Wilhelmino Sy-Alvarado - Filipino politician who served as Governor of Bulacan (2010–2019), Congressman of Bulacan’s 1st district (1998–2007), and Mayor of Hagonoy (1986–1998).
- Lorifel Lacap-Pahimna - a Filipino lawyer and jurist serving as the 65th Associate Justice of the Sandiganbayan.
- Susan Ople - a Filipina politician and advocate who served as the first Secretary of Migrant Workers.
- Amado V. Hernandez - a Filipino writer, labor leader and social activist who was named a National Artist of the Philippines for Literature.

== Gallery ==
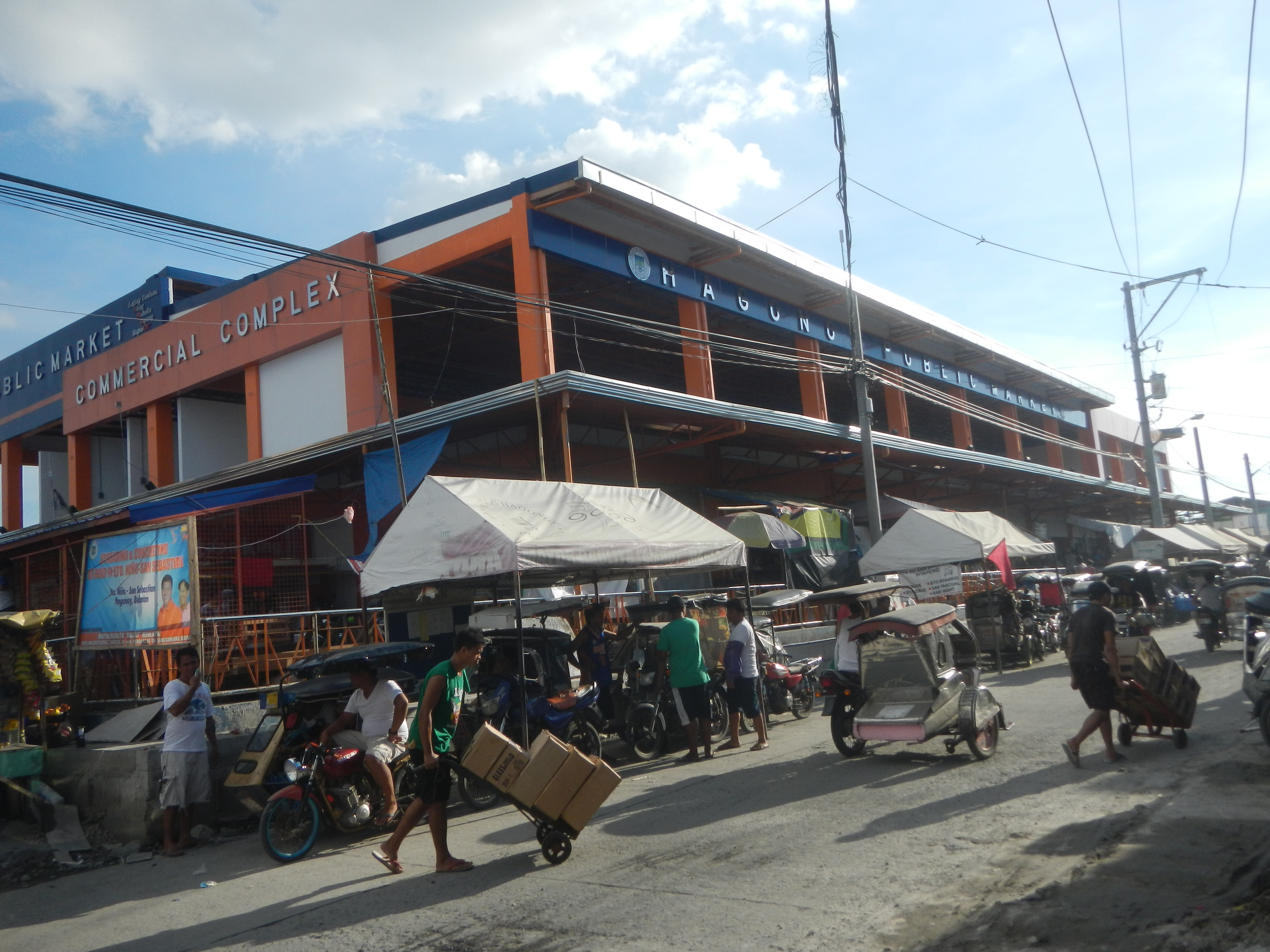
Hagonoy Public Market

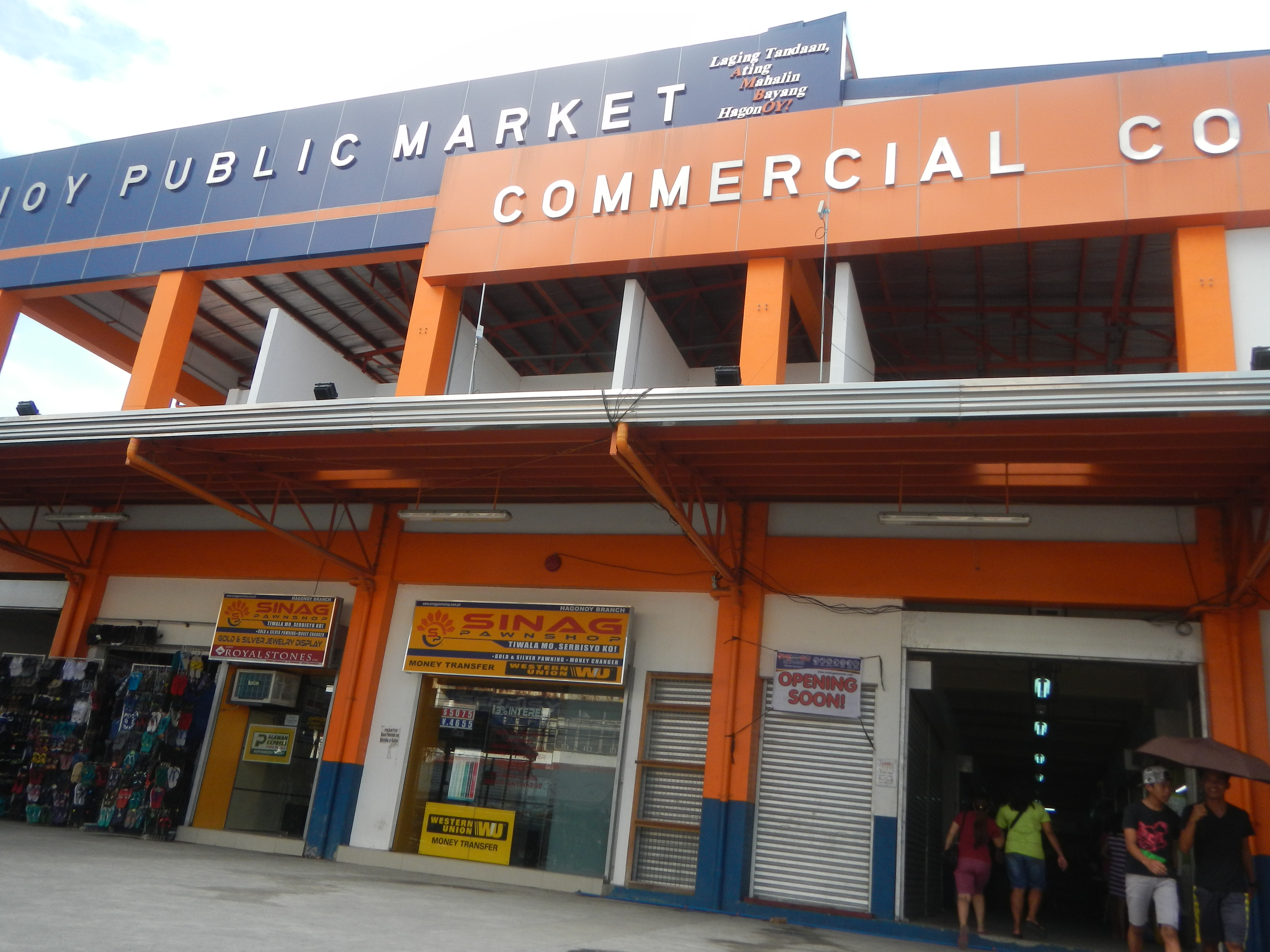
Hagonoy Public Market Commercial Complex

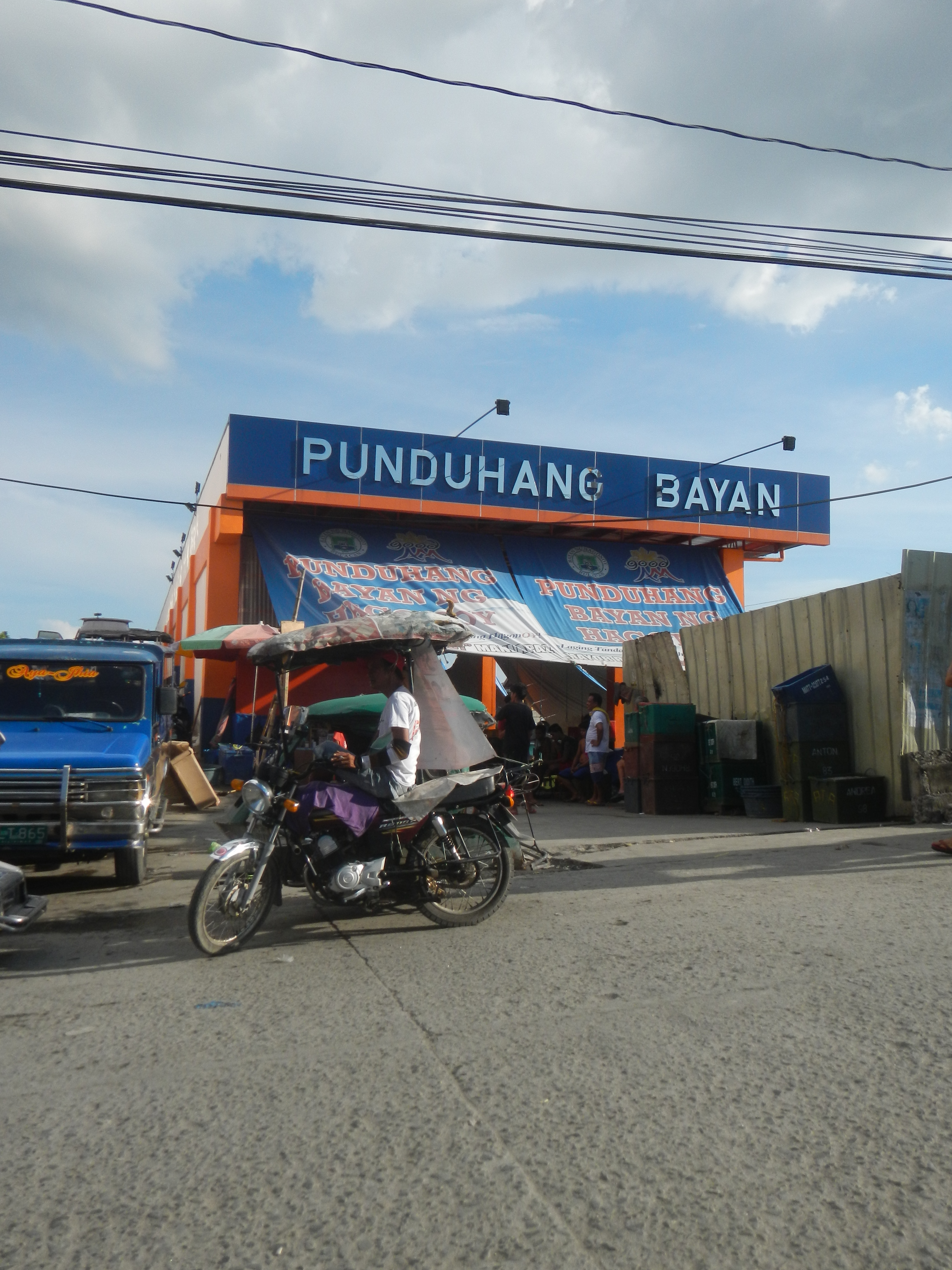
Punduhang Bayan ng Hagonoy

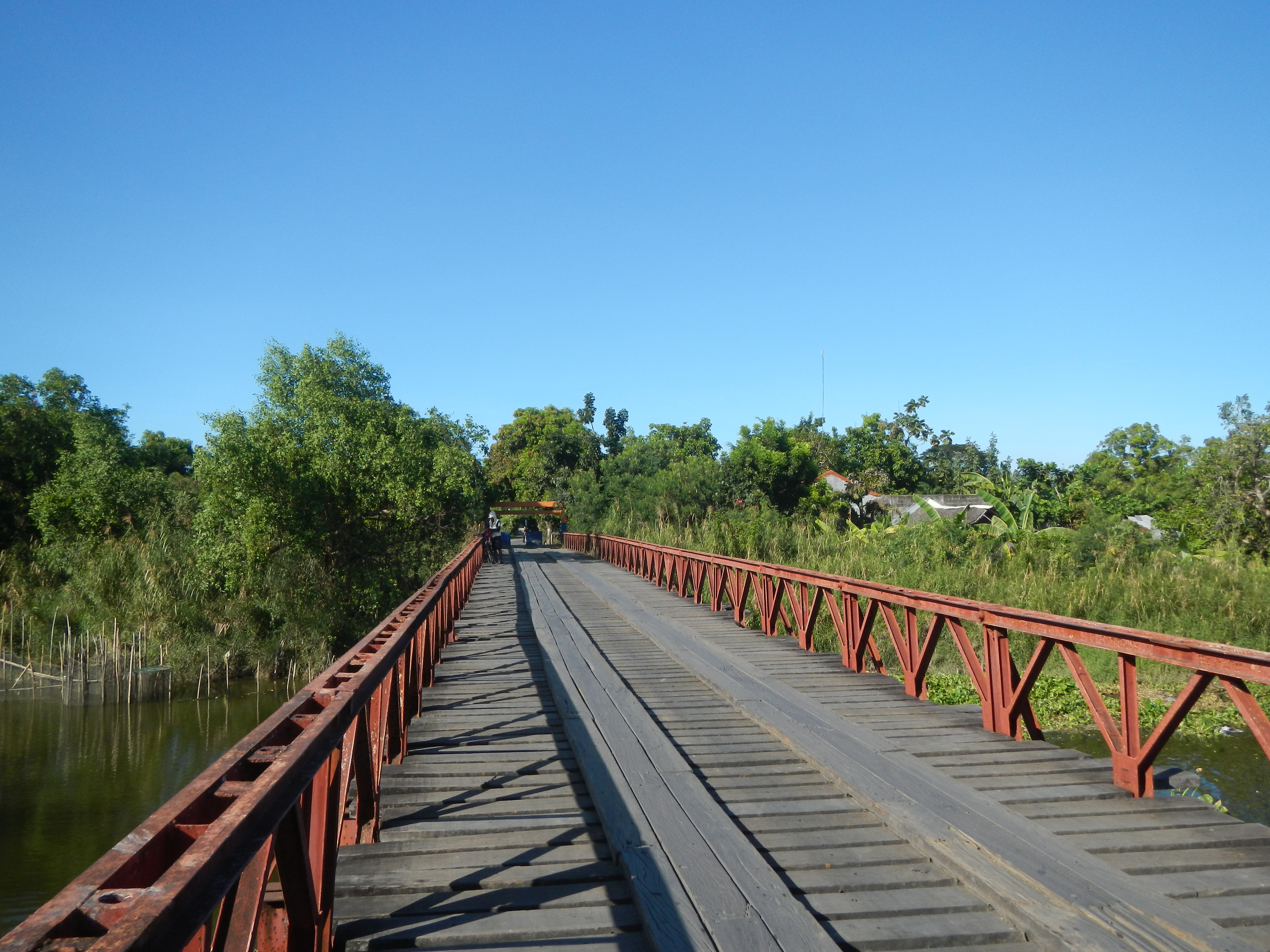
Abulalas Wooden Bridge (now destroyed and replaced by a concrete bridge; since 2020)

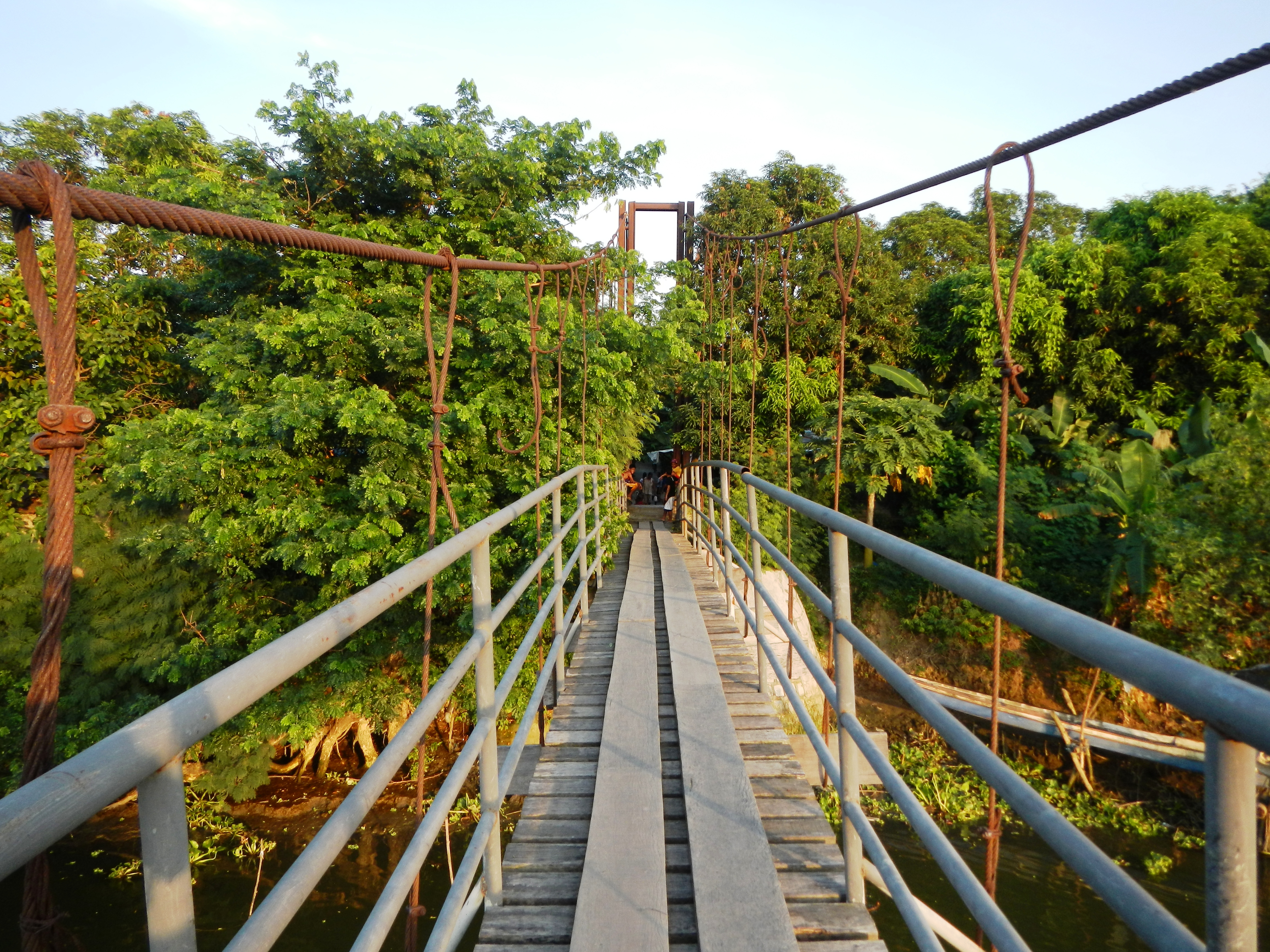
Abulalas Hanging Bridge

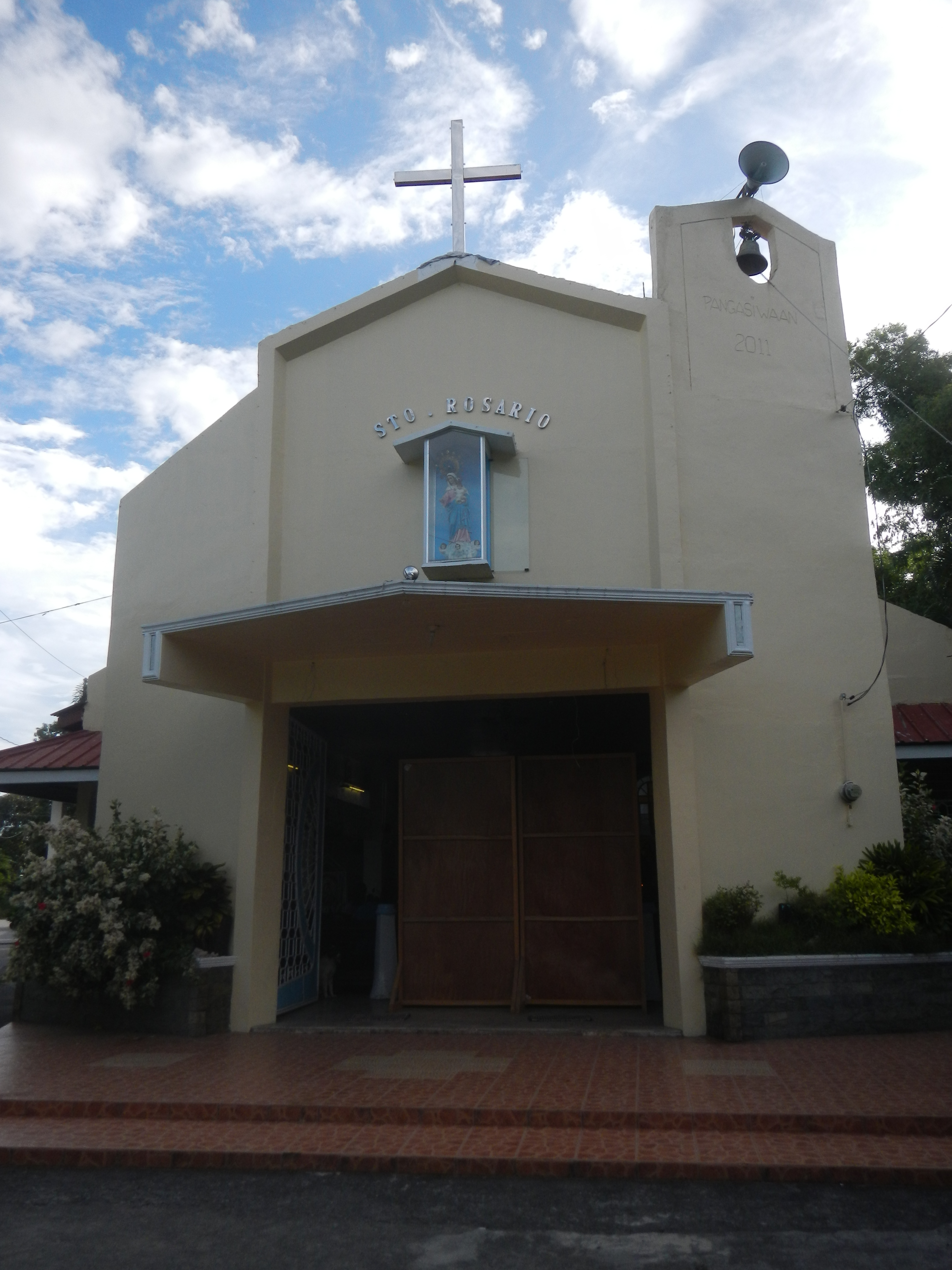
Sub-Parish Church of Nuestra Señora Del Santisimo Rosario (Barangay Carillo)

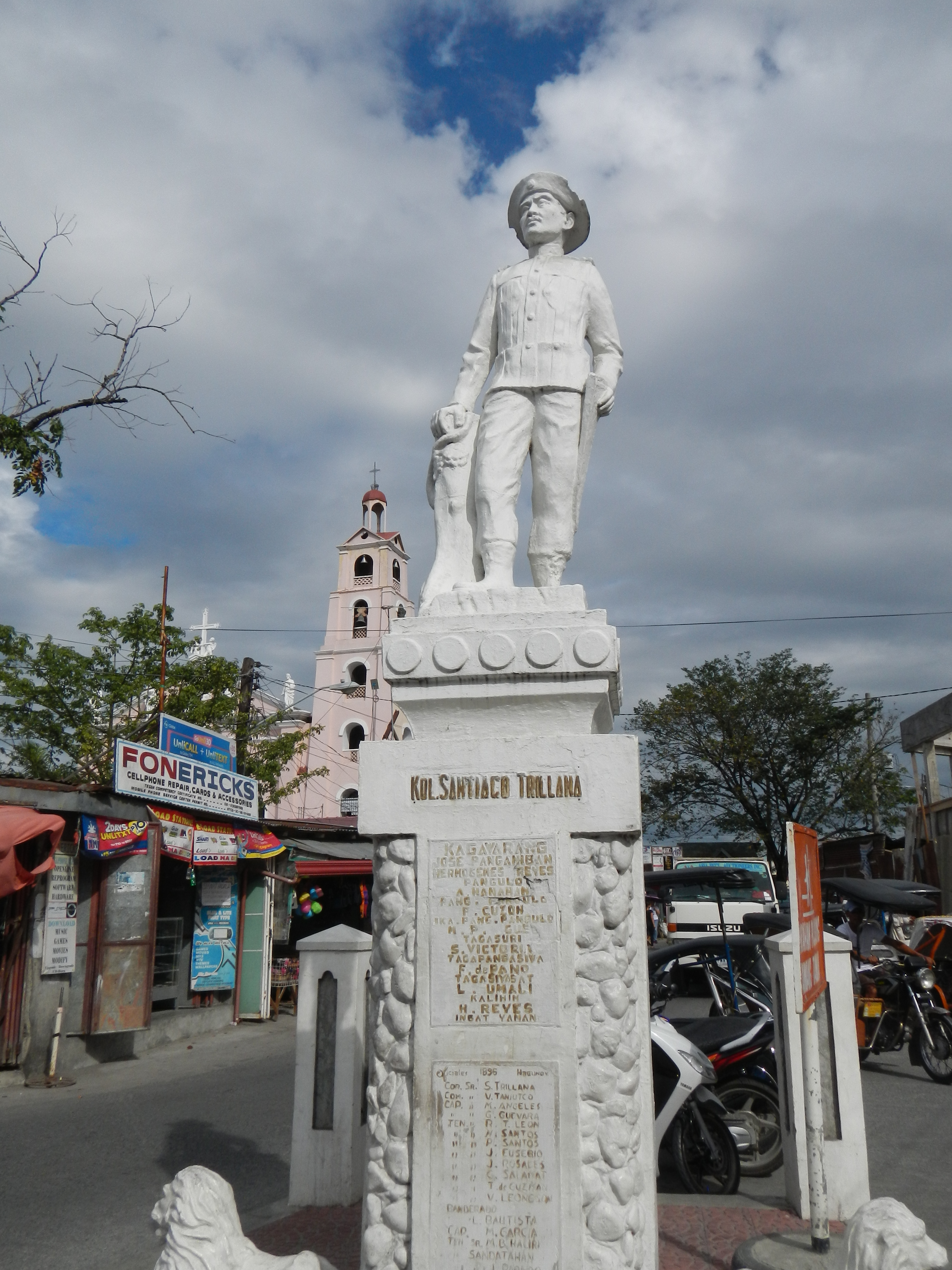
Col. Santiago Trillana Monument

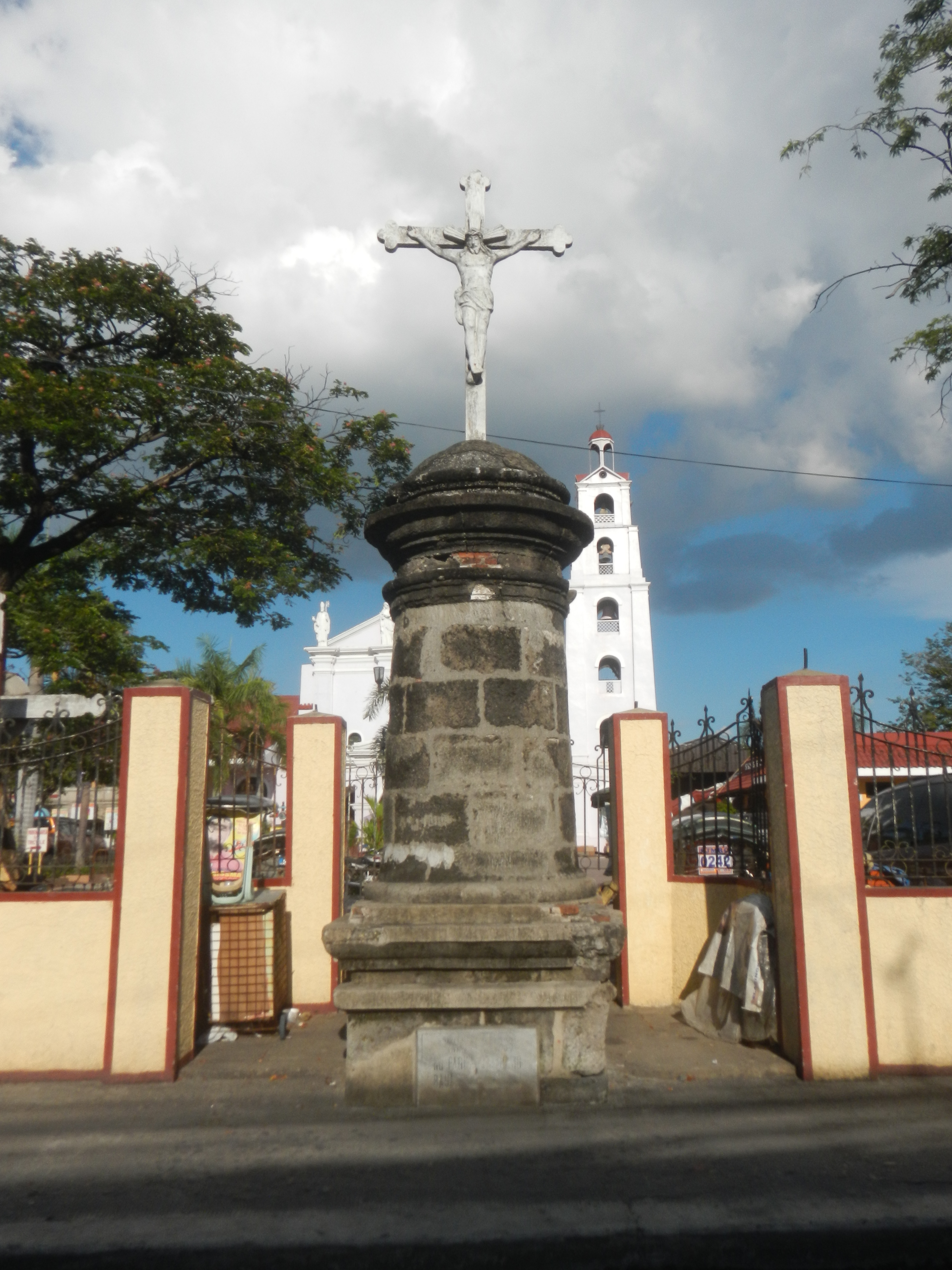
Holy Cross Marker for the foundation of Hagonoy

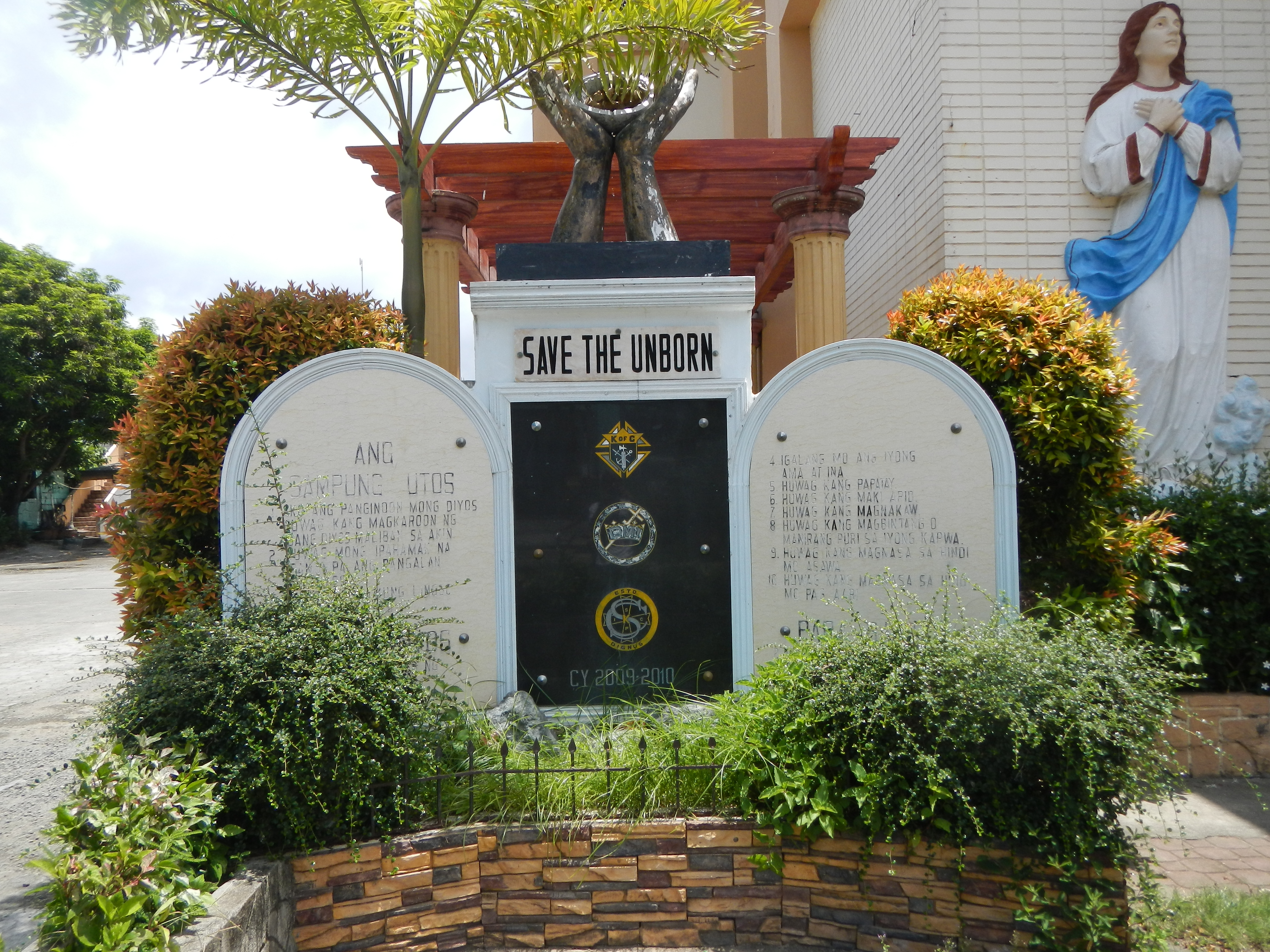
Save the Unborn Monument

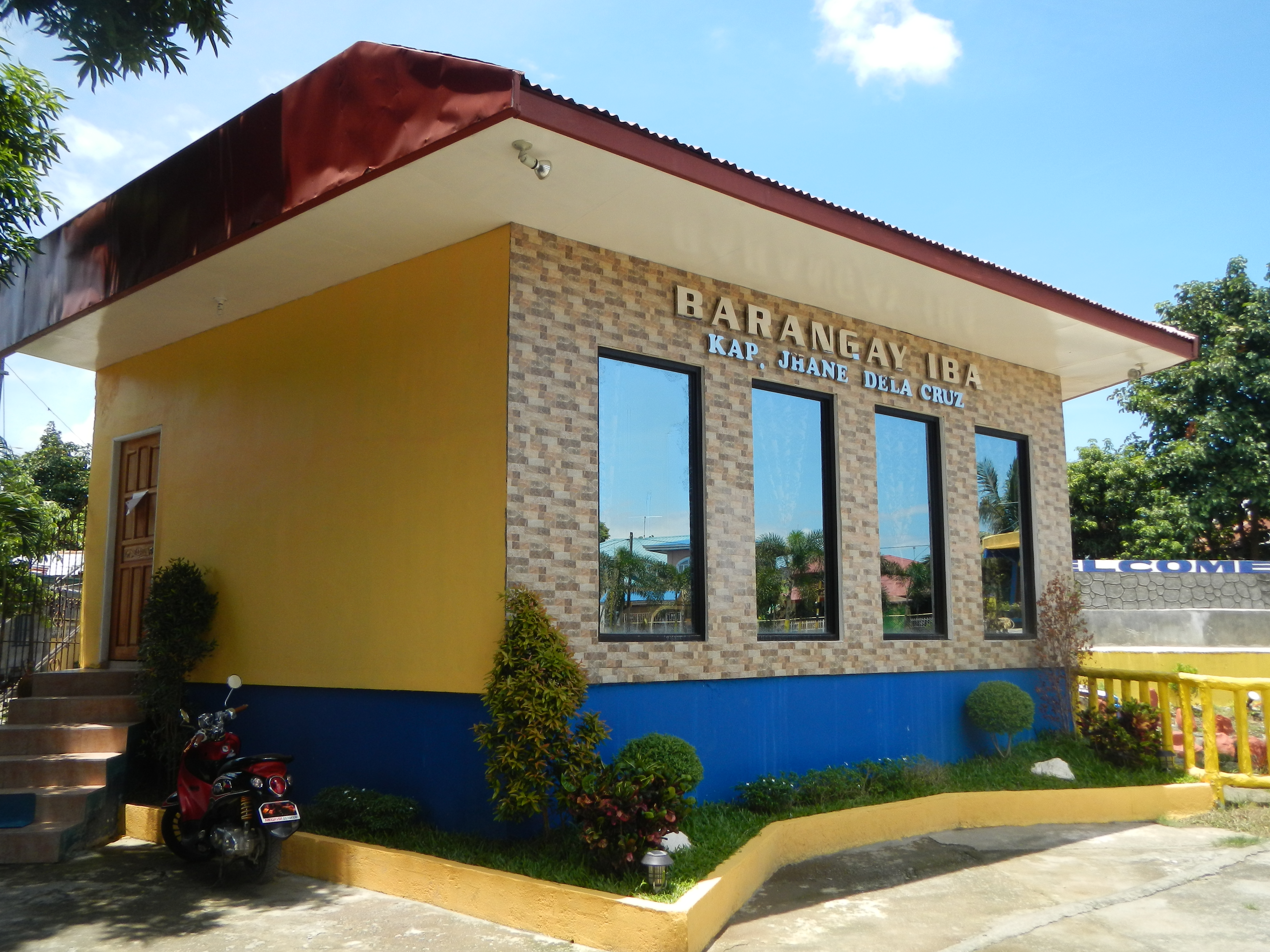
Iba Barangay Hall

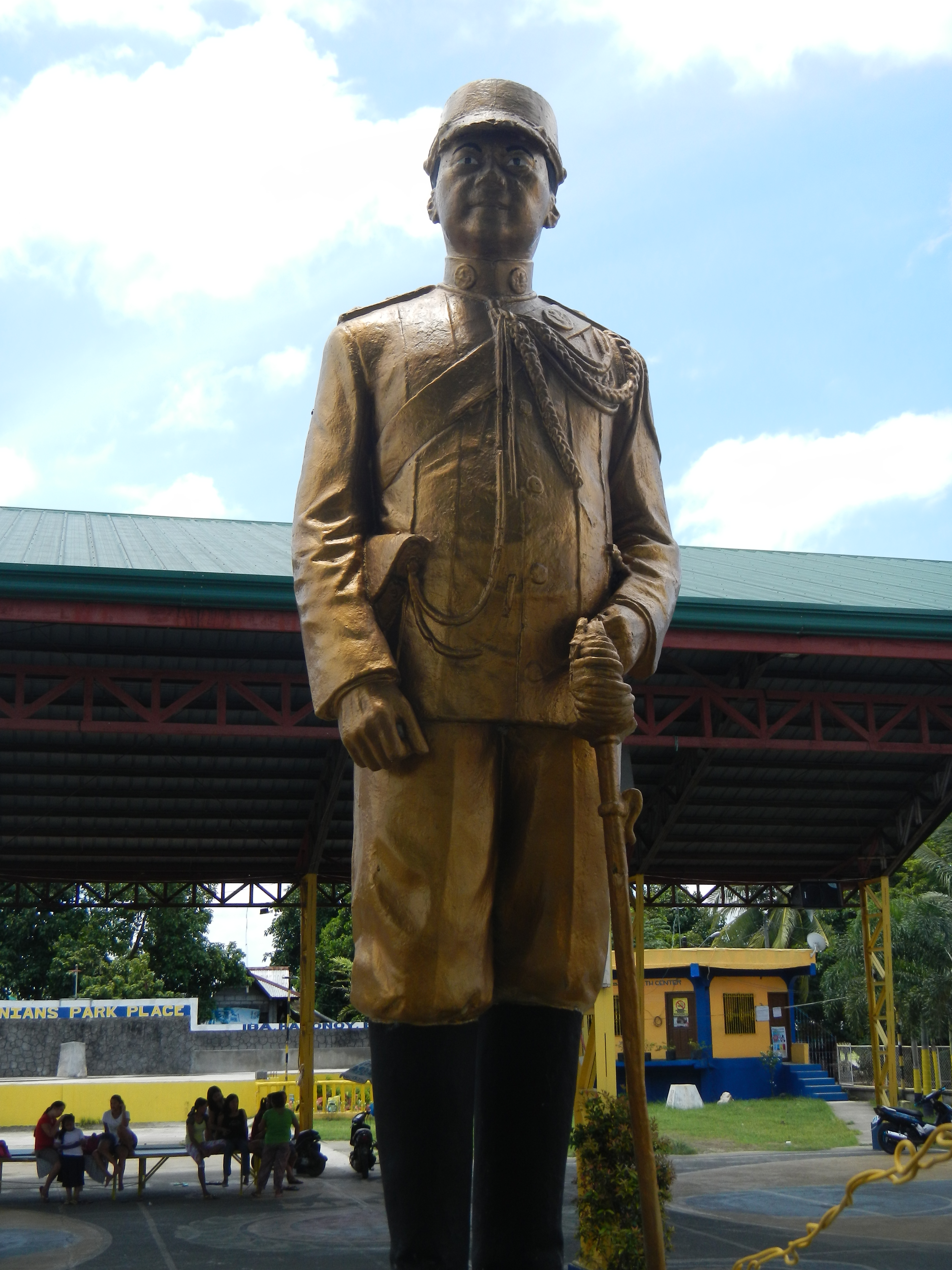
A monument in Ibanians Park Place

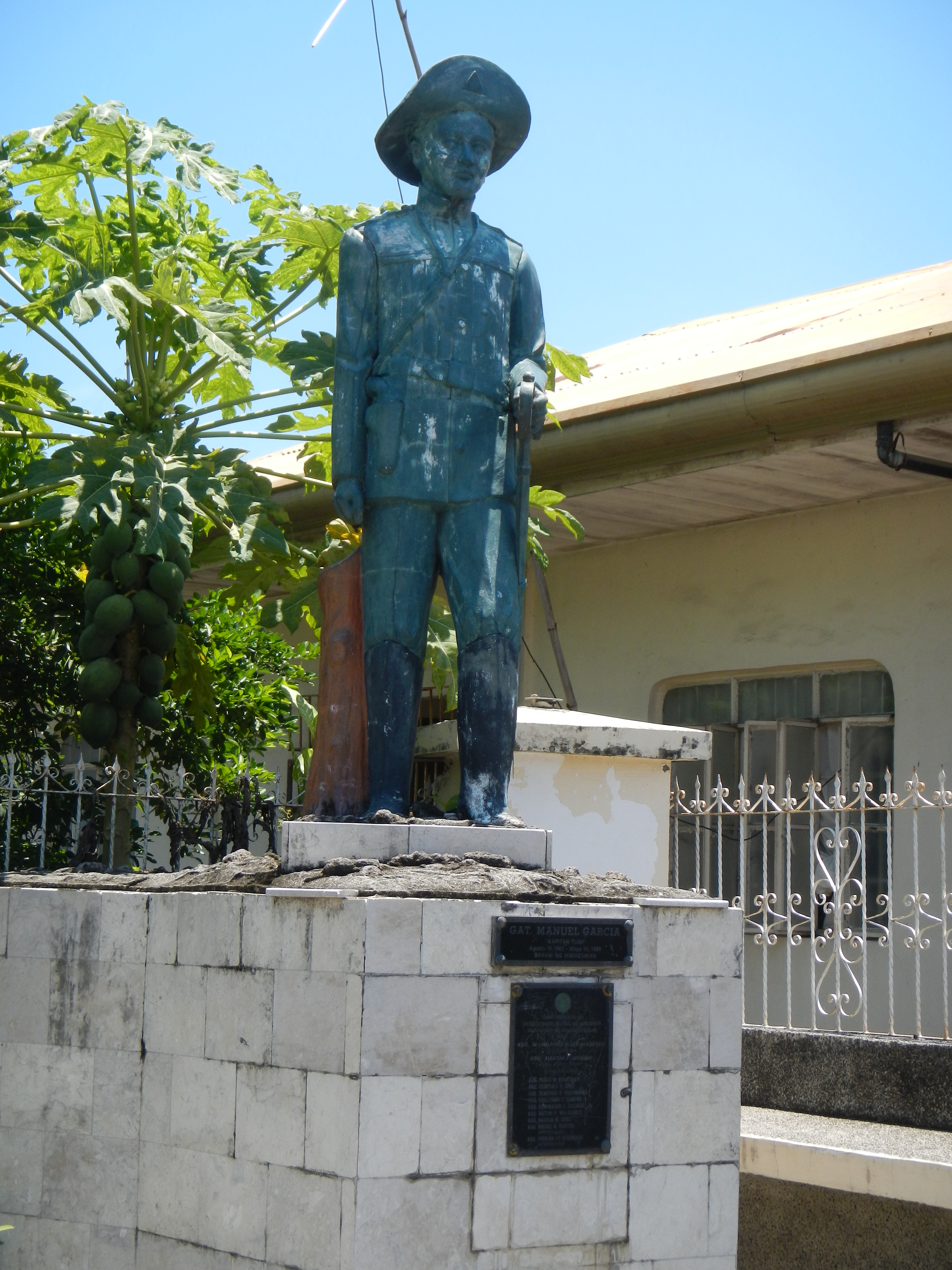
Manuel "Kapitan Tuwi" Garcia Monument

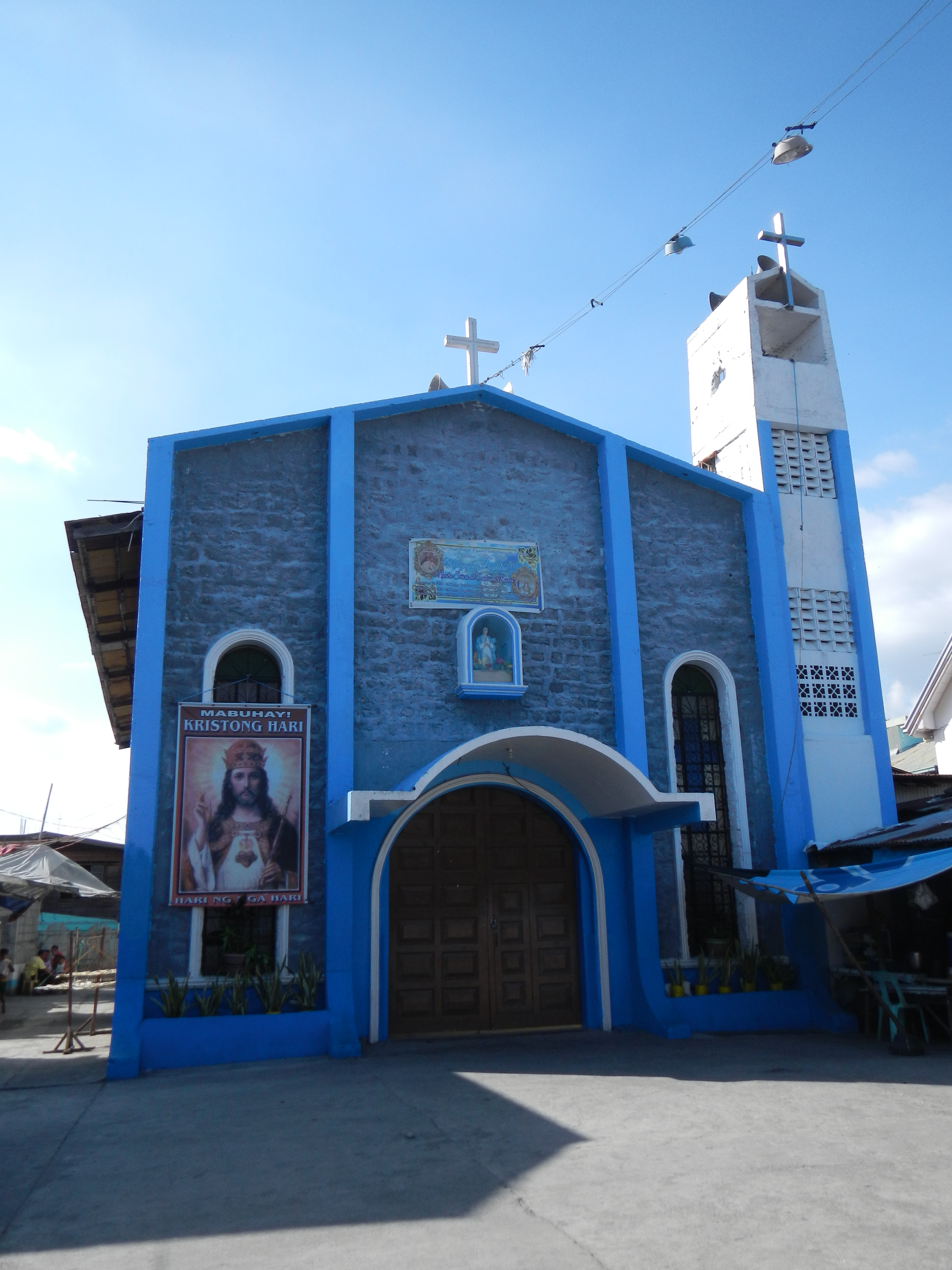
Sub-Parish Church of Virgen de los Remedios (Barangay Mercado)

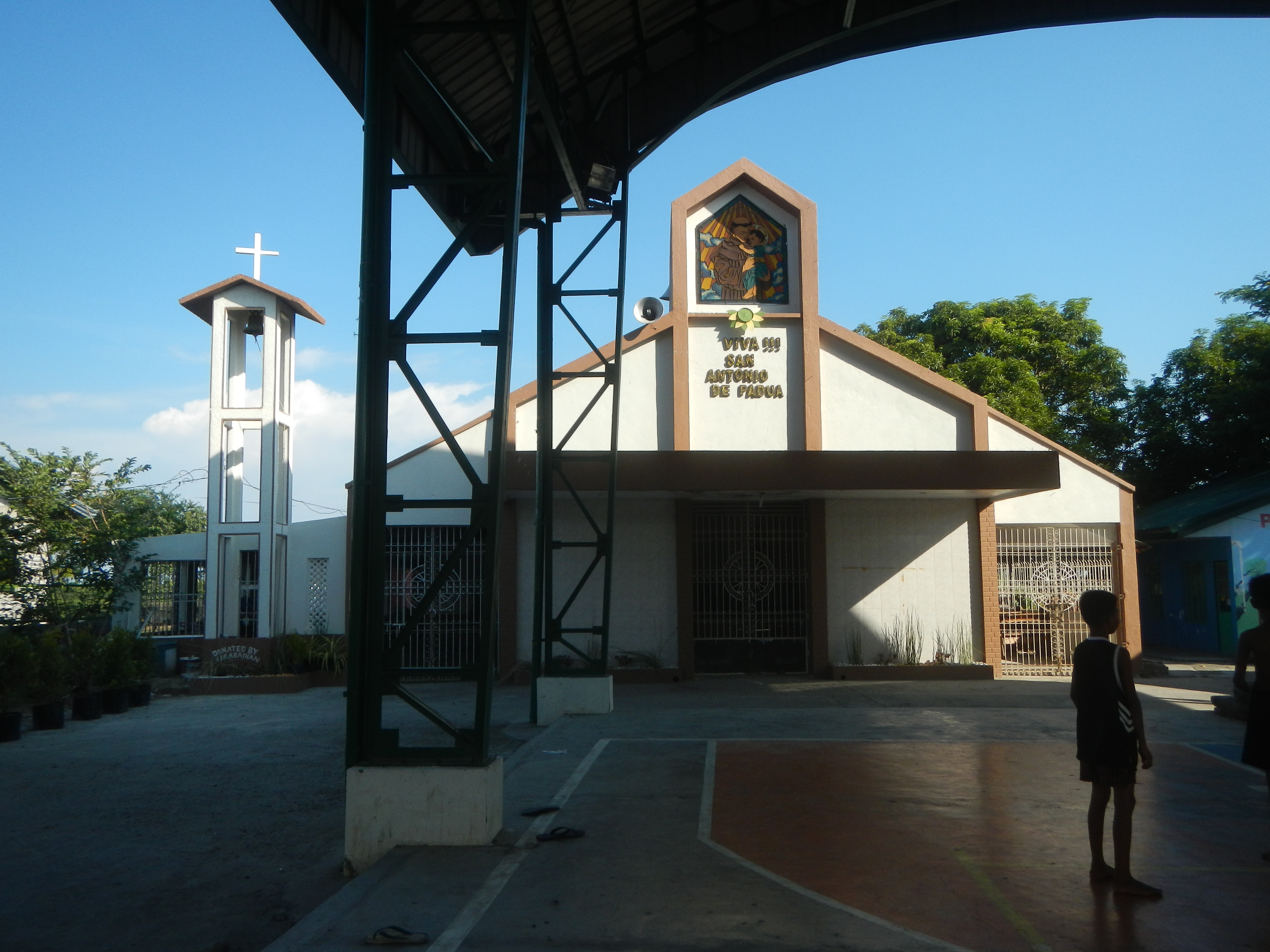
Sub-Parish Church of St. Anthony of Padua (Barangay Palapat)

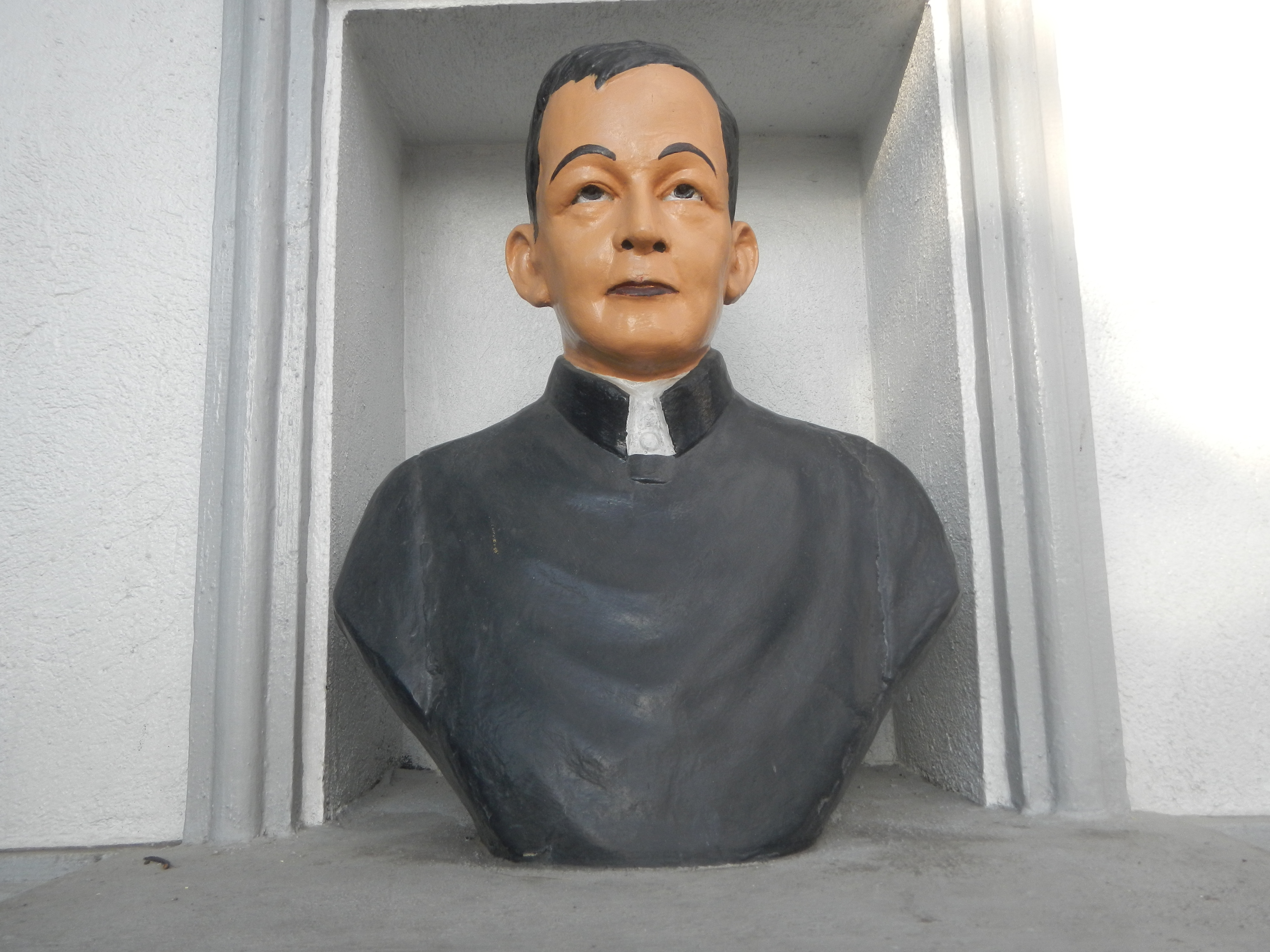
Rev. Fr. Celestino Rodriguez monument (Founder of St. Anne's Catholic School)

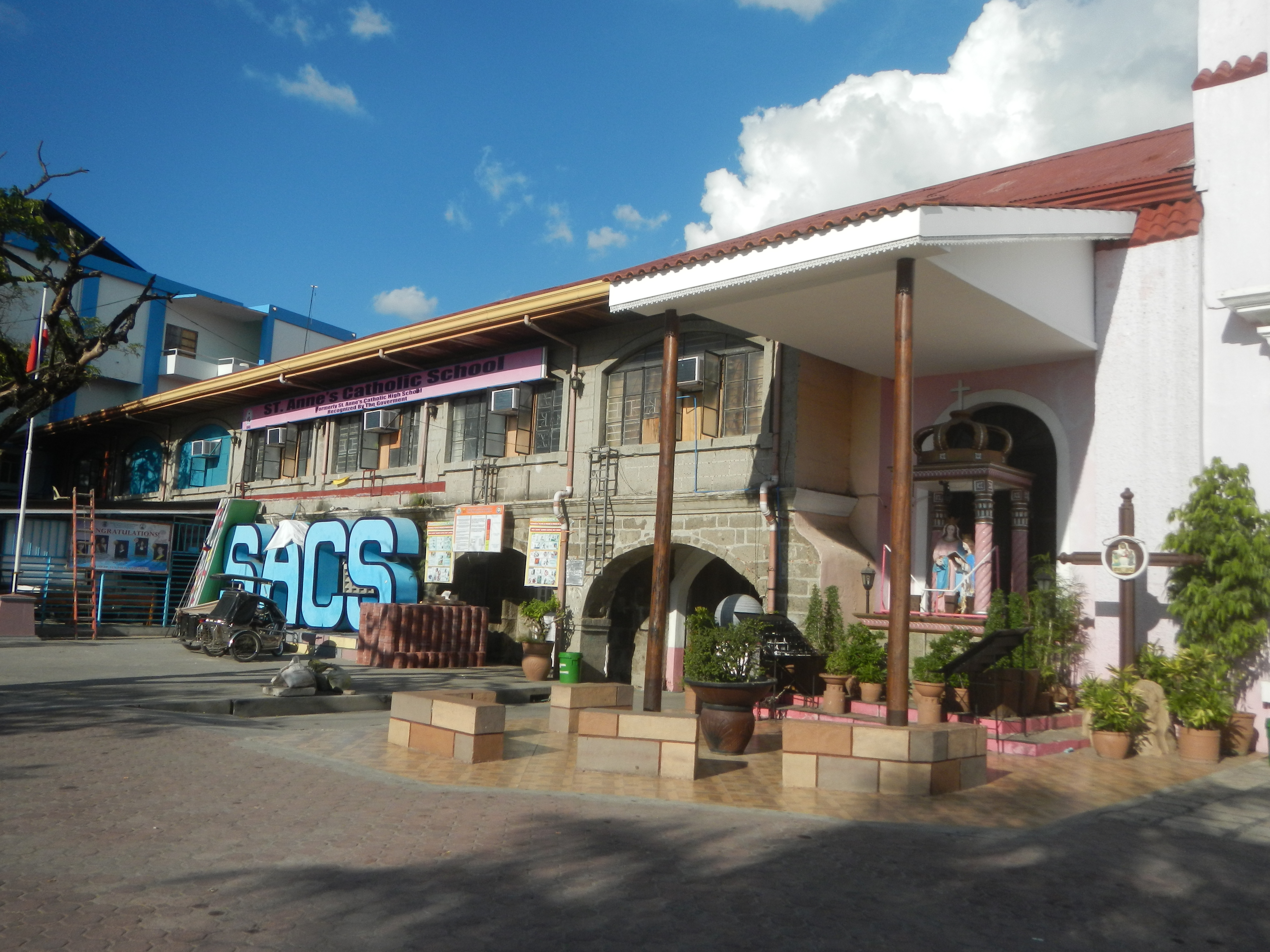
St. Anne's Catholic School

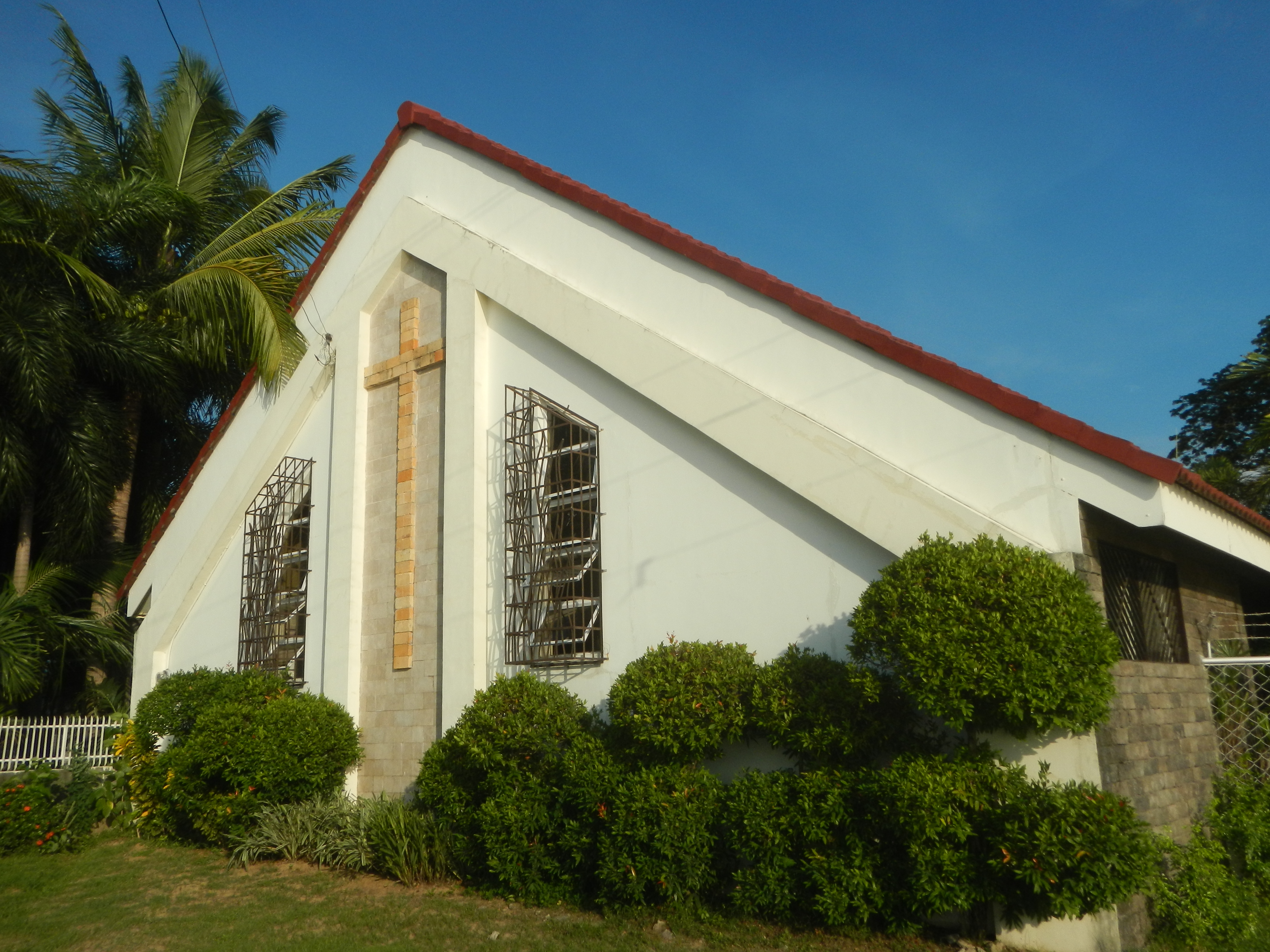
Sub-Parish Church of Jesus Nazareno (Barangay San Agustin)

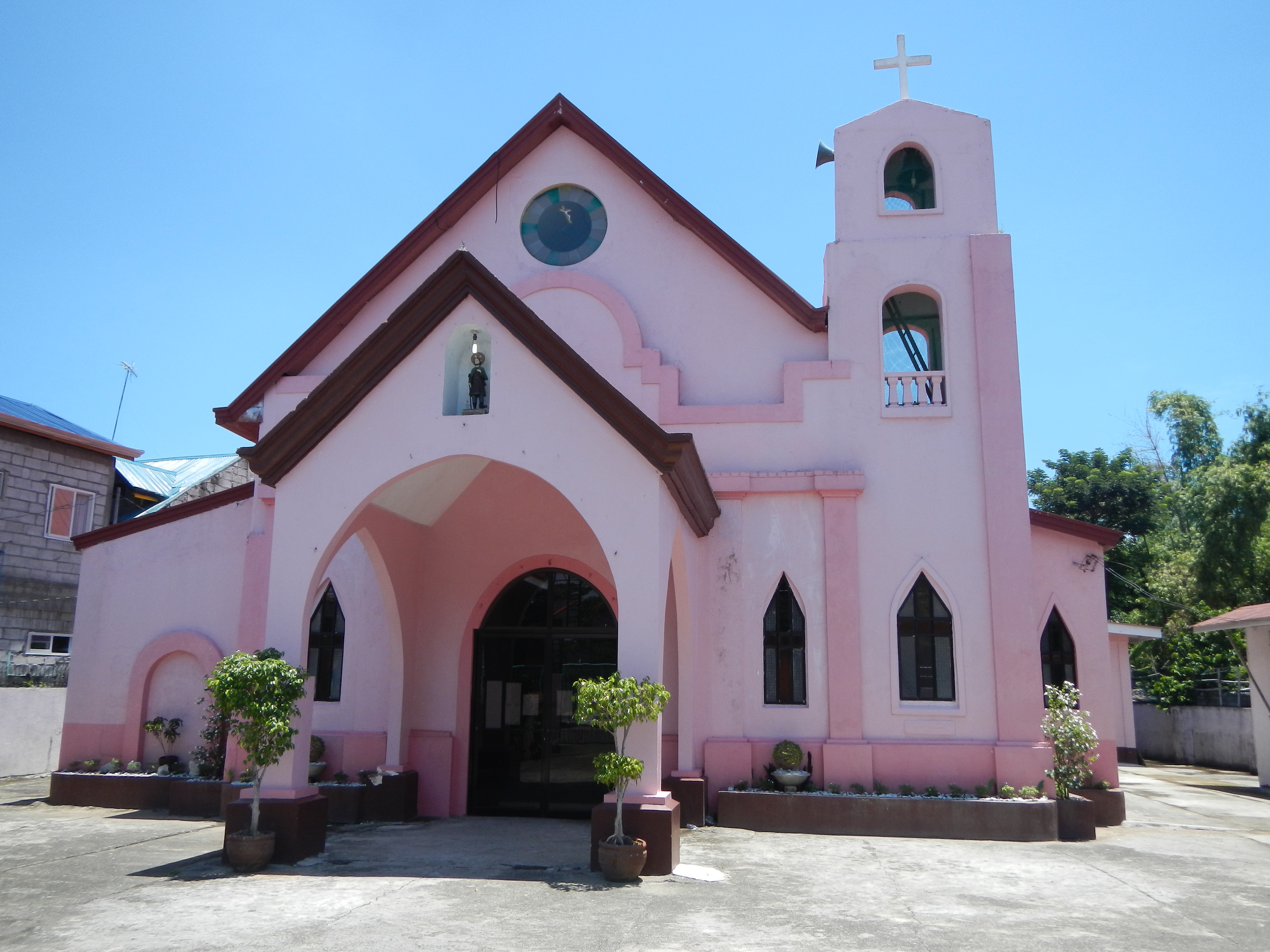
Sub-Parish Church of San Isidro

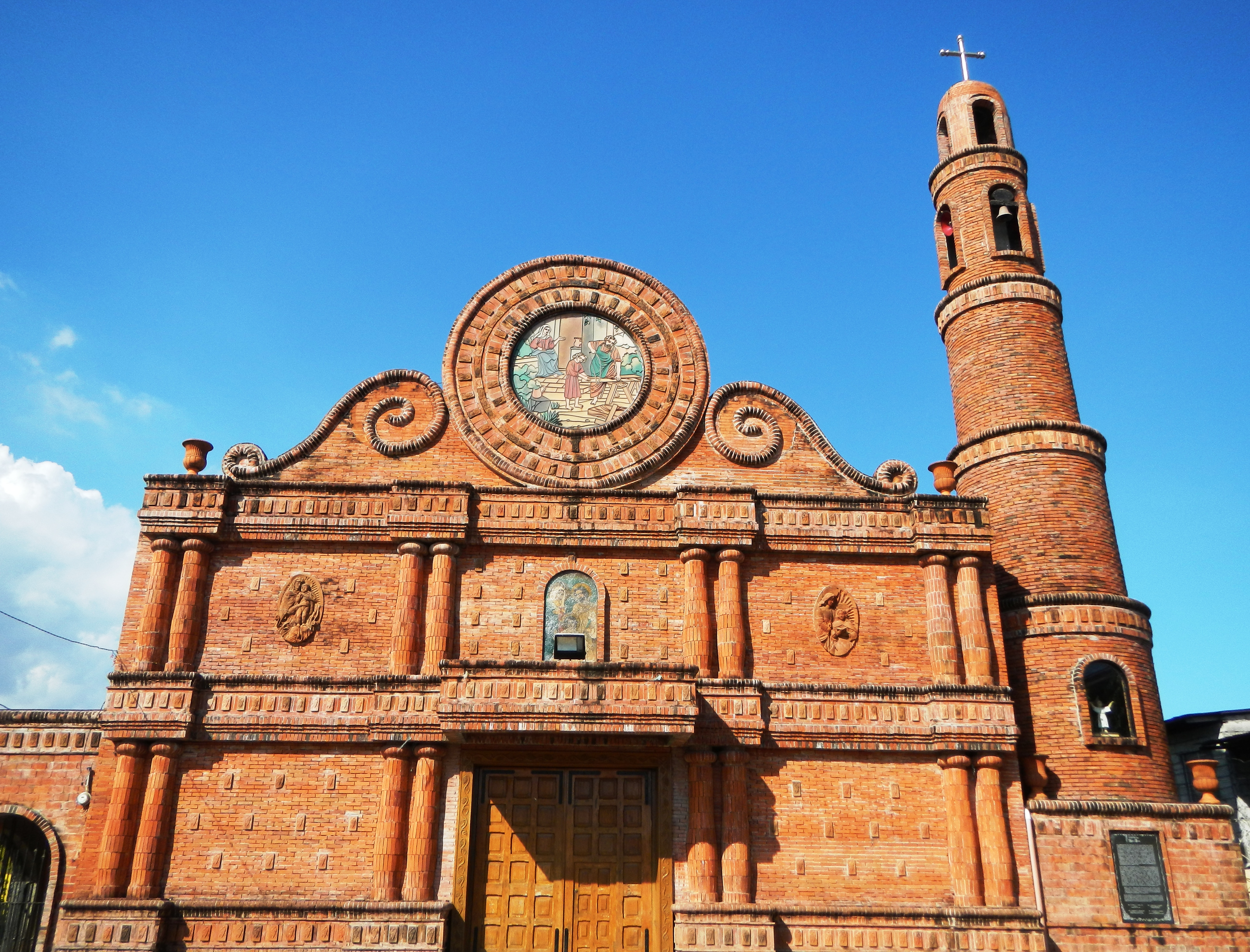
Sub-Parish Church of San Jose

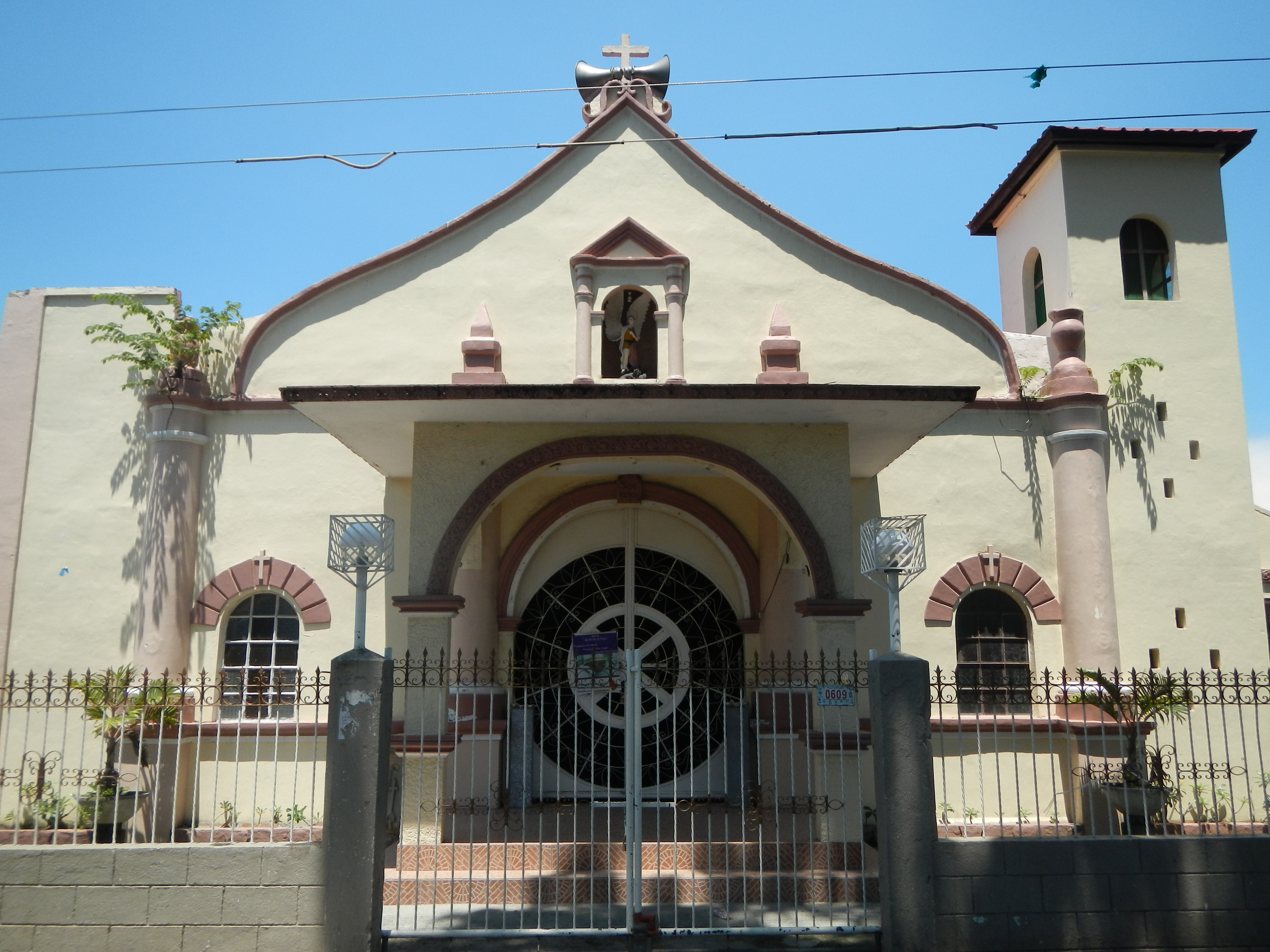
Sub-Parish Church of San Miguel

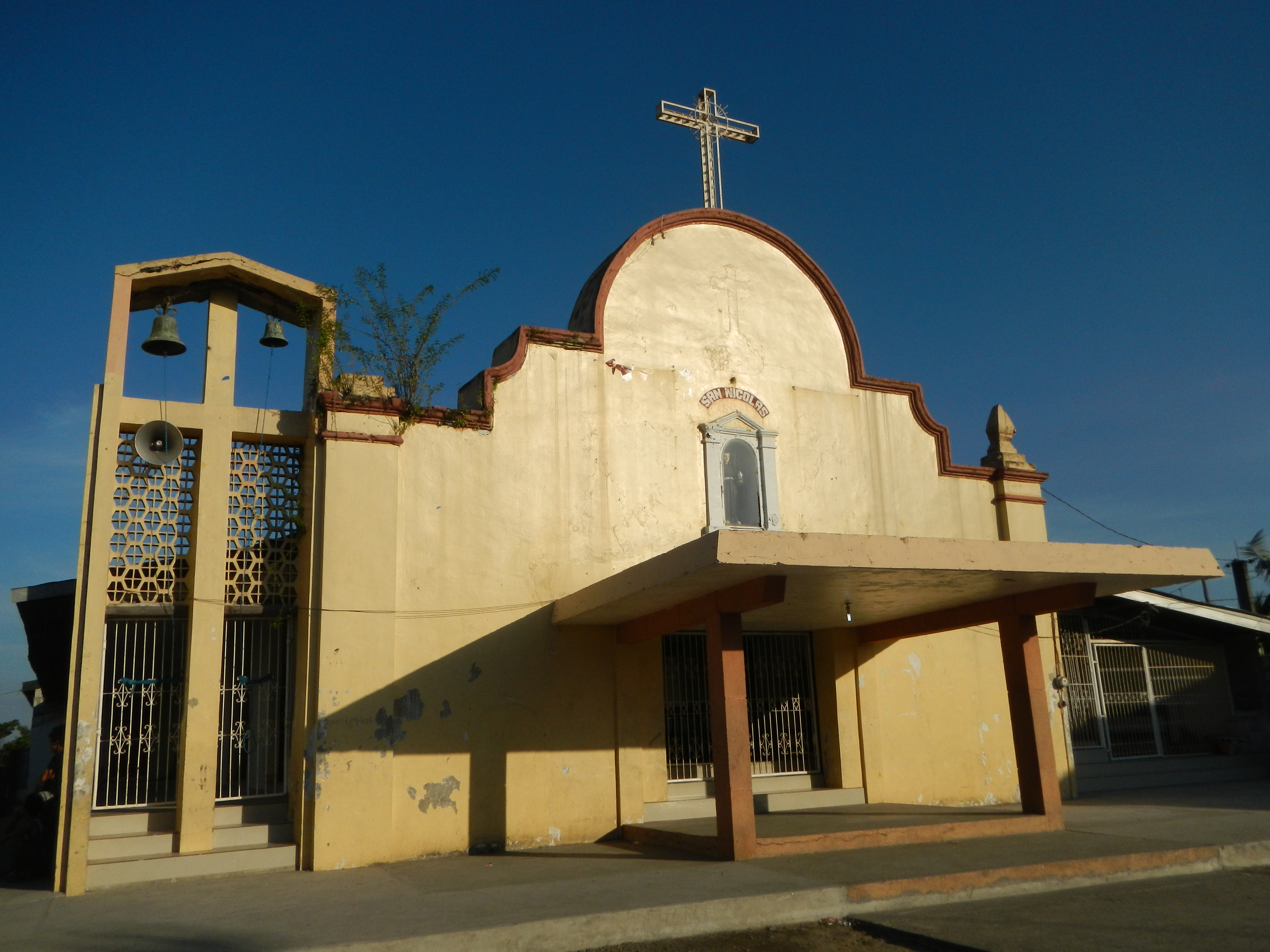
Sub-Parish Church of St. Nicholas of Tolentino

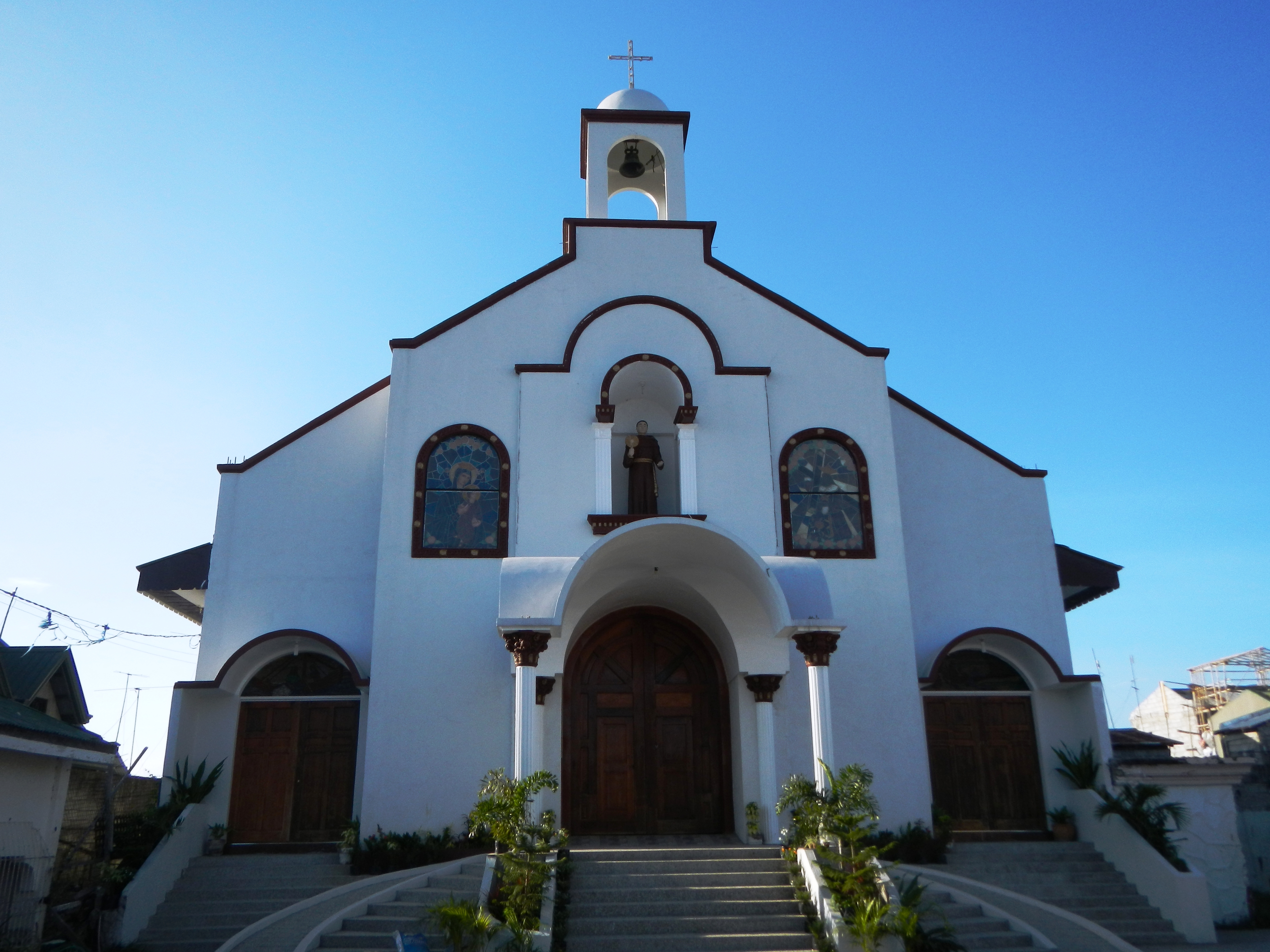
Sub-Parish Church of San Pascual

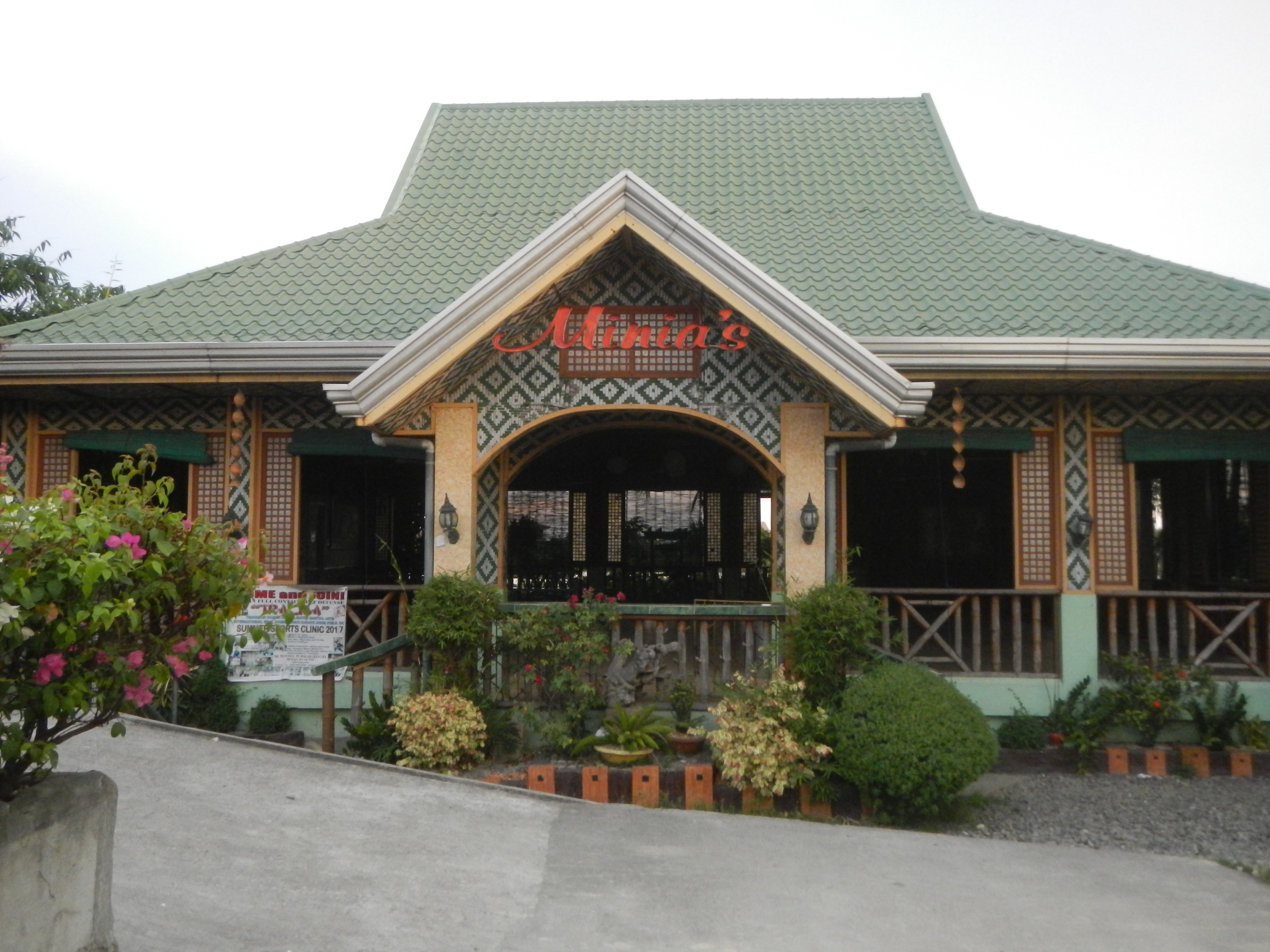
Minia's Kainan at Meriendahan (Barangay San Pedro)

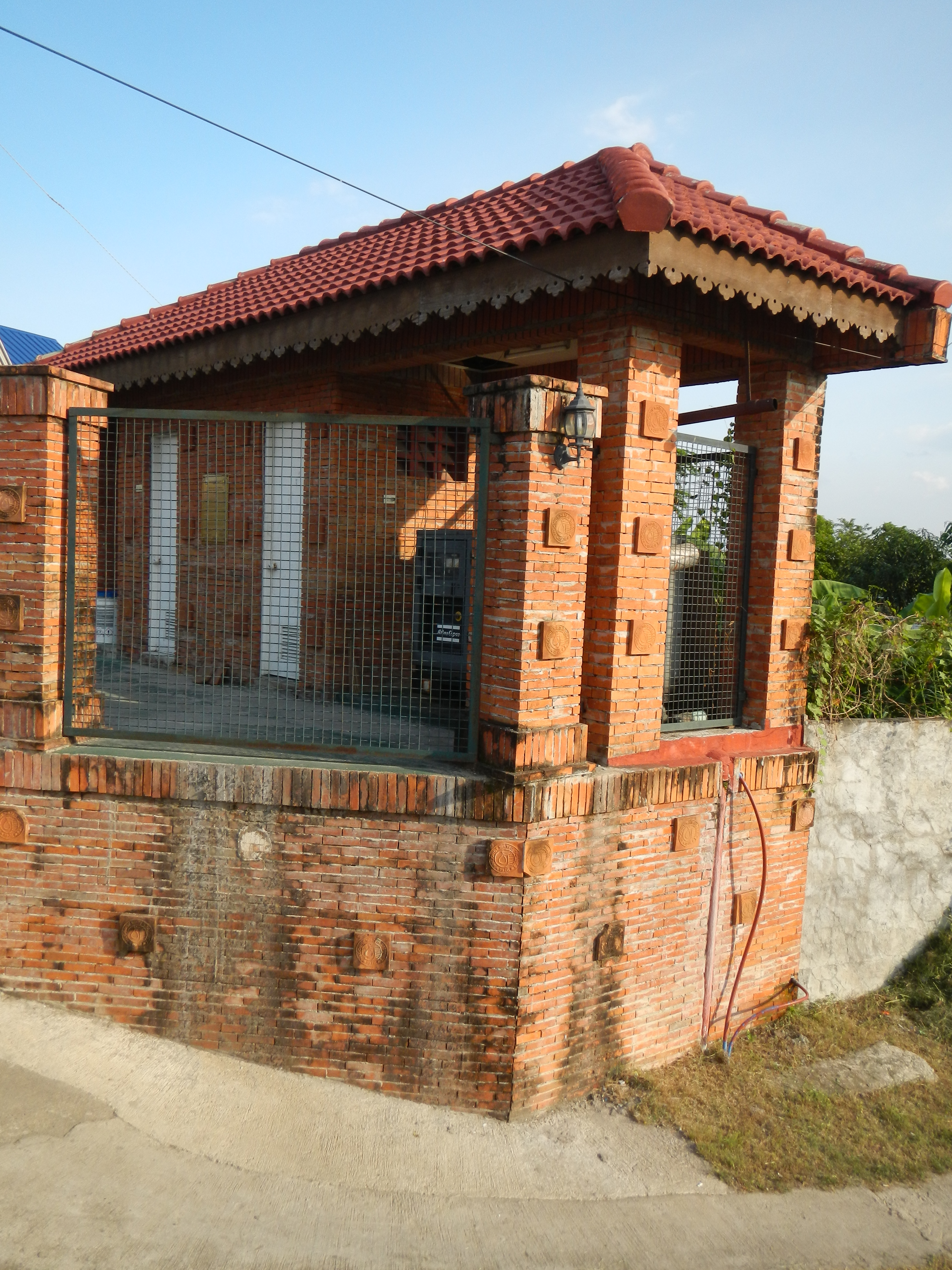
Engr. Manuel R. Contreras Memorial Production Center - Hagonoy Water District

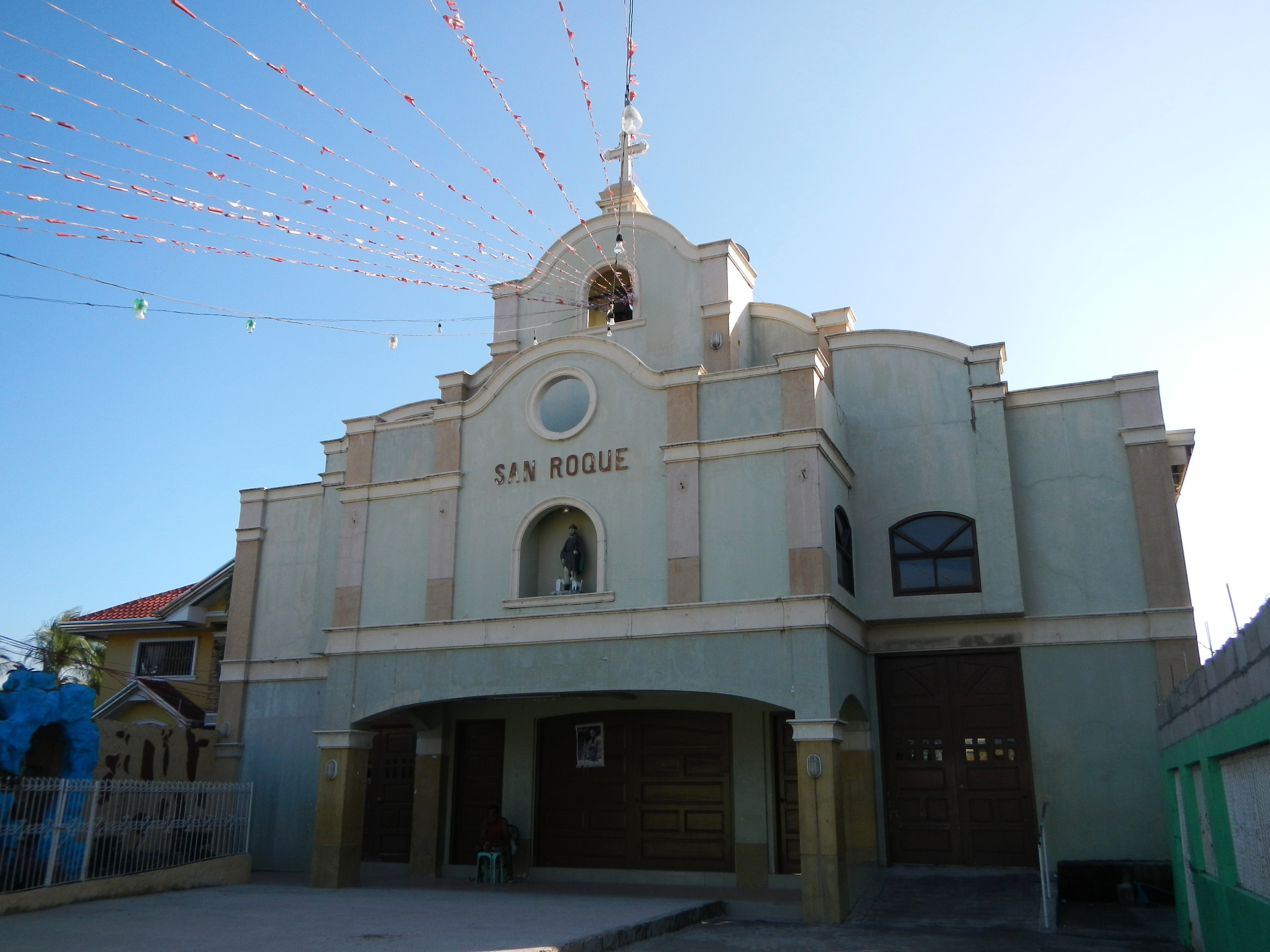
Sub-Parish Church of San Roque

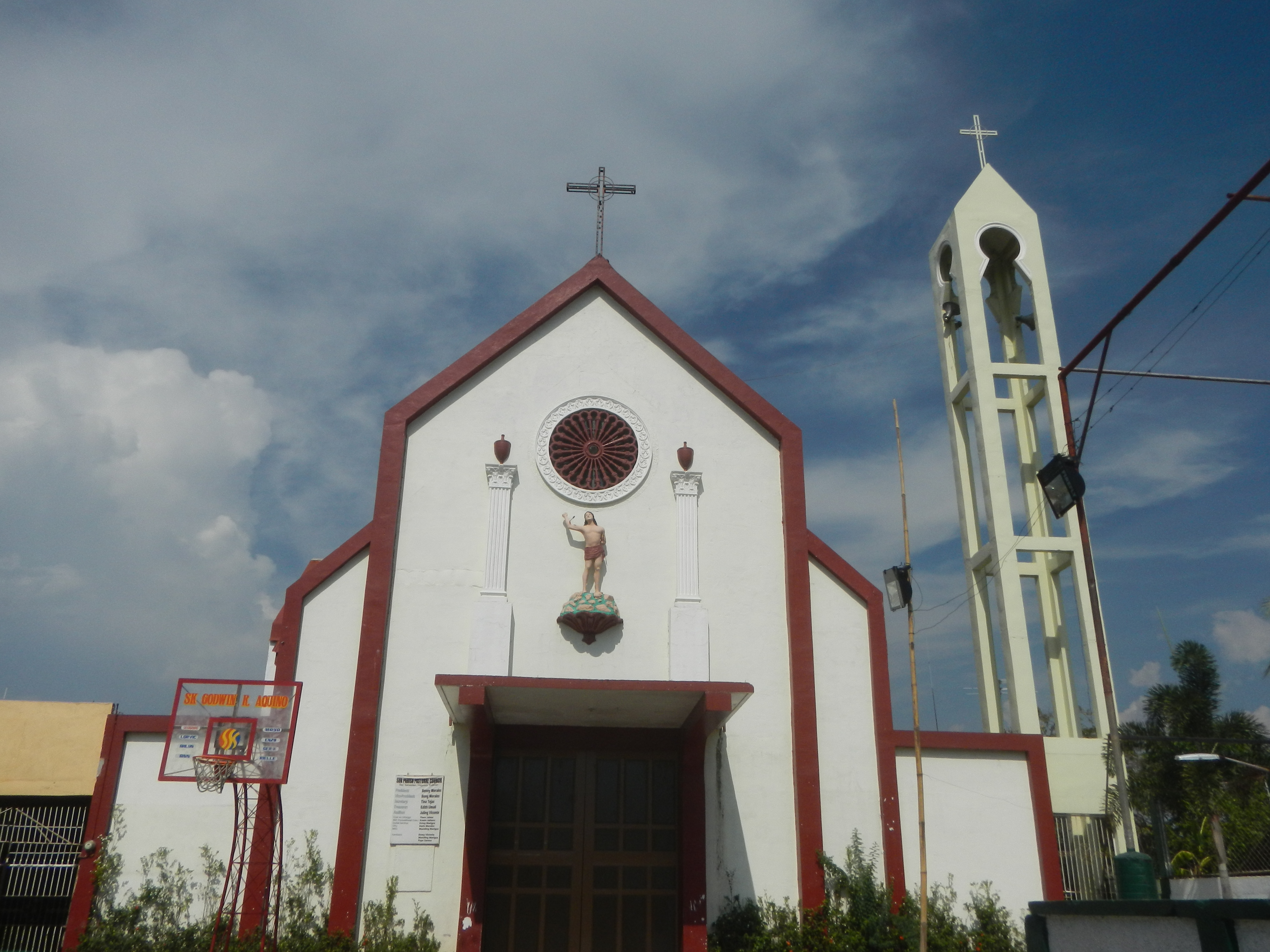
Sub-Parish Church of San Sebastian

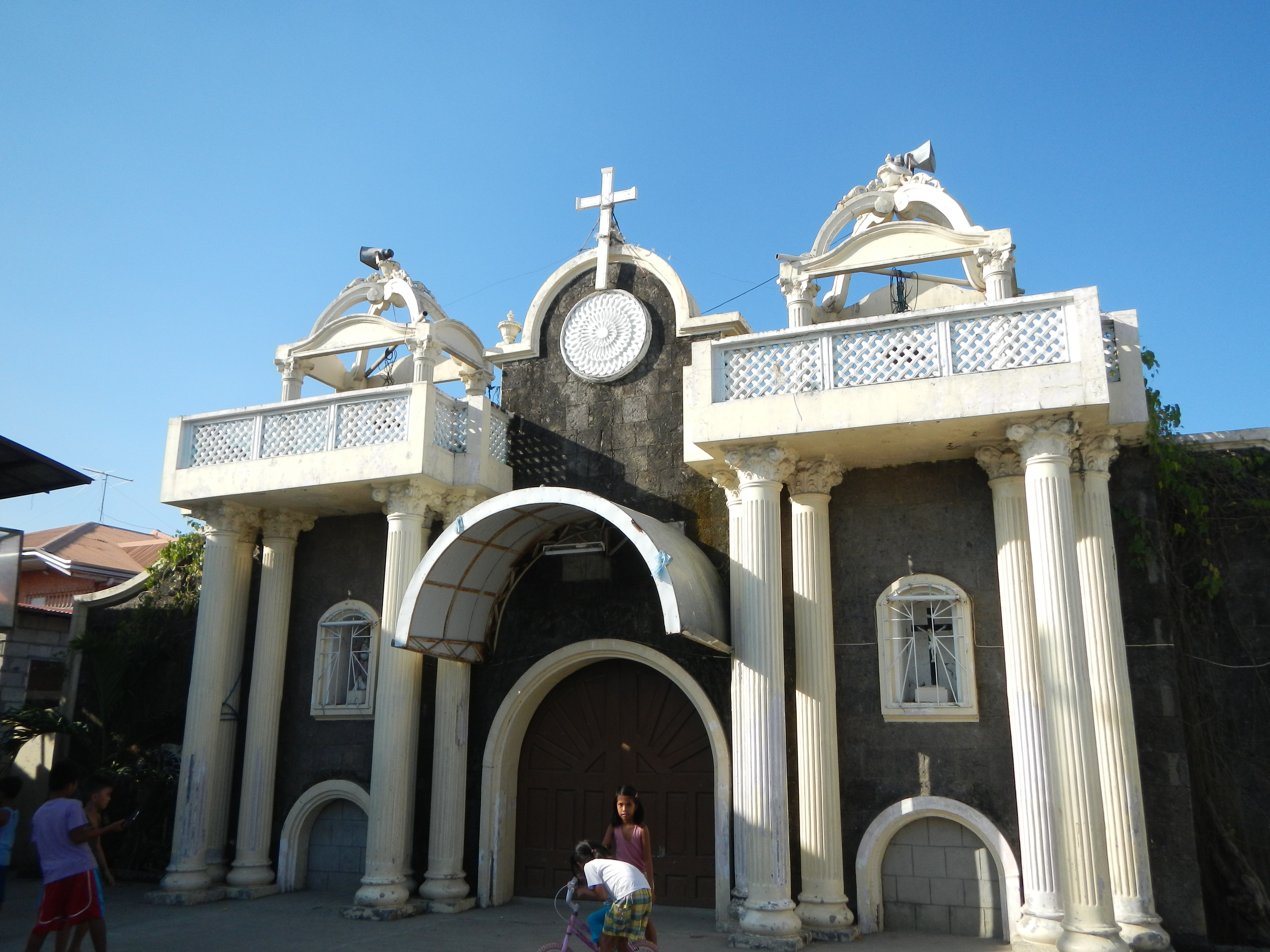
Sub-Parish Church of Santa Cruz

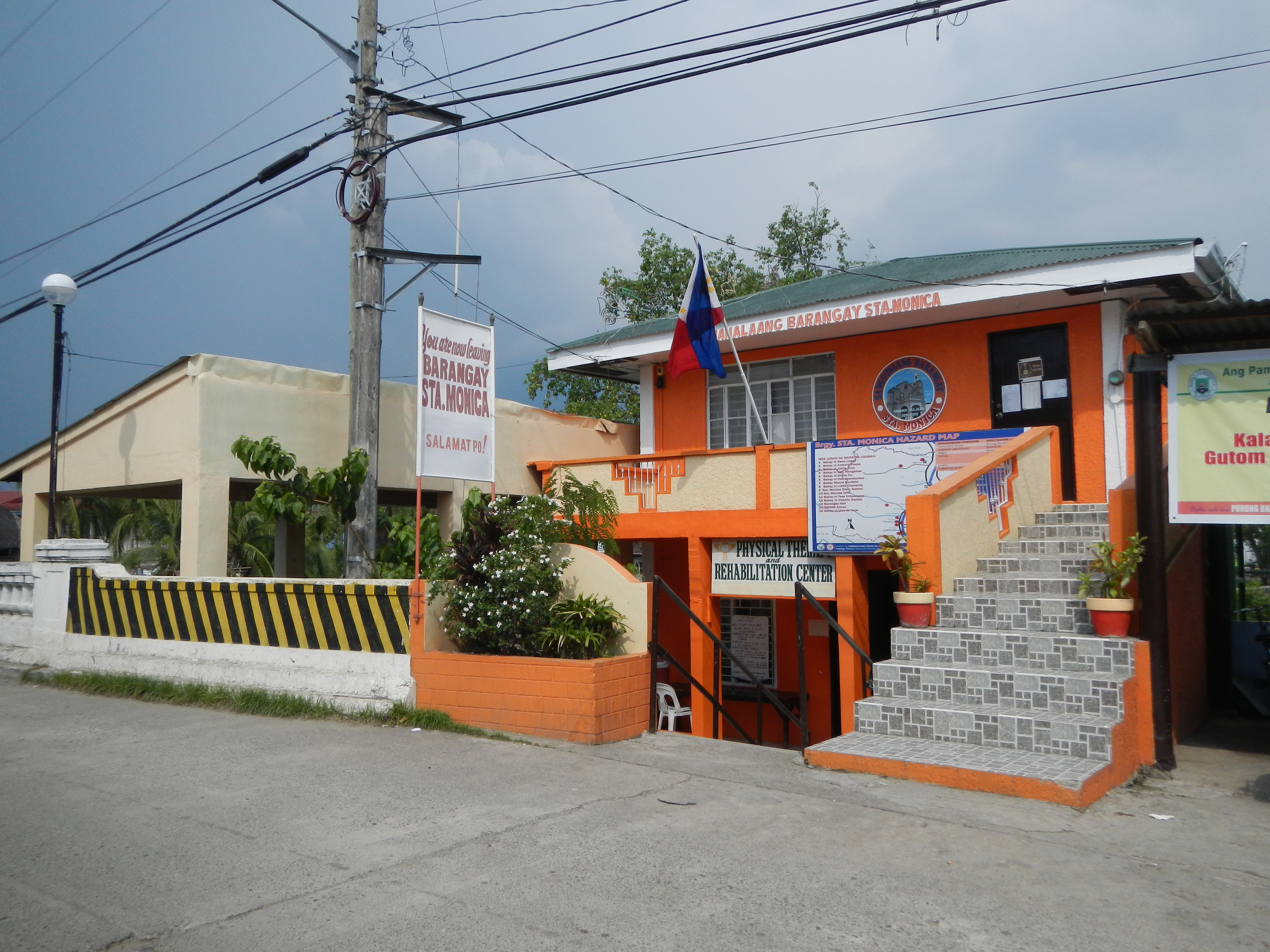
Santa Monica Barangay Hall

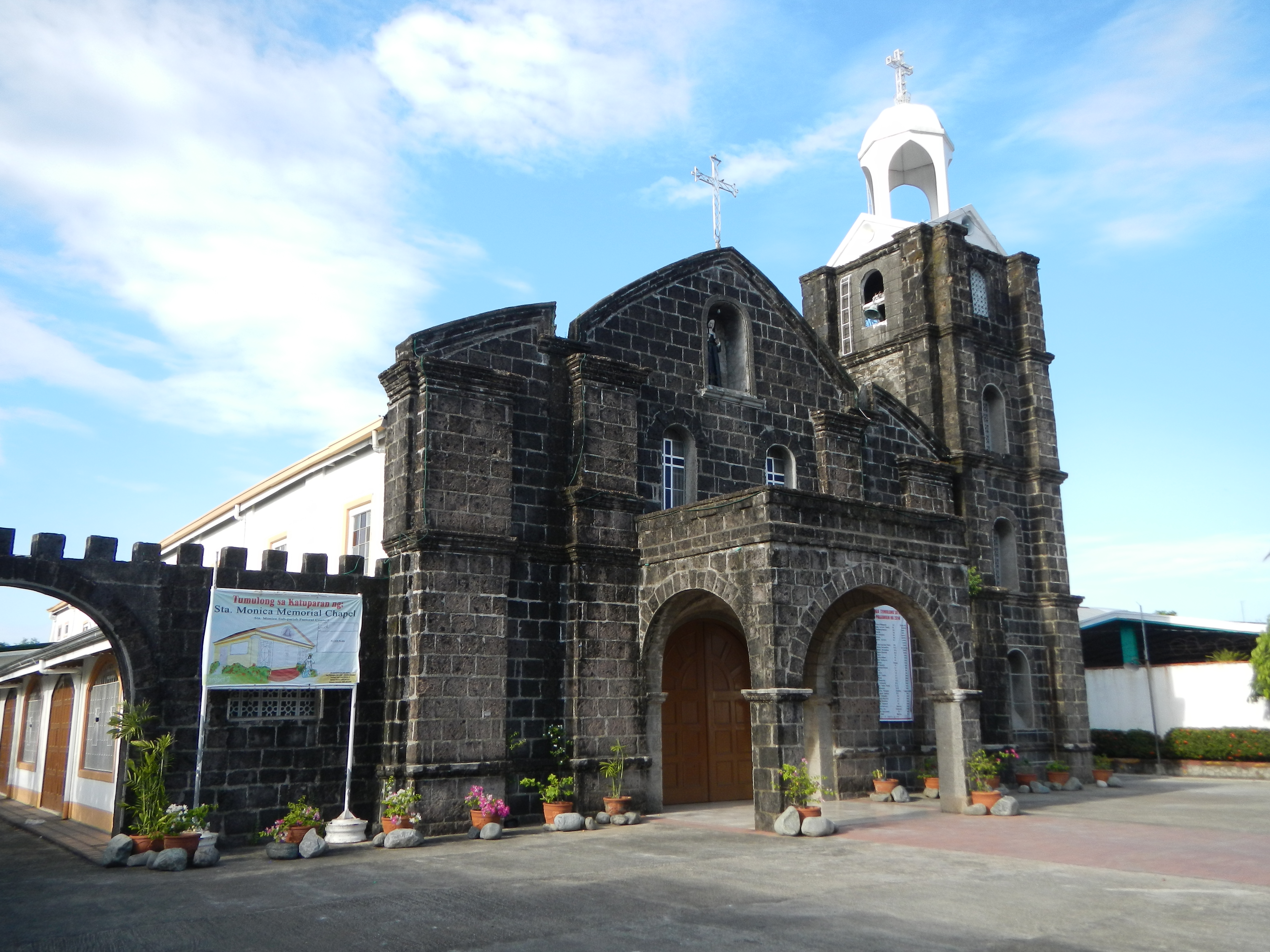
Sub-Parish Church of Santa Monica

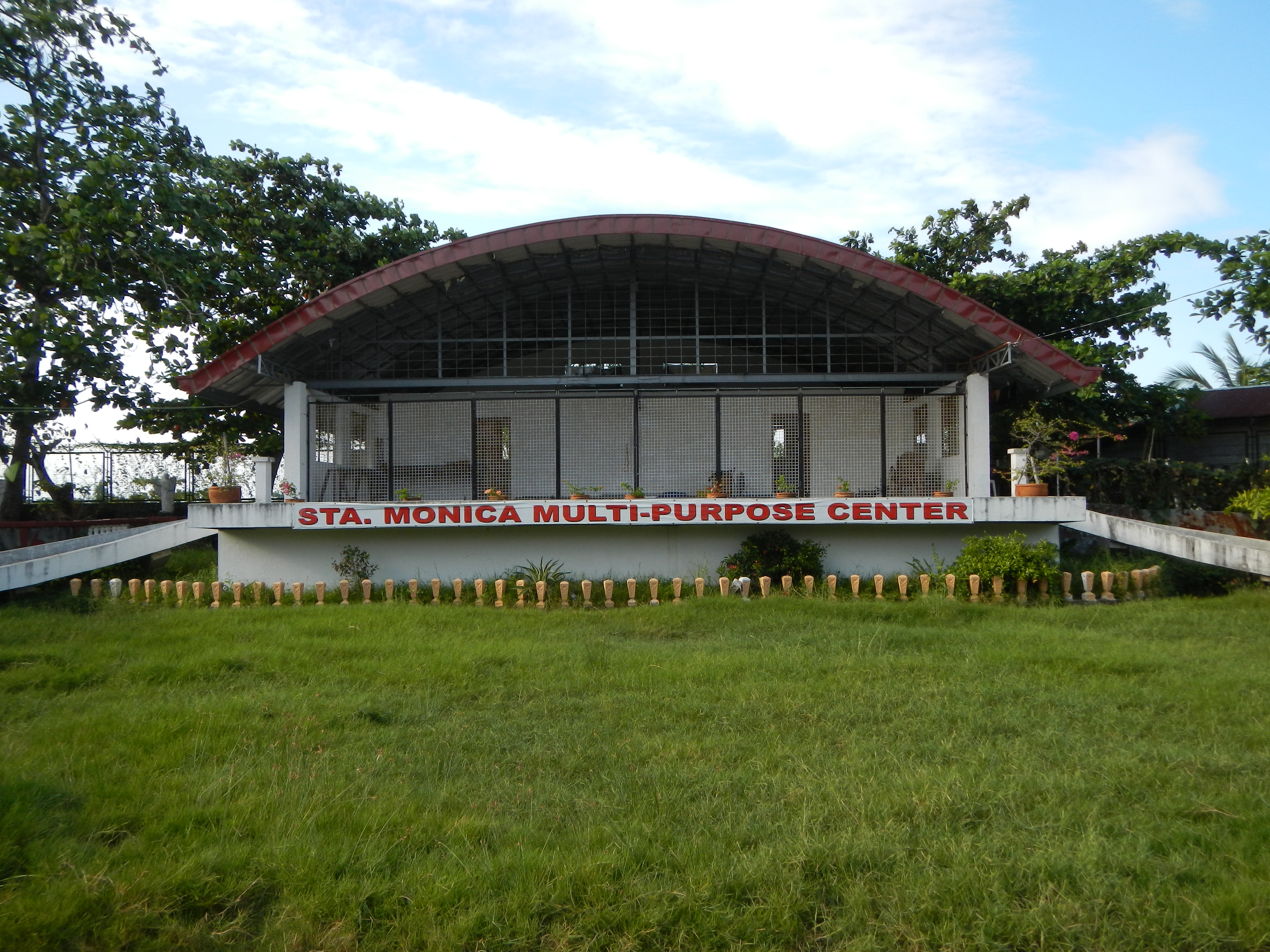
Santa Monica Multi-purpose Center

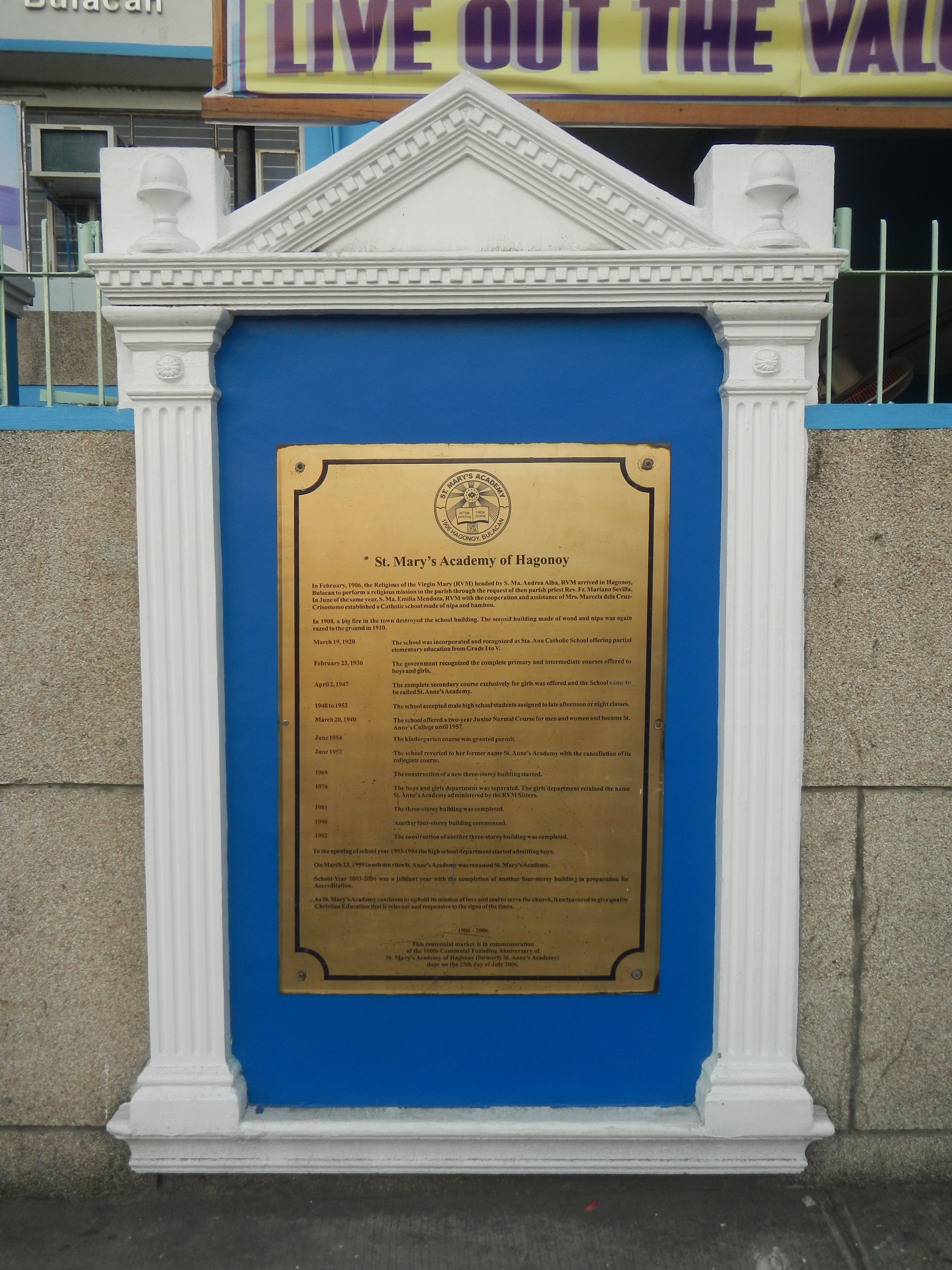
St. Mary's Academy of Hagonoy Centennial Marker

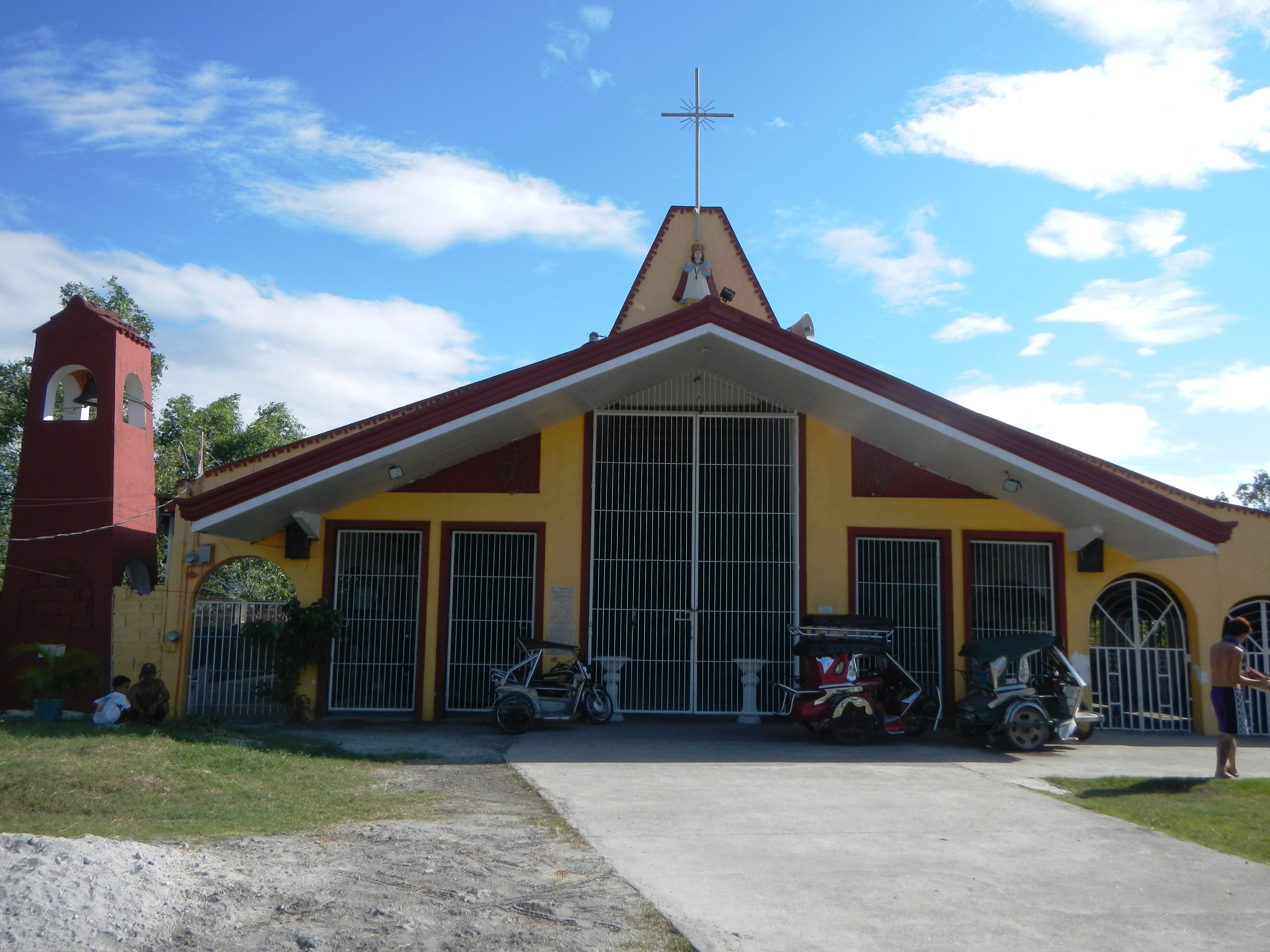
Sub-Parish Church of Santo Niño
