= List of student newspapers =

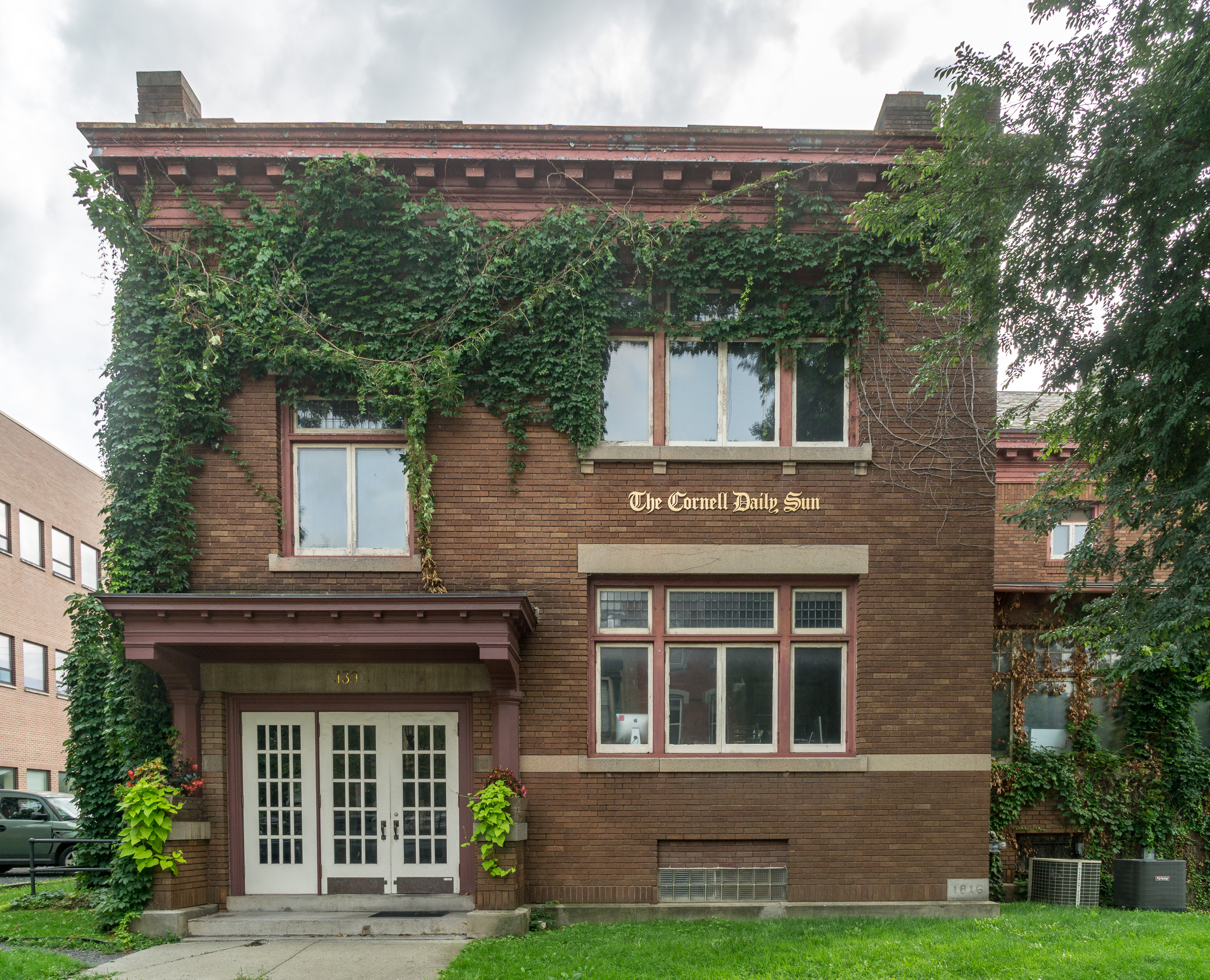
The headquarters of The Cornell Daily Sun, founded in 1880 at Cornell University, the oldest continuously published college student newspaper in the United States

The following is a list of the world's student newspapers, including school, college, and university newspapers separated by countries and, where appropriate, states or provinces:

== Albania ==
- University of Tirana – Reporteri

== Argentina ==
- University of Buenos Aires – La Res Publica

== Armenia ==
American University of Armenia – The Bridge

== Austria ==
=== Vienna ===
- Webster University Vienna – Jugendstil newspaper
- Universität für Bodenkultur Wien – ÖH_Magazin
- Universität Graz – Libelle

== Belgium ==
- Ghent University – Schamper
- University of Antwerp – dwars
- Katholieke Universiteit Leuven – Veto
- Vrije Universiteit Brussel – De Moeial
- Hogeschool Gent – BOX

== Chile ==
- Colegio de la Preciosa Sangre de Pichilemu – CC.AA. C.P.S. (2010–13)
- University of Chile – Bello Público

== Czech Republic ==
- Anglo-American University – Lennon Wall
- University of New York in Prague – Perception

== Egypt ==
- The Insider Student Newspaper – The Insider Student Newspaper
- The German University in Cairo (GUC) – The Insider GUC
- The American University in Cairo (AUC) – Caravan
- The American University in Cairo (AUC) – The Independent
- The Canadian International College (CIC) – The Insider CIC

== Finland ==
=== Helsinki ===
- University of Helsinki – Ylioppilaslehti
- Helsinki School of Economics – Kylteri
- Helsinki University of Technology – Polyteekkari

=== Turku ===
- University of Turku – Turun ylioppilaslehti

=== Tampere ===
- University of Tampere – Aviisi

== India ==
=== Aligarh, Uttar Pradesh ===
- Aligarh Muslim University – AMU Journal is an independent, student and alumni-run educational community and media organization based at Aligarh Muslim University started by Hashim Azmi in 2016

=== Rourkela, Odisha ===
- NIT Rourkela – Monday Morning – The Official e-newsletter of NIT Rourkela and accredited as the second largest student media body of India

=== Ahmedabad, Gujarat ===
- The School Post, Published by Times Communication is the first independent monthly newspaper for school children.

=== Raipur, Chhattisgarh ===
- The Bucket List – Independent Students Magazine of Chhattisgarh

=== Kanpur, Uttar Pradesh ===
- Harcourt Butler Technical University – Fortnightly students newsletter The Pulse of HBTU, (Printed form)

=== Varanasi, Uttar Pradesh ===
- Banaras Hindu University (BHU) – Mrigtrishna Magazine

World's First Mobile Run Magazine Editor-in-chief – Prince Tiwari

=== Mussoorie, Uttarakhand ===
- The Woodstocker – The official online student newspaper of Woodstock School, established in 2017 after a shift from the student print publication, "The Tiger."

=== Dehradun, Uttarakhand ===
- The Doon School Weekly – Official newspaper of The Doon School. Established in 1936, it is the oldest publication of Doon.
- Unison Times – Official campus newspaper of IMS Unison University.

=== New Delhi, Delhi ===
- Spotlight -NIT Delhi Official Newsletter of National Institute Of Technology Delhi
- Campus Crunch Magazine – Nationwide College magazine, By Students For Students
- Campus Drift – The first Students' newspaper of India Dedicated to Students reaching Colleges each month.
- DUBeat.com – Delhi University Independent Online Student Newspaper
- The Jamia Review – Jamia Millia Islamia University's Independent Media/News Organization managed exclusively by students.
- NSIT – The Alliance Independent Online Student Newspaper
- TAF Times – The Delhi TAF Times Independently run monthly Student Newspaper
- DTU Times- DTU Times Official newsletter of DTU
- Spaced Out – Official student magazine of School of Planning and Architecture, New Delhi.
- DU Assassins – Delhi University Student Newspaper

=== Manipal, Karnataka state ===
- Manipal University The Manipal Journal (abbreviated as TMJ) Independent student-run news website

=== Indore, Madhya Pradesh ===
- Goonj – A Daily Newspaper by The Students of India

=== Bhopal, Madhya Pradesh ===
- The Campionite– Official Monthly Newspaper of The Campion School Bairagarh

=== Mumbai, Maharashtra State ===
- Fergusson College – The Ninth Wave
- IIT Bombay – INSIGHT – The Third Eye
- Sydenham College – SPEAK (A-Mag Presentation)
- Somaiya Vidyavihar – VOICES – Your Word, Our Paper
- VJTI, Mumbai – VJ.News – The Official VJTI Newsletter

=== Chandigarh, Punjab ===
- PU Mirror, Panjab University
- PU Pulse, Panjab University

=== Trivandrum, Kerala ===
- The Sounding Rocket, Indian Institute of Space Science and Technology

=== Malappuram, Kerala ===
- Chilamb, Ponnani – The newspaper is published annually by Art Cafe Club, MES Ponnani College

=== Chennai, Tamil Nadu ===
- IIT Madras – The Fifth Estate

=== Tiruchirappalli, Tamil Nadu ===
- NIT Tiruchirappalli – Feeds- The official college magazine and media house of NIT Trichy

=== Hyderabad ===
- Elyuxen, independent student-run newspaper Independent Student-run newspaper in Hyderabad, Warangal, Vijayawada, Tirupathi, Vizag, Chennai, Bangalore, Mumbai, Pune and Mysore

=== Pune, Maharashtra State ===
- Campus Times Pune, Students' News Blog & College Event Updates in Pune.
- TILT – The ILIKE Times, Pune's First Independent Student Tabloid
- The College Times – The Students Voice Platform.

=== Kolkata, West Bengal ===
- Jadavpur University-"The JU Journal"

=== Kharagpur, West Bengal ===
- IIT Kharagpur – The Scholars' Avenue

=== Haldia, West Bengal ===
- Haldia Institute of Technology – The HIT Times

=== Srinagar, Jammu and Kashmir ===
- University of Kashmir – The Student Herald

=== Northeast India ===
- Wesean High School Students Forum – The Wesean Times

== Indonesia ==
- Andalas University – UKPM Genta Andalas Universitas Andalas
- Yogyakarta State University – LPM EKSPRESI
- Satya Wacana Christian University – Scientiarum, E-Time
- Gadjah Mada University – BPPM Balairung
- State Institute for Islamic Studies – IDEA
- Universitas Kristen Petra – "GENTA-Petra"
- Brawijaya University Faculty of Social and Political Science – LPM Perspektif

== Iran ==
- "Ettefagh" Independent Student Journal – Islamic Azad University- Shahreza Branch Student Journal in Isfahan

== Iraq ==
- American University of Iraq, Sulaimani – AUIS Voice

== Ireland ==
- Ballyfermot College of Further Education – The Ballyfermot Post
- Dublin City University – Campus – Official DCUSU Magazine, The College View – Student Newspaper, Flashback – The semesterly review magazine for DCU, St. Patrick's and Mater Dei.
- National University of Ireland
  - University College Cork – UCC Express and Motley Magazine
  - University College Dublin – The University Observer and The College Tribune
  - University of Galway – Sin Newspaper
  - Maynooth University – The Print
- Trinity College Dublin – Trinity News, The University Times
- University College Cork
  - UCC Express
- University of Limerick – An Focal

== Italy ==
- Bocconi University – Tra i Leoni

== Japan ==
- Keio University – Mita Campus
- Chuo University Hakumon Herald
- Tokyo City University TCU Press

== Jordan ==
- Jordan University of Science and Technology – Just For Just

== Lebanon ==
- American University of Beirut – Outlook

== Malta ==
- University of Malta – The Insiter

== Malaysia ==
- International Islamic University Malaysia – IIUMToday
- Universiti Teknologi MARA – Dimensi

== Nepal ==
- BNKS Chronicle – Official school newspaper of Budhanilkantha school. Established in 2023.

== Netherlands ==
- University of Amsterdam – Rostra Economica
- University of Amsterdam – The Amsterdammer

== New Zealand ==
- Auckland University of Technology – Debate
- University of Auckland – Craccum
- University of Canterbury – Canta
- Lincoln University – Caclin
- Massey University, Palmerston North campus – Chaff
- Massey University, Albany campus – Satellite
- Massey University, Wellington campus – Magneto
- Otago Polytechnic – Gyro
- University of Otago – Critic Te Ārohi
- Unitec – In Unison
- Universal College of Learning – Crew
- Victoria University of Wellington – Salient
- Waikato University – Nexus

See also Aotearoa Student Press Association

== North Macedonia ==
- International Balkan University – WeeklyBalkan

== Norway ==
=== Oslo ===
- University of Oslo – Universitas
- Oslo katedralskole – Kort Sagt

=== Trondheim ===
- Norwegian University of Science and Technology – Under dusken

=== Tromsø ===
- University of Tromsø – Utropia

=== Bergen ===
- University of Bergen – Studvest

== China ==
- China West Normal University – XiHua Online

=== Hong Kong ===
- Chinese University of Hong Kong – Student Press (中大學生報)
- University of Hong Kong – HKU Post (港大報)
- University of Hong Kong – Undergrad (學苑)
- Hong Kong University of Science and Technology – Wings (振翅)
- Hong Kong Polytechnic University – PolyLife
- City University of Hong Kong – City Print

== Pakistan ==
- Institute of Business Administration, Karachi, IBA Today

== Philippines ==
=== Metro Manila ===
- Adamson University – Adamson News, Ugnayan, The Adamson Chronicle, The Sentinel
- Arellano University – The Standard (Jose Rizal Campus)
- Ateneo de Manila University – The Palladium (Law School), The GUIDON, (Loyola Schools), Matanglawin (Loyola Schools), Hi-Lites (High School) and The Eaglet (Grade School)
- Calauag Central College Inc. - Ang Junior Torch
- Claret School of Quezon City – Tanglaw, Claretian
- Colegio de San Juan de Letran – The LANCE
- De La Salle Araneta University – TINIG
- De La Salle College of Saint Benilde – The Benildean
- De La Salle University Manila – The LaSallian, Ang Pahayagang Plaridel, Malate Literary Folio, Green & White
- Emilio Aguinaldo College – MAGDALO Editorial Board (College), The Magdalo Jr. (High School)
- Eulogio "Amang" Rodriguez Institute of Science and Technology – EARIST Technozette
- Far Eastern University – FEU Advocate
- José Rizal University - The Journal
- Lyceum of the Philippines University – '
- Mapúa University – The New Builder
- Mater Carmeli School – The Carmelian
- Miriam College – Chi Rho Publications
- National University (Philippines) – The National
- National Teachers College – Fiat Lux
- New Era University – Hudyat
- Pamantasan ng Lungsod ng Marikina – CPAIPS: Center for Public Affairs, Information and Publication Services, The PLMar Tribune and Hayag Publications
- Pamantasan ng Lungsod ng Maynila – Ang Pamantasan
- Pamantasan ng Lungsod ng Muntinlupa – The Warden Publication
- Philippine Normal University – The Torch
- Philippine State College of Aeronautics VAB Campus – Aeronautica
- Polytechnic University of the Philippines – The Catalyst, The Communicator (College of Communication), The Solicitor (College of Law), The Vanguard (College of Political Science and Public Administration), The Limestone (College of Education)
- Polytechnic University of the Philippines Taguig – The Chronicler
- Quezon City Science High School – The Electron, Ang Banyuhay
- Rizal Technological University – The Guardian
- San Beda College Alabang – The Bedan Herald
- San Beda University – The Bedan
- San Beda University – College of Nursing – The Bedan Lamp
- San Sebastian College – Recoletos – The Sebastinian
- St. Scholastica's College Manila – The Scholastican, The Blue Flame, The Little Bluestockings
- Technological Institute of the Philippines – TIP Voice
- Technological University of the Philippines – The Philippine Artisan
- Trinity University of Asia – Trinity Observer
- Universidad de Manila – Ang Dalubhasa / La Universidad
- University of Asia and the Pacific – The Bosun
- University of Makati – The Makati Collegian
- University of Santo Tomas – The Varsitarian, The Flame
- University of the East – The Dawn
- University of the Philippines Diliman – The Philippine Collegian
- University of the Philippines Manila – The Manila Collegian

=== Provincial ===
- Alimodian – Blue Staedler, The Morning Sun (Elementary), The Hillside Echoes and Ali Mudin (High School)
- Ateneo de Cebu – Seeds
- Ateneo de Davao University – Atenews (College), Blue Knight (High School) and Magis (Grade School)
- Ateneo de Iloilo – Ripples (High School) and Pebbles (Grade School)
- Ateneo de Naga University – The PILLARS (College), The Blue and Gold (High School)
- Ateneo de Zamboanga University – The Beacon (College), The Oculus (Senior High School), Vista de Aguila (Senior High School), The Blue Eagle (Junior High School) and The Quill (Grade School)
- Angeles University Foundation – The Pioneer
- Aquinas University of Legazpi – The Phoenix
- Araullo University – ViewPoint
- Baliuag University – Horizons
- Bataan Peninsula State University – The GUILDS (Main campus) The DEFENDER (Balanga campus) The POLYTECHNICIAN (Orani campus), Ang Malasimbo (Dinalupihan campus), The GOLDEN PLOW (Abucay campus), The HERON (Bagac campus)
- Bataan Heroes Memorial College – Ang BAYANI
- Batangas State University – The LATHE
- Benguet State University – The Mountain Collegian
- Bicol University of Legazpi – The Bicol Universitarian
- Bukidnon State University – The Collegianer
- Bulacan Agricultural State College – The Soil Tiller
- Bulacan State University – Pacesetter (College), The Busy Bee (High School)
- Camarines Norte State College – Breakthrough
- Capiz State University (Main Campus)
  - The Quest Publication (Main Publication )
  - The Ledger (College of Management Department )
  - Sulo Publication (College of Education Department )
  - Pundar Publication n (College of Engineering and Architecture )
- Cavite State University – The Gazette
- Cebu Institute of Technology – University – Techno (magazine) GearWatch (newsletter)
- Cebu Normal University – Ang Suga
- Cebu Technological University – The Nation Builder
- Central Bicol State University of Agriculture (CBSUA) – The STATEANS
- Central Philippine University – The Central Echo
- Colegio ng Lungsod ng Batangas – CLIMB
- De La Salle Lipa – Lavoxa
- De La Salle University Dasmariñas – Heraldo Filipino
- Don Honorio Ventura Technological State University – The Industrialist
- First Asia Institute of Technology and Humanities – The New Lighthouse
- Filamer Christian University – The Hillside Echo
- Gordon College – The Forefront
- Holy Angel University – The Angelite
- Iloilo Science and Technology University – The Technovator
- La Consolacion University Philippines – Truth Courier
- La Salle University (Ozamiz) – Tingog
- Laguna State Polytechnic University (Los Baños) – The Baybreeze
- Laguna State Polytechnic University (Santa Cruz) – The Gears
- Laguna State Polytechnic University (San Pablo) – Technology Advocate
- Laguna State Polytechnic University (Siniloan) – The Baybay Granary
- La Verdad Christian College - The Torch, Ang Tanglaw, La Verdad Herald
- Leyte Normal University (Tacloban) – An Lantawan
- Lyceum of the Philippines University (Batangas) – Flambeau
- Lyceum of the Philippines University (Laguna) – Voyage
- Marinduque State University – The MSUians
- Mariano Marcos State University (City of Batac, Ilocos Norte) – SIRMATA
- Mindanao State University (General Santos) – BAGWIS
- Mindanao State University – Iligan Institute of Technology – Silahis (undergraduate) and The Nexus (College of Law – Iligan Extension)
- Mindanao State University (Marawi) – The Mindanao Varsitarian
- Negros Oriental State University – The NORSUnian
- Northern Iloilo State University – The Astrals
- Notre Dame of Jolo College – SULUHAN
- Notre Dame RVM-College of Cotabato (Cotabato)- Damyanista (Filipino), The Dame(English), Angel's Diary(Elementary)
- Nueva Ecija University of Science and Technology – The Blaze
- Palawan State University – Pioneer (College), Practupians (High School), Fresh Ink (Elementary)
- Partido State University – Radiance
- Polytechnic University of the Philippines Santo Tomas – The Searcher
- Ramon Magsaysay Technological University (Iba, Zambales) – The Bastion
- Romblon State University – The Harrow, The CAS Torch
- Saint Louis University (Philippines) – White and Blue
- Saint Mary's University (Philippines) – The MARIAN
- Saint Michael's College of Laguna – The Michaelean Herald
- San Beda University – Little Bedan (Grade School), Cub Recorder (Junior High School), Bedan Roar (Senior Highschool)
- San Pascual National High School (Batangas Province) – "The Bridge"
- Siena College of Taytay – The SCENE Today
- Silliman University – The Weekly Sillimanian
- Southern Luzon State University – The Kingfisher
- St. Paul University Philippines – The Paulinian (College), The Pauleen (High School), The Paulinette (Grade School)
- Tarlac Agricultural University – Golden Harvest
- Tarlac State University – The Work, The Oracle
- University of Baguio – The Campus Pulse
- University of Batangas – Westernian Advocate
- University of Bohol – The Varsitarian
- University of Cebu – LAKANDIWA
- University of Eastern Philippines – The Pillar
- University of Mindanao – Primum
- University of Negros Occidental - Recoletos – Tolentine Star
- University of Nueva Caceres – Naga City – The DEMOCRAT (College), The Pantograph (Senior High School), The Trailblazer (High School)
- University of Perpetual Help System (Laguna) – UPHL Gazette, FIAT Publications (Senior High)
- University of Perpetual Help System Laguna – Dr. Jose G. Tamayo Medical University – Caduceus
- University of Rizal System – The Legacy (Morong Campus), The Hilltop Chronicles (Tanay Campus), Tipolo (Antipolo Campus), The Petroglyphs (Angono Campus), The Pillars (Binangonan Campus), Pluma (Taytay Campus), The Chronicler (Cainta Campus)
- University of San Agustin – USA Publications
- University of San Jose Recoletos – FORWARD Publications
- University of San Carlos – Today's Carolinian
- University of Southeastern Philippines (Mabini) – The Stripper
- University of Southeastern Philippines (Mintal) – The Vision
- University of Southeastern Philippines (Obrero) – The Collegiate Headlight
- University of Southeastern Philippines (Bislig) – The Maharlikan
- University of Southern Mindanao – The Mindanao Tech
- University of the Assumption – Regina
- University of the Cordilleras – The Alternative
- University of the Immaculate Conception – The Collegiate Immaculate
- University of the Philippines Baguio – Outcrop
- University of the Philippines Cebu College – UP Tug-ani
- University of the Philippines Diliman Extension Program in Pampanga – UP Frontliner
- University of the Philippines Los Baños – UPLB Perspective, Tanglaw (College of Development Communication), The Staple (College of Economics and Management)
- University of the Philippines Mindanao – Himati
- University of the Philippines Visayas Tacloban College – UP Vista
- Wesleyan University Philippines – Genré (College), The Wesleyanian (High School), The Graders (Grade School)
- West Visayas State University – Forum-Dimensions
- Xavier University – Ateneo de Cagayan – The Crusader (College), The Squire (Senior High School), PAG-ASA (Junior High School), The Page (Grade School)

== Puerto Rico ==
- School of Communication of the University of Puerto Rico – Diálogo

== South Africa ==
=== Cape Town ===
- University of Cape Town – Varsity

=== KwaZulu-Natal Province ===
- University of KwaZulu-Natal – Nux

=== Potchefstroom ===
- University of North-West – Wapad

=== Pretoria ===
- University of Pretoria – Perdeby

=== Stellenbosch ===
- Stellenbosch University – Die Matie

== Singapore ==
- Ngee Ann Polytechnic – npTribune
- Nanyang Technological University – Nanyang Chronicle
- Nanyang Technological University – The Enquirer
- National University of Singapore – The Kent Ridge Common
- National University of Singapore – The Campus Observer
- Yale-NUS College – The Octant

== South Korea ==
- Joongdong High School – The Lion's Pride

== Sweden ==
- Lund University – Lundagård
- Malmö University College – Mahskara
- Umeå University – Vertex
- Royal Institute of Technology – Osqledaren

Göteborgs universitet Götherborgske Spionen

== Taiwan ==
- National Chengchi University – Uonline University News Online
- National Taiwan University Student News www.ntusnews.org (臺大學生報)

== Thailand ==
- Suankularb Wittayalai School – Pimsuan

== Turkey ==
- Boğaziçi University – Dinamik Gazete
- Bilkent University – GazeteBilkent
- Istanbul Technical University – Arıyorum

== United Arab Emirates ==
- New York University Abu Dhabi – The Gazelle

== See also ==
- National Pacemaker Award for college newspapers which have won the National Newspaper Pacemaker.
