= 2009 National Cheerleading Championship =

Fourth Philippines National Cheerleading Championship

The 4th season of National Cheerleading Championships was the biggest season for NCC so far. It started with the league's very first regionals for Southern Luzon region, followed by Northern Luzon region, Visayas-Mindanao region, and finally with the National Capital Region.

The season also witnessed the most number of participants in history of the competition for both divisions - high school and college.

== National finals ==
The first true nationals was held at Ynares Sports Arena in Pasig. Teams qualified from the Regionals come to Manila to compete.

=== High School division ===
High School division national finals was held at Ynares Sports Arena in Pasig last March 14, 2009. Teams from Southern Luzon, Northern Luzon, and National Capital Region competed for the national finals. Pasig Catholic College's PCC Crusaders was declared the National Champion for 2009.

Rank	Team name	Basic elements	Tumbling	Stunts	Tosses	Pyramids	Deductions	Total
1	Pasig Catholic College; PCC Crusaders	63.5	45	61.5	52	67	(6)	283
2	School of Saint Anthony; SSA Pep Squad	52	56	51.5	61	63	(10)	273.5
3	Taguig Science High School; Sinag Pep Squad Bookworms	46	37.5	50.5	52.5	59	(2)	243.5
4	Rizal High School; RHS Phoenix Pep Squad	54.2	41.5	51	55.5	59	(1)	240.5
5	Saint Pedro Poveda College; Poveda Hardcourt Varsity Team	54	44.5	48.5	47	48.5	(4)	238.5
6	BHC Educational Institution, Inc. BHC Centaurs	49	32	45.5	46	48.5	(10)	211
7	Children of Mary Immaculate College; Fighting Vanguards	50	37.5	38	45	40.5	(1)	210
8	Colegio San Agustin, Laguna; CSA Raptors	39.5	35.5	44.5	43.5	51	(6)	208
8	St. John of Beverley; SJB Skippers	52	31	38	46	42	(1)	208
10	Christ the King School of Cabuyao; CKSC Pep Squad	35	32	46	45	44.5	(8)	194.5
11	Baguio City National High School (Main); Baguio City NHS Pep Squad	24	44	40.5	41	46	(3)	192.5
12	Colegio San Agustin, Makati; CSA Red and Gold Boosters	43	39.5	40	41	35.5	(13)	186
13	Pines City National High School; PCNHS Green Lion	36.5	30	39	40	35	(23)	157.5
14	Jacobo Z. Gonzales Memorial National High School; JZGMNHS Pep Squad	25	43	34.5	38	30.5	(17)	154

=== College Division ===
College division national finals was held at Ynares Sports Arena in Pasig last March 15, 2009. Teams from Southern Luzon, Northern Luzon, Visayas-Mindanao region, and National Capital Region competed for the national finals. University of Perpetual Help System Dalta's UPHSD Perpsquad was declared the National Champion for 2009.

Rank	Team name	Basic elements	Tumbling	Stunts	Tosses	Pyramids	Deductions	Total
1	University of Perpetual Help System DALTA; UPHSD Altas Perpsquad	63	50	57.5	62.5	61.5	(1)	293.5
2	University of the Cordilleras; UC Dance Squad	65.5	63.5	51	55	68	(13)	290
3	Xavier University – Ateneo de Cagayan; Crusader Cheer Force	64.5	44	58.5	58.5	62.5	(3)	285
4	Central Colleges of the Philippines; CCP Bobcats	50	55.5	48	57.5	59.5	0	270.5
5	Mariano Marcos State University; MMSU Roosters	60	58.5	49	55	55.5	(14)	264
6	Far Eastern University; FEU Cheering Squad	56.5	47.5	49	56	60.5	(7)	262.5
7	University of St. La Salle; USLS Stingers Pep Squad	49.5	47.5	50	55	60.5	(12)	250.5
8	Ateneo de Manila University; Blue Babble Battalion	58	45	47.5	54	50	(5)	249.5
9	Rizal Technological University; RTU Pep Squad Blue Thunder	49	48	54	52	50.5	(23)	230.5
10	Polytechnic University of the Philippines, Taguig; PUPT Varsity Pep Squad	38	44.5	45.5	51.5	50.5	0	230
11	De La Salle University; DLSU Animo Squad (Green)	45	42.5	50	53.5	47.5	(21)	217.5
12	Emilio Aguinaldo College; EAC Generals Pep Squad	43	37.5	49	46.5	47.5	(14)	209.5
13	Mapua Institute of Technology; Cheerping Cardinals	36	47	49.5	49.5	48	(30)	200
14	Adamson University; Adamson Pep Squad	34.5	43.5	38.5	48.5	48.5	(15)	198.5
15	Saint Michael's College of Laguna; SMCL Archangels Pep Squad	29.5	33.5	44	48	39	(9)	185
16	South Luzon State University; SLSU Phoenix Squad	35	36	45.5	47.5	36.5	(24)	176.5
17	Union Christian College; UCC V.I.R.G.I.N.S.	32.5	42.5	45	46	37.5	(49)	154.5

== Regional Qualifiers ==
=== South Luzon ===
Held at St. Michael's College in Laguna, on September 7, 2008

==== High school ====
Rank	Team name	Basic elements	Tumbling	Stunts	Tosses	Pyramids	Deductions	Total
1	Colegio San Agustin-Laguna; CSA Raptors	47	45	52.5	48	54	(6)	240.5
2	Christ the King School of Cabuyao; CKSC Pep Squad	27.5	34	44.5	39.5	52.5	(28)	170
3	Jacobo Z. Gonzales Memorial National High School; JZGMNHS Pep Squad	27	43	36.5	28	36.5	(12)	159
4	Laguna College of Business and Arts; LCBA High Squad	24.5	29	33	34.5	31.5	(13)	139.5
5	Saint Michael's College of Laguna; SMCL Archangels Pep Squad	29	35	39	50	52.5	(73)	132.5

Legend:

Qualified for Finals

==== College ====
Rank	Team name	Basic elements	Tumbling	Stunts	Tosses	Pyramids	Deductions	Total
1	Lyceum of the Philippines University, Laguna; Lyceum Spartans Pep Squad	53	51	60.5	56.5	55	(36)	240
2	Southern Luzon State University; SLSU Phoenix Squad	56	40	55	48	50	(21)	228
3	Saint Michael's College of Laguna; SMCL Archangels Pep Squad	44	44.5	54.5	57.5	44.5	(26)	219
4	De La Salle Lipa; DLSL Danzcom Pep Squad	47	36	52	32.5	41.5	(4)	205
5	Trace College; TDC Stallions	29	31	30	28	30	(2)	146
6	AMA Computer College, Calamba; AMACC-Calamba Cheering Squad	36	25	21	29	18.5	(6)	123.5

Legend:

Qualified for Finals

=== North Luzon ===
==== High school ====
Rank	Team name	Basic elements	Tumbling	Stunts	Pyramids	Tosses	Deductions	Total
1	BHC Educational Insstitution, Inc. BHC Centaurs	47	33	42	57.5	32.5	(3)	209
2	Pines City National High School (Main); PCNHS Green Lion	31	45.5	53	47.5	42	(32)	187
3	Baguio City National High School (Main); Baguio City NHS Pep Squad	30.5	56	49.5	58.5	44	(66)	172.5
4	Tarlac State University - Laboratory School; TSU Laboratory School Blue Eagles Pep Squad	21	28.5	55.5	37	39	(37)	144
5	Baguio City National High School (Rizal Annex); Rizal Pep Squad	25	46.5	41	39.5	41	(61)	132
6	Pines City National High School (Bonifacio Annex); Bonnex Pep Squad	14	27	33	20.5	0	(13)	81.5
7	Baguio City National High School (Roxas Annex); Rhythmical Lynx	15	29	32.5	18	18	(76)	36.5

Legend:

Qualified for Finals

==== College ====
Rank	School	Basic elements	Tumbling	Stunts	Pyramids	Tosses	Deductions	Total
1	University of the Cordilleras; UC Dance Squad	67	72	53.5	66	63	(22)	299.5
2	Mariano Marcos State University; MMSU Roosters	52	70	51	58	68	(80)	219
3	Union Christian College; UCC V.I.R.G.I.N.S.	48	47	46.5	50.5	58.5	(44)	206.5
4	Northwestern University; NWU Sagunday Pep Squad	48	46	39	49	58.5	(39)	201.5
5	Tarlac State University; TSU CBA Cheerleading Squad	43	52	48	57	63.5	(82)	181.5
6	Saint Louis University; SLU Navigators	42	40	43	35	54	(42)	172
7	College of Engineering and Architecture - Saint Louis University; CEA-SLU Towers Pep Squad	41	34	41	30	33.5	(19)	160.5

Legend:

Qualified for Finals

=== Visayas-Mindanao ===
==== College ====
Rank	School	Basic elements	Tumbling	Stunts	Pyramids	Tosses	Deductions	Total
1	University of Cebu; UC Webmasters Cheer and Dance Team	66	58	58	61.5	61.5	(18)	287
2	Xavier University – Ateneo de Cagayan; XU Crusader Cheer Force	62	55	52	53	58.5	(18)	262.5
3	University of St. La Salle, Bacolod; USLS Stingers Pep Squad	51	57.5	47	53.5	62	(31)	240
4	Palawan State University, Puerto Princesa City; PSU Pep Squad	45	55.5	53	42.5	56.5	(17)	235.5
5	Notre Dame of Dadiangas University; NDDU Sarimanok Pep Squad	57	58.5	48	55	60.5	(45)	234
6	Southwestern University; SWU Cobras	35	30	28	36	38	(19)	148

Legend:

Qualified for Finals

=== Metro Manila ===
Held at Ynares Sports Arena, Pasig on February 28, 2009

==== High school ====
Rank	School	Basic elements	Tumbling	Stunts	Tosses	Pyramids	Deductions	Total
1	* School of Saint Anthony; SSA Pep Squad	58	61	53.5	64.5	56.5	(8)	285.5
2	Pasig Catholic College; PCC Crusaders	61	49	60	58.5	63.5	(10)	282
3	Rizal High School; RHS Phoenix Pep Squad	50	51	57	60.5	46	(11)	253.5
4	St. Pedro Poveda College; Poveda Hardcourt Varsity Team	52	48.5	47.5	48.5	47.5	(1)	243
5	Children of Mary Immaculate College; Fighting Vanguards	48	52	45	46.5	44	(3)	232.5
6	Taguig Science High School; Sinag Pep Squad Bookworms	50.5	49.5	51	53.5	41	(14)	231.5
7	St. John of Beverley; SJB Skippers	54	35	47	51.5	41	(4)	224.5
8	Colegio San Agustin, Makati; CSA Red and Gold Boosters	44	42	38	48	41.5	(2)	211.5
9	St. Louis College of Valenzuela; SLCV Dance Company	36	34	41	47	45.5	(5)	198.5
10	San Beda College, Alabang; Red Lions Junior Varsity	40	46	35	45	43.5	(17)	192.5
11	Assumption College; AC Hardcourt	43	38	30	43	28	(13)	169
12	Bangkal High School; Bangkal Pep Squad	37	51	46	45	34	(78)	135
12	Paco Citizen Academy Foundation; PCAF Wizards	30.5	29	30	33	32.5	0	155

Legend:

Qualified for finals
Automatic berth in Finals (defending champion)

==== College ====
Rank	School	Basic elements	Tumbling	Stunts	Tosses	Pyramids	Deductions	Total
1	University of Perpetual Help System DALTA; Altas Perpsquad	50	49.5	54.5	64.5	58	(1)	275.5
2	Central Colleges of the Philippines; CCP Bobcats	52	64	54	63	57	(21)	269
3	Rizal Technological University; RTU Pep Squad Blue Thunder	38	51.5	58.5	62.5	56.5	(13)	254
4	Mapua Institute of Technology; Mapua Cheerping Cardinals	45	49.5	52.5	59	51.5	(12)	245.5
5	Ateneo de Manila University; Ateneo Blue Babble Battalion	45.5	48	46.5	56.5	50	(4)	242.5
6	Far Eastern University; FEU Cheering Squad	48	52	51.5	62.5	57.5	(30)	241.5
7	Adamson University; Adamson Pep Squad	49	49	41	57.5	44.5	(11)	230
8	De La Salle University; DLSU Animo Squad	46.5	46	51	51.5	50.5	(20)	225.5
8	Polytechnic University of the Philippines, Taguig; PUPT Varsity Pep Squad	39	43.5	47.5	60	38.5	(3)	225.5
10	Emilio Aguinaldo College; EAC Generals Pep Squad	41	49.5	46.5	50.5	46	(10)	223.5
11	University of Makati; UM Pep Squad	47	43	51	57	51.5	(38)	211.5
12	Jose Rizal University; JRU Pep Squad	42	45	51.5	54	47	(39)	200.5
13	Saint Jude College Manila; SJC Charging Crusaders Pep Squad	38	33	39	52	40	(3)	199
14	Centro Escolar University; CEU Pep Squad	37	44.5	39	49	40	(27)	182.5
15	World Citi Colleges; WCC Pep Squad	29	25	35	48.5	35.5	(23)	150
16	Technological University of the Philippines-Taguig Campus; TUP Taguig Grey Hawks	38	40	37	56.5	35	(63)	143.5
17	Lyceum of the Philippines University; Lyceum Pirates	32	44	35.5	45.5	36.5	(52)	141.5

Legend:

Qualified for Finals
Automatic berth in Finals (defending champion)
