= 2008 National Cheerleading Championship =

The 3rd season of the National Cheerleading Championships was held at PhilSports Arena, Pasig, Philippines on March 9, 2008.

== Finals ==
High School Division
School	Basic Elements	Tumbling	Stunts	Pyramids	Tosses	Deductions	Total
School of Saint Anthony	56	57	57	58.5	59	(10)	277.5
School of the Holy Spirit	54	56	54	62.5	54	(13)	267.5
Taguig Science High School	53	48	55	56.5	53	(6)	259.5
Pasig Catholic College	46	46	53	50	50.5	(7)	238.5
San Beda College Alabang	41	46.5	45	51	53.5	(1)	236
Children of Mary Immaculate College of Valenzuela	41	46	48	58	53	(14)	232
Colegio San Agustin - Laguna	42	43	48	48	49.5	(10)	220.5

College Division
School	Basic Elements	Tumbling	Stunts	Pyramids	Tosses	Deductions	Total
Central Colleges of the Philippines	58	67	59.5	62.5	53	(17)	283
Mariano Marcos State University	42.5	52	62	63.5	69	(10)	279
Xavier University Ateneo de Cagayan	61.5	59	54.5	51	56	(4)	278
University of Perpetual Help System	47	58	60	57.5	61	(18)	265.5
Mapua Institute of Technology	44	51	54.5	55.5	49	(5)	249
Palawan State University	43	43	55	53.5	62	(13)	243.5
Ateneo de Manila University	53.5	53	50	52	54	(28)	234.5
Polytechnic University of the Philippines Taguig	37	47	44	53.5	52	(2)	231.5
Lyceum Institute of Technology - Laguna	33	45	49	55.5	56.5	(23)	216
Colegio de San Juan de Letran	37	39	40	48.5	48	(17)	195.5

== Qualifiers ==
High School Division

Rank	School	Basic Elements	Tumbling	Stunts	Tosses	Pyramids	Deductions	Total
1	School of the Holy Spirit	63	52	51	62	55	(7)	276
2	School of Saint Anthony	48	55	59	61	56	(24)	255
3	Children of Mary Immaculate College of Valenzuela	51.5	52	45	56	60.5	(11)	254
4	Pasig Catholic College	54	41	41.5	58.5	54.5	(8)	241.5
5	San Beda College Alabang	32	45	43	57	52	(4)	225
6	Colegio San Agustin - Laguna	37	39	46	50.5	51	(20)	203.5
7	Taguig Science High School	33	39	53.5	54	34.5	(11)	203
8	New Era High School	31	38	43.5	40	36	(9)	179.5
9	Assumption College	37	43	37	50.5	29.5	(20)	177
10	St. Michael's College of Laguna	30.5	34	37	51.5	36	(15)	174
11	Baclaran National High School	26.5	36	30	48	30	(63)	107.5

Legend:

Qualified for finals
Automatic Berth in finals (defending champion)

College Division

Rank	School	Basic Elements	Tumbling	Stunts	Tosses	Pyramids	Deductions	Total
1	University of Perpetual Help System Delta	50.5	51	61	61	60.5	(2)	282
2	Central Colleges of the Philippines	57.5	59	53	58	56.5	(17)	267
3	Palawan State University	48	45	52	63	57.5	(12)	253.5
4	Xavier University Ateneo de Cagayan de Oro	56	49	55	59	56.5	(29)	246.5
5	Ateneo de Manila University	51.5	51	55	52	52	(23)	238.5
5	Mapua Institute of Technology	61.5	47	56.5	57	44.5	(28)	238.5
7	Technological University of the Philippines - Taguig	49.5	34	46	62	51.5	(15)	228
8	Lyceum Institute of Technology, Laguna	34.5	35	41	60	48.5	(6)	213
9	Colegio de San Juan de Letran	38.5	38	54.5	51	51	(24)	209
10	Mariano Marcos State University	45	49	49	63	53	(58)	201
11	Rizal Technological University	37	47	55	64	51.5	(55)	199.5
12	Technological University of the Philippines, Taguig	32.5	35	44	45	50	(8)	198.5
13	Adamson University	40	44	34	48	49.5	(22)	193.5
14	San Sebastian College – Recoletos	37	35	35	46	48	(26)	175
15	Pamantasan ng Lungsod ng Maynila	28.5	29	39	51	48	(56)	139.5
16	San Beda College Alabang	28	26	31	26	37	(24)	124
17	Lyceum of the Philippines University	34	36	30	26	36	(41)	121
	University of Makati	43	40	57.5	59	61.5	(14)	247

Legend:

Qualified for finals
Automatic Berth in finals (defending champion)
Exhibition performance only
