= University of San Agustin Publications =

Student publication in Iloilo, Philippines

- Docilis. Developmental. Investigatio-dicentur
- Type: Student publication
- Format: Broadsheet, magazine, book, wall newspaper
- Owner: Students of the University of San Agustin
- Founder(s): Jose Mijares, Jose Sanchez
- Editor-in-chief: Mary Colleen Faith J. Salcedo, Joewen Ray L. Ducado
- Founded: August 1928
- Language: English, Filipino
- Headquarters: 2/F Alumni Building, University of San Agustin, Iloilo City, Iloilo, Philippines
- Circulation: 5,000 copies University-wide and selected local and national government and non-government organizations, online version is also available
- Website: USA Publications Official Website

The University of San Agustin (USA) Publications (USA Publications, informally known as USA Pub) is the official student press corps of the University of San Agustin in Iloilo City, Philippines. Originally a high school publication of Colegio de San Agustin de Iloilo (former name of USA), it was founded on 1928 with its first recorded publication released in August 1928. It is the oldest Catholic campus publication in Asia outside Manila. The press corps publishes The Augustinian Mirror (magazine), The Augustinian (newspaper), Irong-irong (literary journal), Dingding ni Gusting (community wall newspaper), and other special issues.

Today it is one of the most awarded college press corps in the Philippines. It has received its first national distinction when The Augustinian Mirror was adjudged as one of the three best-edited school magazines in the country during the late 1950s.

== History ==
=== Early years ===
The USA Publications started out as the official school organ of the old Colegio de San Agustin de Iloilo (now University of San Agustin). The need for a school publication was felt as early as 1927. The idea to have a publication came from high school students, Jose Mijares and Jose Sanchez. These students presented their plan to the school's rector that time, Fr. Vidal Yraeta, O.S.A. who approved it without much ado. Jose Mijares was appointed as the first editor-in-chief with Jose Sanchez and Eduardo Campos as associate editors. Fr. Mariano Sapiña, O.S.A. was its first moderator and adviser.

The staff members were able to release the first issue of The Augustinian Mirror in August 1928. It came out in an 8-page tabloid form with its masthead using Old English Text font face.

=== Early International Exposition ===
Despite an early age of establishment, the USA Publications had fast upgrades and was not only circulated in the school, rather, it reached the national and international scenes. The fast upgrades were characterized by great improvement in terms of equipment and library building.

Jose Sanchez, associate editor that time, gained distinction as the best national short story writer in a national contest. In April 1936, The Augustinian Mirror was exhibited in the exposition of Catholic press at the Vatican.

=== Post World War II ===
The USA Publications had to stop its operation during the Second World War. The Colegio was also closed for the same. However, in the second half of the 1940s, the resumption of the operations of the Colegio and the press corps were characterized by the evolution of The Augustinian Mirror from a tabloid form into a magazine. The first woman editor in the person of Josefa Contreras led the staff from 1946 to 1948.

It was on 1 March 1953 when the Colegio de San Agustin de Iloilo was granted university status by the Philippine government making it the first university in Western Visayas. In 1954, during the Golden Jubilee of the university, Primo Esleyer became the editor-in-chief. Under his leadership, he was able to come up with a 110-page magazine which contained most of the events during the said anniversary.

On 15 September 1954, the first issue of The Augustinian was released during the rectorship of Rev. Fr. Isaac Insunza, OSA. The Augustinian was a monthly newspaper that was conceived to enable students to have more prompt appraisal of the happenings in the university.

In 1956, The Augustinian Mirror was a winner in a competition for school publications when it was given awards as Best College Magazine, Second Best Newspaper, Best Editorial Page, Best Sports Page, Second Best Literary Page. It was then adjudged as one of the three best edited school magazines in the National Collegiate Press Contest. The same title was awarded to the USA Publications in 1958.

In 1962, the USA Publications and other departmental publications of the University of San Agustin hosted the delegates coming from 22 campus publications in Western Visayas in celebrating the feast of St. Francis de Sales, the patron saint of journalism. Fr. Rafael Lopez was the moderator.

In 1966, The Augustinian Mirror editor-in-chief Wilfredo Segovia was elected national president of the College Editors Guild of the Philippines (CEGP) alongside Daniel Florida Jr. of The Quezonian (official publication of the Manuel L. Quezon University). Segovia was one of the only two past national presidents of the CEGP who came from outside the Luzon.

The College Editors Guild of the Philippines was a national organization of campus journalists founded in 1931 by The Varsitarian of the University of Santo Tomas, The National of the National University, The Philippine Collegian of the University of the Philippines and The GUIDON of the Ateneo de Manila University.

=== The Marcos Era and the Martial Law Period ===
As the Marcos dictatorship tightened its grip over the nation, students in major universities especially in Manila and parts of Western Visayas became more active, spearheading the movement for reforms. The student ferment in San Agustin boiled over through the student council, led by it president, Linda Marie Palma, who, in 1967–68 was also editor of the Mirror after Segovia. Leodegario Tabios took over the Mirror during the lead-up to the First Quarter Storm and tried to influence the studentry towards centrist politics. (Palma and Tabios were married in 1971)

No issue of the publications came out in 1972–1973 during the first year of Martial Law declared by the late Philippine President Ferdinand Marcos. The youngest editor of the USA Publications, in the person of Ma. Leah Rosana Ravena at the age of 16, led the staff in 1973–1974.

From 1976 to 1991, Anita Bellosillo served as moderator of the USA Publications.

In 1976, the first Regional College Press (COPRE) Conference and Awards was organized by the Ministry of Public Information VI (now the Philippine Information Agency Regional Office 6 or simply, PIA-6). It was first facilitated by the USA Publications and The Central Echo, the official school publication of Central Philippine University. Various colleges and universities from Aklan, Antique, Capiz, Guimaras, Iloilo and Negros Occidental participated the event. Today, it is now solely organized by PIA-6 and is sponsored by Smart Communications, Inc. and the Canadian Urban Institute.

Since the beginning of COPRE, The Augustinian Mirror won Best College Development Communication Magazine; thus earning them the first Gawad Graciano Lopez Jaena Award for winning the said distinction for five consecutive years (1976–1981). The staff members were awarded a presidential trophy. The Augustinian Mirror also won the Antonio Tagamolila Award for its intelligent discussion of socio-political issues during the National Collegiate Press Conference organized by CEGP. The Augustinian, on the other hand, won Best Tourism-oriented Paper in Western Visayas from 1980 to 1982. It was awarded by the Department of Tourism.

Two editors-in-chief, Raul S. Anlocotan and Jobert (Penaflorida) Yap received the Presidential Gold Medal Awards in 1983 and 1984, respectively, for being part of the Most Outstanding Campus Writers in the Philippines, given by the Office of the President of the Philippines (Office of Media Affairs now the Philippine Information Agency). In 1984 (with Raul Anlocotan and Leomil Aportadera as editors-in-chief of the Augustinian Publications) and 1987, The Augustinian Mirror again won best magazine in COPRE.

The USA Publications editors monopolized the championship awards in the National Rizal Essay Writing Contest for seven consecutive years. Moreover, the "Most Outstanding Graduate" award of the University of San Agustin was also monopolized by its editors from 1977 to 1990.

=== The Nineties ===
In June 1991, when Bellosillo was appointed by the University of San Agustin to be the chairperson of the English Department, Flaviano Manalo took over the moderatorship. Under his stewardship, The Augustinian Mirror won its second Gawad Graciano Lopez Jaena for winning Best College Magazine from 1987 to 1992. In 1993, the PIA granted The Augustinian Mirror the privilege of not to compete in the yearly competition for five years. The Augustinian emerged as Best Newspaper in Western Visayas in the November 1995 COPRE Conference and Awards held at Bacolod, Negros Occidental.

After the expiry of the five-year exemption in 1998, Cynette Lovelyn Mirasol, editor, led The Augustinian Mirror to victory of winning again the Best College Magazine title in COPRE held at Roxas City, Capiz.

=== The New Millennium ===
The Augustinian Mirror and The Augustinian remained on top from 2000 up to its last reception of the third Gawad Graciano Lopez Jaena Award in 2004 which again gave them a privilege of not joining the Regional College Press Conference for five years. By this time, the USA Publications already had five of the said title, three for The Augustinian Mirror and two for The Augustinian.

On 2002, Diosdadita Arungayan took over the moderatorship. And on 2004, Carlos Palanca Memorial Awardee for Literature John Iremil Teodoro became moderator.

As an indication that the University of San Agustin was leading the way in publication efforts, the USA Publications organized the 1st Gusting Campus Journalism Seminar on 19–20 October 2004 at the campus. It was attended by more than 50 student journalists coming from various educational institutions in Western Visayas. The seminar continued for three years. The San Ag Campus Press Awards was also launched the following year. It was a regional press competition for publications in high schools, colleges and universities all over Western Visayas, both public and private.

The Augustinian Mirror from 2004 to 2008 transformed into a tourism-oriented magazine which has featured the various provinces in the country such as Cebu, Guimaras, Iloilo, Mindoro, and Palawan. On 2009, it was supposed to feature the Ilocos Region; however, with budget constraints, the staff decided not to push through with the plan. During the later part of this period, Erwin Sustento took over the position moderator when Teodoro transferred to another school in Metro Manila.

Irong-irong, the official student literary journal of the university was launched in 2005 with Arlene Moscaya as the first editor.

The last regional San Ag Campus Press Awards was then held in 2010. The Spectrum of the University of St. La Salle in Bacolod, Negros Occidental won the title, Best College Newspaper; while The Central Echo of Central Philippine University in Jaro District, Iloilo City won the title Best College Magazine.

=== Digital Era ===
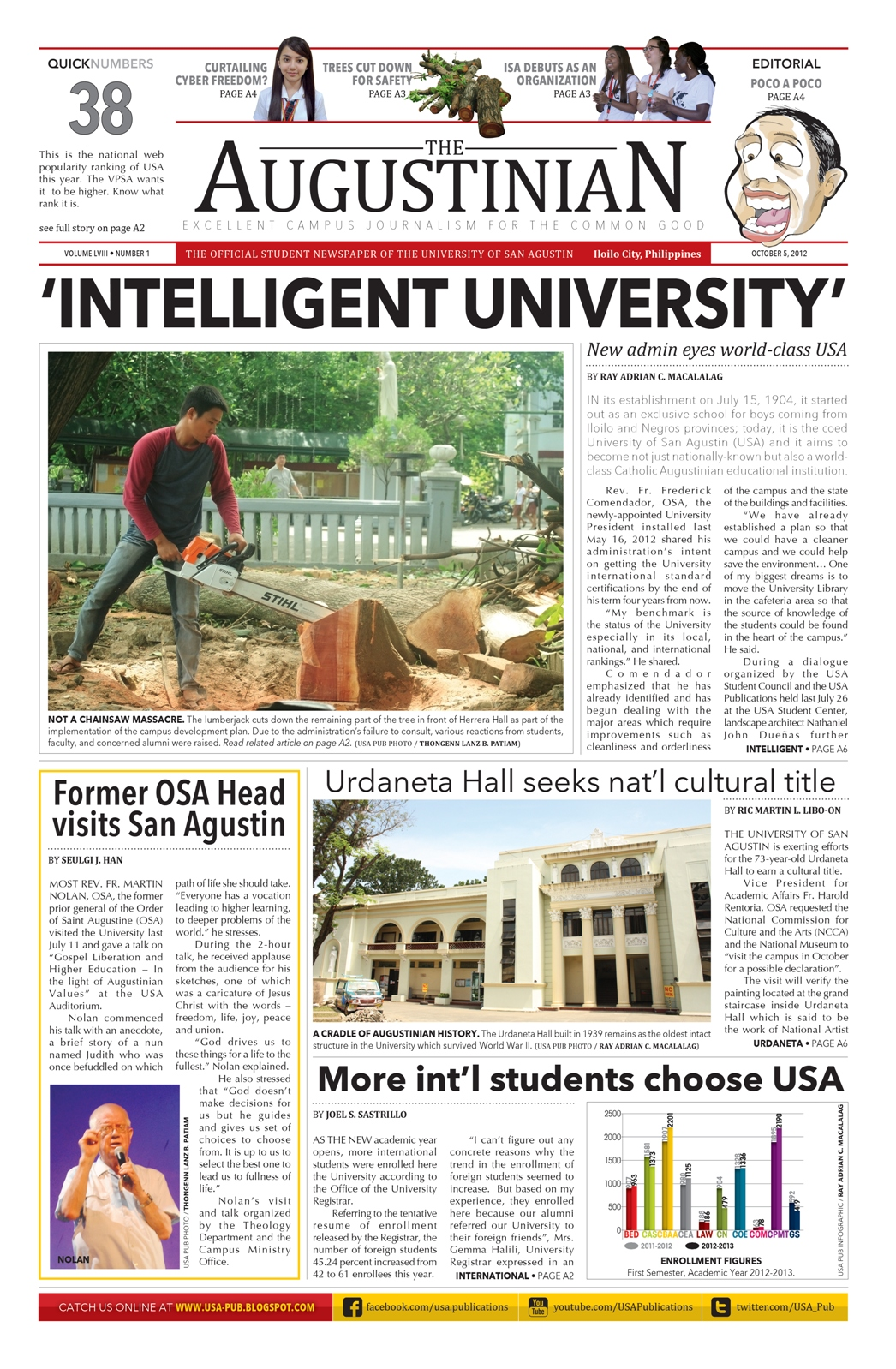
The Augustinian October 2012 issue, awarded as Best College Newspaper in the 3rd National Campus Press Awards

On Academic Year 2009–2010, the USA Publications was the supposed comeback for the Regional College Press (COPRE) Conference. However, the staff decided to hold its last San Ag Campus Press Awards on 2010 and move their participation in COPRE that year. The editors that time were Jefferson Magbanua and Pietros Val Patricio.

On Academic Year 2010–2011, Jefferson Magbanua and Donna Isabelle Fresnido were the editors-in-chief. Gladys Confesor, on the other hand, took the challenge of being moderator of the USA Publications. This year was the comeback to press competitions. Developments were further done in the publications through the efforts of their managing editor, Ray Adrian Macalalag, who introduced the USA Publications to online visibility. The USA Publications joined the 2010 COPRE and the 1st Smart Communications Campus Blogsite Contest. A community wall newspaper was also launched under the supervision of Jerson Elmido and it won second best wall newspaper; The Augustinian Mirror place fifth Best College magazine; and the USA Publications placed fifth in the blogsite contest.

On Academic Year 2011–2012, the editors-in-chief were both replaced after Magbanua and Fresnido graduated. From 2006 to 2011, the editors came from the College of Arts and Sciences but this academic year came in with editors coming from other colleges. Mary Leslie Eregia, from the College of Pharmacy and Medical Technology, topped the qualifying examination and became the editor of the Mirror, while Ray Adrian Macalalag, from the College of Engineering and Architecture, took the second highest spot in the exam which earned him the title of being editor of The Augustinian. During this period, the USA Publications had further developments such as online edition of the publications they produced. They were able to join two competitions: the Spectrum Fellowship National Campus Press Awards organized by The Spectrum of the University of St. La Salle and the COPRE which is co-organized by PIA-6 and Smart Communications, Inc.

The Augustinian placed fifth in Best Newspaper in COPRE while the entire USA Publications placed second in the 2nd Smart Communications Campus Blogsite Contest. Dingding ni Gusting placed first Best Wall Newspaper. Meanwhile, The Augustinian Mirror participated in the Spectrum Fellowship National Campus Press Awards and reaped Best Magazine, Best Magazine Layout, and Best Magazine Cover Design. Macalalag and Genessa Buenafe, associate editor, were named among the Ten Outstanding Campus Journalists in the national awards.

On Academic Year 2012–2013, the USA Publications was led by Macalalag and Josefa Maria Castro. The USA Publications gathered major developments on online visibility by launching its USA Publications News, a web newscast which is said to be the first ever to be done in Visayas if not the entire country. The web newscast was also part of their advocacy to use lesser quantity of paper. This advocacy was further strengthened by decreasing the size of their newspaper and using less-space-consuming fonts. This academic year was truly blessed after the USA Publications won both Best College Magazine and Best College Newspaper in the 9th Spectrum Fellowship National Campus Press Awards. Castro was awarded Best Opinion Article and Macalalag remained in the Ten Outstanding Campus Journalists. In COPRE, the USA Publications landed in first place in the 3rd Smart Communications Campus Blogsite Contest; Dingding ni Gusting won its two-peat for Best Wall Newspaper; The Augustinian landed as second Best College Newspaper; The Augustinian Mirror landed third Best College Magazine; and Irong-irong which debuted in the competition won third Best College Literary Folio.

USA Publications is a student news organization in the Philippines. It operates a website and produces several local and national print publications.

== Publications ==
=== The Augustinian Mirror ===
The Augustinian Mirror, or simply Mirror, is the official student magazine of the University of San Agustin. It was established in August 1928 after its publication of its first issue which is an eight-page tabloid. It also marked the foundation of the USA Publications.

The content of the magazine has varied throughout its history. It was first intended to be a newspaper until the later 1950s when The Augustinian was established. It usually contained news, features, and literary works in the past. However, after it changed its format into a magazine, only features, literary works, and sometimes editorials and opinions, appeared on its pages.

Today, The Augustinian Mirror has been standardized by the staff members with the following sections:

| Opinion | Column articles written by the staff members, alumni, or organizational presidents |
| Religion | Articles which feature Roman Catholicism, as well as other religions and their customs |
| Society | Human interest stories; personal sketches and biographies of people, or group of persons and how they live their lives |
| Culture | Articles which highlight the practices, behavior, customs, and traditions |
| Campus | Features on the people and organizations in the university |
| Sci-Tech | Articles related in science, health, and technology |
| Food and Lifestyle | Special section for how-to articles, places, food, etc. |
| Reviews | Various reviews on music, movies, books, games, and more |
| Perspectives | Themed photography page |

Aside from these sections, the Mirror also contains graphic pages which convey quotes with photographs. Infographics can also be seen on its pages.

From 2010 to present, The Augustinian Mirror has won the following major titles as Best Magazine:

| Event | Year | Award | Organizer | Notes |
|---|---|---|---|---|
| The 35th Regional College Press Conference | 2010 | 5th place | Philippine Information Agency 6 | also won 2nd Best Editorial Page |
| The 36th Regional College Press Conference | 2011 | Finalist | Philippine Information Agency 6 | 4th Place Best Magazine Cover |
| The 2nd National Campus Press Awards | 2012 | 1st Place | University of St. La Salle | also won Best Layout, Best Cover Design, Best Opinion Article, 2nd Best Investigative Report, 2nd Best Feature Article, and 3rd Best Human Interest Story |
| The 3rd National Campus Press Awards | 2012 | 1st Place | University of St. La Salle | also won Best Layout, Best Cover Design, and Best Opinion Article |
| The 37th Regional College Press Conference | 2012 | 3rd Place | Philippine Information Agency 6 | also won 2nd Best Editorial Page and 4th Best Cover Design |
| The 2nd Central Echo Summit: Gawad Balangay Awards | 2013 | 1st Place | Central Philippine University | |
| The 38th Regional College Press Conference | 2013 | 3rd Place | Philippine Information Agency 6 | also won Best Magazine Cover Design, Best Magazine Layout, and 2nd Best Feature Page |
| The 39th Regional College Press Conference | 2014 | Finalist | Philippine Information Agency 6 | Won 2nd Best Feature Page |
| The 4th National Campus Press Awards | 2015 | 1st Place | University of St. La Salle | Also won 3rd Best Magazine Cover Design, and 3rd Best Magazine Layout |
| The 40th Regional College Press Conference | 2015 | 4th place | Philippine Information Agency 6 | Also won 3rd Best Magazine Layout, 4th Best Magazine Cover Design, 5th Best Feature Page |
| The 41st Regional College Press Conference | 2016 | 3rd Place | Philippine Information Agency 6 | Also won 3rd Best Feature Page, 3rd Best Magazine Layout, 4th Best Magazine Cover Design |
| The 6th National Campus Press Awards | 2017 | 1st Place | University of St. La Salle | Also won Best Magazine Layout |
| The 42nd Regional College Press Conference | 2017 | 2nd Place | Philippine Information Agency 6 | Also won Best Magazine Layout, 3rd Best Feature Page, and 3rd Best Filipino Page |
| The 43rd Regional College Press Conference | 2018 | 1st Place | Philippine Information Agency 6 | First time to win since its return to the Regional College Press Conference |
| The 44th Regional College Press Conference | 2019 | 3rd Place | Philippine Information Agency 6 | Also won 2nd Best Magazine Cover Design and 3rd Best Magazine Layout Design |
| The Manila Times 3rd Campus Press Awards | 2020 | 1st Place | The Manila Times | The first time for The Augustinian Mirror to win the top title. |

=== The Augustinian ===
The Augustinian is the official student newspaper of the University of San Agustin. It has the following sections:

| News Fold | The News Fold or the outer fold of the compact newspaper consists of news articles, opinion articles, special reports, and sports articles. |
| Features Fold | The Features Fold or the inner fold of the compact newspaper consists of feature articles, Spectacle (for reviews), and Panorama (photography page). |
| Newsletter/News Magazine/Special Issues | These are usually published during special coverages of various school events. Limited copies are usually made available for the students on a first-come, first-served basis. |

From 2011 to present, The Augustinian has won the following major titles as Best Newspaper / Best Tabloid / Best Newsletter:

| Event | Year | Award | Organizer | Notes |
|---|---|---|---|---|
| The 36th Regional College Press Conference | 2011 | 5th place | Philippine Information Agency 6 | Also won 4th Best Layout, 4th Best News Page |
| The 3rd National Campus Press Awards | 2012 | 1st Place | University of St. La Salle | Also won Best Newspaper Layout |
| The 37th Regional College Press Conference | 2012 | 2nd Place | Philippine Information Agency 6 | Also won Best Newspaper Layout, Best News Page, 2nd Best Sports Page |
| The 2nd Central Echo Summit: Gawad Balangay Awards | 2013 | 1st Place | Central Philippine University | |
| The 38th Regional College Press Conference | 2013 | 3rd Place | Philippine Information Agency 6 | Newsletter Edition, first time to join in this category |
| The 38th Regional College Press Conference | 2013 | 1st Place | Philippine Information Agency 6 | Also won Best News Page, Best Editorial Page, Best Newspaper Layout, and 5th Best Sports Page |
| The 39th Regional College Press Conference | 2014 | 2nd Place | Philippine Information Agency 6 | Newsletter Edition |
| The 39th Regional College Press Conference | 2014 | 1st Place | Philippine Information Agency 6 | Also won Best News Page, Best Newspaper Layout, 2nd Best Editorial Page, and 2nd Best Sports Page |
| The 40th Regional College Press Conference | 2015 | 4th place | Philippine Information Agency 6 | Newsletter Edition |
| The 40th Regional College Press Conference | 2015 | 3rd Place | Philippine Information Agency 6 | Also won Best Newspaper Layout, Best Editorial Page, 3rd Best News Page, 5th Best Sports Page |
| The 41st Regional College Press Conference | 2016 | 3rd Place | Philippine Information Agency 6 | Also won Best Newspaper Layout, 4th Best News Page |
| The 41st Regional College Press Conference | 2016 | 3rd Place | Philippine Information Agency 6 | Newsletter Edition |
| The 41st Regional College Press Conference | 2016 | 2nd Place | Philippine Information Agency 6 | E-Newsletter Edition (First Time to Join) |
| The 6th National Campus Press Awards | 2017 | Finalist | University of St. La Salle | Won 2nd Place, Best Editorial |
| The 44th Regional College Press Conference | 2019 | 3rd Place | Philippine Information Agency 6 | Also won Best Newspaper Layout, Best Sports Page, 5th Best News Page, and 4th Best Editorial Page |
| The 44th Regional College Press Conference | 2019 | 5th place | Philippine Information Agency 6 | Newsletter Edition |
| The 44th Regional College Press Conference | 2019 | 5th place | Philippine Information Agency 6 | E-Newsletter Edition |
| The Manila Times 3rd Campus Press Awards | 2020 | 1st Place | The Manila Times | The first time for The Augustinian to win the top title. |

=== Irong-irong ===
Irong-irong is the official student literary journal of the University of San Agustin. It is published once every school year. It contains literary as well as artistic works of students, alumni, and faculty of the university. Irong-irong was started by John Iremil Teodoro who was then the moderator of the USA Publications.

Irong-irong joined press competitions starting 2012 and has won the following major titles as Best Literary Journal/Folio:

| Event | Year | Award | Organizer |
|---|---|---|---|
| The 37th Regional College Press Conference | 2012 | 3rd Place | Philippine Information Agency 6 |
| The 2nd Central Echo Summit: Gawad Balangay Awards | 2013 | 1st Place | Central Philippine University |
| The 38th Regional College Press Conference | 2013 | 2nd Place | Philippine Information Agency 6 |
| The 39th Regional College Press Conference | 2014 | 5th place | Philippine Information Agency 6 |
| The 4th National Campus Press Awards | 2015 | 2nd Place, Best Cover Design | University of St. La Salle |
| The 4th National Campus Press Awards | 2015 | 1st Place | University of St. La Salle |
| The 41st Regional College Press Conference | 2016 | 3rd Place | Philippine Information Agency 6 |
| The 6th National Campus Press Awards | 2017 | 2nd Place | University of St. La Salle |

=== Dingding ni Gusting ===
As a way to help the communities in far-flung places, the USA Publications publishes Dingding ni Gusting, a wall newspaper that contains local news, features, and opinion articles that will greatly benefit the community. It started in 2010.

As the latest addition to the printed publications of the press corps, it immediately joined press competitions and has won the following titles as Best Wall Newspaper:

| Event | Year | Award | Organizer |
|---|---|---|---|
| The 35th Regional College Press Conference | 2010 | 2nd Place | Philippine Information Agency 6 |
| The 36th Regional College Press Conference | 2011 | 1st Place | Philippine Information Agency 6 |
| The 37th Regional College Press Conference | 2012 | 1st Place | Philippine Information Agency 6 |
| The 38th Regional College Press Conference | 2013 | 4th place | Philippine Information Agency 6 |
| The 39th Regional College Press Conference | 2014 | 5th place | Philippine Information Agency 6 |
| The 40th Regional College Press Conference | 2015 | 3rd Place | Philippine Information Agency 6 |
| The 41st Regional College Press Conference | 2016 | 1st Place | Philippine Information Agency 6 |
| The 42nd Regional College Press Conference | 2017 | 1st Place | Philippine Information Agency 6 |
| The 43rd Regional College Press Conference | 2018 | 1st Place | Philippine Information Agency 6 |
| The 44th Regional College Press Conference | 2019 | 1st Place | Philippine Information Agency 6 |

=== Other publications ===
During the opening of the school year, the USA Publications produces the Pang-abi-abi New Student Orientation Primer. It is a small sized magazine similar to the size of the Reader's Digest and it contains features suitable for new students in the university.

The USA Publications also provide online editions of all the printed publications mentioned above. All the online versions are available on their official website. Aside from the website, they also publish articles in Journ.ph, a platform developed by Smart Communications, Inc. and Ateneo de Manila University.

Collectively, the USA Publications carried its brand in the following competitions:

| Event | Year | Award | Organizer |
|---|---|---|---|
| The 1st Smart Communications Campus Blogsite Contest | 2010 | 5th place | Smart Communications |
| The 2nd Smart Communications Campus Blogsite Contest | 2011 | 2nd Place | Smart Communications |
| The 3rd National Campus Press Awards | 2012 | Publication of the Year | University of St. La Salle |
| The 3rd Smart Communications Campus Blogsite Contest | 2012 | 1st Place | Smart Communications |
| The 2nd Central Echo Summit: Gawad Balangay Awards | 2013 | Best University Publication | Central Philippine University |
| The 4th Smart Communications Campus Blogsite Contest | 2013 | 2nd Place | Smart Communications |
| The Manila Times and The Manila Times College Campus Press Awards | 2018 | Best Layout Design (College) | The Manila Times and The Manila Times College |

== Special Programs ==
=== Gusting Campus Journalism Fellowship ===
The Gusting Campus Journalism Fellowship started in 2004 when the USA Publications was granted by the PIA-6 an exemption from joining COPRE for five years after winning its third Gawad Lopez Jaena for The Augustinian Mirror. It was a regional event where the staff members share their knowledge in campus journalism to fellow writers in the region. A few years after its launching, however, it stopped its operations due to lack of funding and time since the staff members also produce publications regularly.

The event has been revived last 2013 and has been made exclusively for the colleges and departments of the University of San Agustin. Schools under the Order of Saint Augustine in the Philippines are also welcomed to join. On its revival, San Jose Catholic School in Iloilo City also participated.

=== Regional High School Journalism Quiz Bee ===
This event started last 2014 which catered to the various secondary institutions of the Western Visayas Region. The event aims to inculcate the theoretical as well as technical aspect of journalism to high school students.

=== San Ag Campus Press Awards ===
The San Ag Campus Press Awards also formed for the same reason as the establishment of the Gusting Campus Journalism Fellowship. It catered to recognize the outstanding publications both in high school and in college throughout the region as well as the departmental publications of the university. Today, it only caters exclusively for Augustinian schools and the different colleges of the university.

=== St. Augustine Essay Writing Contest ===
The St. Augustine Essay Writing contest is regularly organized by the USA Publications as part of the Patron Saint's Day celebration of the university every August. Students from the different colleges and departments of the university write a themed essay on-the-spot. Winners for both English and Filipino categories are recognized.

== Notable alumni ==
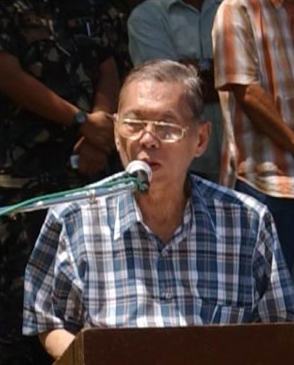
Former Philippine Secretary of Justice, Raul Gonzalez Sr. was editor-in-chief in 1952.

- Wilfredo Segovia – (editor-in-chief) former College Editors Guild of the Philippines national president and founder of The Segovia Group, a leading civil-structural consultancy firm in the Asia-Pacific region. He is a second placer in the 2013 Philippine Real Estate Consultant Board Exam
- Jobert Peñaflorida / Jobert Yap – (editor-in-chief) former news anchor at TV Patrol Panay and currently anchor of 24 Oras Western Visayas
- Raul Anlocotan – (editor-in-chief) former Regional Director of the National Economic and Development Authority MIMAROPA Regional Office
- Raul Gonzalez – (editor-in-chief) former Chief Presidential Legal Counsel and was the Former Secretary of Justice of the Philippines.
- Isidoro Cruz – (editor-in-chief) Palanca Memorial Award for Literature recipient
- John Iremil Teodoro – (literary writer, former moderator) Palanca Memorial Award for Literature recipient
- Eric Divinagracia – (editor-in-chief) one of the Ten Outstanding Students of the Philippines (1996), a former development intern of Symphony Space in Broadway, New York City
- Rogelio Gabiano Jr. – (editor-in-chief) one of the Philippines' top travel bloggers
- Johnny Esmilla Jr. – (editor-in-chief) fifth placer in the September 2008 national Licensure Examination for Teachers
- Andre Karl Faculin – (associate editor) third placer in the September 2013 national Medical Technologist Licensure Examination
- Genessa Buenafe – (associate editor) third placer in the September 2014 national Medical Technologist Licensure Examination
- Joyce Gem Canete – (editor-in-chief) sixth placer in the January 2016 national Pharmacist Licensure Examination
- Ray Adrian Macalalag – (editor-in-chief, moderator) Philippine Youth Ambassador in the Japan-East Asia Network Exchange of Students and Youths (JENESYS) Programme 2015 in Tokyo and Shizuoka, Japan and first Filipino civil engineer to present research in the World Road Congress organized by the World Road Association on its XXVIth season held in Abu Dhabi, United Arab Emirates in 2019. He was named as one of the four members (first from the Philippines and Southeast Asia) of the leadership team in the International Road Federation Young Professionals Programme (2021-2022).
- Anne Catherine Malazarte – (art director) One of the Ten Outstanding Students of the Philippines (2016), 2015 Vision Petron National Art Competition (Video Category) Grand Prize Winner

== Past Editors ==
- 1927–1929 Jose Mijares
- 1929–1930 Luis Hervas
- 1930–1931 Celso Tabobo
- 1931–1932 Salvador Campos
- 1932–1933 Isidro Lee
- 1933–1934 Enrique Garcia
- 1934–1935 Ramon Gonzales
- 1935–1936 Jesus Hervas
- 1936–1937 Ramon Gonzales
- 1937–1938 Lucas Locsin
- 1938–1939 Avelino Damian
- 1939–1940 Edgardo Sindico
- 1940–1941 Isidro Bretaña
- 1941–1945 None (WWII)
- 1945–1946 Rodolfo Jocson
- 1946–1947 Josefa Contreras
- 1947–1948 Josefa Contreras and Alberto Liboon
- 1948–1949 Felipe Pendon
- 1949–1950 Ramon Gonzales
- 1950–1951 Leopoldo Botavera
- 1951–1952 Raul Gonzales
- 1952–1953 Oscar Mabilog
- 1953–1954 Benito Gatpatan
- 1954–1956 Primo Esleyer
- 1956–1957 Ermelo Biron
- 1957–1959 Antonio Tagaro
- 1959–1960 Rodolfo Belita
- 1960–1961 Emelita Porras
- 1961–1962 Evelyn Camposano
- 1962–1963 Amelia Salvador
- 1963–1965 Rene Paroginog
- 1965–1966 Leonardo Sionzon
- 1966–1967 Wilfredo Segovia
- 1967–1968 Linda Marie Palma
- 1968–1969 Leodegario Tabios
- 1969–1970 Salvador Cabigayan
- 1970–1971 Deogracias Paredes
- 1971–1972 Eduardo Gonzales
- 1972–1973 None (Martial Law)
- 1973-1974 Ma. Leah Rosanna Ravena
- 1974–1975 Teodoro Montelibano and Vicente Salas
- 1975–1976 Meriam Baniel and Sampaguita Monteblanco
- 1976–1977 Cecile Ariete and Ma. Leah Rosanna Ravena
- 1977–1978 Anna Marie Cornelio and Venerando Eclar
- 1978–1979 Henry Bueron Caspe and Anna Marie Cornelio
- 1979–1980 Roberto Berba and Cornelio Panes
- 1980–1981 Domingo Lazaro and Mylene Miciano
- 1981–1982 Sandra Anotado and Ramonito Velasco
- 1982–1983 Marvin Bionat and Ed Larry Brasileño
- 1983–1984 Leomil Aportadera and Raul Anlocotan
- 1984–1986 Evalyn Ursua and Jobert Yap
- 1986–1987 Edmund Faro and Mary Josephine Jardiolin
- 1987–1988 Edmund Faro and Naomi Cosette Rigor
- 1988–1989 Rey Saluba and Ivan Suansing
- 1989–1990 Jigger Latoza and Sylvia Yvonne Silveo
- 1990–1991 Jigger Latoza and Ernest Federiso
- 1991–1992 Benedicto Panigbatan and Mary Therese Esther Ita-as
- 1992–1993 Benedicto Panigbatan and Erna Elizan
- 1993–1994 Erna Elizan and Isidoro Cruz
- 1994–1996 Eric Divinagracia
- 1996–1997 Imelda Corros
- 1997–1998 Jenifer Gabrillos
- 1998–2000 Cynette Lovelyn Mirasol and Marie Gabrielle Laguna
- 2000–2001 Romeo Montoya, Jr. and Jakeson Florido
- 2001–2002 Jakeson Florido and Cyril Paulmitan
- 2002–2003 Cyril Paulmitan and Jodelen Ortiz
- 2003–2004 Jodelen Ortiz and Rossbelle Maestro
- 2004–2005 Rogelio Gabiano, Jr. and Karine Tropel
- 2005–2006 Rogelio Gabiano, Jr. and Rossbelle Maestro
- 2006–2008 Johnny Esmilla, Jr.
- 2008–2009 Pietros Val Patricio
- 2009–2010 Pietros Val Patricio and Jefferson Magbanua
- 2010–2011 Jefferson Magbanua and Donna Isabelle Fresnido
- 2011–2012 Mary Leslie S. Eregia and Ray Adrian C. Macalalag
- 2012–2013 Ray Adrian C. Macalalag and Josefa Maria A. Castro
- 2013–2014 Ray Adrian C. Macalalag and Ric Martin L. Libo-on
- 2014–2015 Joyce Gem M. Cañete and Joel S. Sastrillo
- 2015–2016 Stephanie Kay L. Urquiola and Kevin Jerrol C. Erebaren
- 2016–2017 Frennie M. Tababa
- 2017–2018 Rj Junsay
- 2018–2019 Rj Junsay
- 2019–2020 Romari Charlz F. Diaz
- 2020-2021 Emy Rose Gallego
- 2021-2022 Emy Rose Gallego
- 2022-2023 Hannah Jhanylle C. Po
- 2023-2024 Pia Victoria E. Graza
- 2024-2024 Mia Hart I. Jaranilla and Mary Colleen Faith J. Salcedo
- 2025-present Mary Colleen Faith J. Salcedo and Joewen Ray L. Ducado

== Notes and references ==
=== References ===
- New IRF Young Professionals Leadership Team, International Road Federation Geneva Programme Center, 2021
- Ilonggo engineer to present research on 26th World Road Congress, Iloilo Today, 2019
- Top 20 Travel Blogs in the Philippines, Tripzilla, 2018
- 'Grand Prize Winners'. 2015 Vision Petron Folio, II, 64. November 2015, Petron Corporation, 2015
- Lizada, Wilhelm C. (2012), 'Publications reign victorious in reg’l COPRE'. The Augustinian, LVIII, 2, December 22, 2012 Issue., USA Publications
- Han, Seulgi J. (2012), 'USA Pub invades nationals big time. The Augustinian, LVIII, 2, December 22, 2012 Issue, USA Publications
- Yap, Jesanny I. (2012), 'USA Pub goes green, modern'. The Augustinian, LVIII, 1, October 30, 2012 Issue, USA Publications
- Esleyer, James Marthy (2011), 'CPMT, CEA studes lead Pub staff'. The Augustinian, LVII, 1, June–August 2011, USA Publications
- Barrios, Kevin George (2010), 'USA Pub goes online'. The Augustinian, LVI, 1, June–October 2010, USA Publications
- Macalalag, Ray C. (2010), 'USA Pub holds last San Ag Press Awards'. The Augustinian, LV, 5, February–March 2010, USA Publications
- Padisio, Aljun (2009), 'USA Pub eyes comeback in COPRE'. The Augustinian, LV, 1, June–August 2009, USA Publications
- Funtecha, Henry F. (2009), Universidad de San Agustin in 100 Years (1904–2004): A Historic Review, USA Publishing House, ISBN 978-971-0381-22-7
- 'Research and Publications'. The President's Report, University of San Agustin, 2005
- Arreza, Fr. Rodolfo M. (2004), The University of San Agustin through the Years: Centennial Edition, Libro Agustino
- Arreza, Fr. Rodolfo M. (1994), The University of San Agustin through the Years, Libro Agustino
- Bellosillo, Anita D. (1979), 'A Mirror for All Season'. The Augustinian Mirror, XXXIV, 2, Special Diamond Jubilee Issue, December 1979, USA Publications
- Levy, Rene (1934), 'The Augustinian Mirror History'. The Augustinian Mirror, II, 9–10. Graduation and Silver Jubilee, April 1934, USA Publications
