= The Central Echo =

The Central Echo Central Echo
- Type: Student Publication
- Format: Tabloid, Magazine, Literary Folio, Newsletter, Art Folio, Wall News, E-Newsletter, Lampoon
- Founded: 1910
- Headquarters: 3rd floor, Dr. Alfonso Uy Student Union Building, Central Philippine University, Jaro, Iloilo City, Philippines
- Website: https://issuu.com/centralecho

The Central Echo, also known as CE or Central Echo, is the official student media of Central Philippine University. It was founded in 1910, five years after Central's forerunner, the Jaro Industrial School, opened. The Central Echo is one of the oldest student publications in the Philippines.

Established originally as The Hoe, The Central Echo has evolved to be one of the best college student publications in the Western Visayas region: It has been recognized as Second Best Magazine and Fifth Best Newspaper by the Philippine Information Agency-Region 6 in 2009. Central Echo circulates twice in a regular semester and a summer literary folio every summer, but turned into a wide range of publications with tabloid and recently released Paraw, an art portfolio of the publication.

== History ==
The Central Echo started out as an informative bulletin board named "The Hoe" in 1910 when Rev. William Valentine, the founding father of Central Philippine University, founded it. The Hoe underwent a "level-up" in 1916 as it was named "The Jaro Echo" with Mr. Ernesto Gumban and Mr. Benigno Hiñolan as Editors-in-Chief. From that moment, the publication used six (6) legal-sized papers to document important events which transpired and shaped the university's past. For the record, the staff reproduced only 200 copies to serve the school's growing population of 150 boys, all were working students. Later, it evolved into a tabloid in the 1920s.

In 1921, the first commencement exercises was held with 17 graduates, thus the school yearbook was founded – "The Classbook" now known as "The Centralite". This time, Jaro Industrial School became Central Philippine School but was formally changed to Central Philippine College as it opened its tertiary education, thus, the change in name from "The Jaro Echo" to "The Central Echo."

=== World War II ===
The Central Echo also experienced its "dark ages" as it was suspended for nearly five years as it witnessed the pangs of death during the Second World War. The university was totally devastated as Japanese bombed the school leaving only the ruins of the Anna V. Johnson Memorial Hall among all the other structures inside the campus.

The Director for Academic Programs, Mr. Alfredo Catedral initiated the revival of the student publication as Central Philippine College re-opened in 1945 shortly after Iloilo City was cleared of Japanese soldiers.

On August 1, 1953 during the board meeting of the Board of Trustees, Central Philippine College officially became Central Philippine University – with Dr. Almus Oliver Larsen as the new president of the university. Dr. Larsen, being a book author and an advocate of free press strengthened the university's support to The Central Echo by providing it with sufficient funds to continue its operations.

=== Marcos era ===
Martial Law was declared on September 21, 1972 as President Ferdinand Marcos issued Proclamation No. 1081 which placed the entire nation in military control. In spite the President's call to censor all publications including campus papers, CE stood still exposing its audacity and courage as it continued to publish its views against the Marcos' dictatorship.

=== At present ===
The publication had undergone series of transformations since then. Now, Central Echo is being published in tabloid, magazine, folio, wall news, and online formats – providing Centralians with a medium anchored with the university's motto of Scientia et Fides (Science and Faith) – incorporating academic excellence and values formation in one glance.
