= John Iremil Teodoro =

Filipino writer

- Born: 14 November 1973 (age 52); San Jose de Buenavista, Antique, Philippines
- Education: University of San Agustin; De La Salle University
- Occupations: writer teacher; literary critic cultural scholar translator
- Years active: 1993-present

John Iremil Teodoro (born 14 November 1973, in Maybato Norte, San Jose de Buenavista, Antique, Philippines) is a Filipino writer, creative writing and literature teacher, literary critic, translator, and cultural scholar. He is also considered to be a leading pioneer in Philippine gay literature and the most published author in Kinaray-a.

Born to a middle-class family in Antique province, Teodoro gained early recognition as a creative writer since his college years. His father is an international ship captain and his mother a full-time housewife. He writes in four languages, namely English, Filipino, Hiligaynon and Kinaray-a.

== Career ==
He is a member of the Alon Collective and the Tabig/Hubon Manunulat Antique. Many of his literary works have been published in some of the country's leading journals, magazines, and newspapers. His poems have been published and translated ito English by Virginia Poet Laureate Luisa A. Igloria in international online literary journals like Qarrtsiluni and Plume Poetry.

Teodoro is a five-time awardee of the Palanca Awards and has published countless books of fiction and poetry. He obtained his bachelor's degree in biology from the University of San Agustin in Iloilo City and completed an MFA degree in creative writing and a PhD in Literature from the De La Salle University-Manila where he is now teaching creative writing, literature, and art appreciation since 2016.

== Literary career ==
He received the Literature Grant of the Cultural Center of the Philippines and Gawad Ka Amado in 1993 for his early attempts in Filipino poetry. His first full-length play in Filipino Unang Ulan ng Mayo (The First Rain of May) won 2nd Place at the 1997 Don Carlos Palanca Memorial Awards for Literature. He later worked as a journalist for Bandillo ng Palawan-Edisyong Filipino in Puerto Princesa City, a publication devoted to environmental issues in the province of Palawan.

In 2001, he returned to Iloilo City and taught literature as an assistant professor at the University of San Agustin where he became the founding coordinator of the Fray Luis de Leon Creative Writing Institute, managing director of the University of San Agustin Publishing House and moderator of the student publications. He also initiated the establishment of the annual San Agustin Writers Workshop to promote creative writing in Western Visayas. He edited SanAg Literary Journal, a journal primarily devoted to the new works of writers in or from Western Visayas writing in Aklanon, Hiligaynon, Kinaray-a, Filipino, and English.

His full-length play Belasyon, which dramatizes the country's diaspora, was staged at the Cultural Center of the Philippines in 2003 as part of the University of San Agustin Centennial Commission's activities. In 2004, he was recognized as one of the Outstanding Augustinians of the Century for his lifetime achievement in culture and the arts. His poetry book Kung ang Tula ay Pwedeng Pambili ng Lalake (If Poems Could Buy Men) was shortlisted for the 2006 Manila Critics Circle National Book Award.

On 20 February 2008, Unang Ulan ng Mayo (The First Rain of May) was premiered by the De La Salle University - Harlequin Theatre Guild at the Tanghalang Huseng Batute, Cultural Center of the Philippines. On 9–11 October 2008, the play was re-staged by the guild at the College of Saint Benilde, School of Design and Arts, Black Box. That same year, his essay collection, Pagmumuni-muni at Pagtatalak ng Sirenang Nagpapanggap na Prinsesa (Thoughts and Angry Ramblings of a Siren Pretending to be a Princess), won the Manila Critics Circle National Book Award for creative non-fiction whereas shortly after, he was bestowed the Bugal kang Anitique (Pride of Antique) Award for Culture and the Arts from the Antique Provincial Government.

In 2015, he represented the Philippines to the ASEAN Literary Festival in Jakarta, Indonesia together with Philippine National Artist for Literature Virgilio Almario and Bicolano writer Kristian Sendon Cordero.

Teodoro was elected secretary general of Unyon ng mga Manunulat sa Pilipinas (UMPIL) or the Writers Union of the Philippines in 2017. In 2019, he Teodoro won the Southeast Asia or SEAWRITE Award from the Kingdom of Thailand.
