= Southern Luzon State University =

Public university in Quezon, Philippines

- Pamantasang Pampamahalaan ng Timog Luzon (Filipino)
- Other name: SLSU
- Former names: Southern Luzon Polytechnic College (1982–2007); Lucban National College (1972–1982); Lucban Community College (1968–1972); Lucban Municipal Junior High School (1965–1968); Lucban Municipal High School (1964–1965)
- Motto: Aspire, Achieve, Serve
- Type: State University
- Established: August 4, 1964
- Budget: Php 501,414,000 (2022); Php 401,263,000 (2021); Php 287,633,000 (2020); Php 471,844,000 (2019)
- Chairperson: Myrna Q. Mallari, DBA, ASEAN CPA
- President: Frederick T. Villa, DTech
- Vice-president: Dhenalyn Aquino-Dejelo, PhD (Academics); Arvin N. Natividad, DIT (Admin. & Finance); Marissa Cadao-Esperal, PhD (REPDI)
- Location: Brgy. Kulapi, Lucban, Quezon (Main Campus), Philippines; 14°06′44″N 121°33′39″E
- Campus: 11 campuses (Lucban, Lucena, Tayabas, Tiaong, Tagkawayan, Polillo, Infanta, Alabat, Catanauan, Gumaca, Calauag)
- Language: English, Filipino
- Colors: Green and White
- Nickname: Green Rangers
- Sporting affiliations: SCUAA, PASUC
- Website: www.slsu.edu.ph
- Location in Luzon Location in the Philippines

Southern Luzon State University (SLSU; Filipino: Pamantasang Pampamahalaan ng Timog Luzon), formerly known as Southern Luzon Polytechnic College (SLPC), is the premier, state-funded higher education institution in Quezon Province in the Philippines operating by virtue of Republic Act 9395. It is composed of 11 campuses in the province of Quezon, with the main campus situated in the Municipality of Lucban.

SLSU is mandated to provide advanced education, professional, technological instruction in the fields of allied medicine, education, engineering, agriculture, fisheries, forestry, environment, arts and sciences, accountancy, cooperative, business and entrepreneurship, technology and other relevant fields of study in the province of Quezon and in Region IV-A CALABARZON. It is also mandated to undertake research and extension services and provide progressive leadership in its areas of specialization. By virtue of Republic Act 10931 or the Universal Access to Quality Tertiary Education Act signed by President Rodrigo Duterte, SLSU will no longer be collecting tuition fees from its local, first degree undergraduate students.

== History ==
Southern Luzon State University (SLSU) started as Lucban Municipal Junior High School by virtue of Municipal Resolution No. 5 passed in April 1964. Through the initiative of its founding president, Dr. Angelo Peña, a letter signed by 257 petitioners seeking the establishment of a Municipal Junior High School was favorably received and recommended by the Municipal Council and then Mayor Hobart Dator. The permit to operate was bestowed by Assistant Secretary of Education, Hon. Miguel Gaffud in July 1964. Since then, the Municipal Council allocated funds for its operations. Due to its expanding student population, Municipal Resolution No. 18 series of 1966 effectively expropriated about 4.9 ha of land in Barrio Kulapi - a site which the Council initially allocated for the establishment of a public market - in favor of the Municipal High School. This would then become the present site of the main campus of the university.

In May 1965, Municipal Resolution No. 86 was passed requesting the change of name to Lucban Municipal High School to accommodate students into the third and fourth year levels. The Director of Public Schools at the time approved the resolution in August 1965. On June 14, 1968, the Lucban Community College was created and was made part of Lucban Municipal Junior School as an adjunct institution for its School of Education, despite resistance from then Municipal and Provincial Councils for the school to operate as a college. The Municipal and Provincial Councils deemed it to be outside their authority to enact a law that would ensure the continued operation of the Community College.

The Lucban School for Philippine Craftsmen formally started in July 1970. By virtue of Republic Act 4345 also known as the merger law, the Lucban Municipal High School and Lucban School of Philippine Craftsmen became the Lucban National High School in July 1972 (with the continuous operation of Lucban Community College).

On August 30, 1977, President Ferdinand Marcos approved the conversion of the Lucban National High School and Lucban Community College into Lucban National College (LNC). This was in line with his administration's approach to countryside development by bringing Colleges and Universities to the provinces and rural areas. At the time, the LNC was the only government-run and funded College in the Southern Tagalog region.

In 1981, 20 Assemblymen of the Southern Tagalog Region sponsored the Parliamentary Bill No. 173 for the conversion of Lucban National College into Southern Luzon Polytechnic College (SLPC). The bill was approved in December 1981 and was signed into law known as Batas Pambansa No. 145 by President Marcos.

Since then, SLPC grew to establish seven satellite campuses located in various parts of the province of Quezon. The first satellite campus was inaugurated in Alabat in July 1991. In 1991, SLPC-Polilio was created by virtue of Board Resolution No. 19, Series of 1992. In the following year, two additional campuses were established: SLPC-Sampaloc in Brgy. Caldong, Sampaloc, Quezon (BOT Res. No. 33, series of 1993) and SLPC-Infanta. In 1996, another campus, the SLPC-Lucena Dual Training and Livelihood Center, was established under Board Resolution No. 130, series of 1996. Judge Guillermo Eleazar Polytechnic College was integrated in February 2002 under Board Resolution No. 352, series of 2002.

=== Judge Guillermo Eleazar Polytechnic College ===
Judge Guillermo Eleazar Polytechnic College was the former name of the college's satellite campus in Tagkawayan, Quezon. The satellite started as the Tagkawayan School of Fisheries under the Commission on Fisheries by virtue of Republic Act No. 4290 passed by the legislature on June 19, 1965. After 12 years, the school name was changed to Judge Guillermo Eleazar Memorial School of Fisheries by Presidential Decree No. 1273 issued by then president Ferdinand E. Marcos on December 27, 1977. Eventually, with the passage of Republic Act No. 8728, the school was converted into a state college known as Judge Guillermo Eleazar Polytechnic College. On March 17, 2007, through Republic Act No. 9395, it became part of the Southern Luzon State University.

== Awards and Recognitions ==
SLSU is the Commission on Higher Education (CHED) Center of Development in Teacher Education and Forestry. It is also an accredited "Dark Green School", which means that SLSU's instruction, research, and extension activities are geared towards environmental awareness and protection.

In 2018, the university is assessed as a Level III State University by the CHED, a level higher than in the 2007 evaluation. Based on the CHED-Department of Budget and Management Joint Circular, a Level III SUC is "very good in undertaking the functions of a state university/college", that is, instruction, research, and extension. In 2018, the AACCUP recognized SLSU as a top ranking SUC in the Philippines in terms of number of degree programs accredited.

The university has also been recognized by the Professional Regulation Commission (PRC) of the Philippines for top performance in licensure examinations and for producing topnotchers in board examinations in the fields of Nursing, Midwifery, Teacher Education, Forestry, Electrical Engineering, Electronics Technician, Mechanical Engineering, and Accountancy. In fact, in 2015, FindUniversity.PH ranks SLSU as the 17th best performing University in the Philippines, and the 2nd best performing State University in Region IV-A CALABARZON among Philippine Universities with at least 15 PRC Board Examinations.

== Quality Assurance ==
As a State University, SLSU is mandated to submit its programs and services to external audit for quality assurance. In terms of instruction, research, and extension services, periodic survey visits are conducted by the Accrediting Agency for Chartered Colleges and Universities in the Philippines (AACCUP). In terms of its management, it has been evaluated and granted the ISO 9001-2015 Certification for Quality Management System. The university is the first State University in the Southern Tagalog region to be ISO certified for Quality Management System in 2015. The Commission on Higher Education of the Philippines, on the other hand, conducts its in-house Institutional Sustainability Assessment (ISA).

As of May, 2017, 97% of all curricular programs both from the undergraduate and graduate levels in the main campus have been accredited by the Accrediting Agency of Chartered Colleges and Universities in the Philippines (AACCUP). Curricular programs in its satellite campuses in Tagkawayan and Tiaong have likewise been subjected to accreditation visits.

== Colleges, Campuses and degree programs ==
The Lucban main campus is home to five colleges: (1) Allied Medicine, (2) Teacher Education, (3) Arts and Sciences, (4) Administration, Business, Hospitality Management, and Accountancy, (5) Engineering and (6) Agriculture; one institute, the Institute of Human Kinetics, and various research centers for agricultural and environmental research. Starting A.Y. 2020–2021, the College of Industrial Technology will return to operations offering BS in Industrial Technology programs.

SLSU has satellite campuses in: Lucena, Tagkawayan, Alabat, Polillo, Tiaong, and Infanta. New satellite campuses have been/ will be opened in Gumaca, Catanauan, Tayabas, and Calauag.

The university also has key partner educational institutions in the Socialist Republic of Vietnam, Malaysia, and the United States. The partnerships allow educational exchange opportunities among the students and faculty of both parties. The university, together with the International School of Thai Nguyen University in Vietnam offers Joint academic programs in Business Administration, Environmental Science, and English language teaching.

The following lists the academic programs offered by the university in the different colleges in the Lucban main campus and satellite campuses:

Graduate school

Administered by the College of Teacher Education

- PhD Development Education
- PhD Science Education
- PhD Educational Management
- Master of Arts in Educational Management
- Master of Arts in Education (Elementary)
- Master of Arts in Mathematics Education
- Master of Arts in Science Education
- Master of Arts in Teaching English (MATE)

Administered by the College of Arts and Sciences

- Master of Arts in Applied Linguistics
- Master of Arts in Psychology (Clinical Psychology)

Administered by the College of Administration, Business, Hospitality Management and Accountancy

- Doctor in Business Administration
- Master in Business Administration

Administered by the College of Agriculture

- MS Environmental Science
- Master of Science in Forestry (Major in Silviculture & AgroForestry)

Administered by the College of Allied Medicine

- Master of Arts in Nursing (Medical-Surgical Nursing, or Psychiatric Nursing)

International programs

Doctoral programs

- Doctor in Business Administration
- Ph.D. in Educational Management

Master's programs

- Master in Business Administration
- Master of Arts in Teaching English
- Master of Arts in Educational Management
- Master of Science in Environmental Science

Undergraduate programs

- Bachelor of Science in Business Administration major in Financial Management
- Bachelor of Science in Environmental Science

Short courses

- Intensive English Training Program (customized)
- Clinical Enhancement for Nurses Training
- Intensive English Training and Methodology for Teachers

College of Agriculture (CHED Center of Development in Forestry)

- Bachelor of Science in Agriculture
  Major in: Animal Science, Crop Science, Organic Agriculture
- Bachelor of Science in Forestry
- Bachelor of Science in Environmental Science
- Bachelor of Agricultural Technology

College of Administration, Business, Hospitality, and Accountancy

- Bachelor of Science in Accountancy
- Bachelor of Science in Business Administration
  Major in: Marketing Management, Human Resource & Development Management, Financial Management
- Bachelor of Science in Hospitality Management
- Bachelor of Public Administration

College of Allied Medicine

- Bachelor of Science in Nursing
- Bachelor of Science in Radiologic Technology
- Midwifery

College of Engineering

- Bachelor of Science in Computer Engineering
- Bachelor of Science in Electrical Engineering
- Bachelor of Science in Mechanical Engineering
- Bachelor of Science in Civil Engineering
- Bachelor of Science in Electronics Engineering
- Bachelor of Science in Industrial Engineering

College of Arts and Sciences

- Bachelor of Arts in Communication
- Bachelor of Arts major in History
- Bachelor of Arts major in Psychology
- Bachelor of Science in Mathematics major in Statistics
- Bachelor of Science in Biology

College of Teacher Education (CHED Center of Development in Teacher Education)

- Bachelor of Elementary Education
- Bachelor of Secondary Education
  Major in: English, Filipino, Mathematics, MAPEH (Music, Arts, Physical Ed., Health), Physical Science, Social Studies
- Bachelor of Culture and Arts Education
- Bachelor of Technology and Livelihood Education
  Major in: Industrial Arts, Information and Communication Technology, Home Economics

Institute of Human Kinetics

- Bachelor of Physical Education major in Sports and Wellness Management
- Bachelor of Science in Exercise and Sports Sciences

Laboratory Schools

- Elementary School Grades 1-6
- Junior High School Grades 7-10
- Senior High School Grades 11-12 with majors in Humanities & Social Sciences (HUMSS), Accounting, Business & Management (ABM), Science, Technology, Engineering & Mathematics (STEM)

College of Industrial Technology
(to return to full operations starting A.Y. 2020–2021)

- Bachelor of Science in Industrial Technology

Alabat Campus

- Bachelor of Technical-Vocational Education major in Computer Programming

Calauag Campus

- Bachelor of Science in Agriculture

Catanauan Campus

- Bachelor of Elementary Education
- Bachelor of Science in Agriculture

Gumaca Campus

- Bachelor of Technical-Vocational Education major in Computer Programming
- Bachelor of Science in Business Administration
- Bachelor of Secondary Education

Infanta Campus

- Bachelor of Secondary Education major in Mathematics
- Bachelor of Science in Agriculture
- Basic Engineering

Judge Guillermo Eleazar - Tagkawayan Campus

- Bachelor of Elementary Education
- Bachelor of Business Administration
  Major in: Marketing Management, Financial Management
- Bachelor of Secondary Education
  Major in: English, Mathematics, Science
- Bachelor of Science in Fisheries and Aquatic Resources
- Bachelor of Arts in Political Administration
- Bachelor of Science in Industrial Technology major Computer Technology
  Major in Culinary and Food Technology
- Laboratory High School (Grades 7 to 10)

Lucena City Campus

- Bachelor of Technical-Vocational Education
  Major in: Computer Programming, Food & Service Management

Polillo Campus

- Bachelor of Elementary Education

Tayabas City Campus

- Bachelor of Science in Agriculture
- Bachelor of Science in Hospitality Management
- Bachelor of Technology and Livelihood Education major in Computer Programming

Tiaong Campus

- Bachelor of Elementary Education
- Bachelor of Science in Agriculture
  Major in: Crop Science, Organic Agriculture

== Facilities ==
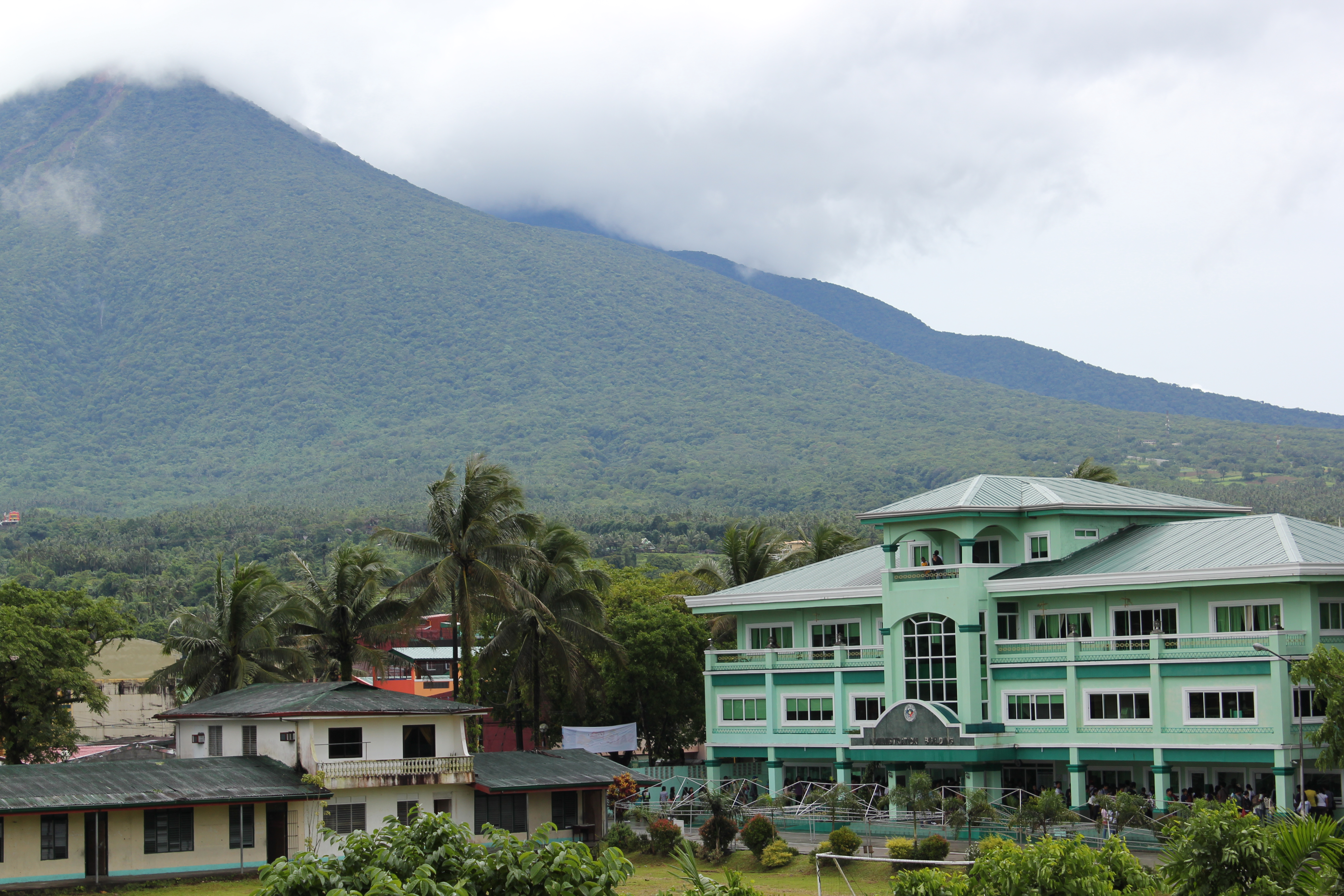
View of SLSU Admin Building & Mt. Banahaw from the College of Engineering Building

Administration Building

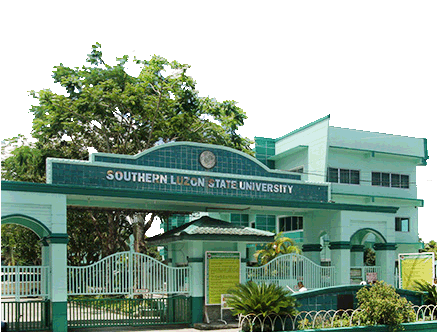
SLSU Gate (Second Gate)

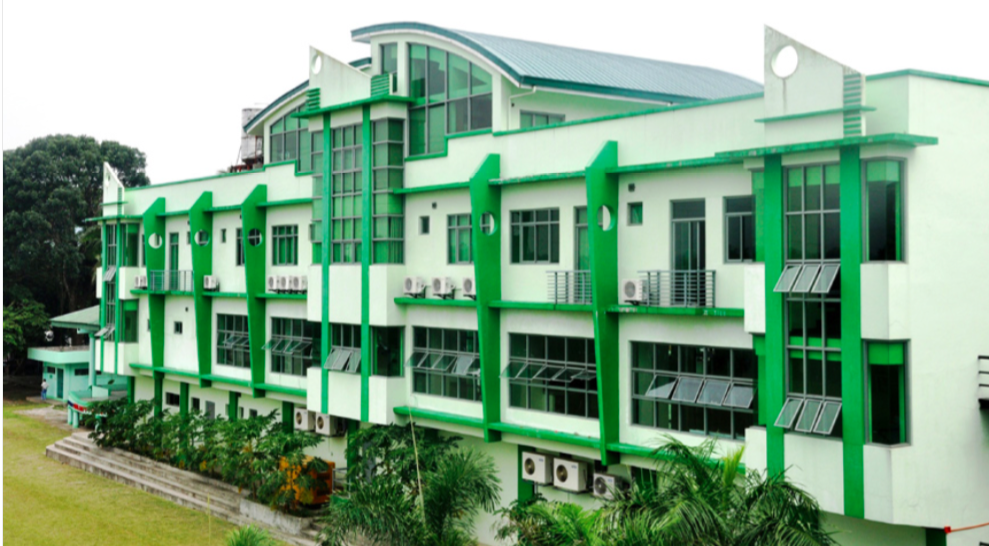
SLSU Business Resource Center & Hotel

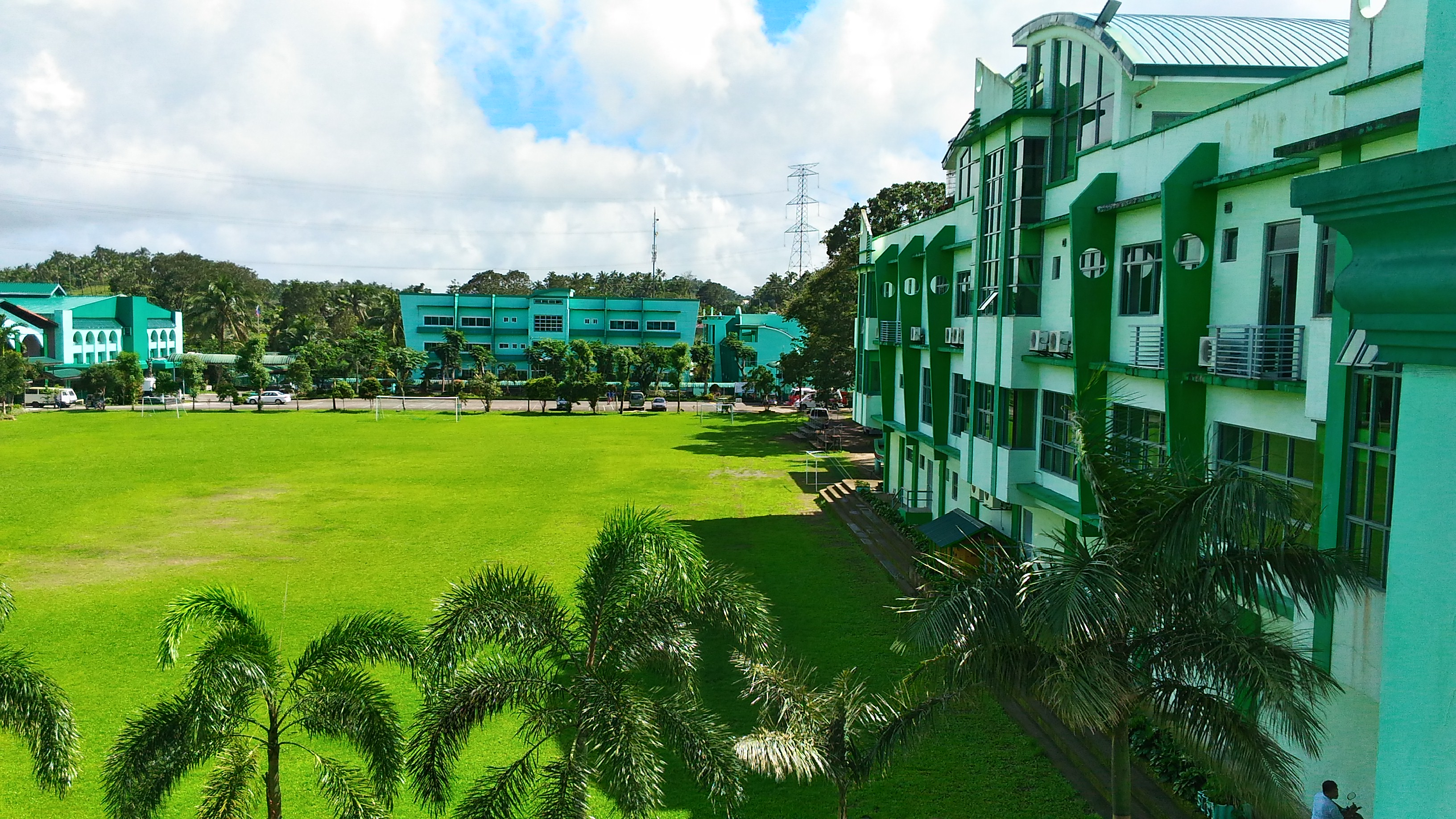
SLSU BRC & Library

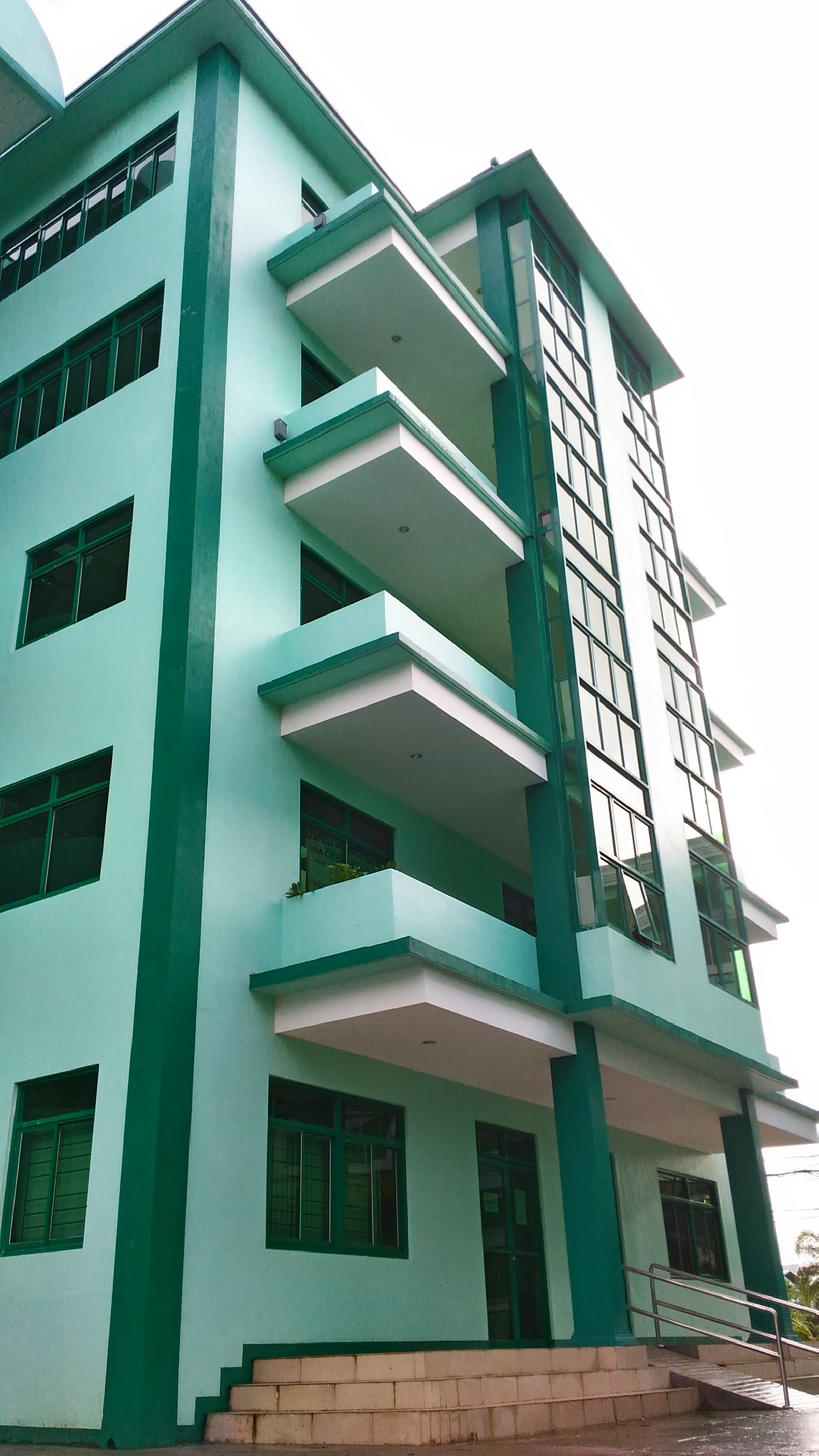
SLSU College of Business Administration Building. It also houses the Communication TV Studio and Radio Station

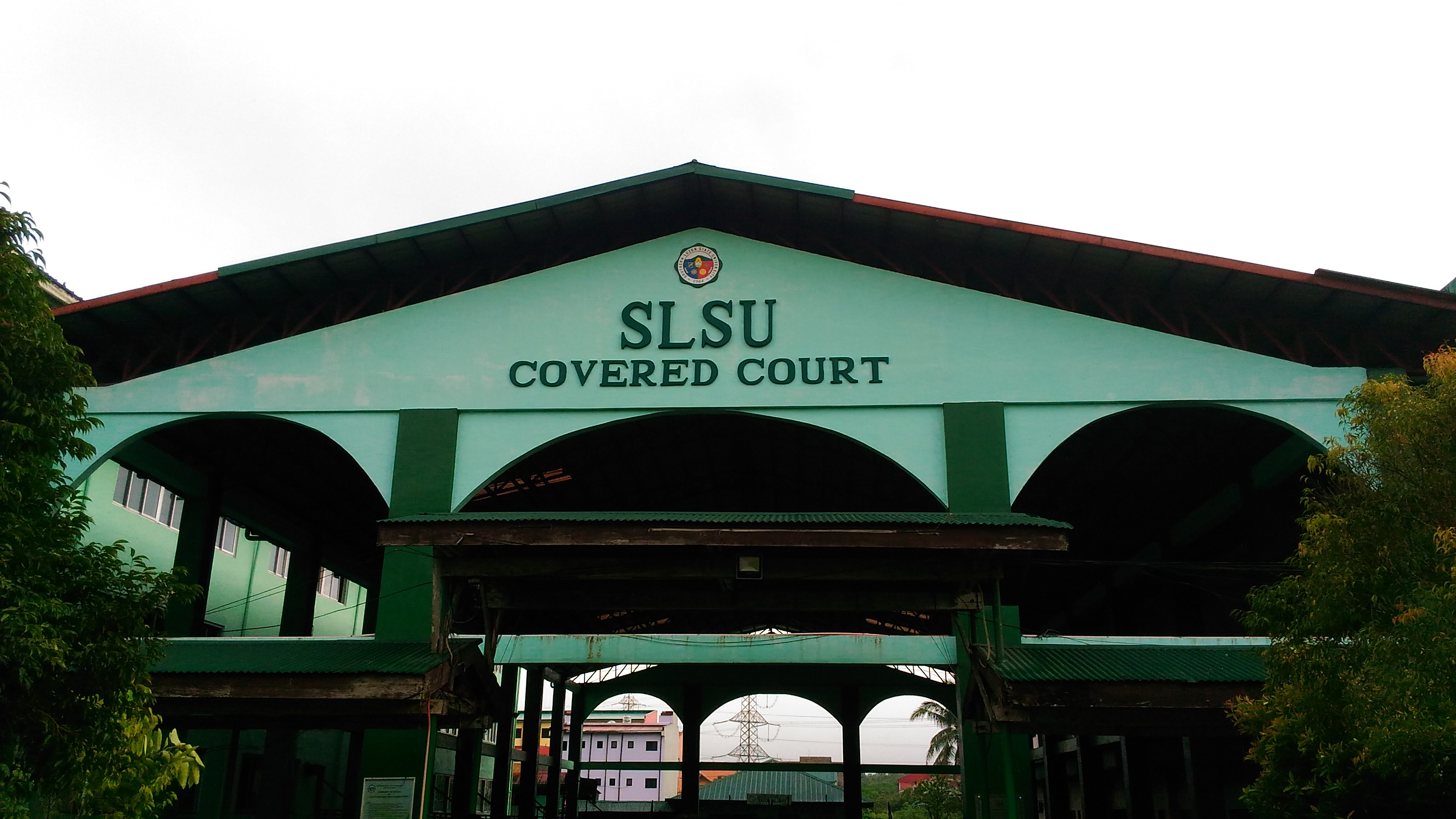
SLSU Covered Court

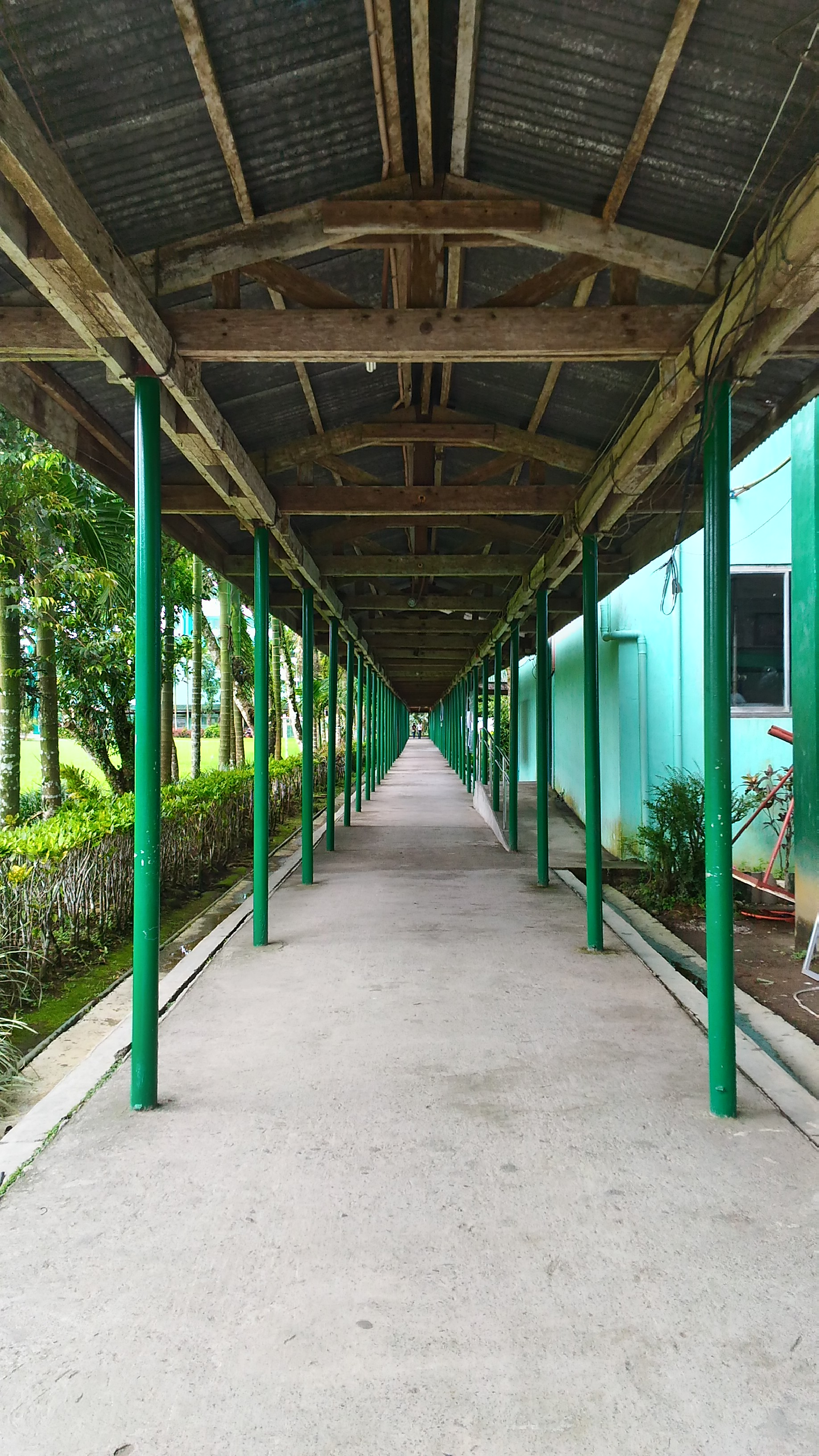
SLSU Covered Walk

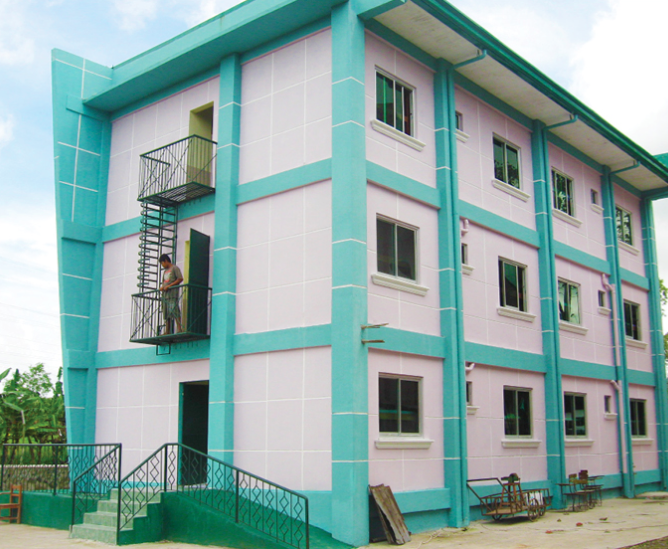
SLSU Dormitory

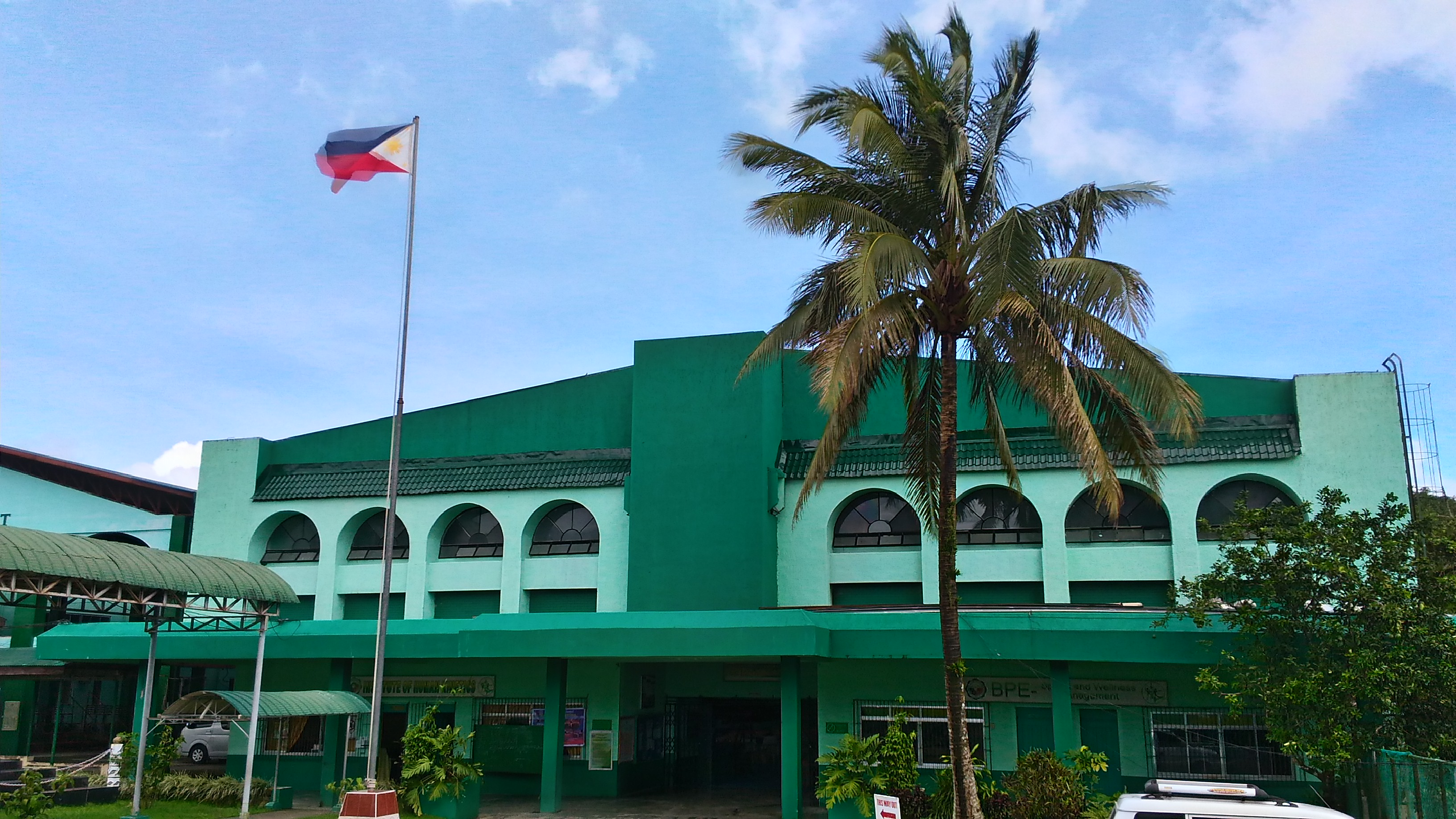
SLSU Gymnasium

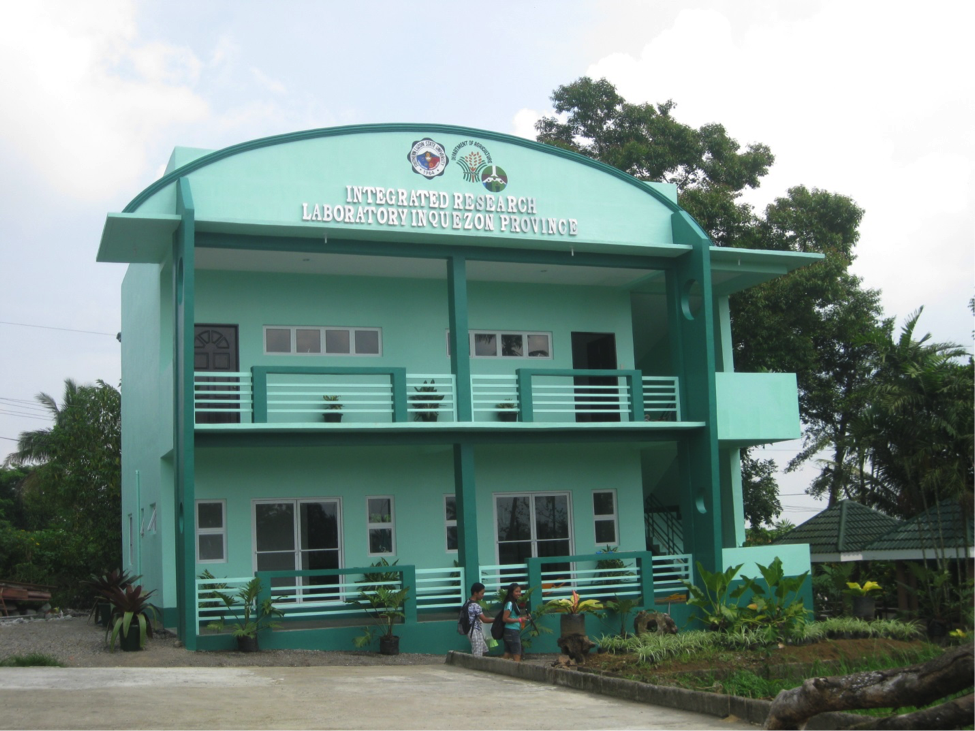
SLSU Integrated Research Laboratory

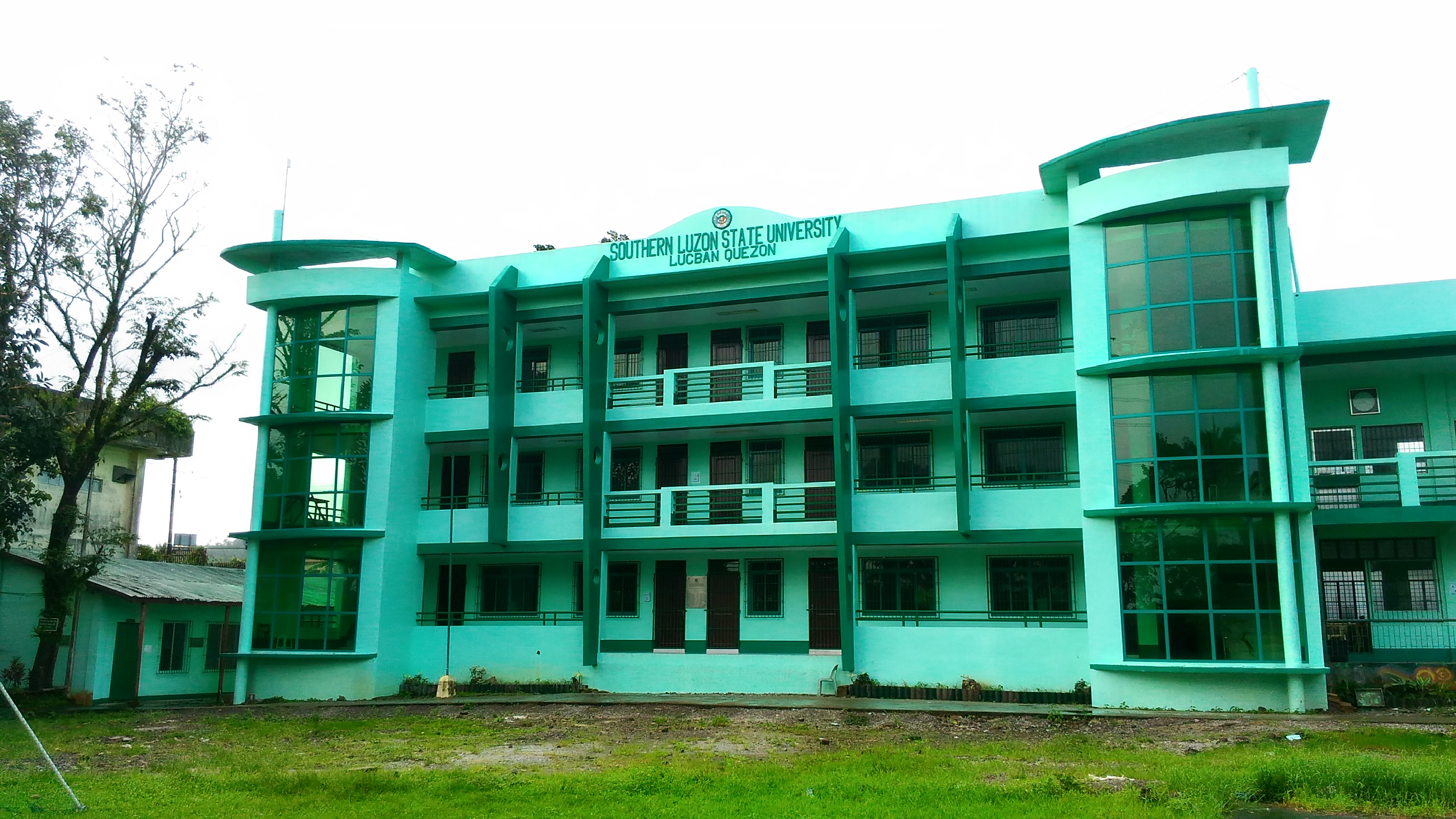
SLSU Science and Technology Building

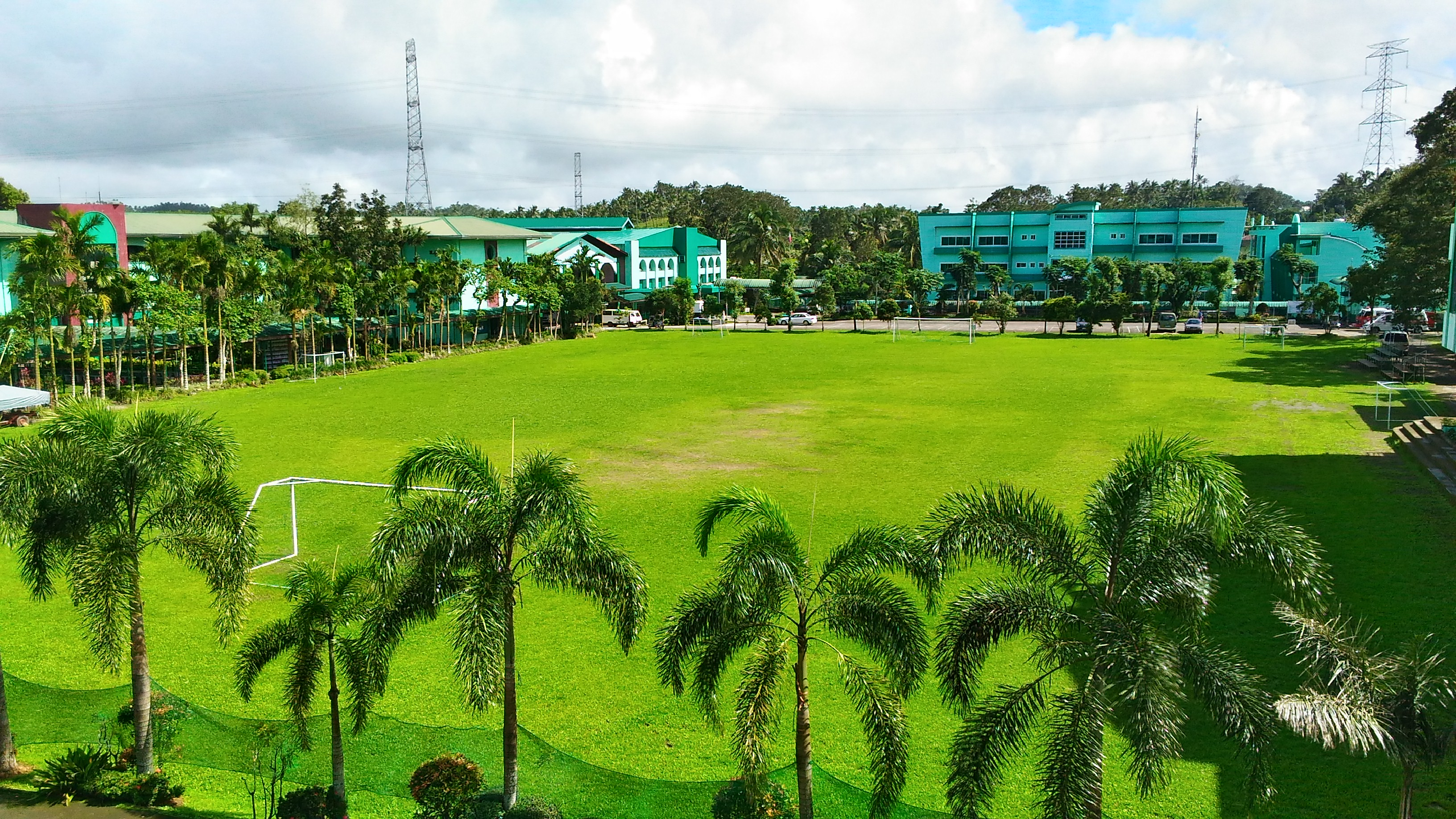
View of SLSU Ground from the Administration Building

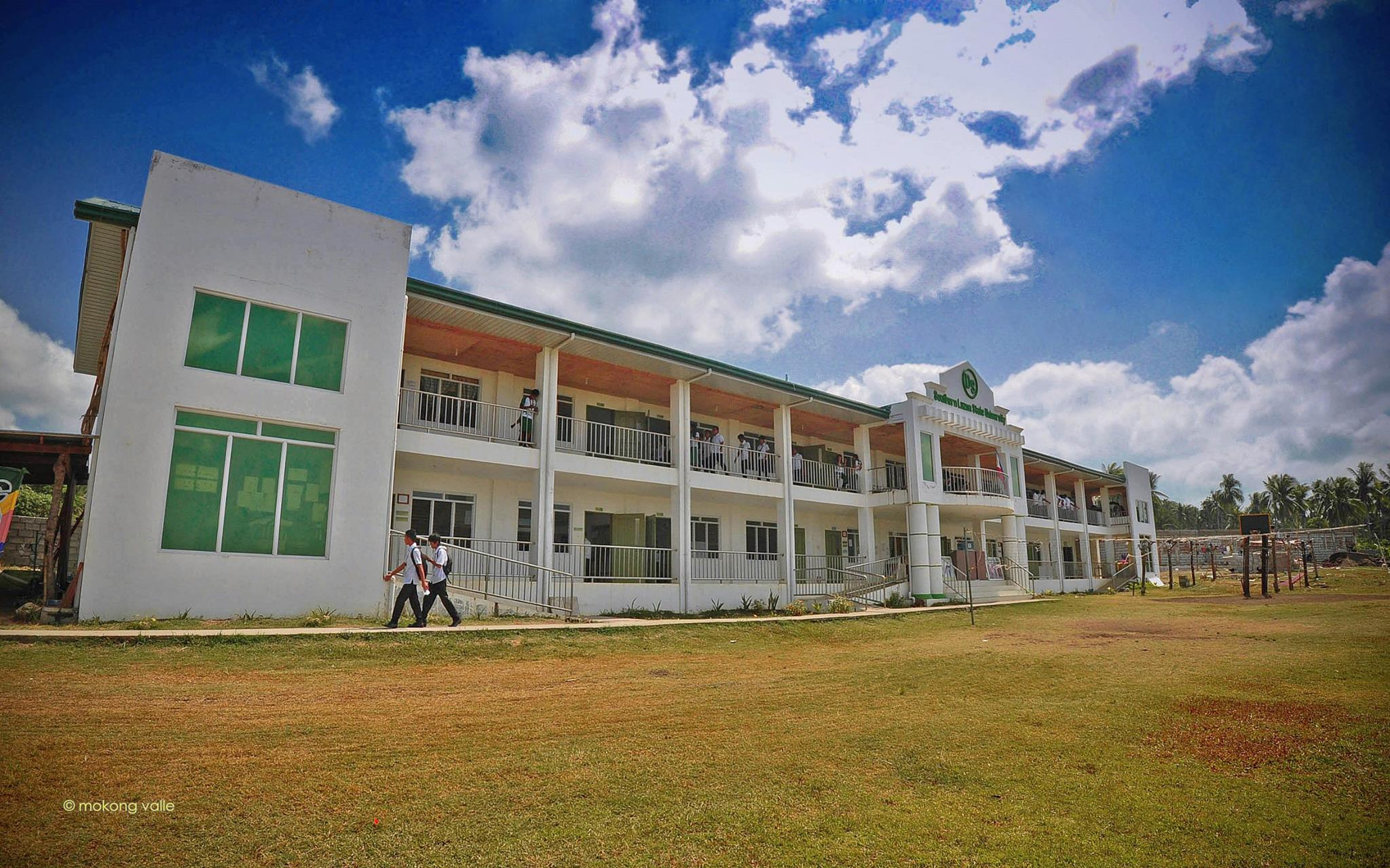
SLSU Catanauan

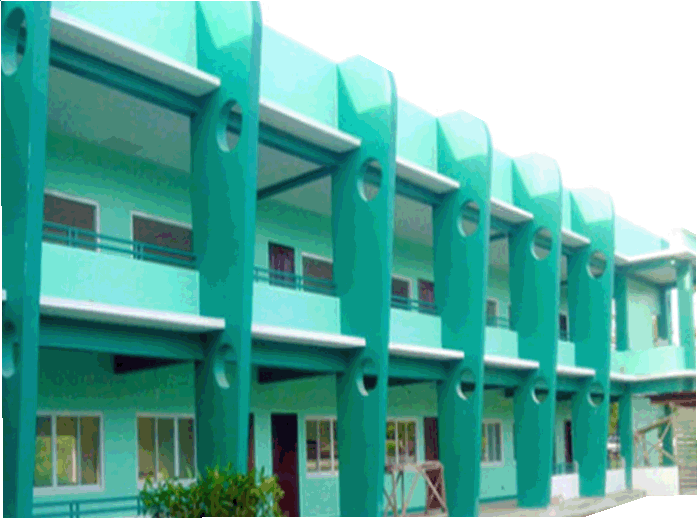
SLSU Lucena

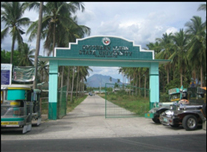
SLSU Tiaong Gate
