= Saint Michael's College of Laguna =

Private college in Laguna, Philippines

Saint Michael's College of Laguna (SMCL)
- Motto: Here at SMCL, we make you the best that you can be.
- Type: Private, Run by Miguelunda Educational Corp.
- Established: August 25, 1975 by Pura Ligaya Limaco (as Biñan College)
- Chairperson: Carmelita De Leon-Chan
- President: Lourdes L. Almeda-Sese, Ed.D.
- Students: approximately 3,000
- Location: Biñan, Laguna, Philippines; 14°19′29″N 121°05′35″E
- Campus: Suburban, 1.3 hectares
- Colors: Red, Blue, and White
- Nicknames: Michaeleans, Angels
- Website: www.smcl.edu.ph

- Location in Laguna Location in Luzon Location in the Philippines

Saint Michael's College of Laguna (SMCL) is an autonomous college in Biñan, Laguna, Philippines, formerly known as Biñan College. SMCL was founded by the nine Limaco sisters, on August 25, 1975. Luisa Limaco-De Leon provided the idea of building the school, Pura Limaco financed the school's operations, while Milagros Limaco, a teacher, was later elected as the chairman of the board and director of the school. The school was named after the Limaco patriarch, Miguel, a philanthropist.

In 2008, the Philippine Association of Colleges and Universities Commission on Accreditation (PACUCOA), awarded SMCL with a Level III Reaccreditation Status for its Liberal Arts, Business Administration and Teacher Education (Elementary and Secondary) programs. In 2010, the Nursing, Grade School, and High School programs received Level I Formal Accreditation. It was also granted Deregulated Status by the Commission on Higher Education (CHED) in 2003 which was retained for another five years starting in 2009 through a Commission en banc decision. SMCL is also an ISO 9001:2015 certified educational institution.

== Academic programs ==
Tertiary Education Division

- School of Education, Arts and Sciences
  - Bachelor of Secondary Education, majors: English, Filipino, Social Studies, and Mathematics; Bachelor of Elementary Education, Bachelor of Early Childhood Education; Bachelor of Arts in English Language; Bachelor of Arts in Filipino Language; Bachelor of Science in Psychology
- School of Nursing
  - Bachelor of Science in Nursing
- School of Business, Management, and Information Technology
  - Bachelor of Science in Business Administration, major: Marketing Management, Bachelor of Science in Hospitality Management; Bachelor of Science in Computer Science; Associate in Computer Technology

Basic Education Division

- K to 12 (Integrated School - Kinder to Grade 10; Senior High School (Grade 11 to Grade 12 - STEM, HESS, ABM, GAS)

== Accreditation and Certification ==
The Philippine Association of Colleges and Universities Commission on Accreditation (PACUCOA) accredited all programs of the school. The Federation of Accrediting Agencies of the Philippines (FAAP) certified the grant.

- Level IV
  - Bachelor of Elementary Education
  - Bachelor of Secondary Education
  - Bachelor of Arts
  - Bachelor of Science in Business Administration
- Level III Reaccreditation
  - Bachelor of Science in Nursing
  - SMCL High School
  - SMCL Grade School
  - Bachelor of Science in Hospitality Management
- Level II 1st Reaccreditation
  - Bachelor of Science in Computer Science

== Corporate social responsibility ==
The outreach arm of the school is Lingkod at Pagmamahal ng Saint Michael's College of Laguna Foundation, Inc. (LINGAP-SMCL). LINGAP-SMCL is responsible for the HEAL (Health and Sanitation, Education and Empowerment, Advocacy and Social Awareness, and Livelihood Opportunities) Program. A study on the program's effect to its beneficiaries was accepted in the 4th International Barcelona Conference on Higher Education (2008) of the Global University Network for Innovation (GUNI). SMCL is also a Gawad Kalinga partner (GK1MB school).

== Academic Exchange and International Opportunities ==
SMCL is a member of the Association of Southeast Asian Institutions of Higher Learning (ASAIHL)

== Student life ==
Notable student organizations are the following:

- TED Central Student Council (Highest governing council of the Tertiary Education Division)
- Central Student Council (Highest governing council of the Basic Education Division)
- SMCL Golden Z Club (Winner for several years, Emma Conlon International Award for Service)
- Z Club of Laguna (Winner for several years, Emma Conlon International Award for Service)
- Michaelean Theater and Dance Co. (Cultural/performing arts group, July 11, 2011 Winner, Showtime - ABS-CBN) (Defunct)
- SMCL Dance Company (Cultural/performing arts group)
- SMCL Drum and Lyre Corps (Cultural/performing arts group)
- Tanghalang Michaelean (Cultural/performing arts group)
- The Michaelean Herald/Pahayagang Miguel (Official student publication, winner in the National Schools Press Conference and Best Culture Writing Page of the National Commission for Culture and the Arts (Philippines))
- Archangels Pep Squad/Blue Angels Dance Squad (Finalist, NCC Philippines) (Defunct)
- SMCL Arachangels Varsity Team
- Michaelean Film Collective (2020 Finalist, Documentary Section, Gawad CCP para sa Alternatibong Pelikula at Video)

== Institutional Affiliations ==
- Philippine Association of Colleges and Universities (PACU)
- Philippine Association of Private Schools, Colleges, and Universities (PAPSCU)
- Association of Southeast Asian Institutions of Higher Learning (ASAIHL)
- Laguna Inter-institutional Consortium
- PAPSCU Excellent Academic Research Link
- CALABARZON Research Council
- Philippine Society for Educational Research and Evaluation
- Coordinating Council for Private Educational Associations (COCOPEA)
- International Association of Student Affairs and Services (IASAS)

== Notable alumni ==
- Board Placers
  - Jenechielle S. Lopoy (Top 1 2022 LET Exam)
- Culture and the Arts
  - Clark Rambuyon (Dance)
  - Silver Dan Belen (Film, Media)
  - Herald Chavez (Film, TV, Media)
  - Ryuji "Rui" Fortuna (TV, Modelling)
  - Bea Nicolas (TV, Film)
  - Typecast (band) Steve Badiola and Melvin Macatiag (Music)
  - T-Jay Medina (Palanca awardee)
  - Jeffrey Hernandez and Mac Amarante (Theater)
  - Winona Yapit-Diola (Metrobank Outstanding Teacher)
  - Eleuterio F. Timbol Jr.(2021 Empire State Excellence in Teaching Award -NY, USA, AFTA New York City Ulirang Guro Awardee 2015 and 2024 SLOAN STEM Teaching Awardee)
- Business
  - Ma. Guia Lopez de Leon (Most Outstanding Youth of Laguna 2005)
  - Anthony Almeda (President, National Grid Corporation of the Philippines)
