= Polytechnic University of the Philippines Taguig =

Public university in Taguig, Philippines

- Politeknikong Unibersidad ng Pilipinas Taguig (Filipino)
- Motto: Tanglaw ng Bayan
- Motto in English: Light of the Nation
- Type: Satellite campus
- Established: 1992
- Academic affiliations: ASAIHL, AACCUP, IAU
- President: Manuel Muhi
- Director: Marissa B. Ferrer
- Academic staff: 100+
- Administrative staff: 50+
- Students: 68,896 estimated total including all the campuses
- Location: Gen. Santos Avenue, Central Bicutan, Taguig City, Philippines; 14°29′18″N 121°03′06″E
- Campus: Urban, 25 acres (10 ha)
- Colors: Maroon and gold
- Nickname: Taguig Titans
- Sporting affiliations: SCUAA
- Mascots: Titans, Pylon
- Website: www.pup.edu.ph/taguig
- Location in Manila Location in Luzon Location in the Philippines

The Polytechnic University of the Philippines Taguig (PUPT) is a satellite campus of the Polytechnic University of the Philippines located at Taguig, Philippines and was established in 1992. The site in which the campus sits was reserved exclusively for the use and disposition of the university through the proclamation of President Ferdinand Marcos in 1967.

== Campus ==
The 10-hectare (25-acre) campus of PUP Taguig is located at Lower Bicutan, Taguig. The site was reserved in 1967 through a Presidential Declaration, although development for the campus started in the 1990s, almost 30 years since the Presidential Declaration. Among the buildings and structures inside the campus are: the Marichu Rodriguez Tiñga Building, otherwise known as Building A; the Cayetano Building, which houses the Engineering Center; school's library, and the school's auditorium; the Students Center, otherwise known as Building B is where the offices of accredited organizations are located. The chemistry laboratory are also located within this building; the school's gymnasium; and the interfaith chapel. Other development in the campus includes the Zonta Park, the main and primary park and recreation area of the school.
