= United Central Luzon Athletic Association =

Collegiate sports organization in the Philippines

- Upcoming season or competition: UCLAA Season 11
- Founded: 2008
- No. of teams: 14
- Country: Philippines
- Venue: Central Luzon
- Broadcasters: CLTV 36; Smart Sports

The United Central Luzon Athletic Association (UCLAA) is an association of colleges and universities in Central Luzon region aiming to showcase the skills of student-athletes in different sports. It was formally introduced in 2015 in San Fernando, Pampanga coinciding with the formal opening of the 8th season.

It is one of the member leagues of the Philippine Collegiate Champions League (PCCL).

== Members ==
As of 2017, its membership includes: University of Assumption-Pampanga, Holy Angel University, System Philippines College Foundation, and Guagua National Colleges

Bulacan

- Bulacan State University
- Marian College of Baliwag
- First City Providential College

Pampanga

- University of the Assumption
- Guagua National Colleges
- Holy Angel University
- Pampanga State University
- Systems Plus College Foundation
- Our Lady of Fatima University
- St. Nicolas College of Business and Technology

Nueva Ecija

- Nueva Ecija University of Science and Technology

Tarlac

- Tarlac State University
- Tarlac Agricultural University

Zambales

- Lyceum of Subic Bay
