= 2010 National Cheerleading Championship =

2010 Philippine cheerleading competition

The 5th Season of National Cheerleading Championships reached another milestone by giving special slots to 2009 NCAA Cheerleading Competition, where top three winners will compete in this season's National Finals.

== 2010 NCAA Cheerleading Competition ==
Rank	School name	Basic Elements	Tumbling	Stunts	Tosses	Pyramids	Deductions	Total
1	University of Perpetual Help System Dalta	68.5	68	63	67	69	0	335.5
2	Jose Rizal University	55	57.5	66.5	68	67	(3)	311
3	Emilio Aguinaldo College	45.5	51	48	57	48.5	(6)	244
4	San Sebastian College - Recoletos	40.5	44.5	49	57.5	58.5	(7)	000
5	Mapua Institute of Technology	54.5	46	52	54.5	54.5	(25)	236.5
6	Angeles University Foundation	34	50	50	55	45	(20)	214
7	De La Salle - College of St. Benilde	46	55.5	46	47.5	40.5	(41)	194.5
8	Arellano University	30.5	40.5	44.5	44.5	35	(26)	169
9	Colegio de San Juan de Letran	45	42	42.5	46.5	38.5	(46)	168.5
10	San Beda College	29	39.5	42.5	44.5	28.5	(36)	148

Legend:

Qualified for finals

== Regional qualifiers ==
=== Central Luzon ===
Held at University of Assumption in San Fernando, Pampanga, on October 25, 2009

==== High school ====
Rank	Team name	Basic Elements	Tumbling	Stunts	Tosses	Pyramids	Deductions	Total
1	Tarlac State University – Laboratory School; TSU Laboratory School Blue Eagles Pep Squad	57	50.5	69	51	71.5	(14)	285
2	Tarlac National High School	44.5	50	55.5	50.5	61	(10)	251.5
3	University of the Assumption High School	33	34	50	36	50	(23)	180
4	Trinitas College	29.5	30.5	45	28	35	(14)	154

Legend:

Qualified for Finals

==== College ====
Rank	Team name	Basic Elements	Tumbling	Stunts	Tosses	Pyramids	Deductions	Total
1	Tarlac State University; TSU CBA Cheerleading Squad	56	61.5	65	55	69	(5)	301.5
2	Araullo University - PHINMA	58	38	67	54	55	(7)	265
3	Angeles University Foundation; AUF Pep Squad	51	41.5	61.5	51.5	64.5	(21)	249
4	University of Assumption	41	39	62.5	54	42	(13)	225.5
5	Holy Angels University	49	42	59	58.5	51.5	(35)	225
6	Wesleyan University	53	45.5	53.5	52	44.5	(26)	221.5
7	College of Immaculate Concepcion	40	33.5	53	44.5	30.5	(51)	150.5

Legend:

Qualified for Finals

=== Mindanao ===
Held at Xavier University - Ateneo de Cagayan in Cagayan de Oro, on November 15, 2009

==== High school ====
Rank	School	Basic Elements	Tumbling	Stunts	Pyramids	Tosses	Deductions	Total
1	Pilgrim Christian College	33	41	49	56	61.5	(5)	235.5
2	Misamis Oriental General Comprehensive High School	39	43.5	52.5	30	60.5	0	225.5
3	Bukidnon National High School	41	39.5	42	42	59	(12)	211.5

Legend:

Qualified for Finals

==== College ====
Rank	School	Basic Elements	Tumbling	Stunts	Pyramids	Tosses	Deductions	Total
1	Xavier University - Ateneo de Cagayan; XU Crusader Cheer Force	66	59	65.5	59	53.5	(3)	320
2	Iligan Medical Center College	62	50	60	55	68.5	(1)	294.5
3	Notre Dame of Dadiangas University; NDDU Sarimanok Pep Squad	46.5	50	59	54	66	(3)	272.5
4	Mindanao State University - Iligan Institute of Technology	57	48	64	48.5	53	(17)	253.5
5	Tagoloan Community College	52.5	51.5	55.5	60.5	52.5	(21)	251.5
6	Mindanao University of Science and Technology	41.5	46.5	59.5	47	48.5	(18)	225

Legend:

Qualified for Finals

=== North Luzon ===
Held at University of the Cordilleras in Baguio City, on November 29, 2010

==== High school ====
Rank	Team name	Basic Elements	Tumbling	Stunts	Pyramids	Tosses	Deductions	Total
1	Baguio City National High School (Main); Baguio City NHS Pep Squad	52	52	53.5	60	57.5	(9)	266
2	BHC Educational Insstitution, Inc. BHC Centaurs	39	38.5	57.5	67	54.5	(19)	237.5
3	Batac Junior College	22	56	56.5	42	40.5	(26)	191

Legend:

Qualified for Finals

==== College ====
Rank	School	Basic Elements	Tumbling	Stunts	Pyramids	Tosses	Deductions	Total
1	University of the Cordilleras; UC Dance Squad	69.5	69	68.5	66.5	65	(6)	332.5
2	V.I.R.G.I.N.S. Cheerleading Squad; V.I.R.G.I.N.S. Cheerleading Squad	40.5	49.5	60	55	58	(7)	256
3	NorthWestern University; NWU Sagunday Pep Squad	47	57	51.5	45	59	(19)	240.5
4	College of Engineering and Architecture - Saint Louis University; CEA-SLU Towers Pep Squad	38.5	41.5	55	57	49.5	(48)	193.5
5	Pangasinan State University	19	36.5	42	42	29.5	(37)	132

Legend:

Qualified for Finals
