= Bulacan State University =

Public university in Bulacan, Philippines

- Pamantasang Pampamahalaan ng Bulacan (Filipino)
- Official logo of Bulacan State University
- Former names: Bulacan Trade School (1904–1953); Bulacan National Trade School (1953–1957); Bulacan School of Arts and Trades (1957–1965); Bulacan College of Arts and Trades (1965–1993)
- Type: State university
- Established: 1904; 122 years ago
- Accreditation: AACCUP, Inc. Level III (various programs)
- Academic affiliations: AACCUP, Inc.; CIRPS DC-SUC III; PSC; SCUFAR III
- Endowment: ₱200 million from DBM ₱5 million from PTCA
- Budget: ₱1.2 billion
- Chairman: Hon. Ronald Adamat
- President: Teody C. San Andres, EdD
- Faculty: 388 full-time 457 part-time
- Students: 45,000 (approx.)
- Undergraduates: 43,500 (approx.)
- Postgraduates: 1,500 (approx.)
- Location: Malolos, Bulacan, Philippines, Philippines; 14°51′29″N 120°48′50″E
- Campus: Urban, Suburban
- Student newspaper: Pacesetter
- Colors: Red; Gold
- Nickname: BulSU Gold Gears
- Sporting affiliations: SCUAA; CIRPS DC-SUC III; WNCAA; UCLAA; UCBL; BUCAA
- Website: bulsu.edu.ph
- Location in the Philippines

Bulacan State University (BulSU or BSU; Filipino: Pamantasang Pampamahalaan ng Bulacan) is a public university in Bulacan province, Philippines. Its main campus is in Malolos.

BulSU or BSU originated as a secondary school in 1904 ran by the Americans, and has now progressed into one of the biggest educational institutions in Region III.

The university is mandated to provide technical training and to promote research, advanced studies, and progressive leadership. It has been identified by the Commission on Higher Education (CHED) as one of the Center for Excellence and Development institutions in the country and one of the Training Centers nationwide for teachers pursuing education in areas beyond their specialization.

== History ==
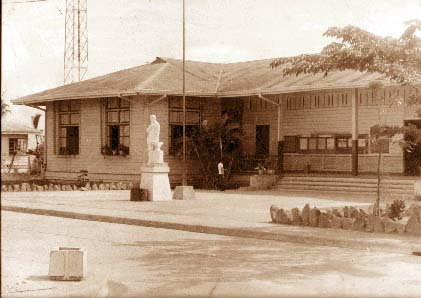
Earliest known photo of Bulacan State University

=== American invasion era ===
The Bulacan State University started as an intermediate school in 1904. It was established during the early years of the American occupation by virtue of Act 74 of the Philippine Commission in 1901, which created the then Department of Public Instruction with the mandate to establish schools in every pueblo (town) of the country and reorganize those already existing. Instructions in the intermediate schools established during that time were supplemented with trade or industrial instruction.

Upon the implementation in 1918 of the Philippine Autonomy Act passed by the U.S. Congress in 1916, the Bulacan Trade School was formally turned-over to the Filipinos with Mr. Basilio Abiado as its first Filipino principal.

=== Post-war ===
In 1945, after repairing the damage suffered during the Second World War; the school reopened with a few hand tools and materials donated by the U.S. army stationed in the provincial capitol. With the steady increase in enrollment, more buildings were constructed. In 1949, the United States Information Service (USIS) donated two Quonset huts, which were used as shops and classrooms.

On June 20, 1953, the school was nationalized under R.A. NO. 908 and became the Bulacan National Trade School.

By virtue of Republic Act 1800, the Bulacan National Trade School was converted into the Bulacan School of Arts and Trades (BSAT) on July 1, 1957. The school offered the two-year post-secondary courses with specializations in automotive, machine shop and girls' trade courses.

By virtue of Republic Act 4470, the Bulacan School of Arts and Trades (BSAT) was converted into the Bulacan College of Arts and Trades (BCAT) on June 19, 1965. The college began to expand its technical and technician course offerings by adding shop specialization.

In 1967, it offered the four-year Bachelor of Science in Industrial Education (BSIE) with majors in drafting, machine shop practice, woodworking and automotive, cosmetology, electronics and electricity.

From 1968 to 1973, the five-year engineering programs were added to the courses offered by the college.

In 1977, the college started offering graduate program, the Master of Arts in Teaching with majors in technical and vocational subjects.

In 1983, the college continued to expand its curricular offerings and develop its facilities to meet the needs of the growing student population. The teacher education curriculum added more major fields of specialization in secondary education. New majors in the engineering program were also added. Doctoral program was offered and new majors in the master's program were introduced.

=== Conversion into state university ===
On December 30, 1993, President Fidel V. Ramos signed House Bill 461 into law, known as Republic Act 7665, which converted the Bulacan College of Arts and Trades into the Bulacan State University.

The conversion into a State University provided more impetus to the administration to implement a wide range of institutional development programs, which included upgrading of academic qualifications of faculty members, streamlining the curricular programs by creating colleges and institutes, securing state-of-the-art instructional facilities, physical plant development and expansion, and broadening access to education by establishing additional satellite campuses.

=== Recent history ===
In 2002, a landmark agreement between the university and the Integrated Bar of the Philippines, Bulacan Chapter, was made to establish the BSI-J – Marcelo H. Del Pilar College of Law. The Marcelo H. Del Pilar Law Foundation, Inc. was created to support the program of the college. The move was hailed by The Technical Panel for Legal Education of the Commission on Higher Education as innovative being the first of its kind in the Philippines. The first batch of graduates of the college who took the 2006 Bar Examinations garnered an impressive passing average of 42.8 percent, higher than the national passing average of 30.6 percent.

In 2004, the university started to gain educational agreements with some nations in the Asia Pacific region namely in China, South Korea, and Hong Kong.

In 2007, the Accrediting Agency of Chartered Colleges and Universities (AACCUP), a member of Asia-Pacific Quality Network (APQN) and International Network of Quality Assurance Agencies in Higher Education (INQAAHE), granted Level III accreditation status to the elementary, secondary and industrial education programs of the College of Education. BulSU was the first State University in Central Luzon to be awarded a Level III Accreditation in its Education programs by the AACCUP.

In 2008, the university produced outstanding performance in licensure and bar examinations: 90% passing average in the June Nurse Licensure Examinations, 87% passing average in the November Nurse Licensure Examination and 32% passing average in the Bar Examinations. BulSU also ranked 3rd in the top schools for the Electronics and Communication Engineer Licensure Examination.

The university has been consistently performing well in the National Board Examinations with results exceeding the National Passing Rate and has produced individuals who were among the top performers in the board examinations.

The university recently received its ISO 9001:2015 Certification, passed the Level II Institutional Accreditation while 50 academic programs of the different Colleges are already accredited by the Accrediting Agency of Chartered Colleges and Universities (AACCUP). To date, most of the Programs of the university have at least Level Il accredited status and gearing for Level III.

In 2018, Bulacan State University underwent a massive reconstruction and upgrade of its facilities.

Bulacan State University wordmark currently used

President Bongbong Marcos signed on February 15, 2024, the 16-page Republic Act 11980, the "Revised Bulacan State University Charter".

On April 12, 2024, BulSU won the third iTHINK Hackathon organized by the ISLA Camp (ICP HUB Philippines), held during the International Conference on Innovation, Technology, and Entrepreneurship (IRCITE) 2024. The BSU quartet, a team of Web3 developer participants, known as "Team Open Soars" is composed of Ryka Gene M. Austria, Mary Queen O. Casaclang, Richard James C. Bagay, and Janniel Andrei D. De Jesus, led by coach Gabriel M. Galang.

== Tragedy ==
In August 2014 during a fieldtrip to the Madlum Cave, seven students of Bulacan State University were swept after heavy rains which triggered a flash flood while crossing the Madlum river located in San Miguel, Bulacan.

== Campus ==
=== Main campus ===
The Main Campus of BulSU is situated along MacArthur Highway in Brgy. Guinhawa, Malolos, Bulacan, Philippines.

==== Bahay-Saliksikan ng Bulacan ====
The university's Bahay-Saliksikan ng Bulacan (Center for Bulacan Studies) was established on November 24, 1997, by the Samahang Pangkasaysayan ng Bulacan, Inc. (Historical Association of Bulacan, Inc.) with the assistance of Bulakeño (Bulakenyo) scholars including Jose Tantoco and Jaime Veneracion of the University of the Philippines Diliman, to collect, promote, study, and research Bulacan's rich and diverse history, culture, environment, archaeology and others that concern the province, that would help enforce and create public policies and programs for either Bulacan or other provinces within Luzon area. It is funded by the Provincial Government of Bulacan in 2004 and listed by the Komisyon sa Wikang Filipino (Commission on the Filipino Language) as a Pambansang Alagad ng Wika (National Authority on the Filipino Language). In 2018 through the lead of the Commission on Higher Education the BulSU Bahay Saliksikan ng Bulacan started the operation of the Bulacan Cultural Material Laboratory designed to analyzed, accession and conserve different kinds of materials culture that can be found in Bulacan and nearby provinces.

5-Storey Engineering Building construction

==== Smart-BulSU Wireless Laboratory ====
To promote and upgrade the quality of engineering education, the university partnered with Smart Communications, Inc. on the Smart Wireless Engineering Education Program (SWEEP), the first industry-academe partnership in the country that seeks to improve the level of technology and engineering education, particularly in the field of Electronics and Communications Engineering (ECE). SWEEP was launched on March 28, 2003, with the inauguration of the "first wireless laboratory".

==== MEE-ART Center ====
The faculty of the College of Engineering now trains technicians and engineers sent by local industries, visiting faculty, and senior students from different universities in the country. With industrial-type equipment and overseas-trained instructors, the university, through its Mechatronics Engineering – Automation Research and Training (MEE-ART) Center, offers a short-term training courses in basic and advanced pneumatics, industrial automation, mechatronics, electro-pneumatics, and programmable logic control.

==== Institute of Local Government Administration ====
The Institute of Local Government Administration is the primary extension agency of BulSU. Instituted in 1995 in partnership with the Local Government Academy of the Department of Interior and Local Government and the provincial government of Bulacan, the Institute actively promotes the knowledge, skills attitudes and values that make for effective, efficient, responsive and service-oriented local governance in the cities and the countryside.

The institute provides Continuing Education, Technology Transfer and Consultancy, Technology Job Information/Placement, Communications Media, Local Government Capability Building Program, Integrated Capability Building Program, Technology of Participation, Building Customer Service Skills, Action Planning Workshop, Public Service Excellence Program, Planning and Budgeting Workshop, Barangay Executive Training, Continuing Cooperative Training, Opinion Poll Survey, Moral Leadership and Peak Performance, Barangay Justice Service System, and Codification of Ordinance.

Student lounge construction in 2024

==== DOST-BulSU Food Testing Laboratory ====
The laboratory has been performing different food testing services like microbiological tests, physico-chemical tests, and shelf-life testing.

==== CHED-DepED Teacher Training Center ====
The Commission on Higher Education (CHED) has chosen the BulSU College of Education to be one of the training centers nationwide for teachers who want to be educated in areas beyond their specialization. As one of the 85 training centers all over the country chosen by CHED. Teachers in Central Luzon under the Department of Education underwent training for a certificate program.

==== BulSU Language Center ====
Bulacan State University Language Center, located at the Malolos Campus, is an English language center, that works hand-in-hand with top universities in South Korea, Taiwan, Hong Kong and mainland China.

=== Satellite campuses ===
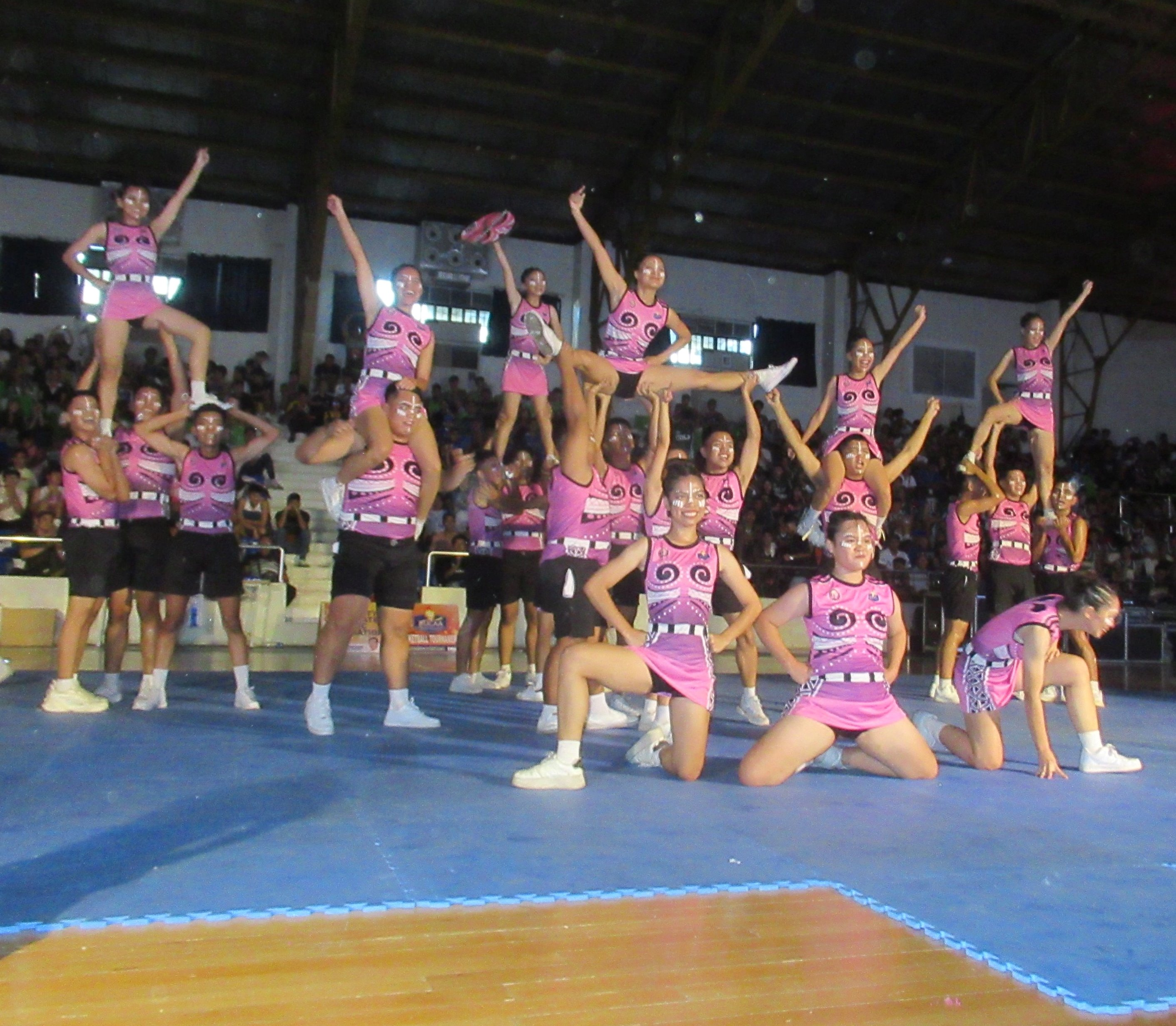
Cheerleaders BSU-Meneses competitors

- Bustos Campus along L. Mercado St. Corner C.L. Hilario St. in Brgy. Poblacion, Bustos, Bulacan, the largest satellite campus, was established in 1975. Bulacan State University – Bustos Campus (BulSU Bustos) started by being housed in the Bustos Elementary School to a five - room at the Old Bustos public market. Campus expansion included the Pedro Pancho Technological Building (February 2007), the Multi-Media Room and Library (2014), Gymnasium, the Bustos Campus Clinic, Campus Infirmary and Breastfeeding (Lactation Room, August 2019) and the Administration Building (December 2023).
- Sarmiento Campus in San Jose del Monte, Bulacan was established in 1998.
- Meneses Campus in Triple Junction Subdivision, Brgy. Matungao, Bulakan, Bulacan was established in 2000. The Dr. Anacleto R. Meneses Campus started as an extension engineering class under the CAS in Bambang within the Doña Candelaria Meneses Duque High School. In April 2005, the Campus transferred to the present site. Former Mayor Anacleto R. Meneses (term 1972 – 1986 & 1995 – 2004) donated the building to BSU on August 12, 2024.
- Consortium in Montessori De San Ildefonso in Brgy. San Juan, San Ildefonso, Bulacan was established in 2008.
- Hagonoy Campus in Brgy. Iba and Carillo, Hagonoy, Bulacan was established in 2011.
- Pulilan Campus in Brgy. Paltao, Pulilan, Bulacan was established in 2013.
- San Rafael Campus in Brgy. San Roque, San Rafael, Bulacan along Plaridel Bypass Road was established in 2022. The P200-M Campus was inaugurated on December 14, 2022. The twin 4-storey buildings were constructed in a 2-hectare land donated by Filinvest Corporation. The school features fences, main gate, with security office, second gate, the Filinvest matriarch 'Mercedes T. Gotianun' Building, the Ricardo "Tata Carding" Silverio building, construction of the P 48 million auditorium and historical markers. It was inaugurated on December 14, 2022, by BSU President Cecilia S. Navasero-Gascon. It was created by Republic Act 11329, the "Bulacan State University-San Rafael Campus Act" (April 22, 2019). The school offers free medicine program under the "Doctor Para sa Bayan Act" or Republic Act No. 11509. The P200-M BulSU College of Medicine (BulSU-COM) is under the College of Science, San Rafael Campus, with Prof. Gerald Hilario, as executive director of BulSU San Rafael Campus and its dean, Dr. Dwight Villacorte. In August 2023, President Cecilia S. Navasero-Gascon announced the admission of 50 medicine students for the 2023–2024 school year.

== International participation ==
The new millennium saw Bulacan State University going global and participating in cross-border education with other Asian countries such as South Korea, People's Republic of China, Taiwan, Hong Kong, Singapore, and Malaysia. The university signed agreements with educational institutions in these countries for the offering of various programs of BulSU especially the doctoral and master's programs. The university, in partnerships with Korean institutions, also hosts Korean students for their English language course. These programs paved the way for the on-going students and faculty exchanges and visitations with those institutions abroad.

=== Hong Kong campus ===
In 2003, BSU Hong Kong Campus in Nathan Road, Yaumatei, Hong Kong was institutionalized by virtue of a Memorandum of Agreement signed between Bulacan State University and Hong Kong Lifelong Education Organization (HKLEO).

The Hong Kong Campus was accredited and recognized by Commission on Higher Education (CHED), Accrediting Agency for Chartered Colleges and Universities in the Philippines (AACCUP), Inc., International Association of Universities (IAU) and the Ministry of Education of China.

=== Confucius Institute ===
The Office of Chinese Language Council International signed an agreement with Bulacan State University on June 22, 2007, to jointly established a Confucius Institute. The institute was formally launched on February 28, 2009, with the Northwest University in Xi'an, China that serves as the Chinese partner of the Confucius Institute.

During the signing ceremony, it was announced that the Confucius Institute will offer various Chinese courses, conduct Chinese cultural activities and hold HSK examinations in the hope of meeting the demands of Filipinos for Chinese and strengthening communication and friendship between the two peoples.

The Confucius Institute at Bulacan State University is the second CI established in the country and the first CI in a state university.

== Colleges ==
College/school founding
| College/school | Year founded |
| Graduate School | Year |
| College of Law | Year |
| College of Architecture and Fine Arts | Year |
| College of Arts and Letters | Year |
| College of Business Education and Accountancy | Year |
| College of Criminal Justice Education | Year |
| College of Education | Year |
| College of Engineering | Year |
| College of Hospitality and Tourism Management | Year |
| College of Industrial Technology | Year |
| College of Information and Communications Technology | Year |
| College of Nursing | Year |
| College of Science | Year |
| College of Social Sciences and Philosophy | Year |
| College of Sports, Exercise and Recreation | Year |
| Bustos Campus | Year |
| Hagonoy | Year |
| Meneses Campus | Year |
| Sarmineto Campus | Year |
| San Rafael Campus | Year |
| Laboratory High School | Year |
^{*}Notes can be added here

== Gallery ==
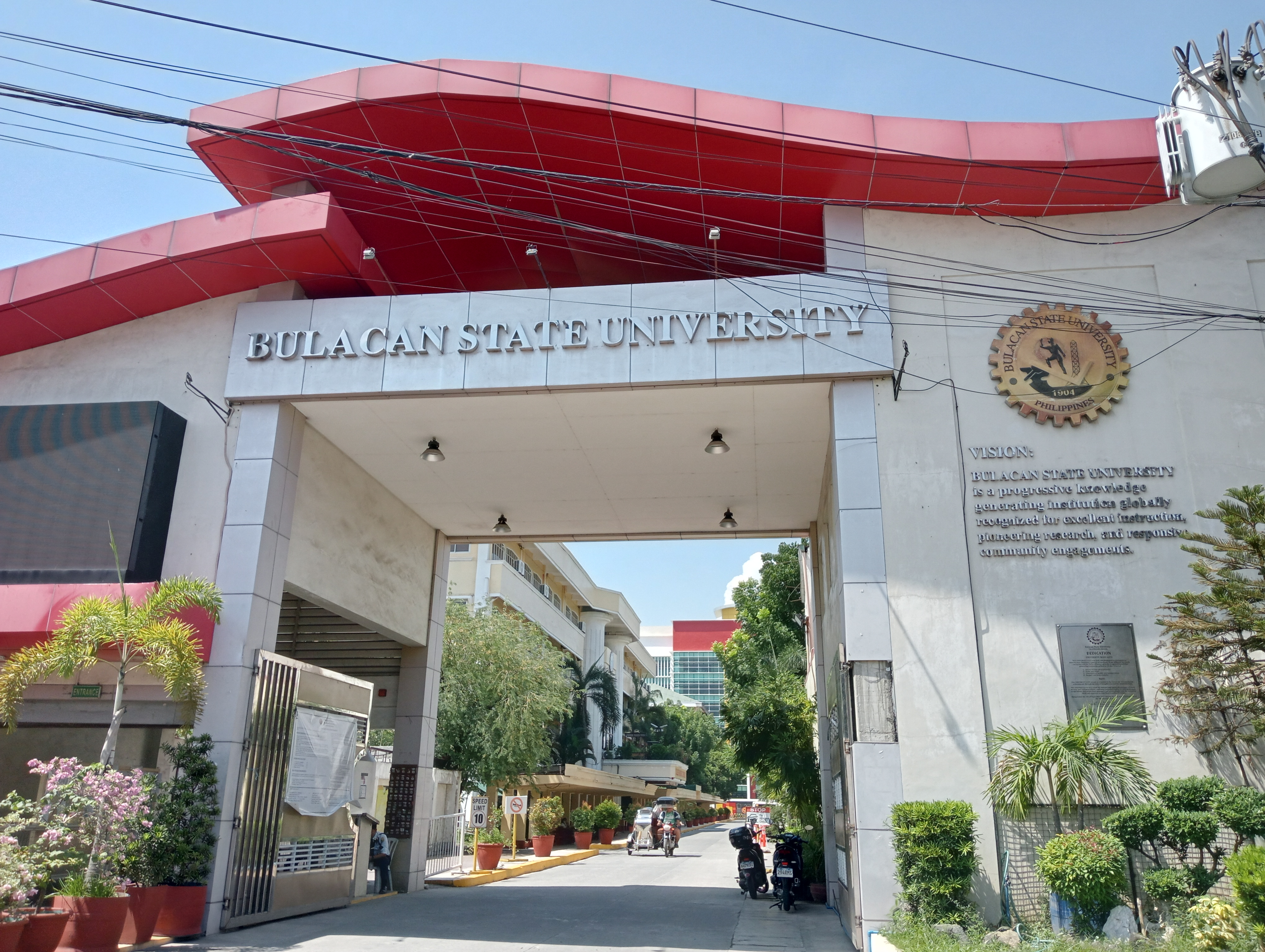
Main Gate

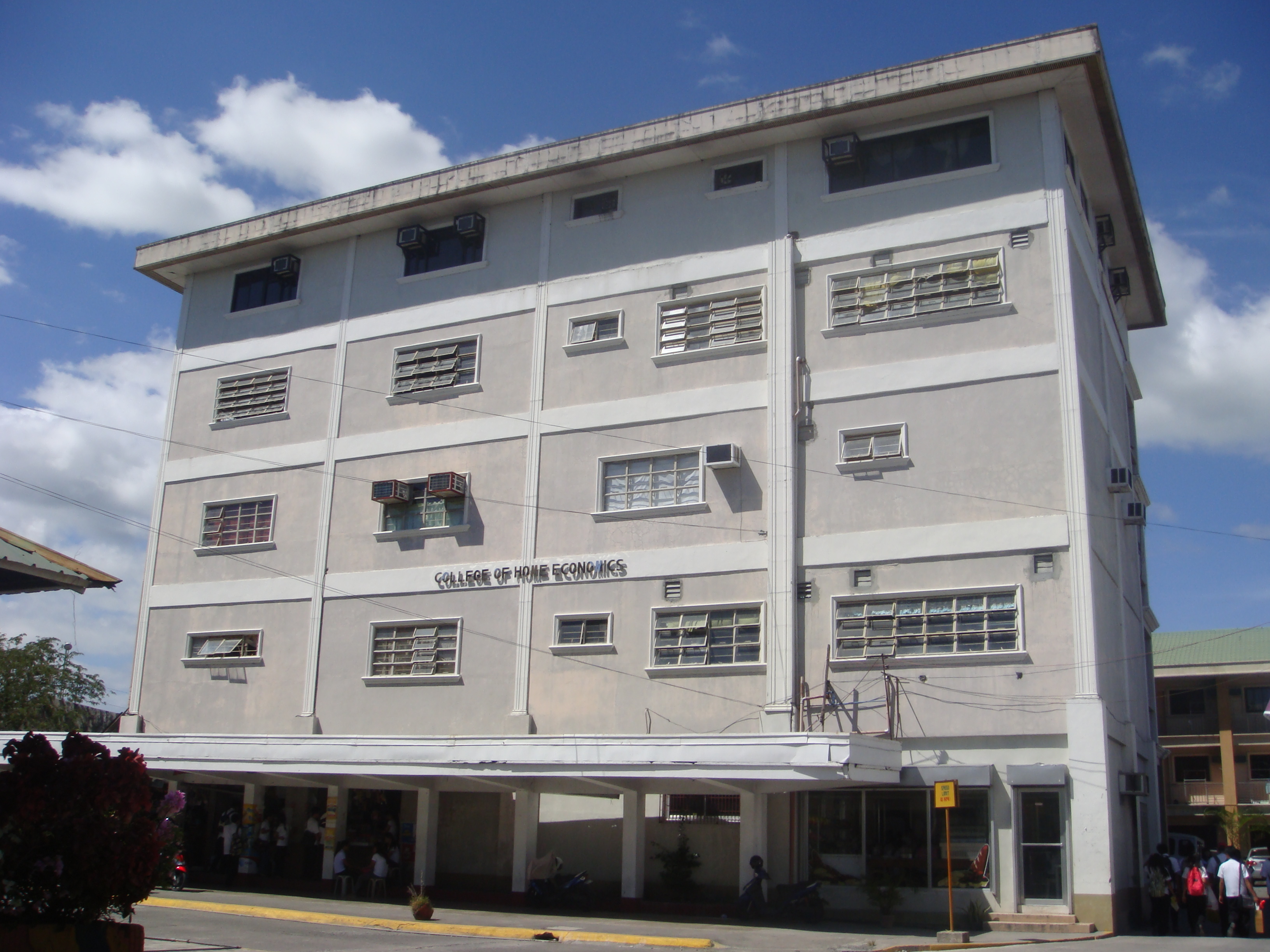
College of Hospitality and Tourism Management building

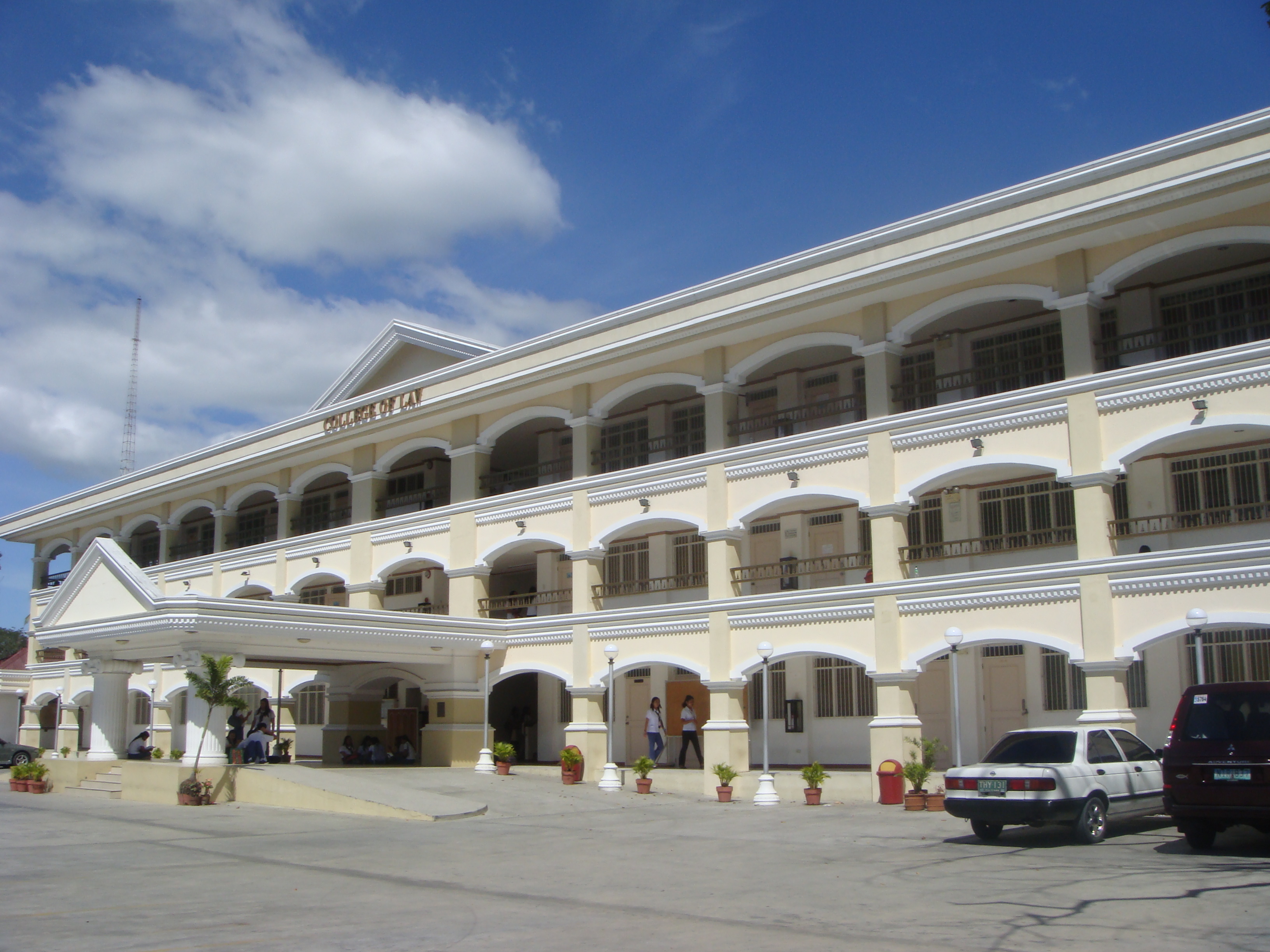
College of Law building

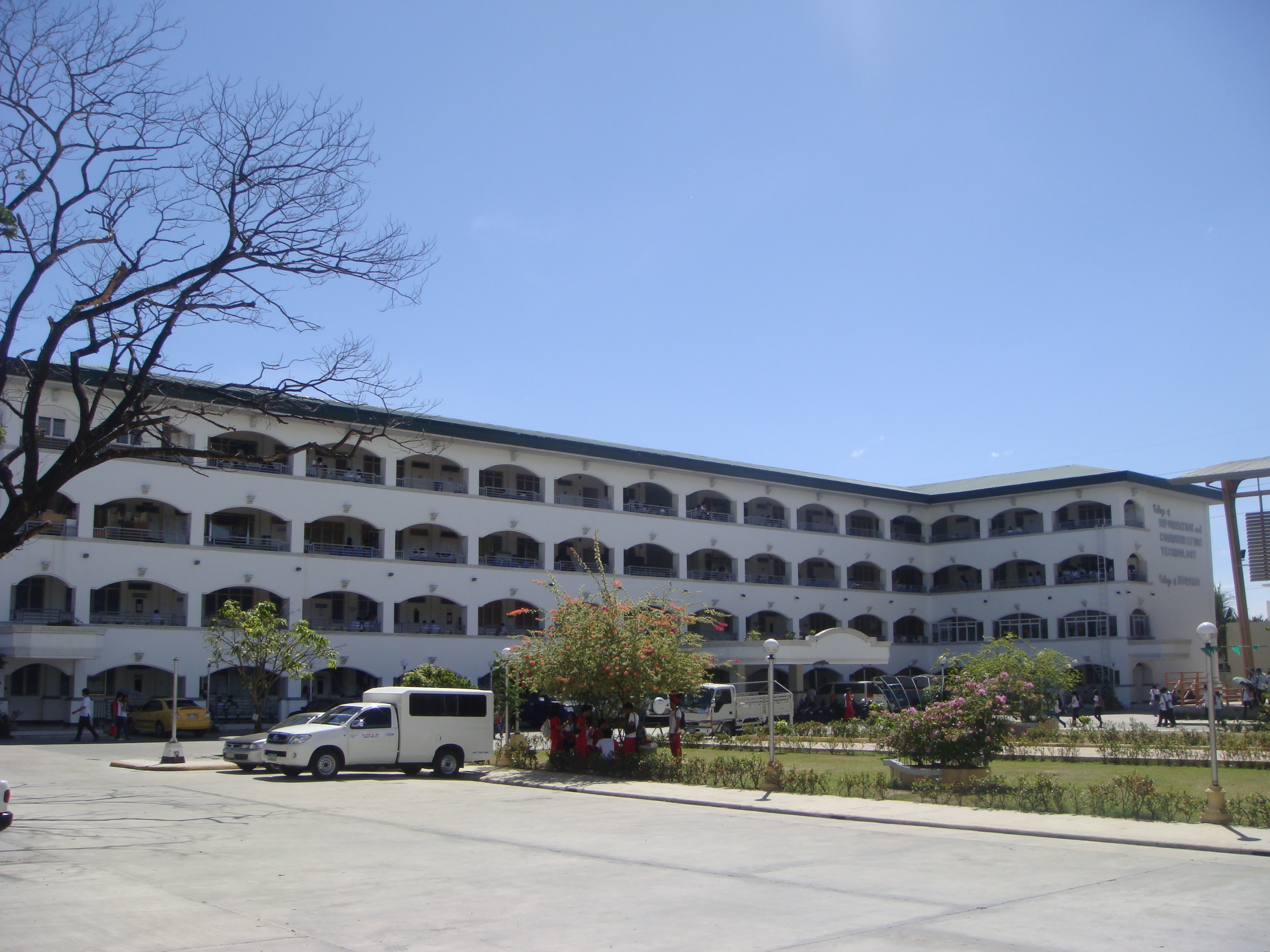
Pimentel Hall - College of Information and Communications Technology and College of Nursing building

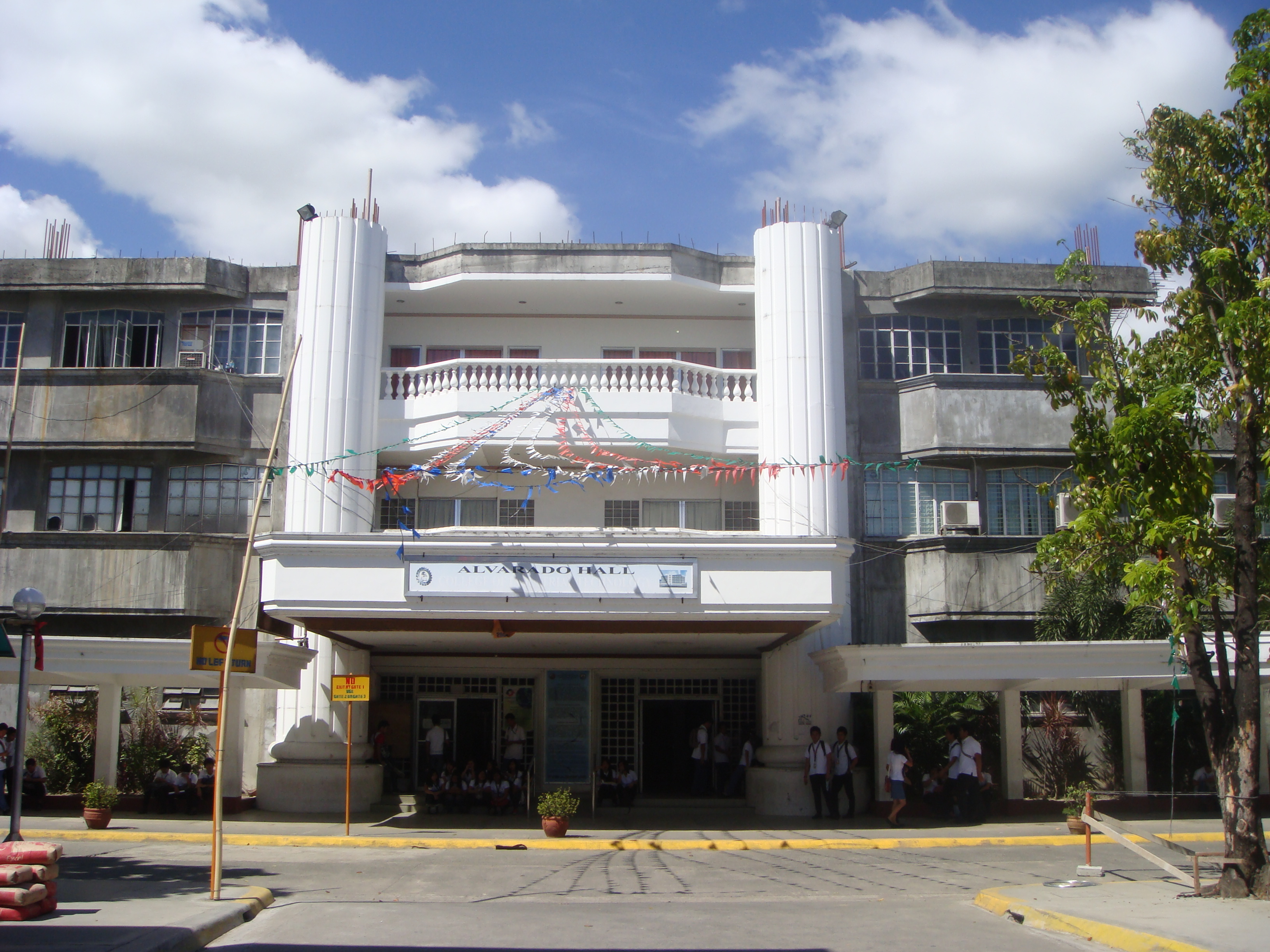
Alvarado Hall - College of Industrial Technology building

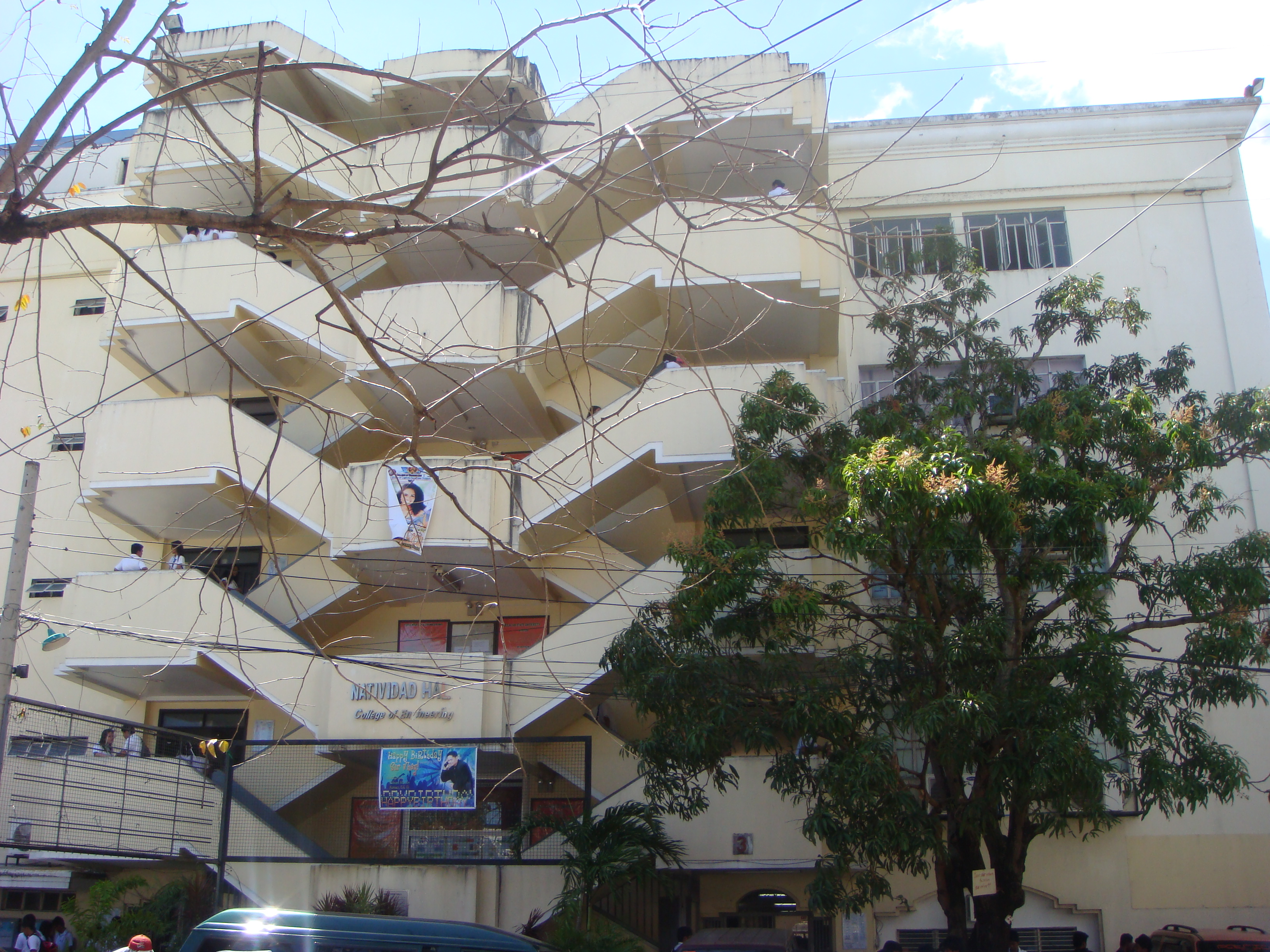
Natividad Hall – College of Engineering building

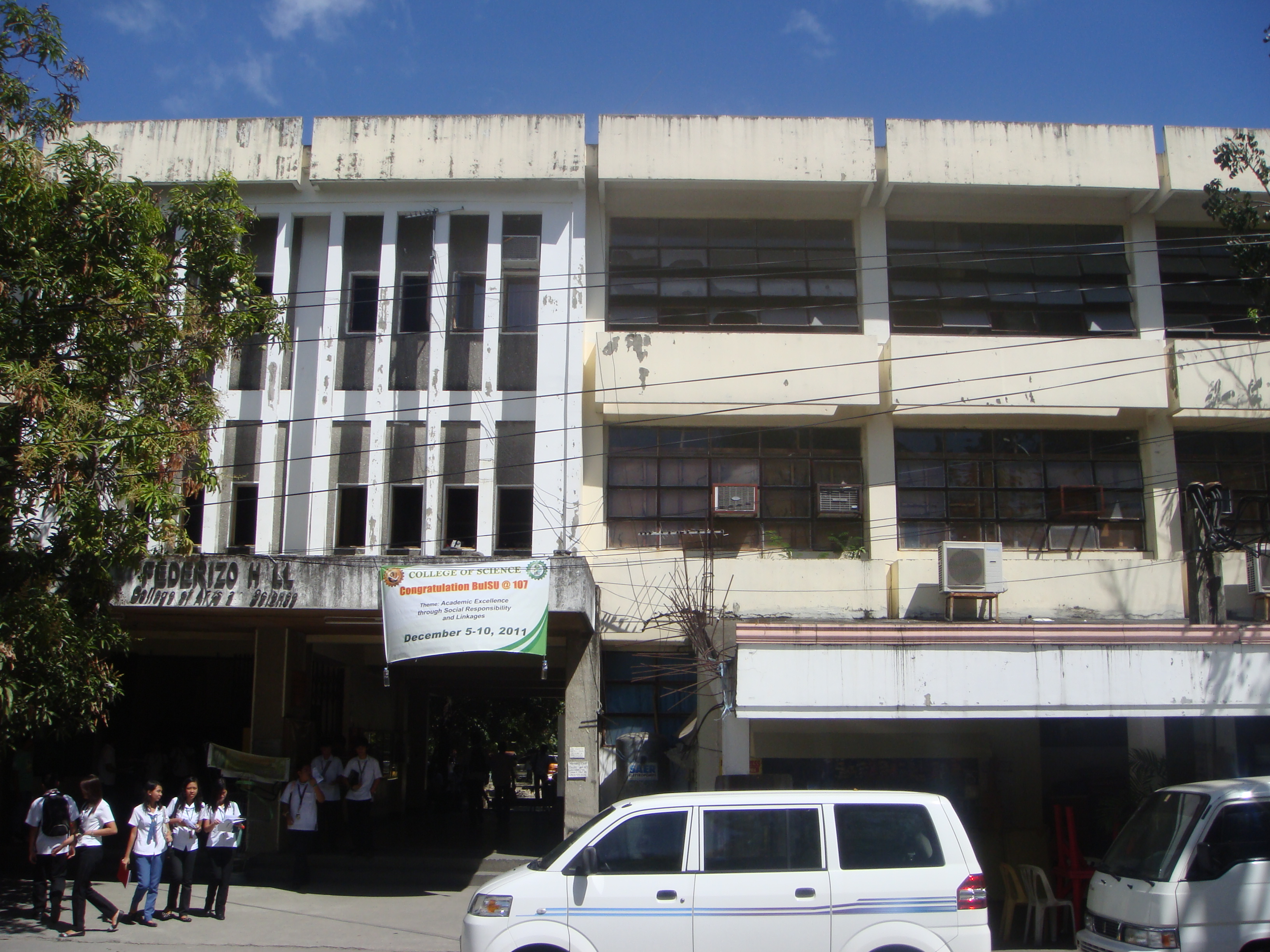
Federizo Hall – College of Science, College of Arts and Letters and College of Architecture and Fine Arts building, oldest in the university

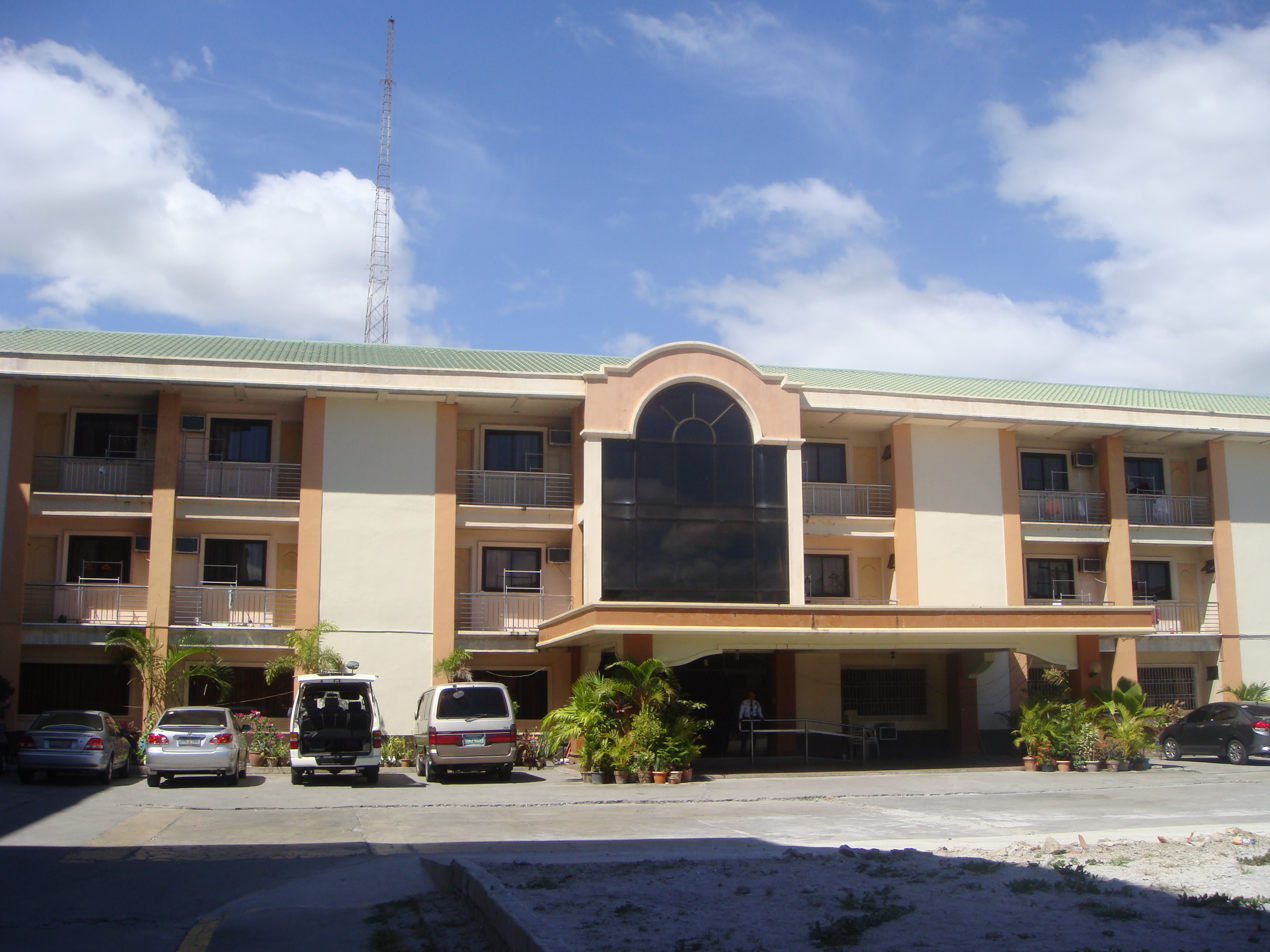
University Hostel

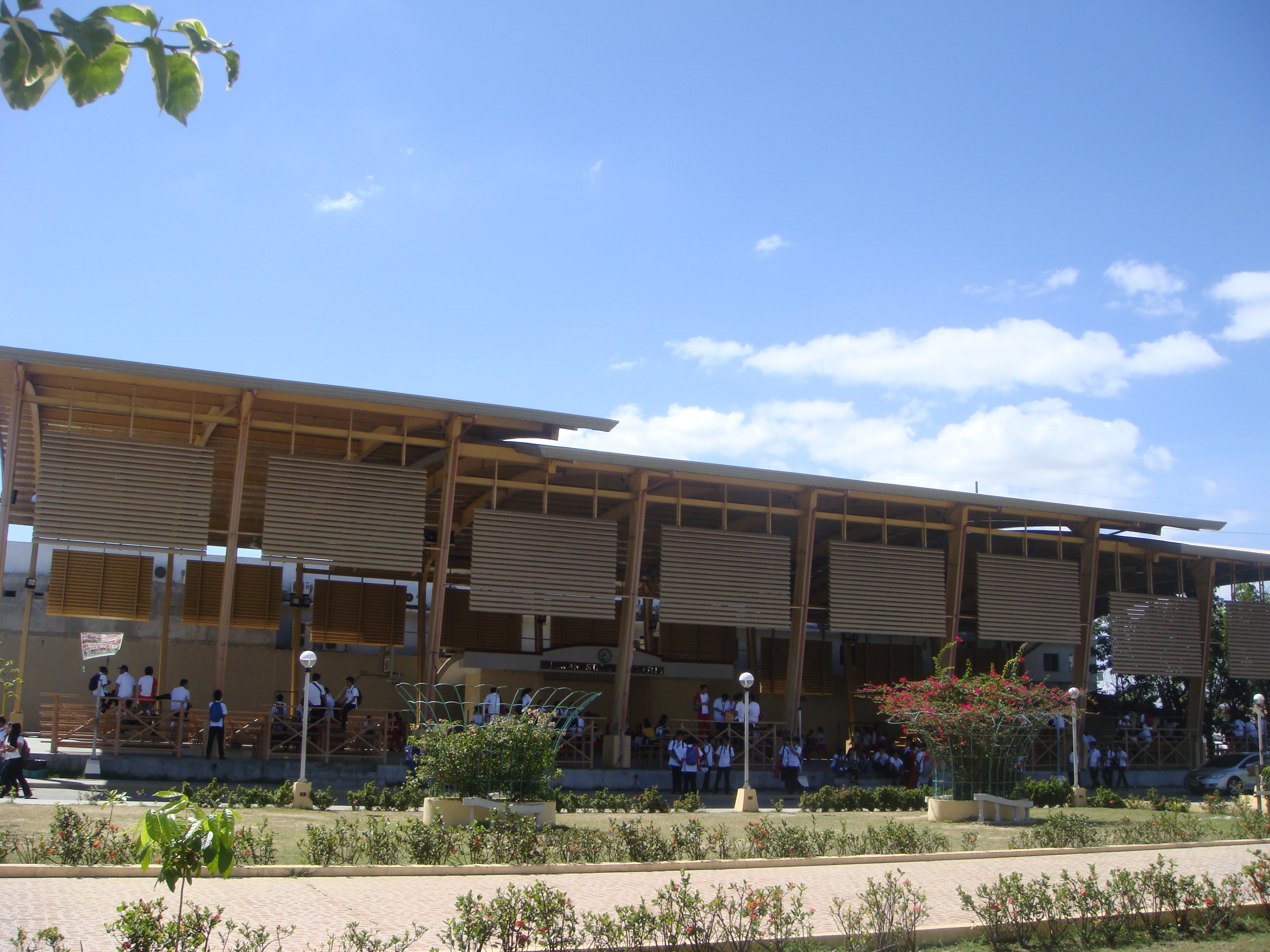
BulSU Activity Center

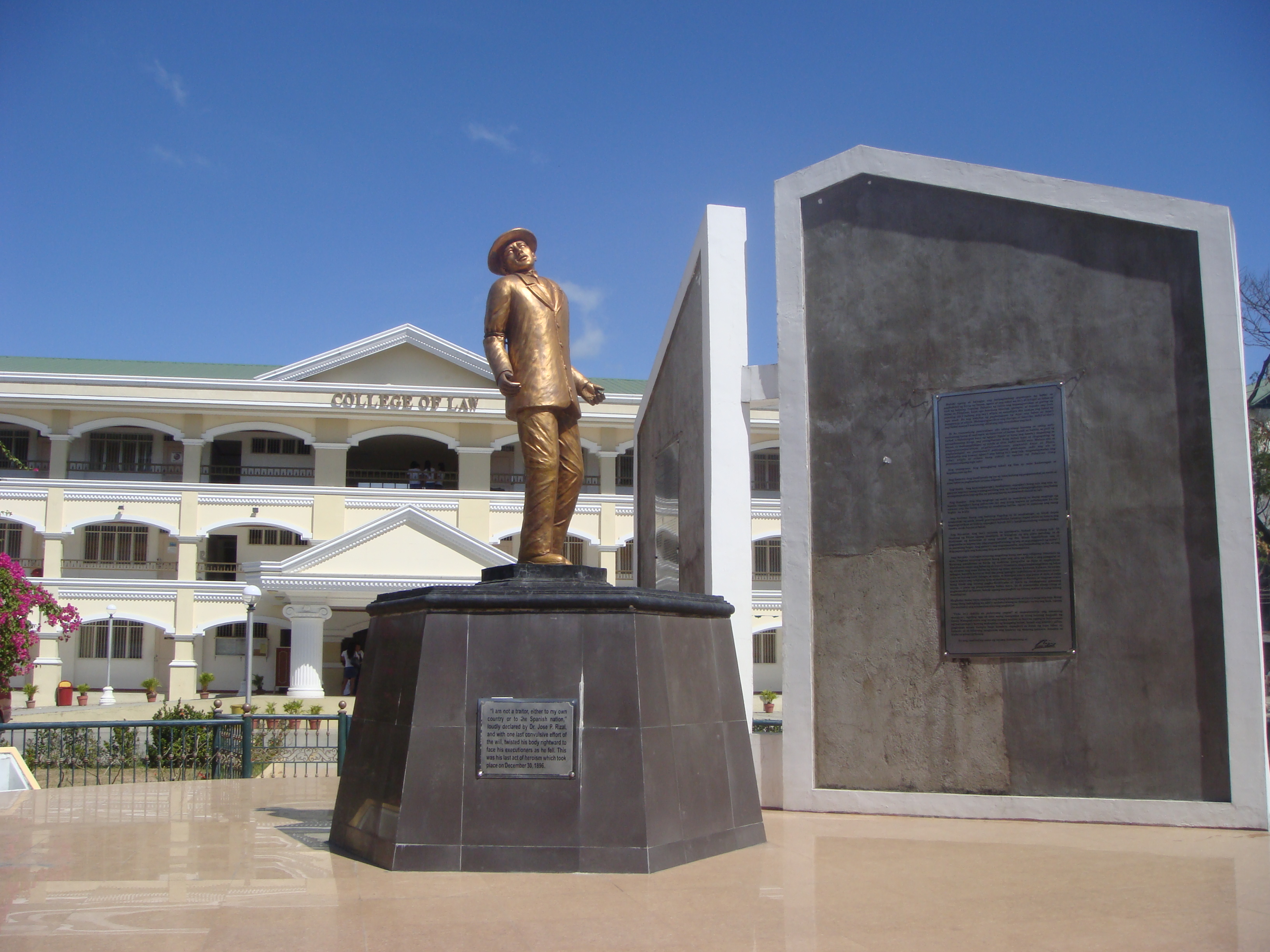
The Mini Jose Rizal Park in front of College of Law building
