= Tarlac State University =

Public university in Tarlac, Philippines

- Pamantasang Pampamahalaan ng Tarlac (Filipino)
- Former name: Tarlac College of Technology (TCT)
- Type: Public
- Established: 1906
- Accreditation: AACCUP
- Academic affiliations: PASUC, PSC
- Budget: ₱476 million (2019)
- Chairperson: Ronald L. Adamat
- President: Arnold E. Velasco
- Faculty: 440 teaching staff
- Administrative staff: 435 administrative and support personnel
- Students: 25,000 (2024)
- Location: Romulo Boulevard, Tarlac City, Philippines; 15°29′6″N 120°35′15″E
- Campus: Urban Main: San Vicente, Tarlac City 1.2 hectares (12,000 m^{2}) Satellite: Lucinda Campus Brgy. Binauganan, Tarlac City 10 ha (100,000 m^{2}); San Isidro Campus Brgy. San Isidro, Tarlac City 8 ha (80,000 m^{2}) Tarlac LGU Satelite: Concepcion Campus Brgy. San Nicolas Poblacion, Concepcion, Tarlac 9,000 m^{2} (97,000 sq ft); Capas Campus Brgy. Cristo Rey, Capas, Tarlac; La Paz Campus La Paz, Tarlac 1,800 m^{2} (19,000 sq ft)
- Hymn: TSU Hymn
- Colors: Maroon and Golden yellow
- Nickname: TSU Firefox
- Sporting affiliations: UCLAA; SCUAA
- Website: tsu.edu.ph

- Location in Luzon Location in the Philippines

Tarlac State University (TSU; Filipino: Pamantasang Pampamahalaan ng Tarlac) is a public university located in Tarlac City, Philippines. Established in 1906, it is the flagship academic institution of higher education in the province offering different degree programs through its ten colleges and three campuses.

TSU started as an elementary trade school progressing to a secondary school. Later, it became a collegiate technical school and then a full-fledged state college, the Tarlac College of Technology. On October 13, 1989, it was converted into a state university by virtue of Republic Act No. 6764.

Tarlac State University sits on a Level III-A status awarded by the Joint Committee of the Commission on Higher Education (CHED) and the Department of Budget and Management (DBM) in recognition of its excellent instruction, active involvement in research programs and community-wide extension services. Most of its curricular programs are accredited by the Accrediting Agency of Chartered Colleges and Universities in the Philippines (AACCUP).

The university acquired its ISO 9001:2008 certification in 2013 for its provision of technical assistance, consultancy and training for the implementation of community development, industry development, and extension support services program. In August 2016, TSU was granted an Integrated Management System (IMS) Certification, becoming the first state university in the Philippines to acquire this status. The IMS Certification covers ISO 9001:2015 Quality Management System, ISO 14001:2015 Environment Management System, and OHSAS 18001:2007 Occupational Health and Safety Management System under the United States Accreditation System (USAS).

It is mandated to provide advanced instruction in literature, philosophy, the sciences, and the arts, and also to offer professional and technical training courses. To enhance the academic sector, the syllabi of the various course subjects adopted the outcomes-based education (OBE) format prescribed by CHED.

TSU is the first university among other State Universities and Colleges (SUCs) with a government authority to conduct Transnational Education Programs. It has established international linkages with a number of colleges and universities in Asia.

== History ==
=== Early years ===
Tarlac State University was established in the same time that public education was developed in the Philippines. Its origin could be traced as early as 1906 as one of the trade schools offering industrial and vocational courses in selected regions. This was in pursuit of the American colonial government's policy of laying the groundwork for a western-oriented educational system in the country.

By 1909, under the auspices of the provincial government and the Provincial High School, the school began to accept secondary students.

In 1909, TSU, then the Tarlac Trade School, began to open its doors to high school students. By 1921, it had evolved into a full-fledged secondary school. From 1931 up to the start of World War II, it was annexed to Tarlac High School.

After the war in 1946, it was separated from Tarlac High School, and in 1959, the Congress of the Philippines approved House Bill 1006 converting the Tarlac Trade School into the Tarlac School of Arts and Trades (TSAT) which began to offer collegiate technical education courses with Manuel Espinosa as its first superintendent.

In 1965, TSAT obtained its status as a state college by virtue of Republic Act 4337. It was converted into the Tarlac College of Technology (TCT) and merged with the Tarlac National Agricultural School in Camiling, Tarlac. From 1965 to 1972, Mario Manese served as its first president, introducing teacher education and engineering as new courses.

Jack Smith became the president in 1972. TCT's Institute of Agriculture was made into a separate state college in 1974 to be known as the Tarlac College of Agriculture, now Tarlac Agricultural University. The college underwent expansions under his administration, including the acquisition of a ten-hectare land in Barangay Binauganan known today as the Villa Lucinda Campus which became the site of the Laboratory School, College of Education, and a ground for different agricultural and industrial projects.

=== University era ===
Ernesto Cosme was designated as the officer in charge in September 1984, eventually becoming the TCT's last president. It was during his administration that Republic Act No. 6764 was signed into law by former President Corazon Aquino on October 13, 1989, converting TCT into Tarlac State University (TSU). This was made possible through the sponsorship of Congressmen Jose Cojuangco Jr., Jose Yap, and Hermie Aquino.

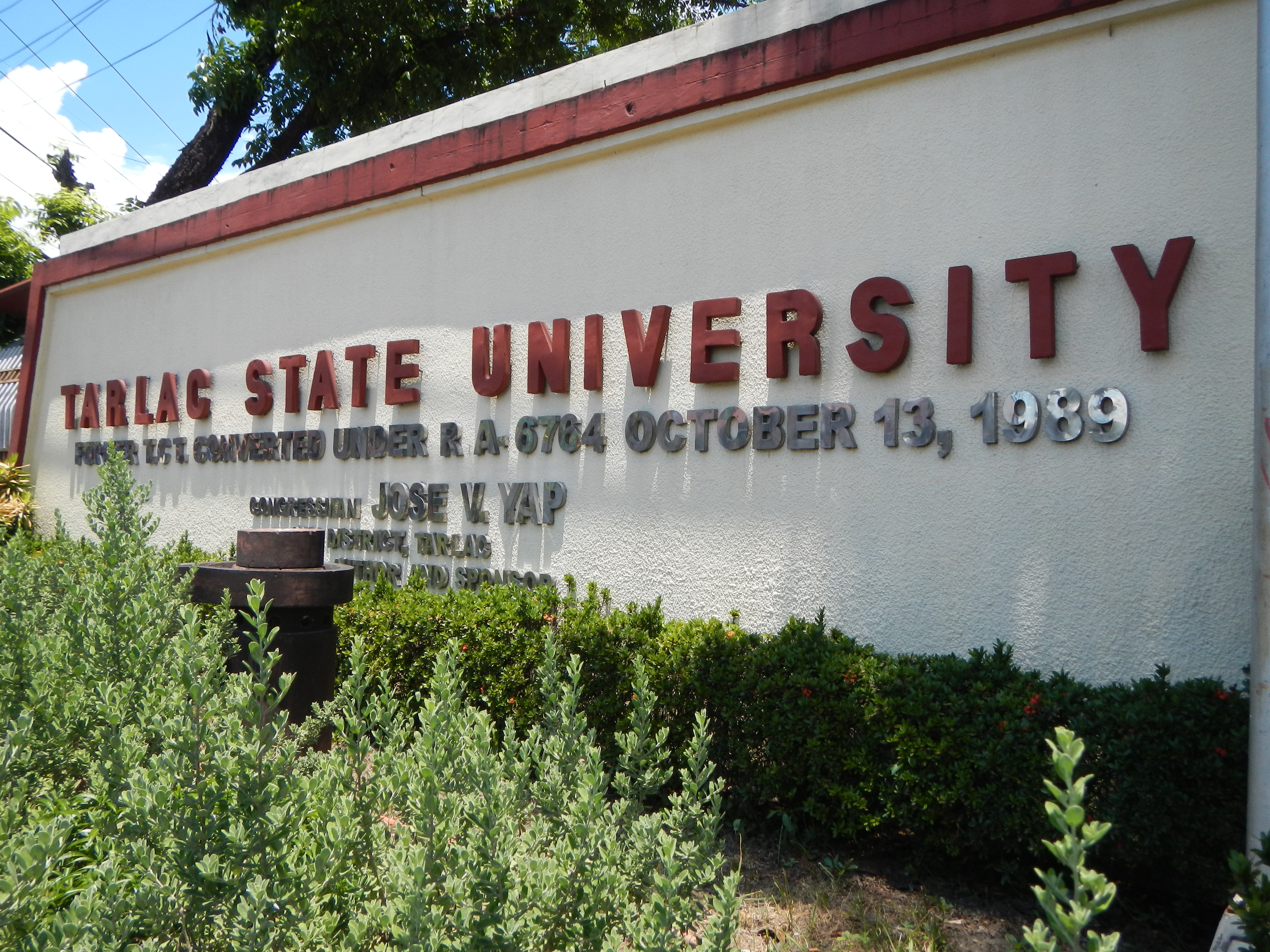
Tarlac College of Technology was converted to Tarlac State University by virtue of R.A. 6764 in 1989.

On August 8, 1990, the university's Board of Regents (BOR) appointed Alejandro Fernandez, formerly a professor at the University of the Philippines, as the first president of TSU. During this time, TSU was able to acquire its eight-hectare lot for a third campus in San Isidro under a 50-year lease contract with the provincial government. Upon the end of the term of Fernandez, Graduate School Dean Priscilla Viuya was appointed as OIC from February 28 up to mid-September 1994.

Rodolfo Baking, a former professor at Technological University of the Philippines, was appointed as the second president in September 1994. His administration focused on upgrading the academic standard of the institution and additional curricular offerings. In December 1996, the board designated Dolores Matias, Vice-President for Academic Affairs, as the officer in charge where she steered the university into attaining its visions and missions of offering relevant quality education to the people of Tarlac and its neighboring provinces. Matias was appointed as the third university President by the BOR on March 25, 1998. In 2001, a streamlined organization structure made and implemented as soon as Matias assumed into office resulted in a functional and revitalized university organization.

Priscilla Viuya, Vice-President for Academic Affairs during Matias' term, became the fourth University President starting from March 26, 2006. As president, she has taken steps to introduce new programs and build a stronger international profile. These measures were linked closely to the university's vision of maintaining a culture of excellence in instruction and research by promoting quality higher education programs for people empowerment and professional development.

Myrna Q. Mallari was appointed by the Board of Regents as the fifth president of Tarlac State University on March 31, 2014.

== Campuses ==
Tarlac State University has one main campus and two satellite campuses within the vicinity of Tarlac City and an international joint institute in Hong Kong. The nine colleges were divided into three campuses to control the student population of the university. Its main campus, with the smallest land area, houses five colleges, San Isidro Campus houses three colleges, and Lucinda Campus houses two colleges.

=== Main campus ===
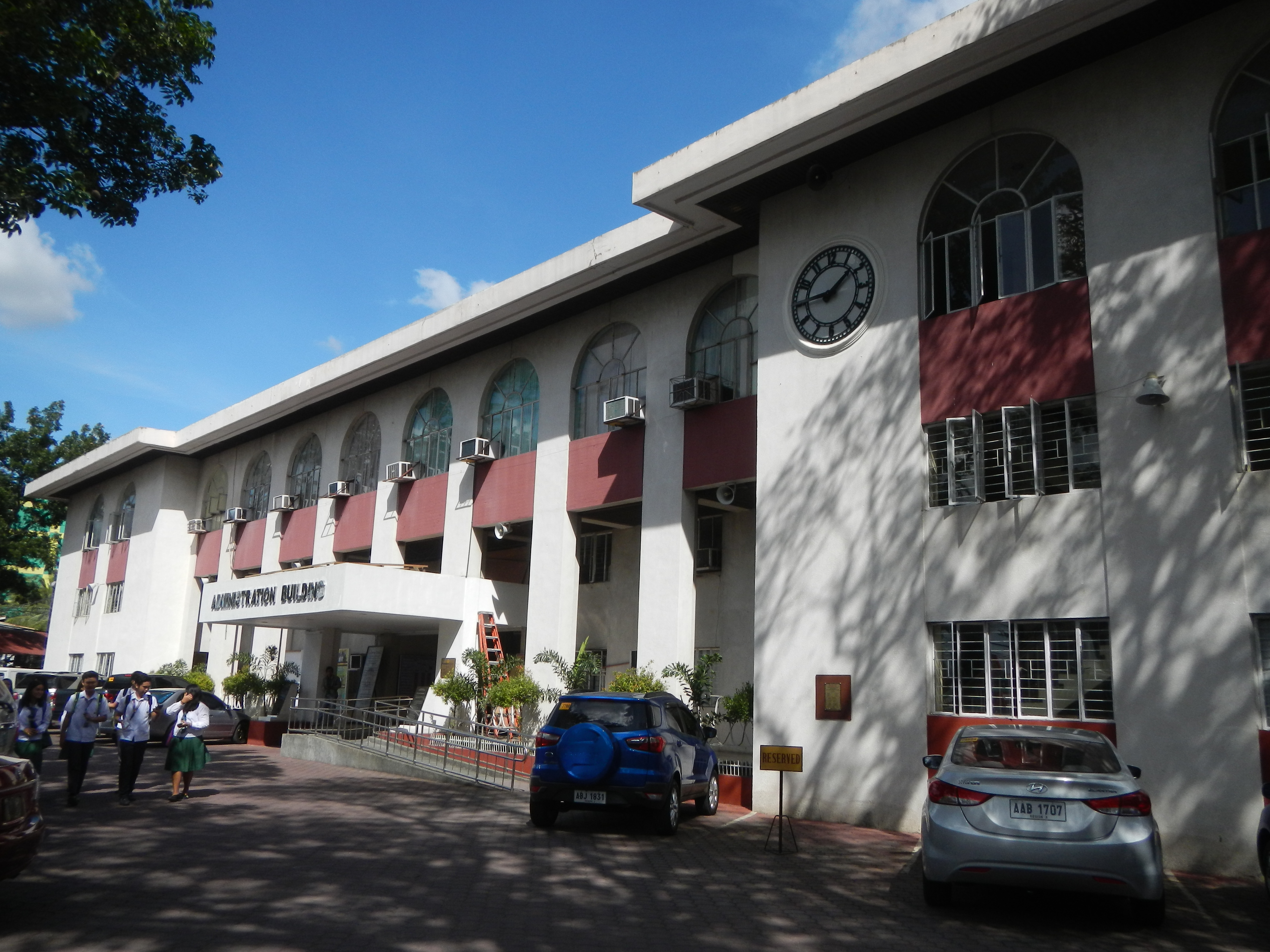
The Ninoy Aquino Hall located at the Main Campus

Five of the colleges that the university instituted (College of Engineering and Technology, College of Business and Accountancy, College of Arts and Social Sciences, College of Public Administration and Governance, and School of Law) are on the Main Campus. The Dr. Mario Manese Gymnasium or well known as the TSU Gymnasium, where large events in the university and in the province are usually held, is located here, along with the Administration Building, Main Library, and Business Center. Apart from the buildings and offices, there are places in the campus where students hang around such as the Heroes Park in front of the College of Arts and Social Sciences building, and a student center located on the College of Engineering grounds.

The university main campus is a 1.2-hectare property located along Romulo Boulevard, San Vicente, Tarlac City, near Diwa ng Tarlak. Most of the public utility vehicles in Tarlac pass through the campus.

The place where the College of Computer Studies building is located was the site of the Casa Real of Tarlac which once became an office of the late President Emilio Aguinaldo during the Philippine–American War. It is now recognized as a historical site by the National Historical Commission of the Philippines.

=== Lucinda Campus ===
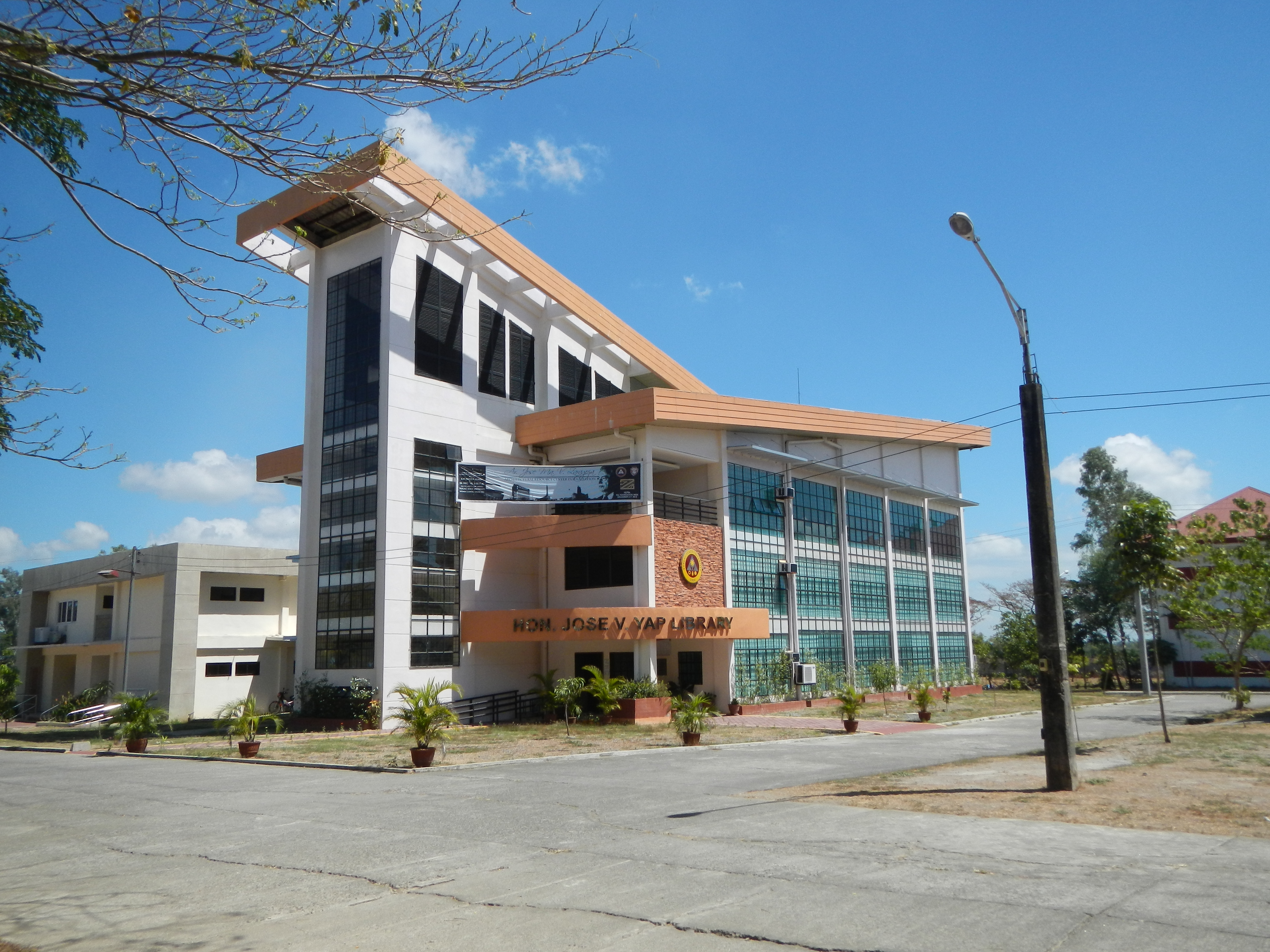
On August 17, 2012, the Jose V. Yap Library located at the Lucinda Campus was inaugurated.

The Villa Lucinda Campus is located in Brgy. Binauganan, Tarlac City, three kilometers away from the Main Campus. It has a total area of 10 hectares and houses the College of Teacher Education, College of Science, the College of Criminal Justice Education, and the Laboratory School. Due to the campus' spacious area, several offices and buildings were built here such as the University Hostel, Alumni Center, Hon. Jose V. Yap Library, and other structures. The activities of the Reserve Officers' Training Corps (ROTC) are also being performed within the campus.

The TSU Hostel was established in 2008 and started out as a venue for the practical training of Hotel and Restaurant Management students and for other university activities. As it developed over the years, it soon became a second home and school to foreign students, and was then made popular by its guests to cater to business and personal affairs.

Since the location of the campus lacks in transportation services, the university provides authorized shuttle vehicles for the students where they pay a fixed amount of price, as well as for the students from San Isidro Campus.

=== San Isidro Campus ===
TSU San Isidro Campus is situated on an eight-hectare property in Brgy. San Isidro, Tarlac City, some two kilometers away from the Main Campus. It houses the College of Computer Studies, College of Architecture and Fine Arts, and some facilities of the College of Engineering and Technology.

== Academics ==
The present student population is over 16,000. The university offers a total of 66 courses through its ten colleges. Recently, it started its Bachelor of Laws program (LL.B.) in cooperation of Integrated Bar of the Philippines (Tarlac Chapter). The university also offers degree programs to international students. A number of students from USA, China, Hong Kong, Korea, and India have attended and graduated from TSU.

Tarlac State University was recognized as one of the state universities and colleges in the country with the most number of curricular programs granted with Accreditation Status by the Accrediting Agency of Chartered Colleges and Universities in the Philippines (AACCUP).

College founding
College	Year founded
College of Teacher Education	1965
College of Engineering and Technology	1969
College of Business and Accountancy	1978
College of Architecture and Fine Arts	1984
College of Computer Studies	1996
College of Arts and Social Science	2000
College of Science	2000
College of Public Administration and Governance	2005
School of Law	2007
College of Criminal Justice Education	2012

=== Colleges ===
- College of Business and Accountancy
- College of Teacher Education
- College of Engineering and Technology
- College of Arts and Social Sciences
- College of Criminal Justice Education
- College of Architecture and Fine Arts
- College of Computer Studies
- College of Public Administration and Governance
- College of Science
- School of Law

=== Laboratory school ===
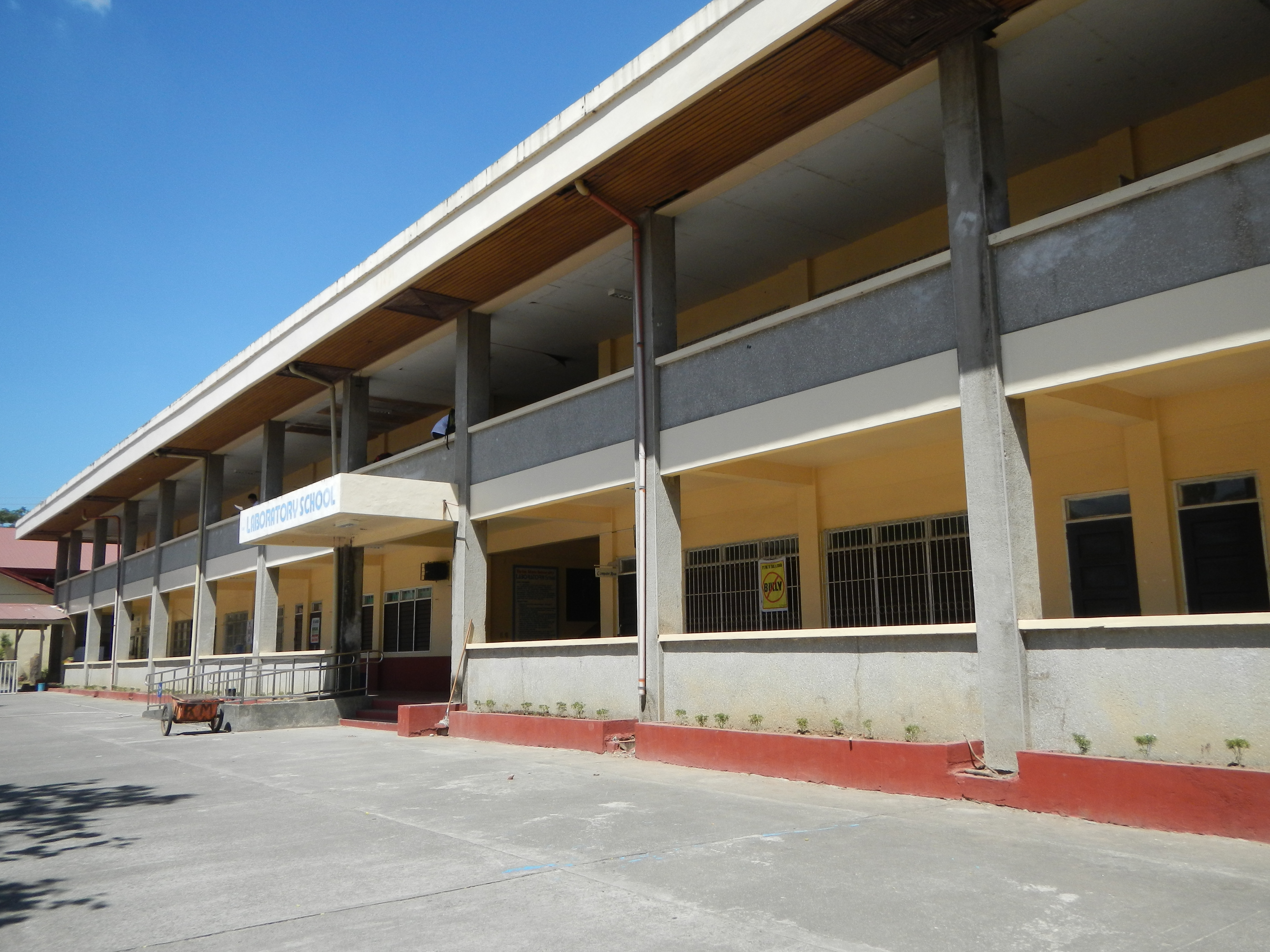
The main building of the university's Laboratory School

Tarlac State University - Laboratory School (commonly referred to as Lab School or TSU-LS) was a secondary school in Tarlac City founded in 1985. It was officially under the College of Education, serving as a training ground for the practice teachers of the university. Its old building, now occupied by BS Criminology students, is located at Lucinda Campus in Binauganan, Tarlac City along with the College of Teacher Education and College of Science.

TSU-LS was known in the province for the academic and athletic repute of its students. It had received several awards from different competitions during its active years, one of which was its title as the regional champion in National Cheerleading Championship in Central Luzon.

In 2005, a proposition suggesting to stop the operation of Laboratory School was raised due to the inability of the provincial government to support it, but this was not implemented and the school continued to operate. However, after over 10 years, the decision was finalized in accordance with a resolution of the university's board of regents despite strong opposition from students, parents, and teachers of the school. In April 2016, the last commencement ceremony of the school was held with Norbina Genever Castro as the last principal.

== Culture and student life ==
=== Student organizations ===
Student organizations in Tarlac State University were established for the purpose of providing opportunities to undergraduate students to explore and enhance their academic, cultural, political, spiritual, and social interests as students and as a part of the institution.

The highest student body in the university is the Supreme Student Council (SSC) which is administered by student leaders guided by the university administration. It is composed of a president, vice president, and five senators. The elected president will serve as a member of the university's Board of Regents for the whole term. In every college, there are also College Student Councils (CSC), headed by a governor, that provide voluntary service to the students.

One of university's distinguished organizations is the TSU Performing Arts which has achieved national and international recognition over the past years. Its Dance Troupe yearly participates in the International Folklore Festival, while its TSU Chorale competes in national competitions and even in abroad. In March 2016, TSU Dance Troupe won in World Artistic Dance Federation-European Championship in Moscow.

Student organizations are under the administration of the Office of Student Affairs (OSA).

=== Publication ===
Cover page of the 2014 magazine issue of The Work

The predominant media outlet on campus is The Work, a student-run newspaper and the official student publication of the university. The Work circulates its regular issue at least four times in an academic year and its literary folio, Obra, once per year. Formed in 1948, it is one of the leading student publications in the region with numerous awards from different journalism competitions. It is a member of the College Editors Guild of the Philippines (CEGP). TSU Bulletin, on the other hand, is published monthly by the Office of Public Affairs and Information (OPAI) supplemented by an online edition on the university website.

In addition, each college runs its own student publication. The Oracle (College of Arts and Social Sciences), The Blaze (College of Business and Accountancy), Educators' Gazette (College of Education), The Bureaucrat (College of Public Administration and Governance) and other college publications usually release their regular issues every semester.

=== Athletics ===
TSU participates in SUC-III (State Universities and Colleges in Region III) Olympics annually. Most of the delegates are winners from the university intramurals. Those who win in the regional level qualify for the State Colleges and Universities Athletic Association (SCUAA) National Olympics. Moreover, TSU Firefox cheerleading team has been consistently qualifying to the National Cheerleading Championship (NCC) lately. In 2013, it won the third place in Cheerleading category under elite division.

One of the priorities of the university is its athletes. The institution provides scholarship grants to the athletes who win gold, silver, and bronze medal during regional and national tournaments as exchange for their contribution to the university's achievements.

=== Intramurals ===
Tarlac State University holds its university intramurals every academic year where representatives from all colleges compete in different sports. Before, it was held as a five-day event in the university, but in 2015, the administration changed it to a month-long event. Major sport events during intramurals include basketball, football, volleyball, cheerleading and dance sports.

During opening ceremony, the university gymnasium reaches its full capacity as hundreds of students show their support to their respective colleges and athletes which eventually became a practice.

=== Foundation week ===
As a significant part of TSU's tradition and history, Foundation Week was established as a week of celebration, remembrance, and honoring of what the university has achieved over the years. Among the traditions that are practiced during the week are street dance parade and showdowns, lantern making contests, search for Festival King and Queen, organizations' Olympics, annual service awarding ceremony, and different booths and exhibits.

In 2006, TSU commemorated its 100 years of service to the people of the province and the region. Its centennial anniversary marks its firm foundation as an institution which was first introduced as a simple trade school in 1906. In 2014, TSU celebrated its Silver Anniversary as a state university and its 108th Foundation Celebration.

=== Student activism ===
The university's activism culture began during the 1970s when martial rule was declared by Ferdinand Marcos in 1972. Numerous student organizations voluntarily campaigned against the Marcos dictatorship. In retaliation, student body leaders were imprisoned by military officials, some of which were murdered and branded as communist insurgents. Nonetheless, student activism did not waned, and continued throughout the era. Student organizations of Tarlac State University were one of the organizations which campaigned in Central Luzon against the Marcoses despite odds with Marcos supporters in the neighboring province of Pangasinan. During the People Power Revolution in 1986, without knowledge of the university administration, university student leaders marched in EDSA in support of Corazon Aquino, which later led to the ouster of Ferdinand Marcos.

When democracy was restored by Corazon Aquino, student activism shifted to the American base issue and land reform. Student activism eventually waned during the term of Fidel Ramos. Student leaders again marched in 2001 in support of the ouster of Joseph Estrada. Activism waned again during the Arroyo administration and Noynoy Aquino's administration.

== Administration ==
Tarlac State University is administered by the 12 members of its Board of Regents. Ronald L. Adamat, CHED commissioner, is the chairperson and presiding officer of the board. Officials assigned by the government, the university president, presidents of the faculty and personnel union, alumni association, and student council, and representatives from private sector are the other members composing the board. The board has the power to prescribe rules for its own government and to enact for the government of the university such rules and regulations not contrary to law, as may be necessary to carry out the purposes and functions of the university.

The institution, including all its campuses, is headed by the university president. The president is assisted by four vice presidents—for academic affairs, administration and finance, research and extension services, and institutional linkages and external affairs.

Tarlac State University Presidents
Name	Term
Mario Manese	1965–1972
Jack Smith	1972–1984
Ernesto Cosme	1984–1990
Alejandro Fernandez	1990–1994
Rodolfo Baking	1994–1996
Dolores G. Matias	1998–2006
Priscilla C. Viuya	2006–2014
Myrna Q. Mallari	2014–2022
Arnold E. Velasco	2022–present

=== University key officials ===
- President

Arnold E. Velasco

- Vice Presidents

Agnes M. Macaraeg, Academic Affairs
Grace N. Rosete, Administration
Murphy P. Mohammed, Research Development and Extension
Nino B. Corpuz, Planning and Quality Assurance

=== Research, Extension and Development ===
In 2006, with the start of the administration headed by the University President, Priscilla C. Viuya, the Office of the Vice President for Planning, Research, Extension and Training (VP-PRET) was under the helm of Brigido Corpuz. The offices under the VP-PRET were the Planning and Development Office, University Research Office, University Extension Office, Office of the Alumni Affairs, Center for Tarlaqueño Studies, Institute of Local Government Administration, and the University Training Office.

On February 15, 2008, Glenard Madriaga was designated as the new vice president for PRET in lieu of the designation of Corpuz as vice president for production. Moreover, the name of the office was changed to vice president for research, extension and development (VP-RED) when the organizational structure of TSU was revised and approved in August 2008 by the BOR. With the changes was the transfer of the PDO under the Office of the University President and the UTO to the Office of Production. The rest of the offices were retained while new ones were attached, namely the Gender and Development and Intellectual Property Office.

The vice president for research, extension and development focused on fulfilling the mandates of each of the attached office. Some programs, projects and activities were planned and implemented that would accent the comparative advantage of the university. In fact, good reviews were reported by the University Planning Office on the accomplishments of offices under the VP-RED.

== Affiliations ==
=== Membership ===
- Philippine Association of State Universities and Colleges (PASUC)
- Association of Universities of Asia and the Pacific (AUAP)
- International Association of University Presidents (IAUP)
- Asia University Federation (AUF)
- Accrediting Agency of Chartered Colleges and Universities in the Philippines (AACCUP), Inc.
- State Colleges and Universities Athletic Association, Region III (SCUAA III)
- Central Luzon Association of Higher Educational Institutions
- Central Luzon Association of Regional Officers
- Central Luzon Industry and Energy Research and Development Consortium Foundation, Inc.
- Association of Schools of Public Administration in the Philippines, Incorporated (ASPAP, Inc.)
- Philippine Science Consortium
- United Central Luzon Athletic Association (UCLAA)
- Women's National Collegiate Athletic Association (Philippines)

=== International partnership ===
Tarlac State University has shown efforts to globalize as it continually develops its linkages with foreign universities and colleges.

Listed below are some of the university's global alliance:

- Ho Chi Minh City University of Technology, Vietnam
- Hanoi University of Industry, Vietnam
- Hong Kong Lifelong College
- Guang Hua Nurse Fund, China
- Hyupsung University, South Korea
- Yeungjin College, South Korea
- Busan Presbyterian University, South Korea
- Sunchon National University, South Korea
- Maejo University, Thailand
- Namseoul University, South Korea
- Korea Tourism College, South Korea
- Hong Kong Management Association

== Notable people ==
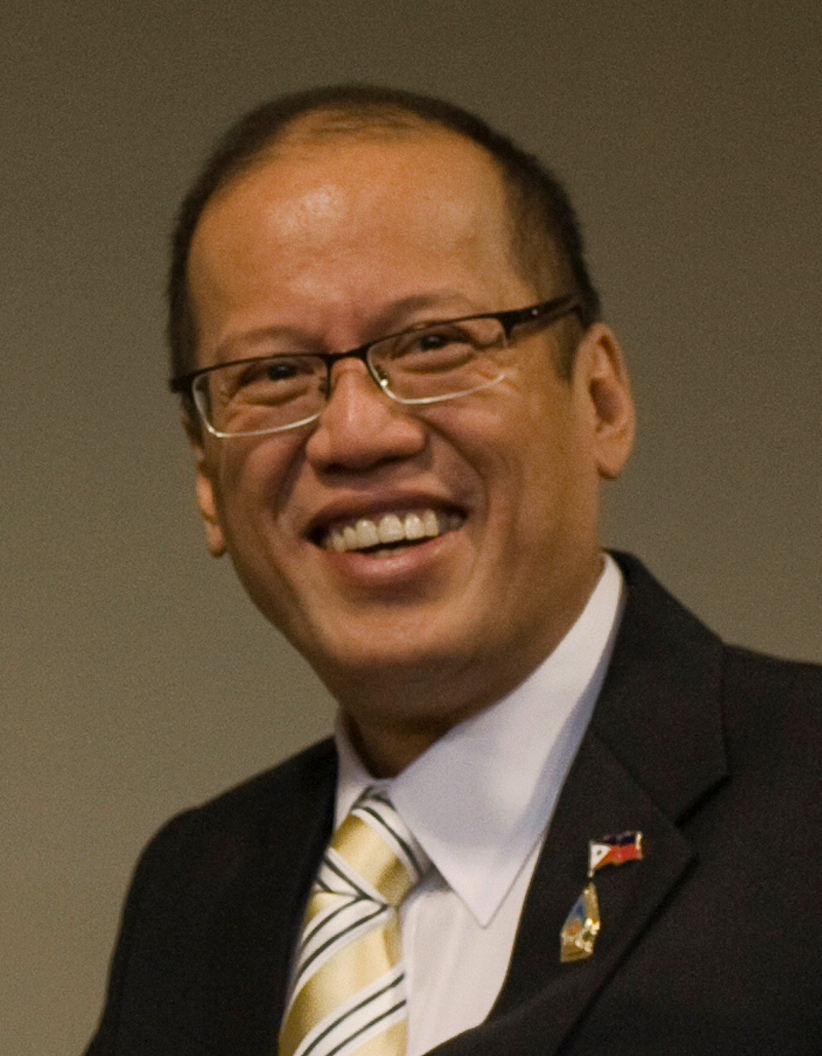
Benigno Simeon C. Aquino III

People associated with Tarlac State University include government officials, faculty members, businessmen, and honorary award recipients.

The late Hon. Benigno Simeon Aquino III, the 15th president of the Philippines, was an honorary alumnus of the university. He was conferred a Doctor of Humanities degree (honoris causa) by TSU on May 14, 2015, at the Malacañang Palace for his "distinguished political career and service to the Filipino people as Representative of the Second Legislative District of Tarlac Province in the House of Representatives from 1998 to 2007, Senator of the Philippine Senate, 14th Congress of the Philippines from 2007 to 2010, and as Fifteenth President of the Republic of the Philippines from 2010 to 2016."

Government officials who attended the university include Dr. Vicente R. Vicmudo, former regional director of the National Irrigation Administration. He acquired his master's degree in public administration from Tarlac State University in 1993 with distinction as an outstanding graduate. Hon. Amado De Leon, a Filipino politician who served as a board member of Tarlac Province and councilor of Tarlac City. Dr. Philip B. Ibarra, the fourth president of Tarlac College of Agriculture in Camiling, Tarlac, who received Civil Service Commission (CSC) Pagasa Award in 2008 for his masterful stewardship of the college's human capital.
