= Common room =

Type of shared lounge, often in dorms

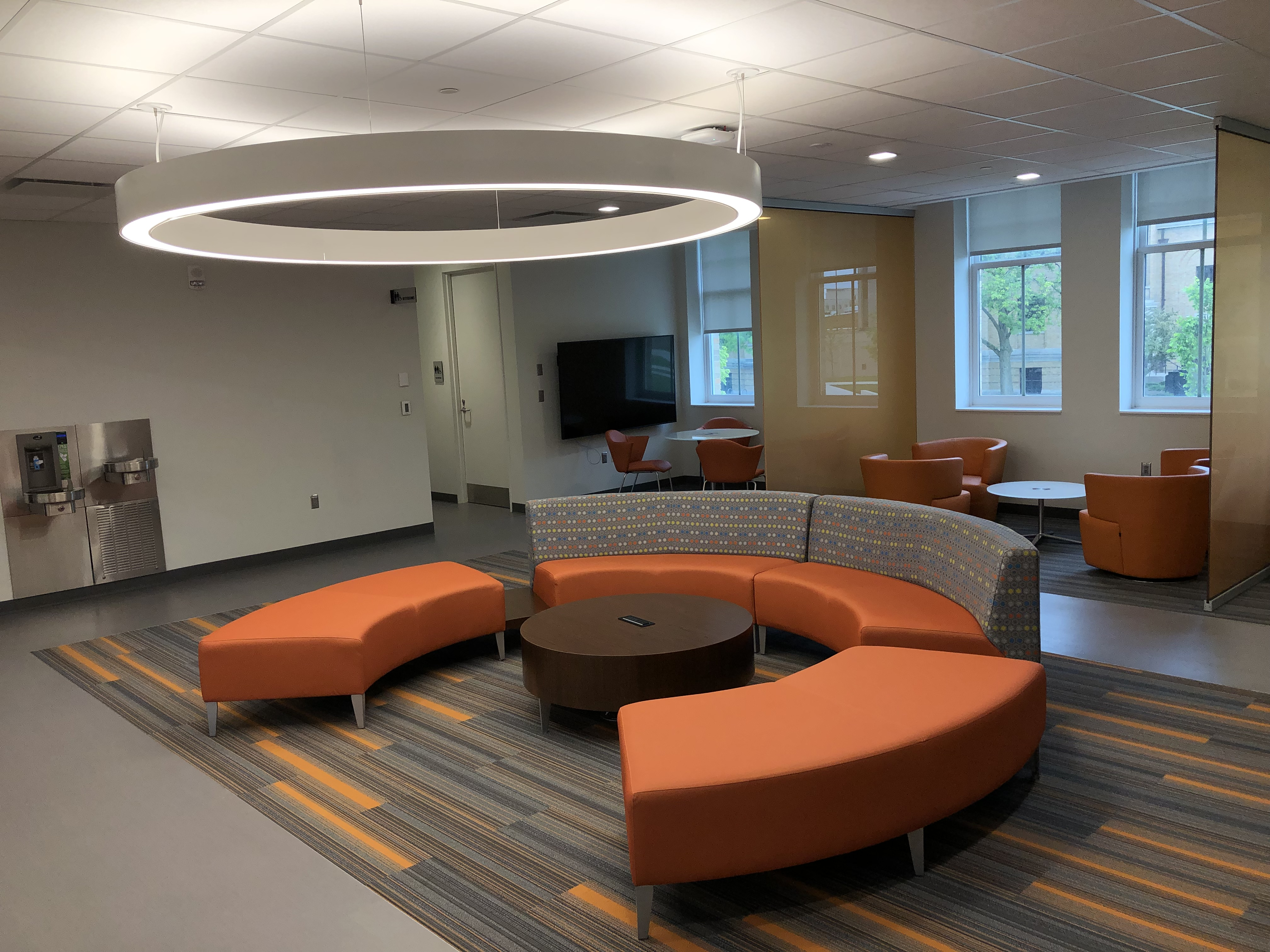
A dual purpose common room and informal meeting space in Moseley Hall at Bowling Green State University.

A common room or student lounge is a type of shared lounge, most often found in halls of residence or dormitories, at universities, colleges, and sometimes military bases, hospitals, rest homes, hostels, and minimum-security prisons. They are often found in secondary schools and sixth form colleges, where they are designed to give students a space for relaxation and study.

Regular features include couches, televisions, coffee tables, and other generic lounge furniture for socializing. Depending on its location and purpose of use, a common room may be known by another name. For instance, in mental hospitals, where access is usually restricted to the daytime hours, this type of room is often called a "day room". In Singapore, the term usually refers to a bedroom without attached bathroom in an HDB apartment unit.

Bulacan State University student lounge construction in 2024

A 2003 study on the success of female physics majors found that the existence of a well-maintained student lounge was a marker of high success rates. Several studies conducted regarding gossip patterns have chosen the student lounge as an excellent choice for an unregulated environment. It has been noted that distance-learning courses should strive to provide a similar environment for casual conversation. The University of Texas held a contest to design its student lounges. The design of some student lounges have even won awards for the architects for their creations.

== Gallery ==
Common rooms around the world

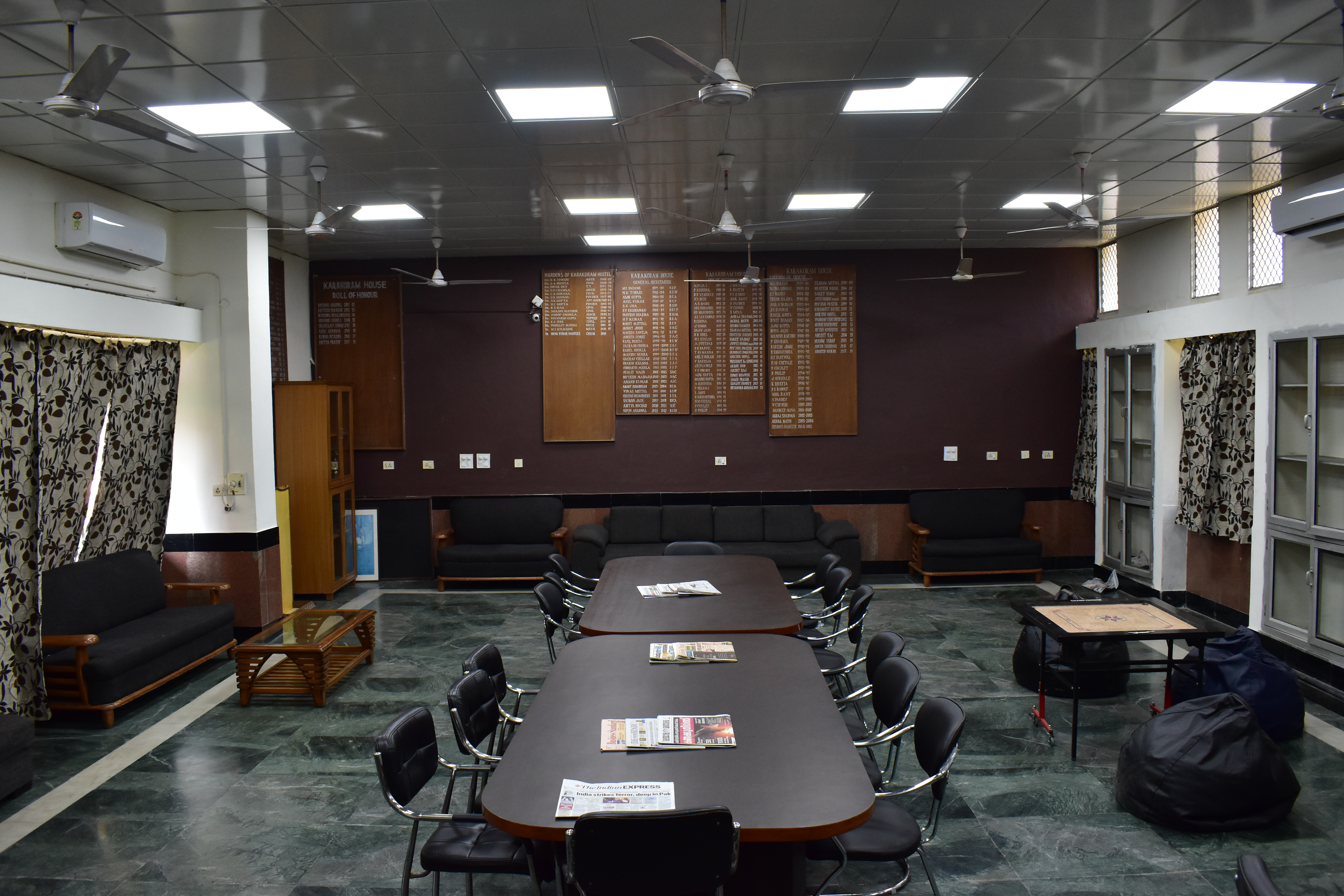
Common room from Karakoram Hostel, I.I.T. Delhi

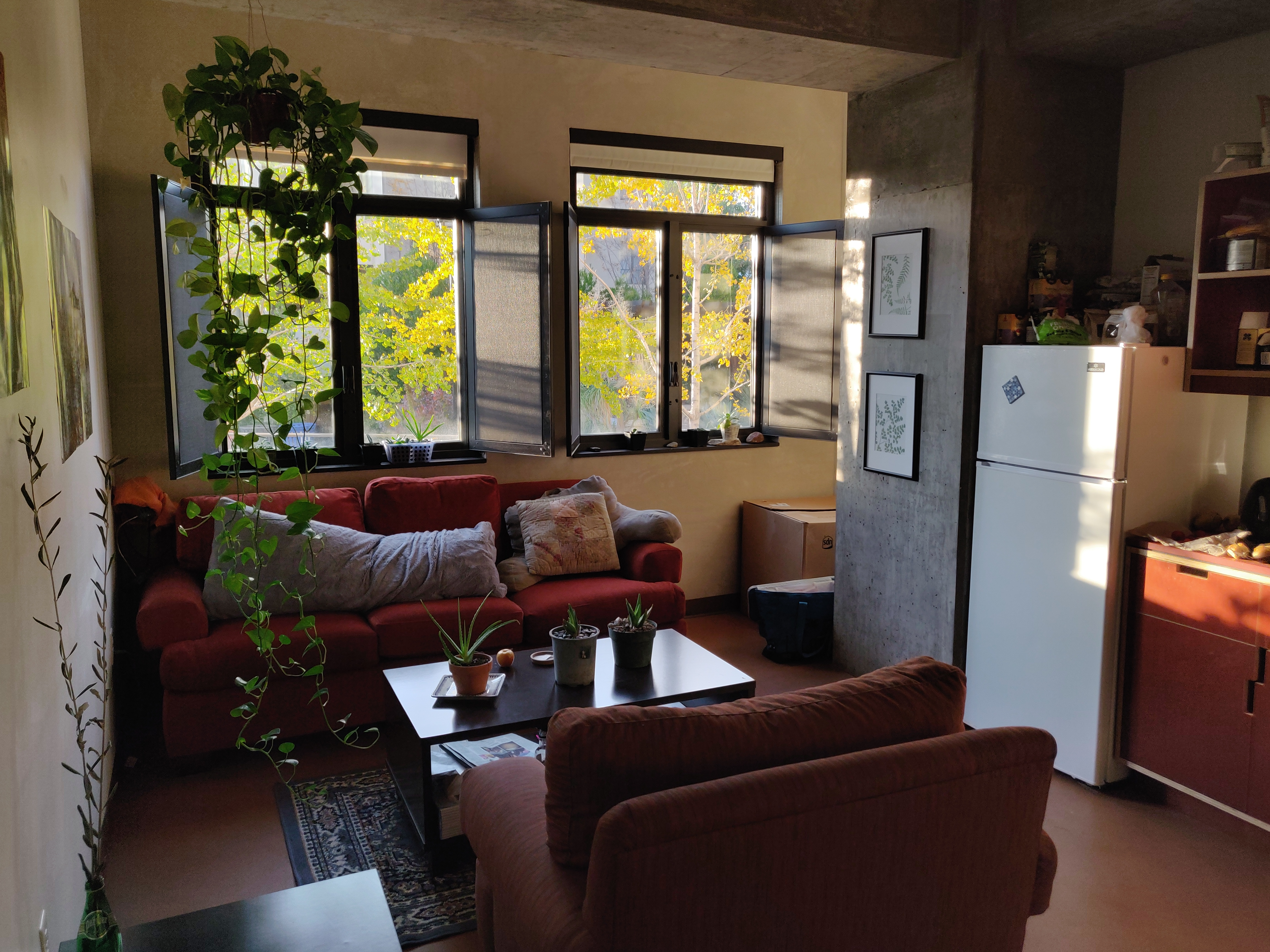
Private common room in a residential suite at Pomona College in California
(view as a 360° interactive panorama)

== See also ==
- Common area
- Common room (university)
