= Tarlac State University – Laboratory School =

Public high school in Tarlac, Philippines

Tarlac State University Laboratory High School
- Binauganan, Tarlac City; Philippines

Information
- Type: Public
- Motto: Aim high, soar high!
- Established: 1985 (first established); 2021 (reinstitution)
- Closed: 2015 (Note: First established before TSU had reinstituted the Laboratory School in 2021.)
- Principal: Dr. Mellany G. Masangkay
- Grades: 7 to 12
- Enrollment: Around 500
- Campus size: 10 hectares
- Colors: Blue and White
- Nickname: Blue Eagles
- Newspaper: The Work Jr.
- Yearbook: The Spark Jr.
- Website: tsu.edu.ph

Tarlac State University - Laboratory High School (Lab School or TSU-LS) is a secondary school in Tarlac City, Philippines. It was established in 1985 under the College of Education of Tarlac State University, aiming to help undergraduate students of the college in their practice teaching.

The school was located at Lucinda Campus, a 10-hectare property of the University in Binauganan, Tarlac City, along with the College of Education and College of Science.

== History ==
In 2005, a proposition suggesting to stop its operation was presented due to the inability of the provincial government to support the school. This order was not implemented and it continued to operate. However, after over 10 years, the decision to stop the school's operation was finalized. On April 1, 2016, the last commencement ceremony was conducted for its last batch of students.

On September 1, 2021, the board of directors of TSU had announced that the Laboratory School will be reinstituted along with offering the Science, Technology, Engineering and Mathematics (STEM) strand in Senior High School, on the later accepting Junior High School students in school year 2022-2023 in July 9, 2022.

== Achievements ==
Laboratory School had received numerous awards in both academic and athletic competitions in citywide and national level. One of the school's profound achievements is its Hall of Fame award in 2007 for being the first school to win grand champion in five-consecutive years in Malatarlak Festival Street Dancing Competition. Lately, Laboratory School has been participating in the National Cheerleading Championship.

== Faculty ==
The last director of TSU-LS was Prof. Norbina Genever M. Castro, who presided over Prof. Ma. Shinette P. Morales (Chairman, Academic Department), Prof. Mellany G. Masangkay (Chairman, Makabayan Department), Engr. Estrella B. Pagco (Research Chairman), Dr. Cynthia G. Quiambao (Alumni Coordinator), Dr. Godofredo Lacanilao (Coordinator for Extension Services), Engr. Willie I. Alagano (Coordinator for Gender and Development, College Statistician and CSC Financial Adviser), Mr. Douglas C. Ferrer (Coordinator for Training and Development Services and CSC Political Adviser), and Mrs. Victorina V. Yu (Sports Coordinator).

As a part of the university, the school became a training ground for the Education students where they taught high school students as substitute of the faculty members. TSU-LS faculty members included: Daisy Pangilinan, Jeremy Canlas, Nelvin Nool, Marichu Aznar, Dr. Chona Conte, Sharon Galbadores, Nerissa Olarte, Judeo Herrera, Engr. Agliam, Alvin Tan, Ramachandra Torres, and Mark Liherson Mateo (Clerk).

== Publications ==
TSU-LS published its student newspaper, The Work Jr., thrice every school year, while the literary magazine Prose and Poets was published once a year. The school also published its student yearbook called The Spark Jr. occasionally.
