= Tarlac Agricultural University =

Public university in Tarlac, Philippines

- Pamantasang Pang-agrikultura ng Tarlac (Filipino)
- Official logo of Tarlac Agricultural University
- Former name: Tarlac College of Agriculture
- Type: Public university
- Established: 1945; 81 years ago
- Affiliations: PASUC; SCUAA
- Budget: ₱151 million (2015)
- President: Dr. Silverio Ramon DC. Salunson
- Students: 3,409 (2014)
- Location: Camiling, Tarlac, Philippines; 15°38′4″N 120°24′53″E
- Campus: Urban
- Student newspapers: Golden Harvest, The Tillers
- Colors: Green and White
- Website: www.tca.edu.ph
- Location in the Philippines

Tarlac Agricultural University (TAU), formerly the Tarlac College of Agriculture, is a public university in the province of Tarlac, Philippines. It is mandated to provide professional, technical and instruction for special purposes and to promote research extension services and progressive leadership in agriculture, agricultural education, home technology and other related fields. Its main campus is located in Malacampa, Camiling, Tarlac.

TCA derives its legal mandate as an autonomous state agricultural college from Presidential Decree (PD) 609 dated December 18, 1974, which officially terminated its merger with the Tarlac College of Technology, now Tarlac State University (TSU). As highlighted in PD 609, TCA is mandated to undertake instruction, research and extension including production programs in agriculture, agricultural engineering, veterinary science, forestry and natural resources management in Central Luzon.

The college was converted into a state university, the Tarlac Agricultural University, on May 10, 2016, by virtue of Republic Act No. 10800.

== History ==
The Tarlac College of Agriculture was established in 1944 as Camiling Boys/Girls High School. It started with 368 students, 13 faculty members and a school principal. But it stopped operation in December 1944 and resumed after the Liberation as Tarlac High School, Camiling Branch. The reopening of the school was a response to the clamor of parents whose children stopped schooling during the war years and the difficulty of traveling from Camiling to Tarlac.

On July 6, 1945, Municipal Resolution No. 34 created the Camiling Vocational Agriculture School (CVAS) replacing Tarlac High School, Camiling branch. Its focus on vocational agriculture was considered a means to hasten the economic recovery of the town from the ravages of the war. CVAS had 534 students and 13 faculty. From 1945 to 1948, the school offered two curricula – the general academic to enable the former students to graduate and the agriculture curriculum for the first year and second year. On September 26, 1946, the school was renamed Camiling Rural High School (CRHS). In 1948, the general curriculum was phased out.

Early in 1952, the Director of Public Schools served notices that the school should be relocated to a permanent site and increase the declining enrollment. Otherwise it might be closed or transferred to another town. The most conducive for an agricultural school's expansion was found in Malacampa, a barangay seven kilometers away from the town proper. In June 1953, the school with 155 students and eight faculty moved to the new site. Classrooms and offices were made of bamboos and nipa in the “middle of a wilderness.” Funds from FOA-PHILCUSA later came and permanent buildings replaced the bamboo structures.

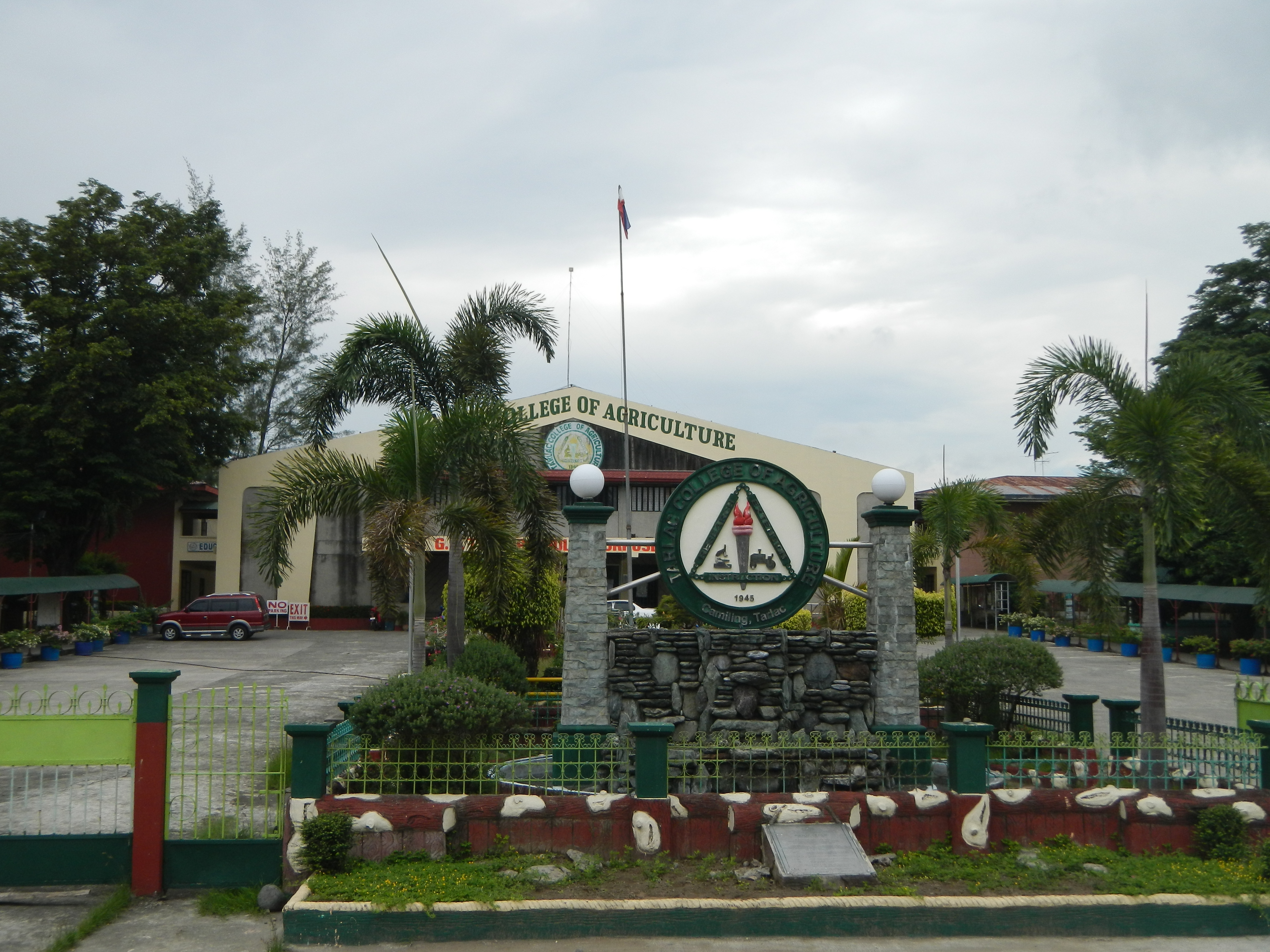
TCA facade (Camiling, Tarlac)

Expansion and development was accelerated when CRHS was converted to Tarlac National Agricultural School (TNAS) in 1957, under a superintendent. It became a policy to make all projects profitable – piggery, poultry, goat and vegetables. Linkaging for research started from pork barrel funds. In 1961, the two-year technical agriculture post secondary course was opened and in 1963, the Health Center was built out of funds from the Philippine Charity Sweepstakes. By that time, TNAS already had a school hymn and a student publication, The Carabao.

In 1965, TNAS and Tarlac School of Arts and Trades (TSAT) were merged to become the Tarlac College of Technology. TNAS became TCT-College of Agriculture (TCT-CA) while TSAT became the Tarlac College of Technology – College of Arts and Trades (TCT-CAT) by virtue of RA 4337. As TCT-CA, it offered three degree programs: Bachelor of Science in Elementary Education major in Elementary Agriculture or Home Economics (BSEEd); Bachelor of Science in agriculture (BSA) major in Crop Science/Animal Science; and Bachelor of Science in Agricultural Engineering (BSAEng’g). Government programs related to agriculture, especially after the declaration of Martial Law in 1972 gave a boost to the enrollment in these courses. Graduates found immediate employment here and abroad. From all indications the school could well become autonomous.

Thus, on December 18, 1974, by virtue of PD 609 issued by President Ferdinand E. Marcos, Tarlac College of Agriculture became one of the state colleges in the country. The first college president was Mr. Jose L. Milla. During President Milla's stewardship, the campus area was increased to 60 hectares; a forestry laboratory in Kiti Calao, Mayantoc, was acquired through PD 1506; Fishery was added to the existing production projects and joint researches with IRRI were undertaken. Enrollment further increased and the number of faculty and non-teaching.

The second college president was Robustiano J. Estrada. Upon his assumption, the ten-year development program and the TCA Code were prepared. There was a major reorganization in the administrative set up of the college. Two vice-presidents were designated: the vice-president for Administrative and Business Affairs took care of the non-academic staff and functions; and the Vice- President for Academic Affairs was in charge of the academic programs now based in different institutes under a dean. There was an exodus of faculty to take graduate studies because of the promotion scheme of state universities and colleges that gave highest point to educational attainment.

Infrastructure development was also accelerated by Estrada. Academic buildings rose to accommodate enrollment that reached thousands and which increased every year. Twenty-one faculty cottages, the Girls' Dorm and Boys' Dorm, a guest house, six-door staff apartment, a research and development building, a multi-purpose building, the Administration cum library and the chapel were all constructed. The old structures were repaired and PAG-ASA established an Agro-Metrological Station. These gave a new look to the campus. By then the campus has expanded to 70 hectares, including a 4-hectare athletic oval. Research and Extension also expanded and the TCA became a byword among households in the service area. The production projects also increased, notably rice, vegetables, piggery, poultry, goat, cattle, nursery, fruit trees, seedlings and canteen service. Feliciano S. Rosete became the 3rd President of TCA when Estrada's term expired in 1989. During the first five years of Rosete's term, other infrastructures came about. The landmark was the Farmers’ Training Center built from the Countrywide Development Fund (CDF) of the then Senator Alberto G. Romulo. It was also during Pres. Rosete's term that scholarships from private individuals and NGOs started pouring in, and more curricular programs were offered. Extension and Research accomplishments also multiplied.

In 2001, Philip B. Ibarra stepped in as the fourth president of TCA. During his tenure, the institution updated its curriculum, computerized its enrollment and administrative systems, acquired additional financial and material resources, and expanded partnerships(locally and internationally). Max P. Guillermo succeeded Ibarra as president on January 14, 2010. He introduced initiatives like "TCA at 2015" which outlined institutional development plans focused on innovation and program strength.

The second term of the president unfolds more aggressive realization of the goals of the college to pursue opportunities through external relations such as sending OJT students abroad, faculty exchange, research paper presentations and forging partnerships with universities in Asia and the world over. More outputs and completion of programs, projects and activities will be generated through the collective efforts of the administration, faculty and staff as well as the students and partner agencies. The incessant establishment of linkages with various sectors intensifies TCA's presence to be more visible. TCA will brace more challenges of the ASEAN 2015 and globalization at a greater sphere.

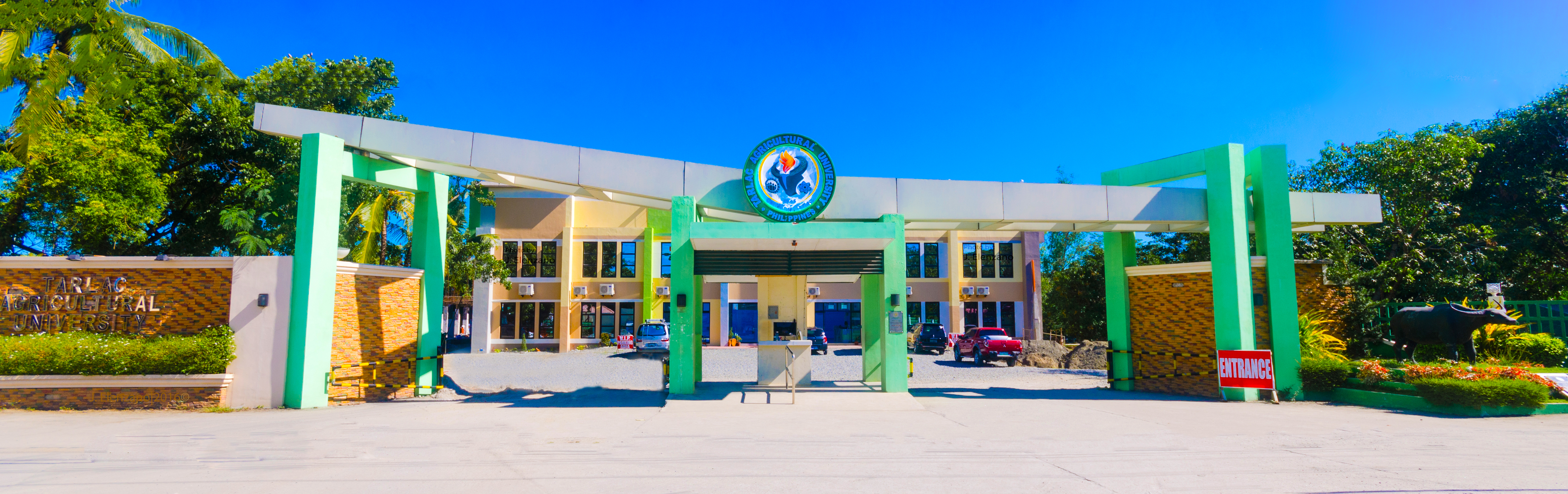
The panoramic view of the Tarlac Agricultural University Facade

The Tarlac College of Agriculture (TCA), home of agriculture-based scientific technology in Tarlac, is now Tarlac Agricultural University (TAU). Signed on May 10, 2016, by His Excellency Benigno S. Aquino III, Republic Act No. 10800 formally converted TCA to TAU, making the institution the first state college in the country to be converted into a university through the Merit Evaluation System of the Commission on Higher Education (CMO No. 46, S. 2012); another first for the institution.

== Science tourism ==
- Tarlac Agricultural University. The public university offers a place for agro-ecotourism excursion. Its three main exploration facilities such as the Bamboo Park, Agro - Ecotourism and The Research and Production district provides an ambiance of a Rural tourism and Agricultural science based activities. The university has the Ecotourism Hostel, Continuing Education Center and Bamboo Training Center for Accommodation and Seminars/Training services. It has also the TAU Function hall.

== Symbol ==
The carabao has always been the symbol of the Tarlac College of Agriculture. The carabao is seen as resilient even through the ages.

== Colleges and courses offered ==
=== College of Agriculture and Forestry ===
Dr. Edmar N. Franquera, Dean, CAF.

- Doctor of Philosophy: majors in Agronomy, Animal Science, Crop Science, Rural Development
- Master of Science in Agriculture: majors in Agricultural Extension, Agronomy, Farming System Development, Animal Science, Horticulture
- Master of Science in Forestry: majors in Community Development, Reforestation Management
- Bachelor of Science in agriculture (BSA): majors in Agronomy, Crop Protection, Horticulture, Animal Science, Soil Science, Agricultural Extension, Agricultural Economics, Agroforestry
- Bachelor of Animal Science (BAS)
- Bachelor of Science in Food Technology (BSFT)
- Bachelor of Science in Forestry (BSF)
- Certificate in Agriculture (two years)
- Certificate in Animal Technology (two years)
- Certificate in Landscaping (two years)
- Forest Ranger Course

=== College of Arts and Sciences ===
Dr. Sherwin S. Alar, Dean, CAS.

- Bachelor of Arts in Economics (AB Econ)
- Bachelor of Science in Psychology (BS Psych)
- Bachelor of Science in Development Communication (BS DevComm)

=== College of Business and Management ===
Dr. Siverio Ramon DC. Salunson, Dean, CBM.

- Bachelor of Science in Entrepreneurship
- Bachelor of Science in Agribusiness
- Bachelor of Science in Business Administration: majors in Human Resources Development Management and Business Management, Financial Management, Marketing Management

=== College of Education ===
Dr. Claire Ann A. Olivares, Dean, CED.

- Doctor of Philosophy in Development Education
- Master of Arts in Education: majors in Educational Management, General Science, Mathematics
- Bachelor of Elementary Education: majors in General Education, Pre-School Education
- Bachelor of Secondary Education: major in Physical Science, Mathematics, Technology and Livelihood Education (TLE)
- Bachelor of Science in Home Technology Management
- Certificate in Home Technology
- Laboratory School Programs
  - Secondary Science & Technology Curriculum
  - Secondary Agri-Home Curriculum

=== College of Engineering and Technology ===
Dr. Leonell P. Lijauco, Dean, CET.

- Master of Science in Agricultural Engineering: majors in Farm Mechanization, Soil and Water Management, Irrigation and Drainage
- Bachelor of Science in Agricultural Engineering: majors in Crop Processing, Soil and Water Management
- Bachelor of Science in Geodetic Engineering
- Bachelor of Science in Information Technology
- Certificate in Computer Hardware Technology
- Certificate in Office Management

=== College of Veterinary Medicine ===
Dr. Ma. Asuncion G. Beltran, Dean, CVM.

- Doctor of Veterinary Medicine
