= 2007 National Cheerleading Championship =

National Cheerleading Championship Season 2
Tournament information
- Location: Philippines
- Dates: February 18, 2007–February 25, 2007
- Venues: PhilSports Arena (Finals); Le Pavilion (NCR Qualifiers)
- Participants: 15 teams

Final positions
- Champions: CCP Bobcats (1st College title); SSA Seagulls (1st High School title)
- 1st runners-up: UP Pep Squad (College); San Beda Red Lions (High School)
- 2nd runners-up: Altas Pep Squad (College); PCC Knights (High School)

The 2007 National Cheerleading Championship is the second season of the National Cheerleading Championship, a cheerleading competition for college and high school teams in the Philippines. It was the first season that had an open qualifiers. The winning teams from the previous season were also given automatic berths in the finals. The qualifiers were held on February 18, 2007, at the Le Pavilion, Metropolitan Park, Pasay, Metro Manila were 13 college teams and 10 high school teams vied for the spots in the finals.

The finals were held on February 25, 2007, at PhilSports Arena, PhilSports Complex, Pasig, Metro Manila with the CCP Bobcats of the Central Colleges of the Philippines and the SSA Seagulls of the School of St. Anthony declared as the champions for the college and high school divisions, respectively.

== Qualification ==
The open qualifiers was held on February 18, 2007, at the Le Pavilion, Metropolitan Park, Pasay, Metro Manila. 13 college teams and 10 high school teams participated in the open qualifiers.

Team placing

- Automatically qualified for being the defending champion of the previous season
- Qualified
- did not qualify

=== Participating teams ===
College

- UP Pep Squad (University of the Philippines Diliman)
- CCP Bobcats (Central Colleges of the Philippines)
- Mapúa Cardinals (Mapúa Institute of Technology)
- PUP Stars (Polytechnic University of the Philippines)
- Altas Perps Squad (University of Perpetual Help System DALTA)
- EAC Generals Pep Squad (Emilio Aguinaldo College)
- Ateneo Blue Babble Battalion (Ateneo de Cagayan University)
- Adamson Pep Squad (Adamson University)
- PUP–Taguig Pep Squad (Polytechnic University of the Philippines, Taguig)
- Lyceum Pep Squad (Lyceum of the Philippines University)
- PWU Wildcats (Philippine Women's University)
- RTU Technocrats (Rizal Technological University)
- The Gray Hawks Pep Squad (Technological University of the Philippines)

High School

- SSA Seagulls Pep Squad (School of Saint Anthony)
- SHS Pep Squad (School of the Holy Spirit)
- San Beda Red Lions (San Beda College Alabang)
- Poveda Hardcourt (St. Pedro Poveda College)
- PCC Pep Squad (Pasig Catholic College)
- AC Hardcourt (Assumption College)
- Stallions Pep Squad (Manuel L. Quezon University High School)
- The CMIC Fighting Vanguards (Children of Mary Immaculate College)
- DLSZ Pep Squad and Cheerdancers (De La Salle Santiago Zobel School)
- Green Jaguars (Manila High School)

=== College ===
Team	Basic elements	Tumbling	Stunts	Tosses/Pyramids	Deductions	Total score	Rank	Result
UP Pep Squad	61.5	64	69.5	68.5	-13	250.5	First place	Qualified
CCP Bobcats	60	58	69	72.5	-10	249.5	Second place	Qualified
Mapua Cheerping Cardinals	54.5	52.5	68	64.5	-23	216.5	Third place	Qualified
PUP Stars	53	54	59.5	59.5	-12	214	Fourth place	Qualified
Altas Perps Squad	50	49	65	63.5	-17	210.5	Fifth place	Qualified
EAC Generals Pep Squad	53.3	39.5	65.5	66	-15	209.3	Sixth place	Qualified
Ateneo Blue Babble Battalion	56.5	57	60	49	-18	204.5	Seventh place	Qualified
Adamson Pep Squad	53	58.5	53.5	54.5	-23	196.5	Eighth place	Qualified
PUP–Taguig Pep Squad	50.5	44	57.5	61.5	-23	190.5	Ninth place	Eliminated
Lyceum Pep Squad	44	49.5	55.5	52.5	-36	165.5	Tenth place	Eliminated
PWU Wildcats	43	45	54.5	41	-19	164.5	Eleventh place	Eliminated
RTU Technocrats	43	42	66	48	-36	163	Twelfth place	Eliminated
The Gray Hawks Pep Squad	41	37	53	42	-12	161	Thirteenth place	Eliminated

=== High school ===
Team	Basic elements	Tumbling	Stunts	Tosses/Pyramids	Deductions	Total score	Rank	Result
SSA Seagulls	61.5	66.5	67.5	69.5	-13	252	First place	Qualified
SHS Pep Squad	64.5	63	66	64.5	-15	243	Second place	Qualified
San Beda Red Lions	56.5	54	59	52.5	-8	214	Third place	Qualified
Poveda Hardcourt	59	67.5	62.5	38.5	-15	212.5	Fourth place	Qualified
PCC Pep Squad	55	49	65	64	-26	207	Fifth place	Qualified
AC Hardcourt	59	53	62	48.5	-37	185.5	Sixth place	Qualified
Stallions Pep Squad	45	48	55.5	50.5	-20	179	Seventh place	Qualified
The CMIC Fighting Vanguards	47	36.5	57.5	56.5	-35	162.5	Eighth place	Eliminated
DLSZ Pep Squad and Cheerdancers	46.5	44.5	54	44	-27	162	Ninth place	Eliminated
Green Jaguars	45.5	35	53	41	-21	153.5	Tenth place	Eliminated

== Finals ==
The finals were held on February 25, 2007, at PhilSports Arena, PhilSports Complex, Pasig, Metro Manila.

Team placing

- Winner
- Runner-up
- Third place

=== College ===
After the one-day open qualifiers, eight teams qualified for the finals.

Team	Basic elements	Tumbling	Stunts	Tosses	Pyramids	Deductions	Total score	Result
CCP Bobcats	62	54	60	66	70.5	-4	308.5	Champion
UP Pep Squad	61.5	61.5	61	62	71	-11	306	Runner-up
Altas Perp Squad	57	55.5	53.5	53.5	69.5	-6	283	Third place
EAC Generals Pep Squad	55.5	46.5	57.5	55	66	-4	276.5	Fourth place
Ateneo Blue Babble Battalion	59	55.5	50	47	64.5	-13	263	Fifth place
Adamson Pep Squad	56	55	52.5	48.5	66	-19	259	Sixth place
PUP–Taguig Pep Squad	52	45.5	49.5	48.5	65	-2	258.5	Seventh place
PUP Stars	49	46.5	50.5	49.5	64.5	-12	248	Eighth place

=== High school ===
Out of the ten teams that vied for the qualification in the competition, seven teams made it to the finals.

Team	Basic elements	Tumbling	Stunts	Tosses	Pyramids	Deductions	Total score	Result
SSA Seagulls	61.5	61.5	64.5	65	72.5	-9	316	Champion
San Beda Red Lions	59	60	54.5	60.5	69.5	-4	299.5	Runner-up
PCC Knights	58.5	59	61	59	68.5	-10	296	Third place
SHS Pep Squad	58.5	57	57.5	59	68	-14	286	Fourth place
Poveda Hardcourt	56.5	64	53	54	67.5	-25	270	Fifth place
AC Hardcourt	57.5	43.5	49.5	43	55.5	-32	217	Sixth place
MLQU Stallions Pep Squad	44.5	43	41.5	40.5	60	-15	214.5	Seventh place
