= 2006 National Cheerleading Championship =

National Cheerleading Championship Season 1
Tournament information
- Location: Philippines
- Dates: April 2, 2006–
- Venue: Araneta Coliseum
- Participants: 10 teams

Final positions
- Champions: UP Pep Squad (1st College title); Poveda Hardcourt (1st High School title)
- 1st runners-up: CCP Bobcats (College); SHS Pep Squad (High School)
- 2nd runners-up: Perpetual Help College (College); School of Saint Anthony (High School)

The 2006 National Cheerleading Championship is the first season of the National Cheerleading Championship, a cheerleading competition for college and high school teams in the Philippines. It was a one-time invitational and the inaugural cheerleading event held on April 2, 2006, at the Araneta Coliseum, Araneta Center, Quezon City.

== Participating teams ==
10 teams took part in the first season: 5 College teams, and 5 High School teams.

College

- UP Pep Squad (University of the Philippines Diliman)
- CCP Bobcats (Central Colleges of the Philippines)
- Perpetual Help College
- Adamson Falcons (Adamson University)
- Mapúa Cardinals (Mapúa Institute of Technology)

High School

- Poveda Hardcourt (St. Pedro Poveda College)
- SHS Pep Squad (School of the Holy Spirit)
- SSA Seagulls Pep Squad (School of Saint Anthony)
- San Beda College Alabang
- Southville International School

== Competition ==
Team placing

- Winner
- Runner-up
- Third place

The cheerleading competition is divided into two divisions: the college division, and the High School division.

=== College ===
Team	Basic elements	Tumbling	Stunts	Tosses/Pyramids	Deductions	Total score	Result
UP Pep Squad	65.5	62.5	62	72	0	262	Champion
CCP Bobcats	61	60	58.5	73	0	252.5	Runner-up
Perpetual Help College	66	66	54	72	-10	248	Third place
Adamson Falcons	67.5	67	41	72.5	-20	228	Fourth place
Mapua Cardinals	43	34	44.5	68	0	189.5	Fifth place

=== High school ===
Team	Basic elements	Tumbling	Stunts	Tosses/Pyramids	Deductions	Total score	Result
Poveda Hardcourt	65.5	60	61	70.5	0	257	Champion
SHS Pep Squad	64.5	51	60	66.5	-10	232	Runner-up
School of Saint Anthony	62.5	46	57.5	65	0	231	Third place
San Beda College Alabang	52	42.5	51	61.5	0	207	Fourth place
Southville International School	44	31.5	42.5	59	-5	177	Fifth place
