= National Cheerleading Championship =

Philippine cheerleading competition

- Sport: Cheerleading
- Founded: 2006
- Founder: Carlos Valdes III and Emiliano Caruncho IV
- Director: Paula Isabel de la Llana–Nunag
- President: Carlos Valdes
- Motto: Leap Higher. Dance Harder. Cheer Louder. You've Got Spirit
- Country: Philippines
- Venues: Mall of Asia Arena (for Championships); PhilSports Arena (2007, 2012-2013 Championships); Ynares Sports Arena (2008-2011 Championships); Araneta Coliseum (2006 Championship); Various locations (for Regional Qualifiers)
- Most recent champions: National University (Ultimate); Far Eastern University (College): National University (High School)
- Most titles: National University (1 Elite Championship); University of the Philippines (1 College Championship); University of Santo Tomas (1 College All-Girl Championship); Adamson University (280) (1 High School Championships); Central Colleges of the Philippines (5 High School Championships); St. Paul College (4 Junior All-Girl Championships)
- Broadcaster: TBD
- Related competitions: UAAP Cheerdance Competition; NCAA Cheerleading Competition
- Website: www.nccphilippines.com.ph

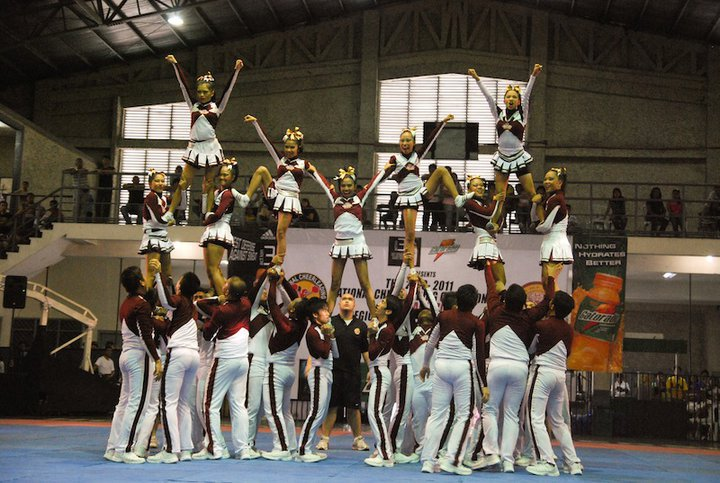
Cheerleaders competing at NCC. (Tarlac State University)

The National Cheerleading Championship, commonly known as NCC, is the Philippines’ first and oldest National cheerleading competition. The annual competition, which started in 2006, is modeled after U.S. competitive cheerleading competitions.

NCC is a member of the Cheer Pilipinas (CP), the official governing body for cheerleading in the Philippines. CP is the official sanctioned national federation recognized by the International Cheer Union (ICU), the world governing body for the sport of cheerleading.

== Background ==
=== History ===
National Cheerleading Championship started as a one-day invitational cheerleading championship in 2006. It started with two divisions, College and High School divisions, composed of ten teams and, was held in Araneta Coliseum. The inaugural event was judged by invited American judges, such as Joe Jackson of the Cheerleaders of America (COA), as well with known Filipino names in Philippine cheerleading.

In 2008, twenty nine teams from all over the country participated in the competition securing its title as the only national cheerleading competition in the Philippines.

By 2009, it first held regional qualifiers among three key cities in the Philippines. By 2010, with eighty five squads joining the qualifiers, the regional qualifiers was expanded to six; divisions were also expanded to six. In 2011, the divisions were expanded more to eight, and the National Dance Championship was inaugurated with 23 teams participating.

In 2018, the NCC saw more than 200 teams participate in the Nationals and also in 2018 NCC Philippines now allows international teams competing from China for the first time.

=== Mission ===
The National Cheerleading Championship's mission are:

1. To promote the sport of International Competitive cheerleading as a means to raise the caliber of local cheerleading
2. To promote the ideas of good sportsmanship, personal integrity and accountability, team cooperation and community activities
3. To develop cheerleaders that possess world-class cheerleading skills and abilities
4. To develop cheerleading coaches adept and knowledgeable in world class training methods and expertise
5. To standardize and inculcate the rules and regulations of competitive cheerleading and develop world-class and international quality training methods and skills
6. To establish the National Cheerleading Organization to provide products and services and a means for networking for the cheerleading community
7. To hold annually the country’s Premiere Cheerleading Tournament as a means to showcase the country’s cheerleading skills and talents
8. To be able to send a Filipino contingent to international cheerleading competitions.

=== Vision ===
The National Cheerleading Championship's vision is to become the premier organization for the advancement of cheerleading as a sport through developing and training world-class Filipino cheerleading athletes by providing international-standard training methods, services, and facilities, and a venue for a national cheerleading tournament.

== The divisions throughout the seasons ==
=== Cheerleading ===
The inaugural event started in 2006 at Araneta Coliseum with 10 participating teams (5 College and 5 High School Teams) and as of the 2018 Season, more than 10 division competitions has been established and the poms competition will soon be added as new division for Cheer competitions.

Since 2018, most teams who compete are from well-known schools (especially College Level 6 Divisions) have at-least tried to compete at the National Finals. The NCC Cheerleading Competition held every mid-to-late March, since some schools are off-season, some schools can't compete at the National Finals due to conflicting schedules (such as schools competing at NCAA Cheerleading Competition), as well as a short time for teams to prepare for ICU Worlds in April (in case of National University in 2015 ICU worlds but managed to compete at NCC Finals and ICU World Finals that year.)

Today, before you can enter and compete at NCC Finals, the team must Qualify through NCC Regional Qualifiers in different areas of the country depending on the location and proximity of the competing team/school. For example: Teams that are based in NCR must compete first in NCC NCR Qualifiers (except Open Coed/All-Girl Elite Divisions) before going to compete at National Finals.

Here are the list of Regional Qualifiers for NCC National Finals as of 2018-2019 Season:

NCC Regional Finals
	Regional Finals	Date	Location
Luzon	NCR	late-January/late-February	SM Mall of Asia, Music Hall / Market-Market Activity Center (2019)
Luzon	North Luzon	early-August	Baguio Convention Center, Baguio
Luzon	Central Luzon	mid-October	SM Clark, Pampanga
Luzon	South Luzon	mid to late October	Robinson's Las Pinas
Luzon	Bicol	late-October	ICR Arena, Legazpi
Visayas	Cebu	mid-November	SM Seaside, Cebu
Mindanao	Davao	early-January	Rizal Memorial Colleges

Here are the list of winners in each seasons since inaugural year in 2006, noted as more teams competed starting 2006 and broaden the competition in 2019. Poms division started in Season 13 (2017) and more divisions will be added soon as cheerleading is being developed in the Philippines.

Season		Division	Cheer Level	Champion (Score)	Runner-up (Score)	Third place (Score)	Teams
College	6	Central Colleges of the Philippines (324)	University of Perpetual Help (318)	National University (315.5)	19		
High School	5	Immaculate Conception Academy (294)	Saravia National High School (285)	Lanao del Norte NCHS (284)	14		
College All-Girls	6	De La Salle University (253)	De La Salle-College of Saint Benilde (231)	No other teams competed	2		
High School All-Girls	5	School of the Holy Spirit (282.5)	St. Paul College Pasig (251)	St. Pedro Poveda College (249)	8		
Junior All-Girls	4	School of the Holy Spirit (267.5)	St. Pedro Poveda College (243)	St. Paul College Pasig (175)	3		
Peewee All-Girls	3	Lamba Central Elementary School (198)	No other teams competed		1		
2015	10	Elite	5	Marist Elite All Star (404.3)	Altas Battalion Royale (378.5)	UE Pep Squad (360.5)	11
2015	10	College	6	National University (342)	University of Perpetual Help (323)	Central Colleges of the Philippines (302.5)	13
2015	10	High School	5	Parañaque National High School (297)	Las Pinas East National High School (289)	Immaculate Conception Academy (274)	13
2015	10	College All-Girls	6	De La Salle-College of Saint Benilde (287)	University of Santo Tomas (277.5)	De La Salle University (228.5)	3
2015	10	High School All-Girls	5	School of the Holy Spirit (280)	Immaculate Conception Academy (267)	St. Paul College Pasig (261)	9
2015	10	Junior All-Girls	4	St. Pedro Poveda College (262)	St. Paul College Pasig (250.5)	St. Mary's College of Meycauayan (240.5)	4
2016	11	Elite	5	Central Colleges of the Philippines (241.5)	NDDU-IBED Marist Premier All Stars (227)	South Empire All-Stars (220.5)	7
2016	11	College	6	National University (340.5)	University of Perpetual Help (317.5)	Far Eastern University (301.5)	16
2016	11	High School	5	Immaculate Conception Academy (314)	Lanao del Norte NCHS (276)	Parañaque National High School (274)	14
2016	11	College All-Girls	6	University of Santo Tomas (305)	De La Salle University (296.5)	De La Salle-College of Saint Benilde (276)	3
2016	11	High School All-Girls	5	St. Paul College Pasig (307)	School of the Holy Spirit (302.5)	Immaculate Conception Academy (294.5)	10
2016	11	Junior All-Girls	4	St. Pedro Poveda College (220.5)	St. Paul College Pasig (194.5)	Antonio Regidor Elementary School (185.5)	7
2016	11	Peewee All-Girls	3	School of Saint Anthony (106)	No other teams competed		1
2017	12	Elite	5	Far Eastern University	Central Colleges of the Philippines	Brent International School	
2017	12	College	6	National University	Far Eastern University	Taguig City University	
2017	12	High School	5	Ateneo de Manila University	University of Santo Tomas	University of Santo Tomas	
2017	12	College All-Girls	6	De La Salle University Paranaque city	Enderun College Taguig	St Paul College Pasig	
2017	12	High School All-Girls	5	St. Paul College Pasig	School of the Holy Spirit	De La Salle University	Brent International School
2017	12	Junior All-Girls	4	Polytechnic University of the Philippines	Lycevm of the Philippines University	Feati University	
2017	12	Peewee All-Girls	3	Our Lady of Fatima University	De La Salle University	Polytechnic University of the Philippines	
2018	13	Senior Coed Elite	5	Lanao Del Norte National High School - Wildcats	Immaculate Conception Academy	University of the East	
2018	13	Senior Coed Elite All-Girl	5	National University (375.75)	De La Salle University	St. Paul College Pasig	
2018	13	Open Coed Elite	5	Ateneo de Manila University East Wood (375.75)	Ateneo de Manila University, East Wood city	University of the Philippines Quezon city	
2018	13	Open All-Girl Elite	5	National University (375.75)	De La Salle University	University of the East	
2018	13	College Cheer	6	National University (88.88%)	Taguig City University	Central Colleges of the Philippines	
2018	13	College All-Girls	6	University of Santo Tomas (390.00)	University of the East	Central Colleges of the Philippines	
2018	13	High School All-Girls	5	St. Paul College Pasig	School of the Holy Spirit	Central Colleges of the Philippines	
2018	13	Junior All-Girls	4	University of the East	Central Colleges of the Philippines	Our Lady of Fatima University	
Peewee All-Girls	3						
2019	14	To be determined					

=== Poms Division ===
In Season 13 (2017) edition started the Poms Division and further expanded in 2018.

=== Stunts ===
Partner Stunts division opened in 2010, while the Group Stunts division started the following year and both division since 2012.

Season		Division	Champion (Score)	Runner-up (Score)	Third place (Score)	Teams
2014	9	Partner Stunts	Central Colleges of the Philippines (233)	Taguig City University (226.5)	Rizal Technological University (134)	3
2014	9	Group Stunts Coed	Taguig City University 1 (258)	National University (235)	Central Colleges of the Philippines 2 (218.5)	7
2014	9	Group Stunts All-Girls	Immaculate Conception Academy (207)	No other teams competed		1
2015	10	Partner Stunts	Taguig City University - Gold (248.5)	University of Perpetual Help (226)	Rizal Technological University (212.5)	5
2015	10	Group Stunts Coed	National University (248)	University of Perpetual Help - Gold (229)	CCP Bobcats Bagitos (227.5)	13
2015	10	Group Stunts All-Girls	National University (259)	De La Salle-College of Saint Benilde - Black (228)	Ateneo de Manila University (212)	8
2016	11	Partner Stunts	Taguig City University - Black (234)	Taguig City University All Stars (208.5)	City University of Pasay (199.5)	3
2016	11	Group Stunts Coed	Taguig City University - Red (247)	National University - Gold (218)	CCP Tander Cats (198.5)	8
2016	11	Group Stunts All-Girls	National University - Gold (235.5)	National University - Blue (210)	De La Salle-College of Saint Benilde - Black (204)	8
2017	12	Partner Stunts				
2017	12	Group Stunts Coed				
2017	12	Group Stunts All-Girls				
2018	13	Partner Stunts				
2018	13	Group Stunts Coed				
2018	13	Group Stunts All-Girls				
2019	14	Partner Stunts				
2019	14	Group Stunts Coed				
2019	14	Group Stunts All-Girls				

=== Dance ===
Inaugurated the competition since 2010-2011 Season.

Season	Division	Champion (Score)	Runner-up (Score)	Third place (Score)	Teams	
2014	College Hip Hop	Notre Dame of Dadiangas University (421.1)	University of the East (394.5)	Taguig City University (383.9)	7	
2014	High School Hip Hop	Colegio San Agustin – Makati (433)	La Salle Green Hills (430.5)	School of Saint Anthony (399.5)	5	
2014	College Hip Hop All-Girls	Lyceum of the Philippines University-Laguna (399.5)	Notre Dame of Dadiangas University (356)	No other teams competed	2	
2014	High School Hip Hop All-Girls	Miriam College High School (441.2)	Assumption College (440)	School of the Holy Spirit (428.4)	9	
2014	High School Jazz All-Girls	Assumption College (395.5)	St. Paul College Pasig (389)	Southernside Montessori School (362.5)	3	
2014	Junior Jazz All-Girls	St. Paul College Pasig (362)	No other teams competed			
2015	College Hip Hop	Notre Dame of Dadiangas University (398)	University of Santo Tomas (388.5)	Saint Louis University (370.5)	9	
2015	High School Hip Hop	La Salle Green Hills (450)	Xavier School (403.5)	Colegio San Agustin – Makati (378.5)	9	
2015	College Hip Hop All-Girls	Assumption College (385)	Saint Louis University (342)	Lyceum of the Philippines University-Laguna (335.5)	6	
2015	High School Hip Hop All-Girls	School of the Holy Spirit (413)	Miriam College High School (410)	Assumption College (406)	6	
2015	College Jazz All-Girls	Saint Louis University (238)	Colegio de San Juan de Letran (201)	No other teams competed	2	
2015	High School Jazz All-Girls	Assumption College (265.5)	Miriam College High School (257.5)	No other teams competed	2	
2015	Junior Jazz All-Girls	St. Paul College Pasig (234.5)	No other teams competed			
2016	College Hip Hop	Lyceum of the Philippines University-Laguna (358)	Cavite State University (356.5)	Notre Dame of Dadiangas University (351)	9	
2016	High School Hip Hop	La Salle Green Hills (369)	Fort Bonifacio High School (346)	De La Salle Zobel (336.5)	9	
2016	College Hip Hop All-Girls	Lyceum of the Philippines University-Laguna (359)	Assumption College (337.5)	Alab Danse Troupe (331)	4	
2016	High School Hip Hop All-Girls	St. Pedro Poveda College (367)	Assumption College (361.5)	Miriam College High School (334.5)	5	
2016	High School Jazz All-Girls	Miriam College High School (251.5)	St. Paul College Pasig (251)	Assumption College (248.5)	5	
2016	Junior Jazz All-Girls	St. Paul College Pasig (228)	Naga Central School II (206.5)	Naga City Himnastica (201.5)	4	
2017						
2018						
2019	To be determined					
2020	To be determined					
2021	College Hip Hop	Far Eastern University Cheering Squad (321)	High School Hip Hop	University of Santo Tomas (380)	Junior Jazz All-Girls	U.S.T. Salinggawi Dance Troupe (350)
2022	College Hip Hop	National University (397)	High School Hip Hop	Far Eastern University (360)	Junior Jazz All-Girls	Arellano University
2023	College Hip Hop	University of Santo Tomas	High School Hip Hop	University of Santo Tomas	Junior Jazz All-Girls	U.S.T. Salinggawi Dance Troupe
2024	College Hip Hop	National University	High School Hip Hop	Far Eastern University	Junior Jazz All-Girls	U.S.T. Salinggawi Troupe
2025	College Hip Hop	National University	High School Hip Hop	National University	Junior Jazz All-Girls	Far Eastern University
