= Cheer Pilipinas =

National sports association in the Philippines

- Sport: Cheerleading
- Jurisdiction: Philippines
- Abbreviation: CP
- Affiliation: International Cheer Union
- Affiliation date: 2009
- (Philippines)

Cheer Pilipinas (CP) is the national sports association for cheerleading in the Philippines which is a member of the International Cheer Union (ICU).

== History ==
The Cheer Pilipinas (CP), was formerly known as the Philippine Cheerleading Alliance (PCA). The PCA was established by the National Cheerleading Championship (NCC). The NCC itself was established in 2006.

The PCA was granted membership in the International Cheer Union (ICU) on September 15, 2009.

The other organization claiming jurisdiction over cheerleading in the Philippines is Cheerleading Philippines, which is affiliated with the International Federation of Cheerleading (ICF).

In May 2010, the PCA organized its first national cheerleading team. The Philippines debuted at the ICU World Cheerleading Championships in 2014 where they won a bronze at the all girls elite division.

== National teams ==
CP organizes national cheerleading teams which represent the Philippines in international competition. This includes a girls' and a co-ed team. They compete as Team Pilipinas.

== Record ==
=== ICU World Cheerleading Championships ===
Year	Category	Results	Notes	Ref.
2014	All Girl Elite	3rd place, bronze medalist(s)		
2015	All Girl Elite	2nd place, silver medalist(s)	Represented by the NU Pep Squad	
2015	Coed Elite	3rd place, bronze medalist(s)	Represented by the NU Pep Squad	
2015	Team Cheer Hip Hop	3rd place, bronze medalist(s)	Represented by Miriam Sayawatha high school.	
2017	Team Hip Hop	3rd place, bronze medalist(s)		
