= Cheerleading Philippines =

National governing body of cheerleading and cheer dance in the Philippines

- Founded: 1993
- Type: National Federation
- Region served: Philippines

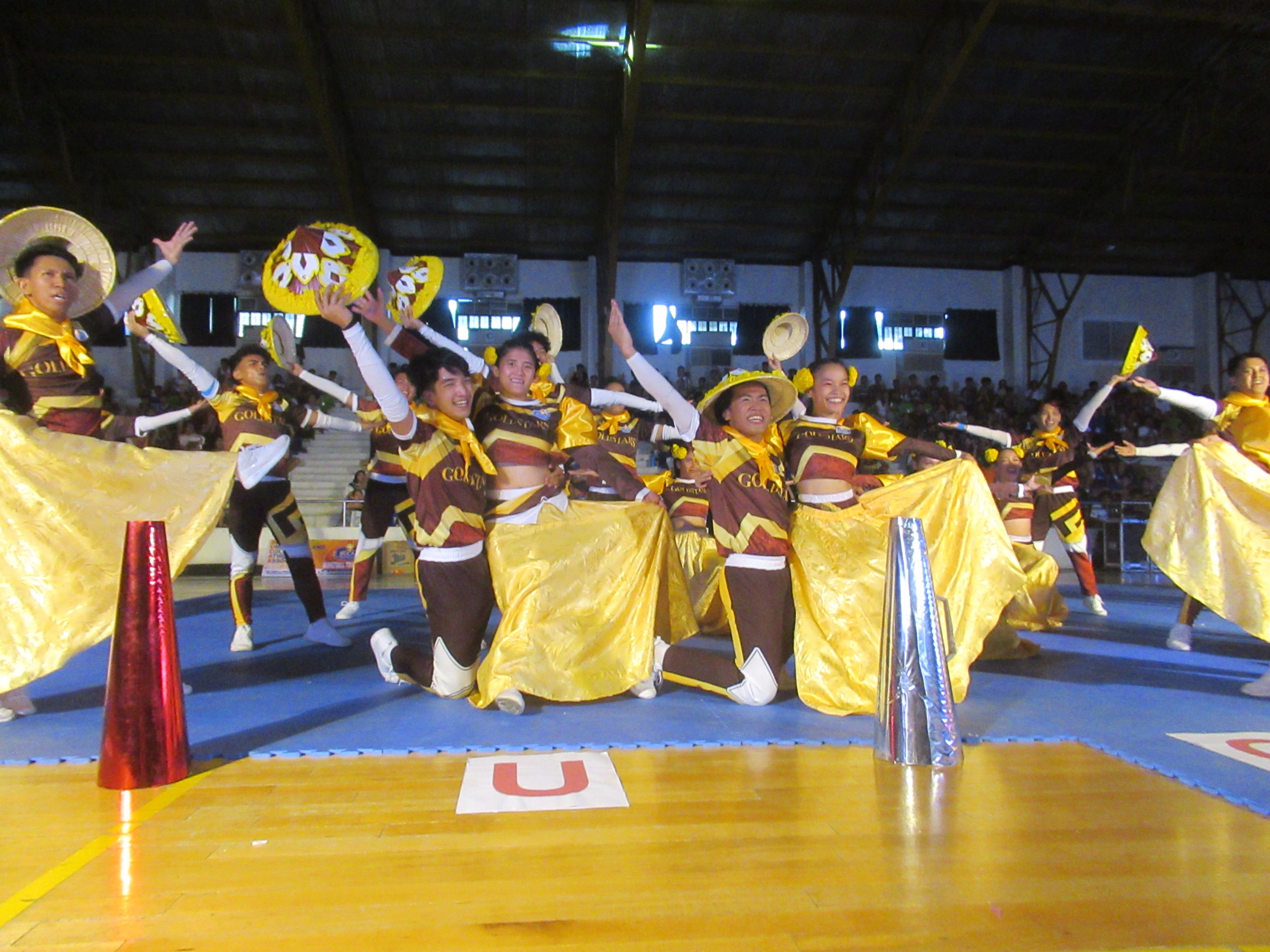
Cheerleaders cheering before a game. (Polytechnic University of the Philippines Santa Maria)

Cheerleading Philippines Federation (CPF) is the national confederation of Cheerleading organizations. It is the national governing body of Cheerleading and Cheer Dance in the country. Its primary activities are organized through standing Commissions that are each responsible for some aspect of cheerleading's development in the country. The CPF is mandated to sponsor and sanction cheerleading & cheer dance competitions and a variety of national and international cheerleading competitions, including the Cheerleading World Championships, the Asia Cup, the IFC World Cup. Its headquarters is located in Makati, Manila, Philippines.

The federation has coaches and judges education programs designed to upgrade to status and certification of qualified individuals as accredited coaches and judges.

== History ==
The CPF was formed in 1993 and was affiliated with the International Federation of Cheerleading (IFC) in 2007. By early 2008, the CPF represented 16 regional centers in key cities and provinces in the Philippines. It includes affiliate members who are nationals but residing outside the country including the first member societies representing the United States, Japan, Australia, and Canada. The CPF had grown to include 49 national cheerleading chapters, representing 3 inhabited sub-regions (Luzon, Visayas and Mindanao) in the Philippines.

== Governance structure ==
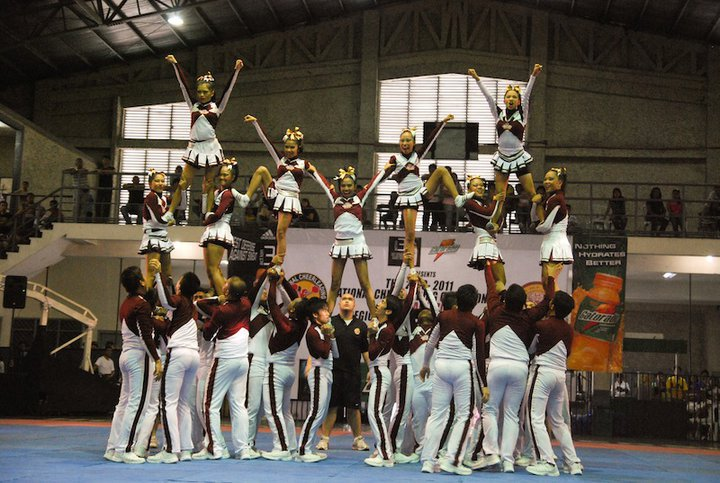
Cheerleaders at a competition event. (Tarlac State University)

The CPF has an appointed Country Manager and President, a Senior Vice-President, three Vice-Presidents, and other executive council members. Day-to-day operations of the CPF are the responsibility of the CPF Secretariat and Assistant to the Secretariat. Several standing commissions of the CPF are responsible for the development of cheerleading nationwide. These commissions include:

- Cheerleading Group Stunts
- Partner Stunts
- Coaches
- Judges
- Medical
- Competitions & Development
- Education
- Rules
- Mixed Group
- All Female
- Cheer Dance
- Junior Cheerleading

Sanctioned Leagues :

- NCAA - UAAP - WNCAA - WCSA - GALS - NAASCU

== Publications ==
The CPF has a wide variety of journals and reference works related to cheerleading. These include Cheerleading World, an annual magazine, The Journal of Cheerleading, the CPF Newsletter, and official editions of the rules of IFC-sanctioned cheerleading and specifications for cheerleading materials.

== See also ==
- Cheer Pilipinas, the International Cheer Union affiliate
