= Lanao del Norte National Comprehensive High School =

- Mataas na Paaralang Kumprehensibo ng Lanao del Norte

Location
- Nat'l Highway, Sto. Nino Village; Baroy, Lanao del Norte; Philippines
- 8°01′11″N 123°46′58″E

Information
- Former name: Lanao del Norte Provincial High School
- Type: Public, Secondary
- Established: June 21, 1969
- Principal: Letecia H. Lagura, Principal II
- Enrollment: <3500
- Campus: urban
- Nickname: LNNCHS, Baroy
- Affiliations: DepEd, DOST-ESEP

Lanao del Norte National Comprehensive High School (LNNCHS) is a public school located in Santo Nino Village, Baroy, Lanao del Norte, Philippines.

== History ==
The institution was formerly called as Lanao del Norte Provincial High School. It is the mother of former barangay high schools in the province. By virtue of Republic Act No. 5509, approved on June 21, 1969, LNPHS was converted into a national comprehensive high school. At present, it accommodates students from different municipalities of the province offering basic and science curriculum.

Its Department of Education ID is 304005.

== Programs ==
The school has four curricula: Science Technology Engineering and Mathematics (STEM), Basic Education Curriculum (BEC), Open High School and Special Program for Sports (SPS).

STEM is a program designed for students with above-average science and technology performance. Unlike BEC, it offers not just introductory but also advance sciences and even research. Analytical geometry and calculus are also introduced. Though operated by the Department of Education, the program is also supported by the Department of Science and Technology. Facilities were funded by DOST - Engineering and Science Education Program. An entrance examination must be passed to enroll in the program.

Open high school is designed for students hindered by certain reasons to attend school every day. The school provides modules for students to study at home and meet only on Saturday and Sunday.

Special Program for Sports (SPS) is for the athlete students which focuses on sports.

== Students ==
Most of the students in the school are under the BEC. Only the top 90 entrance examinees are allowed to enroll in STEM. Qualification will not be based on the grades' overall average but only on average of Sciences, Mathematics and English grades.

The graduation ceremonies are held in Mindanao Civic Center(MCC) Gymnasium with two proclaimed valedictorians. One for each programs.

== The campus ==
When Lanao del Norte was still part of the Region 10, LNNCHS used to be the venue for Regional Athletic Meets held at its sports complex: with a standard-size oval for football, baseball and softball; two volleyball courts; basketball court; and a small-sized gym for indoor sports.

After its inclusion to Northern Mindanao, regional athletic meets were seldom held in the campus. Region 10 chose MCC as the new venue. But still, almost half of the sports events are held at LNNCHS.

The school has a good student-campus ratio, with an enrollment of fewer than 3,500 students on a roughly 8-hectare campus.
