= Central Colleges of the Philippines =

Private college in Quezon City, Philippines

- Sentral Kolehiyo ng Pilipinas (Filipino)
- Former names: Polytechnic Colleges of the Philippines, Inc. (1954–1969)
- Type: Private non-sectarian higher education institution
- Established: January 18, 1954; 72 years ago
- Academic affiliations: PACUCOA
- Officer in charge: Salvador San Juan
- Chairman: Dr. Jose F. Oreta, Jr.
- President: Crispino Federico "Eric" S. Reyes, III
- Vice-president: Dr. Elena S. Reyes, DBA
- Registrar: Reinerio Z. Quinto, Jr., MBA
- Location: Hermenegildo R. Reyes (Main) Campus: No. 52 Aurora Boulevard near corner G. Araneta Avenue, Brgy. Dona Imelda, New Manila, Quezon City; Consorcia P. Reyes (Extension) Campus: No. 75 Aurora Blvd., Brgy. Dona Imelda, New Manila, Quezon City; 14°36′21″N 121°01′12″E
- Campus: Urban
- Colors: Crimson and gold
- Nickname: Bobcats
- Sporting affiliations: Colleges and Universities Sports Association
- Mascot: Lundvél Bob
- Website: www.ccp.edu.ph
- Location in Metro Manila Location in Luzon Location in the Philippines

The Central Colleges of the Philippines, Inc. (Filipino: Sentral Kolehiyo ng Pilipinas), also referred to by its acronym CCP, is a private, nonsectarian coeducational higher education institution located in Quezon City, Metro Manila, Philippines. CCP was established on January 18, 1954, as the Polytechnic Colleges of the Philippines, Inc. (PCP), with an enrollment of 300 students.

== History ==
Central Colleges of the Philippines started its operations upon its establishment on January 18, 1954, with an enrollment of 300 students. It was then known as the Polytechnic Colleges of the Philippines.

It was established by a group of prominent educators.
1.) Engr. Manuel Ignacio Felizardo; (Note: > Mechanical engineer by profession. > DPWH Secretary during the late President Ramon Magsaysay.)
2.) Engr. Vicente Y. Orosa; (Note: > Also known as "Inte". > Civil engineer by profession. > A civil engineering professor of FEU Institute of Technology and Mapua Institute of Technology. > Served as Secretary of DPWH from 1911 to 1957. Served under six former Philippine Presidents. > College founder Engr. Hermenegildo Roque Reyes, Sr. convinced and offered him College Presidency but declined. > One of his children is also Alumni of the College of Engineering. > Graduated in 1959 with the degree of B.S. Civil Engineering. > Master Mason of Freemason and Knight of Rizal Orders.)
3.) Engr. Ciriaco Ygnacio Coronel; (Note: > Electronics and communications engineer by profession.)
4.) Atty. Emilio M. Javier, J.D.; (Note: > Graduate of Silliman University with the degree of A.B. in 1915. > Admitted to Integrated Bar of the Philippines in July 1919. > Obtained his Sc.D. in Jurisprudence from University of Michigan in 1932. > Founding Dean of College of Law of Silliman University in 1935. > Past Vice-Presidential candidate during the 1941 Philippines general election. > Running mate for Presidential candidate Juan M. Sumulong Sr. during 2nd Philippine national election of the Commonwealth of the Philippines against re-electionist Manuel L. Quezon. > Running mate for Vice-Presidential candidate Sergio Osmena, but lost to Osmena. Landslide votes of 1,400,000 margin. > Founder and first College President (From 1952 to 1959) of Philippine Christian College.)
5.) Engr. Gonzalo T. Vales. (Note: > Civil engineer by profession. > Graduate of Bachelor of Arts in 1913 from Silliman University. > Awardee of outstanding Sillimanian Alumni. > Earned Bachelor of Science in Civil Engineering from University of Southern California in 1917. > Freemason member. > Her niece is Evelyn Armanda Vales, first Filipina graduate of A.B. in Architecture from USC in 1958. > Founding President of Philippine Society of Civil Engineers (now Philippine Institute of Civil Engineers, Inc.). > Co-founded and founding Dean and former Vice-President of Mapua Institute of Technology, Manila (From 1925 to 1953) with first Filipino registered Architect Tomas B. Mapua. > Co-founder and first College president (1954 to 1969), founding Dean of College of Engineering. > Married to late Rebecca S. Vales (was College registrar emeritus) with child Rachel S. Vales (was College alumni director emeritus).)

In school year 1956-1957, the High School Department was established.

In school year 1960-1961, the College of Arts and Sciences and the College of Business Administration were opened.

In 1969, Engr. Hermenegildo Roque Reyes, Sr (Note: > Also known as "Dean Reyes". > Civil engineer by profession. > Former Dean of the FEU Institute of Technology. > Son of Paulino Z. Reyes and Marcela S. Reyes. > His paternal grandparents were Numeriano Somo Reyes and Rosario Zuniga Reyes. > Past regent of UP Board of Regents in 1962. > Past President of University of the Philippines Alumni Association. > Founding president of UP Alumni Engineers from 1945 to 1947. > Past President of Upsilon Beta Phi Alumni. > Past President of Philippine Chamber of Commerce. > Founded H.R. Reyes Construction, Inc. > Graduate of University of the Philippines with the degree of Bachelor of Science in Civil Engineering in 1928.) was assigned as second College president and held his position until 1979 and Polytechnic Colleges of the Philippines was renamed to Central Colleges of the Philippines.

In January 1971, Dr. H.R. Reyes successfully bought out share of 20% of his co-founder Engineer Vales and other majority shareholders. He finally controlled ownerships.

In 1977, Secretarial Administration and Agricultural Business Management programs were offered.

In 1981, Optometry program was offered.

His eldest son, late Atty. Crispino P. Reyes, Sr. (Note: > Also known as "Babes". > Date of birth: January 27, 1938. > Date of death: June 14, 2025. > Was graduate of: Pre-law from University of the Philippines, Diliman in 1958; Bachelor of Laws (Ll.B.) from Ateneo de Manila University in 1962; and Master of Laws (Ll.M.) from University of Michigan in 1966. > Was admitted to Integrated Bar of the Philippines in 1964. > Was professor of: Ateneo Law School; FEU Institute of Law (From 1964 to 1974); and UP College of Law (From 1964 to 1991). > Was senior partner of his law firm Pacis and Reyes Attorneys (1978 to 2025). > Married to Elena Santos Reyes, DBA. > Has a grandson named Crispino Federico S. Reyes, III (Also known as "Eric") the Fourth College President. > Has a younger sibling named Hermenegildo P. Reyes, Jr. and grandson named Hermenegildo Carlos Reyes, III (Future college board of trustee). > Was Board Chairman emeritus of Ateneo Law Alumni Association, Inc. > Was Board Chairman Emeritus with the late Atty. Antonio C. Pacis (+). > Was President of Legis Forum, Inc. > Was active in Board meetings.) succeeded as third College President & Board Chairman (1980 to 2025).

On CCP's 50th founding anniversary (In school year 2004–2005), its Board of Trustees approved Board Resolution to rename Engineering Building to Engr. Gonzalo T. Vales Bldg.

In August 2025, the newly hired College Board of Trustee Chairman, Dr. Jose F. Oreta, Jr., takes a lead to new innovative way of running colleges, and with new partners with businessman Len Oreta. (Note: > Of A.M. Oreta & Co., Inc. > Father of Malabon Representative Antolin A. Oreta, III ("Lenlen").)

== Campuses ==
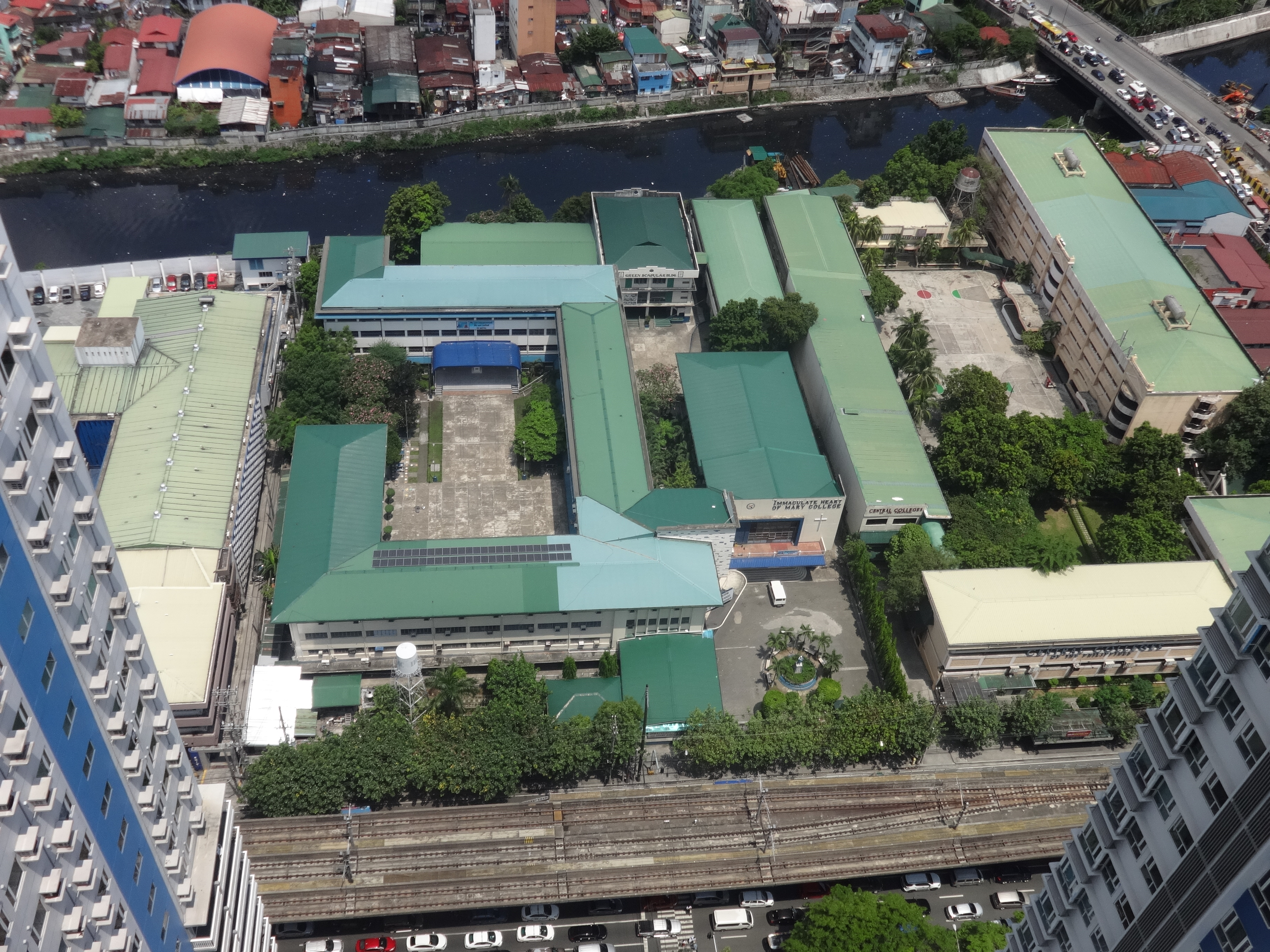
Aurora Boulevard Campus

CCP has two campuses: the Hermenegildo R. Reyes (Main) campus and the Consorcia P. Reyes (Extension) campus.

The H.R. campus houses the following.

- The Paulino Z. Reyes (PR) Bldg. was named after father of the college founder Hermenegildo Roque Reyes, Sr. and grandfather of the third college president. It houses the College of Arts and Sciences, College of Education, College of Accountancy, College of Business Administration, Admissions Office, Guidance and Counseling Office, Physical Education Department, typing classrooms, College's bookstore, Student Locker Custodian's Office, and Security Office.
- The Engr. Gonzalo T. Vales (GV) Bldg. (Also called Engineering Building) was named after first college president & co-founder of Mapua University and co-founder of the college. It houses the College of Engineering.
- The Dr. Hermenegildo R. Reyes, Sr. (HR) Hall (Also named as CCP Computer Science Hall) was named after the second college president and founder of college. It houses the College of Computer Studies, College of Architecture, DynEd (Note: What is DynEd?) laboratory room, CTC (Note: CTC: Computer Technology Center.) laboratory rooms, AutoCAD room, chemistry and physics laboratory, engineering drawing rooms, architecture drawing rooms, Computer Technical Support's Office, CCP President's Office, Cashier's Office, Accounting Office, and Studio Theater.
- The Sen./Engr. Gaudencio E. Antonino, Sr. (GA) Bldg. (First and oldest among the buildings) was named after college treasurer and husband of Sen. Magnolia R. Welborn-Antonino. It houses the main library, the Registrar's Office, and Office of the Alumni (CCPAAI).
- CyberPort. (Note: Location of first PCP engineering building. Demolished.) Its ground floor houses canteen area. Its second floor houses online resources center where the students can do their research and communicate with their friends for free.
- College's Chapel, for spiritual needs of the students and faculty.

The Extension Campus houses the Consorcia P. Reyes Hall, named after wife of the founder college and mother of the third college president. It also houses the High School Department, the College of Nursing, the gymnasium, and ELC (English Learning Center).

== Academics ==
=== Academic Programs ===
- Secondary Education
  - Junior High School
  - Senior High School
    - STEM (Science, Technology, Engineering, and Mathematics)
    - ABM (Accountancy, Business, and Management)
    - HUMSS (Humanities and Social Sciences)
- Tertiary Education
  - Undergraduate Studies
    - College of Engineering
      - BS Civil Engineering
      - BS Electrical Engineering
      - BS Mechanical Engineering
    - College of Architecture
      - BS Architecture
    - College of Computer Studies
      - BS Information Technology
      - Associate in Computer Technology
    - College of Business Administration
      - BS Business Administration, major in Marketing Management
    - College of Arts and Sciences
      - AB Psychology
    - College of Nursing
      - BS Nursing
    - College of Education
      - B Secondary Education major in English
      - Certificate in Teacher Education (Note: For College graduate of any field of discipline other than Elementary Education or Secondary Education.)
  - Graduate Studies
    - Graduate School
      - Master of Business Administration
      - Master of Public Administration

=== Accreditation ===
Central Colleges of the Philippines is accredited by the Commission on Higher Education (CHED), Philippine Association of Educators, and Philippine Association of Colleges and Universities Commission on Accreditation (PACUCOA Level 2 re-accreditation).

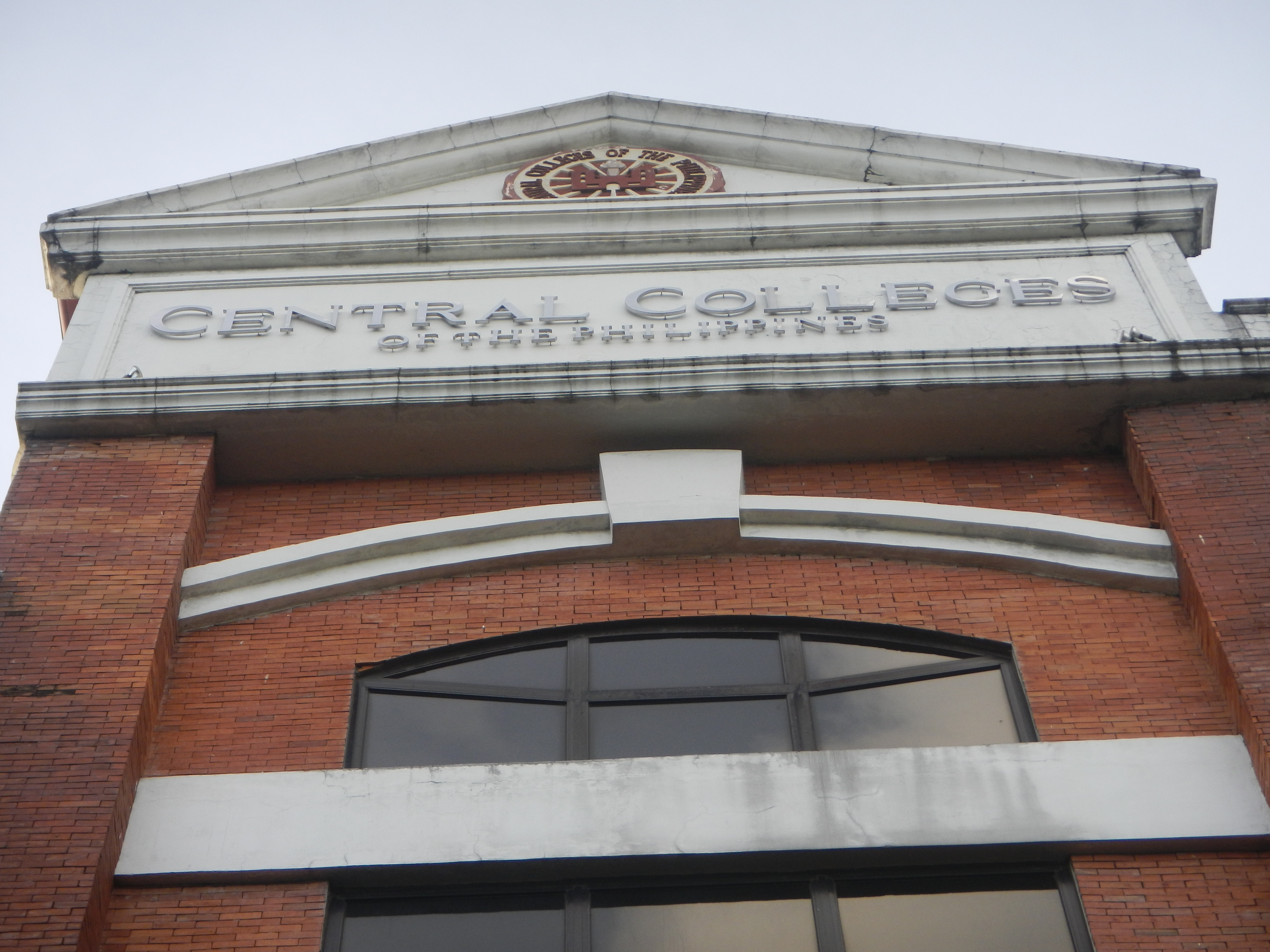
Facade in September 2016

=== Libraries ===
There are three libraries in CCP: the Main Library [Sen. Gaudencio E. Antonio, Sr. (GA) Hall], Graduate Studies Library [Sen. Gaudencio E. Antonio, Sr. (GA) Hall], and the Nursing Library (Consorcia P. Reyes Hall or the Extension Campus).

=== Topnotchers ===
Licensure Examination Topnotchers.

- 1st Place - 1996 Electrical Engineering Licensure Examination - Engr. Belino Dagalea
- 8th Place - 2013 Architecture Licensure Examination - Arch. Rosario Charito T. Dela Paz
- 10th Place - 2013 Electronics and Communications Engineering Licensure Examination - Engr. Alexander Macatual
- 5th Place - 2014 Education Licensure Examination - Ramon Cristobal
- 1st Place - 2014 Electronics and Communications Engineering Licensure Examination - Engr. Jann Ivan Asaula
- 5th Place - May 2017 Civil Engineering Licensure Examination - Engr. Robert Arago, Jr.

== Student life ==
=== Athletics ===
Athletics includes badminton, basketball, cheerleading, chess, karate, table tennis, and volleyball.

The men's volleyball team won the 2005-2006 CUSA Volleyball Championship. They defeated St. Jude College 3–1 in a best of 3 finals. CCP has won 6 championships (1997–1998, 1998–1999, 1999–2000, 2002–2003, and 2005–2006)

The CCP Bobcats Pep Squad won the National Cheerleading Championship (NCC) in 2007–2010, 2012–2016, and 2018. After which, they were replaced by N.U. Team.

CCP Karate Club works under the Shotokan Karate International Federation (SKIF). The Karate team has been associated with SKIF since 1994. In 1992, the Karate Club won their first Iwabuchi Cup. From 1993 to 1994, the Karate Club won consecutive championships of the Private Schools Athletic Association.
