= School of Saint Anthony =

Roman Catholic school in Quezon City, Philippines

School of Saint Anthony, Quezon City
- Paaralang San Antonio, Lungsod ng Quezon (Filipino)
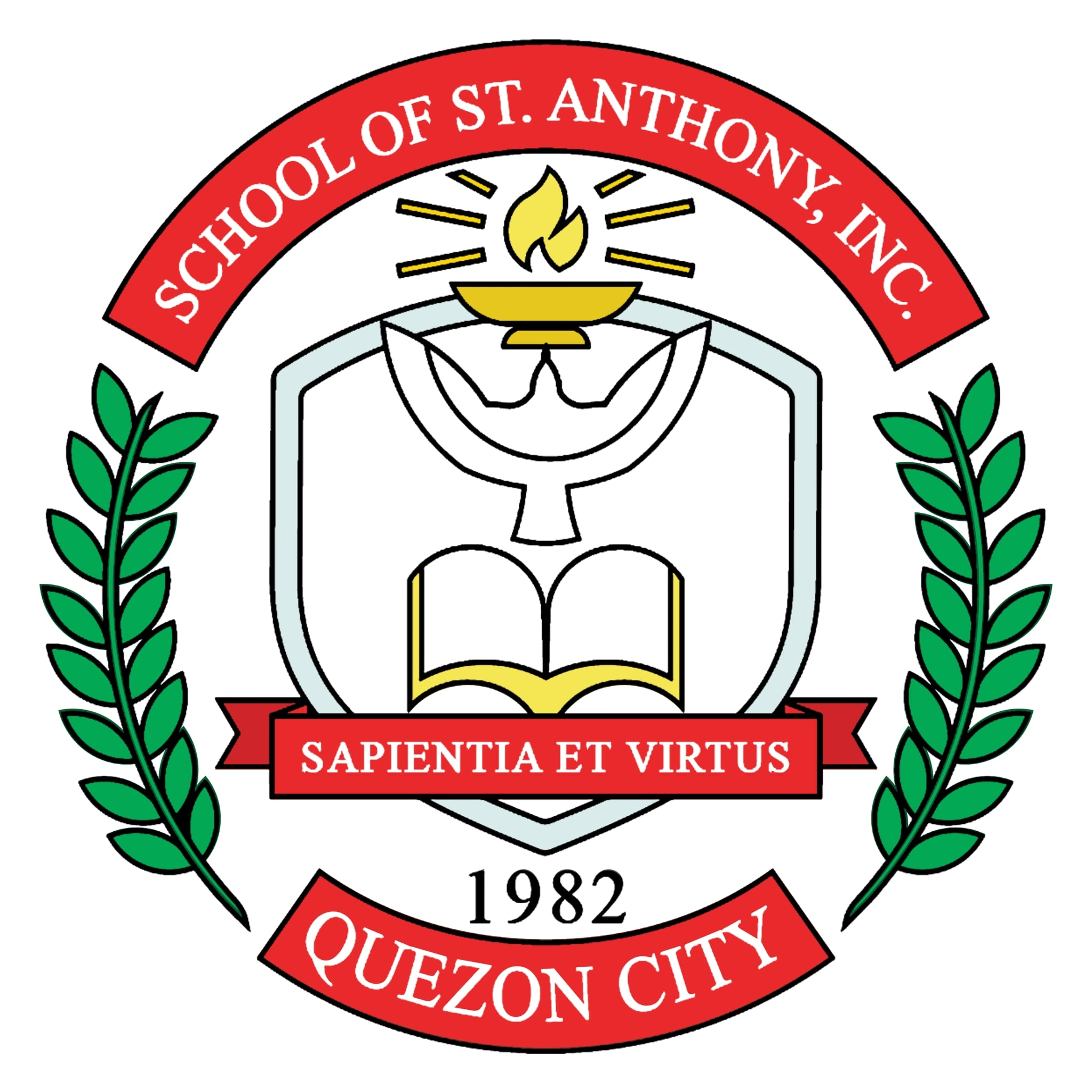

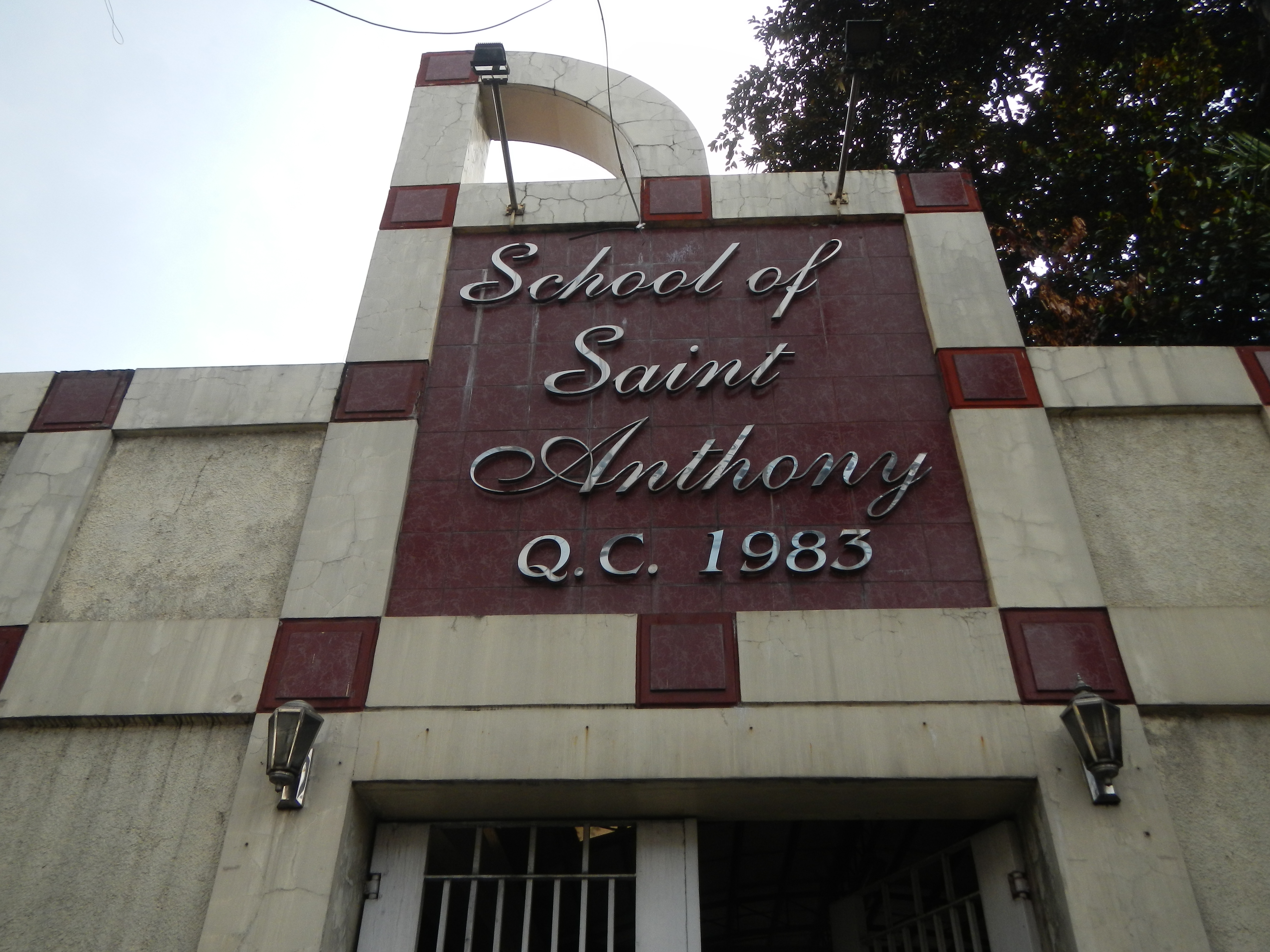

Location
- Ascencion Avenue, Lagro, Novaliches; Quezon City; Philippines
- 14°44′1.58″N 121°4′1.34″E

Information
- Type: Private Catholic school
- Motto: Sapientia et Virtus (Latin); Wisdom coupled with Virtues
- Established: 1982
- Principal: Amy Mamiit, MA Ed, institutional principal
- Enrollment: Approximately 2,800
- Colors: Red, black and white
- Mascot: Seagull
- Accreditation: PAASCU Level III
- Newspaper: Sapientia et Vitus / Ang Paglalayag Publications
- Yearbook: The Anthonian
- Affiliations: PAASCU, AAPS, QCAA, CEAP
- Magazine: The Leap
- School director: Dr. Enrique F. Coralejo
- Hymn: "Saint Anthony Hymn"
- Website: www.schoolofsaintanthony.edu.ph

School of Saint Anthony, Quezon City, also called SSA or School of Saint Anthony, was founded in 1982 as Saint Anthony Learning Center by spouses Enrique F. Coralejo and Victoria A. Coralejo. Its patron saint is St. Anthony Mary Claret, who founded the Congregation of Missionary Sons of the Immaculate Heart of Mary. It is located in Ascención Avenue, Lagro, Novaliches District, Quezon City, Philippines. The school is also located at the terminus of Mindanao Avenue.

== History ==
The school began its operations in June 1982. It initially offered Nursery, Kinder and Prep, and gradually expanded to Lower and Middle School, and later to the Upper School (High School). As the institution progressed in both size and population its name was changed from Saint Anthony Learning Center to its current name, School of Saint Anthony.

== Levels offered ==
As of 2015-2016

Preschool

- Nursery
- Kindergarten

Lower School

- Grades 1-3

Middle School

- Grades 4-6

Upper School

- Grades 7-10
- Grades 11-12 (senior high, launch: AY 2016–2017)

Senior High School strands

- Science, Technology, Engineering and Mathematics (STEM)
- Accounting, Business and Management (ABM)
- Humanities and Social Sciences (HUMSS)
- Information and Communications Technology (ICT)

== Notable alumni ==
- Van Ferro, Filipino-American actor
- Miles Ocampo, Filipina actress
- Angeli Tabaquero, Philippine volleyball team captain, 2013 Asian Championship

== Gallery ==
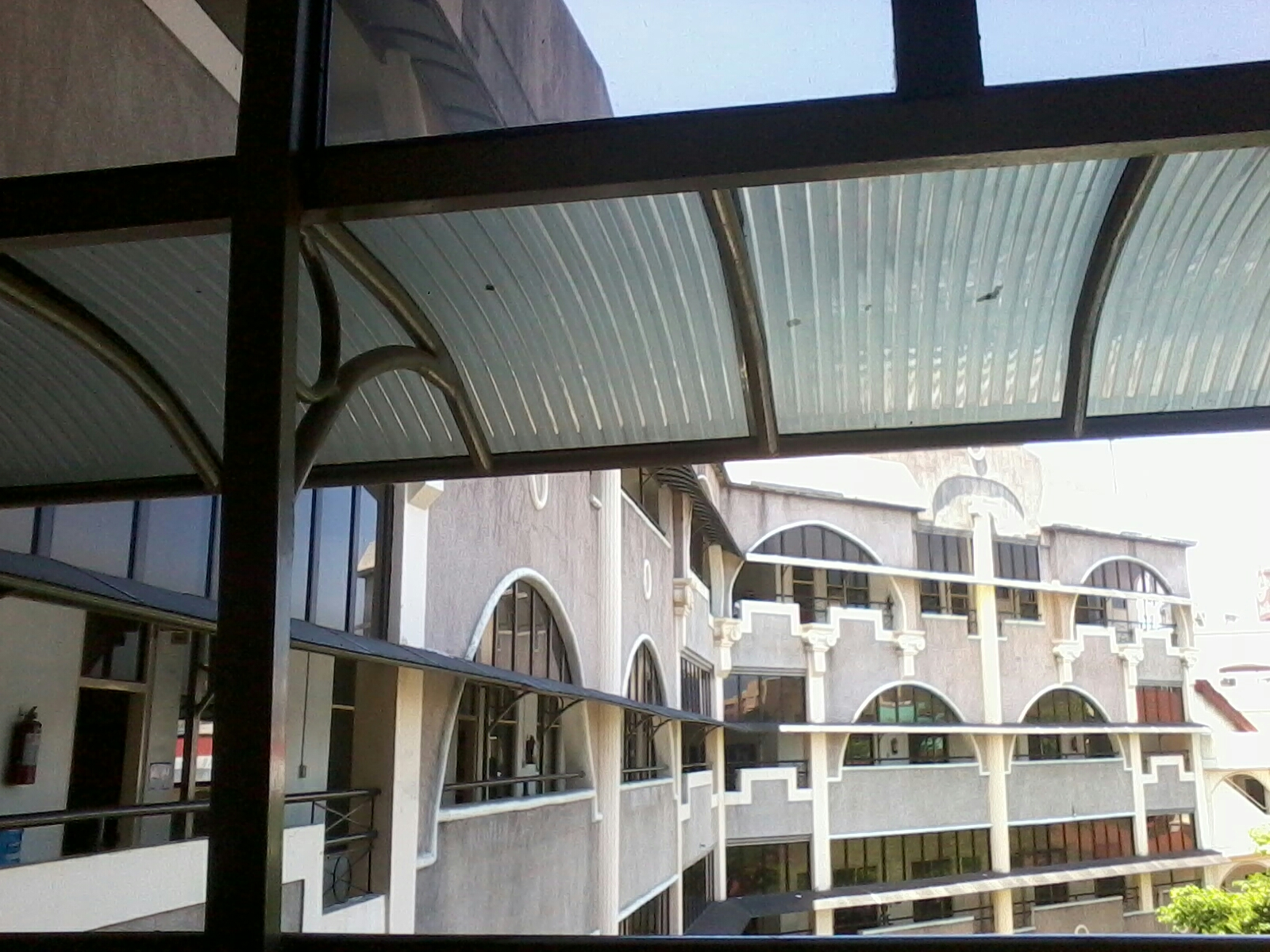
Upper School building
