= Education in the Philippines =

Department of Education (DepEd); Commission on Higher Education (CHED); Technical Education and Skills Development Authority (TESDA)
- Secretary of Education: Sonny Angara
- Chairperson of CHED: Shirley Agrupis
- Director-General of TESDA: Jose Francisco Benitez

National education budget (2023)
- Budget: ₱852.8 billion (DepEd + CHED + TESDA + SUCs)

General details
- Primary languages: Filipino; English
- System type: National

Literacy (2019)
- Total: 98.4%
- Male: 97.9%
- Female: 98.9%

Enrollment (2021–2022)
- Total: 27.56 million (public schools) + 1.44 million (private schools)
- Primary: 2.18 million (public kindergarten schools) + 12.79 million (public elementary schools)
- Secondary: 8.75 million (public junior high schools) + 3.82 million (public senior high schools)
- Post secondary: 5.6 million

Attainment (2010)
- Secondary diploma: 19.1%
- Post-secondary diploma: 12.8%^{1}
- ^{1} Figures include post-baccalaureate data.

Education in the Philippines is compulsory at the basic education level, composed of kindergarten, elementary school (grades 1–6), junior high school (grades 7–10), and senior high school (grades 11–12). The educational system is managed by three government agencies by level of education: the Department of Education (DepEd) for basic education; the Commission on Higher Education (CHED) for higher education; and the Technical Education and Skills Development Authority (TESDA) for technical and vocational education. Public education is funded by the national government.

Private schools are generally free to determine their curriculum in accordance with existing laws and regulations. Institutions of higher education are classified as public or private; public institutions are subdivided into state universities and colleges (SUCs) and local colleges and universities (LCUs).

Enrollment in basic education has increased steadily since the effectivity of the K-12 curriculum, first implemented on May 20, 2008, through its 9 years of implementation until June 5, 2017, on April 24, 2012, with over 28 million students enrolled in the 2022–2023 school year. In 2020, there were approximately 32 million learners aged 5 to 24 enrolled nationwide. An additional 640,000 out-of-school youth participated in the Alternative Learning System, while 1.6 million children aged 5 to 17 remained out of school as of 2023. Completion rates for primary and lower secondary education are relatively high, but drop-out rates and barriers to upper secondary and tertiary education remain, particularly among lower-income students.

== History ==
=== Pre-colonial period (900 AD to 1565) ===
As with most people of the world at this time period, learning by apprenticeship in tradeswork was the norm rather than education that heavily involved writing such as religious literature, scholarly work, and philosophy like those in Medieval Europe or in East Asia which was reserved for the elites, the ruling or priestly class. During the pre-colonial period, most children were provided solely vocational training, mainly supervised by parents, some tribal tutors or those assigned to specific, specialized roles within their communities (for example, the babaylan). In most communities, stories, songs, poetry, dances, medicinal practices and advice regarding all sorts of community life issues were passed from generation to generation, primarily through oral tradition. Some communities utilized a writing system known as baybayin, whose use was wide and varied, though other syllabaries were used throughout the archipelago. Inculcation of reverence for the god Bathala, obedience to authority, loyalty to the family or clan, and respect for truth and righteousness were the chief aims of education.

=== Spanish period (1863) ===
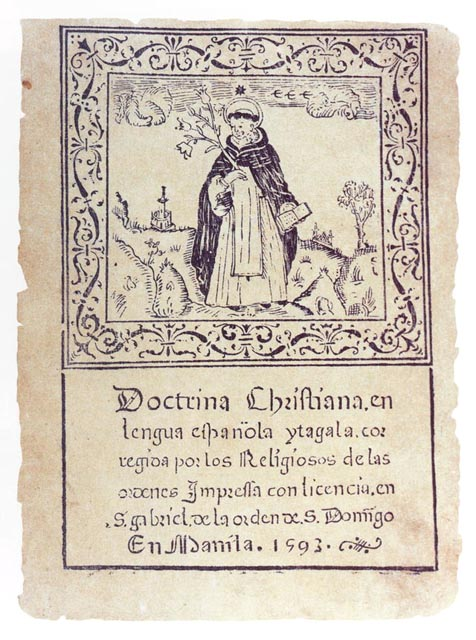
Cover of Doctrina Christiana

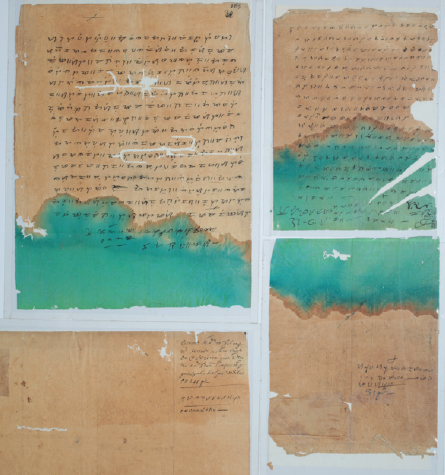
University of Santo Tomas Baybayin Documents

Formal education was brought to the Philippines by the Spanish, which was primarily conducted by religious orders. Upon learning the local languages and writing systems, they began teaching Christianity, the Spanish language, and Spanish culture. These religious orders opened the first schools and universities as early as the 16th century. Spanish missionaries established schools immediately after reaching the islands. The Augustinians opened a parochial school in Cebu in 1565. The Franciscans took to the task of improving literacy in 1577, aside from the teaching of new industrial and agricultural techniques. The Jesuits followed in 1581, and the Dominicans, in 1587, set up a school in Bataan. The church and the school cooperated to ensure that Christian villages had schools for students to attend.

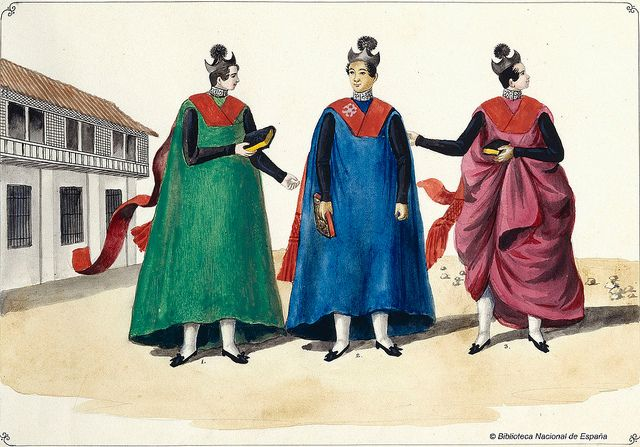
Colegiales de Manila 1847 depicting a student from Universidad de Santo Tomas(Green), Colegio de San Juan de Letran(Blue) and San Jose (Red).

Schools for boys and girls were then opened. Colegios were opened for boys, ostensibly the equivalent to present-day senior high schools. The Universidad de San Ignacio, founded in Manila by the Jesuits in 1589, was the first colegio. Eventually, it was incorporated into the University of Santo Tomas, College of Medicine and Pharmacology, following the suppression of the Jesuits. Girls had two types of schools – the Beaterio, a school meant to prepare them for the life at convent, and another, a Colegio, meant to prepare them for secular womanhood.

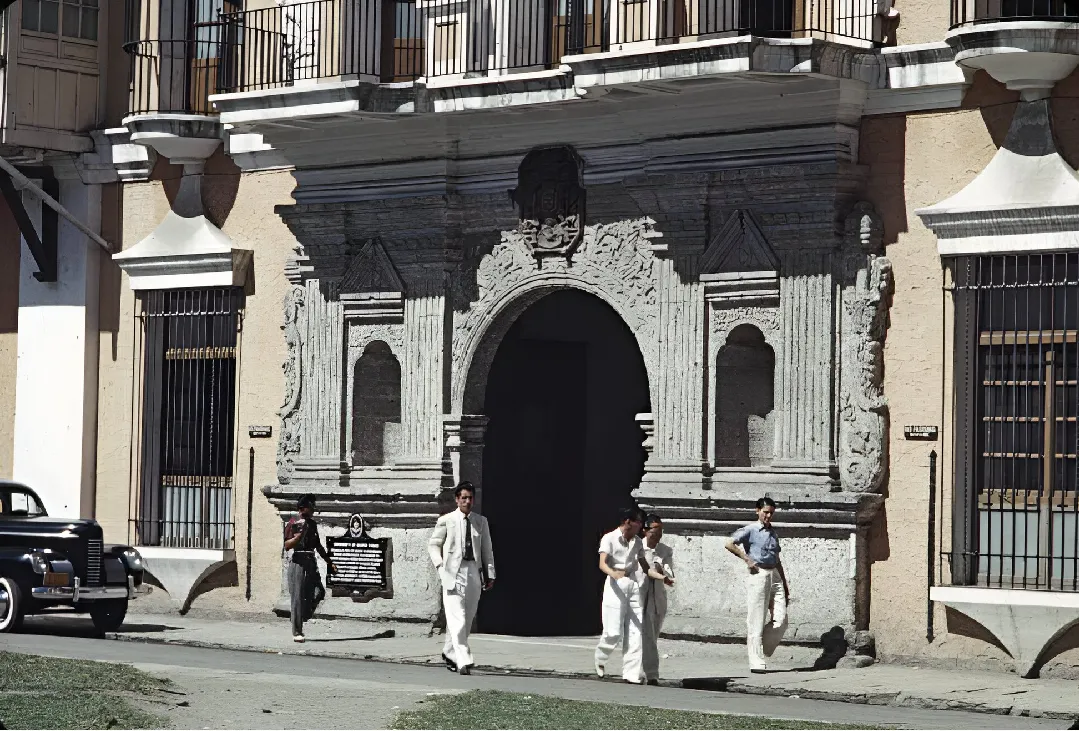
Universidad de Santo Tomas, Manila (Intramuros), the oldest university in Asia.Assembly hall Ateneo de Manila

The Spanish also introduced printing presses to produce books in Spanish and Tagalog, sometimes using Baybayin. The first book printed in the Philippines dates back to 1590. It was a Chinese language version of Doctrina Christiana. Spanish and Tagalog versions, in both Latin script and the locally used baybayin script, were later printed in 1593. In 1610, Tomás Pinpin, a Filipino printer, writer and publisher, sometimes called the "Patriarch of Filipino Printing", wrote his famous "Librong Pagaaralan nang manga Tagalog nang Uicang Castilla", which was meant to help Filipinos learn the Spanish language. The prologue read:

Let us therefore study, my countrymen, for although the art of learning is somewhat difficult, yet if we are persevering, we shall soon improve our knowledge. Other Tagalogs like us did not take a year to learn the Spanish language when using my book. This good result has given me satisfaction and encouraged me to print my work, so that all may derive some profit from it.

==== First Public Schools ====
The Spanish Educational Decree of 1863 provided a free public education system in the Philippines, managed by the government. The decree mandated the establishment of at least one primary school for boys and one for girls in each town under the municipal government's responsibility and the establishment of a regular school for male teachers under the supervision of the Jesuits. Primary education was also declared free and available to every Filipino, regardless of race or social class. Contrary to what the Spanish–American War propaganda tried to depict and current popular media, they were not religious schools; instead, they were schools established, supported, and maintained by the Spanish government.

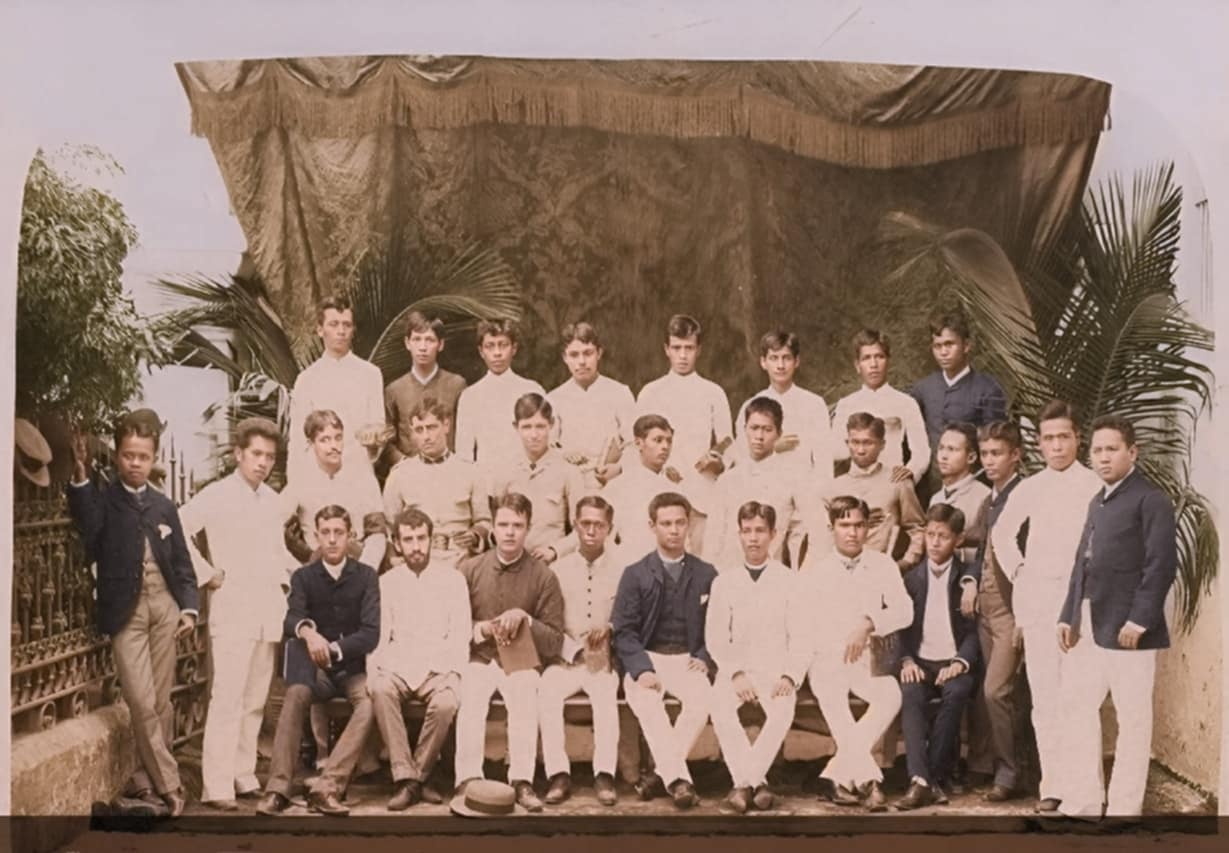
Groups of students in the colleges in Manila, Philippines 1887 - Santo Tomas, San Juan de Letran, San Jose and Santa Catalina.

After implementing the decree, the number of schools and students increased steadily. In 1866, the total population of the Philippines was 4,411,261. The total number of public schools for boys was 841, and the number of public schools for girls was 833. The total number of children attending those schools was 135,098 for boys and 95,260 for girls. In 1892, the number of schools had increased to 2,137, of which 1,087 were for boys and 1,050 for girls. By 1898, enrollment in schools at all levels exceeded 200,000 students. There was some opposition to universal education from Spanish priests; only 1.6% of the population gained more than primary school education.

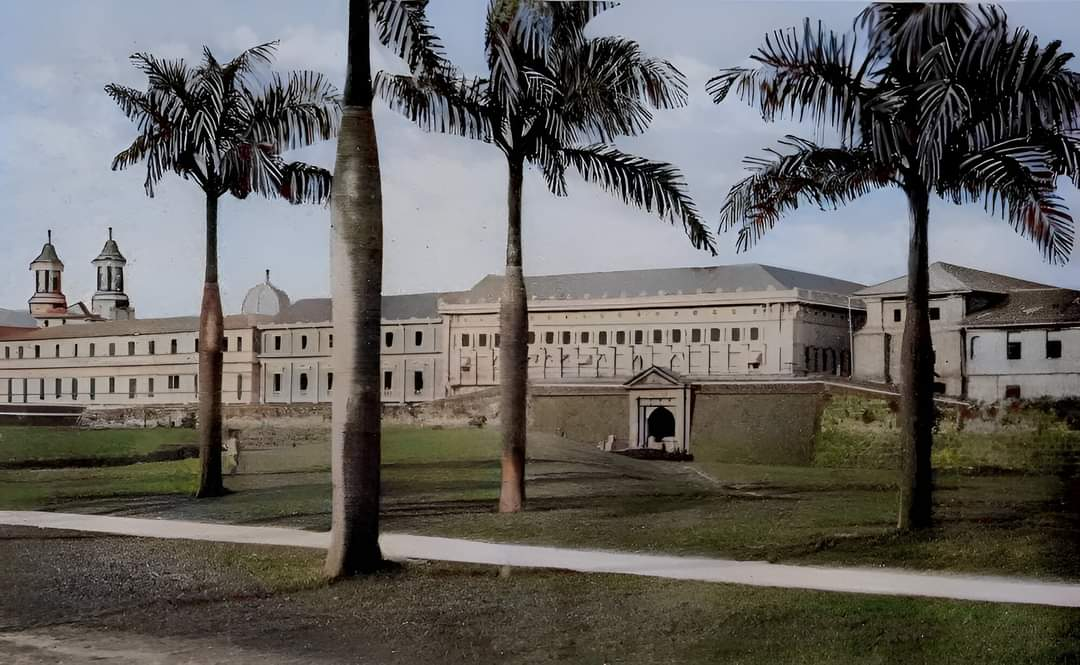
View of Ateneo inside the walled city of Manila(Intramuros).

Among those who benefited from the accessible public education system were a burgeoning group of Filipino intellectuals: the Ilustrados ('enlightened ones'), some of whom included José Rizal, Graciano López Jaena, Marcelo H. del Pilar, Mariano Ponce, and Antonio Luna—all of whom played vital roles in the Propaganda Movement that ultimately inspired the founding of the Katipunan.

Non-Spaniards founded some schools during this period that were not colonial creations. Damián Domingo established in 1823 a fine arts school known as the Academia de Dibujo y Pintura, now the Fine Arts College of the University of the Philippines. In 1868, Doña Margarita Róxas de Ayala established the girls' school La Concordia, once regarded as the best girls' school in the colony. Asunción Ventura, a nun, founded in 1885 an orphanage the Asilo de Looban in Paco, an arrabal of Manila. It was the first orphanage founded by a Filipino and it would later offer academic and vocational instruction.

=== First Republic ===
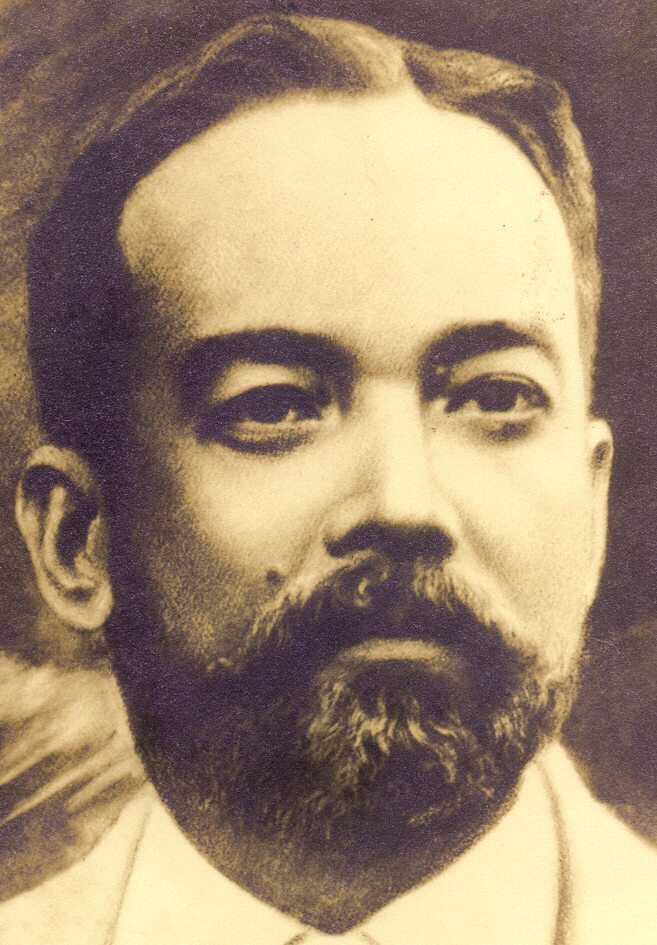
Dr Don Joaquín González, rector of Universidad Literaria y Cientifica de Filipinas of the 1st Philippine Republic

The defeat of Spain following the Spanish–American War led to the short-lived Philippine Independence movement, which established the First Philippine Republic. The schools maintained by Spain for over three centuries were closed briefly but reopened on August 29, 1898, by the Minister of the Interior. The Instituto Burgos (Burgos Institute), the Academia Militar (the country's first military academy), and the Universidad Literaria de Filipinas (Literary University of the Philippines) were established.

Article 23 of the Malolos Constitution mandated that public education would be free and obligatory in all schools of the nation under the First Republic. However, the Philippine–American War hindered its progress. Established in the American-occupied zone, Colegio Filipino (now National University) is a Philippine college that dates from this period and has survived. There also existed for many decades the Rosa Sevilla Memorial School, originally founded on July 15, 1900, as the Instituto de Mujeres, an all-girls private school. The most notable institute of higher learning of this period was the highly regarded and patriotic Liceo de Manila on Calle Dulumbayan, now known as Rizal Avenue. It was established in 1900, and was known to have existed until the 1920s.

=== American period ===
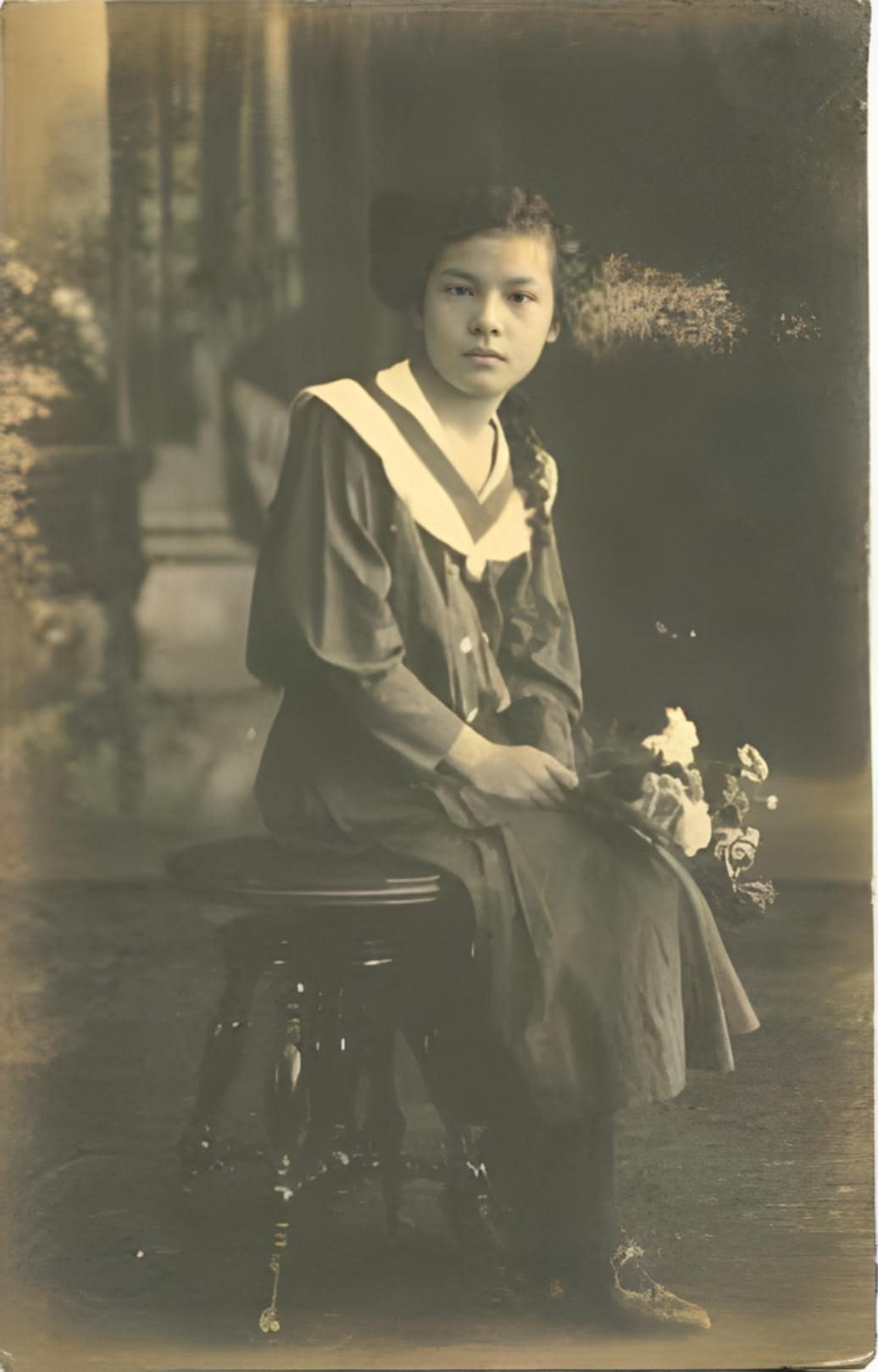
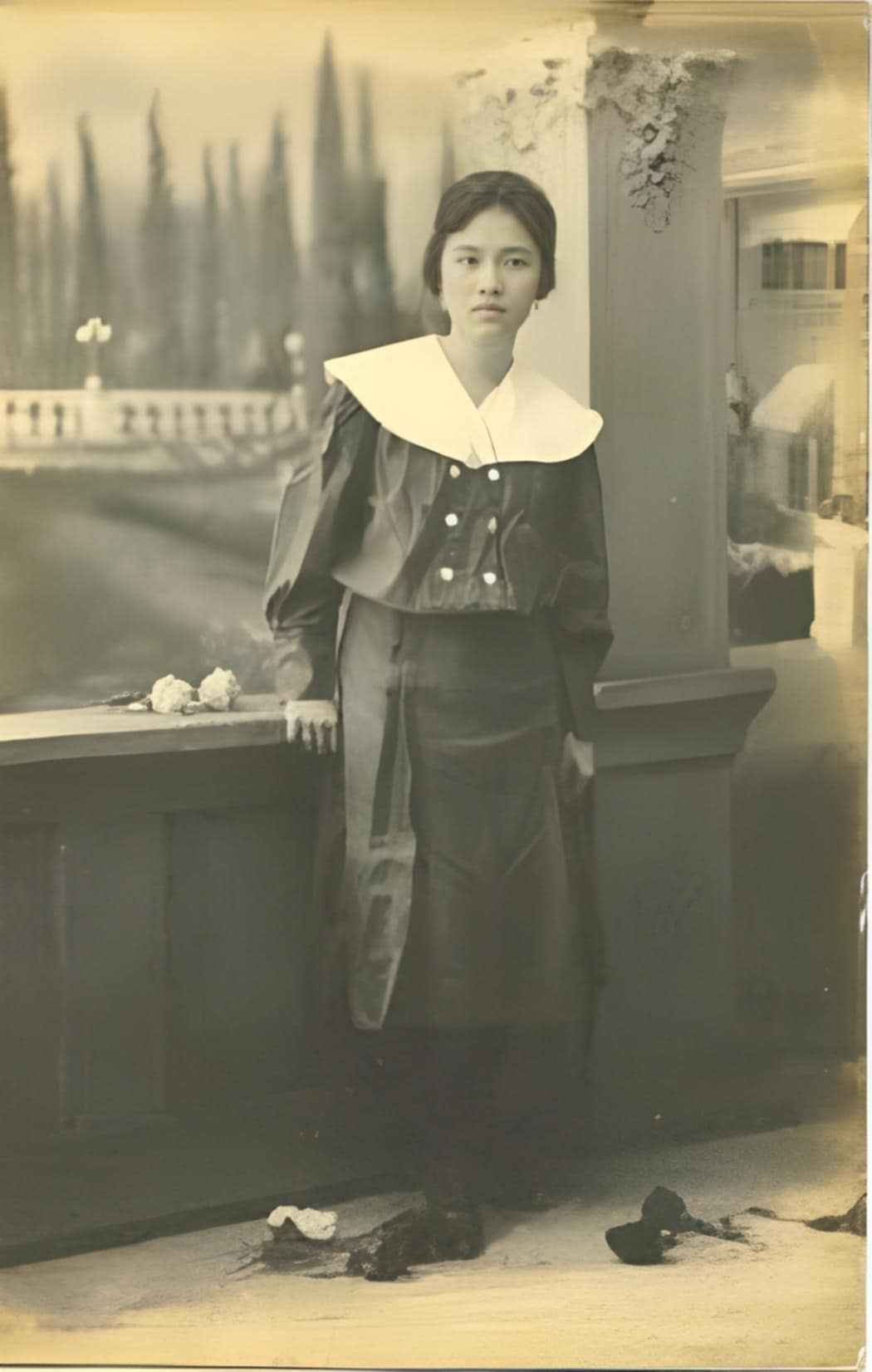
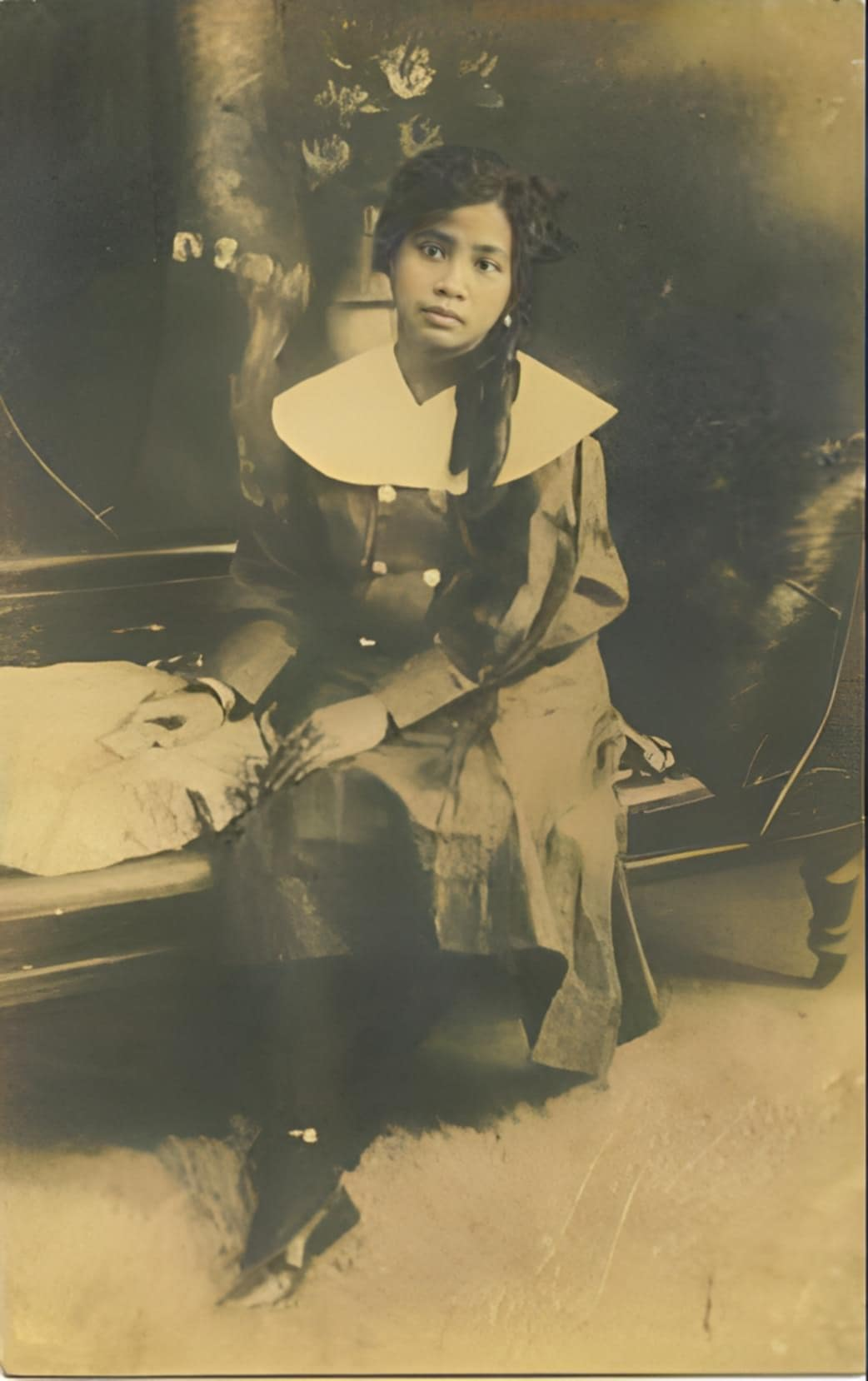
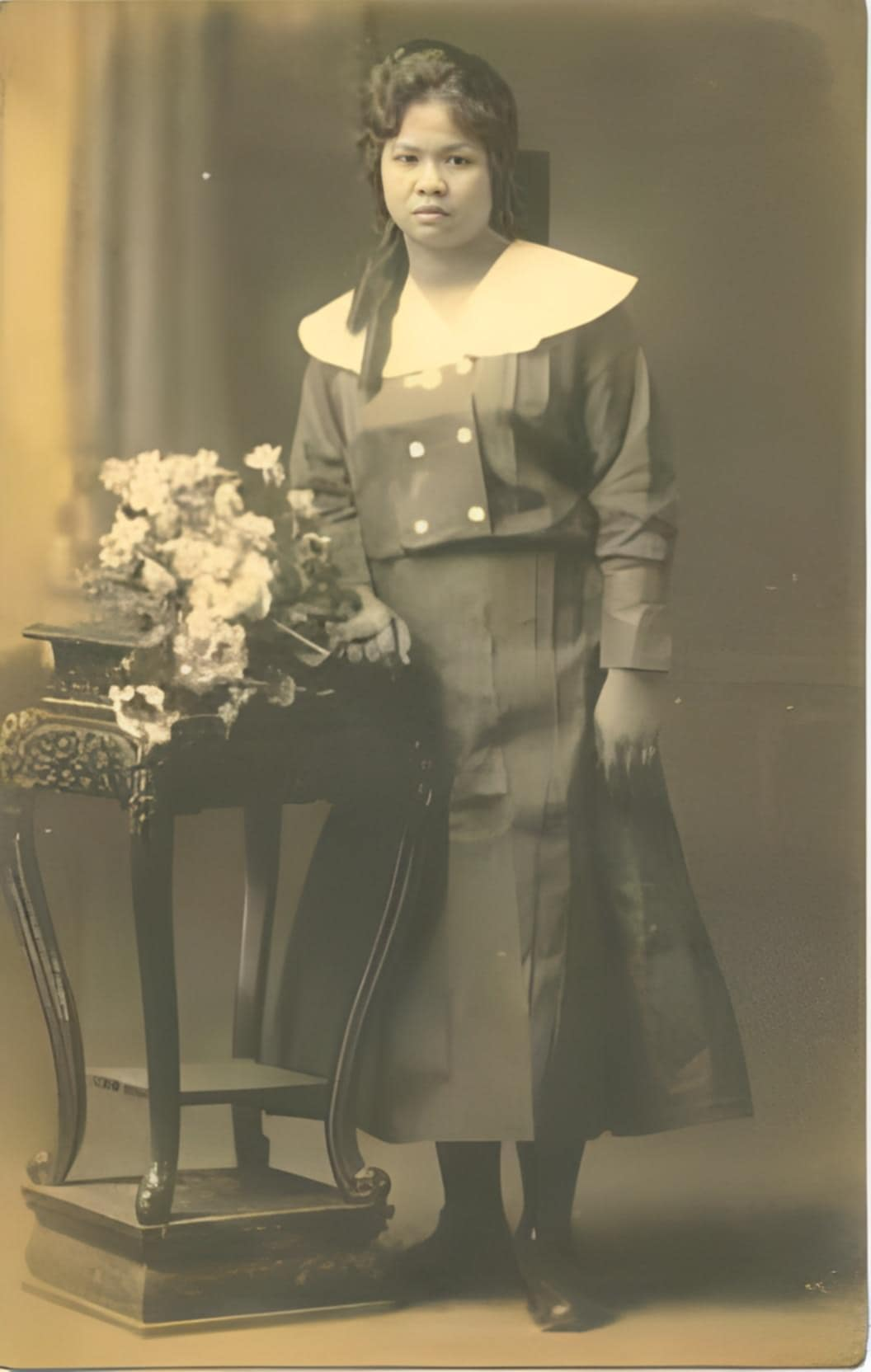
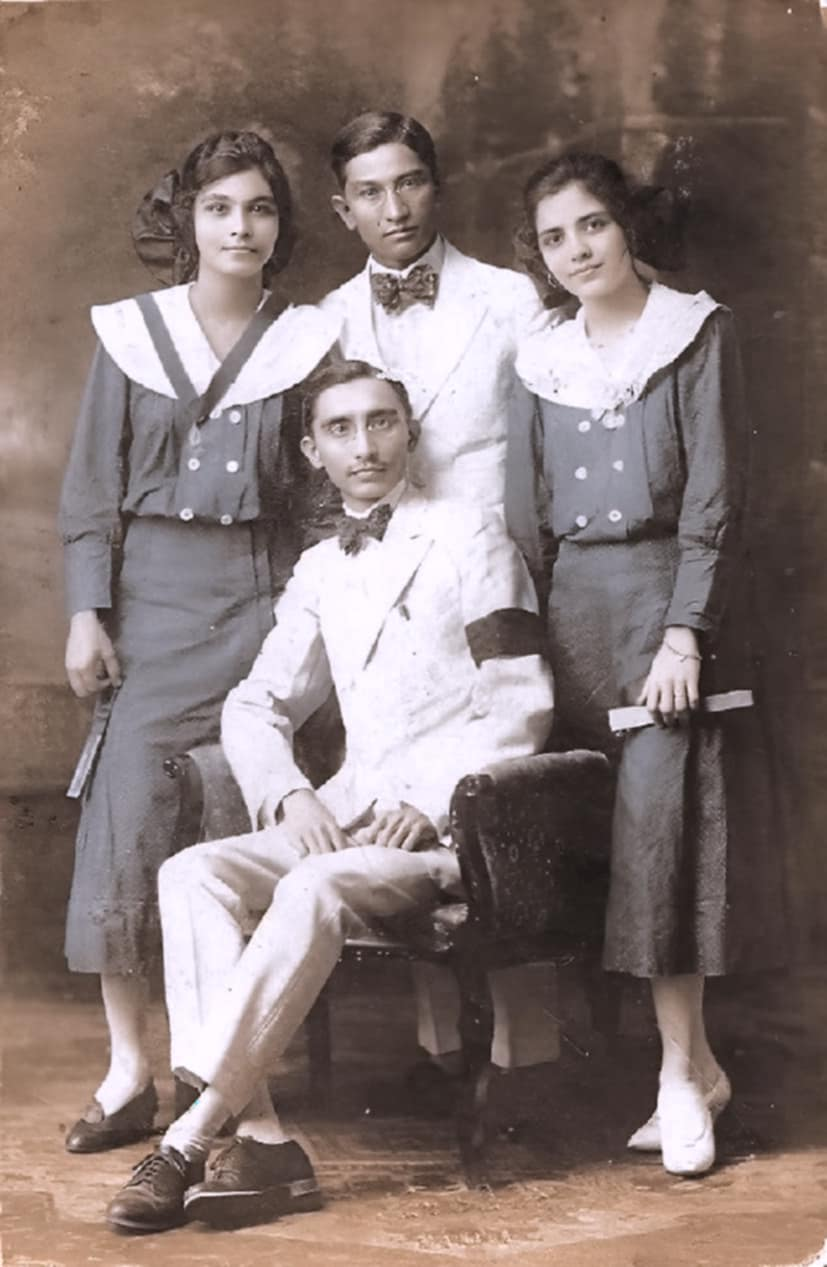
Female school uniforms of Internas of the Real Colegio de Sta. Ysabel, 1918.

About a year after securing Manila, the Americans were keen to open up seven schools with army service members teaching with army command-selected books and supplies. In the same year, 1899, more schools were opened, this time with 24 English-language teachers and 4500 students. In that system, primary education consisted of 6 years of elementary and four years of secondary schooling. Until recently, it prepared students for tertiary-level instruction to earn a degree and secure a job later in life.

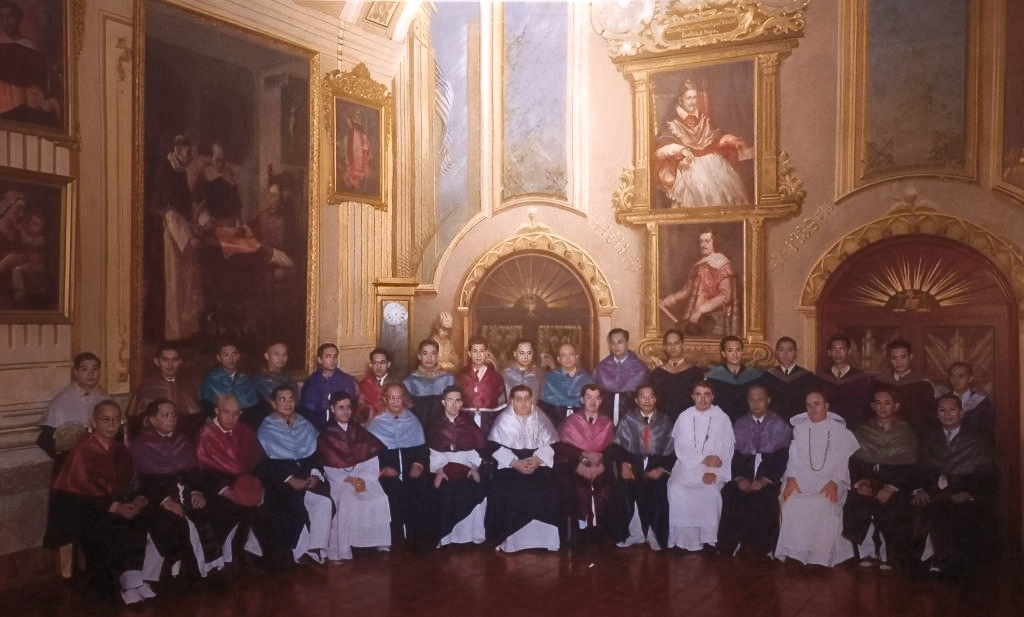
The Rector Magnificus and the professors of Civil Law pose for a group picture in full academic dress at the lobby of UST's original campus building in Intramuros, 1941. The paintings at the back were mostly saved, and are now kept at the UST Museum.

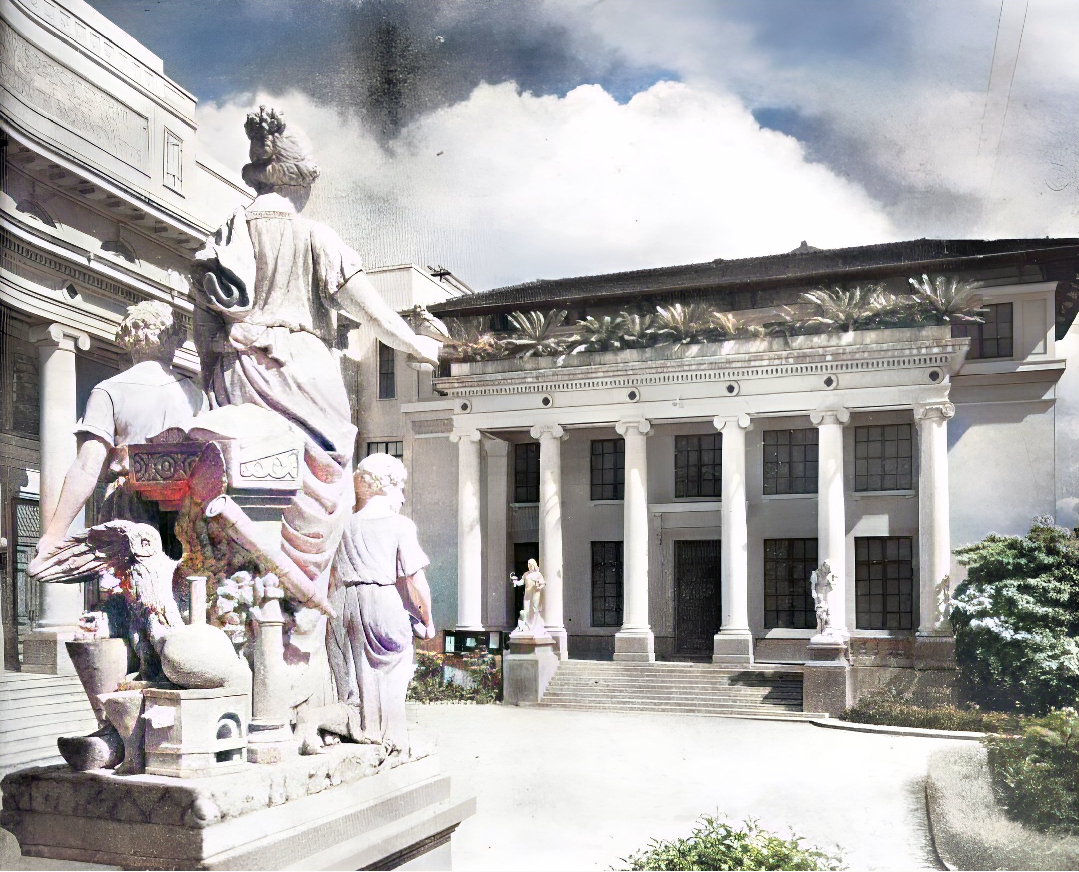
University of the Philippines in Manila.

A highly centralized, experimental public school system was installed in 1901 by the Philippine Commission and legislated by Act No. 74. The law exposed a severe shortage of qualified teachers by large enrollment numbers in schools. As a result, the Philippine Commission authorized the Secretary of Public Instruction to bring more than 1,000 teachers from the United States, called the Thomasites, to the Philippines between 1901 and 1902. These teachers were scattered throughout the islands to establish barangay schools. The same law established the Philippine Normal School (now the Philippine Normal University) to train aspiring Filipino teachers. Provincial governments supported the high school system. It included particular educational institutions, schools of arts and trades, an agricultural school, and commerce and marine institutes established in 1902 by the Philippine Commission.

Several other laws were passed throughout the period. In 1902, Act No. 372 authorized the opening of provincial high schools. While in 1908, Act No. 1870 initiated the opening of the University of the Philippines, now the country's national university.

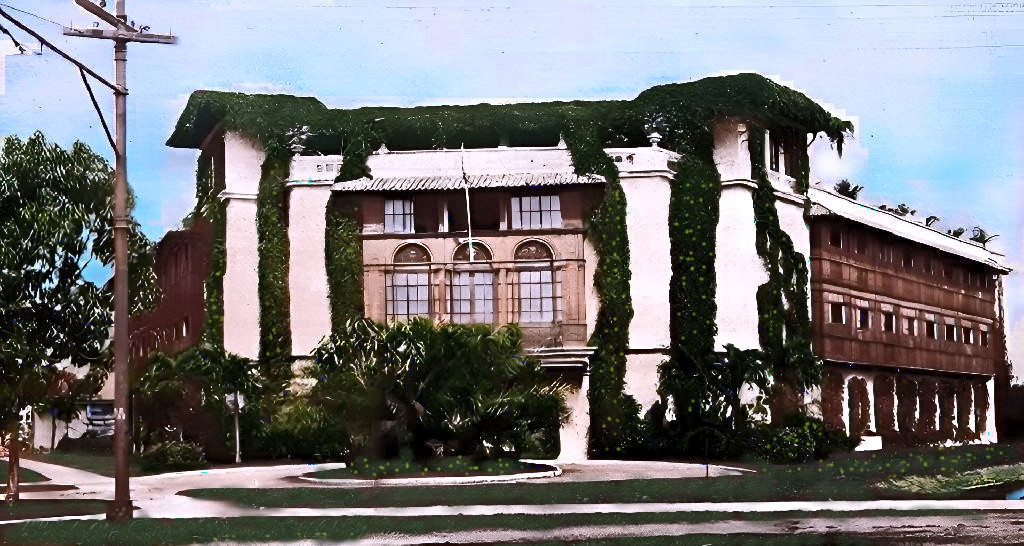
Normal Hall of Philippine Normal University built in 1914 serving as University dormitory

However, the emergence of high school education in the Philippines did not occur until 1910. It was borne out of rising numbers in enrollment, widespread economic depression, growing demand by big businesses and technological advances in factories, the emergence of electrification, and the growing need for skilled workers. High schools were created to meet this new job demand, and the curriculum focused on practical job skills that would better prepare students for professional white-collar or skilled blue-collar work. This proved beneficial for both the employer and the employee; the investment in human capital caused employees to become more efficient, which lowered costs for the employer, and skilled employees received a higher wage than those employees with just primary educational attainment.

However, a steady increase in school enrollment has hindered revisions to the then-implemented experimental educational system. Act No. 1801, also known as Gabaldon Law, was passed in 1907, which provided a fund of a million pesos for the construction of concrete school buildings and is one of many attempts by the government to meet this demand. In line with the Filipinization policy of the government, the Reorganization Act of 1916 provided that all department secretaries except the Secretary of Public Instruction must be natural-born Filipinos.

A series of revisions (in terms of content, length, and focus) to the curriculum began in 1925 when the Monroe Survey Commission released its findings. After failed attempts on implementing the curriculum, the K–12 curriculum implementation finally started on May 20, 2008, during the administration of Gloria Macapagal Arroyo when Senator Mar Roxas filed the Omnibus Education Reform Act of 2008 (Senate Bill 2294) and further emphasized with the signing of ASEAN Charter on December 15, 2008, aligning the country to other ASEAN countries which have K–12, and within both mandates in spirit and letter is the curriculum's effectivity on April 24, 2012, during the administration of Arroyo's successor Benigno Aquino III. The K–12 implementation process and phaseout of the 1945 K–10 curriculum took nine years and three Philippine presidents from Gloria Macapagal Arroyo in May 2008 to Rodrigo Duterte on June 5, 2017. After convening from 1906 to 1918, what was simply an advisory committee on textbooks was officiated in 1921 as the Board on Textbooks through Act No. 2957. However, the Board faced difficulties even up to the 1940s because financial problems hindered the possibility of newer adaptations of books.

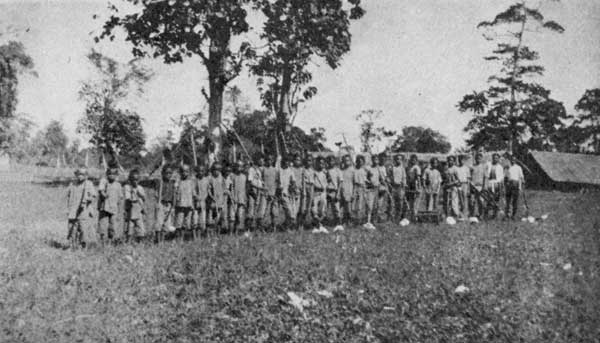
Boys of the Moro Agricultural School, Jolo, Sulu, 1923

The Moro Province originally had its own Department of Public Instruction, separate from the national system. Education rapidly expanded, with the number of teachers rising from 74 in 1904 to 239 by 1914. The number of schools rose from 52 in 1904 to 366 in 1920, with a corresponding increase in enrollment from 2114 to over 33,000. Such registration was primarily made up of first- and second-year students, after which attendance decreased. This increase also disproportionately benefited Christian inhabitants of the province, and most staff were Christians from elsewhere in the Philippine Islands. Perhaps less than 10% of Muslim children attended public schools in 1920, with attendance, remaining low throughout the American period. Education was primarily in English, and aimed to introduce American values to the local population. The Department of Public Instruction moved under the control of the National Bureau of Education in 1915. It was fully integrated into the national system by 1922, part of transferring government to local Filipinos as part of a pathway towards independence. Educational materials, when they began incorporating stories and cultural aspects from the Philippines, represented the mainstream Christian narrative. Under the Commonwealth of the Philippines, the national curriculum served as a tool to inoculate a single national identity across the diverse ethnolinguistic groups of the archipelago.

=== Japanese period and Second Republic ===
During the Japanese occupation, education indoctrinated the public to inculcate Japanese ideologies, causing low enrollment rates. The Japanese Military Administration's Order No. February 2, 17, 1942, had six basic points: the propagation of Filipino culture; the dissemination of the principle of the Greater East Asia Co-Prosperity Sphere; the spiritual rejuvenation of the Filipinos; the teaching and propagation of Nippongo; the diffusion of vocational and elementary education; and "the promotion of the love of labour".

After having been closed following the outbreak of the Pacific War, elementary schools, followed by vocational and regular schools, reopened. Colleges offering agriculture, medicine, fisheries, and engineering courses also resumed teaching. However, law courses were not instructed. Textbook passages concerning American ideologies of democracy were censored. Educational reforms required teachers to obtain licenses following rigorous examinations. All heads of educational institutions were also required to get support. Also, the teaching of Tagalog, Philippine History, and character education was reserved for Filipinos.

The Japanese created the following educational institutions: the Training Institute for former USAFFE soldiers; the Normal Institute; the Preparatory Institute of Government Scholars to Japan; the Government Employees Training Institute; the New Philippines Cultural Institute; the Central Constabulary Academy Branch No. 1 at the Mapa High School Building in Bagumpanahon; the Central Constabulary Academy Branch No. 2, at the former Araullo High School Building in Bagumbayan; the Central Constabulary Academy Branch No. 3 at the Torres High School Building in Bagumbuhay; the Central Constabulary Academy Branch No. 4 at the Legarda Elementary School in Bagumpanahon; the Central Constabulary Academy Branch No. 5; the Baguio Constabulary Academy; the Southern Luzon Constabulary Academy in Legazpi, Albay; the Constabulary Academy, Iloilo Branch; the Bureau of Constabulary Academy on Mandaue (Carlock) Street in Cebu; and the Davao Constabulary Academy. During this period, the Philippine Nautical School, which was renamed Seaman's Training Institute, remained in operation, and the Japanese authorities even increased its student population. A school established during the Japanese period which still exists is St. Paul College of Makati.

=== Third to Fifth Republic ===
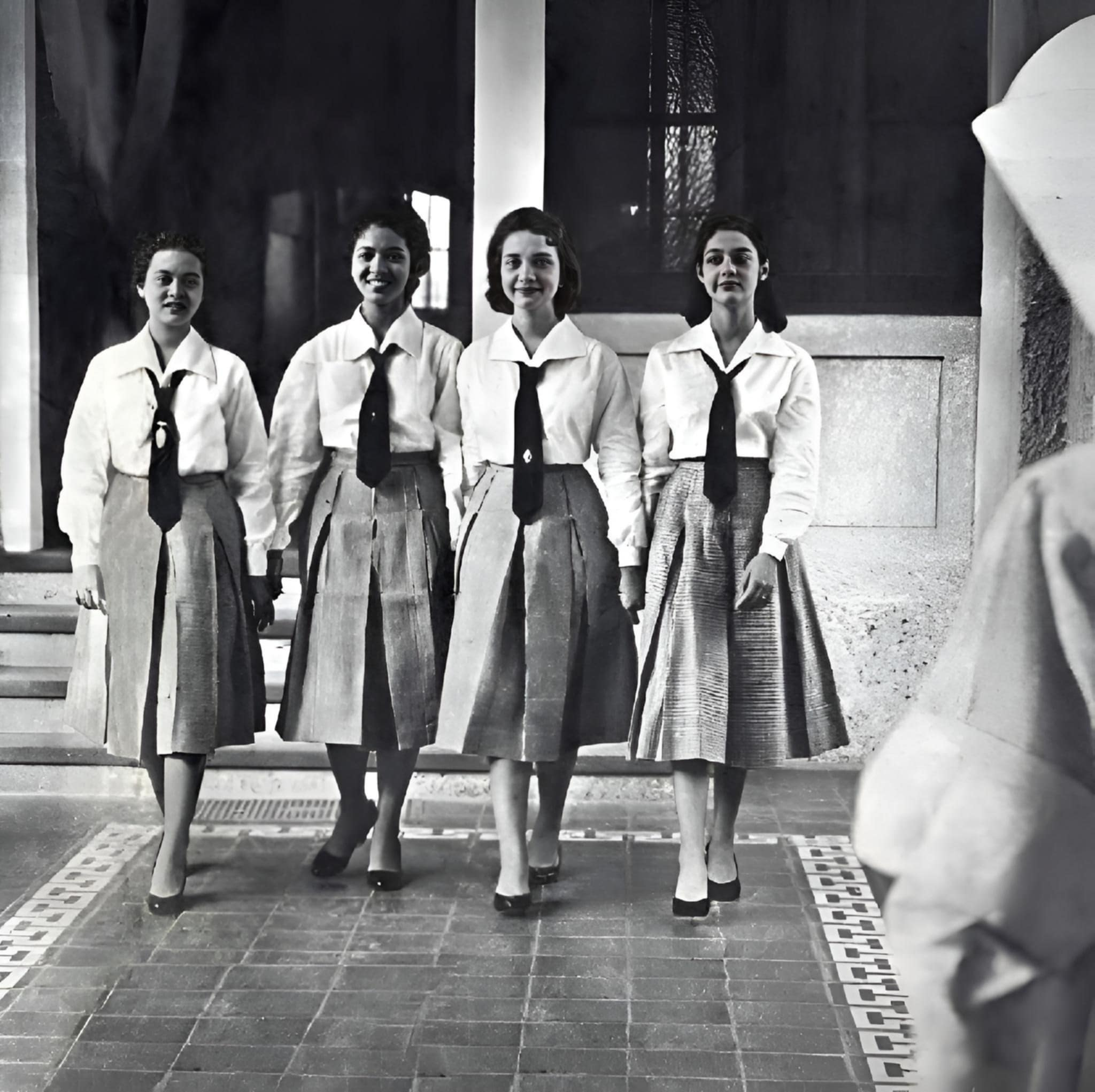
Students of St. Paul's College, Manila, Philippines 1960's.

The country's education sector underwent several changes throughout the years after the relinquishment of the United States of its authority all over the Philippines in 1947. Then President Manuel Roxas issued Executive Order No. 94, which renamed the Department of Instruction into the Department of Education with the regulation and supervision of public and private schools belonging to the Bureau of Public and Private Schools.

After the war, the public school system was rebuilt by launching the Philippine Community School program, which received worldwide recognition. As early as 1953, the educational development in the Philippines drew attention from neighbouring Asian countries, with several Asian educators visiting the country to observe and study the vocational industrial schools. The American colonial government recommended a shift to the American system: six years (instead of seven) for elementary, three years of junior high school, and three more years of senior high school, for 12 years of basic education. The transition began with the removal of Grade 7 from elementary, but the addition of two years in high school was never completed.

Following independence, Islamic schools began to spread in Mindanao, creating a parallel educational structure to higher education.

Under the Marcos administration, the Department of Education became the Department of Education and Culture and, consequently Ministry of Education and Culture through Proclamation No. 1081 and Presidential Decree No. 1397, respectively.

The Education Act of 1982 provided for an integrated system of education covering both formal and non-formal education at all levels. Section 29 of the act sought to upgrade educational institutions' standards to achieve "quality education" through voluntary accreditation for schools, colleges, and universities. Section 16 and Section 17 upgraded the obligations and qualifications required for teachers and administrators. Section 41 provided for government financial assistance to private schools.

After the ratification of the 1987 Philippine Constitution, the fundamental aims of education in the Philippines were defined, and most importantly, elementary schooling was made compulsory for all children. Meanwhile, the Free Public Secondary Education Act of 1988 or Republic Act 6655 mandated free public secondary education commencing in the school year 1988–1989.

In 1987, the Ministry of Education, Culture and Sports again became the Department of Education, Culture, and Sports under Executive Order No. 117 and remained practically unchanged until 1994.

According to the 1991 report by the Congressional Commission on Education (EDCOM), the department was recommended to be divided into three parts. Thus, the passage of the Republic Acts 7722 and 7796 in 1994 led to the "tri focalization" of the educational system in the Philippines. Republic Act 7722, or the Higher Education Act of 1994, created the Commission on Higher Education (CHED), which assumed the functions of the Bureau of Higher Education and supervised tertiary degree programs Republic Act 7796 or the Technical Education and Skills Development Act of 1994, created the Technical Education and Skills Development Authority (TESDA), which absorbed the Bureau of Technical-Vocational Education as well as the National Manpower and Youth Council, and began to supervise non-degree technical-vocational programs. Meanwhile, the Department of Education, Culture, and Sports retained all elementary and secondary education responsibilities.

=== Contemporary period ===
The start of the twenty-first century saw a significant change in the Philippine education system. In August 2001, Republic Act 9155, otherwise called the Governance of Basic Education Act, was passed. This act changed the department's name to the current Department of Education (DepEd) and redefined the role of field offices (regional offices, division offices, district offices and schools). The act also provided the overall framework for school empowerment by strengthening the leadership roles of principals and fostering transparency and local accountability for school administrations.

In January 2009, the DepEd signed a memorandum of agreement with the United States Agency for International Development (USAID) to seal US$86 million in assistance to Philippine education, particularly the access to quality education in the Autonomous Region of Muslim Mindanao (ARMM), and the Western and Central Mindanao regions.

On June 4, 2010, during the final days of the administration of Gloria Macapagal-Arroyo, the 2010 Secondary Education Curriculum (SEC, or DepEd Order 76, Series of 2010) was implemented. The 2010 SEC, which focused on teaching and learning for understanding, was scheduled to be progressively mainstreamed from 2010 to 2014; however, it was only in effect until June 1, 2015, and was phased out due to the 9-year implementation process of the K–12 program that also started during the Arroyo administration upon its effectivity on Grade 10 (which changed from Fourth Year to Grade 10).

Republic Act No. 10533, or the Enhanced Basic Education Act of 2013, was signed by President Benigno Aquino III in May 2013.

After decades of surveys, consultations, and studies starting with the Monroe Survey in 1925 during the American period, the implementation of K–12 curriculum finally began on May 20, 2008, when Senator Mar Roxas filed the Omnibus Education Reform Act of 2008 (Senate Bill 2294) to strengthen the Philippine education system through timely interventions on the quality of teachers, the medium of instruction used and the evaluation of students' aptitude, among other aspects and through the ASEAN Charter signed on December 15, 2008. Both mandate the effectivity of K–12 four years later on April 24, 2012, which increase in the number of years in basic education, from 10 years to 12 years as consistent with global standards. Senator and presidential candidate Benigno Aquino III then adopted the position of SB 2294 seven days after the start of the 2010s on January 7, 2010; he said this will "give everyone an equal chance to succeed" and "have quality education and profitable jobs." On June 6, 2011, Kindergarten became compulsory as a requirement for the effectivity of K–12 and start of phasing out K–10 on April 24 of the following year.

The K–12 educational system—one year of Kindergarten, six years of elementary education, four years of junior high school education, and two years of senior high school education—became effective on April 24, 2012; the K–12 also included a new curriculum for all schools nationwide. To guarantee continuity of the K–12 Program in the succeeding years, Kindergarten was formally made compulsory by the Kindergarten Education Act of 2012, while the further twelve years were institutionalized by the Enhanced Basic Education Act of 2013. The 1945 K–10 system was entirely phased out on June 5, 2017, upon K–12 became effective in Grade 6, ending the implementation process of the K–12 curriculum that spanned for 9 years from the administrations of Gloria Macapagal-Arroyo to Rodrigo Duterte.

In 2017, the Universal Access to Quality Tertiary Education Act was signed by Rodrigo Duterte, mandating the government through all state universities and colleges (SUCs) to provide free tertiary education for all Filipino citizens. The mandate does not include private schools; however, certain subsidies for students enrolled in private higher education institutions are available. On September 4, 2026, President Bongbong Marcos signed a law amending the Universal Access to Quality Tertiary Education Act or Republic Act No. 12325.

In 2020, the impact of the COVID-19 pandemic on education include mental health during the COVID-19 pandemic. Several schools shut down and student enrollment dropped during the COVID-19 pandemic in the Philippines. As schools shifted to remote learning, students and teachers experienced difficulties due to the lack of gadgets, inadequate allowance for internet fees, and poor internet connection. These disruptions contributed to learning loss and increased incidence of mental health issues. According to the Asian Development Bank, Filipino students lost 61% of the expected years of schooling by age 18 due to prolonged closure of in-person classes. The Philippines and Venezuela were the last countries to resume face-to-face classes.

In January 2021, the alternative learning system (ALS) was institutionalized by a law signed by President Duterte.

On April 27, 2023, former president Gloria Macapagal Arroyo's version of K–12 named K+10+2 was filed under House Bill (HB) 7893. It involves mandatory Kindergarten and Grades 1 to 10, and one have an option to take senior high school as a requirement for college education.

The second "less congested" and "revised" version of K–12 for Elementary and Junior High School, called the "Matatag curriculum", was launched by the DepEd, headed by Vice President Sara Duterte, in August 2023. This version of the K–12 reduced the learning areas for students from seven to five, and removed Mother Tongue as a separate subject; it also emphasized a "Makabansa" learning area to instill Filipino identity and nationalism among students. It is implemented in phases from 2024 to 2028 on Kindergarten to Grade 10. A revised version for Senior High School, called "Strengthened Senior High School Program" launched by the DepEd, Secretary Sonny Angara in June 2025. This version of the Senior High School program has two main tracks, such as Academic and Technical-Professional (TechPro), replacing the previous four-track system. Reduced from 15 to 5 core subjects, such as Effective Communication or Mabisang Komunikasyon, General Mathematics, General Science, Life and Career Skills, and Philippine History and Society or Pag-aaral ng Kasaysayan at Lipunang Pilipino. Work Immersion will increased from 80 to 320 hours to 320–640 hours. Its implementation starts from 2026 to 2028.

On November 12, 2026, President Bongbong Marcos signed the law under Republic Act No. 12327, also known as the "Basic Education Voucher Assistance Act".

== Statistics ==
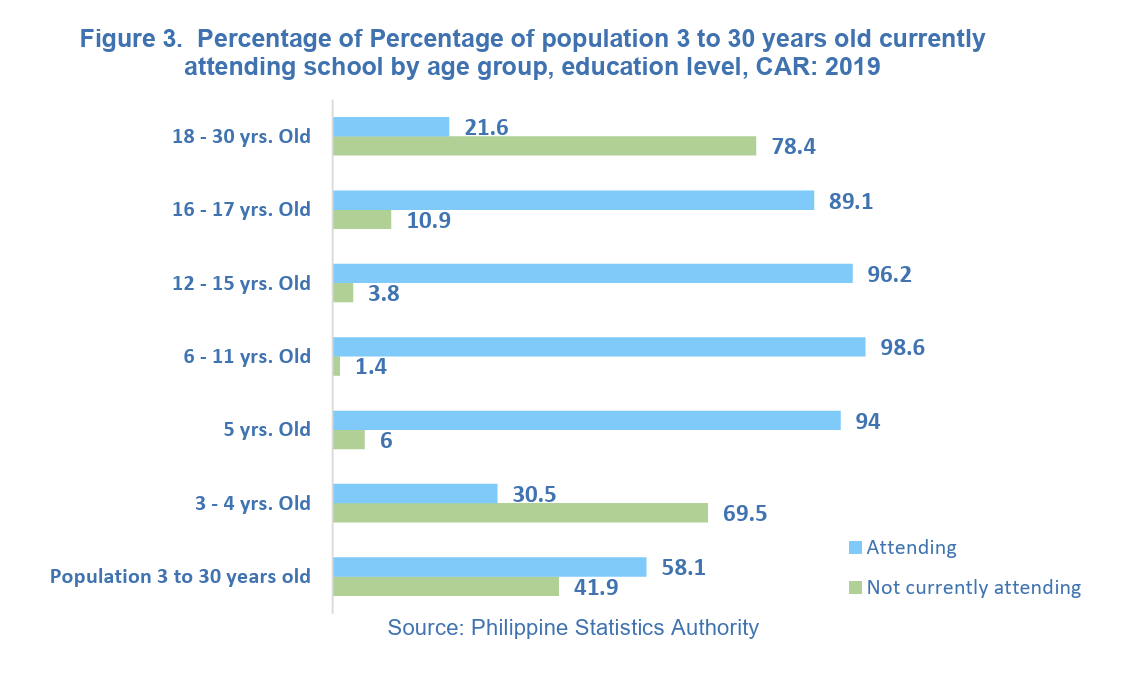
Educational attendance in the Philippines in 2019

In 2020, 32 million students aged 5 to 24 were enrolled in school in the Philippines. Enrollment in K–12 has increased from 24 million in the 2013 to 2014 school year to 28 million in the 2022 to 2023 school year. Additionally, 640,000 out-of-school learners studied in the Alternative Learning System. In 2023, 1.6 million children and adolescents, aged 5 to 17, were out of school. This represents 6% of school-aged children from K-12. Participation in early childhood education is limited, with 30.5% of children aged 3 to 4 attending preschool.

=== Completion rate ===
The completion rate for primary education was 95.9%, 81.7% for lower secondary education, and 72.6% for upper secondary education in 2022. Among upper secondary students, aged 16 and 17, 12% are not attending school due to employment or lack of interest. This group is less likely to complete secondary schooling. In 2019, 24.4% of Filipinos aged 25 and over completed a bachelor's or equivalent degree.

=== Learning outcomes ===
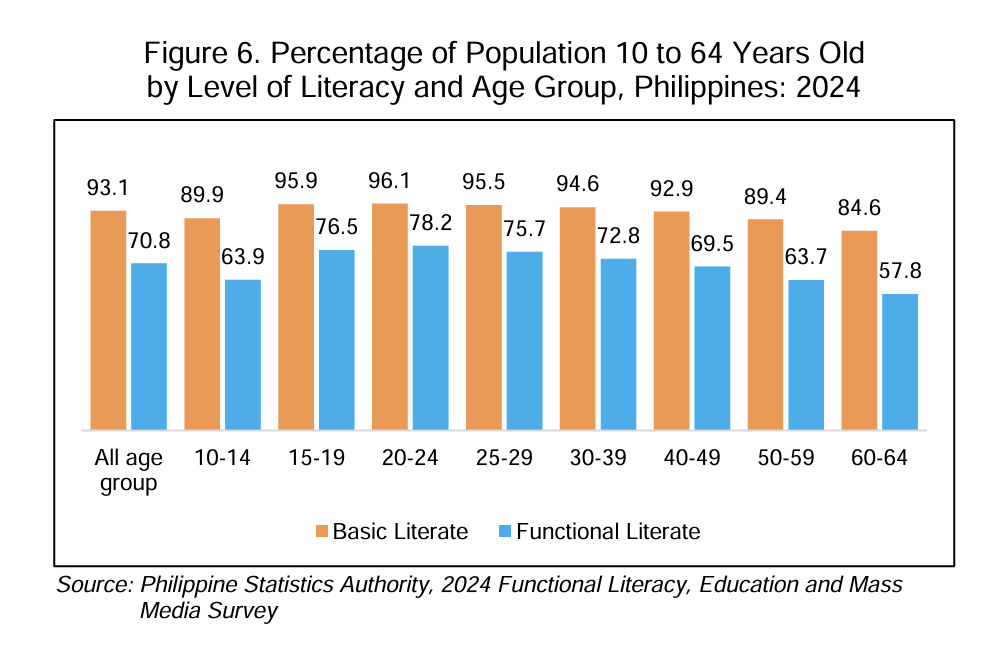
Basic and functional literacy rates in 2024

According to the Philippine Statistics Authority's (PSA) 2024 Functional Literacy, Education, and Mass Media Survey (FLEMMS), 93.1% of Filipinos aged 10 to 64 had basic literacy and 70.8% had functional literacy. The PSA defines functional literacy as including higher level comprehension skills such as integrating and making inferences with information.

Foundational skills attainment in basic literacy and numeracy remains elusive. In 2019, only 10% of students at the end of their primary education achieved the minimum reading standard and 17% achieved the minimum mathematical standard.

==== Disparities ====
Significant disparities exist in educational outcomes across different regions and socioeconomic groups. The Philippines Early Childhood Education Longitudinal Study in 2022 found that students from urban poor and conflict-affected areas tend to have lower socio-emotional skills compared to similar aged peers that attended preschool or daycare programs. According to the 2024 FLEMMS report, basic literacy rates also vary by region, with Central Luzon having the highest rate at 92.8%, while the Bangsamoro Autonomous Region in Muslim Mindanao reported a lower rate of 81%.

Dropout rates varied by gender, with 8% of senior high school boys and 5% of senior high school girls leaving school before completion. As for higher educational attainment, 49% of individuals in the richest income decline pursue higher education, compared to only 17% of those in the poorest decile.

== Educational stages ==
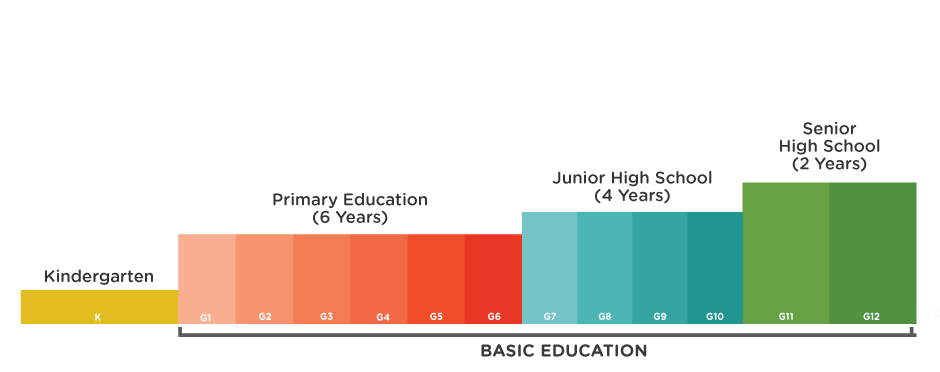
The 13 years of compulsory education in the Philippines is divided into kindergarten, primary education, junior high school, and senior high school.

Formal education is the hierarchically structured, chronologically graded 'education system', running from primary school through the university and including, in addition to general academic studies, various specialized programs and institutions for full-time technical and professional training.

K–12 and tertiary education from colleges are characterized as formal education. This does not include the informal education in the Philippines learned from daily experience, the educative influences and resources in their environment, or alternative learning systems provided by the Department of Education (DepEd), Technical Education and Skills Development Authority (TESDA) and other programs from educational institutions.

Basic education is grouped into four key stages: 1st key stage (kindergarten–grade 3), 2nd key stage (grades 4–6), 3rd key stage (grades 7–10) and 4th key stage (grades 11–12).

=== K–11 (1901–1945) ===
Education system implemented from 1901 to May 28, 1945 (K–11)
School	Grade level	Ages
Pre-elementary school	Kindergarten	5-6 and up
Basic education
Elementary school	Grade 1	6-7 and up
Elementary school	Grade 2	7-8 and up
Elementary school	Grade 3	8-9 and up
Elementary school	Grade 4	9-10 and up
Elementary school	Grade 5	10-11 and up
Elementary school	Grade 6	11-12 and up
Elementary school	Grade 7	12-13 and up
High school	1st year	13-14 and up
High school	2nd year	14-15 and up
High school	3rd year	15-16 and up
High school	4th year	16-17 and up
Higher education
Undergraduate school	Varies	17 and up
Graduate school	Varies	21 and up
Continuing education
Vocational	Varies	17 and up

During the American period, the Philippines had three levels of education: the "elementary" level, which consisted of four primary years and 3 intermediate years; the "secondary" or high school level, consisting of four years; and the "college" or tertiary level. Every child from age 7 was required to register in schools in their respective town or province; students were given free school materials. Religion was not part of the curriculum of the schools as it had been during the Spanish period.

=== K–4th Year (1945–2017) ===
Education system implemented from May 28, 1945, to June 5, 2017 (K–10)
School	Grade	Age
Pre-elementary school	Kindergarten	5-6 or 4-5 and up
Compulsory education
Elementary school	Grade 1	6-7 or 5-6 and up
Elementary school	Grade 2	7-8 or 6-7 and up
Elementary school	Grade 3	8-9 or 7-8 and up
Elementary school	Grade 4	9-10 or 8-9 and up
Elementary school	Grade 5	10-11 or 9-10 and up
Elementary school	Grade 6	11-12 or 10-11 and up
High school	1st year	12-13 or 11-12 and up
High school	2nd year	13-14 or 12-13 and up
High school	3rd year	14-15 or 13-14 and up
High school	4th year	15-16 or 14-15 and up
Higher education
Undergraduate school	Varies	16 or 15 and up
Graduate school	Varies	20 or 19 and up
Continuing education
Vocational	Varies	16 or 15 and up

The K–4th Year system was used and implemented for 72 years from May 28, 1945, until K–12 curriculum became effective in Grade 6 on June 5, 2017. This consisted of one-year non-compulsory preschool education, six-year compulsory elementary education, and four-year compulsory high school education. Although public preschool, elementary, and high school education are free, only primary education is mandatory according to the 1987 Philippine Constitution.

Pre-primary education caters to children aged five; a child aged six could enter elementary school without pre-primary education. Following primary education is four years of secondary education, divided into three years of lower secondary and one year of upper secondary education; ideally, a child would enter secondary education at the age of 12. After completing secondary education, students may progress to a technical education and skills development to earn a certificate or a diploma within one to three years, depending on the skill.

The K–4th Year system co-implemented with the current K–12 curriculum from May 20, 2008, until it was entirely phased out on June 5, 2017, upon the effectivity of K–12 in Grade 6. The last batch of this curriculum's high school students completed secondary education at the end of 2014–2015, with the elementary following in 2016–2017.

=== K–12 (2008–present) ===
Current education system implemented since May 20, 2008 (K–12) Effective: April 24, 2012
School	Grade level	Ages
Pre-elementary school	Kindergarten	5-6 or 4-5 and up
Basic education
Elementary school	Grade 1	6-7 or 5-6 and up
Elementary school	Grade 2	7-8 or 6-7 and up
Elementary school	Grade 3	8-9 or 7-8 and up
Elementary school	Grade 4	9-10 or 8-9 and up
Elementary school	Grade 5	10-11 or 9-10 and up
Elementary school	Grade 6	11-12 or 10-11 and up
Junior high school	Grade 7	12-13 or 11-12 and up
Junior high school	Grade 8	13-14 or 12-13 and up
Junior high school	Grade 9	14-15 or 13-14 and up
Junior high school	Grade 10	15-16 or 14-15 and up
Senior high school	Grade 11	16-17 or 15-16 and up
Senior high school	Grade 12	17-18 or 16-17 and up
Higher education
Undergraduate school	Varies	18 or 17 and up
Graduate school	Varies	22 or 21 and up
Continuing education
Vocational	Varies	18 or 17 and up

The current basic education system in the Philippines from May 20, 2008, and became effective on April 24, 2012, with implementation process spanned for 9 years from May 2008 to June 5, 2017, during the administrations of Gloria Macapagal Arroyo to Rodrigo Duterte and the curriculum's effectivity as part of it, comprises kindergarten and 12 years of primary and secondary education, all of which are compulsory. Students also have the option to enroll in higher education programs to earn a baccalaureate degree.

The new system divided secondary education into two: junior high school (from the first four years of the 1945–2017 K–4th Year system), and senior high school, which encompasses the 11th and 12th year of the new educational system. Senior high school serves as specialized upper secondary education, where students may choose a specialization based on aptitude, interests, and school capacity. The choice of career track will define the content of the subjects a student will take in grades 11 and 12. Because of the shift in the curriculum, the general education curriculum in college will have fewer units, as these subjects taken up in basic education will be removed.

Despite dating back as far as 1925 with the Monroe Survey during the American period, the implementation of the K–12 curriculum only began on May 20, 2008, through the filing of the Omnibus Education Reform Act of 2008 (Senate Bill 2294) by Senator Mar Roxas and later emphasized by the ASEAN Charter on December 15, 2008. Kindergarten then became compulsory three years later on June 6, 2011, as a requirement for the effectivity of K–12 and start of phasing out process the 1945 or K–4th Year system on April 24 of the following year upon the start of the next school year (SY 2012–2013). On April 24, 2012, the K–12 became effective where the new curriculum was implemented on Grades 1 and 7 (with the latter changing from First Year to Grade 7); the K–4th Year system was entirely phased out on June 5, 2017, when K–12 was effective on Grade 6 which ended the 9-year implementation process of the new curriculum.

There were four phases during the implementation of the new system: Phase I: Laying the Foundations, which aimed to implement the universal kindergarten and the development of the program; Phase II: Modeling and Migration, which aimed to promote the enactment of the fundamental education law and to start the phased implementation of the new curriculum for grades 1 to 10, and for the modelling of the senior high school; Phase III: Complete Migration, which aimed to implement the old high school finally and to signal the end of migration to the new educational system; and Phase IV: Completion of the Reform, where the implementation of the K–12 education system is completed.

K–12 changed some of the subject's names, such as Sibika and Kultura (Civics and Culture) from grades 1 to 3 and Heograpiya, Kasaysayan, at Sibika (Geography, History, and Civics) from 4 to 6 to Araling Panlipunan (Social Studies) where the name, originally only used at high school under K–4th Year, is now also used in elementary.

The Philippine government since the Arroyo administration on May 20, 2008, through the Omnibus Education Reform Act of 2008 filed by Mar Roxas and ASEAN Charter, justified the implementation of K–12 which included the effectivity of the new curriculum on April 24, 2012, during the administration of Arroyo's successor Benigno Aquino III as part of the 9-year process because the Philippines was the only country in Asia and one of the three countries worldwide with a 10-year pre-university cycle (Angola, Djibouti and Myanmar); the national government and later DepEd from 2012 also said the 13-year program is found to be the best period for learning under primary education, and is also the recognized standard for students and professionals globally. This further emphasized when Arroyo planned to make her own version of K–12 in 2023 named K+10+2.

== K–12 education ==
K–12 education in the Philippines covers kindergarten and 12 years of primary education to provide sufficient time for mastery of concepts and skills, develop lifelong learners, and prepare graduates for tertiary education, middle-level skills development, employment, and entrepreneurship. Education is compulsory for all children, and free public education is provided for pre-elementary, elementary, and high school.

Schooling is divided into pre-elementary school, primary education, called elementary school, and secondary education, divided into junior high school and senior high school.

=== Pre-elementary ===
Children usually enter kindergarten at age 5. Pupils are mandated to learn the alphabet, numbers, shapes and colors through games, songs, pictures, and dances in their native language; thus, after grade 1, every student can read in their native tongue. The 12 original mother tongue languages introduced for the curriculum's effectivity in the 2012–2013 school year are:

- Bikol
- Cebuano
- Chavacano
- Hiligaynon
- Ilocano
- Kapampangan
- Maguindanaoan
- Maranao
- Pangasinan
- Tagalog
- Tausug
- Waray-Waray

Seven more mother tongue languages were added during the 2013–2014 school year: Aklanon, Ibanag, Ivatan, Kinaray-a, Sambal, Surigaonon and Yakan.

=== Primary education ===
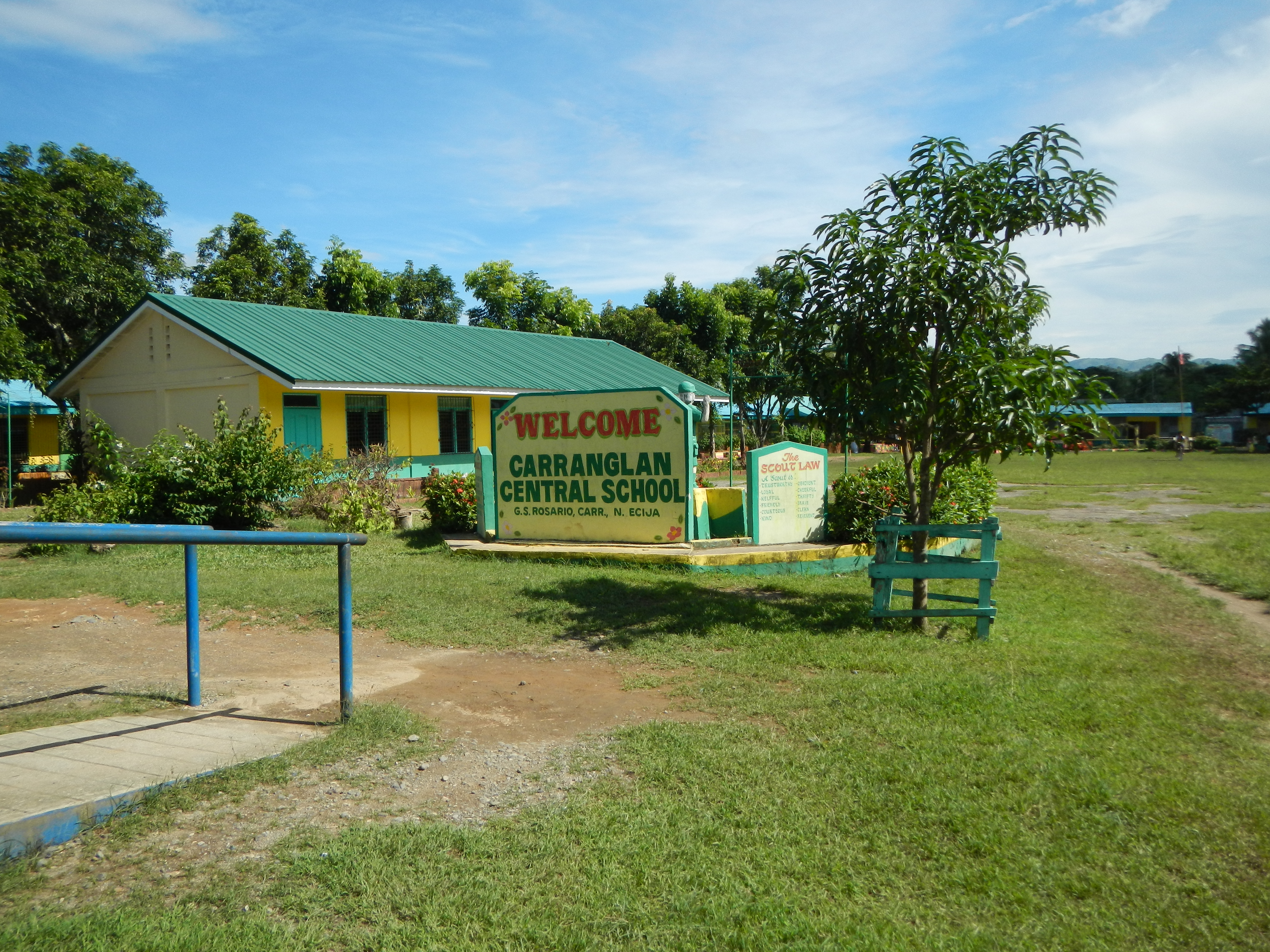
Carranglan Central School in Carranglan, Nueva Ecija

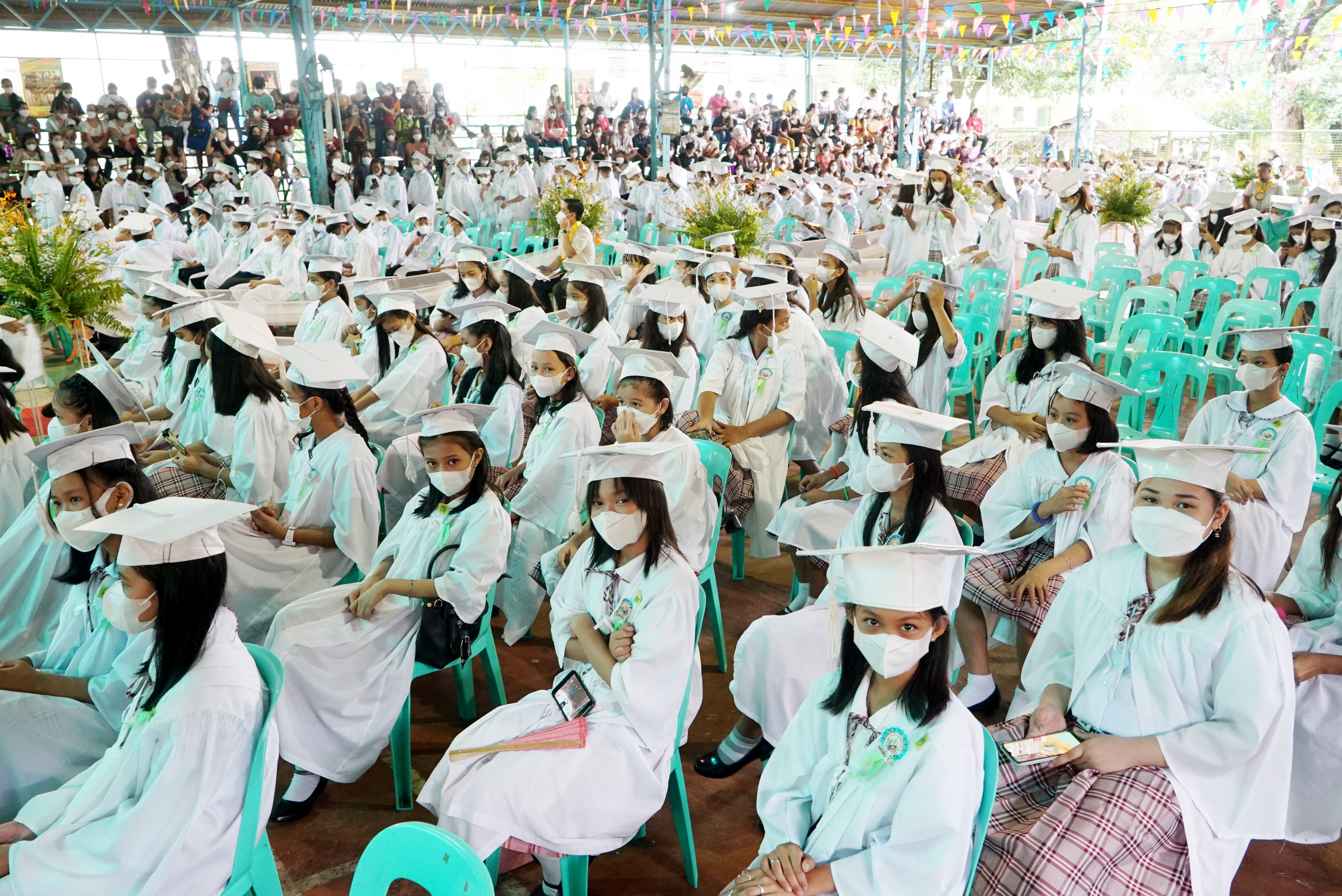
An elementary school graduation ceremony in Caloocan on July 8, 2022

Elementary school, sometimes called primary or grade school (Filipino: paaralang primarya, paaralang elementarya, or mababang paaralan), includes the first six years of compulsory education (grades 1–6) after mandatory preschool education Kindergarten.

From Kindergarten until grade 3, students are taught using their mother tongue, except for Filipino and English subjects; the mother tongue is also a separate subject for grades 1–3. English and Filipino are taught with a focus on "oral fluency". By grade 3, English and Filipino are gradually introduced as languages of instruction for other subjects.

Before the adoption of the Mother Tongue-Based Multilingual Education (MTB-MLE) system in 2012, a bilingual policy was used, wherein the medium of instruction was the Filipino language for Filipino, Araling Panlipunan, Edukasyong Pangkatawan, Kalusugan at Musika; English language was used for English, Science and Technology, Home Economics, and Livelihood Education. In July 2009, the DepEd ordered all elementary schools to implement mother-tongue-based instruction (from grades 1–3), with Filipino and English languages to be phased in as the language of instruction. A few private schools mainly catering to the elite include Spanish in their curriculum. In December 2007, President Gloria Macapagal Arroyo planned to reinstate Spanish as a mandatory subject in all Filipino schools starting in 2008, but this did not come into effect. International English language schools use English as the foundational language. Chinese schools add two language subjects, Min Nan Chinese and Mandarin Chinese, and may use English or Chinese as the foundational language.

In public schools, the core subjects introduced starting in grade 1 include Mathematics, Filipino, and Araling Panlipunan (synonymous with Social studies). English is only taught after the second semester of grade 1; Science is introduced starting in grade 3. Starting as early as grade 1, Science and Mathematics subjects use the spiral progression approach that requires every lesson be taught in increasing complexity in every grade level until grade 10. Other significant subjects include Mother Tongue (grades 1–3); Edukasyong Pantahanan at Pangkabuhayan (EPP) for grades 4 and 5; Technology and Livelihood Education (TLE) for grade 6; and Edukasyon sa Pagpapakatao (synonymous to Ethics, Values or Character Education), and Music, Arts, Physical Education, and Health (MAPEH). In private schools, separate subjects are offered, including Computer Education; however, Computer Education is included in EPP and TLE through its ICT component. Religious Education is part of the curriculum in Christian and Catholic schools. International schools offer subjects in their language and culture.

Until 2004, primary students traditionally took the National Elementary Achievement Test (NEAT) administered by the Department of Education, Culture and Sports (DECS). The NEAT was intended to measure a school's competence, not as a predictor of student aptitude or success in secondary school; hence, the scores obtained by students in the NEAT were not used as a basis for their admission into secondary school. In 2004, when DECS was officially converted into the Department of Education, the NEAT was changed to the National Achievement Test (NAT); both public and private elementary schools take this exam to measure a school's competency. As of 2006, only private schools have entrance examinations for secondary schools.

=== Secondary education ===
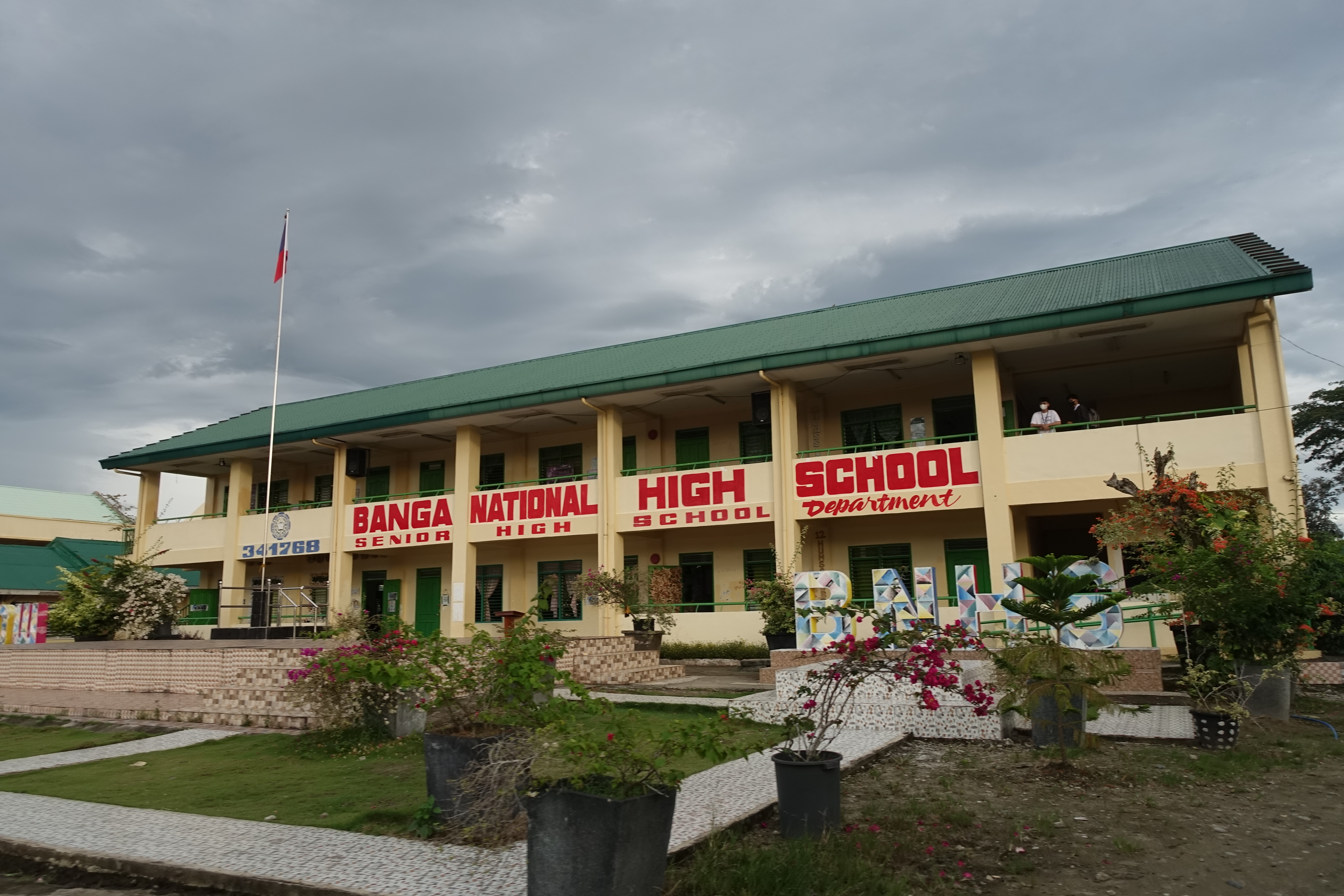
Banga National High School in Banga, South Cotabato

Secondary school in the Philippines, more commonly known as "high school" (Filipino: paaralang sekundarya or mataas na paaralan), consists of 4 lower and two upper levels: the lower exploratory high school system called "junior high school" (grades 7–10), and the upper specialized high school system called "senior high school" (grades 11 and 12). There are also science secondary schools for students who have demonstrated a particular gift in science at the primary level as well as special secondary schools and special curricular programs. Prior to the K–12 system, high school consisted of only four groups, with each level partially compartmentalized, focusing on a particular theme or content.

There are four main types of high school: the general secondary school, which enroll more than 90 per cent of all junior high school students; the general comprehensive high school; the secondary vocational school; and the special secondary school.

==== Junior high school ====
Students graduating from the elementary level automatically enroll in junior high, which covers four years from grades 7 to 10. Some private secondary schools have competitive entrance requirements based on an entrance examination. Entrance to science, art, and schools with special curricular programs is also by competitive analysis, sometimes including interviews and auditions.

The Department of Education specifies a compulsory public and private curriculum for all junior high school students. There are five core subjects: Science, Mathematics, English, Filipino, and Araling Panlipunan (Social Studies). Other subjects in all levels of junior high school include MAPEH (a collective subject comprising Music, Art, Physical Education and Health), Character Education (Edukasyon sa Pagpapakatao) and Technology and Livelihood Education (TLE).

Other public or private secondary schools offer specialized curricular programs for students with gifts and talents and aptitude in sciences and mathematics, sports, the arts, journalism, foreign language, or technical-vocational education. These are under the DepEd, with the latter in partnership with TESDA. These special programs for special schools are Science, Technology, Engineering Program (STE, formerly called ESEP); Special Program in Sports (SPS); Special Program in the Arts (SPA); Special Program in Journalism (SPJ); Special Program in Foreign Language (SPFL); and Special Program in Technical-Vocational Education (SPTVE). These programs offer comprehensive secondary education in a particular academic or career pathway field. Because of being career-pathway oriented, unique and advanced subjects are provided in place of TLE subjects and sometimes include even more time and topics for specialized learning and training.

In selective schools, various languages may be offered as electives, like in an SPFL program, and other subjects, such as computer programming and literary writing, like in STEM schools or Laboratory High Schools. Chinese schools have language and cultural electives. International Schools offer electives or subjects like writing, culture, history, language, art, or a particular subject unique to the school. Preparatory schools like technical vocational schools or schools with TVL Programs usually add some business, entrepreneurship, and accountancy courses.

A particular government-run art school, such as the Philippine High School for the Arts (PHSA) (which the Cultural Center of the Philippines administers in coordination with the Department of Education and the National Commission for Culture and the Arts) offers a specialized and exclusive curricular program. Students from PHSA must maintain grades in their art field of specialization to continue studying in the institution. Only SPA students can enroll in PHSA for the second year after passing the exclusive test, auditions, and interviews. These schools offer scholarships for students with high aptitude and talents in science fields or the art fields, granting those who pass rigorous and exclusive tests many unique benefits like free board and lodging, free books, a monthly stipend, and classes taught by experts, masters, and active practitioners of their respective fields among others.

==== Senior high school ====
Senior high school "completes" primary education by ensuring the graduate is equipped for work, entrepreneurship, or higher education. The old high school curriculum includes core classes and specialization classes based on student choice of specialization. Students may choose a field based on aptitude, interests, and school capacity. Classes or courses are divided into Core Curriculum Subjects and Track Subjects. All subjects (core, applied, and specialized) have 80 hours per semester each, except for Physical Education and Health, having 20 hours per semester.

The senior high school will be offered free in public schools. A voucher program will be in place for public junior high school completers and ESC beneficiaries of private high schools should they choose to take Senior High School in private institutions. This means that the burden of expenses for the additional two years should be borne only partially by parents. All grade 10 completers from a public junior high school who wish to enroll in a private senior high school will automatically get a voucher.

There are eight learning areas under the core curriculum: languages, humanities, communication, physical education, mathematics, philosophy, natural sciences and social sciences. These will make up 15 core courses with the same contents and competencies but with allowed contextualization based on the school's location despite specializations of tracks and strands. Track subjects will be divided into Applied or Contextualized and Specialization Subjects. There would be 7 Applied Subjects with competencies common to tracks and strands or specializations but with different contents based on specialization. There would be 9 Specialization Subjects with unique contents and competencies under a track or strand. Applied subjects include English for Academic and Professional Purposes, Practical Research 1, Practical Research 2, Pagsulat sa Filipino sa Piling Larangan (Akademik, Isports, Sining at Tech-Voc), Empowerment Technologies (for the Strand), Entrepreneurship and Inquiries, Investigations, and Immersion. Core subjects include Oral Communication, Reading and Writing, Komunikasyon at Pananaliksik sa Wika at Kulturang Pilipino, Pagbasa at Pagsuri ng Iba't-ibang Teksto Tungo sa Pananaliksik, 21st Century Literature from the Philippines and the World, Contemporary Philippine Arts from the Regions, Media and Information Literacy, General Mathematics, Statistics and Probability, Earth and Life Science, Physical Science, Personal Development, Understanding Culture, Politics, and Society, Introduction to Philosophy of the Human Person / Pambungad sa Pilosopiya ng Tao and Physical Education and Health

In June 2025, the Department of Education (DepEd) piloted a revamped SHS curriculum in 841 schools nationwide, reducing subject overload and focusing more on job readiness — with full rollout planned for 2026.

===== Tracks =====
For their specialization classes, students choose from four tracks: Academic; Technical-Vocational-Livelihood; Sports; and Arts and Design.

The Academic track includes five strands of specializations:

- Accountancy and Business Management (ABM) will prepare students for college courses in business-related careers such as accountancy, business management, business administration, office management, economics, or entrepreneurship.
- Humanities and Social Sciences (HUMSS) will prepare students for college courses in humanities like languages, mass communication and journalism, literature, philosophy, history, education, liberal arts, and the rest of the humanities and social sciences.
- Science and Technology, Engineering, and Mathematics (STEM) will prepare students for college courses in basic and applied sciences, biological sciences, physical sciences, laboratory sciences, nutrition and allied medicine, mathematics, and engineering.
- General Academic Strand (GAS) is a generic strand for students still deciding what to study in college or what track and strand to take, with the freedom to choose electives from any track or strand offered by the school.
- The new Pre-Baccalaureate Maritime Strand is an academic maritime field preparatory strand with pre-engineering courses like pre-calculus, calculus, and physics, as well as one chemistry and introductory maritime course, preparing students who wish to pursue higher education in a maritime-related field.

The Technical-Vocational-Livelihood (TVL) track includes five current specializations from which TESDA-based courses can be chosen: Home Economics, Agri-Fishery Arts, Industrial Arts, Information and Communications Technology, and TVL Maritime (a Technical-Vocational-Livelihood counterpart of the Pre-Baccalaureate Maritime of Academic Track). A mixture of specialization courses from these four fields can also be done, depending on the curricular program and schools offering the TVL track.

The Sports track will prepare students with sports science, sports-related, physical education-related, health-related, and movement-related courses. This will be with safety and first aid systems, fitness testing and basic exercise programming, psychosocial aspects of sports and exercise, and human movement. This track will prepare students for careers in sports athletics, fitness, training, recreational leadership, sports event management, coaching, and physical therapy.

The Arts and design track will prepare students for the creative industries in various creative and artistic fields, including but not limited to performing arts and visual arts. Students will be trained with lectures and immersions in art appreciation, production, and performing arts. They will also learn and be prepared with physical and personal development, integrating elements and principles of art and building cultural and national identity in arts. Students also will be immersed in an art field of their choice.

==== Vocational school ====
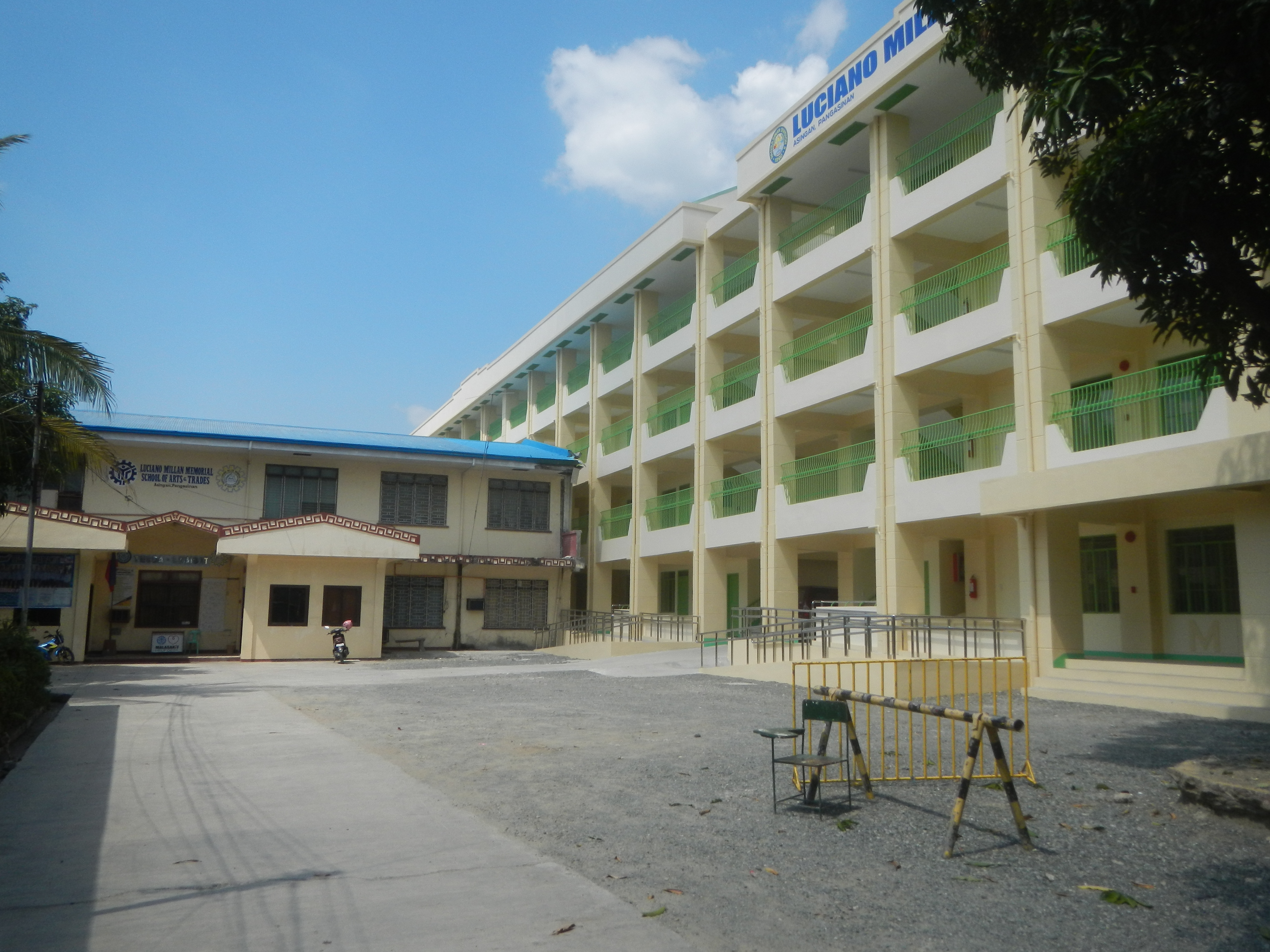
Luciano Millan Memorial School of Arts and Trades, a TESDA-accredited training center in Asingan, Pangasinan

Formal technical and vocational education starts in secondary education, with a two-year curriculum, which grants access to vocational tertiary education. However, non-formal technical and vocational education is also provided as alternative learning programs.

Vocational schools offer a higher concentration of technical and vocational subjects besides the core academic subjects studied by students at public high schools. These schools tend to offer technical and vocational instruction in one of five main fields: agriculture, fisheries, trade-technical, home industry, and 'non-traditional' courses while offering a host of specializations. Students study a general vocational area from the five main fields mentioned during the first two years. During the third and fourth years, they specialize in a discipline or vocation within that area. Programs contain a mixture of theory and practice.

Upon completing grade 10 of Junior High School, students can obtain Certificates of Competency (COC) or the vocationally oriented National Certificate Level I (NC I). After finishing a Technical-Vocational-Livelihood track in grade 12 of Senior High School, a student may obtain a National Certificate Level II (NC II), provided they pass the competency-based assessment administered by TESDA.

==== Science high schools ====
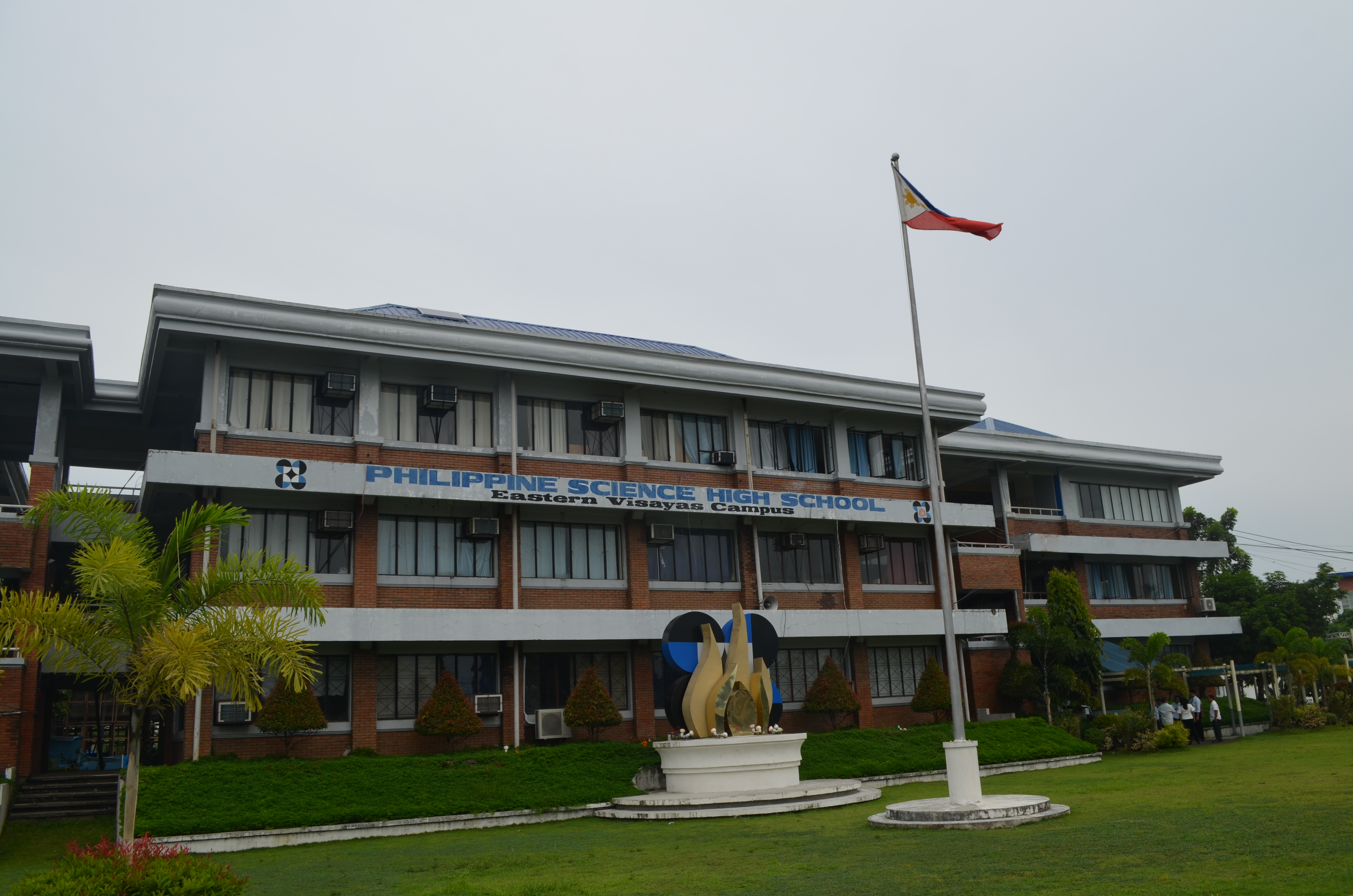
Philippine Science High School - Eastern Visayas Campus in March 2017

Science high schools are special schools for the more intellectually promising students to foster the problem-solving approach of critical thinking. As separate high schools, they have specific characteristics not found in regular high schools. However, any private or public high school can aspire to meet these minimum standards and be considered a science high school. These science schools are more exclusive and have higher standards than public high schools.

Precise science high schools like the Philippine Science High School System (PSHS) administered by Department of Science and Technology (DOST) and the RSHS System (RSHS) administered by the DepEd have biology, chemistry, and physics at every level or exclusive and advanced science and math subjects as subjects in technology, pre-engineering, and research. PSHS or RSHS students may transfer to a STEM program school but not the way around. PSHS students may assign to an RSHS and vice versa only for the incoming sophomore year. PSHS and RSHS students must maintain an average grade, especially in their advanced sciences and math subjects, on a quarterly basis or continue their education in these schools.

Students who completed at least four years of secondary education under the 1945–2017 K–10 system were awarded a Diploma (Katibayan) and a secondary school Certificate of Graduation (Katunayan) from the DepEd. Students are also granted a Permanent Record or Form 137-A, listing all classes taken and grades earned. Under the current 2008 K–12 system, the permanent record will be issued after the completion of senior high school.

=== Other types of schools ===
Aside from the general public school, other types of schools exist: private schools, preparatory schools, international schools, laboratory high schools, and science high schools. Several foreign ethnic groups operate their schools, including Chinese, British, Singaporeans, Americans, Koreans, and Japanese.

==== Chinese schools ====
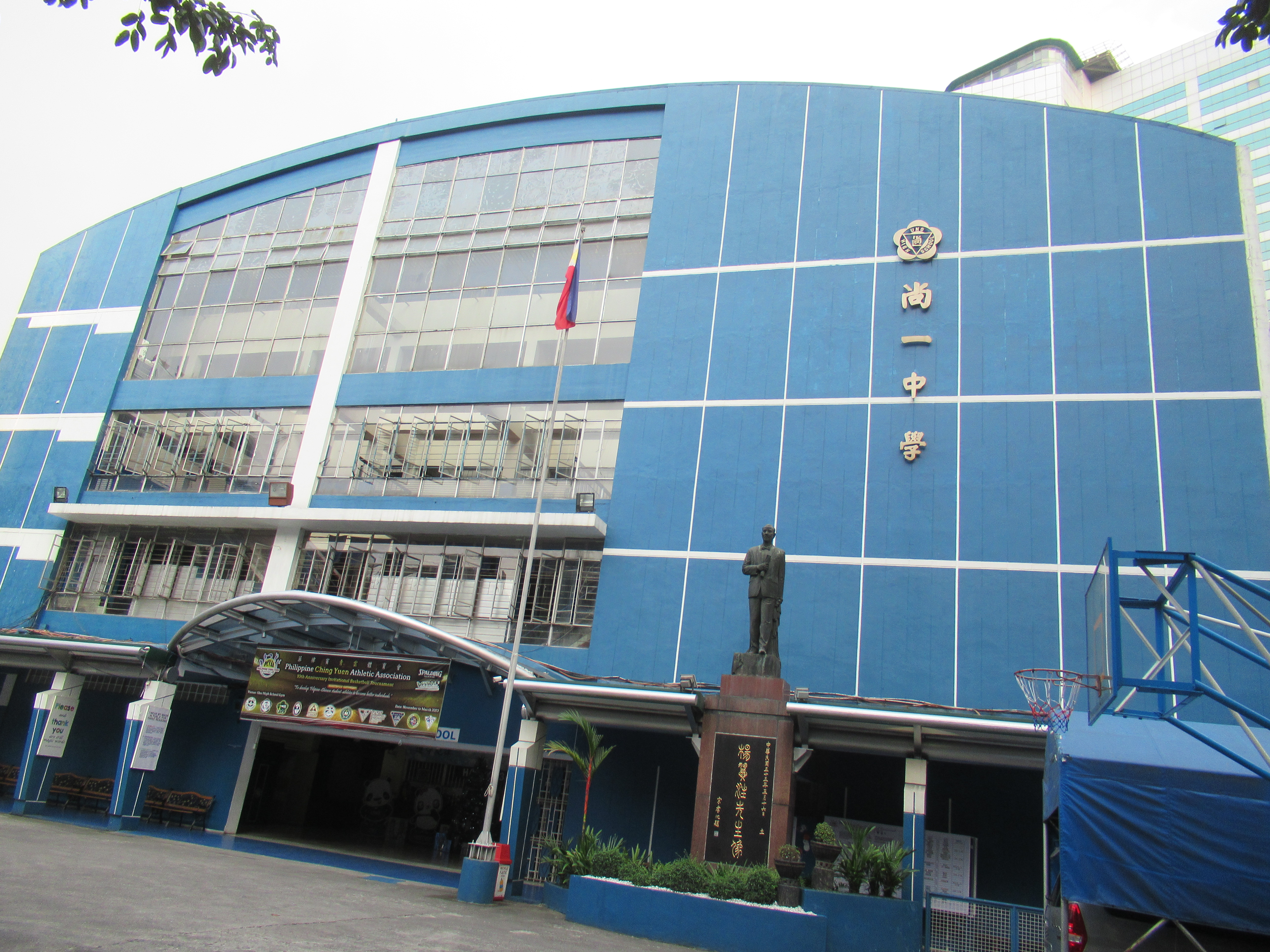
A Chinese high school in Manila

Chinese schools add two subjects to the core curriculum: Chinese communication arts and literature. Some schools add Chinese history, philosophy and culture, and Chinese mathematics. Other Chinese schools, called cultural schools, offer Confucian classics and Chinese art as part of their curriculum. Religion also plays an integral role in the curriculum. American evangelists founded some Chinese schools, while some have Catholic roots.

==== Islamic schools ====
In 2004, the Department of Education adopted Department Order No. 51, including Arabic Language and Islamic Values in the standard curriculum for Muslim children in public schools. The same order authorized the implementation of the Standard Madrasa Curriculum (SMC) in the private madaris. The SMC combines the RBEC subjects (English, Filipino, Science, Math, and Makabayan) and the teaching of Arabic and Islamic studies. Islamic schools have a separate subject for Arabic Language and Islamic Values (ALIVE). Arabic is taught in Islamic schools.

While there have been recognized Islamic schools—i.e., Ibn Siena Integrated School (Marawi), Sarang Bangun LC (Zamboanga), and Southwestern Mindanao Islamic Institute (Jolo)—their Islamic studies curriculum varies. With the Department of Education-authorized SMC, the subject offering is uniform across these private madaris.

Since 2005, the AusAID-funded Department of Education project Basic Education Assistance for Mindanao (BEAM) has assisted a group of private madaris seeking government permits to operate (PTO) and implement the SMC.

=== School year and class hours ===
Until 2020 the academic year in basic education centers usually ran from June to March, with an intervening semestral break at the last week of October (around All Saints' Day). By law, the school year can begin as early as June or as late as August. In 2020, owing to the COVID pandemic, the school year moved for the first time to a shorter term beginning October 2020 and ending in June 2021. The 2021-22 calendar finally returned to the dates mentioned by law with August 2021 as its opening, bringing the year in line with the university academic calendar. As of 2025, public schools and private schools that opted will transition to the school calendar returning to June as its opening. In April 2026, DepEd implements a three-term school calendar in basic education, starting by SY 2026–2027.

There are two major school breaks: a semestral break from the last week of October to the first week of November including All Saints Day, and a two-week school break at the 3rd and last weeks of December around Christmas and New Year's Day (including Rizal Day). Other national school holidays are for Independence Day (June 12), Ninoy Aquino Day (August 21), National Heroes Day (last Monday of August), Bonifacio Day (November 30), Feast of the Immaculate Conception (December 8), Chinese New Year and People Power Day (February 25). The Muslim holidays Eid'l Fitr and Eid'l Adha are also national school holidays when they fall anywhere within the school year. With the switch of the calendar, Holy Week was added in 2021 to the school holidays list, lasting a whole week or just the Easter Triduum at the minimum. Schools may also have additional holidays at the provincial, city and municipal levels.

Students are required to go to school for five days (Monday to Friday). School days in most public schools are a daytime affair of 7am-5pm inclusive of flag ceremonies, breaks (commonly called 'recess') and lunch (12nn-1pm). However, in quite populated areas and/or public schools and some of the major private schools, it is usually divided into morning and afternoon shifts - the former usually beginning 6:00 am and ending at noon, and the latter from noon to 6:00 pm. In worse cases of congestion, schools may add a mid-day shift to alleviate classroom overcrowding.

=== Uniforms ===
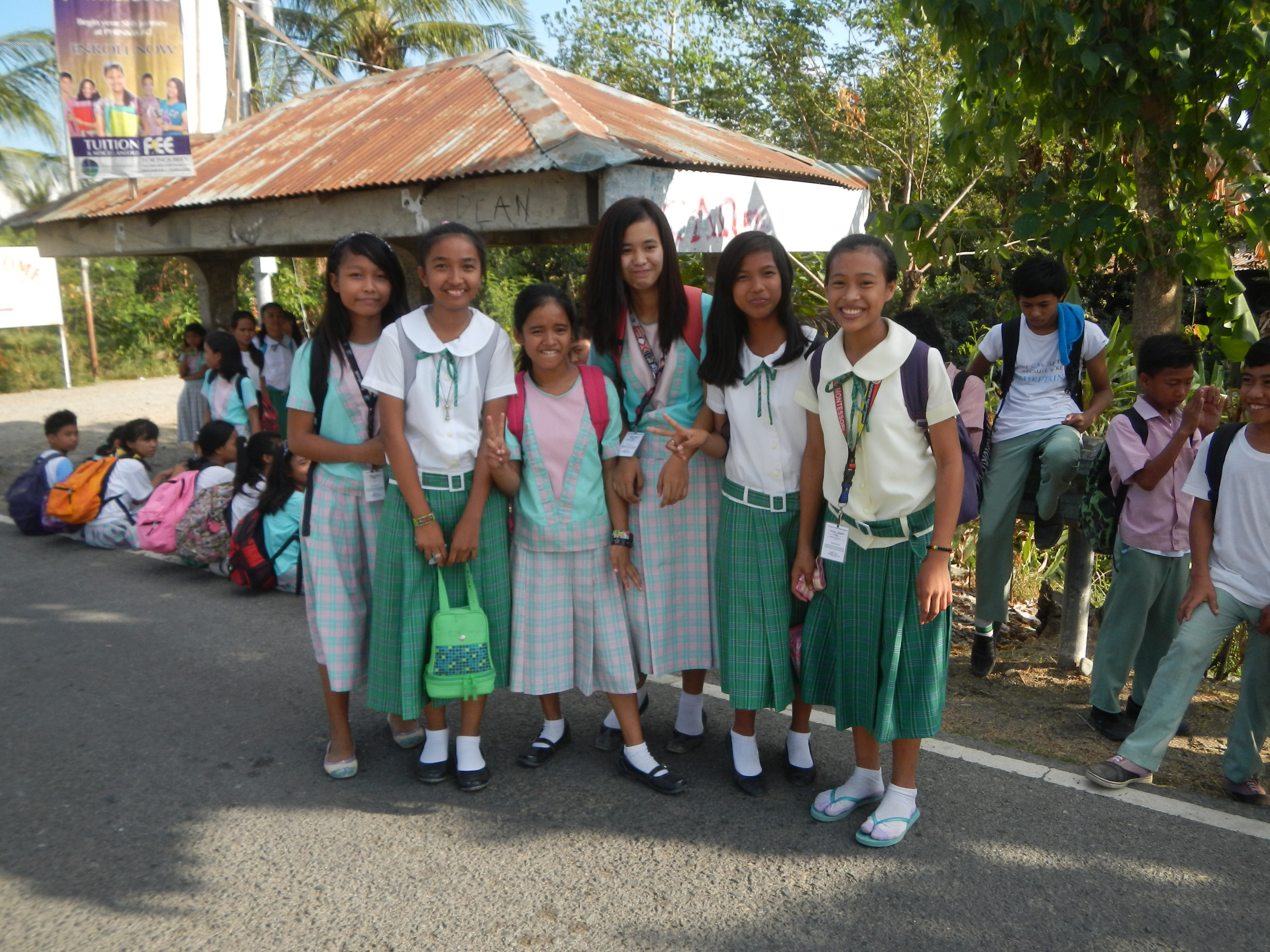
Female students in school uniform at Licab, Nueva Ecija

Filipino students at both public and private schools usually wear school uniforms, designated by each individual school. Mandatory school uniforms at public schools were abolished in 2008 under President Gloria Macapagal Arroyo's orders.

Boys usually wear a collared shirt with pants or shorts (usually up to elementary level), and black leather shoes and white socks. Girls usually wear a collared blouse, with or without a necktie or ribbon, a calf-length skirt or jumper dress, and black shoes and white socks. Colors used usually vary by school, but usually match school colors, and most uniforms incorporate the school's seal, crest or logo. Students also wear Scouting and physical education (PE) uniforms at designated days each week, students of secondary schools and higher learning institutions with CAT (Citizen's Advancement Training) or National Service Training Program memberships may wear the uniform of their chosen track. Schools may also prohibit students from wearing make-up, jewelry or certain hairstyles.

== Higher education ==
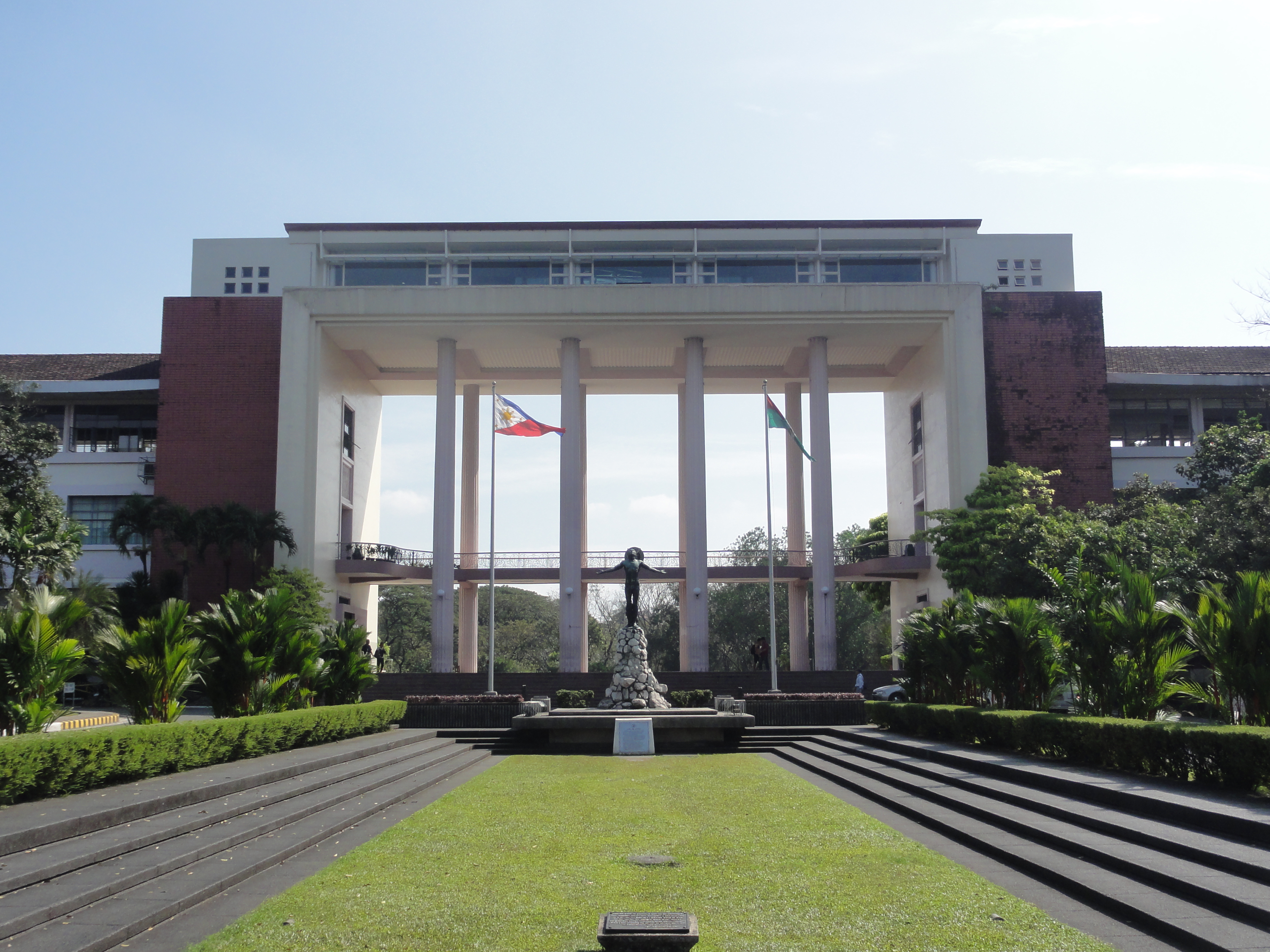
The Diliman campus of University of the Philippines, the country's national state university, in Quezon City

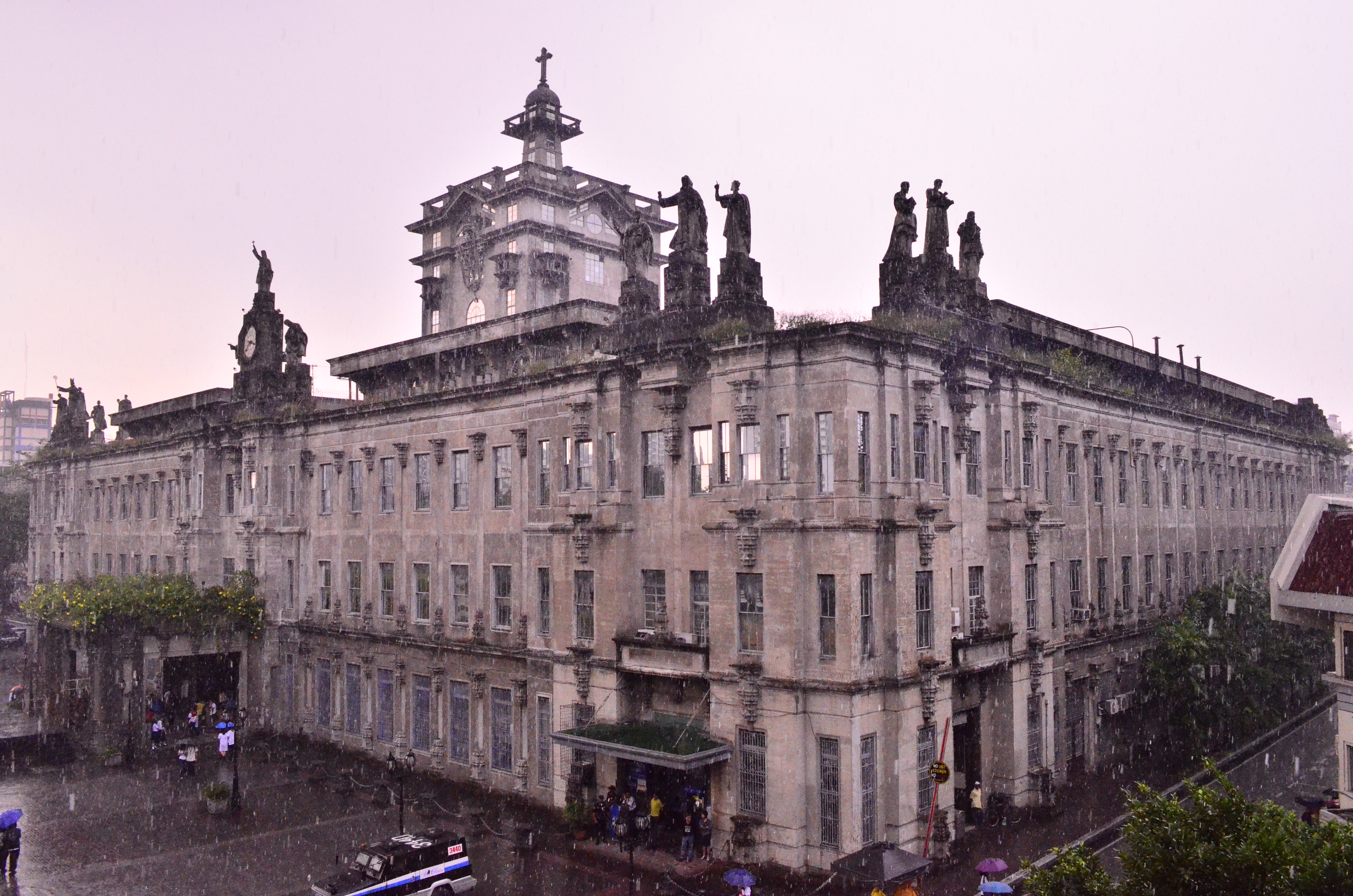
University of Santo Tomas, a private Catholic university in Manila

Tertiary education matters are outside the jurisdiction of DepEd and are instead governed by the Commission on Higher Education (CHED). As of 2020, there are over 1,975 higher education institutions (HEIs) in the country (excluding satellite campuses of state universities and colleges), classified into public and private institutions. There are 246 public higher education institutions which account for 12% of all HEIs; private institutions number at 1,729, accounting for 88% of all HEIs.

Public HEIs are further divided into state universities and colleges (SUCs), local colleges and universities (LUCs), and Other Government Schools (further composed of OGS, CSI [CHED Supervised Institution], and Special HEIs). SUCs are administered and financed by the national government as the Philippine Congress determines. LUCs are funded and established through ordinances and resolutions by local government units governing its area. Special HEIs, such as the Philippine Military Academy, offer programs related to public service and are administered through the use of specific laws that were created for them. Finally, government schools are public secondary and post-secondary technical-vocational education institutions that offer higher education programs.

Private HEIs are established and governed by special provisions by a Corporation Code and are classified as sectarian and non-sectarian. Sectarian HEIs are non-profit institutions owned and operated by religious organizations. Non-sectarian institutions are owned and operated by private entities that have no affiliation with religious organizations. Of the 1,729 institutions as of the Academic Year 2019–2020, 356 (21%) are sectarian, and 1,373 (79%) are non-sectarian.

According to CHED statistics, there were 17,202 foreign nationals studying in various HEIs in the Philippines as of Academic Year 2022–2023. Indians ranked first, with 8,973 students; the rest included Chinese (5,334), and Nigerians (838).

Secondary students used to sit for the National Secondary Achievement Test (NSAT), based on the American SAT and administered by the DepEd. Like its primary school counterpart, NSAT was phased out in November 2001 after significant reorganizations in the education department. Its successors, the National Career Assessment Examination (NCAE) (since 2006) and National Achievement Test (NAT) were administered to 3rd and 4th Year students, respectively, before the implementation of the K–12 system. The National Career Assessment Examination (NCAE) is now being distributed for grade 9, and the National Achievement Test (NAT) is being administered for grades 3, 6, 10, and 12. Neither the NSAT nor NAT has been used as a basis for being offered admission to higher education institutions, partly because pupils sit them at almost the end of their secondary education; instead, HEIs, both public and private, administer their own entrance examinations. Vocational colleges usually do not have entrance examinations.

== Alternative Learning System ==
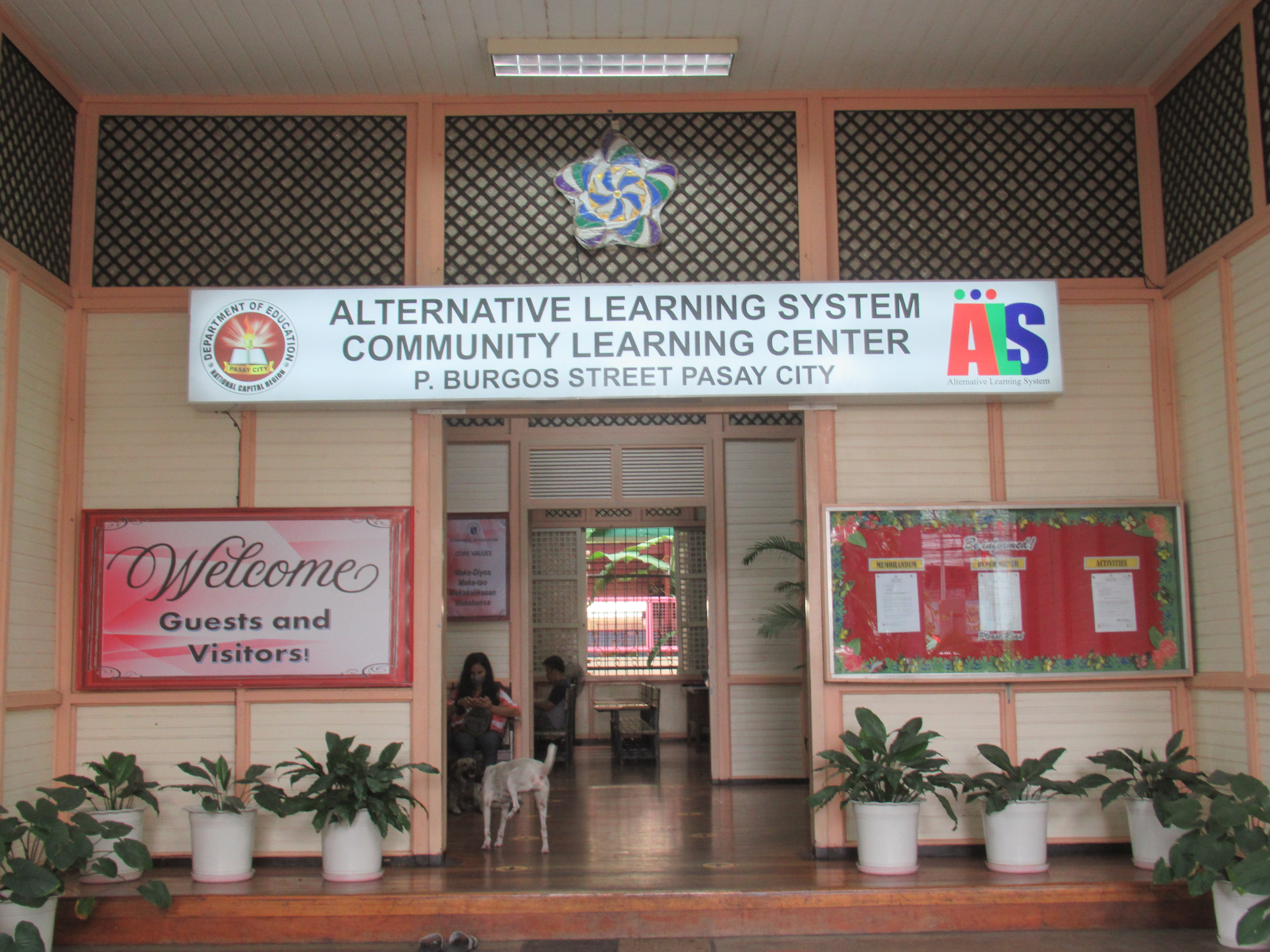
An ALS learning center in Pasay

The Alternative Learning System (ALS) in the Philippines caters to the needs of those unable to access formal education or those that have yet to receive proper instruction from traditional education institutions for various reasons. According to DepEd, ALS is a laddered and modular non-formal education program for dropouts in elementary and secondary schools. The program enables students to attend classes according to their desired timetables.

Although similar to formal teaching institutions, there will be a diagnostic test for any student to gauge their skill level needed per grade level. If a student needs to gain essential skills, such as reading and writing, an additional program is offered to help them learn the basics before taking the diagnostic test; a specific number of hours is required of the student to finish the program. There will be a final assessment to test the student's comprehensive knowledge. If the student passes, they will be given a certificate signed by the DepEd secretary, allowing them to apply for college degrees, work, and formal training programs. The student can re-enroll in elementary/secondary education in formal teaching institutions.

Non-formal technical and vocational education (such as centre-based programs, community-based programs and enterprise-based training, or the Alternative Learning System (ALS)) is assumed by institutions usually accredited by TESDA. These institutions may be government operated, often by a local government, or run by private organizations. They may offer programs ranging from a couple of weeks to two-year diploma courses. Upon graduating from most of these courses, students take an examination from TESDA to obtain the relevant certificate or diploma.

=== Indigenous peoples' schools ===
The 1987 Philippine Constitution provides for recognizing and promoting indigenous learning systems under Article XIV, Section 2, Paragraph 1.

The national education policy framework for indigenous peoples was signed in 2011 by the DepEd to help promote the rights of Philippine indigenous peoples. The framework directs the DepEd, the National Commission on Indigenous Peoples, National Commission for Culture and the Arts, and other government agencies to provide adequate and culturally relevant learning to Philippine indigenous peoples. Government agencies are also tasked to develop textbooks and other learning materials. The Mother Tongue-Based Multilingual Education supports the National Indigenous Peoples Education Policy Framework as a priority program to help sustain cultural traditions and knowledge.

=== Special education (SPED) schools ===
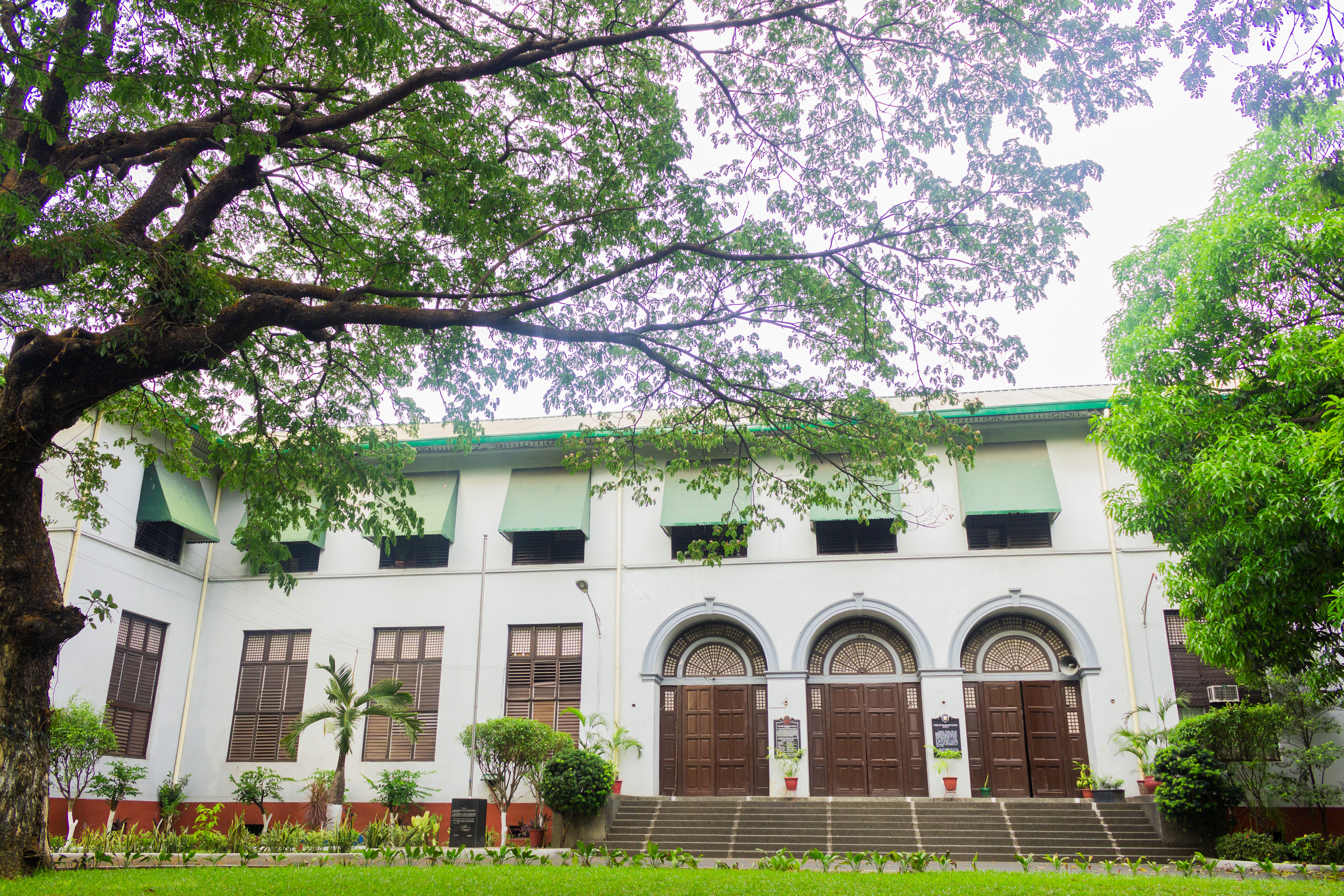
The Philippine School for the Deaf in Pasay, established in 1907, is the pioneer institution for special education in the Philippines and Asia.

Special education schools in the Philippines provide learning instructions for children with intellectual disabilities, as well as those with visual, hearing, and physical disabilities.

== Teachers ==
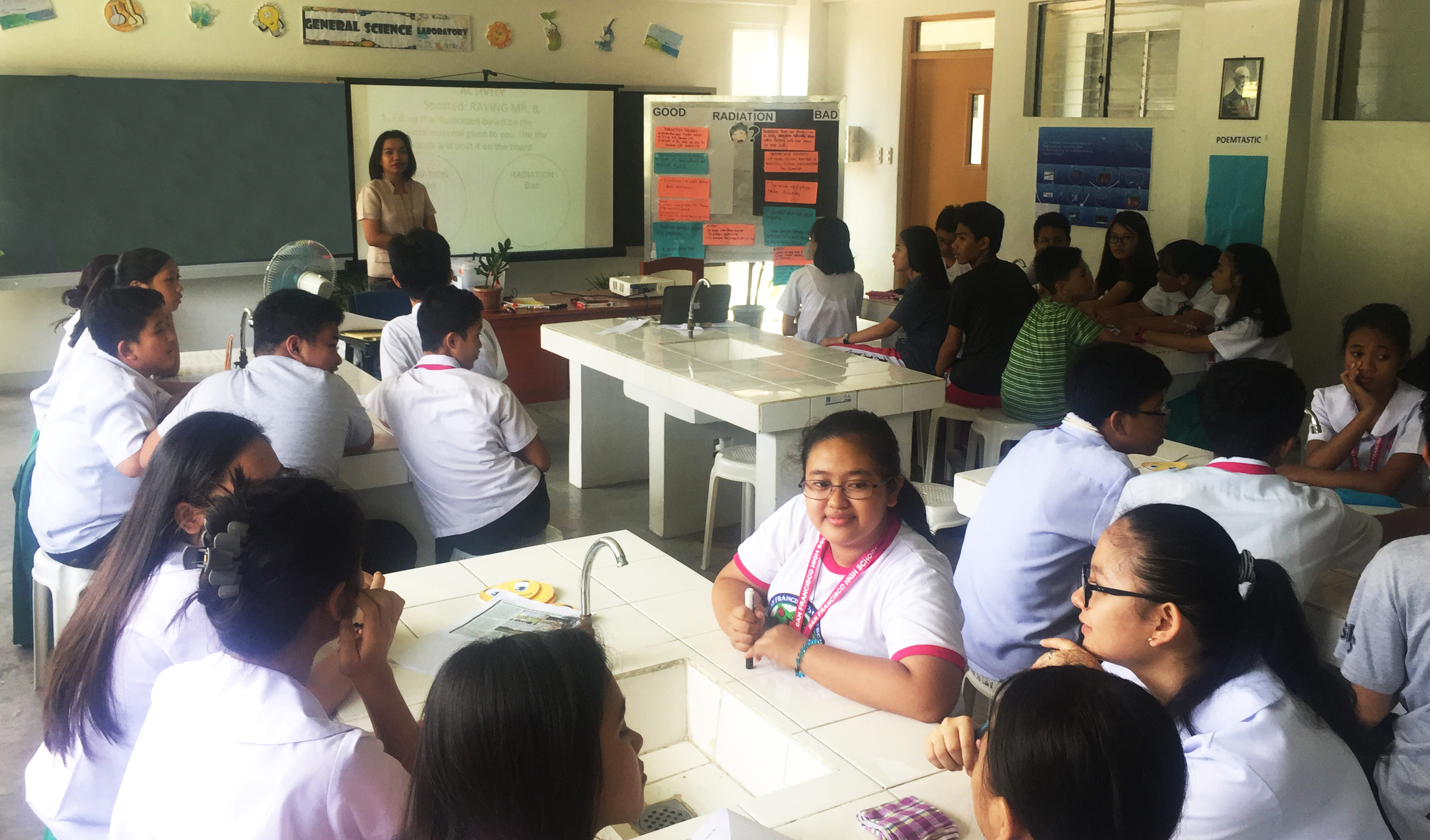
A Grade 9 Science teacher

There are 876,842 public school teachers in the Philippines as of 2021. The teacher-learner ratio in Philippine public schools in 2020 was 1:28 in public elementary schools, 1:25 in junior high school, and 1:29 in senior high school. There are 500,000 teaching and non-teaching staff members in private schools as of 2022. The Department of Education said that the Philippines faced a shortage of 30,000 teachers in 2025.

The starting pay for public school teachers in the Philippines is ₱20,754 monthly. As many as 92% of public school teachers receive a monthly salary of ₱25,000 to ₱30,000. Some private school teachers are paid ₱6,000 monthly. There are pending bills in Congress proposing salary increases for public school teachers, citing how teachers tend to be underpaid, overworked, and subjected to poor working conditions.

To improve the quality of teachers' education in the country, in April 2022, President Rodrigo Duterte signed Republic Act No. 11713. The law mandated the establishment of a scholarship program for aspiring education students; enhancing the Teacher Education Council; and designation of at least one teacher education institution, recognized by the Commission on Higher Education, as Center of Excellence in Special Needs Education in each of three island groups and three metropolitan areas in the country.

On June 3, 2024, President Bongbong Marcos signed Republic Act No. 11997, granting an initial teacher's ₱5,000 teaching allowance, previously known as "chalk allowance", for academic year 2024–2025, followed by ₱10,000 for School Year 2025–2026.

Teachers have conducted campaigns and protest actions to call for higher wages and better working conditions. In 2026, the Alliance of Concerned Teachers (ACT) criticized the ₱85-increase in the daily minimum wage as "grossly inadequate", noting the high cost of living given the rise in food, transport, housing prices.

=== Quality of teacher education ===
There is a need to improve teaching method as in there are overcrowded classrooms in the country, teachers should also be assigned in classes on which they are a subject-matter expert, and the below-average passing rates in Licensure Examination for Teachers (LET) is need to be improved as it has been identified as major issues in the country's educational system. Elementary teacher LET from 2014 to 2019 revealed an average passing rate of only 28 percent, while secondary teacher LET showed an average passing rate of 36 percent.

A 2021 World Bank report showed that learning poverty in the Philippines was linked to most teachers in the Philippines using ineffective teaching practices, teachers' lack of mastery, as well as teacher absenteeism.

== Students ==
More than 27.2 million students are enrolled in 2021, 23.9 million of whom are in public schools. An estimated 2 million students aged 16 to 18 were not attending schools as of 2023.

=== Affordability ===
Affordability has been identified as a factor affecting educational access in the Philippines. While public education is officially free at primary and secondary levels, associated costs such as school supplies, transportation, and informal fees may present financial barriers. These costs have been linked to higher drop-out rates among disadvantaged populations.

In higher education, cost recovery, referring to the portion of educational expenses paid by students and families before realizing returns through employment, has placed additional financial strain on students. In the early 2000s, cost recovery rates in Philippine higher education was estimated to be as high as 85%, one of the highest in Asia, raising concerns about equitable access. In response, non-governmental organizations (NGOs) and donor-supported scholarship programs have provided financial aid to alleviate affordability challenges.

=== Education-employment mismatch ===
A disconnect between post-secondary education programs and the domestic labor market needs has contributed to underemployment and the emigration of skilled graduates from the Philippines. This education-labor mismatch has been linked to persistent brain drain in sectors such as healthcare, raising concerns about the alignment of tertiary education with national development priorities.

Studies note that Philippine higher education institutions were producing an oversupply of graduates in fields like business, engineering, and arts, while failing to meet national demand in vocational-technical specializations, mathematics, chemistry, and physics during the 1960s to 1980s. This mismatch has led to situations were graduates are unemployed or working abroad in roles not reflective of their education, further deepening the loss of skilled labor domestically.

== Classrooms ==
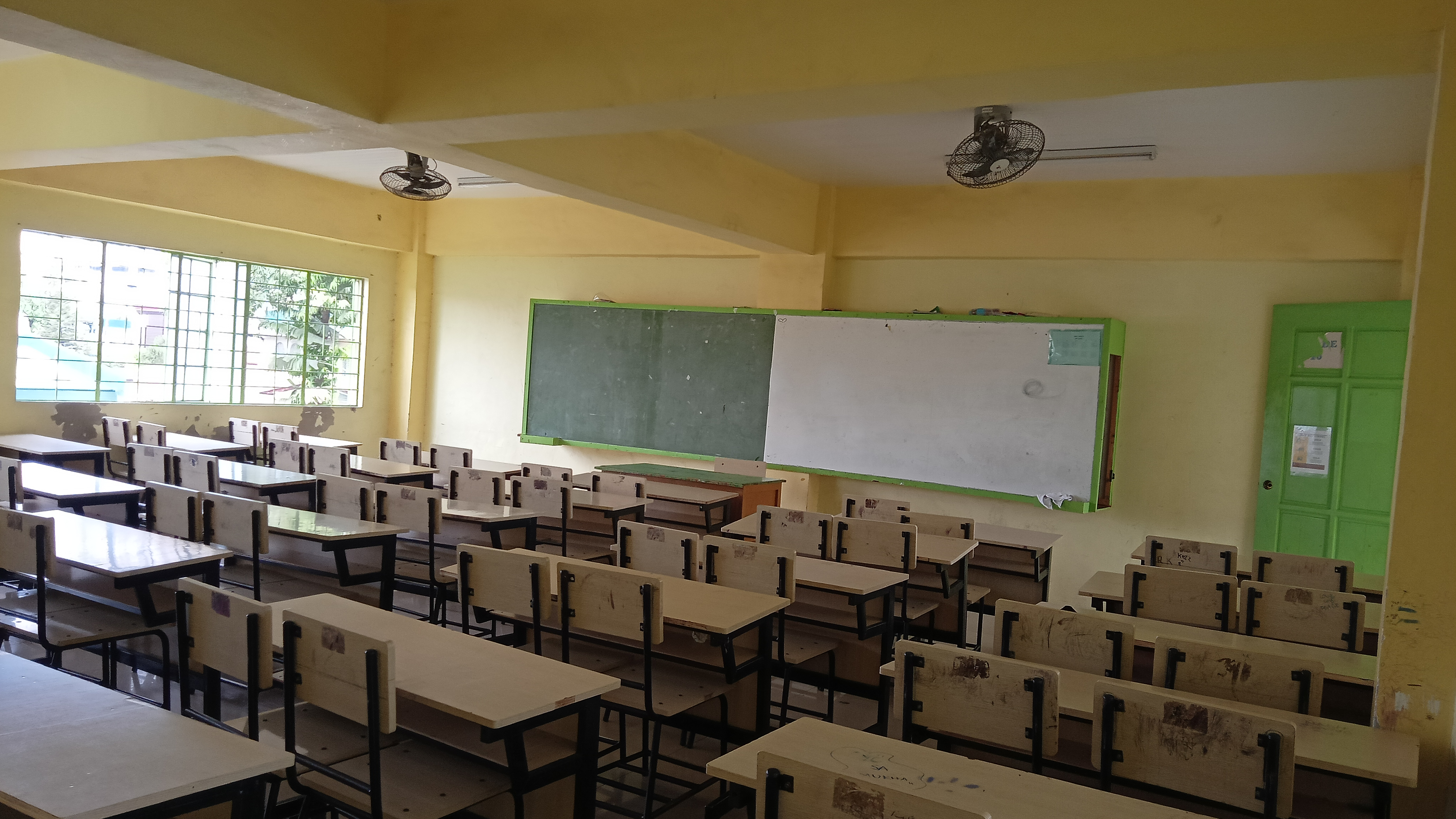
A public school classroom in Pasay

As of 2023, there are 327,851 school buildings in the country, 104,536 of which are in good condition. The 2019 National School Building Inventory reported a shortage of 167,901 classrooms in the country. The Senate Committee on basic education estimates that ₱420 billion is needed to build classrooms for the country's education system.

=== Lack of classrooms ===
According to the Department of Education, the Philippines has a shortage of 148,000 classrooms as of 2025. The department said that the shortage has been the result of red tape and corruption in government as well as overpricing by private contractors.

During the 2025 flood control projects corruption scandal in the Philippines, the Department of Education ordered an audit of school infrastructure projects around the country. The audit reported that 1,000 classrooms built by the Department of Public Works and Highways were left incomplete and unusable.

== Academic freedom ==
Academic freedom is protected by the 1987 Philippine Constitution, which states in Article XIV, Section 5 (2), "Academic freedom shall be enjoyed in all institutions of higher learning". Philippine Supreme Court Justice Estela Perlas-Bernabe wrote that "Academic freedom is anchored on the recognition that academic institutions perform a social function, and its business is conducted for the common good; that is, it is a necessary tool for critical inquiry of truth and its free exposition. Thus, the guarantee of academic freedom is complementary to the freedom of expression and the freedom of the mind."

Republic Act 8292 (Higher Education Modernization Act of 1997) states that "all institutions of higher learning, public or private, shall enjoy academic freedom and institutional autonomy". Implementing rules for this law state that "all SUCs shall enjoy academic freedom and institutional autonomy". Academic freedom is also enshrined in Republic Act 9500 (The University of the Philippines Charter of 2008), which states, "the national university has the right and responsibility to exercise academic freedom".

Threats to academic freedom include attempts to establish a military presence in campuses or corporations dictating that a school teach only "marketable courses". Other threats may come in the form of state-sponsored historical distortion and the red-tagging, surveillance, and harassment of students and faculty. In Freedom House's 2025 Academic Freedom Index, the Philippines scored 0.624 (out of 1, 1 is best), the country's lowest score in nearly 40 years.

=== Press freedom ===
Republic Act 7079 (Campus Journalism Act of 1991) protects the freedom of the campus press and aims to help develop "moral character and personal discipline of the Filipino youth" through the campus press. According to the College Editors Guild of the Philippines, there were 206 violations of campus press freedom from 2023 to 2024, including censorship, government surveillance, and withholding of funds.

== Issues ==
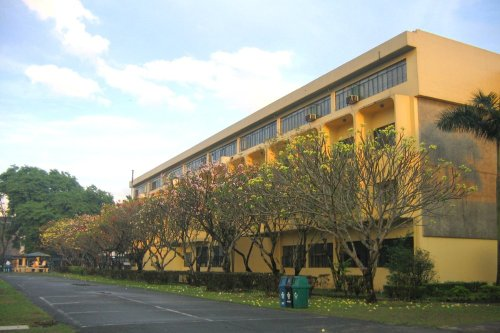
PSHS Main Campus. There is a disparity between rural and urban education facilities in the Philippines.

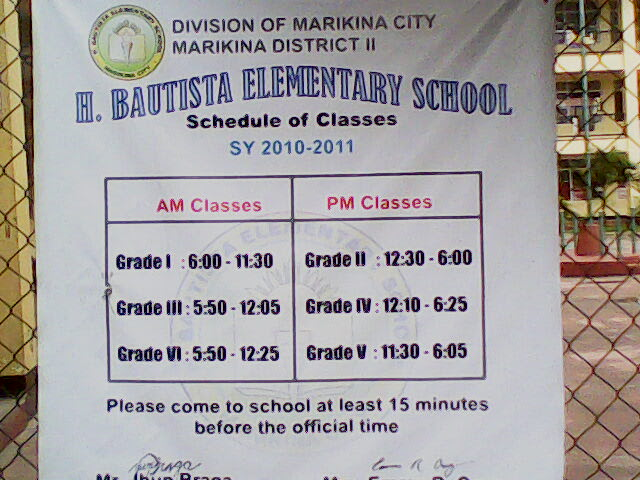
Signage showing the different shifts for students in a school in Marikina. Some schools implement shifts in class schedules to compensate for inadequate school buildings, teachers, and materials.

The Philippine education system struggles with policy implementation, and many government schools need more classroom space, textbooks, desks and learning equipment, such as libraries, computers and science laboratories. Most government schools with large class sizes run in two or three shifts. A local context of political and socio-religious tensions and a high rate of school principal turnover compound these bureaucratic weaknesses.

According to the Human Rights Measurement Initiative (HRMI), the Philippines is fulfilling 79.0% of its obligations for the right to education relative to its income level. The report indicates that the country is meeting 87.8% of expected outcomes for primary education, but only 70.2% for secondary education.

=== Inadequate funding ===
According to the 2023 Philippine development plan, poor educational outcomes have been caused by "decades of incapacity and suboptimal investment in education." Government think tank Philippine Institute for Development Studies (PIDS) said that the country has not been spending enough to improve education.

PIDS linked underinvestment in education—including inadequate funding for classroom construction and maintenance, teachers' salaries, teacher training, and teaching materials—to the poor performance of students.

The Department of Education has proposed a budget of ₱758.6 billion for 2024, an increase of ₱36.8 billion. The increase is only 39% of the increase the department received in 2022–2023. The Philippine High School for the Arts, the National Museum, and other agencies under the Department of Education will be subject to substantial budget cuts under the proposed budget.

The Alliance of Concerned Teachers called for setting targets for addressing classroom shortages and proposed raising the salary grade of public school teachers.

=== Corruption ===
In 2022, during the Presidency of Rodrigo Duterte, Senate blue ribbon committee recommended the filing of criminal and administrative charges against Department of Education executives over laptops overpriced by at least P979 million. Former Secretary of Education Leonor Briones was charged with graft and corruption before the Ombudsman in 2025. In a separate incident, the Department of Education bought P667-million worth of laptops that were never received by public school teachers but were instead resold in retail stores and on Facebook.

At an anti-corruption rally in January 2025, protesters said that the cutting of the education budget by P12-billion affects teachers, who have to use their own money to pay for instructional materials and to help students who cannot pay for school supplies or snacks.

In 2025, Vice President Sara Duterte was impeached by the House of Representatives over multiple charges, including allegations of malversation of ₱612.5 million in confidential funds under the Office of the Vice President and the Department of Education, bribery, and unexplained wealth. The House of Representatives also recommended the filing of criminal charges, including perjury, corruption, and plunder, against Sara Duterte.

=== Poor learning outcomes ===
The Programme for International Student Assessment conducted by the Organisation for Economic Co-operation and Development in 2018 showed that 15-year-old students in the Philippines scored lower in mathematics, science, and reading compared to students from other countries that participated in the survey.

The State of Global Learning Poverty 2022 Update rated the Philippines' learning poverty at 90.9% for the year 2019, calculated through assessing Grade 5 students ratings in subjects of reading, writing, mathematics, and global citizenship.

== See also ==
Main links

- Distance e-Learning in the Philippines
- Higher education in the Philippines
- List of universities and colleges in the Philippines
- List of Catholic universities and colleges in the Philippines
- List of the oldest schools in the Philippines
- Aiducation

Categories

- Category:Filipino educators
- Category:Medical schools in the Philippines
- Category:Graduate schools in the Philippines
- Category:Law schools in the Philippines
- Category:Liberal arts colleges in the Philippines
- Category:Business schools in the Philippines
- Category:Private universities and colleges in the Philippines
- Category:Military education and training in the Philippines
