= Notre Dame High School =

Notre Dame High School or Notre Dame Academy or variations are the name of numerous high (secondary) schools and other academies:

== Australia ==
- Notre Dame College, Shepparton, Victoria

== Bangladesh ==
- Notre Dame College, Dhaka, a higher secondary degree college affiliated to the National University
- Notre Dame College Mymensingh, a higher secondary college in Mymensingh

== Canada ==
- Athol Murray College of Notre Dame, Wilcox, Saskatchewan
- Collège Notre-Dame (Sudbury), Ontario
- Collège Notre-Dame du Sacré-Cœur, Montreal, Quebec
- Notre Dame Catholic Secondary School (Ajax), Ontario
- Notre Dame Catholic Secondary School (Brampton), Ontario
- Notre Dame Catholic Secondary School (Burlington), Ontario
- Notre Dame College School, Welland, Ontario
- Notre Dame High School (Calgary), Alberta
- Notre Dame High School (Ottawa), Ontario
- Notre Dame High School (Toronto), Ontario
- Notre Dame Regional Secondary School, Vancouver, British Columbia

== France ==
- Notre-Dame International High School, Verneuil-sur-Seine

== Ghana ==
- Notre Dame High School (Ghana), Fiapre, Brong-Ahafo Region

== Haiti ==
- Collège Notre-Dame (Haiti), Cap-Haïtien

== India ==
- Notre Dame Academy, Patna

== Philippines ==
- Notre Dame Educational Association, a network of Notre Dame Schools including both secondary and tertiary institutions
- Notre Dame of Dadiangas University, General Santos City, South Cotabato
- Notre Dame of Marbel University, Koronadal City, South Cotabato
- Notre Dame of Midsayap College, Midsayap, North Cotabato
- Notre Dame University (Philippines), Cotabato City, Maguindanao
- Notre Dame of Cotabato, Inc., Cotabato City, Maguindanao
- Notre Dame – RVM College of Cotabato, Cotabato City, Maguindanao
- Notre Dame of Kidapawan College, Kidapawan City, North Cotabato
- Notre Dame of Isulan, Isulan, Sultan Kudarat

== United Kingdom ==
- Lingfield College, Lingfield, Surrey, England
- Notre Dame Catholic College (Liverpool), Lancashire, England
- Notre Dame Catholic School, Plymouth, Devon, England
- Notre Dame Catholic Sixth Form College, Leeds, Yorkshire, England
- Notre Dame High School, Glasgow, Scotland
- Notre Dame High School, Greenock, Scotland
- Notre Dame High School (Norwich), Norfolk, England
- Notre Dame High School (Sheffield), Yorkshire, England
- Notre Dame School, Cobham, Surrey, England
- Notre Dame Roman Catholic Girls' School, London, England

== United States ==
- Notre Dame Preparatory High School (Arizona)
- Notre Dame Academy (Los Angeles, California)
- Notre Dame High School (Belmont, California)
- Notre Dame High School (Riverside, California)
- Notre Dame High School (Salinas, California)
- Notre Dame High School (San Jose, California)
- Notre Dame High School (Sherman Oaks, California)
- Notre Dame Catholic High School (Connecticut) (Fairfield)
- Notre Dame High School (West Haven, Connecticut)
- Notre Dame Academy (Miami, Florida), merged in 1981 into Archbishop Curley-Notre Dame High School
- Notre Dame Academy (Georgia), Duluth, Georgia
- Notre Dame High School for Girls, Chicago, Illinois, closed in 2016
- Notre Dame College Prep, Niles, Illinois, formerly Notre Dame High School for Boys
- Peoria Notre Dame High School, Peoria, Illinois
- Quincy Notre Dame High School, Quincy, Illinois
- Notre Dame High School (Burlington, Iowa)
- Notre Dame Academy (Park Hills, Kentucky)
- Notre Dame High School (Crowley, Louisiana)
- Institute of Notre Dame, Baltimore, Maryland
- Notre Dame Preparatory School (Towson, Maryland)
- Notre Dame Preparatory School (Fitchburg, Massachusetts)
- Notre Dame Academy (Hingham, Massachusetts)
- Notre Dame Cristo Rey High School, Methuen, Massachusetts
- Notre Dame Academy (Worcester, Massachusetts)
- Notre Dame High School (Harper Woods, Michigan) (closed in 2005)
- Notre Dame Preparatory (Pontiac, Michigan)
- Notre Dame High School (Biloxi, Mississippi): see Mercy Cross High School (Biloxi, Mississippi)
- Notre Dame High School (Cape Girardeau, Missouri)
- Notre Dame High School (St. Louis), Missouri
- Notre Dame High School (New Jersey) (Lawrenceville)
- Notre Dame High School (Batavia, New York)
- Notre Dame High School (Elmira, New York)
- Notre Dame School (Manhattan), New York, New York
- Notre Dame Academy (Staten Island), New York, New York
- Notre Dame Junior Senior High School (Utica, New York)
- Notre Dame-Cathedral Latin School, Chardon, Ohio
- Notre Dame High School (Hamilton, Ohio)
- Notre Dame High School (Portsmouth, Ohio)
- Notre Dame Academy (Toledo, Ohio)
- Notre Dame High School (East Stroudsburg, Pennsylvania)
- Notre Dame High School (Easton, Pennsylvania), Easton, Pennsylvania
- Notre Dame Academy, Mitchell, South Dakota, of NRHP-listed Holy Family Church, School, and Rectory
- Notre Dame High School (Chattanooga, Tennessee)
- Notre Dame School of Dallas, Texas
- Notre Dame Catholic School (Wichita Falls, Texas)
- Notre Dame Academy (Middleburg, Virginia) (became Middleburg Academy in 2010)
- Notre Dame High School (Clarksburg, West Virginia)
- Notre Dame Academy (Green Bay, Wisconsin)

=== Guam ===
- Notre Dame High School (Guam), Talofofo

=== Puerto Rico ===
- Colegio Católico Notre Dame, Caguas

== See also ==
- Notre Dame (disambiguation)
- Our Lady (disambiguation)
