= Notre Dame =

Notre Dame, French for "Our Lady", a title of Mary, mother of Jesus, most commonly refers to:

- Notre-Dame de Paris, a cathedral in Paris, France
- University of Notre Dame, a university in Indiana, US

Notre Dame may also refer to:

== Churches and cathedrals ==
=== Algeria ===
- Notre-Dame d'Afrique, Algiers

=== Cambodia ===
- Notre Dame Cathedral (Phnom Penh)

=== Canada ===
- Camp Val Notre-Dame, a recreational camp in Hérouxville, Mékinac Regional County Municipality, Mauricie, Quebec
- Notre-Dame Basilica (Montreal), in the historic district of Old Montreal
  - Notre-Dame Church (Montreal) (1682–1830), historically in Old Montreal
- Notre-Dame Basilica-Cathedral (Quebec City), the primate church of Canada
- Notre-Dame Cathedral Basilica (Ottawa), an ecclesiastic basilica
- Notre-Dame-de-Bon-Secours Chapel, Montreal
- Notre Dame Convent and Boarding School, also known as Leipzig Convent, in Leipzig, Saskatchewan
- Notre-Dame Street in Montreal

=== France ===
- Basilica of Notre-Dame de Fourvière, Lyon
- Cathedral of Notre Dame, Amiens
- Cathédrale Notre-Dame de Bayeux
- Cathédrale Notre-Dame de Chartres
- Cathédrale Notre-Dame de Laon
- Cathédrale Notre-Dame de Rouen
- Cathédrale Notre-Dame-de-Strasbourg
- Cathédrale Notre-Dame de Verdun, Verdun Cathedral
- Notre-Dame-de-Bon-Secours Chapel of Dieppe
- Church of Notre-Dame of Dijon
- Chapel of Notre Dame des Anges
- Collegiate Church of Notre-Dame, Melun
- Église Notre Dame de l'Assomption, Metz
- Église Notre-Dame la Grande, Poitiers
- Notre-Dame de la Garde, Marseille
- Notre Dame de l'Assomption, les Saintes, Terre-de-Haut
- Notre-Dame de Guebwiller
- Notre-Dame de Nice
- Notre-Dame de Paris
- Notre-Dame de Reims
- Notre Dame des Cyclistes, Labastide-d'Armagnac
- Notre Dame du Haut, Ronchamp
- Church of Notre-Dame, Villeneuve-sur-Yonne
- Church of Notre-Dame de Dives-sur-Merent

=== Haiti ===
- Cathédrale Notre-Dame de Port-au-Prince, Cathedral of Our Lady of the Assumption

=== Luxembourg ===
- Notre-Dame Cathedral, Luxembourg, the Roman Catholic Cathedral of Luxembourg City

=== United Kingdom ===
- Notre Dame de France, London

=== United States ===
- Basilica of the Sacred Heart, Notre Dame, Indiana
- Church of Notre Dame (New York City), a parish of the Roman Catholic Archdiocese of New York
- Notre Dame de Chicago, Chicago, Illinois

=== Vietnam ===
- Saigon Notre-Dame Basilica, Ho Chi Minh City

== Organizations ==
- Hospitalité Notre Dame de Lourdes, a Roman Catholic religious confraternity under the spiritual authority of the Bishop of Tarbes and Lourdes
- School Sisters of Notre Dame, a worldwide order of Roman Catholic nuns devoted to education
- Sisters of Notre Dame de Namur, a Roman Catholic order of religious sisters dedicated to providing education to the poor

== Places ==
=== Canada ===
- Notre Dame (electoral district), Manitoba
- Notre-Dame-de-Lourdes, Manitoba
- Notre-Dame, New Brunswick
- Notre-Dame-de-Lourdes, New Brunswick
- Notre Dame Bay, a large bay near the mouth of the Exploits River
- Notre-Dame-Auxiliatrice-de-Buckland, Quebec, Chaudière-Appalaches
- Notre-Dame-de-Bonsecours, Quebec, Outaouais
- Notre-Dame-de-Grâce, neighbourhood in Montreal
- Notre-Dame-de-Ham, Quebec, Centre-du-Québec
- Notre-Dame-de-la-Merci, Quebec, Lanaudière
- Notre-Dame-de-la-Paix, Quebec, Outaouais
- Notre-Dame-de-la-Salette, Quebec, Outaouais
- Notre-Dame-de-l'Île-Perrot, Quebec, Montérégie
- Notre-Dame-de-Lorette, Quebec, Saguenay-Lac-Saint-Jean
- Notre-Dame-de-Lourdes, Centre-du-Québec, Quebec
- Notre-Dame-de-Lourdes, Lanaudière, Quebec
- Notre-Dame-de-Montauban, Quebec, Mauricie
- Notre-Dame-de-Pontmain, Quebec, Laurentides
- Notre-Dame-de-Stanbridge, Quebec, Montérégie
- Notre-Dame-des-Anges, Quebec, Capitale-Nationale
- Notre-Dame-des-Bois, Quebec, Estrie
- Notre-Dame-des-Monts, Quebec, Capitale-Nationale
- Notre-Dame-des-Neiges, Quebec, Bas-Saint-Laurent
- Notre-Dame-des-Pins, Quebec, Chaudière-Appalaches
- Notre-Dame-des-Prairies, Quebec, Lanaudière
- Notre-Dame-des-Sept-Douleurs, Quebec, Bas-Saint-Laurent
- Notre-Dame-du-Lac, Quebec, Bas-Saint-Laurent
- Notre-Dame-du-Laus, Quebec, Laurentides
- Notre-Dame-du-Mont-Carmel, Quebec, Mauricie
- Notre-Dame-du-Mont-Carmel, Lacolle, Quebec, a former parish municipality in Montérégie that is now part of Lacolle, Quebec
- Notre-Dame-du-Nord, Quebec, Abitibi-Témiscamingue
- Notre-Dame-du-Portage, Quebec, Bas-Saint-Laurent
- Notre-Dame-du-Rosaire, Quebec, Chaudière-Appalaches
- Notre-Dame-du-Sacré-Cœur-d'Issoudun, Quebec, Chaudière-Appalaches
- Notre Dame Mountains, part of the Appalachian Mountains

=== Mauritius ===
- Notre Dame, Mauritius, a village in the Pamplemousses District

=== United States ===
- Notre Dame, Indiana, a census-designated place north of South Bend in St. Joseph County

== Colleges and universities ==
For secondary schools named "Notre Dame College" or variations, see Notre Dame High School

=== Australia ===
- University of Notre Dame Australia, Fremantle, Western Australia, Broome, Western Australia, and Sydney, New South Wales
- Notre Dame campus of Emmanuel College, Melbourne

=== Bangladesh ===
- Notre Dame College, Dhaka, a higher secondary school and degree-granting college affiliated to the National University
- Notre Dame University Bangladesh, a private university in Dhaka operated by the Congregation of Holy Cross
- Notre Dame College, Mymensingh, a higher secondary school of Bangladesh operated by the Congregation of Holy Cross

=== Belgium ===
- Facultés Universitaires Notre-Dame de la Paix, Namur

=== Canada ===
- Notre Dame University College, Nelson, British Columbia (1950–1984)

=== Haiti ===
- University Notre Dame of Haiti, Port-au-Prince

=== Japan ===
- Kyoto Notre Dame University, Sakyo-ku
- Notre Dame Seishin University, Okayama

=== Lebanon ===
- Notre Dame University – Louaize, Zouk Mosbeh

=== Netherlands ===
- Notre Dame des Anges, a secondary school in Ubbergen, Gelderland

=== Philippines ===
- Notre Dame Educational Association, a network of Notre Dame Schools including both secondary and tertiary institutions
- Notre Dame of Dadiangas University in General Santos City, South Cotabato
- Notre Dame of Isulan in Isulan, Sultan Kudarat
- Notre Dame of Marbel University in Koronadal City, South Cotabato
- Notre Dame of Midsayap College in Midsayap, North Cotabato
- Notre Dame University (Philippines) in Cotabato City, Maguindanao
- Notre Dame of Cotabato, Inc. in Cotabato City, Maguindanao
- Notre Dame – RVM College of Cotabato in Cotabato City, Maguindanao

=== United Kingdom ===
- Notre Dame College of Education (Glasgow), a former college in Glasgow, Scotland
- Notre Dame College of Education (Liverpool), a former college in Liverpool, England

=== United States ===
- Notre Dame College (New Hampshire), a former college in Manchester, New Hampshire
- Notre Dame College (Staten Island), a former women's college in Staten Island, New York
- Notre Dame College, a former women's college in South Euclid, Ohio
- Notre Dame de Namur University, Belmont, California
- Notre Dame of Maryland University, Baltimore, Maryland
- University of Notre Dame, Notre Dame, Indiana
  - Notre Dame Fighting Irish, the university's athletics teams
- Notre Dame Seminary, Louisiana

== Other uses ==
- Notre Dame (band), a Swedish metal band
- Notre Dame (grape) or Jurançon, a French wine grape
- Notre Dame (opera), a 1906 romantic opera by Franz Schmidt
- Notre-Dame, une fin d'après-midi, a 1902 painting by Henri Matisse
- Notre Dame school of Polyphony, a group of composers in Paris from about 1170 to 1250
- Notre-Dame Street, a street in Montreal

== See also ==
- Church of Our Lady (disambiguation)
- ND (disambiguation)
- NDU (disambiguation)
- Notre Dame de Lourdes (disambiguation)
- Notre-Dame de Paris (disambiguation)
- Notre Dame High School (disambiguation)
- Occurrence of religious symbolism in U.S. sports team names and mascots
- Our Lady (disambiguation) (French: Notre Dame)
- Notre (disambiguation)
- Dame (disambiguation)
