= Collège Notre-Dame =

Collège Notre-Dame may refer to:

- Collège Notre-Dame (Haiti)
- Collège Notre-Dame (Sudbury), Ontario, Canada
- Collège Notre Dame de Jamhour, Lebanon
- Collège Notre-Dame du Sacré-Cœur, in Montreal, Canada

== See also ==
- Notre Dame (disambiguation) § Higher education institutions
- Notre Dame High School (disambiguation)
