= Notre Dame – RVM College of Cotabato =

Roman Catholic college in Cotabato City, Philippines

Notre Dame - RVM College of Cotabato
- Former names: Escluela Catolica (1904–); Esuela de San Antonio; Colegio de los Corazones y Maria; Cotabato Parochial School; Notre Dame of Cotabato (1947–1979); Notre Dame of Cotabato for Girls(1979–2002); Notre Dame – RVM School of Cotabato (2002–2004)
- Motto: Initium Sapiente Timor Domini (Latin)
- Motto in English: The fear of the Lord is the beginning of wisdom.
- Type: Private Catholic Non-profit Coeducational Basic and Higher education institution
- Established: 1904; 122 years ago
- Founder: Congregation of the Religious of the Virgin Mary
- Religious affiliation: Roman Catholic (RVM Sisters)
- President: Sr. Remy Villaraiz, RVM
- Principal: Ms. Erlisa M. Apura
- Dean: Sr. Remy Villaraiz, RVM
- Patron saint: Venerable Ignacia del Espiritu Santo, RVM
- Location: Number 74 Sinsuat Avenue, Cotabato City, Maguindanao del Norte, Philippines; 7°12′53″N 124°14′38″E
- Campus: Urban
- Alma Mater song: Notre Dame Hymn
- Colors: Green and White
- Nickname: Ignacian Marians
- Website: ndrvmcotabato.com
- Location in Mindanao Location in the Philippines

Notre Dame – RVM College of Cotabato is a private, Catholic basic and higher education institution run by the Congregation of the Religious of the Virgin Mary in Cotabato City, Maguindanao del Norte, Philippines. It was established by the RVM Sisters in 1904. Notre Dame - RVM College is a member of the Notre Dame Educational Association, a group of schools named Notre Dame in the Philippines under the patronage of the Blessed Virgin Mary. Alumni and students of the institution are often called RVMians or Marians.

== History ==
Notre Dame – RVM College of Cotabato began as a school founded by the Beatas (now RVM Sisters) and named the Escuela Catolica. In 1904, the Superior General of the Beatas, Reverend Mother Elfigenia Alvarez sent four Beatas, namely Sr. Isabel Cero Mojado, RVM, Sr. Valentina Lorenzo, RVM, Sr. Filomena Galos, RVM and Sr. Severina Santos, RVM to open a Catholic school in Cotabato City . The first classes were held at the home of Don Antonio and Doña Eusebia Sousa, the generous benefactors of the Sisters. In 1917, the school obtained the government recognition and was granted the authority to issue certificates to the elementary school graduates. The subjects taught were Christian Doctrines, Reading and Writing, Drawing and Painting, and Home Arts for Girls. Until 1911, all instructions were in Spanish. When English became the medium of instruction, Spanish continued to be taught as a subject in all levels.

The school underwent several name changes from Escluela Catolica to Escuela de San Antonio, Colegio de los Corazones y Maria and finally, Cotabato Parochial School which it bore until World War II stopped its operation.

In, 1947, Archbishop Mongeau, then the O.M.I. Father Superior, founded the Notre Dame of Cotabato, a co – educational Catholic High School which in 1948 was separated into Boys' and Girls' Departments. The Marist Brothers, took over the administration of the Boys Department and remained in the original site of the School while the RVM Sisters, under the leadership of Sr. Ma. Isabel Purification, RVM moved the Girls Department to the Notre Dame of Cotabato. In 1979, Notre Dame of Cotabato for Girls Department finally became Notre Dame of Cotabato for Girls.

In 1984, the grade school department started to accept boys, while in 2000 the high school department started to accept boys too. Then in school year 2002–2003, the school underwent another change of name, Notre Dame – RVM School of Cotabato.

Various improvements happened under the leadership of Sr. Ma. Zosima N. Capua, RVM, the Directress. It saw the completion of the four-storey Mother Ignacia Building which houses the fourth year high school classes and the air-conditioned library.

Notre Dame – RVM School of Cotabato opened its college department starting school year 2003–2004. Two short term courses were offered: Hotel and Restaurant Management (2 years) and Caregiver Program (7 months). All classes were held in the new Mother Ignacia building.

In school year 2004–2005, the school celebrated its centennial year and the name was changed into Notre Dame – RVM College of Cotabato. Additional college courses were offered: Bachelor of Elementary Education and Bachelor of Science in Secondary Education with majors in English and Mathematics.

In the school year 2013–2014, the school directress was replaced by Sister Maria Fe Gerodias, RVM. In the same year a rehabilitation of Terrace 1 was made. The school underwent a major revamp during the years 2014-2015. The boys and girls were separated. The Old Mother Tan Building was also refurbished. Almost half of the school buildings were repainted.

On July 2, 2014 (Wednesday), a new school bus arrived on the campus but is only used for the annual trip to the retreat house in Davao City, Philippines.

== Basic Education Department ==
The K-12 Program was implemented in the school starting the academic year 2015–2016. The campus offers the following:

- Kindergarten (Kinder 1 to 2)
- Grade School (Grade 1 to 6)
- Junior High School (Grade 7 to 10)
- Senior High School (Grade 11 to 12)

=== Senior High School ===
During the school year 2015–2016, Notre Dame – RVM College of Cotabato accepted its first batch of Senior High School students. The Senior High School department houses its students in the newer buildings of the campus, the Assumption Building and Annunciation Building, with the exception of some sections which are located in the BSB 2 Building. Following are the strands offered by the school:

==== Academic Track ====
- Science, Technology, Engineering, and Mathematics
- Accountancy, Business, and Management
- Humanities and Social Sciences

== College Department ==
=== BS in Business Administration( BSBA) ===
- Major in Financial Management
- Major in Marketing Management

=== Bachelor of Secondary Education (BSEd) ===
- Major in English
- Major in Filipino
- Major in Physical Science
- Major in Mathematics

=== Associate Courses ===
- Associate in Computer Technology (ACT)
- Associate in Hotel and Restaurant Management (AHRM)

=== Tesda Courses ===
- Various Recognized Tesda Courses

== Infrastructures ==
- Assumption Building
- Annunciation Building
- Gymnasium
- Bishop Smith Building 1
- Bishop Smith Building 2
- Bishop Smith Building 3
- Mother Ignacia Building
- Mother Tan Building
- Our Lady of the Holy Rosary Building
- Administrative Building
- HRM Building
- Swimming Pool
- Grandstand
- Terrace 2
- Bakery
- Mini-Canteen
- Soccer Field

== Facilities ==
The following are the facilities provided by the campus.

=== Mother Tan Building ===
- School Clinic
- Christian Formation Center
- Grade School Computer Laboratory
- Grade School Library
- Grade School Audio-Visual Room
- Grade School Science Laboratory

=== Mother Ignacia Building ===
- School Canteen
- High School Computer Laboratory
- High School Internet Laboratory
- High School Library
- College Computer Laboratory

=== Bishop Smith Building 1 ===
- High School Science Laboratory

=== Bishop Smith Building 2 ===
- Technology and Livelihood Education Laboratory
- Prayer Room for Muslim (Girls)

=== Administrative Building ===
- Main Audio-Visual Room
- Prayer Room for Muslim (Boys)
- Chapel

=== Annunciation Building ===
- Tech-Voc Computer Laboratory
- Roof Deck Audio-Visual Room

=== Others ===
- HRM Laboratory
- Gymnasium
- Swimming Pool
- 2 Mini-Canteens
- Kiosk
- Radio Ignacia 87.9 FM (Campus Radio Station)

== Other Notre Dame Schools in the Philippines ==
- Notre Dame University - Cotabato City
- Notre Dame of Dadiangas University
- Notre Dame of Marbel University
- Notre Dame of Tacurong College
- Notre Dame of Midsayap College
- Notre Dame of Kidapawan College
- Notre Dame of Greater Manila
- Notre Dame of Kalamansig
