= Higher education in the Philippines =

Higher education system in the Philippines

Education in the Philippines

Commission on Higher Education (CHED) and Technical Education and Skills Development Authority (TESDA)

Higher education in the Philippines is offered through various degree programs (commonly known as "courses" in the country) by colleges and universities—also known as higher education institutions (HEIs). These HEIs are administered and regulated by the Commission on Higher Education (CHED).

There were 3,408,815 students enrolled in higher education for the school year 2019–2020, an increase of 457,620 from school year 2010–2011 student enrolment of 2,951,195.

== Classification ==
HEIs are either classified as a college or a university, and either public or private, and also either secular or religious. As of 2020, records from CHED showed that the country has 1,975 HEIs (excluding satellite campuses of state universities and colleges). From this number, 246 are public HEIs, while 1,729 are private institutions.

In the Philippines, college is a tertiary institution that typically offers a number of specialized courses in the sciences, liberal arts, or in specific professional areas, e.g. nursing, hotel and restaurant management and information technology. Meanwhile, to be classified as a university—such as state universities and colleges (SUCs), CHED-supervised higher education institutions (CHEIs), private higher education institutions (PHEIs) and community colleges (CCs)—it must meet the following requirements:

- operate at least eight different degree programs; including
  - at least six undergraduate courses, specifically
    - a four-year course in liberal arts,
    - a four-year course in science and mathematics,
    - a four-year course in the social sciences, and
    - a minimum of three other active and recognized professional courses leading to government licensures; and
  - at least two graduate-level courses leading to doctoral degrees.

Local universities have less stringent requirements than private HEIs. They are only required to operate at least five undergraduate programs—as opposed to eight for private universities—and two graduate-level programs.

=== Public higher education ===
Public universities are all non-sectarian entities, and are further classified into three types: State university and college (SUC), Local college and university (LCU), and Other Government Schools (OGS, CSI, Special HEIs).

==== State universities and colleges ====
State universities and colleges (SUCs) refers to any public institution of higher learning that was created by an Act passed by the Congress of the Philippines. These institutions are fully subsidized by the national government, and may be considered as a corporate body. SUCs are fully funded by the national government as determined by the Philippine Congress.

The University of the Philippines System, being the only national university, receives the biggest chunk of the budget among the 456 SUCs, and has likewise been strengthened by law through Republic Act 9500.

===== Enrollment rate =====
Only 10 percent of college students were in state-run schools in 1980, but this rose to 21 percent in 1994 and to almost 40 percent in 2008.

For school year 2019-2020, of the 3,408,425 enrollments, 1,321,773 (38.78%) were from State Colleges and Universities (SUCs), 248,731 (7.3%) were from Local Universities and Colleges (LUCs), 5,141 (0.15%) were classified under "Other Government Schools" (OGS), while 1,832,780 (53.77%) were from Private Higher Education Institutions.

===== List of SUCs by region =====
As of 2020, there are 112 State Universities and Colleges (SUCs) (excluding its 421 satellite campuses), 121 Local Colleges and Universities (LUCs), 13 "Other Government Schools" (OGSs), and 1,729 Private Higher Education Institutions in the Philippines. The SUCs are banded together in one organization called the Philippine Association of State Universities and Colleges (PASUC). As of 2004, PASUC's membership comprises 111 SUCs and 11 satellite associations.

==== Local colleges and universities ====
Local colleges and universities (LCUs), on the other hand, are run by local government units and established through local ordinance or other enabling acts. The Pamantasan ng Lungsod ng Maynila is first and largest among the LCUs.

=== Private tertiary institutions ===
Private colleges and universities may either be sectarian or non-sectarian entities. Institutions may either be not-for-profit or profit-oriented.

Most private schools are operated by not-for-profit Catholic institutions, like the Ateneo de Manila University (Jesuit), Xavier University - Ateneo de Cagayan (Jesuit), Adamson University (Vincentian), De La Salle University (Christian Brothers), Notre Dame University (Philippines) (Oblates of Mary Immaculate), Don Bosco Technical College (Salesian), Notre Dame of Dadiangas University (Marist Brothers of the Schools), Saint Louis University (Philippines) (CICM), San Beda University (Benedictine), Southeast Asia Interdisciplinary Development Institute (SAIDI), University of Asia and the Pacific (Opus Dei), University of the Immaculate Conception (Religious of the Virgin Mary), University of San Agustin (Augustinian), San Sebastian College – Recoletos (Augustinian Recollects), the University of San Carlos and the Divine Word College of Vigan (SVD), and the University of Santo Tomas and Colegio de San Juan de Letran (Dominican). However, there are also non-Catholic not-for-profit sectarian institutions such as Silliman University (Presbyterian), Adventist University of the Philippines (Seventh-day Adventist), Wesleyan University Philippines (Methodist), Central Philippine University (Baptist), Philippine Christian University (Methodist), Trinity University of Asia (Episcopalian).

There are also not-for-profit Islamic institutions, most notably the Jamiatu Muslim Mindanao.

Non-sectarian private schools, on the other hand, are corporations licensed by the Securities and Exchange Commission. Examples of these are Araullo University (PHINMA), AMA Computer University, Centro Escolar University, Far Eastern University, Mapúa University (iPeople), and STI College, among others, which are likewise registered on the Philippine Stock Exchange.

== Accreditation ==
Accreditation is a process for assessing and upgrading the educational quality of higher education institutions and programs through self-evaluation and peer judgment. It is a system of evaluation based on the standards of an accrediting agency, and a means of assuring and improving the quality of education. The process leads to a grant of accredited status by an accrediting agency and provides public recognition and information on educational quality.

=== Accreditation of private institutions ===
Voluntary accreditation of all higher education institutions is subject to the policies of the Commission on Higher Education. Voluntary accrediting agencies in the private sector are the Philippine Accrediting Association of Schools, Colleges and Universities (PAASCU), the Philippine Association of Colleges and Universities' Commission on Accreditation (PACUCOA), and the Association of Christian Schools, Colleges and Universities Accrediting Association Inc. (ACSCU-AAI) which all operate under the umbrella of the Federation of Accrediting Agencies of the Philippines (FAAP), which itself is the certifying agency authorized by CHED. Accreditation can be either of programs or of institutions.

Programs offered by satellite campuses of non-system higher education institutions are subject to separate accreditation of these accrediting agencies.

All institutions accredited by PAASCU, PACUCOA, or ACSCU-AAI and certified by FAAP are private higher education institutions. Under CHED's Revised Policies and Guidelines on Voluntary Accreditation in Aid of Quality and Excellence and Higher Education, program accreditation is classified into four levels, with Level IV representing the highest level of accreditation.

=== Accreditation for public institutions ===
Accrediting agencies for government-supported institutions are the Accrediting Agency of Chartered Colleges and Universities in the Philippines (AACCUP), and the Association of Local Colleges and Universities Commission on Accreditation (ALCUCOA). Together they formed the National Network of Quality Assurance Agencies (NNQAA) as the certifying agency for government-sponsored institutions. However NNQAA does not certify all government-sponsored institutions. Like private institutions, satellite campuses of non-system public institutions of higher learning are subject to separate accreditation.

The Technical Vocational Education Accrediting Agency of the Philippines (TVEAAP) was established and registered with the Securities Exchange Commission on October 27, 1987. On July 28, 2003, the FAAP board accepted the application of TVEAAP to affiliate with FAAP.

AACCUP and PAASCU are active members of the International Network of Quality Assurance Agencies for Higher Education (INQAAHE), and the Asia Pacific Quality Network (APQN).

== Autonomy and deregulation ==
In an effort to rationalize its supervision of institutions of higher learning, CHED has also prescribed guidelines for granting privileges of autonomy and deregulation to certain schools. According to the guidelines, the general criteria examined by CHED are an institution's "long tradition of integrity and untarnished reputation", "commitment to excellence", and "sustainability and viability of operations".

=== Autonomous status ===
Autonomous status allows HEIs to launch new courses/programs in the undergraduate and/or graduate levels including doctoral programs in areas of expertise without securing a permit/authority from CHED. HEIs granted autonomous status also enjoy the privilege of increasing tuition fees without securing a permit from CHED provided, however, that they fully comply with the existing CHED policies, standards, and guidelines (PSGs) on increases in tuition and other school fees, especially those pertaining to the consultation process and other requirements. Because of their autonomy, such HEIs are free from CHED’s monitoring and evaluation activities while complying with the submission of requested data for CHED’s data gathering and updating of its management information systems and projects.

Other benefits of HEIs granted autonomous status include exemption from the issuance of a Special Order (S.O.) for their graduates, priority in the grant of subsidies and other financial incentives/assistance from the CHED whenever funds are available, privilege to offer extension classes to expand access to higher education, authority to grant honorary degrees to deserving individuals in line with the provisions of the existing CHED issuance on conferment of honorary degrees, privilege to establish linkages with recognized foreign higher education institutions, provided that the existing CHED PSGs for twinning, networking, and linkages are fully complied with.

Aside from all host state colleges and universities and other chartered public universities, such as the University of the Philippines System, Polytechnic University of the Philippines, Mindanao State University System and Pamantasan ng Lungsod ng Maynila, and special private institutions such as the Asian Institute of Management, 77 private higher education institutions (HEIs) have been granted autonomous status as of September 2024. To avoid confusion, the campus name of satellite campuses having autonomous status is provided in parentheses. If the status is awarded to the sole campus or the main campus of the institution, the campus is not indicated with parentheses.

Higher education institutions (HEIs) that have been granted autonomous status
Region	HEI
I – Ilocos Region	Panpacific University; Saint Louis College La Union
II – Cagayan Valley	St. Paul University Philippines; Saint Mary's University
Cordillera Administrative Region	Saint Louis University; University of Baguio; University of the Cordilleras
III – Central Luzon	Angeles University Foundation; Baliuag University; Centro Escolar University (Malolos Campus); First City Providential College; Holy Angel University; La Consolacion University Philippines; Wesleyan University Philippines
IV-A – Calabarzon	Adventist University of the Philippines; Colegio de San Juan de Letran (Calamba); Lyceum of the Philippines University – Laguna; Lyceum of the Philippines University – Batangas; Lyceum of the Philippines University – Cavite; Manuel S. Enverga University Foundation; Mapúa Malayan Colleges Laguna; Our Lady of Fatima University - Antipolo Campus; Saint Michael's College of Laguna; St. Dominic College of Asia; University of Batangas; University of Perpetual Help System Laguna
V – Bicol Region	Ateneo de Naga University
VI – Western Visayas	Central Philippine University; John B. Lacson Foundation Maritime University (Arevalo); John B. Lacson Foundation Maritime University (Molo)
Negros Island Region	John B. Lacson Colleges Foundation – Bacolod; Silliman University; STI West Negros University; University of St. La Salle
VII – Central Visayas	Cebu Institute of Technology - University; University of San Carlos; University of San Jose–Recoletos; University of the Visayas - Main
X – Northern Mindanao	Capitol University; Misamis University; Xavier University – Ateneo de Cagayan
XI – Davao Region	Ateneo de Davao University; Cor Jesu College; University of Mindanao; University of Mindanao (Tagum College); University of Mindanao (Digos College); University of the Immaculate Conception
XII – Soccsksargen	Notre Dame of Dadiangas University; Notre Dame of Marbel University
National Capital Region	Adamson University; Asia Pacific College; Ateneo de Manila University; Centro Escolar University Makati; Centro Escolar University - Manila; De La Salle University; De La Salle–College of Saint Benilde; Emilio Aguinaldo College - Manila; Far Eastern University; Far Eastern University – Dr. Nicanor Reyes Medical Foundation; Far Eastern University Institute of Technology; José Rizal University; Lyceum of the Philippines University; Manila Central University; Mapúa University; Miriam College; National University; Our Lady of Fatima University - Quezon City; Our Lady of Fatima University - Valenzuela; Southeast Asia Interdisciplinary Development Institute (SAIDI); Southville International School and Colleges; St. Paul University Manila; Technological Institute of the Philippines Manila; Technological Institute of the Philippines Quezon City; Trinity University of Asia; University of Asia and the Pacific; University of Perpetual Help System DALTA - Las Piñas; University of Santo Tomas; University of the East
Note: Satellite campuses of non-system universities or colleges are indicated with parentheses.

CHED regularly reviews its list of autonomous institutions, with the latest published list valid until September 15, 2027. HEIs granted autonomous status shall enjoy benefits accorded to autonomous institutions until the specified date of validity or unless such status is revoked or suspended.

=== Deregulated status ===
HEIs with deregulated status enjoy the same privilege as autonomous HEIs, but they must still secure permits for new programs and campuses.

Higher education institutions (HEIs) that have been granted deregulated status
Region	HEI
I – Ilocos Region	Lyceum-Northwestern University; Northwestern University
IV-A – Calabarzon	De La Salle Medical and Health Sciences Institute; Emilio Aguinaldo College - Cavite; University of Perpetual Help System DALTA – Calamba Campus
VI – Western Visayas	Filamer Christian University; University of San Agustin
Negros Island Region	St. Paul University Dumaguete; University of Negros Occidental – Recoletos
IX – Zamboanga Peninsula	Ateneo de Zamboanga University
X – Northern Mindanao	Liceo de Cagayan University
National Capital Region	Colegio de San Juan de Letran; The Philippine Women's University; San Beda University; University of the East Caloocan
Note: Satellite campuses of non-system universities or colleges are indicated with parentheses.

CHED regularly updates its list of deregulated institutions with the latest published list valid until September 15, 2027. As of September 2024, 15 deregulated HEIs were listed by CHED.

== Rankings and league tables ==
=== Local rankings ===
There are no set methods for ranking institutions in the Philippines. Aside from comparisons in terms of accreditation, autonomy, and centers of excellence awarded by the Commission on Higher Education (CHED), there are attempts to rank schools based on performance in board exams conducted by the Professional Regulation Commission (PRC). The PRC and CHED sometimes publish reports on these results.

In 2009, CHED executive director Julito Vitriolo said that they are in the process of establishing appropriate guidelines to rank Philippine universities and colleges for each specific academic program or discipline. As of June 2015, such rankings do not exist yet.

=== International rankings ===
Internationally, the Ateneo de Manila University, De La Salle University, the University of the Philippines (as a system), and the University of Santo Tomas are regularly listed among the region and world's top universities in league tables and surveys such as in the now-defunct Asiaweek university rankings (which last ranked universities in 1999 and 2000), and the THES-QS World University Rankings since 2005.

QS World University Rankings of the top Philippine universities by year
University	2025	2024	2023	2022	2021	2020	2019	2018	2017	2016	2015	2014	2013	2012	2011	2010	2009	2008	2007	2006	2005
University of the Philippines (system)	▼336	▼404	▲412	▲399	▲396	▼356	▲384	▼367	▼374	▲401-410	▼367	380	▲380	▲348	▲332	▲314	▼262	▼276	▲398	▼299	372
Ateneo de Manila University	▼516	▼563	▲651–700	601-650	601-650	▼601-650	▲651-700	▲551-600	501-550	▲501-550	▼461-470	501-550	▲501-550	▲451-500	▲360	▲307	▼234	▼254	▼451	▼484	520
De La Salle University	▼641–650	▼681–690	801-1000	801-1000	801-1000	801-1000	▲801-1000	701-750	701+	▲701+	▲651-700	601-650	601-650	▲601+	▲551-600	▲451-500	401-500	▼401-500	▲519	▼392	526
University of Santo Tomas	▲851-900	▼801–850	801-1000	801-1000	801-1000	801-1000	801-1000	▲801-1000	701+	701+	701+	701+	▲701+	601+	▲601+	▲551-600	▲501-600	▼401-500	▲535	▼500	531

There are other university rankings based on different methodologies and criteria. In the Webometrics Ranking of World Universities by a Spanish research body, which measures a university’s Internet presence and the volume of research output freely accessible online, has UP and La Salle ranked ahead of other local universities. Far Eastern University has been recognized as one of the most innovative universities in the world as it ranks 91st in the WURI 2020: Global Top 100 Innovative Universities. On the other hand, in the Shanghai Jiao Tong University Academic Ranking of World Universities, which is based on Nobel Prize winners, Fields medals for mathematicians, highly cited researchers, or articles in Nature or Science; and, the École des Mines de Paris rankings, which is according to the number of alumni who are the CEOs of the Fortune 500 companies, do not have Philippine universities in the top 500.

=== QS Asian University Rankings ===
In the 2024 Quacquarelli Symonds' Asia University Rankings, 16 Philippine schools have been included in the listing. These schools are:

- University of the Philippines (system) (78)
- Ateneo de Manila University (137)
- De La Salle University (154)
- University of Santo Tomas (179)
- Adamson University (551-600)
- Polytechnic University of the Philippines (551-600)
- University of San Carlos (551-600)
- Mapúa University (601-650)
- Silliman University (601-650)
- Ateneo de Davao University (651-700)
- Far Eastern University (701-750)
- Mindanao State University-Iligan Institute of Technology (701-750)
- Saint Louis University (751-800)
- Lyceum of the Philippines University (801+)
- Mindanao State University (801+)
- Xavier University - Ateneo de Cagayan (801+)

=== Views of the THES-QS rankings ===
Rankings such as the THES-QS have been received with mixed reactions. In 2006, Ang Pamantasan, the official student paper of Pamantasan ng Lungsod ng Maynila, published the university's criticism on the rankings, saying that the THES-QS criteria do not apply to the unique landscape of each participating universities, and that such rankings say nothing or very little about whether students are actually learning at particular colleges or universities. On the same year, the University of the Philippines, through its University President Emerlinda Román, expressed that it does not want to participate in the THES-QS Ranking, but was included in 2007 with an incomplete academic profile. That same year, Ateneo de Manila University President Fr. Bienvenido Nebres, S.J. commented on the rankings, pointing out that rankings such as these did not adequately reflect the university's progress or how well it has been working toward achieving its mission-vision.

In 2008, the University of the Philippines questioned the validity of the 2008 THES-QS rankings, claiming that the methodology used was "problematic", and cited the International Ranking Systems for Universities and Institutions: A Critical Appraisal, which found out that The Times simply asks 190,000 ‘experts’ to list what they regard as the top 30 universities in their field of expertise without providing input data on any performance indicators, as one of the bases for rejecting the said survey. Furthermore, the UP said that THES-QS refused to divulge how and where the data were taken from, and instead, advised the university to advertise at the THES-QS website for US$ 48,930 publicity package. CHED Chairperson Emmanuel Angeles, on the other hand, commended all four Philippine universities that made it to the list. He also suggested that Philippine schools would get better in the future THES-QS rankings if they choose to advertise in the THES-QS publications and when budgetary allocations for faculty and researchers, particularly at UP, would become better in the coming years.

== See also ==
- Education in the Philippines
- Medical education in the Philippines
- Legal education in the Philippines
- List of universities and colleges in the Philippines
- List of Catholic universities and colleges in the Philippines

=== Categories ===
- Category:Schools of medicine in the Philippines
- Category:Graduate schools in the Philippines
- Category:Law schools in the Philippines
- Category:Liberal arts colleges in the Philippines
- Category:Business schools in the Philippines
- Category:Private universities and colleges in the Philippines
- Category:Women's universities and colleges in the Philippines
