= Notre Dame of Jolo College =

Roman Catholic college in Sulu, Philippines

- Type: Private Roman Catholic non-profit coeducational Basic and Higher education institution
- Established: June 14, 1954; 72 years ago
- Founders: Bp. Francis McSorley, OMI
- Religious affiliation: Roman Catholic (Oblates)
- Academic affiliations: NDEA; PAASCU
- Chairman: Fr.Gerry G.Delos Reyes, OMI
- President: Fr. Ross B. Kapunan, OMI
- Location: Gandasuli, Jolo, Sulu, Philippines; 6°03′17″N 121°00′23″E
- Hymn: Notre Dame Hymn
- Website: ndjc.edu.ph
- Location in Mindanao Location in the Philippines

Notre Dame of Jolo College is private school run by Missionary Oblates of Mary Immaculate in Jolo, Sulu, Philippines, founded on June 14, 1954 by Bishop Francis McSorley, OMI. in order to bring educational benefits to the people of Sulu Province. The founders were particularly interested in training teachers who would bring advantages of good education at the grassroots level in all the far-flung islands of Sulu. Notre Dame of Jolo College is a member of Notre Dame Educational Association Philippines.

The first cooperative in Jolo, the Sulu Consumer's Cooperative, was developed by the Notre Dame of Jolo College.

== Other Notre Dame Schools in the Philippines ==
- Notre Dame of Greater Manila
- Notre Dame of Midsayap College (NDMC)
- Notre Dame University - Cotabato City (NDU)
- Notre Dame of Dadiangas University (NDDU)
- Notre Dame of Kidapawan College (NDKC)
- Notre Dame of Marbel University (NDMU)
- Notre Dame of Tacurong College (NDTC)
