= Cotabato State University =

Public university in Cotabato City, Philippines

- Pamantasang Pampamahalaan ng Cotabato (Filipino)
- Former names: Cotabato High School (1924–1983); Cotabato City State Polytechnic College (1983–2021)
- Type: State/public higher education institution
- Established: 1924; 102 years ago
Academic affiliations
PASUC, MASTS	AACCUP SCUAA
(Mindanao Association of State Tertiary Schools)
- President: Dr. Sema G. Dilna
- Vice-president: Dr. Abdulsamad S. Shaik (VP for Administration & Finance); Dr. Kundo M. Pahm, Jr. (VP for Academic Affairs); Dr.Teng A. Alim (VP for Research, Extension & Resource Generation)
- Location: Cotabato City, Philippines; 07°12′43.21″N 124°14′43.59″E
- Colors: Maroon- symbolizes courage and determination; White - stands for truth; Yellow- represents loyalty
- Nickname: CSU LIGHTS
- Website: www.cotsu.edu.ph
- Location in Mindanao Location in the Philippines

Cotabato State University or CotSU, formerly Cotabato City State Polytechnic College, is a government-funded higher education institution located in Cotabato City, Philippines. It is mandated to provide professional and advanced vocational instruction and training in agriculture, fisheries, forestry, science and technology, engineering, and industrial technologies. It is also mandated to promote research, advanced studies, and progressive leadership in its field of specialization. Its main campus is located in Cotabato City.

In April 2021, the Republic Act 10585 an act converting Cotabato City State Polytechnic College into Cotabato State University was fully implemented.

== See also ==
- Notre Dame University (Philippines)
- Notre Dame - RVM College of Cotabato
