= Notre Dame of Kiamba =

Roman Catholic school in Sarangani, Philippines

Coordinates: 5°59′16″N 124°37′57″E

Notre Dame of Kiamba (NDK) is a private school in National Highway, Poblacion, Kiamba, Sarangani formerly run by Marist Brothers. NDK has been a member of the Notre Dame Educational Association, a group of Notre Dame Schools in the Philippines under the patronage of the Blessed Virgin Mary.
