= St. Mary's Academy of Kidapawan =

Roman Catholic school in Cotabato, Philippines

- Former names: Our Lady Mediatrix School (1951); Notre Dame Elementary School of Kidapawan (1956); Notre Dame of Kidapawan for Girls (1976); Notre Dame of Kidapawan
- Motto: Initium Sapientiae Timor Domini (Latin)
- Motto in English: The fear of the Lord is the beginning of Wisdom.
- Type: Private Roman Catholic Coeducational Basic education institution
- Established: 1948
- Founders: Rev. James McSorley, OMI
- Religious affiliation: Roman Catholic (RVM Sisters)
- Academic affiliations: NDEA
- Principal: Sr. Maria Niña C. Balbas RVM
- Location: Kidapawan City, Cotabato, Philippines; 7°1′6″N 125°5′25″E
- Campus: Urban 19,813 square meters
- Colors: Blue and White

St. Mary's Academy of Kidapawan (SMA-Kidapawan), formerly Notre Dame of Kidapawan for Girls, is a Catholic educational institution operated by the Religious of the Virgin Mary (R.V.M.) located at the foot of Mt. Apo in Kidapawan City, Cotabato, on the island of Mindanao in the Philippines.

The school is also a member of the Notre Dame Educational Association (NDEA), which a network of Notre Dame Schools in the Philippines under the patronage of Blessed Virgin Mary.

== History ==
The school was founded in 1948 by Rev. James McSorley, OMI, the first parish priest of Kidapawan. Bishop Gerard Mongeau, OMI, the prelate of Cotabato City to which Kidapawan belonged at that time, gave the approval for the opening of the new school.

The Church through Bishop Mongeau and Fr. James McSorley, OMI bought two hectares of thick-forested land for the parish and the school site with an area of 19,813 square meters. The construction of the first high school building was done in the "Bayanihan Style" by the civic spirited parishioners of Kidapawan and nearby parishes.

In the school year 1948–1949, one hundred forty-four (144) students enrolled in the high school from first year to third year. Fr. McSorley was the Director and Mr. Norberto Comendador the principal.

On December 29, 1948, the school was registered in the Securities and Exchange Commission, with the following listed for its Board of Trustees: Rev. Gerard Mongeau, OMI, Rev. James McSorley, OMI and Rev. Robert Sullivan, OMI. The Articles of Incorporation and By-Laws were approved on February 2, 1949. The following school year 1949–1950, a fourth year program was opened with a total enrollment of 264. In March 1950, the first high school graduation was held and Leticia Evengelista, now an RVM Sister, was the valedictorian.

In 1951, Bishop Mongeau requested the Religious of the Virgin Mary (RVM) to open an elementary school in Kidapawan, to which was assented by Rev. Mo. Ma. Andrea Montejo, RVM, Superior General. In 1951, the RVM Sisters came to Kidapawan and took charge of the school, naming it Our Lady Mediatrix in honor of the Patroness of the Parish in Kidapawan.

On June 15, 1953, government recognition for the complete secondary course was awarded by the Secretary of Education.

In July 1954, the Oblate Fathers turned over the school to the Marist Brothers, with the RVM Sisters assisting them in the administration of the school. Brother Maurus, FMS was the rector and Sister Ma. Beatriz de Aquino, RVM was the principal.

In March 1956, the school held its first elementary school graduation with 14 pupils, 6 boys and 8 girls. Finally, on June 11, 1956, the complete elementary course was recognized by the Secretary of Education. The name of the school was changed to Notre Dame Elementary School of Kidapawan.

When Rev. M. Ma. Catalina Dychitan, RVM was the Superior General and Sister Ma. Andrea Montejo, RVM, the Regional Superior of Mindanao, Bishop Mongeau segregated sexes, and a contract was made to the effect that the girls will be educated by the Sisters and the boys by the Marist Department of Kidapawan City, now Notre Dame of Kidapawan College.

In June 1965, the Notre Dame Elementary School was transferred from the old lot to the present site.

In 1976, a two-storey wooden elementary building was constructed and the RVM Congregation applied for the change of the name of the school to Notre Dame of Kidapawan for Girls.

On June 14, 1977, the school's new name was recognized and the kindergarten course was also awarded "Recognition" by Hon. Juan Manuel, the Secretary of Education. Notre Dame of Kidapawan for Girls celebrated its Silver Jubilee in S.Y. 1974–1975.

In 1982–1983, a mini gym was constructed using the sides as classrooms and music room.

On December 18, 1991, Sister Ma. Josefina Fran, RVM received the funding she requested from the Raskob Foundation for the Non-Formal Education program amounting to ₱280,000 to purchase typewriters. These were to be used by the Mother Ignacia Community Services Program every Saturday, and the third and fourth year students in their typing classes.

The school year 1993-1994 brought the academic community in touch with modern facilities deemed important components of learning and of the school's response to the DECS Program of a curriculum that would prepare the students for the Philippines 2000 program. Computer classes were offered from Elementary to High School.

The new and modern Speech Laboratory, which was acquired in 1990s, has a master control that holds fifty (50) microphones with headphones, offered to elementary and high school students to improve the quality of their voice and speech. This is a joint project of the school and the Supreme Family Council (SFC).

In school year 1994–1995, the school again became a co-educational institution. On March 28, 2000, the name Notre Dame of Kidapawan was officially changed to St. Mary's Academy of Kidapawan.

In 2009, the Notre Dame of Kidapawan for Girls - St. Mary's Academy of Kidapawan Alumni Association was granted an Incorporation Status by the Philippine Securities and Exchange Commission, thus proclaiming it as Notre Dame of Kidapawan for Girls- St. Mary's Academy of Kidapawan Alumni Association, Inc.

In 2009, a new building in line with the "Seat of Wisdom Building," as well as a new gate were constructed. On April 10, 2010, the new Administration Building was finally blessed.

== The School Hymn ==
The school we love St. Mary's is her name

She stands a statue great and strong,

She holds our hands and guides us through the world

By keeping us all sound and strong.

She molds our souls by teaching us the faith

She molds our minds and bodies, too.

She's all what a mother is She's our beloved SMA.

Let's hold her high and lift her to the heights.

Let's fight for her and love her all the time.

Now open your hearts to her, dear SMA.

St. Mary's Academy, she's a true Alma Mater dear.

St. Mary's Academy, she's a school and a home all in one.

St. Mary's Academy, let her blue and her white banner fly

Let her live in all our hearts and lips

Let Saint Mary's Academy ever live. and the end.

== Seal ==
"AM" stands for "Ave Maria" in praise of our Blessed Mother Mary, the Patroness of the RVM Congregation. The stars which surround the monogram "AM" represent the God-given prerogatives of Mary, Mother of God and Mother of the Church. The rays signify the light and wisdom from God through Jesus Christ, the Light of the World. The sampaguita beneath the book symbolizes the purity of heart of Mary and Mother Ignacia and the Filipino origin of the school. At the center of the seal is an open book which bears the Latin inscription, "Initium Sapientiae Timor Domini". The line means "The fear of the Lord is beginning of Wisdom"(Prov. 2:6). It expresses filial fear, a disposition of profound reverence, awe and love for God, the Source of all wisdom, grace and life.

== Notable alumni ==
- [B.General] Juanito Malto (ND-Elem'56, etc.), is a former deputy chief of staff for logistics in Armed Forces of the Philippines (ret. date Nov 30, 95).
- Gov. Emmylou "Lala" Taliño-Mendoza(HS'89, etc.) is the incumbent governor of the Cotabato Province.
