= Ndu =

Ndu may refer to:

- Ndu, Cameroon, a town and commune in Cameroon
- Ndu languages, a language family of Papua New Guinea
- Ndo language, a language of Uganda and Congo

NDU may refer to:

- National Defense University, Republic of China (Taiwan)
- National Defence University, Islamabad, Pakistan
- National Defense University, United States
- National Distribution Union, a trade union in New Zealand
- Nationaldemokratisk Ungdom (National Democratic Youth), Swedish youth organisation
- Naval Diving Unit (Singapore), part of Singapore Navy
- Ndejje University, Uganda
- New Design University, Austria
- Niger Delta University, Nigeria
- The Nippon Dental University, Japan
- Notre Dame (disambiguation)#Universities and Colleges
