= Notre Dame of Kidapawan College =

Roman Catholic college in Cotabato, Philippines

- Former name: Notre Dame of Kidapawan High School (1948-1960)
- Motto: Coelum Obtinere Mariam Sequere (Latin)
- Type: Private Catholic Research Non-profit Coeducational Basic and Higher education institution
- Established: July 1948
- Founders: Bishop Gerard G. Mongeau, OMI, DD
- Religious affiliation: Roman Catholic (Marist Brothers)
- Academic affiliations: NDEA, PAASCU
- Chairman: Br. Wilfredo E. Lubrico, FMS
- President: Br. Arnel S. Alfanta, FMS
- Principal: Bryll L. Espeja,LPT, MAEd, MSc (IBED Principal)
- Dean: Dr. Stella C. Flores (Dean – Graduate School); Dr. Erlinda H. Padua (Dean – College)
- Director: Br. Arnel S. Alfanta, FMS (Director of Student Affairs & Services); Sr.Rhodora C.Lechugas, OND (Director of Campus Ministry & Religious Education); Jyaren B. Beatisula, RSW, MSW (Director of Community & Extension Services)
- Location: Datu Ingkal St., Kidapawan City, Cotabato,, Philippines; 7°00′43″N 125°05′44″E
- Colors: Green and White
- Nickname: Notre Damean
- Mascot: Eagle
- Website: www.ndkc.edu.ph
- Location in Mindanao Location in the Philippines

Notre Dame of Kidapawan College, also referred to by its acronym NDKC, is a private, Catholic basic and higher education institution run by the Marist Brothers of the Schools or FMS (Fratres Maristae a Scholis), a Catholic religious order from France. It was founded by Bishop Gerard G. Mongeau, OMI, DD in 1948. It offers elementary, high school, undergraduate and postgraduate courses (in consortium with NDDU and independent program). It is located in Kidapawan City, Cotabato, Philippines. NDKC has been a member of the Notre Dame Educational Association, a group of schools named Notre Dame in the Philippines which is under the patronage of the Blessed Virgin Mary.

== History ==
In July 1948, Bishop Gerard G. Mongeau, OMI, DD of the Prelature of Cotabato opened the Notre Dame of Kidapawan High School. The 264 students who enrolled were distributed from 1st to 3rd year. The 4th year was set to open the following year. The first director was Rev. Father Francis McSorley, OMI. He was at the same time the Parish Priest of Our Lady Mediatrix of All Graces Parish in Kidapawan. Hence, his convent became the administration building of the infant school.

As the school flourished under the guidance of the Oblate priests, the enrollment swelled so much that the Parish Priest-Director found the job too taxing and pre-judicial to the efficient administration of both the parish and the school. So, in July 1954, the Oblates turned over the administration of the school to the Marist Brothers of the Schools (FMS). This would relieve them for parish activities and duties.

In July 1958, the Notre Dame of Kidapawan was completely separated into two departments: the Boys’ Department under the Marist Brothers, and the Girls’ Department under the RVM sisters. The original site was given to the Girls’ Department, and the Boys’ Department transferred to a new site, located in a quiet atmosphere 500 meters away from the National Highway. A one-storey, 11-room hollow block building was constructed on the 4-hectare campus.

In the school year 1960–1961, in response to the repeated requests of the people of Kidapawan, the Boys’ Department under the Marist Brothers through the efforts of Bro. Norman Roy, FMS obtained permission from the Bureau of Private Schools to offer first year collegiate courses in Secretarial, Liberal Arts and Commerce. The college became co-educational and the first enrollment numbered to 58. In school year 1963–1964, the BSE, and BSEED curricula were added to the courses already offered. Since the BSEED curriculum required a training department for the student teachers, the college got permission from the Bureau of Private Schools to offer a complete elementary course. A new 8-room, training department building was constructed, complete with office and library facilities. At the same time, a wing was added to the old building to accommodate the growing number of college students.

In 1965, the college received a recognition from the Bureau of Private Schools to offer the complete four-year courses in Education, Commerce, Liberal Arts and Secretarial.

To meet the demands of the growing school population and to avoid interruption of school activities by the unpredictable weather of Kidapawan, a Gymnasium was constructed in the upper level of the campus in September 1968.

Later in 1970, three new major fields of concentration were offered namely: Economic, English, and Biology in the Collegiate Education and Liberal Arts courses, while two were offered in the Commerce: Economics, and Business Administration. In 1977 Accounting and Government Accounting and Auditing were also added to the Commerce curricula.

In 1978, the NDKC administration, aware of the important role played by the school in the community, started a re-direction program in the college. A new course, Agri-Business, was given permit to open in 1979. This course was offered to meet the needs of the community, but the school made it certain that the re-direction would not weaken in any way NDKC's traditional policy of academic excellence.

Since 1978, the collegiate enrollment has grown gradually. When the new college building (3 stories) was first occupied for the use of the students in June 1980, the enrollment increased significantly and reached the 1,500 mark.

The Commerce, Education, and Liberal Arts programs prepared for PAASCU accreditation starting first semester of the SY 1979–1980. The preliminary visit was during the first semester of SY 1980–81 after which it was given the go-signal to prepare for the formal visit the following year.

The formal PAASCU visit was on September 22–24, 1982, and on November 16, 1982, PAASCU issued a Certificate granting NDKC a 3-year Level I accreditation status. The first Re-Accreditation visit was then made on November 25–26, 1985 after which PAASCU granted NDKC a 5-year Level II Deregulated Status as confirmed in the Certificate dated July 21, 1986. It has acquired 5-year Level II status during the succeeding PAASCU visit on January 21–22, 1992 through the Certificate of Accreditation dated December 11, 1992. This status was maintained even after the September 22–23, 1997 visit.

The High School Department also sought PAASCU accreditation and had its first visit on February 9–11, 1987. It had its formal visit on January 29–31, 1990, after which it was granted Level I status. It got the Level II status after the January 28–29, 1993 visit, and has maintained this status even after the February 2–3, 1998 re-survey visit.

The last to seek PAASCU accreditation was the Elementary Department. It underwent a preliminary visit on March 8–9, 1993, and a consultancy visit on March 6, 1995. A year later, after the February 26–27, 1996 formal visit, it was granted a 3-year accreditation. They got another 5-year re-accreditation after the October 25–26, 1999 visit.

From 1983 to 1988, NDKC became one of the implementing institutions of the NDEA-wide Accelerated Training of Teachers for Cultural Communities (ATTCC) Program, which was funded by UNICEF and CIDA. The offering of this program was one of the factors that contributed to the increase of enrollment during these years.

Library Science was offered in SY 1986–1987 as a major field in the Liberal Arts and BSE curricula. However, in 1990, the enrolment decreased due to the gradual phase out of Junior Secretarial course, and BS Commerce major in accounting. The phasing out of BS Commerce major in Accounting was due to a new DECS policy and guidelines separating Accountancy from Commerce.

In response to the trend of the times, NDKC started to offer Associate in Computer Science (ACS) in 1991–1992. Marketing was also offered as major field for the BS Commerce, and Political Science for the Liberal Arts. In 1992–1993 it started to offer BS in Computer Science (BSCS), and BS Accountancy (BSA). Later in 1995–1996 it offered another major field to the BSC-the Financial and Managerial Accounting. Because of these developments, the trend of enrolment improved.

In its desire to become relevant to the demand of the community and specifically to assist its graduates regarding their problem on graduate education, NDKC entered into a consortium with the Notre Dame University (NDU) Graduate School in 1992. The term consortium was later changed by CHED to extension. Hence, NDKC became the Extension of NDU Graduate School. With available resources and with NDU's assistance, it gradually offered the following courses: MA in education (MAEd) major in Educational Administration, Guidance and Counseling, Filipino, and Mathematics; Master in Public Administration (MPA); and Master in Business Administration (MBA).

In 1997–1998 NDKC offered two (2) independent programs: The Master of Arts (MA) in English, and Master of Arts (MA) in Mathematics. These programs received CHED recognition effective 2000–2001.

The High School was made co-educational in June 1993 after 2 years of preparatory work. This was in response to strong clamor among parents of female grade school pupils. This development made a significant increase in enrollment.

After sixteen years, the completion of the second phase of the college building was realized through the efforts of the NDKC President (1991–2006), Bro. John Y. Tan, FMS. The Manos Unidas, Spain granted 4.5M for the purpose. The three-storey building which was completed in 1996 has 12 classrooms with comfort rooms in every storey. Prior to this development, a good number of buildings were constructed, and some renovated. Constructions included the Student Center of the College Department, the CES-NFE Center, the Elementary (expansion) building, chapel, and the High School (expansion) building.

The new college building that housed the Speech and Engineering Laboratories, and 2 classrooms was occupied in June 1999. In June 2002, these classrooms were transformed into the Fundamental Laboratory, and Demonstration Room of the BS Nursing. In June 2000 the Internet Café and Bookroom were also made functional. In June 2002, a 4-classroom building was constructed at the right wing of the gymnasium. Two of the high school classrooms were also renovated and became the Speech Laboratory, and THE Laboratory of the department.

NDKC acquired the permit to offer BS Civil Engineering (BSCE) starting 1996–1997. Later in SY 1998–1999 it offered 3 additional courses- the BS Information Technology (BSIT), BS Information Management (BSIM), and BS Electronics and Communications Engineering (BSECE). Mass Communication major was also offered in the Liberal Arts in June 2000. The latest curriculum development was the offering of the 5-year BS Accountancy starting SY 2001–2002, and in SY 2002–2003 the BS in nursing (BSN).

School year 1998–1999 was the celebration of the Marist Brothers’ 50th year of presence in the Philippines and the school actively participated in the year-round activities. The following year, in April 1999, Marcellin Champagnat was canonized. NDKC sent seven representatives to Rome to attend the canonization.

The RE and Euthenics subjects were evaluated, revised and enriched in order to be relevant as the core of the curriculum. At the same time, the CMRE programmed and facilitated opportunities for spiritual development of the academic community through colloquia, retreat/recollections, enrichments sessions and the like.

To address the local and international demand for nurses, the Nursing program was opened in June, 2001.

School Year 2003–2004 was considered as PAASCU accreditation year. On August 3–4, 2003, PAASCU evaluated the Commerce, Liberal Arts, and Education programs. The high school department was surveyed by PAASCU on September 1–2, 2003 and both departments were granted a five-year accreditation status. The college department was also recognized by FAPE through NDEA as the Center for the Certification of ECE program in Cotabato area.

The school was granted permit to operate the BSA five-year curriculum on SY 2004–2005. The new high school building was also completed at the start of the school year.

NDKC renovated the faculty rooms and installed air-conditioning units at the college to improve working and teaching-learning conditions on SY 2005–2006. It also saw the birth of the research climate in the college department which offered new avenues to critical awareness, shared responsibility and insights. One research output was required per department every school year. Eventually, teachers will adapt to such climate as a part of professional enrichment and sharpening of skills.

Bro. Teodulo A. Fernandez, FMS became the 13TH NDKC president in May 2006. He was formally installed on September 6, 2006. The new four-storey college building was completed in June 2006. The said building relatively solved the noise created by traffic and vehicles during classes and activities. Most classes were scheduled in this building hence, more subjects were programmed and offered. Problems on curricular offerings were minimized.

The BSBA curriculum as per CMO 39, s2006 replaced the BSC curricular offerings effective SY 2007–2008. The school is preparing for the PAASCU formal visit for both high school and college departments scheduled in September 2008.

Effective first semester of school year 2007–2008, NDKC Graduate School entered into an extension agreement with Notre Dame of Dadiangas University (NDDU). Graduate Programs include Master in Public Administration (MPA), Master in Business Administration (MBA), Master of Arts in nursing (M.A.N.) and Master of Arts in education (MA.Ed). Furthermore, in the first trimester of school year 2009 – 2010, the Doctorate of Philosophy in Education program was opened to address the need for advanced studies of the clientele.

Bro. Briccio J. Baynosa, FMS became the 15TH NDKC President in April 2010 after serving as Officer-In-Charge for one school year. He was formally installed on June 7, 2010. Starting School Year 2010–2011, NDKC added three new curricular programs: BS Computer Engineering (BSCpE), BS Accounting Technology (BSAT) and AB Philosophy.

In consonance with the school's mission to upgrade all departments, the Liberal Arts, Education and Business Administration programs sought Level II accreditation by PAASCU in September 2010. These were granted reaccreditation for five years, valid until November 2015. Meanwhile, the Computer Science program went through a preliminary survey.

Furthermore, PAASCU also granted re-accreditation to the IBED-Elementary Department for a period of five years (valid until November 2015).

On September 24, 2010, during the CEAP convention held at the Waterfront Hotel in Lahug, Cebu City, NDKC was awarded one of its Jubilarians, having been a member of the CEAP since 1960 (50 years). Bro. Briccio J. Baynosa, FMS, NDKC President, accepted the award.

In November 2010, the Board of Trustees approved the proposed reorganization of NDKC. Thus, the new organizational set-up involved the creation of the position, Executive Vice-president, the alter ego of the President who oversees the entire operation of the school in the absence of the President. Also, the Deans head the Colleges of Business Administration, Education, Liberal Arts, Engineering and Information Technology, Accountancy and Nursing.

== List of NDKC Directors and Presidents ==
Year	Director/President
1954 – 1955 January	Bro. Maurus James Doherty, FMS
1955–1961	Bro. Norman Roy, FMS
1961 February – 1961 April	Bro. Maurus James Doherty, FMS
1961–1962	Bro. Regis Xavier Creegan, FMS
1962–1963	Bro. Herbert Daniel Dumont, FMS
1963–1964	Bro. Augustine Cabrera, FMS
1964–1969	Bro. Reginald Theodore Laflamme, FMS
1969–1970	Bro. Isidro Saranillo, FMS
1970–1971	Bro. Thomas Edward Henessy, FMS
1971 July – 1976	Bro. Augustine Obed, FMS
1976–1978	Bro. Eugene Pius Tajo, FMS
1978–1980	Bro. Bernard J. Curtin, FMS
1980–1985	Bro. Briccio J. Baynosa, FMS
1985–1991	Bro. Rene A. Reyes, FMS
1991–2006	Bro. John Y. Tan, FMS
2006–2009	Bro. Teodulo A. Fernandez, FMS
2009–2010	Bro. Manuel V. de Leon, FMS
2011–2014	Bro. Manuel P. Uluan, FMS
2014-2020	Bro. Manuel V. de Leon, FMS
2020–Present	Bro. Arnel S. Alfanta, FMS

== Programs ==
=== College of Engineering ===
- Bachelor of Science in Electronics and Communications Engineering
- Bachelor of Science in Civil Engineering

=== College of Arts and Sciences ===
- Bachelor of Arts in Communication
- Bachelor of Arts – Major in Economics
- Bachelor of Arts – Major in English
- Bachelor of Arts – Major in Philosophy
- Bachelor of Arts – Major in Political Science

=== College of Education ===
- Bachelor in Secondary Education – Major in AP
- Bachelor in Elementary Education
- Bachelor in Elementary Education – Major in Pre-School Education
- Bachelor in Secondary Education – Major in Biology
- Bachelor in Secondary Education – Major in English
- Bachelor in Secondary Education – Major in Filipino
- Bachelor in Secondary Education – Major in Mathematics
- Bachelor in Physical Education
- Bachelor in Secondary Education – Major in Social Studies

=== College of Information Technology Education ===
- Bachelor of Science in Computer Science
- Bachelor of Science in Information Technology

=== College of Business and Accountancy ===
- Bachelor of Science In Accountancy
- Bachelor of Science In Management Accounting
- Bachelor of Science in Business Administration – Major in Financial Management
- Bachelor of Science in Business Administration – Major in Marketing Management
- Bachelor of Science in Business Administration – Major in Human Resource Development Management

=== College of Nursing ===
- Bachelor of Science in Nursing

=== Graduate School (Independent Program) ===
- Master of Arts in English
- Master of Arts in Mathematics

=== Graduate School Extension of Notre Dame of Dadiangas University ===
- Ph.D. in Education
- Ph.D. in Language Education
- Ph.D. in Science Education – Major in Biology
- Master of Arts in Education
- Master of Arts in Engineering Education
- Master of Arts in Nursing
- Master in Public Administration
- Master in Business Administration

== Other Notre Dame Schools in the Philippines ==
- Notre Dame University – Cotabato City (NDU)
- Notre Dame of Marbel University (NDMU)
- Notre Dame of Jolo College (NDJC)
- Notre Dame of Dadiangas University (NDDU)
- Notre Dame of Greater Manila
- Notre Dame of Tacurong College (NDTC)
- Notre Dame of Midsayap College (NDMC)
