= Notre Dame of Cotabato =

Roman Catholic school in Cotabato City, Philippines

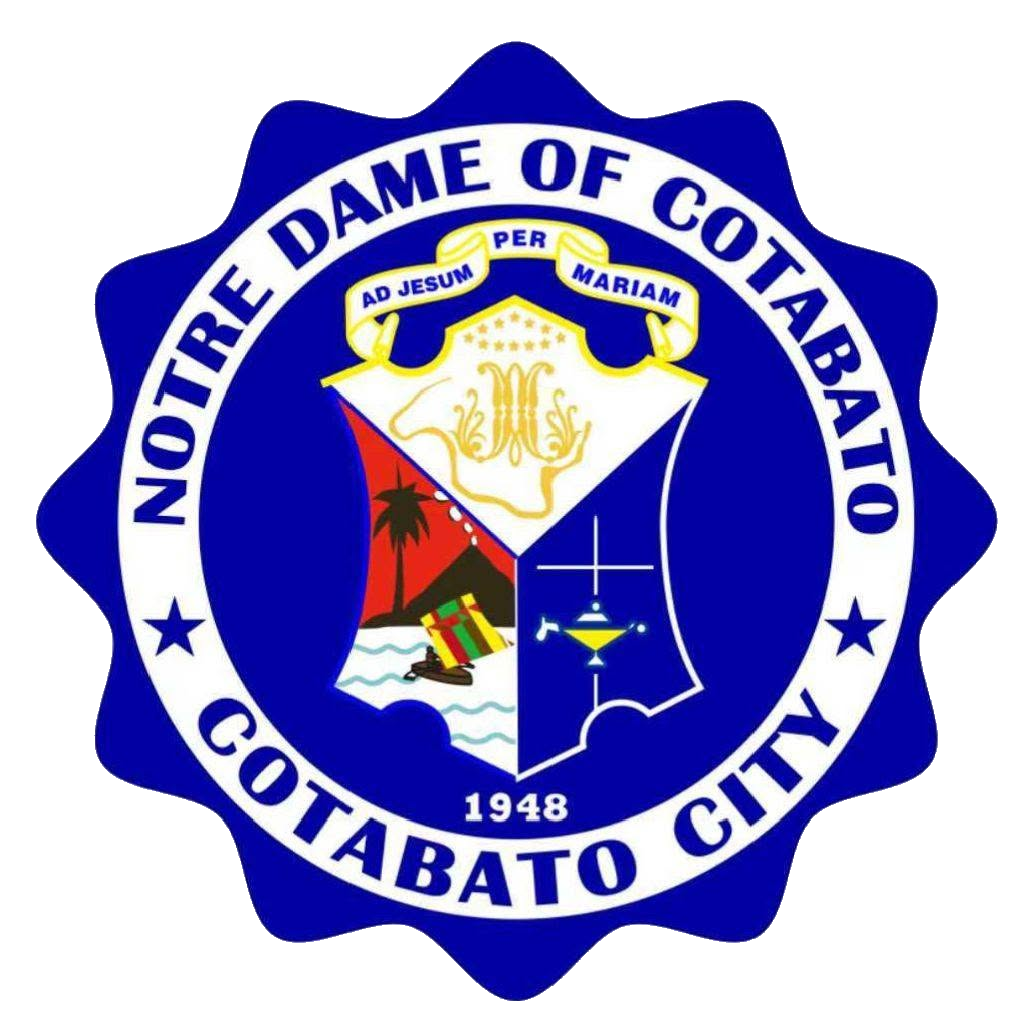
- Seal

Location
- 63 Sinsuat Avenue; Cotabato City, Maguindanao del Norte; Philippines
- 7°13′03″N 124°14′44″E

Information
- Type: Private school
- Motto: Ad Jesum per Mariam (Latin) To Jesus through Mary (English)
- Religious affiliations: Roman Catholic (Marist Brothers)
- Established: June 1948; 78 years ago
- Founder: Missionary Oblates of Mary Immaculate
- Director: Br. Jeff Rhey R. Antiquisa, FMS
- Principal: Anna Marie D. Piodena, EdD
- Color: Gold - White - Blue
- Affiliation: NDEA
- Website: ndc-marist.edu.ph

Notre Dame of Cotabato, colloquially known as NDC, and formerly known as Notre Dame of Cotabato Boys' Department, is a private Marist, Catholic, and Filipino school run by the Marist Brothers in Cotabato City, Maguindanao del Norte, Philippines. It was established in 1948.

== History ==
On 1941, Emile Boldoc of the Oblate Fathers (OMI) invited the Marist Brothers from the Province of United States to start an educational mission in Mindanao. The school building was already built around 1945 but because of World War II, the planned opening was delayed for a couple of years. After the war, four Marist Brothers namely, Br. Maurus James Doherty, FMS, Br. Herbert Daniel Dumont, FMS, Br. Joseph Damian Teston, FMS, and Br. Peter Leonard Thommen, FMS arrived in Cotabato in 1948. On June 21, 1948, the said four Marist Brothers took over the school from the Oblates, thus becoming the first Marist school in the Philippines.

The Religious of Virgin Mary (RVM) Sisters, who had been helping the Oblates in running the school, then took care of the girls' department (now Notre Dame – RVM College of Cotabato), while the Brothers has the boys' department, thus giving birth to Notre Dame of Cotabato (Boys' Department).

In June 1996, the school opened an afternoon shift program for boys and girls.

In June 2000, the school started to admit girls to the regular day shift session.

Notre Dame of Cotabato (or N.D.C.) is the only Marist School in Cotabato City.

== Basic Education Department ==
=== Junior High School ===
- Grade 7 to 10

=== Senior High School ===
- Grade 11 to 12

==== Academic Track ====
- Science, Technology, Engineering, and Mathematics
- Business and Entrepreneurship
- Arts, Social Science and Humanities
