= Notre Dame of Midsayap College =

Roman Catholic college in Cotabato, Philippines

- Dalubhasaang Notre Dame ng Midsayap (Filipino); Kolehiyong Notre Dame ng Midsayap
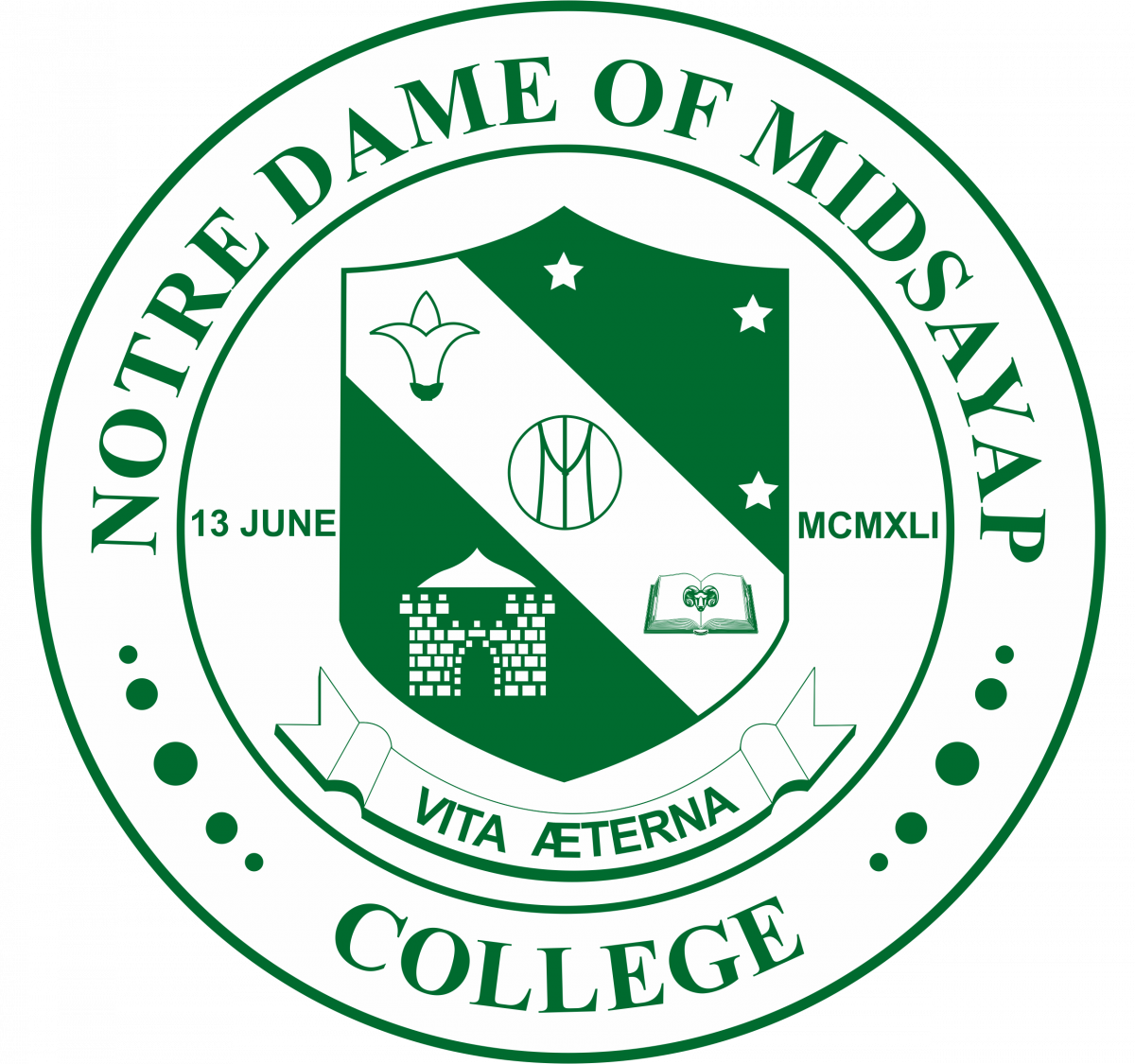
- Seal
- Former names: Notre Dame Academy in Midsayap (1941-1960)
- Motto: Vita Æterna (Latin)
- Motto in English: Eternal Life
- Type: Private Non-profit Basic and Higher education institution
- Established: 13 June 1941; 85 years ago
- Founder: Missionary Oblates of Mary Immaculate
- Religious affiliation: Roman Catholic (Oblates)
- Academic affiliations: NDEA, PAASCU, CEAP
- Chairman: Fr. Gerry Gamaliel S. Delos Reyes, OMI
- President: Fr. Ramon Maria G. Bernabe, OMI
- Vice-president: Engr. Ronniel D. Labio, MIT (VP Academic Affairs); Noel E. Cacanindin, CPA (VP Finance); Genevieve O. Torino, DBM (VP Administration)
- Principal: Chinitt P. Sinco, LPT, MIB (Integrated Basic Education)
- Location: Quezon Avenue, Poblacion 5, Midsayap, Cotabato, Philippines; 7°11′38″N 124°32′03″E
- Hymn: Notre Dame, Our Mother; Notre Dame March
- Colors
- Nickname: Rams
- Sporting affiliations: NDEA Meet, PRISAA, COPRISA
- Website: www.ndmc.edu.ph
- Location in Mindanao Location in the Philippines

Notre Dame of Midsayap College (Filipino: Dalubhasaang Notre Dame ng Midsayap or Kolehiyong Notre Dame ng Midsayap), colloquially known as NDMC or simply Notre Dame, is a private, Catholic basic and higher education institution run by the Missionary Oblates of Mary Immaculate in Midsayap, Cotabato, Philippines. Established by the Oblates on 13 June 1941 making it as the First Notre Dame School in Asia and in the Philippines, it was the first in the long list of schools named Notre Dame in the Philippines that form the Notre Dame Educational Association under the patronage of the Blessed Virgin Mary, the school Patroness and St. Eugene De Mazenod as the school's patron saint.

== History ==
It was Fr. Joseph Boyd, OMI, who suggested the name NOTRE DAME in honor of Our Lady. Hence, in July 1941, the NOTRE DAME ACADEMY in Midsayap opened its doors. It was the first in the long list of schools named Notre Dame in the Philippines which today number 194 and form the Notre Dame Educational Association.

Fr. Edward Gordon, OMI was appointed the first Director and Mother Ma. Isabel Purification, RVM was the first principal. The school opened two first year and two second year sections in a four-room building of wood, sawali and bamboo. Fr. Gil Beaudoin, OMI, Mrs. Rosario Medina and Mrs. Milagros Penson completed the teaching staff. The outbreak of World War II on December 8, 1941 put an end to this project.

A big leap forward was taken on June 13, 1960 with the opening of the collegiate department with Father Charles Prass, OMI, as the first Rector. On June 11, 1961, the Elementary Training Department started operation as the laboratory school of the college. Another milestone was the offering of high school classes at night on July 1, 1966 to serve those who work in the day. This was the contribution of OMI Fathers Thomas Lenert and Ernest Sylvestre. In 1966–1967, the Notre Dame High School for Girls known now as St. Mary's Academy of Midsayap was turned over to the RVM Sisters.

School Year 1990–1991 was the Golden Year. The Jubilee Endowment Fund called GIFTS (Golden Investment Fund for Teachers, Staff and Students) came into being. The two-fold purpose was to improve personnel salaries and to minimize tuition fee increases.

During the School Year 1991–1992, the College undertook the Strategic Planning Workshop (SPW). The SPW was a thorough process which surfaced the following targets: Organizational Stability, Quality Education and Financial Viability. In the implementation of SPW recommendations, the College was at the same engaged in more preparations for the next accreditation level.

On August 6, 1989, Notre Dame of Midsayap College was granted Level I accreditation for its three programs, namely, Liberal Arts, Teachers College and Commerce. This was the result of the long preparation which started in School-Year 1983–1984 with the Preliminary Visit of a team of Philippine Accrediting Association of Schools, Colleges and Universities (PAASCU) accreditors headed by Fr. Bellarmine Baltazar, OSB. This was followed by the First Formal Visit of February, 1989 with Ms. Concepcion Rosales as the team leader. The PAASCU second visit was on February 10–11, 1994 and the Level Accreditation was granted on March 25, 1996.

School Year 1996–1997 found Notre Dame of Midsayap College launching into computerization. Modular Training Programs were offered to personnel and external clientele. Computer units were also acquired for the computer laboratory of the Elementary and High School Units.

In response to the changing trends and demands of time, in school year 2001–2002 the School had opened the Community College now known as De Mazenod School of Science and Technology (DMSST) offering formal and non-formal programs accredited by Technical Education Skills Development Authority (TESDA). The PAASCU resurvey visit on February 17–18, 2005 resulted favorable in re-accrediting the college until May 2010. Two years later, the school celebrated its diamond jubilee anniversary with a concert featuring Yeng Constantino, Sam Concepcion, and Reymond Sajor.

The College has put emphasis on activities that seek to enhance the appreciation, preservation and enrichment of the students' Filipino heritage and to encourage the development of other potentials to enable them to do their part in the task of nation-building.

== Programs ==
=== Graduate School ===
- Master of Arts in Education Major in Educational Administration
- Master in Business Administration (Thesis and Non-Thesis Program)

=== Tertiary ===
College of Arts and Sciences

- Bachelor of Arts in Communication
- Bachelor in Human Services
- Bachelor of Public Administration (PAASCU Level I)
- Bachelor of Science in Social Work
- Bachelor of Science in Psychology

==== College of Business and Accountancy ====
- Bachelor of Science in Accountancy (PAASCU Level II)
- Bachelor of Science in Business Administration (PAASCU Level II)
  - Major in Financial Management
  - Major in Marketing Management
  - Major in Human Resource Management
- Bachelor of Science in Hospitality Management

==== College of Criminal Justice Education ====
- Bachelor of Science in Criminology (PAASCU Level I)
- Bachelor of Forensic Science
- Bachelor of Science in Industrial Security Management

==== College of Education ====
- Bachelor of Secondary Education
  - Major in Filipino
  - Major in English
  - Major in Science
  - Major in Mathematics
  - Major in Social Studies
- Bachelor of Elementary Education (PAASCU Level II)
- Bachelor of Technical-Vocational Teacher Education
  - Major in Food Service Management
- Bachelor of Physical Education
- Bachelor of Technology and Livelihood Education
  - Major in Home Economics

==== College of Information Technology and Engineering ====
- Bachelor of Science in Electronics Communication Engineering
- Bachelor of Science in Computer Engineering (PAASCU Level I)
- Bachelor of Science in Information Technology (PAASCU Level II)
- Bachelor of Science in Information Systems (PAASCU Level I)

==== College of Nursing ====
- Bachelor of Science in Nursing

== Other Notre Dame Schools in the Philippines ==
- Notre Dame University - Cotabato City (NDU)
- Notre Dame of Marbel University (NDMU)
- Notre Dame of Jolo College (NDJC)
- Notre Dame of Kidapawan College (NDKC)
- Notre Dame of Greater Manila (NDGM)
- Notre Dame of Tacurong College (NDTC)
- Notre Dame of Dadiangas University (NDDU)
- Notre Dame of Kabacan Inc (NDKI)

== Athletics ==
Notre Dame's teams are known as the Rams. In high school basketball, they qualified for the NBTC National Finals from 2017 to 2018. They also qualified for the 2024 NBTC National Finals. In 2020, they represented Region 12 in the national PRISAA tournament, and had won the Mindanao regional PRISAA tournament for five straight years.

In 2018, Notre Dame was the host of the first-ever Oblate Schools Cultural-Athletic Association (OSCAA) Meet.

== Notable alumni ==
- Rey Mark G. "Mac" Belo - is a professional basketball player who was drafted by the Blackwater Elite of the Philippine Basketball Association (PBA).
- Delfin Lorenzana - previously served as Secretary of National Defense in the Cabinet of President Rodrigo Duterte
