= Notre Dame of Dadiangas University =

Roman Catholic college in General Santos, Philippines

- Pamantasang Notre Dame ng Dadiangas (Filipino)
- Former name: Notre Dame of Dadiangas/ND Dadiangas (1953–1959) Notre Dame of Dadiangas College (1959–2006)
- Motto: Fidei Excellentia (Latin)
- Motto in English: Faith in Excellence
- Type: Private Research; Non-profit Basic and Higher education institution
- Established: 1953; 73 years ago
- Founder: Marist Brothers of the Schools
- Religious affiliation: Roman Catholic (Marist Brothers)
- Academic affiliations: NDEA, PAASCU
- President: Br. Manuel V. de Leon, F.M.S.
- Students: ~8905
- Location: Marist Ave., General Santos, South Cotabato, Philippines; 6°07′05″N 125°10′18″E
- Campus: Main Campus Marist Avenue Gen Santos Satellite Campuses 29 hectares (290,000 m^{2}); Barangay Lagao; Espina, Barangay Labangal; Barangay Glamang, Polomolok, South Cotabato
- Hymn: A Life of Thanksgiving; Notre Dame, Our Mother (Notre Dame Hymn); Notre Dame March
- Patroness: Blessed Virgin Mary
- Colors: Green and Gold
- Nickname: Kingfishers
- Website: www.nddu.edu.ph
- Location in Mindanao Location in the Philippines

The Notre Dame of Dadiangas University (NDDU), also known as Notre Dame, is a private Catholic basic and higher education institution run by the Marist Brothers of the Schools or FMS (Fratres Maristae a Scholis) in General Santos, South Cotabato, Philippines. It was founded by the Marist Brothers in 1953 and offers undergraduate, graduate, and post-graduate programs as well as primary and secondary education. It consists of four campuses in General Santos and Polomolok, South Cotabato; The main campus along Marist Avenue, the Lagao Campus where the Notre Dame of Dadiangas University-Integrated Basic Education Department (NDDU-IBED) is located, the Espina Campus, and Glamang Campus where the College of Engineering, Architecture, and Technology is located. NDDU is currently the only private university in the city of General Santos.

Under the CHED Memorandum Order No. 48, the school was granted university status on June 26, 2006.

== Affiliations ==
As a Marist institution, Notre Dame of Dadiangas University is affiliated with the Marist Schools in the Philippines and linked internationally with University of Alcalá, Spain, Universidad Marista, A.C. Mexico City, Universidad Marista, Guadalajara, Mexico, Pontifícia Universidade Católica do Paraná and Universidad Marista, De San Luis Potosí, Mexico.

The university is a member of Notre Dame Educational Association, Inc. (NDEA), a network of schools named Notre Dame in the Philippines, which is under the patronage of the Blessed Virgin Mary,

== Colleges ==
- Business College
- College of Health Sciences
- College of Education, Arts and Sciences
- College of Engineering, Architecture, and Technology

== Notable alumni ==
- Manny Pacquiao (First Year College only), boxer, politician, basketball coach
- Bo Perasol (High School Graduate), basketball coach
- Carlos Isagani Zarate (College Graduate), politician

== Other Notre Dame Schools in the Philippines ==
- Notre Dame University - Cotabato City (NDU)
- Notre Dame of Marbel University (NDMU)
- Notre Dame of Jolo College (NDJC)
- Notre Dame of Kidapawan College (NDKC)
- Notre Dame of Greater Manila (NDGM)
- Notre Dame of Tacurong College (NDTC)
- Notre Dame of Midsayap College (NDMC)

== See also ==
- List of Marist Brothers schools
