= Collège Notre-Dame (Haiti) =

Private Catholic school in Cap-Haïtien, Haiti

Coordinates: 19°45′32.14″N 72°12′20.79″W

Collège Notre-Dame du Perpétuel Secours

Information
- Funding type: Private school
- Religious affiliation(s): Catholicism
- Established: 1904; 121 years ago
- Gender: Boys
- Enrollment: c.1,000
- Website: cndps.pndps.education

Collège Notre-Dame du Perpétuel Secours is an all-male private Roman Catholic primary and secondary school founded by the Congregation of Holy Cross in Cap-Haïtien, Haiti in 1904.

== Overview ==
When the school was established, it was named after the patroness of the diocese. Four secular Catholic priests presided over it, as well as the Brothers of Christian Instruction, who also supervised several other religious and educational institutions throughout the Republic of Haiti. The school also has a long history with the island's religious and political figures, archbishops and presidents. Former President of Haiti Jean-Bertrand Aristide was educated at the school.

== Facilities ==
The school is located on a 60-acre (240,000 square meters) campus close to the city of Cap-Haïtien and hosts 1,000 students. Potential students are required to take an entrance exam.

The campus is affiliated with the Boy Scouts of Troupe Henri Christophe, named after one of heroes of the Haitian Revolution.

The school focusses on academic achievement with over 90% of students attending higher education. It is also known for athletics, particularly in football and basketball.
