= Notre Dame University (Philippines) =

Roman Catholic university in Cotabato City, Philippines

- Pamantasang Notre Dame (Filipino)
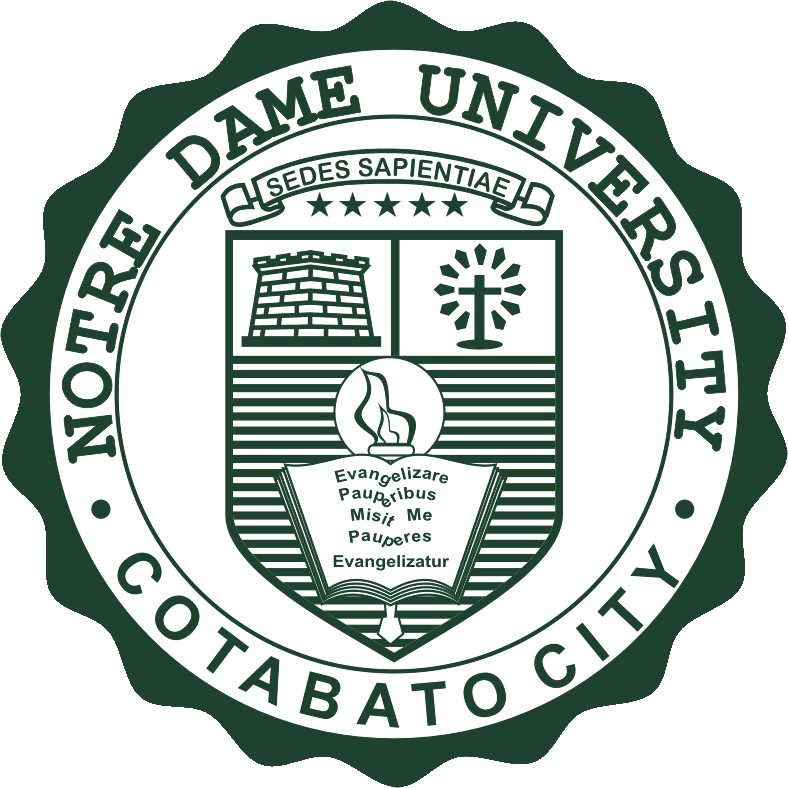
- Former name: Notre Dame College (1948–1969)
- Motto: Sedes Sapientiae (Latin)
- Motto in English: Seat of Wisdom
- Type: Private non-profit basic and higher education institution
- Established: 1948; 78 years ago
- Founder: Missionary Oblates of Mary Immaculate
- Religious affiliation: Roman Catholic (Oblates)
- Academic affiliations: NDEA, PAASCU
- Chairman: Gerry Gamaliel Delos Reyes
- President: Francis Efren Zabala
- Vice-president: Ronald Mamaril (Finance and administration); Delma Yuarata (Academic affairs)
- Location: Cotabato, Philippines; 7°12′55″N 124°14′59″E
- Colors: Green and White
- Website: www.ndu.edu.ph
- Location in Mindanao Location in the Philippines

Notre Dame University (NDU) is a private Catholic research basic and higher education institution run by the Missionary Oblates of Mary Immaculate in Cotabato, Philippines. It was founded by the Oblates in 1948 and has been a member of the Notre Dame Educational Association, a group of schools in the Philippines named Notre Dame. The Association is under the patronage of the Blessed Virgin Mary.

Notre Dame University has academic programs in graduate school, law, liberal arts, arts and sciences, engineering, nursing, accountancy, business administration, computer studies and education, as well as secondary, elementary, and preparatory education.

== History ==
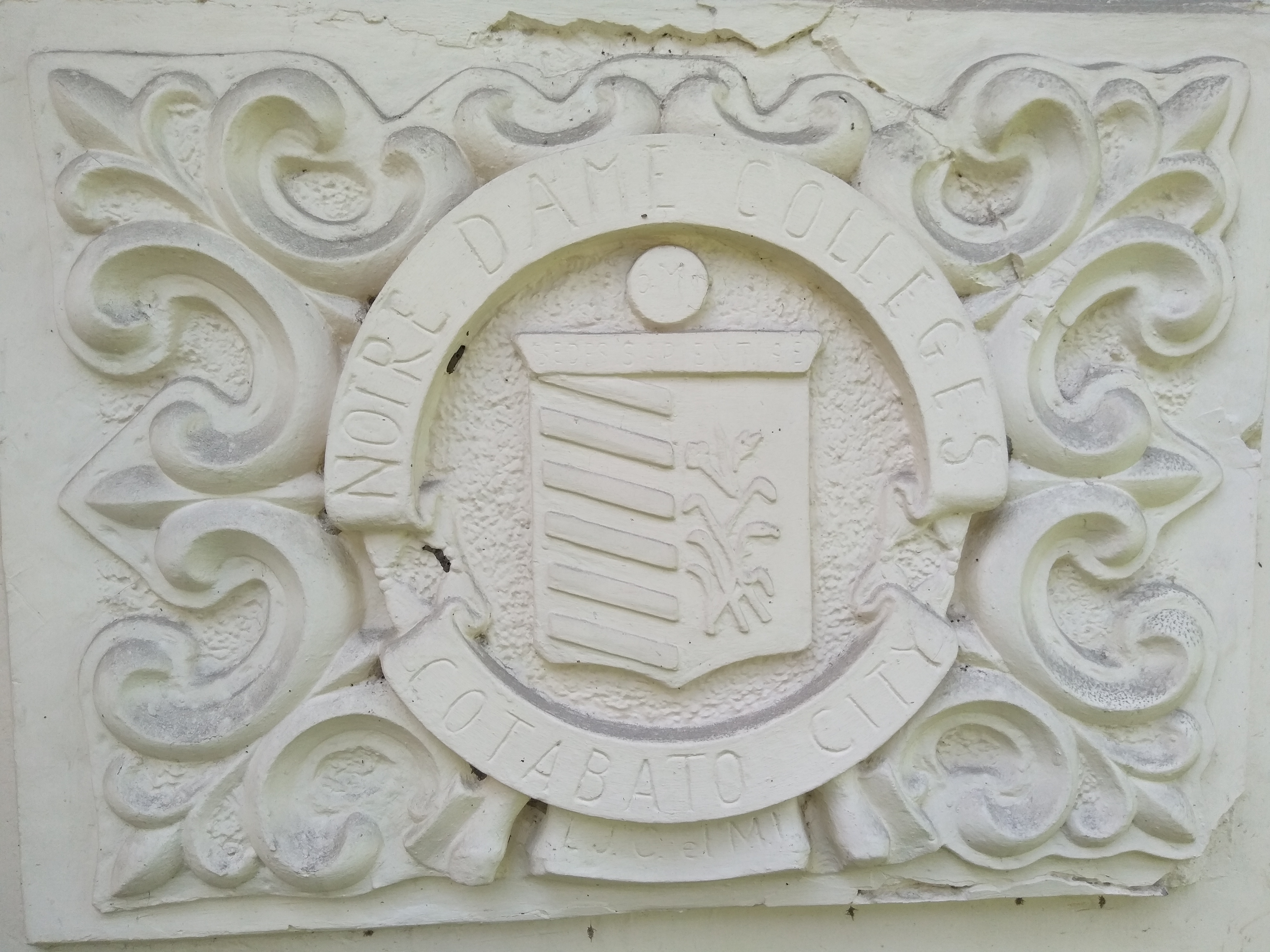
Notre Dame College Seal

The college was founded in 1948, and was the first college in the province. Robert E. Sullivan was its first Rector and Dean. When it opened, there were only 128 students and a pioneering faculty of eight, with classes being held at the Notre Dame of Cotabato Girls Department building the first year. The college obtained its own building the following year.

Complete elementary education was offered later with the establishment of the Notre Dame Training Department, envisioned to be a teaching laboratory for Education students majoring in Elementary Education.

With the increase in enrollment, a new school was needed. On February 27, 1959, the cornerstone-laying and blessing of the present University site was held with no less than the Very Rev. Leo Deschatelets, OMI, Superior General of the Oblates, presiding over the ceremony.

The college received its University status on March 11, 1969. In 1980, The Philippine Association of Schools, Colleges and Universities (PAASCU) certified the Level I accreditation of the three colleges of the University, the College of Arts and Sciences, the College of Commerce and the Teachers' College.

In the same year, the Core Curriculum was introduced integrating both Christian and Islamic Values in all core subjects taken by the students.

In 1983, a program towards a doctoral degree in the field of Education, major in Peace and Development Education was introduced.

In school year 1997-98, the University, in cooperation with the Mindanao Advanced Education Project (MAEP) of the Commission on Higher Education, offered a Doctor of Philosophy (Ph.D.) in Peace and Development Education and Master of Arts (M.A.) in Peace and Development Education.

In 2001, NDU was afforded a deregulated status by the Commission on Higher Education. Hence, NDU enjoys the following benefits: Issuance of Special Order, Deregulated Monitoring/ Evaluation of CHED, Access to Subsidies/ Assistance, Curricular Prescriptions, and Conferring Honoris Causa.

== Facility ==
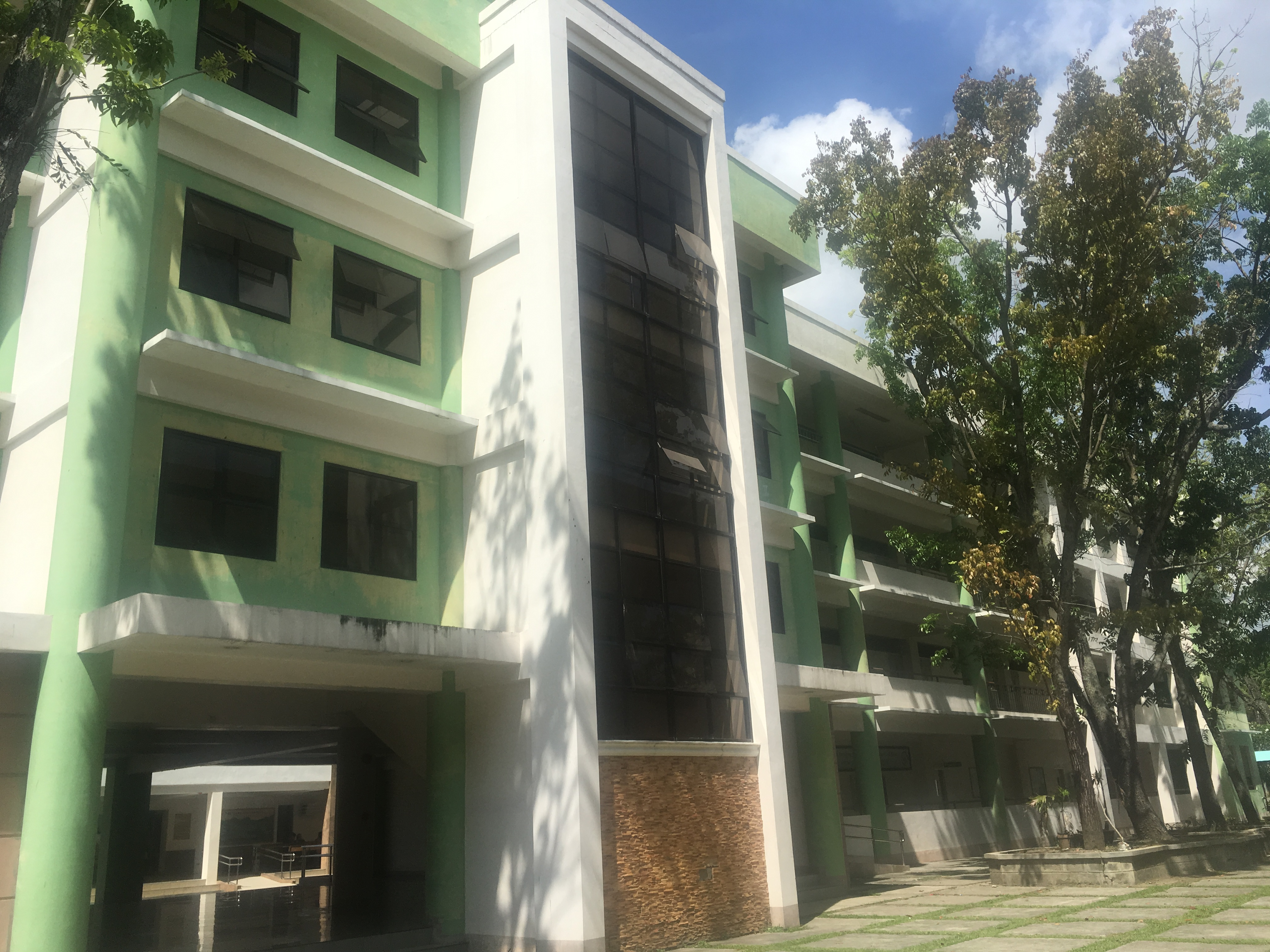
Cariño Building, 4 storey academic building

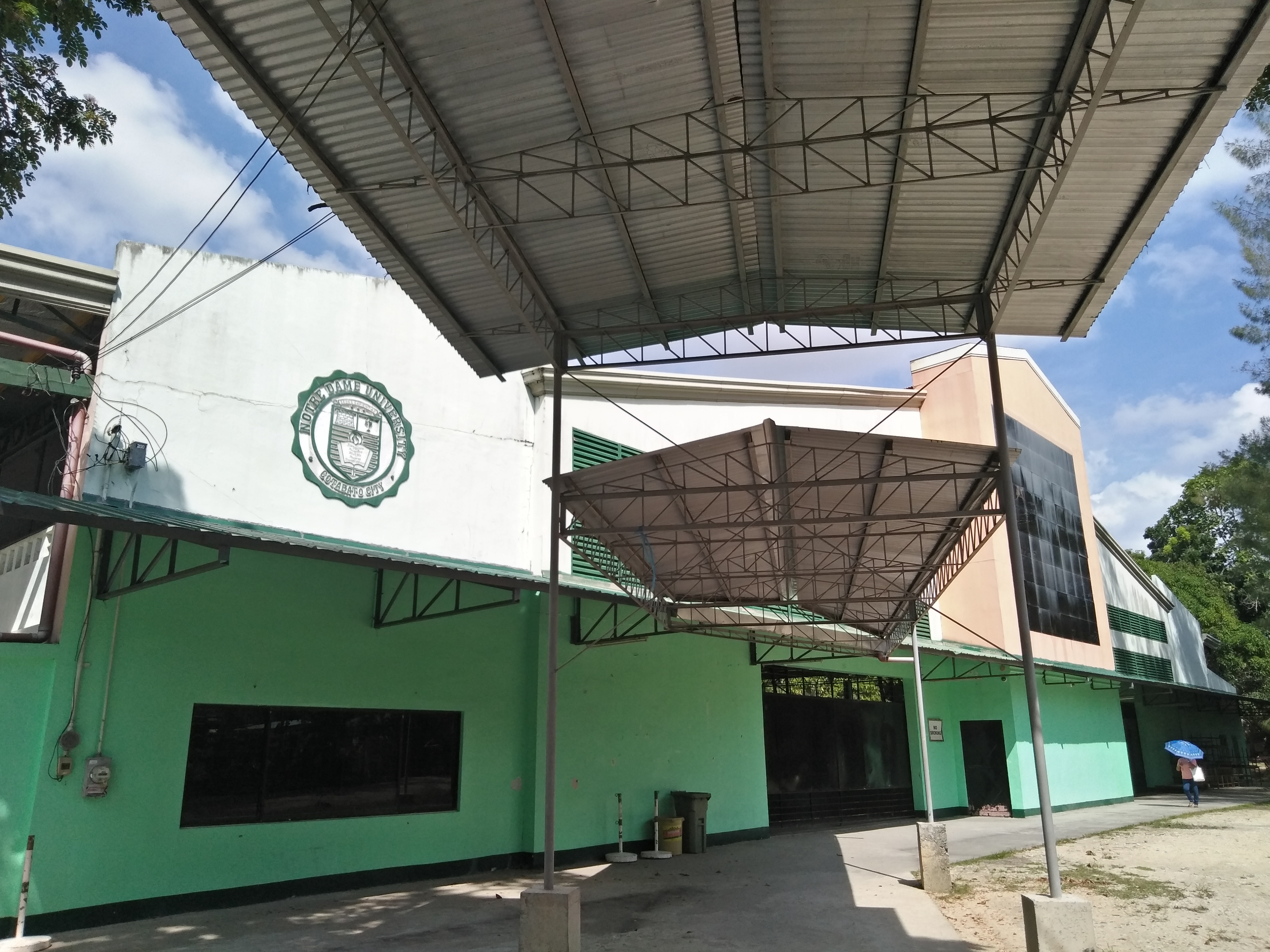
University Gymnasium

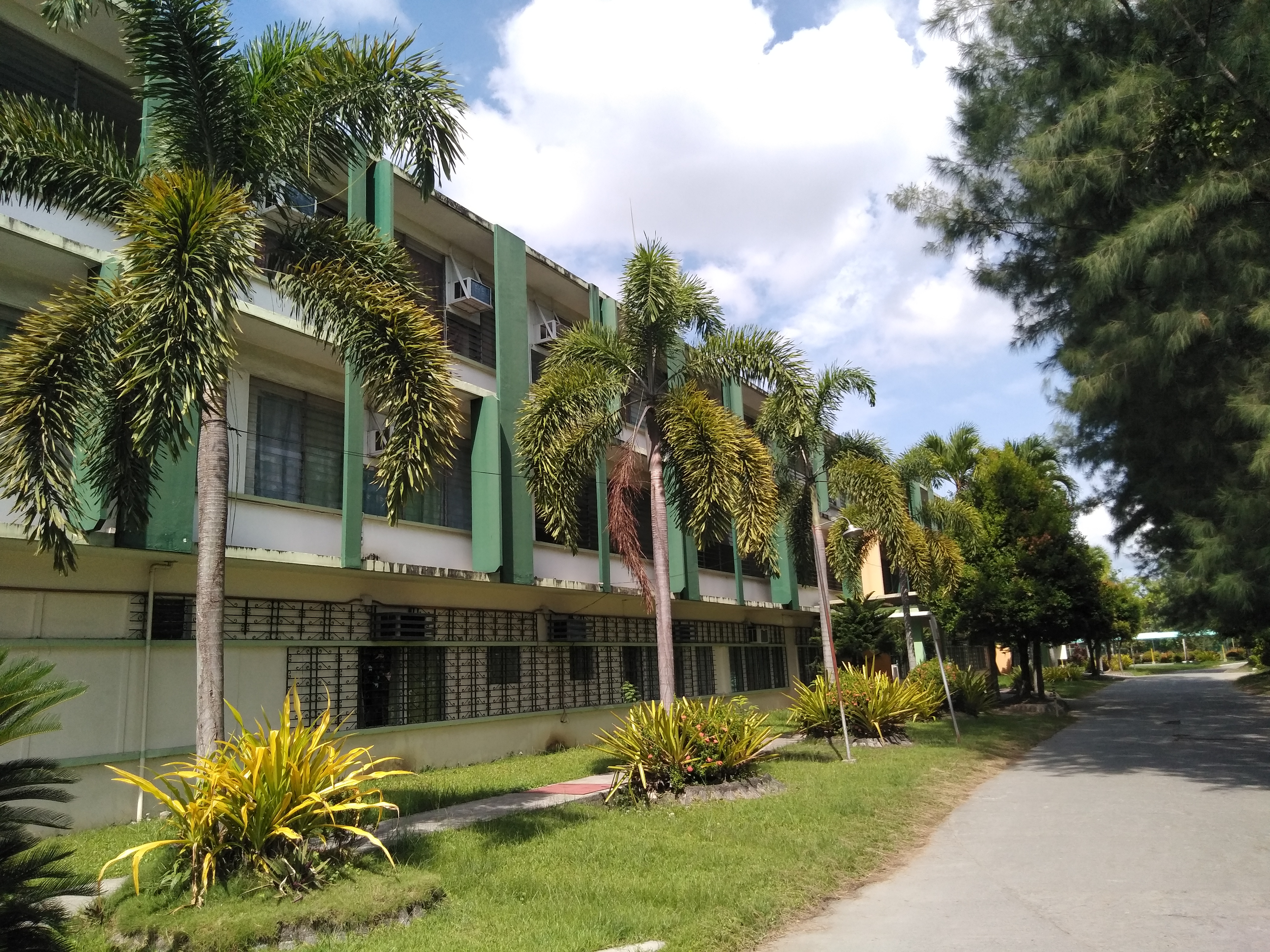
Burke Building, The Main Academic Building

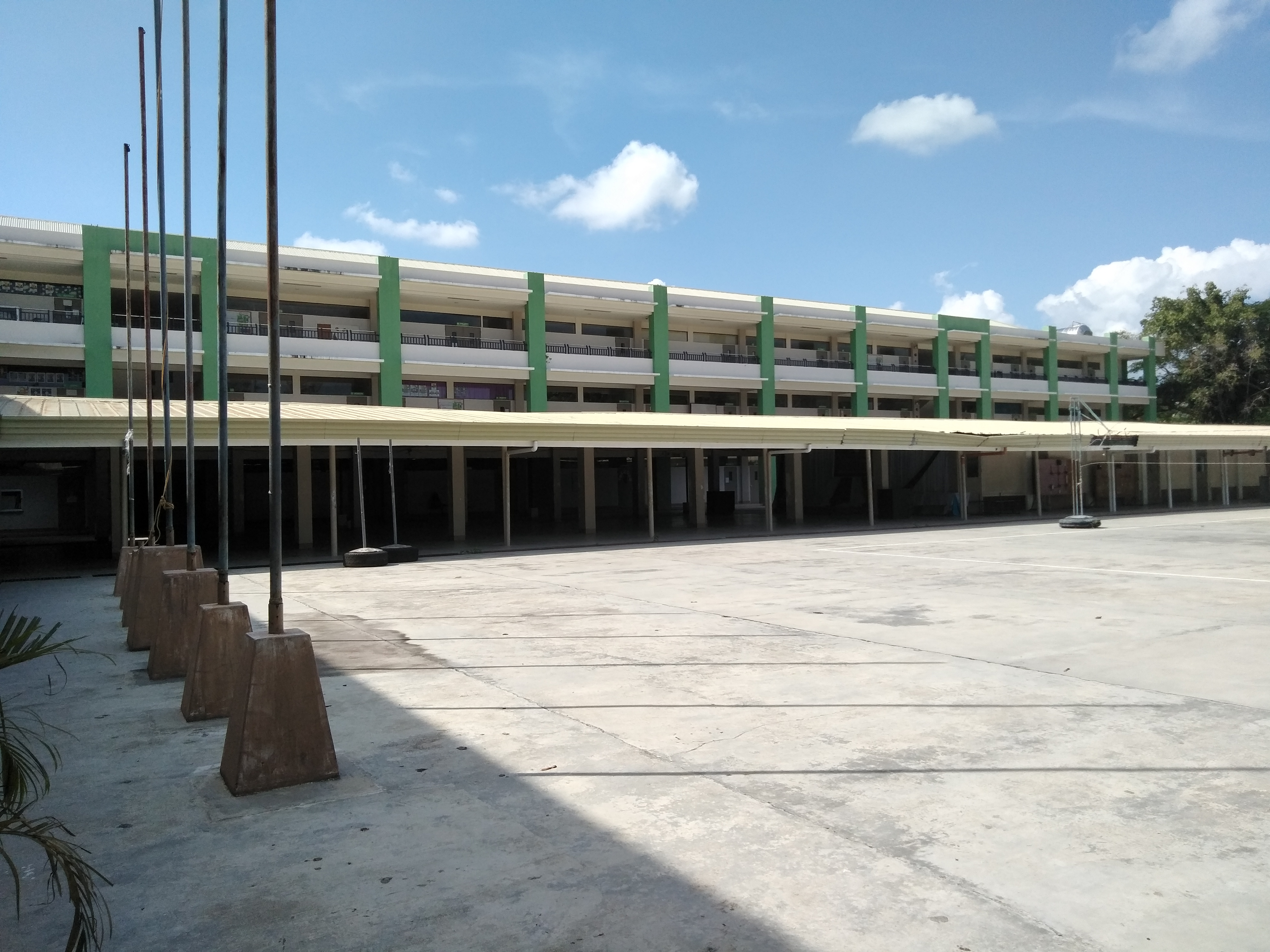
Junior Highschool Building

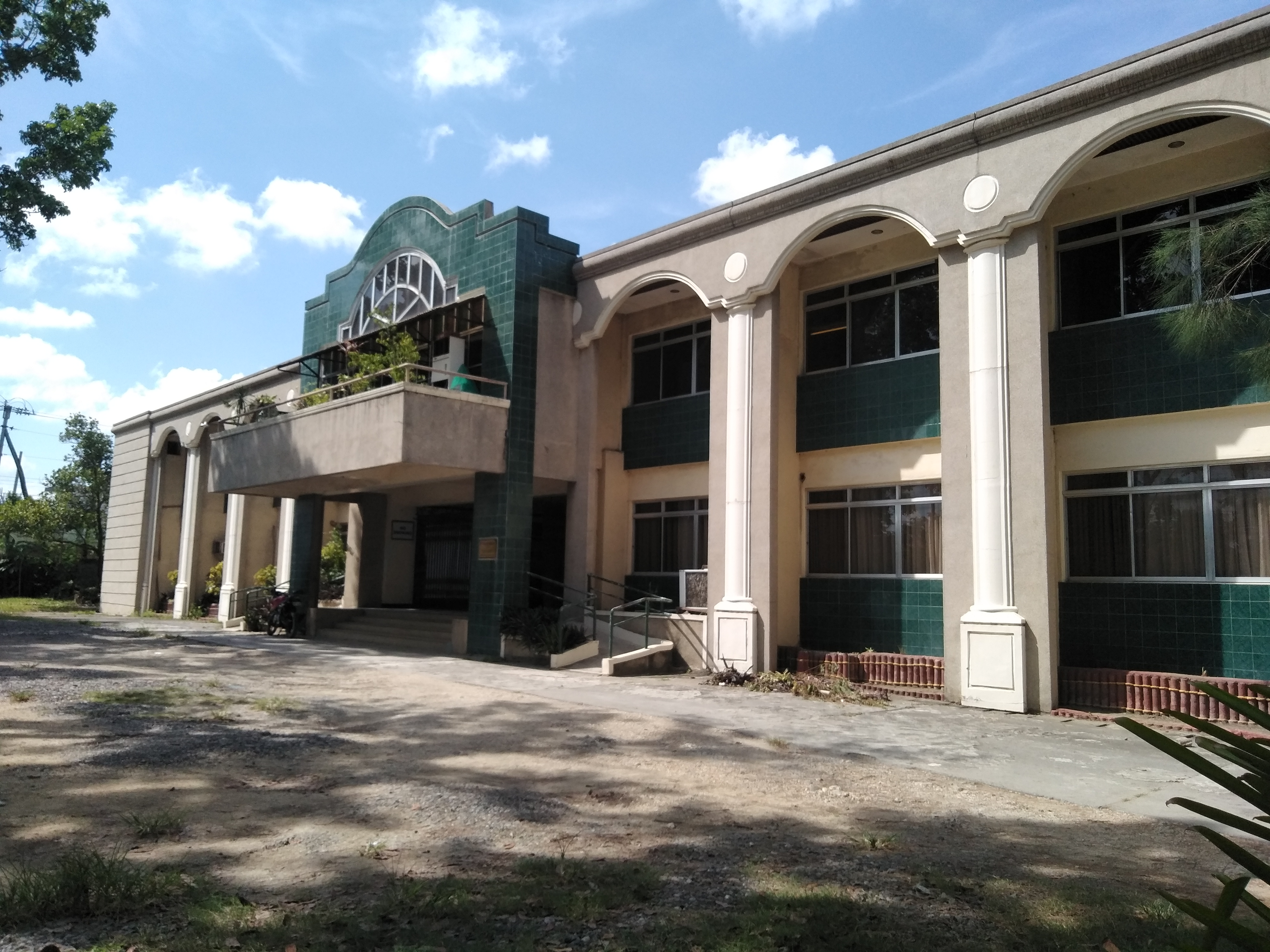
Nepomoceno building, The College of Law

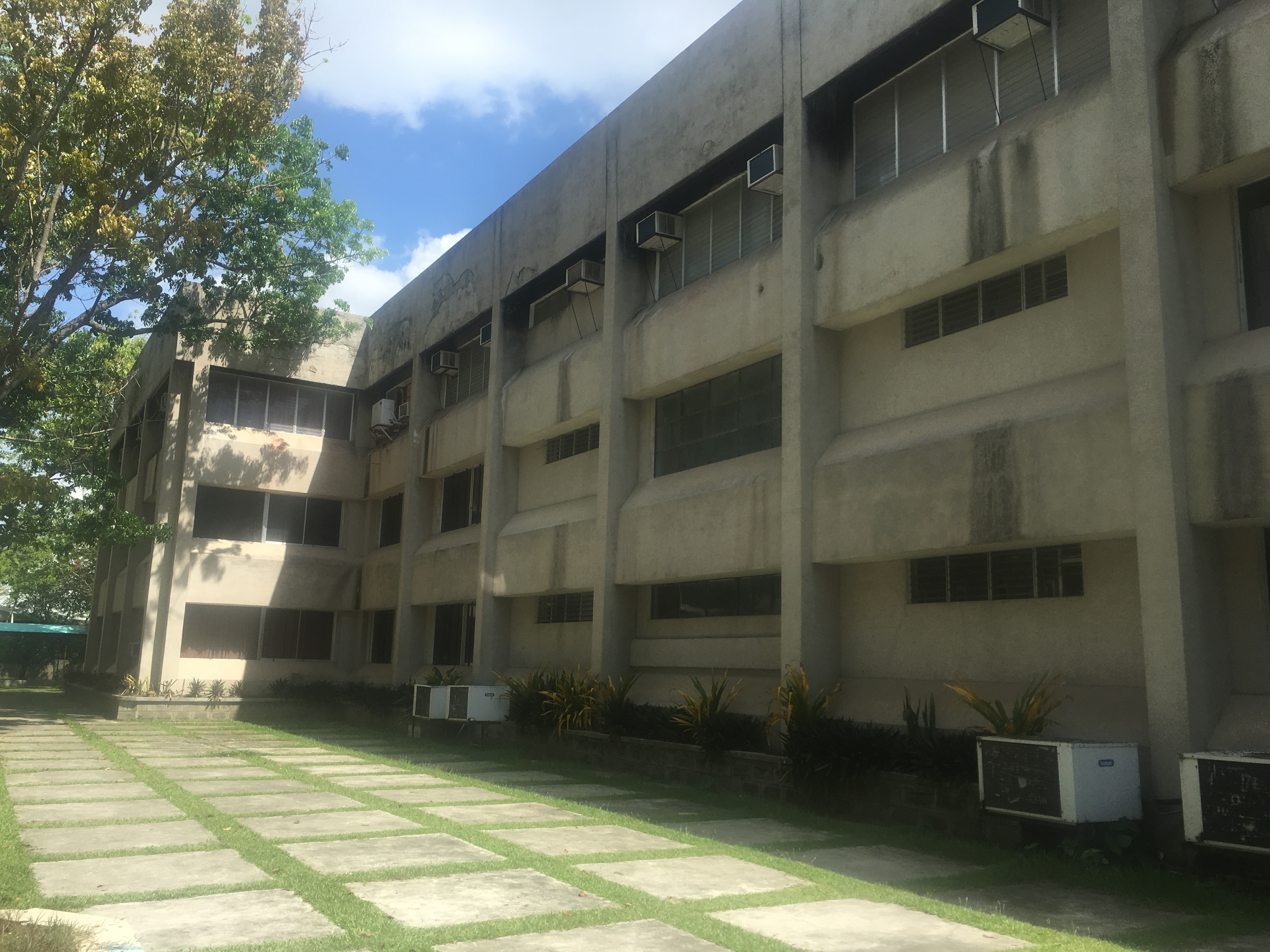
Back view of Main Library Building

== Other schools in Philippines named Notre Dame ==
- Notre Dame of Dadiangas University
- Notre Dame of Marbel University
- Notre Dame of Kidapawan College
- Notre Dame of Midsayap College
- Notre Dame of Tacurong College
- Notre Dame of Greater Manila
- Notre Dame – RVM College of Cotabato
- Notre Dame of Salaman College
- Notre Dame of Jolo College
- Notre Dame of Cagayan - Mapun, Tawi-Tawi

== See also ==
- Cotabato State University
