= Notre Dame, Our Mother =

School song of the University of Notre Dame

"Notre Dame, Our Mother" is the official song of the University of Notre Dame, a private Catholic research university in Notre Dame, Indiana. The song is addressed to "Notre Dame", a reference to both the university and its patroness and namesake, Mary, the Mother of Jesus. Joseph Casasanta, the band director from 1923 to 1942 who also arranged the Notre Dame Victory March, composed the music. It was first performed publicly in fall 1931.

Charles O'Donnell, president of the university at the time of composition, wrote the song's lyrics in honor of Mary. It is part of the post-game show of the Band of the Fighting Irish and is the traditional conclusion to Notre Dame sporting events and major religious services. At the end of every football game, Fighting Irish players join students in singing the song.
