= Notre Dame of Marbel University =

Roman Catholic university in South Cotabato, Philippines

- Pamantasang Notre Dame ng Marbel (Filipino)
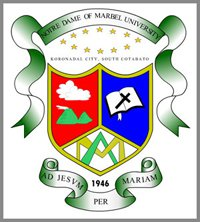
- Former names: Notre Dame of Marbel High School (1945–1955); Notre Dame of Marbel College (1955–1992)
- Motto: Ad Jesum Per Mariam (Latin)
- Motto in English: All to Jesus through Mary
- Type: Private Research; Non-profit Co-educational Basic and Higher education institution
- Established: 1945; 81 years ago
- Founder: Francis McSorley
- Religious affiliation: Roman Catholic (Marist Brothers)
- Academic affiliations: NDEA; ACUP; PAASCU
- President: Bro. Paterno Corpus, FMS
- Vice-president: Joan Palma (Academic Vice-President); Atty. Rene M. Barrion (Acting Administrative Vice-President)
- Principal: Leann Jester Rosali (Senior High School); Allan Sumadic (Elementary and Junior High School)
- Director: Bro. Noel Fernandez, FMS
- Location: Alunan Avenue, City of Koronadal, South Cotabato, Philippines; 6°29′46″N 124°50′30″E
- Alma Mater song: University Hymn
- Patron saint: Saint Marcellin Champagnat
- Colors: Gold and Green
- Mascot: Golden Stallion
- Website: www.ndmu.edu.ph
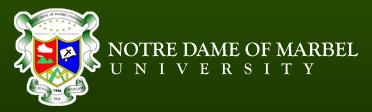

- Location in Mindanao Location in the Philippines

Notre Dame of Marbel University, also known by its acronym NDMU, is a private Catholic educational institution run by the Marist Brothers in City of Koronadal, South Cotabato, Philippines. It was founded in 1945 and offers pre-school, elementary, high school, college and postgraduate courses. It is the only university in Koronadal and considered the premier university in South Cotabato, with NDMU Library being one of largest in southern Mindanao. It became the first Marist university in the country in 1992, and is a member of the Notre Dame Educational Association, a network of Notre Dame schools in the Philippines under the patronage of the Blessed Virgin Mary.

== History and timeline ==
Rev. Francis McSorley, OMI founded Notre Dame of Marbel High School immediately after World War II to cater to the educational needs of settlers in the Koronadal Valley. It was the first high school in the area.

- 1949 – The first graduation exercises of Notre Dame of Marbel High School (NDM) had 37 men and 16 women finish.
- 1950 – Brother Edmund Conrad Paradis, FMS took over direction of the boys, while Mother María Ronquillo, RVM oversaw the girls. Fr. Matthew Casey, OMI remained school director.
- 1951 – The Marist Brothers took complete control over management and ownership of NDM from the Oblate Fathers (OMI). Paradis became Director-Principal for both the boys and girls department. The Religious of the Virgin Mary (RVM) nuns left the management of the girls was later handled by the Siena Sisters at the beginning of the school year 1959–1953.
- 1952 – Paradis and Mother Josefina Burgos, Prioress-General of the Siena Sisters, signed a contract to build a permanent library and administration centre, the cost split 50-50 and occupying the boundary of their respective properties. This would become the first cement-and-cinderblock building of the campus. The Siena Sisters’ end became the Notre Dame of Marbel Girls' Department. The Marist Brothers continued to handle what was called the Notre Dame of Marbel Boys’ Department.
- 1954 – The Marist Brothers’ residence of cement and cinderblock was completed and blessed by Fr. Marcy, SJ, during the annual retreat of the Brothers.
- 1955 – Opening of the college department with course offerings in Education, Liberal Arts, Pre-Law, Pre-Nursing, Commerce, and Secretarial. Brother Herbert Dumont, FMS, was its founder and first dean. The school was renamed Notre Dame of Marbel College, becoming coeducational except for the high school department.
- 1957 – The first graduation exercises of Notre Dame of Marbel College saw 89 graduates: 78 CSS, 8 AA general, and 3 AA Pre-Law (56 CSS had graduated earlier on 15 May 1956).
- 1962-1964 – Opening of the elementary department for boys with Brother Regis Xavier Creegan, FMS, as the first Principal, with the initial batch from the Girl's Elementary first through fourth grades. The Siena Sisters retained control of the fifth and sixth grades, with the eventual phasing out of female students to retain and admit only boys.
- 1964 – The first elementary graduation exercises occurred under the Marist Brothers, with a class of 26 boys and 15 girls. These pupils began schooling with the Siena Sisters.
- 1965 – Completion of the two-storey concrete college building, now the SLR Hall, containing the library, laboratories, and classrooms.
- 1966-1967 – The first time “President” became the title for the head of NDMC. Brother Norman J. Roy, FMS, was the first President, serving for two years.
- 1967 – NDMC was chosen as one of the center colleges of NDEA for the new faculty development program, training teachers of both public and private schools in various subject areas.
- 1967 – Opening of the Graduate School of Education, with offerings in Master of Arts in Education, major in Educational Administration. The initial batch had 44 students; Brother Joseph Damian Teston, FMS was its founder and first dean.
- 1968 – First PAASCU accreditation of the three programs: Education, Commerce, Liberal Arts.
- 1969 – First graduation exercises for the Graduate School with one candidate: Mercedes Amoroso, MA in Educational Administration.
- 1970 – Opening of Master of Arts in Teaching: Mathematics, Biology, Physics, Chemistry, and Natural Science. NDMC accepted becoming the Regional Science Teaching Center (RSTC), housed in a new annexe.
- 1973 – Opening of the Mindanao Institute for Development of School Administrators (MIDSA), a three-year scholarship grant from The Asia Foundation and the Filipinas Foundation for the MA program of 31 high school administrators from Agusan del Norte, Agusan del Sur, South Cotabato, Sultan Kudarat, Maguindanao, North Cotabato, Lanao del Sur, and Davao City. Opening of the apprenticeship program for training out-of-school youth, funded by The Asia Foundation (MTTP).
- 1975 – Launching of EAMA, a 21-month masters program for 27 participants from various ethnic groups across Mindanao.
- 1976 – Construction began on the NDMC gymnasium by MCDC. In late 1976, NDMC became one of the two NDEA Regional Development Centers (RSDC). It trained teachers in Communication Arts, and assisted in the textbook project of the Education Program Implementing Task Force (EDPITAF).
- 1978 – NDMC was chosen as one of six Notre Dame colleges in South Cotabato to pilot-test the Circuit Rider Program, an on-site upgrading of teachers’ competence through mobile teams of local subject experts in communication arts, science and mathematics. It also began the Para-Teachers Program for elementary school teachers in cultural community areas of Maguindanao, Sultan Kudarat, and South Cotabato, and a PAASCU accreditation resurvey of the colleges of Commerce, Education, and Liberal Arts.
- 1980 – The first kindergarten graduation exercises were held for 72 boys.
- 1981 – Development of the 15-hectare Demonstration Farm in Barangay Paraiso, Koronadal, for training, field demonstration, and practicum of agriculture students. It also became the dispersal center for goats to local farmers.
- 1982 – Start of the Dairy Goat Dispersal project at the Demonstration Farm, with an initial grant from Oxfam.
- 1983 – Construction of a three-storey, 14-classroom building to serve the growing college population. It was meant to house the engineering classes and laboratory.
- 1984 – PAASCU accreditation resurvey of the colleges of Commerce, Liberal Arts, and Education.
- 1986 – Expansion of the Demonstration Farm to 35 hectares, in meeting the growing needs of agriculture students and extension programs of the college.
- 1987 – NDMC became sister schools with Notre Dame College, Shepparton, Victoria, Australia. Two groups led by Brother Columbanus Pratt, FMS came to visit the school.
- 1988 – Hosting of the NDEA Silver Jubilee Athletic Competitions. Start of construction on the Science Complex with a grant from the USAID American Schools and Hospitals Abroad (ASHA), sponsored by the FMS Esopus Province.
- 1989 – Teston Hall part of the Science Complex, was opened for the Physics, Computer, and Mathematics laboratories, and Saint Marcellin Champagnat Hall.
- 1990 – Purchase of a 3.5-hectare site for the elementary and high school departments in Barrio 2, with a three-storey building completed nine months later.
- 1991 – Completion of the one-storey, two-classroom building at the Demonstration Farm.
- 1992 – NDMC was granted university status, becoming Notre Dame of Marbel University (NDMU). Brother Eugene Pius Tajo, FMS became the first University President. The Science Complex was blessed and formally turned over to NDMU by Compex Construction.
- 1993 – NDMU led by first female and layperson, University President Dr. Leonor P. Pagunsan.
- 1994 – Construction began on the new elementary school building (later the Integrated Basic Education Department or NDMU-IBED) in Barrio 2.
- 1996 – Blessing and turnover of the new elementary school building in Barrio 2 to NDMU.
- 1999 – Brother Crispin Betita, FMS becomes University President after Dr. Pagunsan finished her six-year term.
- 2001 – The Commission on Higher Education (CHED) grants Autonomous Status to NDMU, one of four schools in Mindanao and 30 nationwide.
- 2006 – Brother Wilfredo E. Lubrico, FMS became the University President after heading Notre Dame of Dadiangas University (NDDU) in General Santos.
- 2018-2019 – NDMU applied to the Legal Education Board (LEB) and the Supreme Court for permission to offer a Bachelor of Laws course. The LEB allowed NDMU to open a law school in Koronadal, the first in the city and in South Cotabato.
- 2019 – Blessing and opening of the three-storey Montagne Hall for the Senior High School Department, which was named during the Church in the Philippines’ celebration of the Year of the Youth. Groundbreaking also happened for the New Marista Building (containing the SHS Cafeteria and Auditorium), the NDMU-IBED Multi-Purpose Gymnasium, and the Business and Registrar Extension for Senior High School. Present were South Cotabato Governor Reynaldo Tamayo, Jr, Koronadal Mayor Eliordo Ogena, and Region XII DepEd Director Allan Farnazo. The university’s Diamond Jubilee celebrations began with the Marist Hope Center for Justice and Good Governance, and announcement of the NDMU-IBED Chapel.
- 2021 – Lubrico dies on 25 January, the first time a University President has died in office; his necrological service and funeral are held at the University Gymnasium. Brother Dominador Santiago, FMS was Acting President until 31 May. On 1 June, Brother Paterno Corpus, FMS officially became Universal President, and Brother Noel T. Fernández, FMS became NDMU-IBED Director. Both had previously served in NDDU.

== Marist Brothers ==
A statue of Saint Marcellin Champagnat, the Patron of the University and founder of the Marist brothers near the Administration Building

The Marist Brothers of the Schools (FMS), commonly known as the Marist Brothers, is a congregation of men devoted to Christian education throughout the world, running Catholic schools or otherwise providing for the training and guidance of youth.

The Marists were founded in France in 1817 by Saint Marcellin Champagnat, who saw the values of a Catholic education wherein God, the Blessed Virgin Mary, along with Catholic doctrine and morality are part of a school’s daily program.

The Marist Brothers are active in France, Australia, Spain, Brazil, Mexico, Canada, the United States, Egypt, Nigeria, Zimbabwe, Argentina, New Zealand, Belgium, and Italy. In the Asia-Pacific, they maintain a presence in the Philippines, Malaysia, Pakistan, Sri Lanka, South Korea, Japan, Taiwan, Guam, and Hong Kong.

Key facilities for training future Marist Brothers in the Philippines are the Aspirancy in Lagao, General Santos; the Novitiate in Tamontaka, Cotabato City; and the Scholasticate in Marikina, Metro Manila.

Presently, the Marist Brothers in the Philippines administer three tertiary educational institutions: NDMU, Notre Dame of Dadiangas University, and Notre Dame of Kidapawan College. They also operate seven high schools and four elementary schools in Koronadal, Cotabato City, General Santos, Marikina, Kidapawan, and Jolo.

== Facilities ==
- Administrative Building
- Alumni Center
- Athletics and Fitness Center
- Audio-visual rooms
- Bro. Renato Cruz Hall
- Cafe Marista
- CBA Recreation Area
- Clinic
- Creegan Hall
- Dumont Hall
- Doherty Building (Crime Laboratory)
- HRM Laboratory Building
- Lorenzo Hall
- Marist Mansion
- Museum
- NASA Sun photometer and Weather station (Omer Hall Rooftop)
- NDMU Chapel
- NDMU Diagnostic Laboratory
- NDMU Library (the largest in the area)
- Nursing Laboratory
- Saint Marcellin Champagnat Hall
- Science and Technology Building (Omer and Teston Hall – Computer Laboratories)
- SMART SWEEP Laboratory
- SMC Hall and Gymnasium

== Colleges ==
- College of Arts and Sciences
- College of Business, Governance and Accountancy (formerly College of Business Administration)
- College of Education
- College of Engineering, Architecture and Computing (formerly College of Engineering and Technology)
- College of Health Sciences
- College of Law
- Graduate School
- Champagnat Community College (CCC) TechVoc Program, TESDA, and Community Extension Program

== Curriculum ==
=== Postgraduate ===
- Ph.D. in Educational Management
- Ph.D. in Science Education (Chemistry and Physics)

=== Graduate ===
- Master in Education (Biology, Chemistry, Educational Management, Filipino, Guidance and Counseling, Mathematics and Physics)
- Master of Arts in Library Science
- Master of Science in Biology, Chemistry, Crop Science, Mathematics, Physics (Thesis)
- Master of Science in Rural Extension and Development
- Master in Business Administration (Thesis and Non-Thesis)
- Master in Public Administration (Thesis and Non-Thesis)
- Master of Science in Information Technology (Non-Thesis)
- Master in Biology, Chemistry, English, Information Technology, Mathematics, Physics (Non-Thesis)

=== Law School ===
- Bachelor of Laws (LLB)

=== Five-Year Courses ===
- BS Civil Engineering
- BS Computer Engineering
- BS Electronics and Communications Engineering
- BS Electrical Engineering

=== Four-Year Courses ===
- AB Philosophy
- AB Political Science
- AB Psychology
- BS Accountancy
- BS Management Accounting
- BS Biology
- BS Business Administration (Majors in: Financial Management, Marketing Management, Human Resource Development Management)
- BS Chemistry
- BS Computer Science
- BS Criminology
- BS Elementary Education (Area of Concentration: General, Pre-School)
- BS Secondary Education (Area of Concentration: Biological Sciences, English, Filipino, Mathematics, MAPEH, Physical Sciences)
- BS Environmental Science
- BS Hotel and Restaurant Management
- BS Information Technology
- BS Medical Technology
- BS Nursing
- BS Social Work

=== Three-Year Courses ===
- Associate in Industrial Technology

=== Two-Year Courses ===
- Diploma in Computer Technology
- Associate in Business Administration
- Associate in Computer Technology
- Associate in Hotel and Restaurant Management

=== Special Programs ===
- Expanded Tertiary Education Equivalency & Accreditation Program (ETEEAP)
- Champagnat E – Skills & Technical Program (CeSTEP)

== IBED Campus ==
The Notre Dame of Marbel University-Integrated Basic Education Department (IBED) Campus is in Purok Masikap, Barangay Santo Niño, Koronadal, and offers the following:

- Kindergarten
- Elementary and Junior High School Department
- Senior High School Department

Infrastructure

- Elementary Building with Quadrangle
- Elementary Canteen
- Elementary and Junior High School (JHS) Volleyball Grounds
- JHS Building with Quadrangle
- JHS Student Center
- Kindergarten Building
- Montagne Hall (Senior High School Building)
- NDMU-IBED Gymnasium
- SHS Cafeteria and Engr. Orlando Batallones Events Hall
- Science Building (JHS and SHS)
- Soccer Field with Review Stand
- TLE Hall

Gates

- Elementary Gate (Depita Street)
- High School Gate (IBED Private Road)
- Gymnasium Gate (Balmores Street)

Under Construction

- NDMU IBED 75th Year Diamond Jubillee Chapel
- NDMU IBED Aquatic Center (indoor, Olympic-size swimming pool)

Demolished

- JHS Canteen (for the entrance of the NDMU-IBED Gym)

Proposed

- NDMU-IBED Business Complex (fronting the national highway)

== NDMU Farm ==
NDMU has its Demonstration Farm in Barangay Paraiso, Koronadal, and includes the following:

- Recollection House
- Two, one-storey buildings
- 12 hectares of land with crops of mango, rice, and corn for agriculture courses

== NDMU Complex ==
The NDMU Complex is along Alunan Avenue, across the South Cotabato Sports Complex (SMRAA) and DepEd-South Cotabato Division. It comprises the following:

- NDMU Main Complex: a two-storey building housing Internet cafés, pharmacies, clinics, and offices
- NDMU Clinical and Diagnostic Laboratory: officially opened December 2005, it is a clinical and diagnostic lab for health sciences students
- NDMU E-biz Building: houses a 24-hour RCBC E-biz Bank
- Marian Building: a two-storey building with pharmacies, offices, and stores
- NDMU Marist Center for Hope and Good Governance: a nonprofit, non-stock organisation for the protection of the environment and Indigenous Peoples in South Cotabato

== Presidents ==
2021 – Present Bro. Paterno C. Corpus, FMS
2021 – Bro. Dominador A. Santiago, FMS (*acting)
2006 – 2021 Bro. Wilfredo E. Lubrico, FMS
1999 – 2006 Bro. Crispín P. Betita, FMS
1993 – 1999 Dr. Leonor P. Pagunsan
1989 – 1993 Bro. Eugene Pius Tajo, FMS
1985 – 1989 Bro. Manuel P. Uluan, FMS
1980 – 1985 Bro. Wenceslao Calimpon, FMS
1976 – 1980 Bro. Renato Cruz, FMS
1973 – 1976 Bro. Agustín Cabrera, FMS
1970 – 1973 Bro. Paul Johannes Meuten, FMS
1966 – 1970 Bro. Damian Teston, FMS
1961 – 1966 Bro. Henry Joseph Ruiz, FMS
1958 – 1961 Bro. Herbert Daniel Dumont, FMS
1957 – 1958 Bro. Joseph Damian Teston, FMS
1952 – 1957 Bro. Herbert Daniel Dumont, FMS

== Other Notre Dame schools in the Philippines ==
- Notre Dame University - Cotabato City (NDU)
- Notre Dame of Dadiangas University (NDDU)
- Notre Dame of Jolo College (NDJC)
- Notre Dame of Kidapawan College (NDKC)
- Notre Dame of Midsayap College (NDMC)
- Notre Dame of Tacurong College (NDTC)
- Notre Dame of Greater Manila
