= Notre Dame of Tacurong College =

Roman Catholic college in Sultan Kudarat, Philippines

- Kolehiyo ng Notre Dame ng Tacurong (Filipino)
- Motto: EXCEL at all times!
- Type: Private College
- Established: 1950; 76 years ago
- Founders: Fr. Joseph Quinn, OMI
- Religious affiliation: Roman Catholic (Archdiocese of Cotabato)
- Academic affiliations: NDEA; PAASCU; PRISAA
- President: Rev. Fr. Arnold L. Fuentes, DCC
- Principal: Elmer G. Muyco, MA (Junior & Senior High School Department); Rona M. Tahum (Grade School Department)
- Dean: Melody A. Zaragoza, Ed.D; Dr. June Ann O. Oberez; Elmer C. Organia, RN, Ph.D
- Location: National Highway, Tacurong City, Sultan Kudarat, Philippines; 6°41′15″N 124°40′22″E
- Alma Mater Song: "Notre Dame Hymn"
- Core Values: "EXCEL"; Excellence, Christ(Xt)-centeredness, Commitment, Empowerment, Leadership
- Colors: White and Green
- Mascot: NDTC Stallion
- Website: www.ndtc.edu.ph
- Location in Mindanao Location in the Philippines

Notre Dame of Tacurong College is a private, Catholic basic and higher education institution run by the Archdiocese of Cotabato in the City of Tacurong, Sultan Kudarat, Philippines. It was established by the Oblates in 1950. It offers Elementary, Junior High School, Senior High School, and College to the neighboring municipalities, cities, and provinces. It has been a member of the Notre Dame Educational Association, a group of schools named Notre Dame in the Philippines under the patronage of the Blessed Virgin Mary.

== Timeline ==
Notre Dame of Tacurong College has been operating for more than 70 years.

- 1950 - Notre Dame of Tacurong was opened by Fr. Joseph Quinn, OMI an Oblate Priest, upon instruction from Bishop Gerard Mongeau, OMI, to establish a Notre Dame school in Tacurong. The first 250 high school boys ang girls were welcomed on opening day.
- 1957 - The girls were entrusted to the Dominican Sisters of St. Catherine of Siena (O.P.).
- 1963 - The college and the Elementary Departments were opened. College program offered were BSEED, BSE, and Liberal Arts.
- 1964 - Commerce program was opened and the college building was inaugurated.
- 1965 - The first commencement exercise was held with 35 ETC graduates.
- 1974 - OMIs left the corridors of NDTC.
- 1975-1980 - Marist Brothers took over the administration of NDTC.
- 1981 - Another wave of administrators took over NDTC. They are the Dominican Sisters of St. Catherine of Siena.
- 1982 - High school night classes were opened to cater the underprivileged out-of-school youth and working students. The construction of the 3-storey college building was started.
- 1987 - Construction of the 3-storey college building was finished.
- 1988-2000 - Massive development was done in NDTC. The construction of the gymnasium, the Home Economics building, the nursing laboratory, the three-storey Sullivan building, the NDTC Centrum, the elementary and high school canteens, the computer laboratories for high school and elementary and the installation of Internet. The school offered two-year vocational courses in computer programming, computer secretarial, computer systems technician, hotel and restaurant management, nursing aide, travel and tourism, and four-year courses in criminology, computer science and social work.
- 2002 - The Archdiocese of Cotabato took over the administration and the ownership of the school. Rev. Fr. Colin M. Bagaforo, a priest of the Archdiocese of Cotabato was installed as the 8th President of NDTC. In his inaugural address, Fr. Bagaforo stressed four thrusts of his incoming administration: Quality Education through PAASCU Accreditation, Information Technology, Social Responsibility and Pastoral Collaboration.
- 2003 - A new Vision-Mission statement came up. Renovation and repainting of the old buildings were done.
- 2004 - The Liberal Arts, Commerce and Education programs were granted Level II accreditation by PAASCU. In the same year, the application for the Nursing Program was submitted to CHED. Simultaneous with the application effort, the nursing laboratories and library requirements were procured. The BS in Nursing finally commenced which paved the way for the construction of the 2-storey nursing building and procurement of a school bus as a transport vehicle for nursing student's RLE activities. Information Technology was upgraded which paved the way for the opening the Bachelor of Science in Computer Engineering. The research and community extension services were strengthened, the alumni association was revitalized, and the Office of External Affairs was established.
- 2005 - Monday flag ceremonies started where all the plans and programs, calendar of activities and achievements for the week are announced and recognized. The Courier, the administration's mouthpiece began its semestral publication and February 2 was declared as NDTC Foundation Day. A five-month Electronic and Electricity course was launched serving 42 out of school youth.
- 2006 - Another six-month skills training in Dressmaking and Tailoring was offered to 35 out of school youth, young mothers and heads of the family. Fr. Bagaforo was appointed as the Auxiliary Bishop of Cotabato.
- 2007 - Installed Rev. Mons. Antonio P. Pueyo, Ed.D. as the 2nd Diocesan Clergy of Cotabato to be installed as President of Notre Dame of Tacurong College. His trust focuses on Instruction, Research, and Community Extension. The Bachelor of Science in Hotel and Restaurant Management and Bachelor of Science in Accounting Technology were opened. The high school department was granted level II accreditation status by Philippine Association of Schools, Colleges and Universities (PAASCU) from 2007 to 2010 and level II re-accreditation status for Liberal Arts and BS in commerce from 2007 to 2012.
- 2010-2011 - The High School Department underwent PAASCU Re-accreditation Visit that resulted into a 5-year re-accreditation Level II status.
- 2012 - The Grade School Department had a PAASCU Preliminary Survey visit. Installation of Rev. Fr. Jessie P. Pasquin as the 3rd Diocesan Clergy of Cotabato installed as President of NDTC.
- 2016 - Opens its gate to the Senior High School students.
- 2017 - High School Department attains its PAASCU re-accreditation status.
- 2018 - First batch of Senior High School Graduated.
- 2019 - Grade School Department attains its PAASCU re-accreditation status. In the same manner, the High School Department gains its PAASCU Accreditation Level III.
- 2020 - Due to the Pandemic, Notre Dame of Tacurong College shifted its education delivery to online.
- 2025 - NDTC celebrates its 75th founding anniversary, with year-long activities. Its kick-off celebration was on July 24, 2025, and concluded on February 3-6, 2026.
- 2026 - The Board of Trustees, through its Corporate Secretary, announced the appointment of Rev. Fr. Arnold L. Fuentes, DCC as its 11th President and fourth from the Diocesan Clergy of Cotabato.

== Departments ==
- Grade School Department - PAASCU Accredited Level I
- Junior High School Department - PAASCU Accredited Level III
- Senior High School Department
- College Department

   -College of Arts, Sciences and Education
   -College of Business and Technical-Vocational Courses
   -College of Nursing

== Courses Offered ==
- Bachelor of Arts - PAASCU Accredited Level II
- Bachelor of Elementary Education - PAASCU Accredited Level I
- Bachelor of Secondary Education - PAASCU Accredited Level I
- Bachelor of Science in Accountancy
- Bachelor of Science in Business Administration - PAASCU Accredited Level II
- Bachelor of Science in Computer Engineering - PAASCU Accredited Level I
- Bachelor of Science in Computer Science - PAASCU Accredited Level I
- Bachelor of Science in Criminology - PAASCU Accredited Level I
- Bachelor of Science in Hotel and Restaurant Management
- Bachelor of Science in Nursing - PAASCU Accredited Level I
- Bachelor of Science in Social Work
