= Notre Dame Educational Association =

- Notre Dame Educational Association
- Type: Educational Association
- Established: 1963
- Religious affiliation: Roman Catholic
- President: Sister Maria Fe Gerodias, RVM
- Location: Tacurong City, Philippines
- Campus: Multiple campuses
- Members: Marist (FMS), Oblates of Mary Immaculate (OMI), Augustinian Recollect Sisters (AR), Dominican Sisters of St. Catherine of Siena (OP), Oblates of Notre Dame (OND), Religious of the Virgin Mary (RVM), Sisters of Paul of Chartres (SPC), Sisters of the Presentation of Mary (PM), Archdiocese of Cotabato, Diocese of Kidapawan, Diocese of Marbel, Vicariate of Jolo
- Colors: Green, White, Black & Gold
- Website: https://ndeaceapxii.org/home

Notre Dame Educational Association, Inc. (NDEA) is a network of Notre Dame Schools in the Philippines, under the patronage of the Blessed Virgin Mary, owned and administered by:

Religious Congregations
Juridical Jurisdictions

Oblates of Mary Immaculate (OMI)
Marist Brothers (FMS)
Augustinian Recollect Sisters (AR)
Dominican Sisters of St. Catherine of Siena (OP)
Oblates of Notre Dame (OND)
Religious of the Virgin Mary (RVM)
Sisters of Paul of Chartres (SPC)
Sisters of the Presentation of Mary (PM)

Archdiocese of Cotabato
Diocese of Kidapawan
Diocese of Marbel
Vicariate of Jolo
Archdiocese of Jaro
Diocese of Bacolod
Diocese of Imus
Diocese of Kalookan
Diocese of Kidapawan
Diocese of Malolos
Diocese of Marbel
Diocese of San Fernando de La Union
Metropolitan Archdiocese of Manila

== History ==
It had its beginnings in 1941 when the Oblates Fathers, who had been asked by the Church to take over the ministry for the people of the then empire province of Cotabato, as well as the Sulu Archipelago, founded a school in Midsayap, which they named Notre Dame on the suggestion of Fr. Joseph Boyd, OMI. Hence, in July 1941, Notre Dame Academy, now known as Notre Dame of Midsayap College, in Midsayap opened its doors. It was the first Notre Dame school, which grew to over 190 and form the Notre Dame Educational Association.

After the war, communities of migrants from elsewhere in the Philippines, mainly the Ilocos region and the Visayan islands, settled in various parts of the empire province. The national government then was only able to provide elementary education opportunities for such communities, but the migrants saw the need for more schooling for their young ones beyond the elementary level. The Oblate Fathers and the other religious congregations, who came to the empire province to minister mainly to the spiritual needs of the migrants who were mostly Catholic, responded by opening secondary schools and, where feasible, colleges in these communities. This was also done in the Sulu Archipelago as the native populace began to realize the value of formal education. In all instances, the name given to the schools so founded was also Notre Dame. Further emphasizing this early spirit of oneness was the use of a common school uniform for the students and the same school hymn.

Thus begun the commitment to serve the educational needs of the region and its younger educational needs of the region and its younger generations under the banner and inspiration of Notre Dame. In the 1950s they worked together to hold annual athletic competitions, the Notre Dame Meets, which was at that time one of the biggest event in the region.

In 1962 the Superintendent of Catholic schools in the diocese (which then included both the empire province of Cotabato and the Sulu archipelago) directed the heads of the various Notre Dame schools to have a series of meetings to discuss common needs and problems and ways in which they can cooperatively meet these.

The most popular Notre Dame schools are Notre Dame of Dadiangas University, Notre Dame of Marbel University, Notre Dame University and Notre Dame of Greater Manila.
