= List of Catholic universities and colleges in the Philippines =

The following is a list of Roman Catholic schools, colleges and universities in the Philippines. More than 1,500 Catholic schools throughout the country are members of the Catholic Educational Association of the Philippines (CEAP), the country's national association of Catholic schools founded in 1941. An additional 160 colleges and universities in the country are affiliated with the Catholic Church in the Philippines. Most of the Roman Catholic religious congregations in the Philippines own and operate schools. These include:

== Angelic Sisters of Saint Paul (Angelic Sisters) – Angeliche di San Paolo (ASP) ==
- Mother of Divine Providence School, Marikina, Metro Manila

== Augustinian Missionaries of the Philippines (AMP) ==
- Divina Pastora College, Gapan, Nueva Ecija

== Congregation of the Augustinian Recollect Sisters [AR] ==
- Blessed Trinity College, Talibon, Bohol
- Colegio de la Medalla Milagrosa, Jagna, Bohol
- Colegio de Santa Rosa – Cavite, Conchu, Trece Martires City, Cavite
- Colegio de Santa Rosa - Makati, Estrella St. Makati
- Colegio de Santa Rosa – Manila, Sto. Tomas, Intramuros, Manila
- Colegio de Sta. Rita, San Carlos City, Negros Occidental
- Colegio de Sta. Teresita, Laoang, Northern Samar
- Consolatrix College, Toledo City, Cebu
- Immaculate Conception College, Balayan, Batangas
- Notre Dame of Banga, South Cotabato
- Notre Dame of Lamba, Banga, South Cotabato
- Saint Rita College - Manila
- San Francisco Javier College, Narra, Palawan
- St. Joseph College, San Roque, Cavite City

== Congregation of the Daughters of St. Dominic (OP) ==
- Daughters of St. Dominic School, Antipolo
- Daughters of St. Dominic School, Limay, Bataan
- Daughters of St. Dominic School, Quezon City
- Dominican College of Tarlac, Capas, Tarlac

== Congregation of the Dominican Sisters of St. Catherine of Siena (OP) ==
- Holy Rosary School of Pardo, Cebu
- Holy Trinity University, Puerto Princessa Palawa
- Notre Dame Hospital & School of Midwifery
- Notre Dame of Tulunan, Cotabato
- Notre Dame-Siena College of General Santos City, South Cotabato
- Notre Dame-Siena College of Polomolok, South Cotabato
- Notre Dame-Siena College of Tacurong, Sultan Kudarat
- Notre Dame-Sienna School of Koronadal, South Cotabato
- Santa Catalina College Binan, Laguna
- Santa Catalina College Manila
- Siena College of Hermosa, Bataan
- Siena College of Quezon City
- Siena College of San Jose, City of San Jose del Monte, Bulacan
- Siena College of Taytay, Rizal
- Siena College of Tigaon, Camarines Sur

== Congregation of the Missionary Benedictine Sisters of Tutzing (Missionary Benedictine Sisters) (OSB) ==
- Holy Family Academy, Angeles City, Pampanga
- St. Agnes' Academy Legazpi City, Albay
- St. Peter's College of Ormoc, Leyte
- St. Scholastica's Academy Bacolod, Negros Occidental
- St. Scholastica's Academy Marikina, Metro Manila
- St. Scholastica's Academy San Fernando, Pampanga
- St. Scholastica’s Academy Tabunok – Talisay City, Cebu
- St. Scholastica's College Manila, Metro Manila
- St. Scholastica’s College Tacloban, Leyte
- St. Scholastica’s College Westgrove – Silang, Cavite

== Congregation of the Hijas de Jesus (FI) ==
- Colegio de Las Hijas de Jesus, Ledesma St., Iloilo City

== Congregation of the Immaculate Heart of Mary (CICM Missionaries) – Congregatio Immaculati Cordis Mariae (CICM) ==
- College of Immaculate Concepcion, Cabanatuan City, Nueva Ecija
- Saint Louis College Cebu, Mandaue City, Cebu
- Saint Louis College of San Fernando, La Union
- Saint Louis University, Baguio City, Benguet
- Saint Mary's University, Bayombong, Nueva Vizcaya
- University of Saint Louis Tuguegarao, Tuguegarao City, Cagayan Valley

== Congregation of the Religious Missionaries of St. Dominic (Mission Sisters) – Congregación de Religiosas Misioneras de Sto. Domingo (OP) ==
- Dominican Academy, Unisan, Quezon Province
- Dominican College, Santa Rosa City Laguna
- Dominican School, Camalig, Albay
- Dominican School, Dagupan
- Dominican School, Manila
- Dominican School, Santa Rita, Pampanga

== Congregation of the Rogationists of the Heart of Jesus (Rogationists) -Congregatio Rogationistarum a Corde Iesu (RCJ) - The School System is collectively known as the Association of Rogationist Catholic Educational Communities in the Philippines (ARCEC-P) ==
- Rogationist Academy, Toril, Davao
- Rogationist College-Parañaque, Parañaque City
- Rogationist College, Silang, Cavite
- Pastoral Institute for Vocation Ministry, Parañaque City
- Rogationist Seminary College of Philosophy, Parañaque City
- Rogationist Seminary College-Cebu, Punta Princesa, Cebu
- St. Hannibal Multi-Level School Foundation, Inc., Parañaque City
- St. Hannibal Educational Center, Pangasinan

== Congregation of Missionaries, Sons of the Immaculate Heart of the Blessed Virgin Mary (Claretians) – Congregatio Missionariorum Filiorum Immaculati Cordis Beatae Mariae Virginis (C.M.F.) ==
- Claret College of Isabela City
- Claret School of Lamitan City
- Claret School of Maluso
- Claret School of Quezon City
- Claret School of Tumahubong
- Claret School of Zamboanga City

== Congregation of the Mission (Vincentians) – Congregatio Missionis (CM) ==
- Adamson University, Manila
- De Paul College, Jaro Iloilo City

== Company of the Daughters of Charity of Saint Vincent de Paul – Societas Filiarum Caritatis a S. Vincentio de Paulo (DC) ==
- Colegio de la Inmaculada Concepcion - Cebu City, Cebu
- Concordia College - Paco, Manila
- Colegio de la Inmaculada Concepcion - Tipolo, Mandaue City
- Colegio del Sagrado Corazon de Jesus - Iloilo City, Iloilo
- Colegio de San Jose - Iloilo City, Iloilo
- Immaculate Heart of Mary College - Quezon City, Metro Manila
- Sacred Heart College - Lucena City, Quezon
- Saint Louise de Marillac School of Bulan, Sorsogon
- Saint Louise de Marrilac College of Bogo, Cebu
- Saint Louise de Marrilac College of Sorsogon City
- Santa Isabel College Manila - Ermita, Manila
- Universidad de Santa Isabel - Naga City, Camarines Sur

== Daughters of Mary Help of Christians – Congregatio Filiarum Mariae Auxiliatricis (FMA) ==
- Mary Help of Christians College - Canlubang, Laguna
- Mary Help of Christians School - Brgy. Mabiga, Mabalacat, Pampanga
- Mary Help of Christians School - Brgy. Macarascas, Puerto Princesa, Palawan
- Mary Help of Christians School - Brgy. Parang, Calapan, Oriental Mindoro
- Mary Help of Christians School - Brgy. Tungha-an, Minglanilla, Cebu

== Daughters of Virgin Mary Immaculate (DVMI) ==
- Mater Ecclesiae School, Victoria, Laguna
- Mater Ecclesiae School, Villa Olympia Subd., San Pedro, Laguna
- Virgin Mary Immaculate School Alabang, Muntinlupa, Metro Manila

== Augustinian Sisters of Our Lady of Consolation (OSA) ==
- La Consolacion College – Baao, Camarines Sur
- La Consolacion College - Bacolod, Negros Occidental
- La Consolacion College – Bais City, Negros Oriental
- La Consolacion College – Biñan, Laguna
- La Consolacion College – Caloocan, Metro Manila
- La Consolacion College - Daet, Camarines Norte
- La Consolacion College - Iriga, Camarines Sur
- La Consolacion College – Isabela, Negros Occidental
- La Consolacion College – La Carlota City, Negros Occidental
- La Consolacion College – Liloan, Cebu
- La Consolacion College – Manila, Metro Manila
- La Consolacion College – Murcia, Negros Occidental
- La Consolacion College – Novaliches, Metro Manila
- La Consolacion College – Pasig, Metro Manila
- La Consolacion College – Tanauan, Batangas
- La Consolacion College – Trento, Agusan del Sur
- La Consolacion College – Valenzuela, Metro Manila
- La Consolacion School – Balagtas, Bulacan
- La Consolacion School – Gardenville Tangub, Bacolod City
- La Consolacion University Philippines, Malolos, Bulacan
- Santo Tomas College – Danao City, Cebu

== Dominican Sisters of the Trinity (OP) ==
- Assumption Academy of Monkayo, Davao de Oro
- Fr. Urios Academy, Hinatuan, Surigao del Sur
- Holy Cross of Hagonoy, Davao del Sur
- Holy Cross of Magsaysay, Davao del Sur
- San Antonio School, Aras-asan, Cagwait, Surigao del Sur
- San Pedro College, Davao City
- St. James Academy Malabon, Metro Manila
- St. Vincent Academy of Maragusan, Davao de Oro

== Franciscan Sisters of the Immaculate Conception of the Holy Mother of God -Sororum Franciscalium ab Immaculata Conceptione a Beata Matre Dei (SFIC) ==
- Saint Joseph’s School of Mactan, Cebu

== Franciscan Apostolic Sisters (FAS) ==
- La Milagrosa Academy, Calbayog City, Samar
- Lyceum of Lallo, Cagayan
- Saint Michael’s High School, Gandara, Samar
- St. Joseph College, Canlaon City, Negros Oriental
- St. Joseph College, San Jose, Baggao, Cagayan

== Franciscan Missionaries of Mary (FMM) ==
- Stella Maris College Oroquieta City
- Stella Maris College Quezon City
- Stella Maris School Cebu City
- St. Josephs Academy in Sariaya, Quezon

== Missionary Sisters of the Immaculate Conception (MIC) ==
- Immaculate Heart of Mary Academy, Mati City, Davao Oriental, Minglanilla

== Missionary Sisters of the Immaculate Heart of Mary – Immaculati Cordis Mariae (ICM) ==
- Christ the King College, San Fernando, La Union
- Saint Theresa's College of Cebu
- Saint Theresa's College of Quezon City
- St. Augustine School, Tagudin, Ilocos Sur

== Missionary Sisters Servants of the Holy Spirit – Congregatio Missionalis Servarum Spiritus Sancti (SSpS) ==
- College of the Holy Spirit of Tarlac
- Holy Spirit Academy of Irosin
- Holy Spirit Academy of Malolos
- Holy Spirit School of Tagbilaran
- Holy Trinity Academy in Loay, Bohol
- School of the Holy Spirit of BF Homes Quezon City
- School of the Holy Spirit of Cubao Quezon City

== Missionary Oblates of Mary Immaculate (Oblates) – Congregatio Missionariorum Oblatorum Maria Immaculatae (OMI) ==
- Notre Dame Learning Center, Cotabato City
- Notre Dame of Bago City Negros Occidental
- Notre Dame of Dulawan, Maguindanao
- Notre Dame of Greater Manila (NDGM)
- Notre Dame of Jolo College (NDJC), Sulu
- Notre Dame of Kulaman (NDK) Sultan Kudarat
- Notre Dame of Makilala, North Cotabato
- Notre Dame of Midsayap College (NDMC), North Cotabato
- Notre Dame of Pikit, Cotabato
- Notre Dame of Talisay, Negros Occidental Mindanao
- Notre Dame University (NDU), Cotabato City

== Missionaries of the Assumption (MA) ==
- Assumption College of Davao

== Missionaries of Our Lady of La Salette – Missionarii Dominæ Nostræ a La Salette (M.S.) ==
- La Salette of Aurora, Isabela (1952)
- La Salette of Cabatuan, Isabela (1967)
- La Salette of Cordon, Isabela
- La Salette of Jones, Isabela (1961)
- La Salette of Quezon, Isabela (1960)
- La Salette of Ramon, Isabela (1967)
- La Salette of Roxas, Isabela (1957)
- La Salette of San Mateo, Isabela (1949)
- University of La Salette, Santiago City, Isabela

== Institute of the Brothers of the Christian Schools (LaSallian Brothers) – Fratres Scholarum Christianarum (FSC) ==
Also see

- De La Salle Andres Soriano Memorial College (DLSASMC), Lutopan, Toledo City, Cebu
- De La Salle Araneta University, Malabon, Metro Manila
- De La Salle Canlubang, Laguna
- De La Salle–College of Saint Benilde – Taft & Antipolo
- De La Salle John Bosco College
- De La Salle Lipa, Lipa, Batangas
- De La Salle Medical and Health Sciences Institute
- De La Salle Santiago Zobel, Ayala Alabang, Muntinlupa
- De La Salle Supervised Schools
- De La Salle University – Dasmariñas, Cavite
- De La Salle University, Manila
- Jaime Hilario Integrated School – La Salle
- La Salle Academy
- La Salle College Antipolo
- La Salle Green Hills
- La Salle University, Ozamiz
- St. Benilde School, Bacolod
- University of St. La Salle, Bacolod

== Institute of the Brothers of the Holy Family – Institutum Fratrum a Sancta Familia (FSF) ==
- Gabriel Taborin Technical School Foundation, Davao City

== Institute of the Brothers of the Sacred Heart (Brothers) – Fratres a Sacratissimo Corde Iesu (SC) ==
- Cor Jesu College, Digos, Davao del Sur

== Marist Brothers of the Schools (Marist Brothers) – Fratres Maristae a Scholis (FMS) ==
- Marist School (Marikina)
- Notre Dame Institute
- Notre Dame of Cotabato (NDC) Cotobato City, Maguindanao
- Notre Dame of Dadiangas University (NDDU), General Santos City, South Cotabato
- Notre Dame of Kidapawan College (NDKC) Kidapawan City, Cotabato
- Notre Dame of Marbel University (NDMU), Koronadal·City, South Cotabato
- Notre Dame of Jolo High School-Kasulutan (NDJHSK), Jolo, Sulu

== Sisters of the Presentation of Mary (PM) ==
- Holy Cross College of Calinan
- Holy Cross of Malalag
- Holy Cross of Malita
- Holy Cross of Mintal, Davao City
- Holy Cross of Sta. Maria
- Notre Dame of Mlang, North Cotabato
- Presentation of Mary School in Clarin, Bohol
- St. Michael's School of Padada, Davao del Sur
- Saint Peter´s College of Toril

== Sisters of St. Paul of Chartres (SPC) ==
- Mt. Carmel School of Polillo, Quezon
- Notre Dame of Surala, South Cotabato
- Our Lady of Peace School, Antipolo
- Santo Nino High School Gitagum, Misamis Oriental
- St. Anthony Parish School of Manticao, Misamis Oriental
- St. Augustine's School Iba, Zambales
- St. Gabriel Academy Caloocan
- St. Isidore Learning Center Burgos, Pangasinan
- St. Joseph Institute, Candon City
- St. Michael College of Cantilan, Surigao del Sur
- St. Paul Academy of Goa, Camarines Sur
- St. Paul College, Island Park Dasmarinas, Cavite
- St. Paul College of Balayan, Batangas
- St. Paul College of Bocaue, Bulacan
- St. Paul College of Ilocos Sur
- St. Paul College of Makati
- St. Paul College of Parañaque
- St. Paul College of Pasig, Davao City
- St. Paul College of San Ildefonso, Bulacan
- St. Paul College of San Rafael, Bulacan
- St.Paul College Pasig Extension
  Fr. Louis Chauvet Foundation School
  Brgy. Palatiw, Pasig
- St. Paul College of Pasig
- St. Paul School, Barotac Nuevo, Iloilo
- St. Paul School of Aparri, Cagayan
- St. Paul School of Buug, Zamboanga Sibugay
- St. Paul School of Medellin, Cebu
- St. Paul School of Sta.Maria, Bulacan
- St. Paul University Dumaguete
- St. Paul University Iloilo
- St. Paul University Manila
- St. Paul University Philippines, Tuguegarao
- St. Paul University Quezon City
- St. Paul University San Miguel, Bulacan
- St. Paul University Surigao
- St. Vincent's Academy Candelaria, Zambales
- St. William's School San Marcelino, Zambales

== Sisters of Notre Dame (SND) ==
- Notre Dame Academy of Guimaras
- Notre Dame Academy of Iloilo

== Teresian Daughters of Mary (TDM) ==
- Assumption Academy of Peñaplata, Island Garden City of Samal
- Holy Cross College of Sasa, Davao City
- Maryknoll High School of Asuncion, Davao del Norte
- Maryknoll High School of New Corilla Davao del Norte
- Maryknoll School of Manay, Davao Oriental
- St. Mary’s Academy of Agoo, La Union
- St. Therese Learning Center in San Enrique, Iloilo

== Oblates of Notre Dame (OND) ==
- Notre Dame Academy San Fernando, Cebu
- Notre Dame Center of Cathechesis, Cotabato City
- Notre Dame of Abuyog (NDA), Leyte
- Notre Dame of Dulawan, Maguindanao:
- Notre Dame of Genio Edcor Inc., Alamada, Cotabato
- Notre Dame of Kabacan
- Notre Dame of Pikit

== Oblates of St. Joseph (Josephines of Asti) – Congregatio Oblatorum Sancti Iosephi (O.S.J.) ==
- Don Antonio de Zuzuarregui Sr. Memorial Academy, Antipolo
- Holy Family Academy, Padre Garcia, Batangas
- Joseph Marello Institute, San Juan, Batangas
- Our Lady of Mercy Academy, Taysan, Batangas
- Scuola San Giuseppe Marello, San Pablo City, Laguna
- St. James Academy, Ibaan, Batangas
- St. Joseph College of Rosario, Rosario, Batangas
- Sto. Rosario Academy, Rosario, Batangas

== Order of Augustinian Recollects – Ordo Augustinianorum Recollectorum (OAR) ==
- Colegio de San Pedro - Recoletos, Valencia, Negros Oriental
- Colegio de Santo Tomas – Recoletos, San Carlos City, Negros Occidental
- Colegio San Nicolas de Tolentino–Recoletos (formerly UNO-R High School Talisay Branch) (Talisay City, Negros Occidental)
- San Sebastian College – Recoletos de Cavite, Sta. Cruz, Cavite City
- San Sebastian College – Recoletos de Manila
- University of Negros Occidental – Recoletos, Bacolod
- University of San Jose – Recoletos, Cebu City

== Order of Saint Augustine (Augustinians) – Ordo Fratrum Sancti Augustini (OSA) ==
- Colegio San Agustin – Bacolod
- Colegio San Agustin – Biñan
- Colegio San Agustin – Bulacan
- Colegio San Agustin – Makati
- Colegio San Agustin - Mati
- Colegio del Santo Niño - Cebu
- San Jose Catholic School - Iloilo City
- Saint Thomas of Villanova Institute (Seminary) - Quezon City
- University of San Agustin - Iloilo City

== Order of Friars Minor (Franciscans) – Ordo Fratrum Minorum (O.F.M.) ==
- Our Lady of Montecelli Learning Center
- Our Lady of the Angels Seminary
- San Jose Parochial School
- St. Francis School

== Order of Friars Minor Capuchin (Capuchins) – Ordo Fratrum Minorum Capuccinorum (O.F.M. Cap.) ==
- Lourdes School of Mandaluyong
- Lourdes School of Quezon City
- Our Lady of Lourdes Seminary

== Order of Preachers (Dominicans) – Ordo Fratrum Praedicatorum (O.P.) ==
- Angelicum School Iloilo
- Aquinas School San Juan – Metro Manila
- Colegio de San Juan de Letran – Abucay, Bataan
- Colegio de San Juan de Letran – Calamba, Laguna
- Colegio de San Juan de Letran – Manaoag, Pangasinan
- Colegio de San Juan de Letran, Manila
- Dominican College, San Juan
- Dominican College, Sta Rosa Laguna
- Dominican School, Angeles City, Pampanga
- Dominican School, Apalit, Pampanga
- Dominican School, Sta. Rita, Pampanga
- Dominican School, Calabanga, Camarines Sur
- Dominican School, Cebu
- Dominican School, Pilar, Sorsogon
- University of Santo Tomas, Manila
- San Pedro College – Davao City
- University of Santo Tomas-General Santos City
- University of Santo Tomas - Legazpi, Albay
- University of Santo Tomas – Sta. Rosa Laguna
- UST Angelicum College, Quezon City

== Order of Saint Benedict (Benedictines) – Ordo Sancti Benedicti (O.S.B.) ==
- San Beda College Alabang
- San Beda University Manila

== Religious of the Assumption (RA) ==
- Assumption Antipolo
- Assumption College San Lorenzo
- Assumption Iloilo
- Assumption Passi
- Assumption Socio-educational Center, Barrio Obrero, Iloilo City
- Assumpta Technical High School, San Simon, Pampanga
- San Juan Nepomuceno School, Malibay, Pasay
- Sta. Rita Academy, Sibalom, Antique
- St. Martin School, Baguio
- St. Vincent Academy, Kauswagan, Lanao del Norte
- Xavier de Kibangay High School, Lantapan Bukidnon

== Religious of the Virgin Mary (RVM) ==
- Christ the King College, Gingoog City, Misamis Oriental
- Holy Cross Academy of Digos, Davao del Sur
- Holy Cross Academy of Oras, Oras Eastern Samar
- Infant King Academy, Jimalalud, Negros Oriental
- Lourdes College, Cagayan de Oro City
- Notre Dame of Makilala, North Cotabato
- Notre Dame – RVM College of Cotabato, Cotabato City
- Our Lady of Fatima Academy, Davao City
- Our Lady of Fatima Academy of Gen. MacArthur, Samar
- Pilar College, Zamboanga City
- St. Anthony's Academy of Tuburan, Cebu
- St. John the Baptist Academy, Lagonglong, Misamis Oriental
- St. Mary's Academy of Caloocan City
- St. Mary's Academy of Capiz, Roxas City, Capiz
- St. Mary's Academy of Caraga
- St. Mary’s Academy of Carmen, Cagayan de Oro City
- St. Mary's Academy of Dalaguete, Cebu
- St. Mary’s Academy of Dipolog City, Zamboanga del Norte
- St. Mary’s Academy of Guagua, Pampanga
- St. Mary's Academy of Guiuan, Eastern Samar
- St. Mary’s Academy of Hagonoy
- St. Mary's Academy of Iponan, Cagayan de Oro City
- St. Mary’s Academy of Jasaan, Misamis Oriental
- St. Mary’s Academy of Kidapawan, North Cotabato
- St. Mary's Academy of Lunao, Gingoog City
- St. Mary’s Academy of Manila, Yakal, Manila
- St. Mary's Academy of Midsayap, Cotabato
- St. Mary’s Academy of Nagcarlan, Laguna
- St. Mary's Academy of Oslob, Cebu
- St. Mary's Academy of Palo, Leyte
- St. Mary's Academy of Pasay
- St. Mary's Academy of San Nicolas, Cebu City
- St. Mary’s Academy of Sta. Ana, Manila
- St. Mary's Academy of Sta. Cruz, Davao del Sur
- St. Mary's Academy of Sta. Cruz, Davao del Sur
- St. Mary’s Academy of Sto. Niño, Bulacan
- St. Mary’s Academy of Talisayan, Misamis Oriental
- St. Mary's College of Baganga
- St. Mary's College of Baliuag, Bulacan
- St. Mary's College of Bansalan
- St. Mary's College of Boac
- St. Mary’s College of Borongan, Eastern Samar
- St. Mary's College of Catbalogan City
- St. Mary's College of Labason
- St. Mary's College of Meycauayan
- St. Mary's College of Quezon City, Quezon City
- St. Mary’s College of Tagum City, Davao del Norte
- St. Michael's College of Iligan City
- St. Rita's College, Balingasag, Misamis Oriental
- University of the Immaculate Conception, Davao City

== Salesians of the Society of Saint John Bosco (Salesians) – Societas Sancti Francisci Salesii (SDB) ==
- Don Bosco Academy, Pampanga Pampanga
- Caritas Don Bosco School, Sta. Rosa City
- Don Bosco College, Canlubang
- Don Bosco Formation Center, Talisay
- Don Bosco High School, Lagawe Ifugao
- Don Bosco Technical College–Cebu Cebu
- Don Bosco Technical College, Mandaluyong Metro Manila
- Don Bosco Technical Institute, Makati Metro Manila
- Don Bosco Technical Institute, Tarlac Tarlac
- Don Bosco Technical Institute, Victorias Negros Occidental
- St. Louis School of Don Bosco (Don Bosco Dumaguete), Dumaguete City

== Society of the Divine Word (Divine Word Missionaries) – (Societas Verbi Divini (SVD) ==
- Academy of St. Joseph - Provincial Road cor June 5th Street, Centro 1, Claveria, Cagayan
- Divine Word Academy of Dagupan – Rizal Ext., Dagupan, Pangasinan
- Divine Word College of Bangued – Bangued, Abra
- Divine Word College of Calapan – Calapan, Oriental Mindoro
- Divine Word College of Laoag – Gen. Segundo Ave., Laoag, Ilocos Norte
- Divine Word College of Legazpi – Rizal Street, Legazpi, Albay
- Divine Word College of San Jose – San Jose, Occidental Mindoro
- Divine Word College of Urdaneta – Urdaneta, Pangasinan
- Divine Word College of Vigan – Vigan, Ilocos Sur
- Divine Word Mission Seminary – 101 E. Rodriguez Sr. Blvd., Quezon City
- Divine Word Mission Seminary – Davao City, Davao del Sur
- Divine Word Seminary – Tagaytay, Cavite
- Divine Word University (DWU) – Tacloban, Leyte; closed in 1995, re-opened as Liceo del Verbo Divino in 2006
- Holy Name University – Tagbilaran, Bohol (formerly Holy Name College; also Divine Word College of Tagbilaran)
- Saint Jude Catholic School – San Miguel, Manila
- University of San Carlos – Cebu City

== Society of Jesus (Jesuits) – Societas Jesu (SJ) ==
- Ateneo de Cagayan – Xavier University, Cagayan de Oro City
- Ateneo de Davao University, Davao City
- Ateneo de Iloilo - Santa Maria Catholic School, Iloilo City, Iloilo
- Ateneo de Manila University, Quezon City, Metro Manila
- Ateneo de Naga University, Naga City, Camarines Sur
- Ateneo de Zamboanga University, Zamboanga City
- Marian College Ipil, Ipil, Zamboanga Sibugay
- Loyola College of Culion, Palawan
- Sacred Heart School - Ateneo de Cebu, Mandaue City, Cebu
- Xavier School, San Juan, Metro Manila / Nuvali, Laguna

== Prelature of the Holy Cross and Opus Dei – Praelatura Sanctae Crucis et Operis Dei ==
- University of Asia and the Pacific, Pasig

== Archdiocese – Diocese ==
=== Archdiocese of Cebu ===
- Saint Catherine’s College Carcar City, Cebu

=== Archdiocese of Cotabato ===
- Notre Dame of Arakan, Cotabato
- Notre Dame of Columbio, Sultan Kudarat
- Notre Dame of Dukay, Sultan Kudarat
- Notre Dame of Esperanza, Sultan Kudarat
- Notre Dame of Isulan, Sultan Kudarat
- Notre Dame of Kalamansig, Sultan Kudarat
- Notre Dame of Katiko, Sultan Kudarat
- Notre Dame of Kulaman, Sultan Kudarat
- Notre Dame of Lambayong, Sultan Kudarat
- Notre Dame of Libungan, Cotabato
- Notre Dame of Magpet, Cotabato
- Notre Dame of Masiag, Sultan Kudarat
- Notre Dame of Matalam, Cotabato
- Notre Dame Of Milbuk, Palimbang, Sultan Kudarat
- Notre Dame of Parang, Maguindanao
- Notre Dame of Pigcawayan, Cotabato
- Notre Dame of Salaman College, Lebak, Sultan Kudarat
- Notre Dame of Sarmiento, Parang, Maguindanao
- Notre Dame of Tacurong College, Sultan Kudarat
- Notre Dame of Upi, Maguindanao

=== Archdiocese of Davao ===
- Holy Cross of Davao College,
- San Lorenzo College of Davao, Davao City

=== Archdiocese of San Fernando, Pampanga ===
- University of the Assumption, San Fernando, Pampanga

=== Diocese of Antipolo ===
- Cainta Catholic College - Cainta, Rizal
- Sacred Heart Catholic School of Cainta - Cainta, Rizal
- Binangonan Catholic College - Binangonan, Rizal
- Our Lady of Peace School - Antipolo City
- St. John the Baptist Parochial School - Taytay, Rizal
- St. Jerome Academy - Morong, Rizal
- San Ildefonso College - Tanay, Rizal
- Angono Catholic College - Angono, Rizal
- St. Michael Parochial School - Jalajala, Rizal
- Saint Joseph Parish School - Baras, Rizal
- San Francisco Parish School - Cardona, Rizal
- Marikina Catholic School - Marikina City
- Nativity of Our Lady Parochial School - Marikina City
- Nuestra Señora De Aranzazu Parochial School - San Mateo, Rizal
- Sta. Cecilia Parochial School - San Mateo, Rizal

=== Diocese of Bangued ===
- Catholic High School of Pilar - Pilar, Abra
- Fr. Arnoldus High School - Sallapadan, Abra
- Heart of Mary High School - Dolores, Abra
- Holy Cross School - Lagangilang, Abra
- Holy Ghost School - Tayum, Abra
- Holy Spirit Academy - Bangued, Abra
- Little Flower High School - Peñarrubia, Abra
- Luba-Tubo Catholic High School - Luba, Abra
- Our Lady of Fatima School - Bucay, Abra
- Our Lady of Guadalupe School - Lacub, Abra
- Our Lady of Lourdes High School - Manabo, Abra
- Queen of Peace High School - Canan, La Paz, Abra
- Queen of Peace High School - Poblacion, La Paz, Abra
- Sta. Theresita's High School - Poblacion, Malibcong, Abra
- St. John High School - San Juan, Abra
- St. Joseph Seminary - Pidigan, Abra
- St. Mary High School - Pidigan, Abra
- St. Paul's High School - Villaviciosa, Abra

=== Diocese of Butuan ===
- Father Saturnino Urios University, Butuan
- Saint Michael College of Caraga, Nasipit, Agusan del Norte

=== Diocese of Dipolog ===
- Rizal Memorial Institute of Dapitan City Incorporated – Dapitan City, Zamboanga del Norte
- Saint Estanislao Kostka College Inc. - Manukan, Zamboanga del Norte
- Saint Vincent's College Incorporated – Dipolog City, Zamboanga del Norte
- St. Joseph College Incorporated – Sindangan, Zamboanga del Norte

=== Diocese of Dumaguete ===
- Assisi High School – Siquijor, Siquijor
- Ave Maria Academy – Maria, Siquijor
- Bacong Holy Family High School – Bacong, Negros Oriental
- Carmel High School – Siaton, Negros Oriental
- Colegio de Santa Catalina de Alejandria – Dumaguete City
- Décor Carmeli Academy – Zamboanguita, Negros Oriental
- Immaculate Heart Academy – Tanjay City
- Santo Niño High School – Lumbangan, Mabinay, Negros Oriental
- St. Andrews School, Inc. – Amlan, Negros Oriental
- St. Anthony Academy – Tayasan, Negros Oriental
- St. Isidore the Farmer Catholic School – Lazi, Siquijor
- St. John High School – San Juan, Siquijor
- St. Vincent Academy of Larena, Siquijor – Larena, Siquijor

=== Diocese of Iba ===
- Columban College, Olongapo City

=== Diocese of Ilagan ===
- Saint Ferdinand College, Ilagan

=== Diocese of Imus ===
- Academia de San Vicente Ferrer – Indang, Cavite
- De Guia Academy of Magallanes – Magallanes, Cavite
- Fr. Michael Donoher Memorial School – Silang, Cavite
- Holy Cross Catholic School of Noveleta – Noveleta, Cavite
- Holy Family Academy of GMA – GMA, Cavite
- Infant Jesus Academy of Silang – Silang, Cavite
- Jesus, Son of Mary Academy – Dasmariñas, Cavite
- Lorenzo School of the Diocese of Chuncheon – Trece Martires City, Cavite
- Mabuting Pastol Parochial School – Dasmariñas, Cavite
- Maragondon Parochial School – Maragondon, Cavite
- Nazareth School of General Aguinaldo Cavite – Gen. E. Aguinaldo, Cavite
- Our Lady of the Pillar Catholic School – Imus City, Cavite
- Padre Pio Child Development Center – GMA Cavite
- Paraclete Foundation Community School – Silang, Cavite
- Sacred Heart of Jesus Academy of Dasmariñas Cavite, – Dasmarinas, Cavite
- Saint Augustine School – Mendez, Cavite
- Saint Augustine School – Tanza, Cavite
- Saint Francis of Assisi Academy – Tagaytay City
- Saint Gregory Academy – Indang, Cavite
- Saint John Nepomucene Catholic School – Alfonso, Cavite
- Saint Joseph Parochial School of Cavite – Alfonso, Cavite
- Saint Mary Magdalene School – Kawit, Cavite
- Saint Therese Catholic School – Noveleta, Cavite
- San Francisco de Malabon Parochial School – Gen. Trias City, Cavite
- Santo Rosario Catholic School – Rosario, Cavite
- St. Jude Parish School – Trece Martires City, Cavite
- St. Mary Magdalene Parochial School – Amadeo, Cavite
- St. Michael’s Institute – Bacoor City, Cavite,

=== Diocese of Malaybalay ===
- Apu Palamguwan Cultural Education Center
- Father Leoni Memorial School, Inc.
- Good Counsel High School, Inc.
- Holy Cross High School
- Immaculate Concepcion High School of Guinuyoran, Inc.
- La Purisima High School, Inc.
- Loyola School of Don Carlos, Inc.
- Our Lady of Fatima High School, Inc.
- Pangantucan Community High School
- Pilar High School, Inc.
- Sacred Heart Academy of Valencia, Inc.
- San Agustin Institute of Technology
- San Andres Academy of Talakag, Inc.
- San Isidro College of Malaybalay Bukidnon, Inc.
- San Isidro High School - Kadingilan, Inc.
- San Isidro High School of Malipayon, Inc.
- San Isidro Parish Learning Center of Pangantucan, Inc.
- San Jose High School of Sinayawan, Inc.
- Santo Nino High School of Dangcagan, Inc.
- St. Isidore Academy of Bukidnon, Inc. Sinanglanan
- St. Joseph High School of Laligan, Inc.
- St. Joseph High School of Talakag, Inc.
- St. Joseph’s Children’s Centre of the Ursuline Missionaries of the Sacred Heart Phil. Inc. (Cabanglasan)
- St. Michael High School of Linabo, Inc.
- St. Therese School of Miarayon
- Stella Matutina Academy of Bukidnon, Inc.
- Xavier de Damulog High School
- Xavier de Kibangay High School

=== Diocese of Marbel ===
- Notre Dame Cathedral Elementary School, Cotabato City, South Cotabato
- Notre Dame Of Glan, Sarangani
- Notre Dame Of Kiamba, Sarangani
- Notre Dame Of Maasim, Sarangani
- Notre Dame Of Maitum Sarangani
- Notre Dame Of New Iloilo, Tantangan, South Cotabato
- Notre Dame Of Norala, South Cotabato
- Notre Dame Of San Jose, Koronadal, South Cotabato
- Notre Dame Of Sto. Niño, South Cotabato

== Independent ==
- Angeles University Foundation, Angeles
- Holy Angel University, Angeles
- University of Saint Anthony, Iriga
