= DBHS =

DBHS may refer to:

- Daniel Boone Area High School, Birdsboro, Pennsylvania, United States
- Daniel Boone High School (Tennessee), Gray, Tennessee, United States
- David Brearley High School, Kenilworth, New Jersey, United States
- Deerfield Beach High School, Deerfield Beach, Florida, United States
- Diamond Bar High School, Diamond Bar, California, United States
- Dobyns-Bennett High School, Kingsport, Tennessee, United States
- Don Bosco High School, Lagawe, Ifugao, Philippines
- Drummoyne Boys' High School, Sydney, New South Wales, Australia
