= Beaterio de Terciarias Agustinas Recoletas =

Roman Catholic convent in the Philippines

- Beaterio de Terciarias Agustinas Recoletas
- Beaterio de San Sebastián de Calumpang
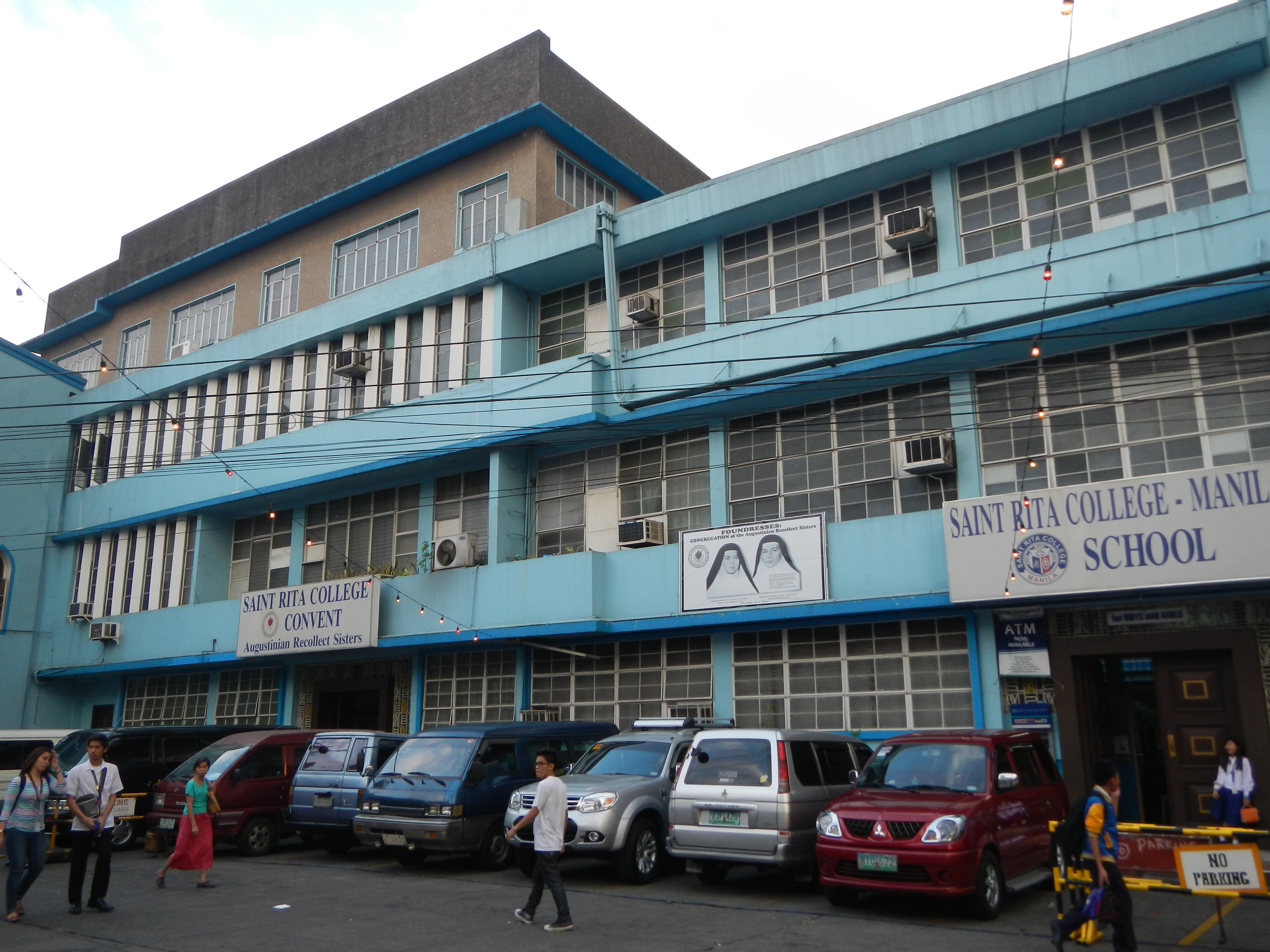
- Saint Rita College Convent

- Location within Metro Manila
- 14.5998°N 120.9897°E
- Country: Philippines
- Denomination: Roman Catholic

History
- Founded: 1731
- Founder(s): Dionisia de Santa Maria Mitas Talangpaz and Cecilia Rosa de Jesús Talangpaz

Architecture
- Style: Neo-Gothic

The Beaterio de Terciarias Agustinas Recoletas was the oldest convent for the Order of Augustinian Recollects meeting the material and spiritual needs of pious women in the early 18th-century Philippines. The beaterio was founded by Dionisia de Santa María Mitas Talangpaz and Cecilia Rosa de Jesús Talangpaz, two biological and religious Filipino sisters from Barangay San Miguel in Calumpit, Bulacan. The convent's name was later changed to Beaterio de San Sebastián de Calumpang, now the Congregation of the Augustinian Recollect Sisters. It is one of the three continuing congregation founded for native women in Asia after the Amantes de la Croix founded in Vietnam in 1670, and the Beaterio de la Compañía de Jesús (now the Religious of the Virgin Mary) founded in Manila in 1684. The original site of the beaterio was located inside Saint Rita College - Manila, one of the first three houses of the Augustinian Recollect Sisters, before it wasdamaged.

== History ==
The two Talangpaz sisters, who belonged to a religious bloodline, decided to leave their comfortable life in pursuit of their spiritual calling even after their request for permission to wear the habit of mantelata were repeatedly turned down. When they heard that the Recollects admitted Filipino women into their Third Order, they proceeded to the Shrine of Our Lady of Mount Carmel in the Church of San Sebastián in Manila and rented a nipa hut in Bilibid Viejo behind the church apse in which two other native beatas soon joined them. By the help of Fray Juan de Santo Tomás de Aquino, OAR, they revealed to the priests their desire to don the habit of mantelata. After their credentials were carefully checked and their petition for the habit was approved, they were incorporated as tertiaries of the Order. They received the habit on the 16th day of July 1725. The nipa hut they rented together with the other beatas was the beginning of the congregation.

An unexpected crisis happened in the beaterio when it drew the attention of more aspirants than it could manage. To resolve the crisis, Fray Diego de San José, OAR, the prior of San Sebastián, impulsively demanded back the habits he had bestowed on the Talangpaz sisters and associates, and ordered they vacate the house in the convent garden before he immediately demolished the house. The sisters later sought out the prior himself to assure him with these words: "Fray Diego, please bear with us. Now you spurn us and send us away, but you can be certain that later, you will be pleased to receive us back and grant us the holy habit again, and not only the two of us but others as well whom Our Lady of Carmel will call to give us company. We have great hopes that she will grant us this favor to our deep joy and that of the Recollect fathers, too. But for now, we have to be patient and suffer till Our Lord and his Most Holy Mother will have mercy on us."

Haunted by the sisters' words, San José requested the Provincial of the Order to grant the women with the habit of mantelatas and that the community of beatas be assisted by the Recollects in accordance with the Sacred Constitutions of the Order. Consequently, the re-investiture of the Talangpaz Sisters was held in the year 1728, probably on the Feast of Our Lady of Mount Carmel. They re-adopted the religious names they took in 1725, namely – Sor Dionisia de Santa María and Sor Cecilia Rosa de Jesús.

=== Construction of the Convent ===
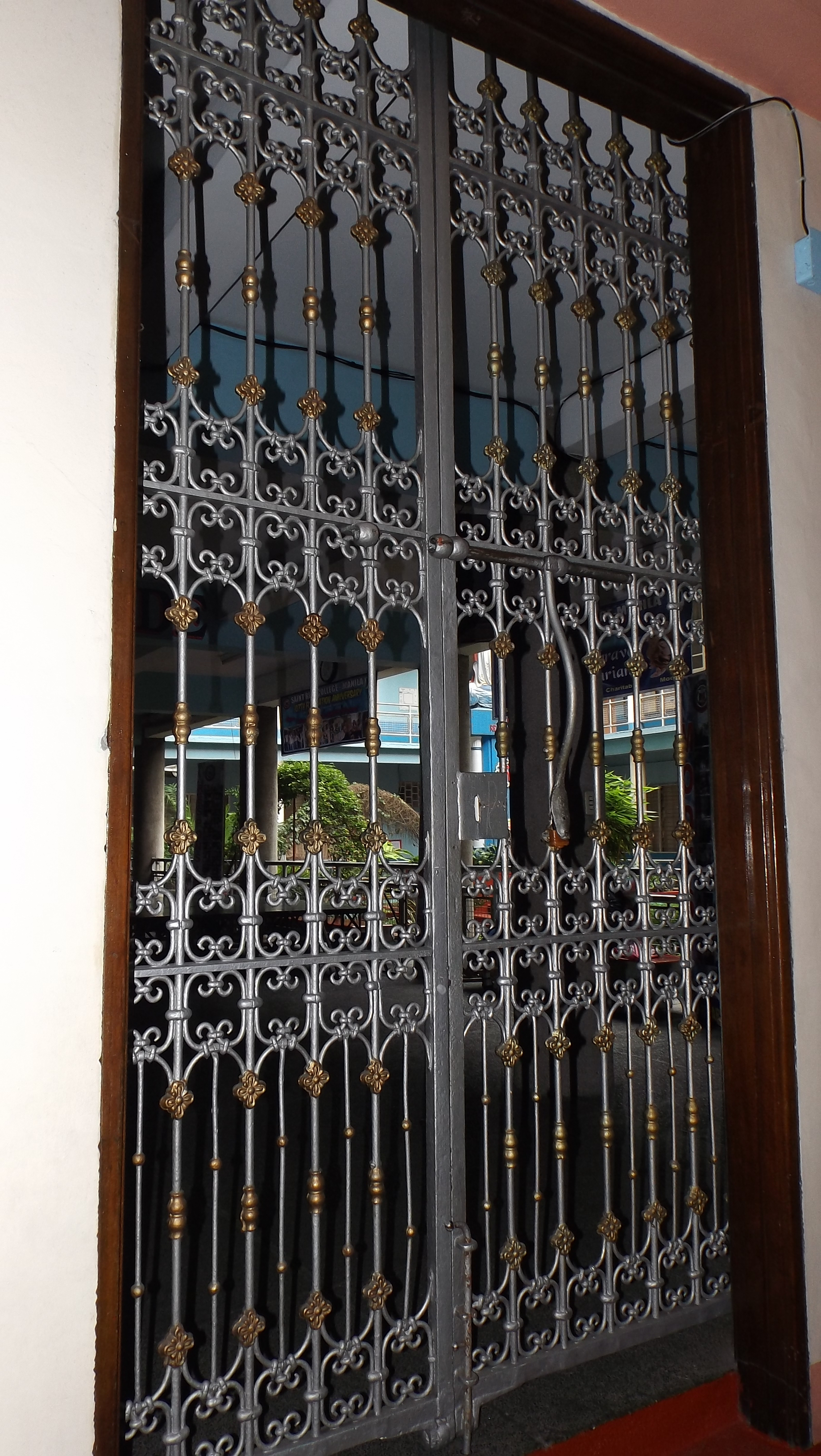
Spanish steel grill gate, the oldest remnant of the old Beaterio.

In 1731, the Beaterio achieved its formal foundation. Fray Andrés de San Fulgencio undertook the construction of a more permanent house for the Recollect Tertiaries, the first religious women. Fray Benito de San Pablo, Superior of San Sebastán at that time, solicited donations from benefactors such as Brother General, Sergeant Major D. José Beltrán de Salazar, and Don José Barreto, with construction lasting until 1747. The convent had a long, spacious living room divided into cells, and at the end was a kitchenette and bathroom made of concrete. The sisters lived in this building until 1907. To respond to the growing needs of the Church, the Beaterio expanded and established their first three houses: Saint Rita College - Manila, Colegio de Santa Mónica in Cavite City and Colegio de San Joséin Cuyo, Palawan.

== Renovations ==
The first house where the first sisters or beatas resided were made of cane and nipa. The second house, which was bigger than the first, became roofless after the 1880 Luzon earthquakes. The third house of stronger materials, now part of Saint Rita College - Manila, is still standing today, with a chapel added on June 1, 1907.

== Gallery ==
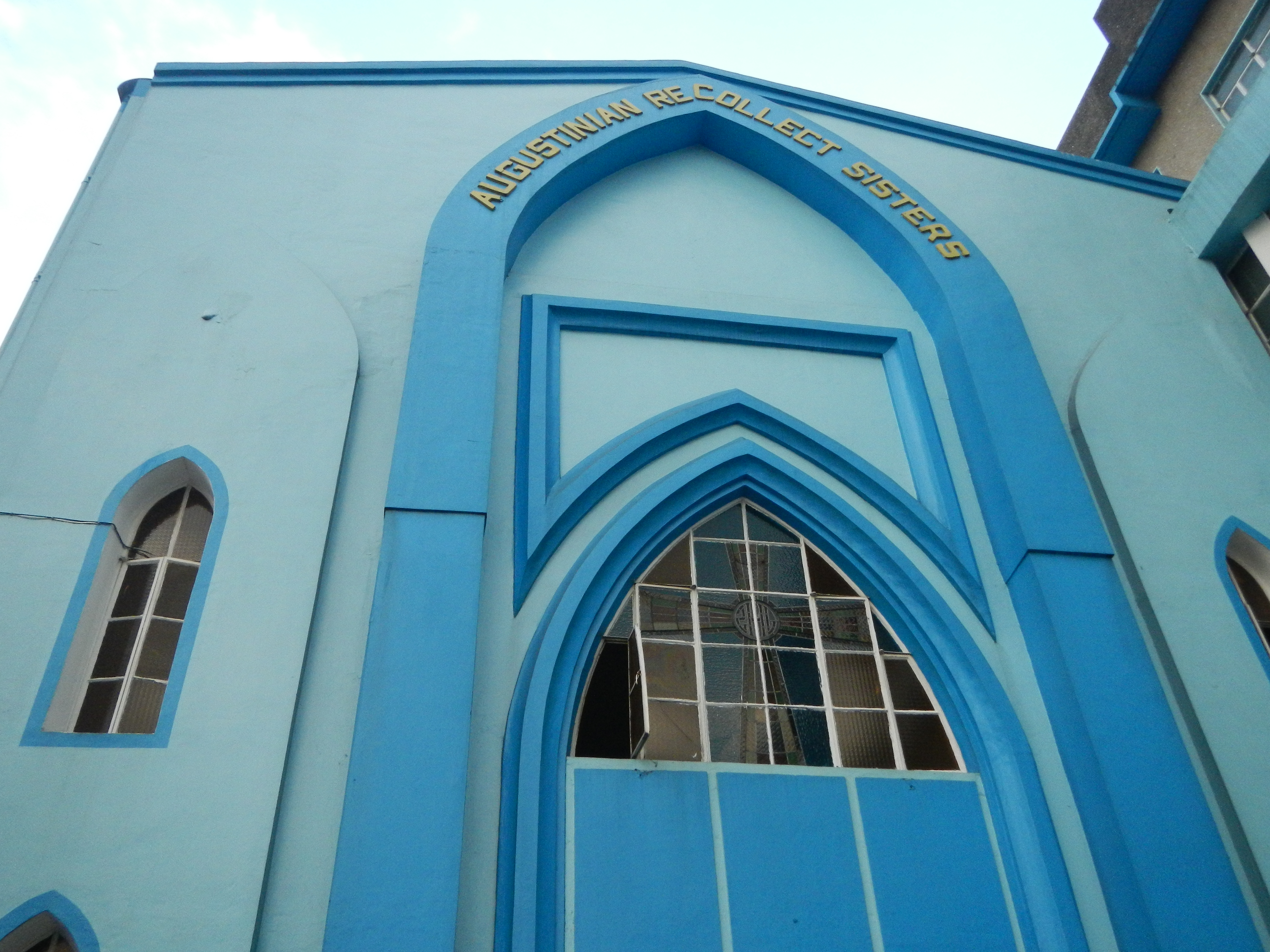
Gothic window

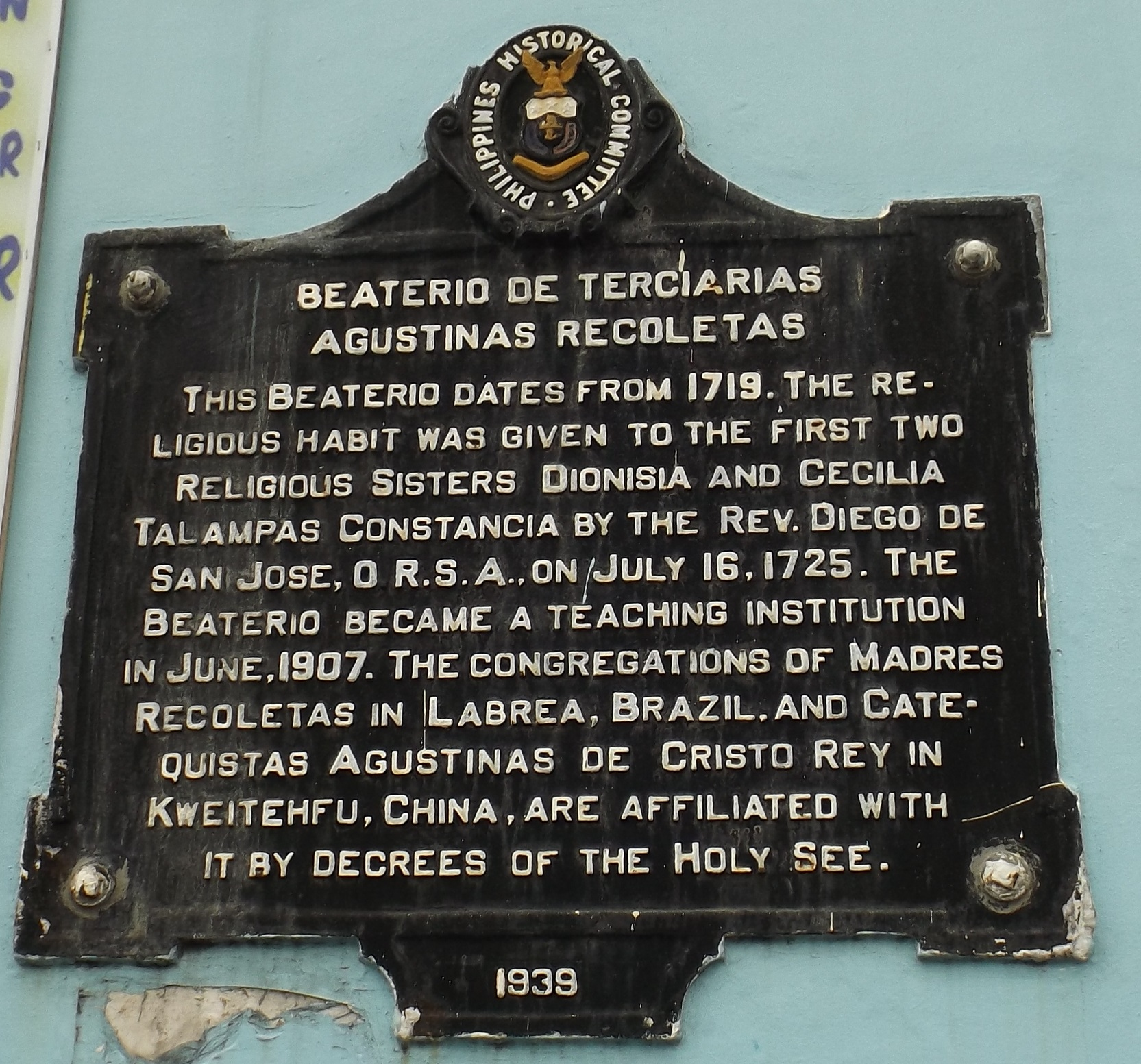
Historical Marker

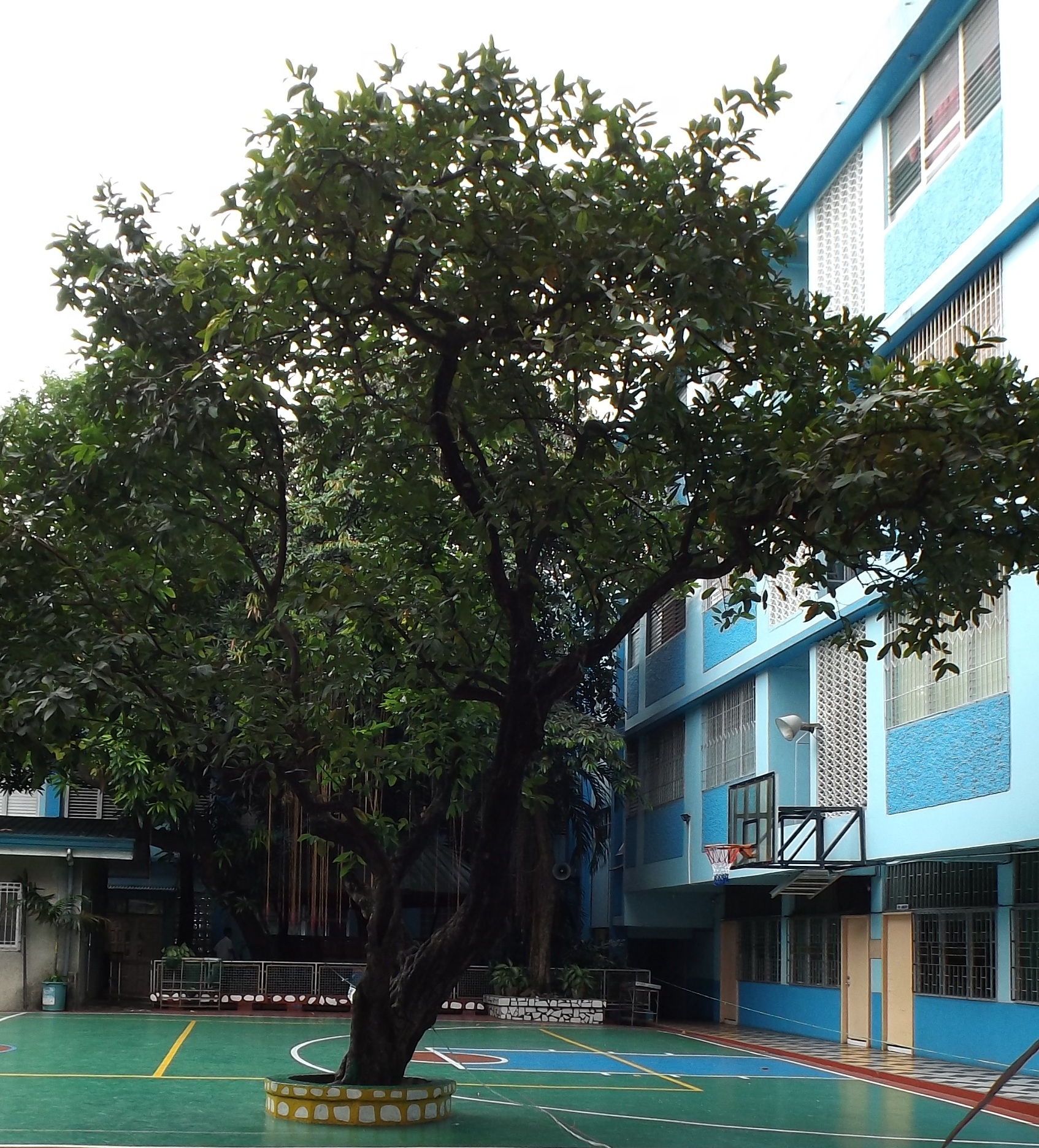
Old kalumpang (Sterculia foetida) tree

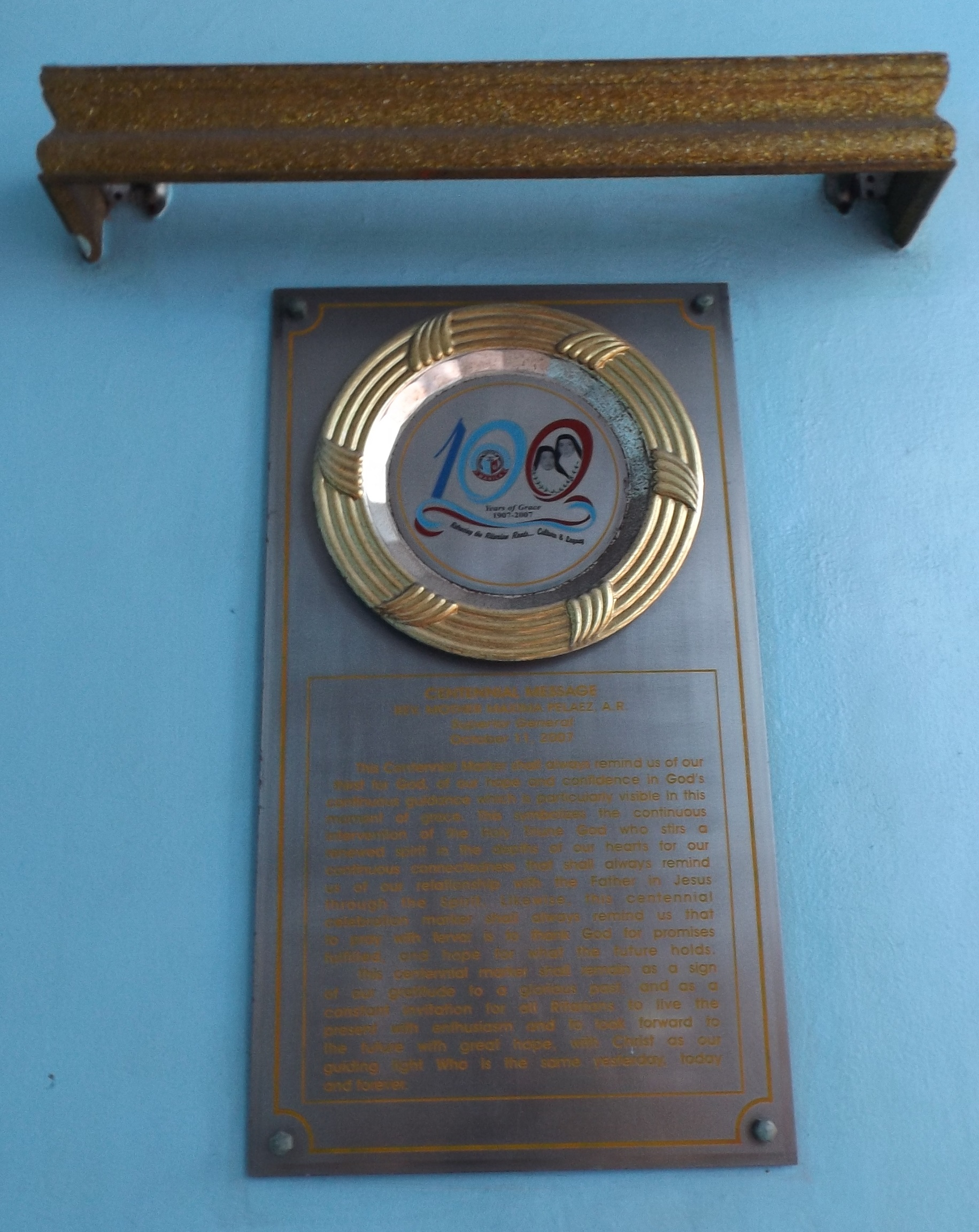
Centennial marker

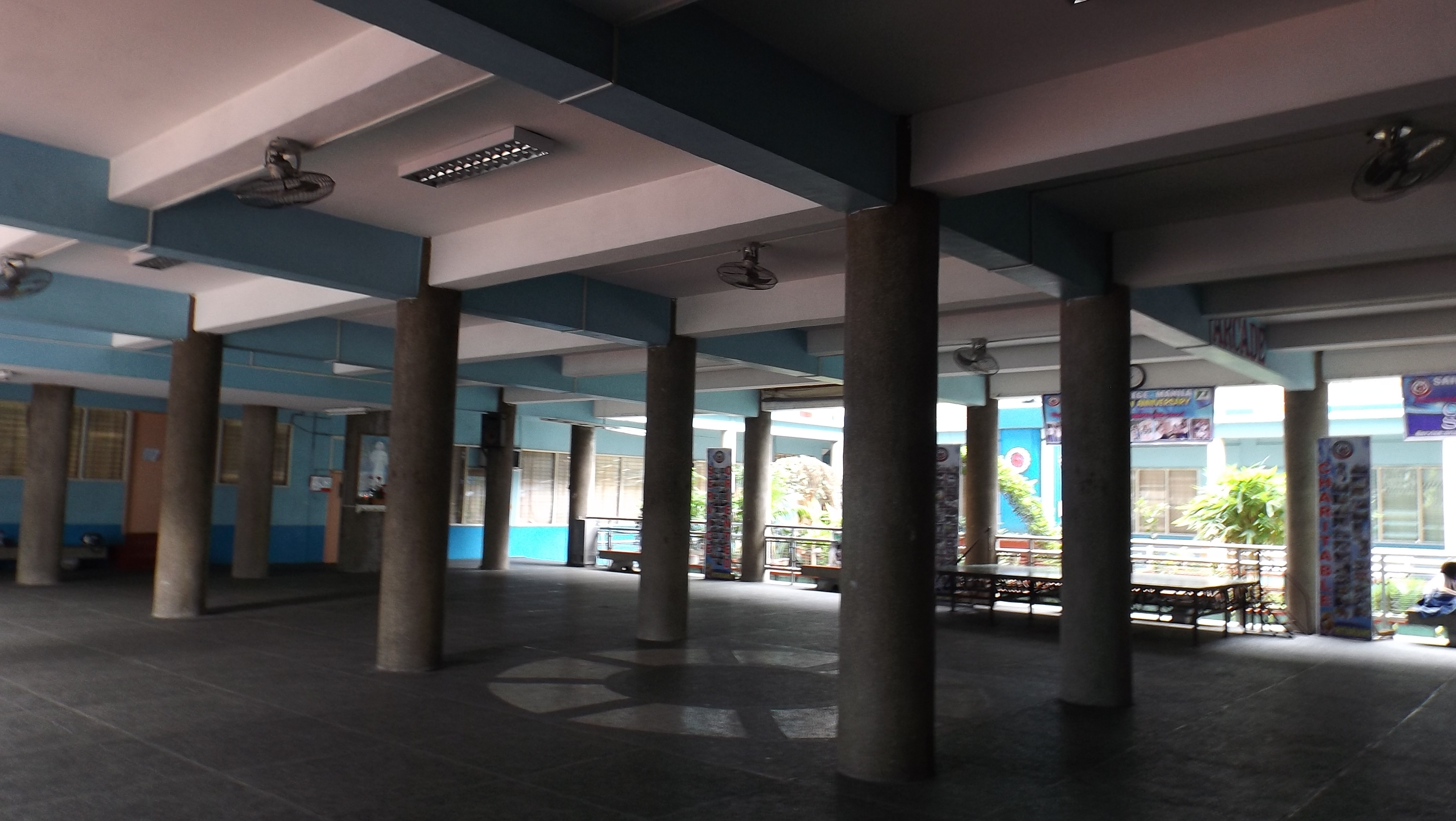
Original site of the Beaterio, now part of the lobby area inside Saint Rita College - Manila

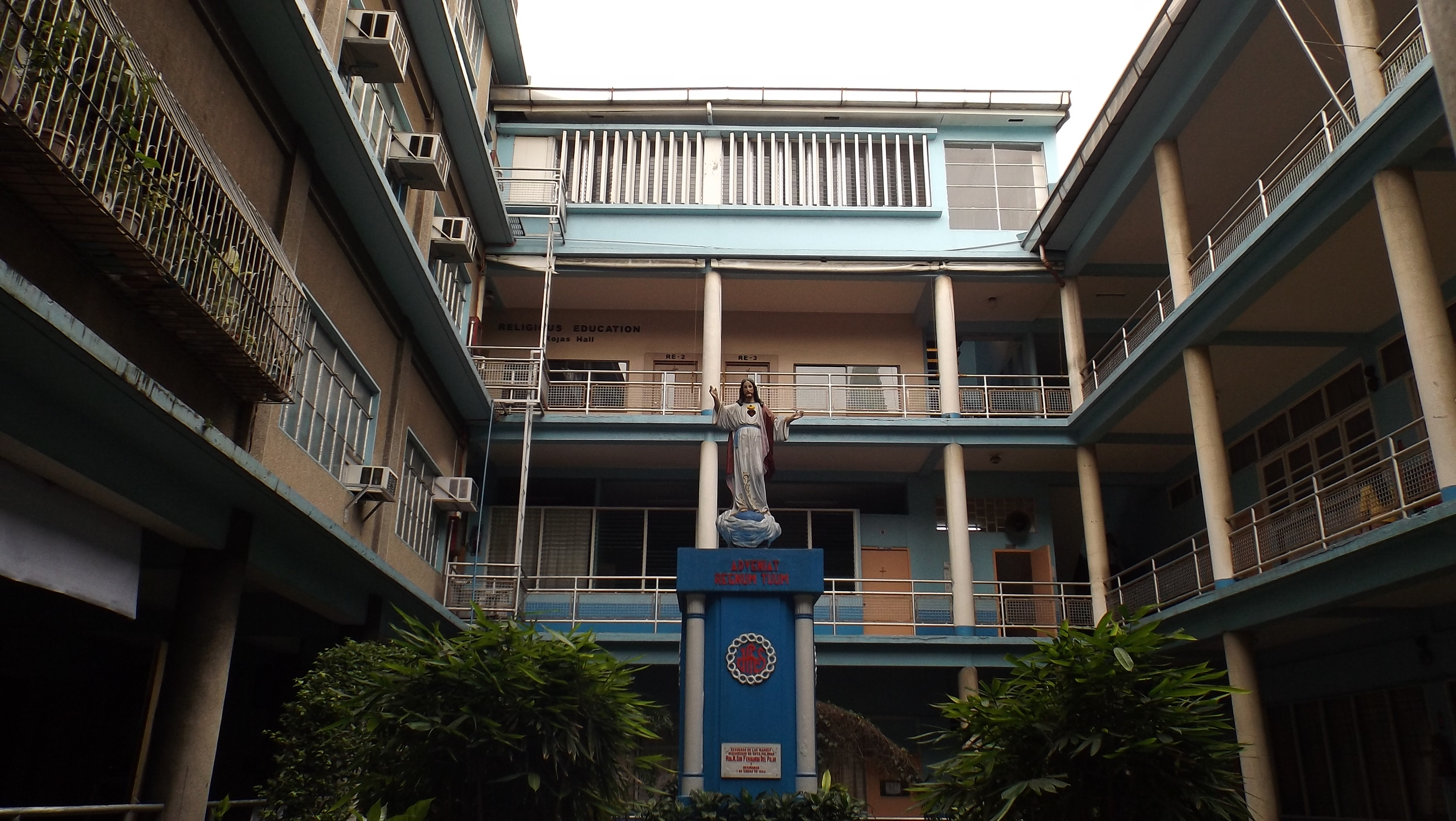
Sacred Heart Garden, where the sisters found "solace in contemplation"

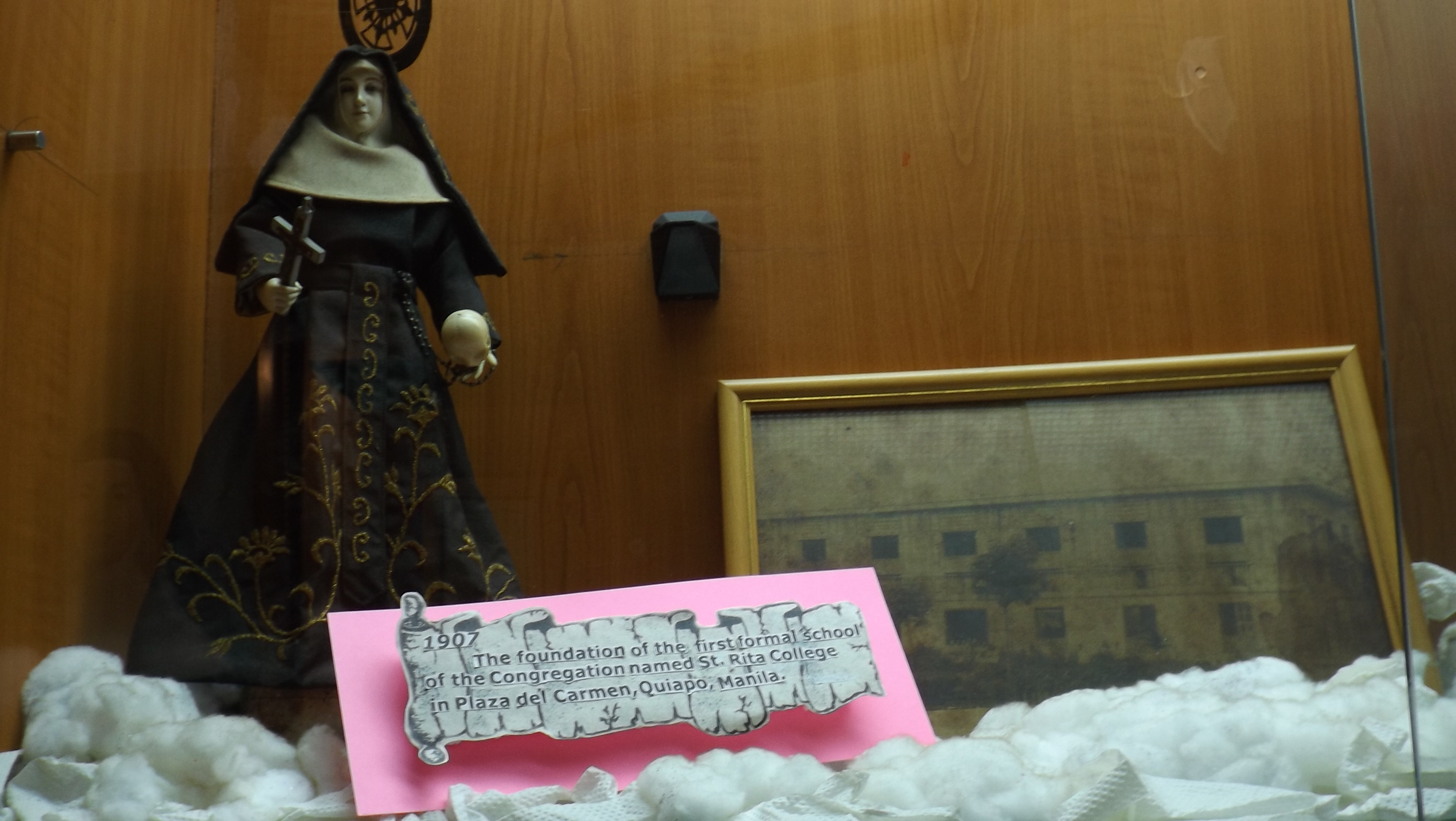
Old photo of St. Rita College in Plaza del Carmen

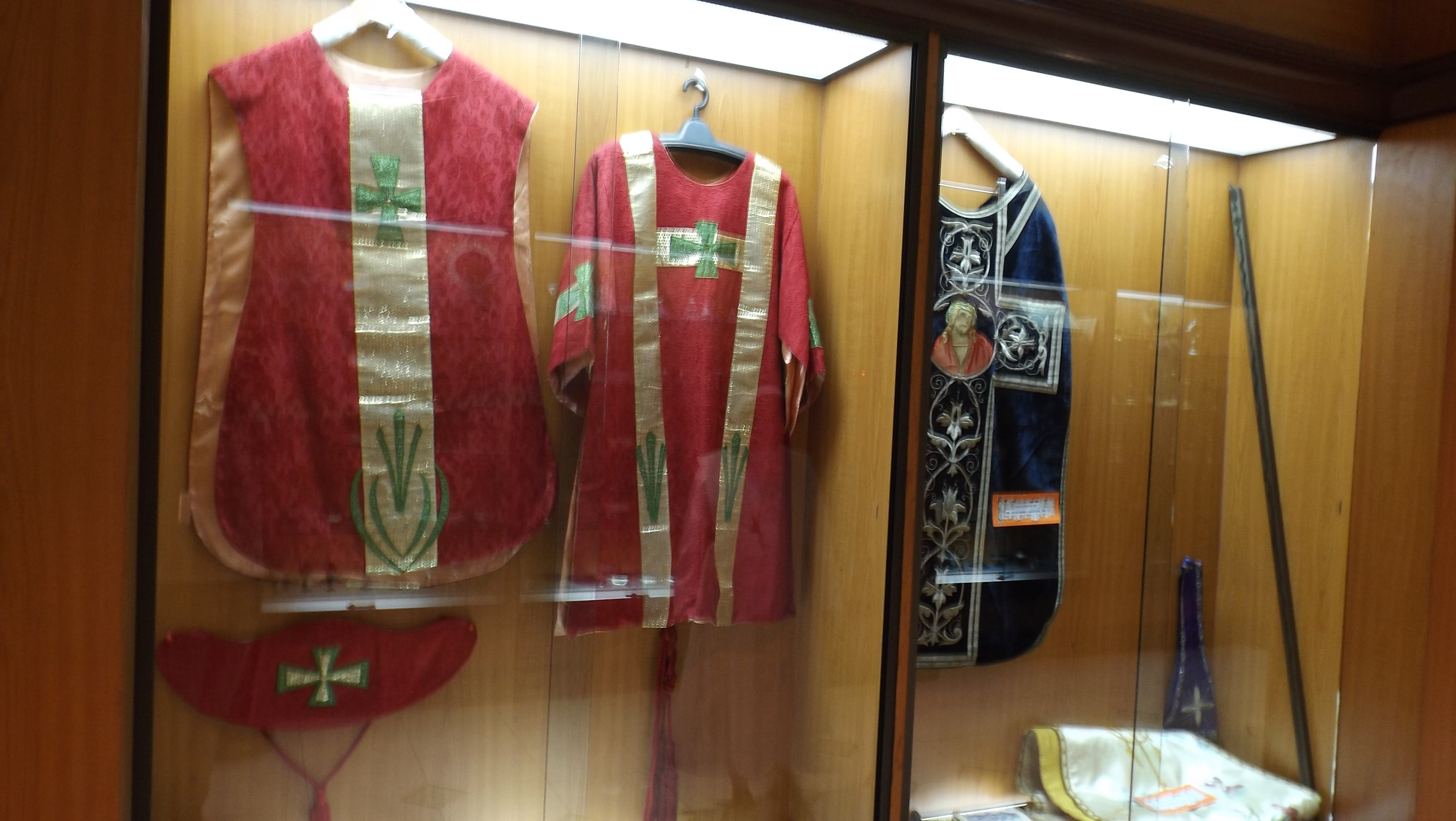
Liturgical vestments embroidered by the Talangpaz sisters

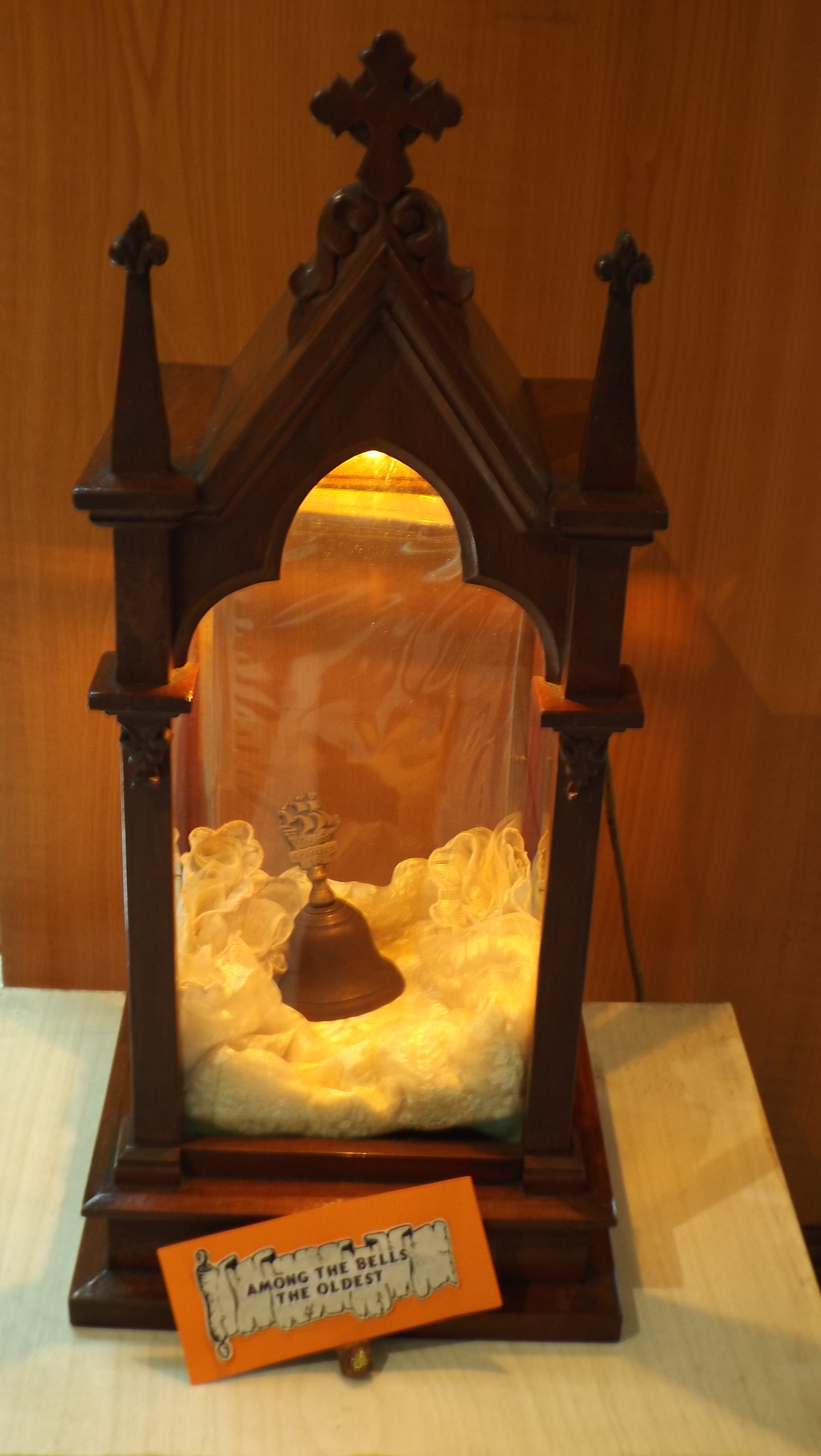
The oldest bell used in the time of the Talangpaz sisters

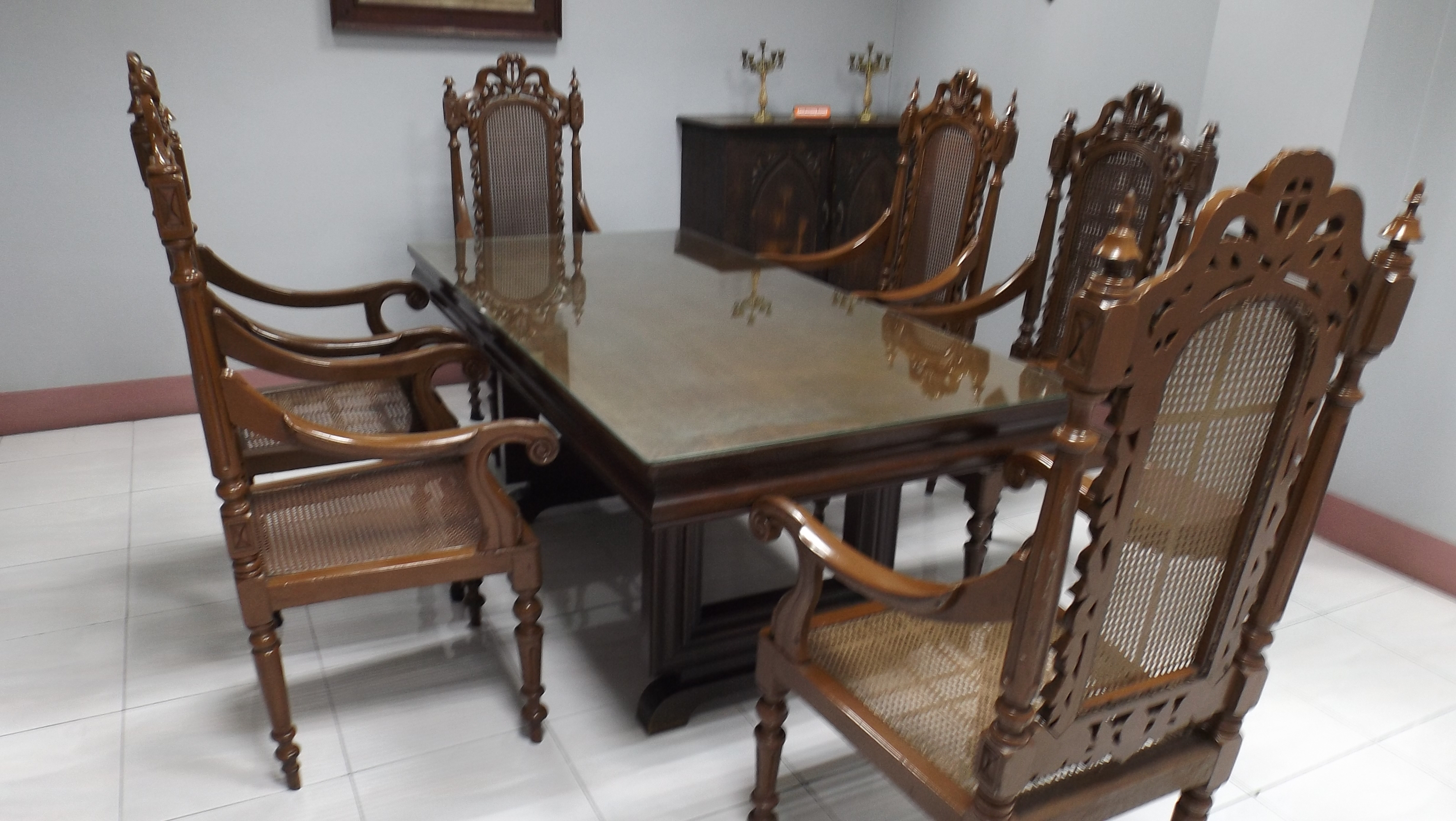
Furniture from the time of the Talangpaz sisters
