= Notre Dame of Genio Edcor Inc. =

Roman Catholic school in Cotabato, Philippines

- Notre Dame ng Genio Edcor' (Filipino)
- "That which pleases God. I strive to do always" (Jn 8:29)
- Former names: Notre Dame of Edcor (1958–1970)
- Motto: Latin: Ad Astra per Aspera; English: Through Hardship to the Stars
- Type: Private, Roman Catholic
- Established: 1958; 68 years ago
- Founders: Bp. Gerard Mongeau, OMI; Bp. George Dion, OMI
- Academic affiliations: NDEA, CEAP
- Principal: Marilou D. Tolentino
- Location: ND Avenue, Brgy. Mirasol Alamada, Cotabato, Philippines; 7°23′03″N 124°32′53″E
- Hymn: Notre Dame, Our Mother; Notre Dame March
- Colors: Green and Gold
- Sporting affiliations: NDEA Meet, GMA Meet, COPRISA Meet

Notre Dame of Genio Edcor, Inc.(Old name: Notre Dame of Edcor ) is a private, Catholic academic institution run by the Oblates of Notre Dame located in Alamada, Cotabato, Philippines, making this school the first Notre Dame school administered by the OND Sisters. This institution is a member of the Notre Dame Educational Association. Established in 1958, it has been one of the pioneering schools under the Notre Dame Educational System in the province of North Cotabato, Philippines.

== Historical background of Notre Dame of Genio Edcor ==
In 1957, the settlers of EDCOR requested the late Archbishop Gerard Mongeau, OMI, DD, (February 4, 1900 – October 31, 1994) to establish a school for their children. The bishop's response was to let the people construct the building, then he will provide the administrators. In answer to the request, the wooden materials for the construction of the building were offered by the farm Administrator, retired Major Dalmacio Tecson. Labor was free as local residents volunteered their services. The Army Chaplain, Fr. Manuel Vacante supervised the construction. It was a seven-room building with one room for the laboratory, one room for the library and one room for offices and faculty. The building was completed in time for the school year 1958–1959, offering courses for first and second year high school.

The administration of the school was offered to the Oblates of Notre Dame (OND sister), a community of women organized on 1956 in Cotabato City. The ONDs accepted the offer because the school was a good venue for Catechism. The fourth year students will be trained to be catechists to the public elementary pupils. Notre Dame of Genio Edcor is a small school located in a town where there is no other public secondary school existing during that time and poverty is keenly felt by the people. In such a given context the school ministry strives to bring hope and joy to the students and the community it serves.

It will be interesting to know what the situation was, when EDCOR was first visited on May 14, 1958, by Fr. George Dion, OMI with Sisters Estrella Adre, Juliana del Castillo and Lina Carbonell. Sr. Estrella entered in the codex the following:

It was an exciting thrilling ride over bumpy road in a dilapidated delivery car. Fr. Dion's wagon couldn't go through the first river. The ride was tiresome but the missionaries in the making got a big thrill out of it. There was that feeling of being participants in God's ways of penetrating the most difficult missions.

— Sr. Adre, OND

On May 26, 1958, Fr. George Dion accompanied the first ONDs who were assigned to start the new Notre Dame School in Alamada: Miss Ma. Estrella Adre, Soledad Amigable, Mercedes Favor, Prexedes Biclar. School equipment, supplies and other miscellaneous things were brought to the new school from Cotabato City. On June 10, 1958, it was noted that the enrollment was increasing and hence they saw the need for more teachers.

NDGE is located in EDCOR which is an acronym for Economic Development Corporation. This was the "land for the landless" program by the late President Ramon Magsaysay. It was intended for HUKS- a popular group of dissidents in the country so that they could acquire land to cultivate. Resolution No. 376 dated March 10, 1953 gave birth to this project and the manager of the Project EDCOR was retired Major Dalmacio Tecson.

When the management of the place was turned over to the civil government, the name of the place was changed to ALAMADA, in memory and honor of the great and powerful late Datu Alamada who fought against foreign opposition and tyrannies. Kitacubong was the heart of his kingdom. In 1968 Resolution No. 38 which is the renaming of the municipality to Alamada, separate and distinct form the municipality of Libungan, Cotabato. Meanwhile, the school has retained its name Notre Dame of Genio Edcor.

The first ever Graduation was in 1962. The Notre Dame of Genio Edcor, Inc. celebrated its 50th Golden Founding Anniversary in 2008.

As the years went by more students enrolled at NDGEI and hence an annex building with four rooms was added. The flooring was cemented. The last room was raised by one meter to serve as stage for PTA meetings and for school programs.

== Timeline of school administrators ==
#	Year	Name
1	July 1958 - August 1958	Sr. Estrella P. Adre, OND +
2	August 1958 - 1963 & 1972 - 1973	Sr. Mary Rose B. Quijano, OND +
3	1963 - 1964	Sr. Eugenia T. Fabella, OND
4	1964-1966	Sr. Salvacion S. Pagsuguiron, OND
5	1966-1967	Sr. Lily A. Lauron, OND +
6	1967-1969	Sr. Victoria A. Panopio, OND +
7	1969-1970	Sr. Rosario Clarice C. Javier, OND
8	1970-1972 & 1973-1974	Sr. Regina C. Javier, OND
9	1974-1979	Sr. Rita Marie D. Cuevas, OND
10	1979-1980	Sr. Estrella M. Corotan, OND
11	1980-1981	Sr. Maria-Palma T. Ronquillo, OND
12	1981-1983	Sr. Sonia S. Rafael, OND
13	1983-1996	Sr. Leonila N. Dolina, OND +
14	1990-1992	Sr. Alicia A. Amparo, OND
15	1992-1994	Sr. Madeleine V. Bibal, OND
16	1996-2002	Sr. Nida C. Macahilo, OND
17	2002-2009	Sr. Estrellita M. Del Socorro, OND
18	2009-2012	Sr. Thelma B. Arguilles, OND
19	2012-2015	Sr. Maria-Palma T. Ronquillo, OND
20	2015-2017	Sr. Maria Clarita C. Salanatin, OND
21	2017-2018	Sr. Alejandra B. Villarosa, OND
22	2018-2019	Sr. Carolina A. Motril, OND
23	2019–present	Sr. Marilou D. Tolentino, OND

== Curriculum ==
Notre Dame of Genio Edcor, Inc. adopts the Department of Education's K to 12 Basic Education Program for its Junior High School up to Senior High School. The school is using the DepEd Grading System which uses the Average base Grading computation in all year level. The school also uses a Computerized Grading System created by a private company called DISAT.(Digital Information System and Technology) wherein computation of grades are made much more efficient and convenient for the teachers.

== Modular Learning ==
For remote learning, assessments are home-based and self-managed. These assessments are authentic tasks that measure the learner's proficiency in terms of the competencies. These tasks closely resemble actual situations in which competencies are applied. This alternative delivery mode is given to Grades 7-12 learners who can manage their own learning, and use resources like Kto12 aligned Modules and Self-Instructional Materials and other quality teacher-made modules. Each teacher is a modular learning facilitator who has the responsibility to validate students’ learning through their responses on every activity in the module.
