= Assumption College of Davao =

Roman Catholic college in Davao City, Philippines

- Kolehiyo ng Assumption Davao (Filipino)
- Former names: Assumption Academy of Davao (1958–1978); Assumption School of Davao (1978–1998)
- Motto: Fide ad Solidarietatis (Latin)
- Motto in English: Faith and Solidarity
- Type: Private Roman Catholic non-profit coeducational Basic and Higher education institution
- Established: 1958; 68 years ago
- Founder: Daughters of Mary of the Assumption
- Religious affiliation: Roman Catholic (Missionaries of the Assumption)
- Academic affiliations: PAASCU
- President: Marietta B. Banayo, m.a.
- Location: J.P. Cabaguio Avenue; Davao City, Davao del Sur, Philippines; 7°05′17″N 125°37′27″E
- Colors: Blue
- Website: assumptiondavao.edu.ph
- Location in Mindanao Location in the Philippines

The Assumption College of Davao, also referred to by its acronym ACD, is a private Catholic basic and higher education institution run by the Missionaries of the Assumption in Davao City, Philippines. It was established by the Daughters of Mary of the Assumption (FMA) in 1958. Formerly named the Assumption School of Davao (ASD), it was renamed the Assumption College of Davao (ACD) in 1998, on its 40th anniversary.

== History ==
When the local church of Davao was starting to rebuild and reorganize after the Second World War, Archbishop Clovis Thibault wanted the religious groups to take part in the reconstruction by establishing centers of learning in the archdiocese that would offer solid and formal education for children from all walks of life.

Acting on this invitation, two members of the Daughters of Mary of the Assumption or F.M.A., Sr. Elodie Marie Richard (Mother del Annunciation), and Sr. Oveline Doucet (Sr. Gaetace) of Campbellton, New Brunswick, Canada came over. In obedience to their charism of the preferential option for the marginalized poor, the first school the FMA organized after their arrival in 1954 was the Assumption School of Nabunturan in Davao de Oro Province. Later, it was renamed Assumption College of Nabunturan.

In 1958, on an "open, swampy and desolate" parcel of land in the suburb community of Agdao, the F.M.A. opened a city-based school, the Assumption Academy of Davao. The academy started as an exclusive school for girls with elementary and high school departments. At the opening of classes, it registered 170 enrollees, consisting of 84 elementary pupils and 86 high school students. The elementary offered only Grades I, V and VI, with one section in each level. The succeeding years saw the expansion of its curricular offering to several levels of learning to meet the needs of the youth and the community. Soon after, it was granted permission by the Ministry of Education, Culture, and Sports to open the college department in 1961. The college started with 44 students who enrolled in the first year level. However, barely twelve years later, it had to be phased out due to a lack of teachers holding master's degrees, among other reasons. In 1964, it started accepting boys in elementary. Three years later, the kindergarten program was offered. In the next seventeen years, it became a co-educational institution with students from different social strata. Thus, additional structures had to be constructed, such as the gymnasium. In 1976, the three-storey concrete building for the grade school was erected. Soon after, another two-storey edifice which housed the high school library and the administrative offices was built. More construction of facilities for academic and non-academic purposes followed. In 1978, the school was renamed Assumption School of Davao (ASD).

The school maintains an active approach to social justice, including campaigning against a coal-fired power station in Davao, and in favor of restrictions on disposable plastics and junk food.

== School campus ==
=== Queen of the Angels building ===
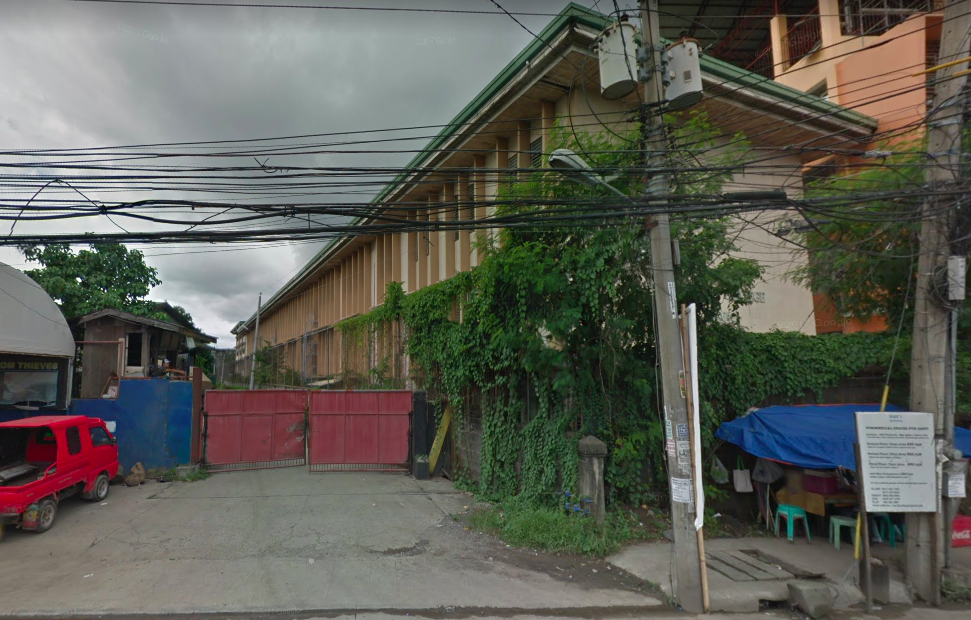
Queen of the Angels Building

The Queen of the Angels building is a three-story building that houses the preschool, primary and junior high school rooms. Facilities of this building include the speech laboratory, computer laboratories, restrooms, the primary audio-visual room, the home economics room, the elementary science laboratory, and the library & the offices of the principal, secretary office, and the primary & junior high school faculty room.

=== Queen of Peace building ===
The Queen of Peace is a four-story building that houses the senior high school classrooms. The academic supervisors' office, speech laboratory, biology laboratory, chemistry laboratory, physics laboratory, integrated science laboratory, home economics room, computer laboratories, guidance office, the school clinic, high school audio-visual room, chapel, Human Resource Office, and the Community Extension Services coordinator's office are found in this building.

=== Queen of the Prophets building ===
The Queen of the Prophets is a five-storey building that houses the registrar's office, finance department room, and college and high school libraries. This building also has a roof deck.

=== Queen of the Universe building ===
The Queen of the Universe building is a five-storey building which was inaugurated in 2016. It houses the senior high school rooms, the home economics room, a senior high school library, the office of the school president, the external communications office, the board room, and the research and planning officer's office. It is also the school's first building that features restrooms for members of the LGBT community and people with disabilities. The building also contains an auditorium, which is located on the rooftop.

=== Queen of the Apostles building ===
The Queen of the Apostles building is the tallest building in the school, used by the college department and its students for academic purposes. It contains rooms for college students, computer laboratories, hotel and restaurant management instructional room and other facilities the students and professors need.

=== Gymnasium ===
The school has a gymnasium used for school events, monthly and weekly announcements from the school, activities, programs, and sports.

=== Canteen and convent ===
A building houses a school-operated canteen and the convent for the Missionaries of the Assumption.

== Student life ==
=== Events and programs ===
- Intramurals – is an annual major school event held every August or October to commemorate the feast of the Our Lady of the Assumption, who is the school's patroness. It is a three-day event, with a holy eucharistic celebration celebrated on the first day, and the rest of the planned activities are held on the remaining days. In this event, the school is divided into four team colors; namely, Blue Talions, Red Calvaries, Yellow Sentinels and Rajah Saffrons. These four teams battle in contests and competitions, from sports to intellectual games.
- Paskuhan & Speechfest – an annual major school event held every December wherein students showcase their performances related to Christmas or speech. It is a combination of Paskuhan and Speechfest.
- Sama-Sama – is an annual major school event held every February wherein the students, employees and selected parents present performances related to the event's theme. Visitors from selected schools would also take part in some of the activities. It is a three-day event; a holy mass is celebrated on the first day. Ground demonstrations and other activities are held on the remaining days.
- Monthly Holy Mass – The school conducts monthly holy eucharist celebrations, wherein the whole school community is called to join this monthly celebration. As an institution established by Catholic nuns and continually run by the Missionaries of the Assumption, conducting such masses is significant.

=== Athletics ===
The Assumption College of Davao has joined different athletic contests from the divisional, regional and even the national level. The school is known for sports, especially basketball. ACD has joined athletic meets, such as the Davao Association of Catholic Schools (DACS) Sportsfest held every September, the Davao City Athletic Association (DCAA) Meet, the Davao Regional Athletics Association (DAVRAA) Meet, and the Palarong Pambansa.
