= Notre Dame of Abuyog =

Roman Catholic school in Leyte, Philippines

Location
- Abuyog, Leyte; Philippines
- Coordinates: 10°44′55″N 125°00′38″E

Information
- Type: Private Roman Catholic Basic education institution
- Religious affiliation(s): Roman Catholic (Oblates of Notre Dame)
- Affiliation: Notre Dame Educational Association

Notre Dame of Abuyog is a private Catholic school run by the Oblates of Notre Dame (OND). in Abuyog, Leyte, Philippines The School is a member of Notre Dame Educational Association, a gathering of Notre Dame Schools in the Philippines.
