= San Lorenzo College of Davao =

Roman Catholic school in Davao City, Philippines

- Dalubhasaang San Lorenzo ng Davao
- Former names: Bright Horizon Learning Center (2001 - 2002); Foundation School of San Lorenzo Ruiz (2002 - 2008)
- Motto: Spanish: Yo haga muero mas Bien mil los muertos que renunciar mi fé English: I Would Rather Die A Thousand Deaths Than To Renounce My Faith
- Type: Private, Catholic
- Established: 2001; 25 years ago
- Founders: San Lorenzo Ruiz Socio-Economic Development Foundation, Inc.
- Religious affiliation: Roman Catholic (Archdiocese of Davao)
- Principal: Jennifer Carreon
- Location: Lorenzville Homes, Ulas, Brgy. Talomo, Davao City,, Davao del Sur, Philippines; 7°03′08″N 125°32′43″E
- Campus: Urban 1 hectare (10,000 m^{2})
- Colors: Green
- Website: Official website

San Lorenzo College of Davao, also referred to by its acronym SLCDI, is a private Catholic basic education institution run by the Archdiocese of Davao in Davao City, Philippines. It was founded in 2002.

== History ==
Lay leaders of the San Lorenzo Ruiz Parish led by Parish priest, Emmanuel D. Cifra established a foundation to tackle poverty in their community and focused on the socio-economical needs of their parishioners. The foundation was registered with the Securities and Exchange Commission (SEC) on September 4, 1998, with the name San Lorenzo Ruiz Socio-Economic Development Foundation, Inc (SALORDEDFI).

The executive director of SALORDEDFI, Marianito Gentallan who served the post from 1999 to 2001, signed a memorandum of agreement with Holy Cross of Davao College President, Maria Iris Melliza, on March 15, 2001, which led to the establishment of the Bright Horizon Learning Center. On July 16, 2002, Bright Horizon changed its name to the Foundation School of San Lorenzo Ruiz, Inc. (FSSLRI) which was registered with SEC on September 19, 2002.

FSSLRI was given a government permit by the Region XI office of the Department of Education on October 14, 2002, to offer kindergarten education starting the 2002–2003 school year. The educational institution transferred to a new site near the PLDT Village Ulas, Talomo, Davao City in time for the school year of 2006–2007 to address the school's growing student population. On May 4, 2007, FSSLRI was granted authority to operate Grade VI level to complete its elementary department.

The institution went by a new name, San Lorenzo College of Davao which was approved by SEC on February 2, 2008.

School Year 2011 saw the Pre-school to Grade school being granted its Government Recognition No. 004 s.2011 & 2012, and the High School department being granted its Government Recognition No. 02, s.2012. On this year, the school was granted the ESC/EVS Certification for the High School and was granted 50 slots on its first year.

On May 1, 2015, the San Lorenzo College of Davao was donated to the Archdiocese of Davao, with the archdiocese taking over the school's administration and management.
