= St. Peter's College of Toril =

Roman Catholic college in Davao City, Philippines

Saint Peter's College of Toril
- Dalubhasaang San Pedro ng Toril
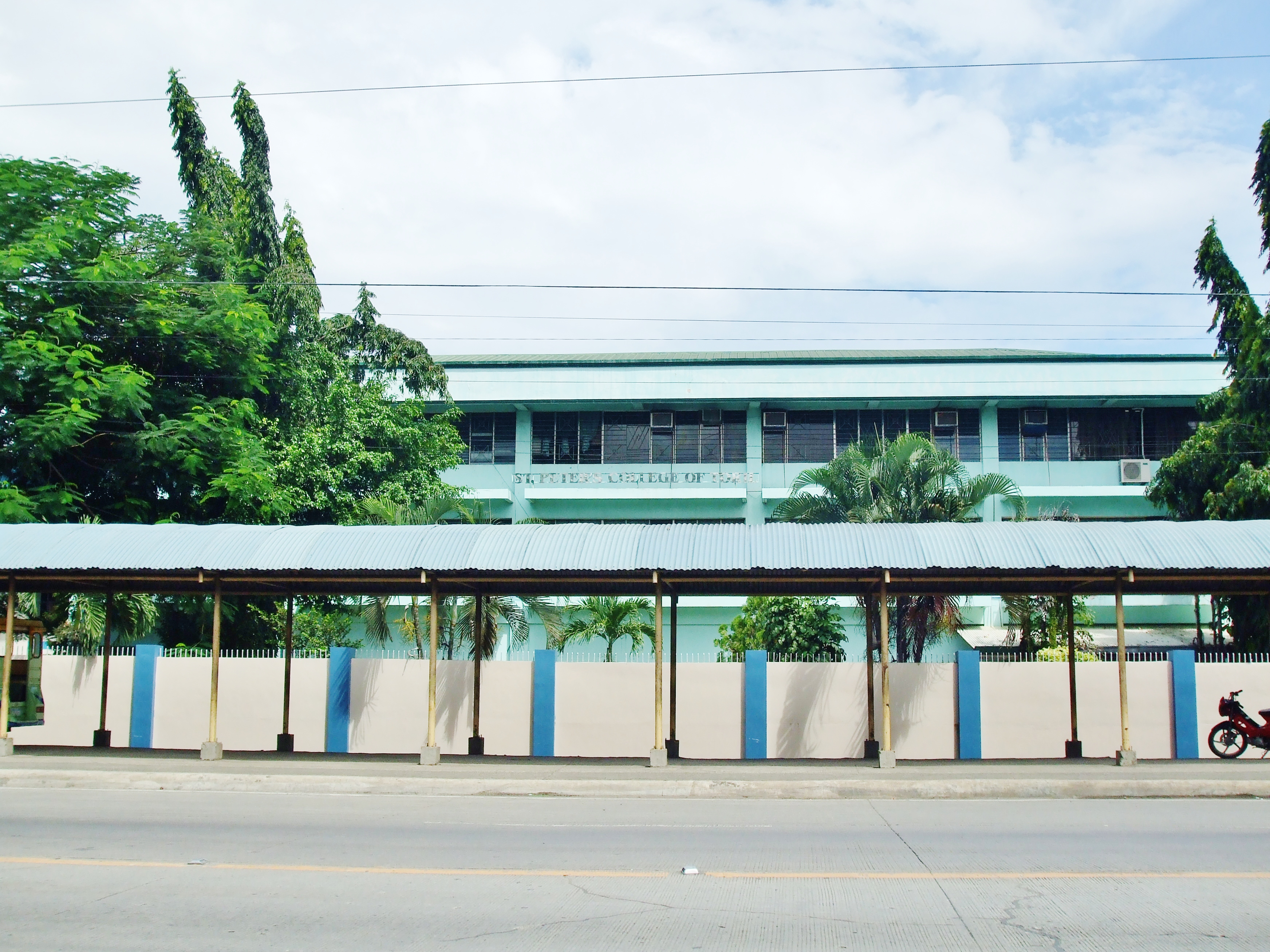
- SPCT Front Building
- Former names: Saint Peter's High School (1948-1953); Saint Peter's College of Daliaon (1953-1989)
- Motto: To Christ Through Mary.
- Type: Private Catholic School Coeducational Basic and Higher education institution
- Established: July 1, 1948; 78 years ago
- Religious affiliation: Roman Catholic (Sisters of the Presentation of Mary)
- Academic affiliations: CEAP PAASCU
- President: Stephanie T Gimena, PM, PhD
- Principal: Alfie P. Billion, MAEM (Grade School Principal); Jane P. Gohetia, MaEd (High School Principal)
- Dean: Dr. Katherine S. Rosales, Ph.D. (Dean of College)
- Location: McArthur Highway, Crossing Bayabas, Toril, Davao City, Davao del Sur, Philippines; 7°01′17″N 125°29′59″E
- Campus: Urban Toril, Davao City
- Publication: Petrean Voice
- Colors: Blue - Sky Blue - White
- Nickname: Petrean
- Website: http://spct.edu.ph/

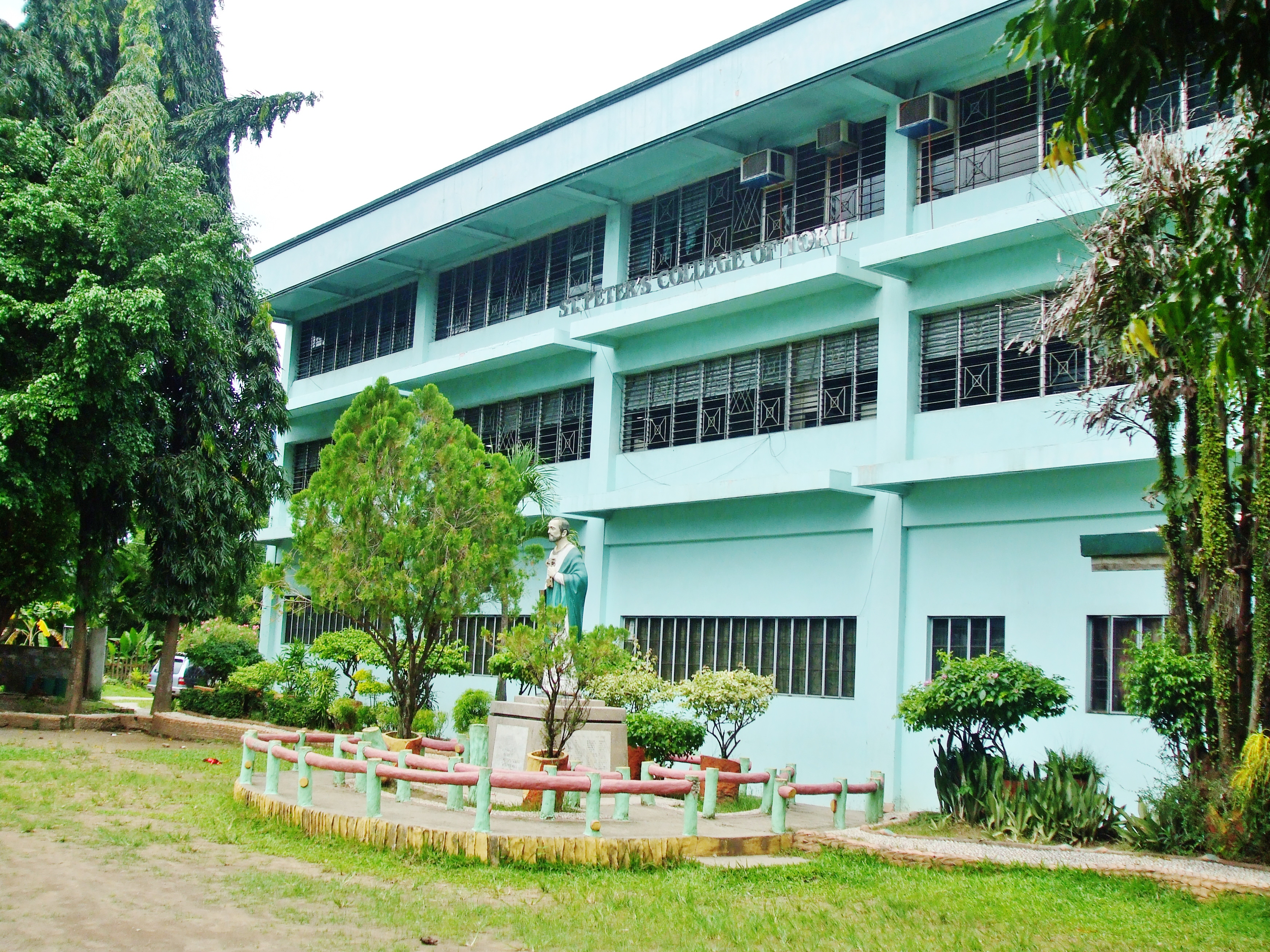
John Vianney Building

St. Peter's College of Toril also referred to by its acronym SPCT is a private, Catholic coeducational basic and higher education institution administered by the Sisters of the Presentation of Mary in Toril, Davao City. It was founded by the Society of Foreign Missions (P.M.E.) on July 1, 1948.

SPCT is a member of the Catholic Educational Association of the Philippines (CEAP), the largest association of Catholic schools in the country, with about 1,194 members as instituted in 1941.

== History ==
The history of the St. Peter's College of Toril dates back to July 1, 1948, when the Society of Foreign Missions (P.M.E.) (French: Société des Missions-Étrangères) opened a Catholic School named Saint Peter's High School. The school was a twin project of the Sto. Rosario Parish as the PME priests believe that a formal program of religious instruction to the youth of Toril was complementary to their task of evangelization. Father Jean Bernard Bazinet, P.M.E. was the first parish priest and the first school director. The first school enrollment consisted of first, second-, and third-year high school students. In 1950, the school produced its first high school graduates consisting of 32 students.

Realizing, a need for a more permanent management of the school, Msgr. Clovis Thibault, Bishop of Davao offered the administration of the school to the Sisters of the Presentation of Mary (PM). The offer was accepted in 1952 but the PM Sisters arrived in Toril only on May 25, 1953. Sr. Marie de Anges became the principal and at that point, the name of the school was changed to Saint Peter's College.

In 1963, the primary grades and the college department were opened. The courses offered were AB, BSE, and BSC. In 1977, a two-year Junior Secretarial course was offered but was discontinued in 1996. The following year, the intermediate grades were also opened. In 1978, preschool education or kindergarten was offered. In 2001, BEED was offered and in 2007 the BSBA course.

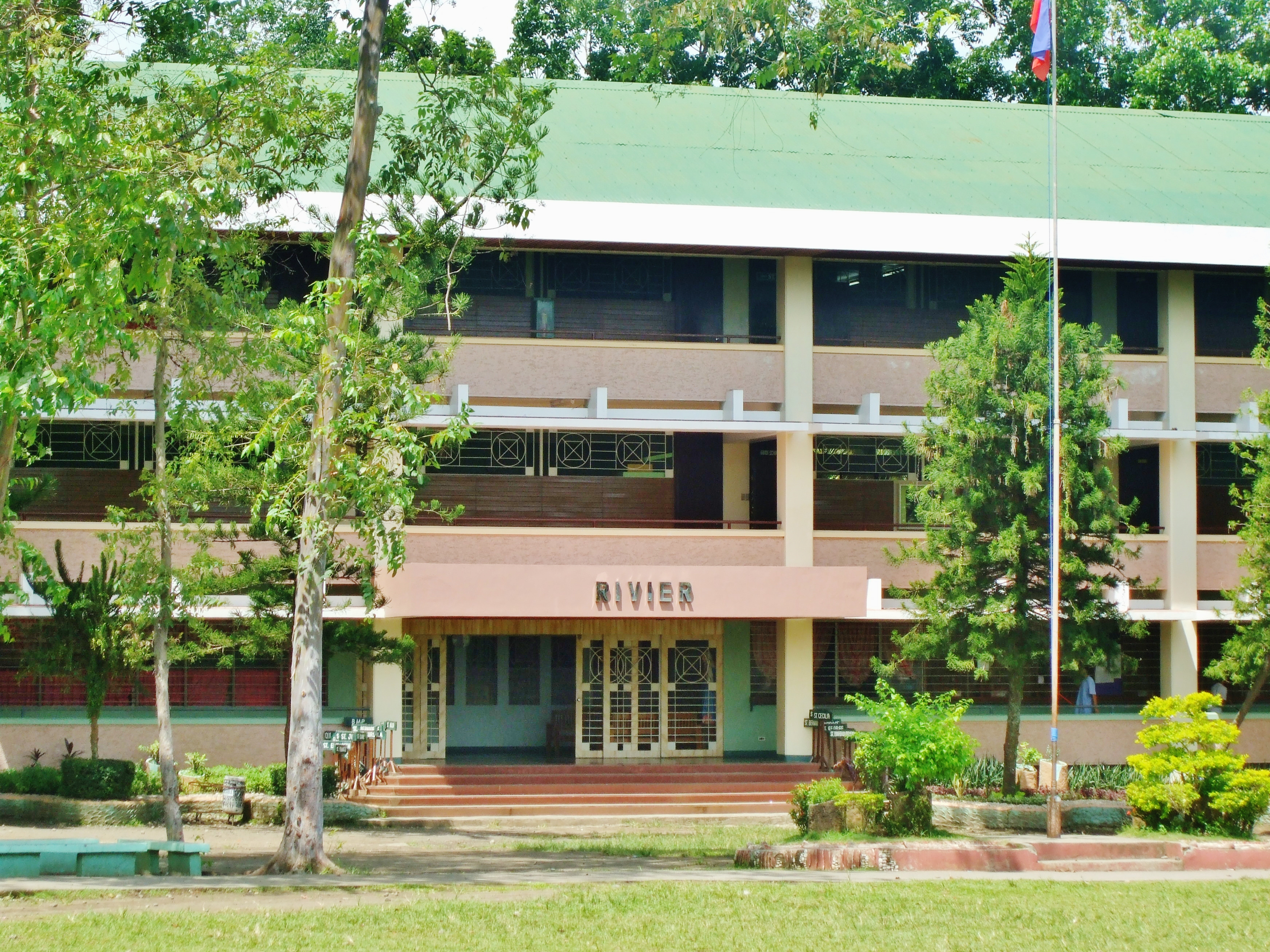
SPCT Rivier Building

At the very start, the school consisted only of a two-story building with eight rooms and gradually other buildings were constructed; significantly in 1986, the Rivier Building; in 1995, the science building was donated by the alumni; in 1998, the school gymnasium; in 2002-2003 the John Vianney Building and the Presentation de Marie Building in 2009.

On November 23, 1989, the name of the school was changed to Saint Peter's College of Toril (SPCT) and as the school administrators continued to explore ways to upgrade school standards, the grade school and high school applied for PAASCU (Philippine Accrediting Association of Schools Colleges and Universities) in 1990. Presently both departments, the elementary and high school are PAASCU Accredited-Level II.

== Location ==
St. Peter's College of Toril is situated at Mc Arthur Highway, Toril District, Davao City.
