= Notre Dame of Kalamansig =

Roman Catholic school in Sultan Kudarat, Philippines

Notre Dame of Kalamasig
- Type: Private, Catholic
- Established: 1948
- Founders: Father Aloysius Cartier, OMI
- Religious affiliation: Roman Catholic
- Principal: Mary Ann C. Bialen
- Director: Rev. Fr. Charlie D. Celeste, DCC, JCL, MAEM
- Location: Kalamansig, Sultan Kudarat, Philippines; 6°33′20″N 124°02′47″E
- Nickname: Notre Dameans

Notre Dame of Kalamasig is a private and Catholic educational institution in Kalamansig, Sultan Kudarat, Philippines. Established in 1948, it offers a secondary education program.
