= Saint Rita College (Manila) =

Roman Catholic college in Manila, Philippines

Saint Rita College - Manila
- Dalubhasaang Saint Rita - Maynila (Filipino)
- School seal
- Former names: Escuela de Santa Rita (1907‑1911); Colegio de Santa Rita (1911‑1921); St. Rita Academy (1921‑1945)
- Motto: One Mind and One Heart, Onwards to the Lord (Latin)
- Type: Private, Roman Catholic, Non-profit Coeducational Basic and Higher education institution
- Established: 1907; 119 years ago
- Founder: Congregation of the Augustinian Recollect Sisters
- Religious affiliation: Roman Catholic (Augustinian-Recollect Sisters)
- Academic affiliations: PAASCU
- Location: Plaza del Carmen, Quiapo, Manila, Philippines; 14°35′59″N 120°59′23″E
- Campus: Urban Quiapo, Manila
- Nickname: Ritarians
- Website: srcm.edu.ph
- Location in Manila Location in Metro Manila Location in Luzon Location in the Philippines

Saint Rita College is a private Catholic Augustinian-Recollect basic and higher education institution run by the Order of Augustinian Recollects sisters in the Philippines. It is situated in Plaza del Carmen, Quiapo, Manila, where the motherhouse of the Beaterio de Terciarias Agustinas Recoletas, now Congregation of the Augustinian Recollect Sisters, is located. It was founded in 1907 as "Escuela de Santa Rita", the first school of the Augustinian-Recollect Sisters which offered free education to kindergarten girls, and special courses such as Spanish, Music, Painting and Embroidery.

At present, it offers education from elementary through college. Academic programs are based on the Learning Standards of the Augustinian Recollect (LSAR) and the DepEd K-12 Curriculum. Courses offered in college include Bachelor in Elementary Education (BEED) and Bachelor in Secondary Education (BSED) major in English; and Bachelor of Arts major in English.

== History ==
In 1907, the Recollect priest, Reverend Father Celestino Yolde, prescribed a well-defined and delineated program of education on reading, writing, Spanish language, religion, music, painting, and embroidery with Spanish as the medium of instruction, where classes were informally given by the Augustinian-Recollect Sisters. The next year, the school building was built and formal classes started with the approval of the Bureau of Private Schools.

In 1911, the school was registered as "Colegio de Santa Rita", which offered Primary and Intermediate classes. English was included in the program of instruction and became the medium of teaching the following year. By the year 1921, the school adopted a new name, "St. Rita Academy", and then renamed as "Saint Rita College" in 1945.

In 1948, College programs as well as vocational courses were offered. The school opened its doors to young boys by the year 2003.

Saint Rita College celebrated its centennial year in 2007 with the theme "Love to Come Home."

== Gallery ==
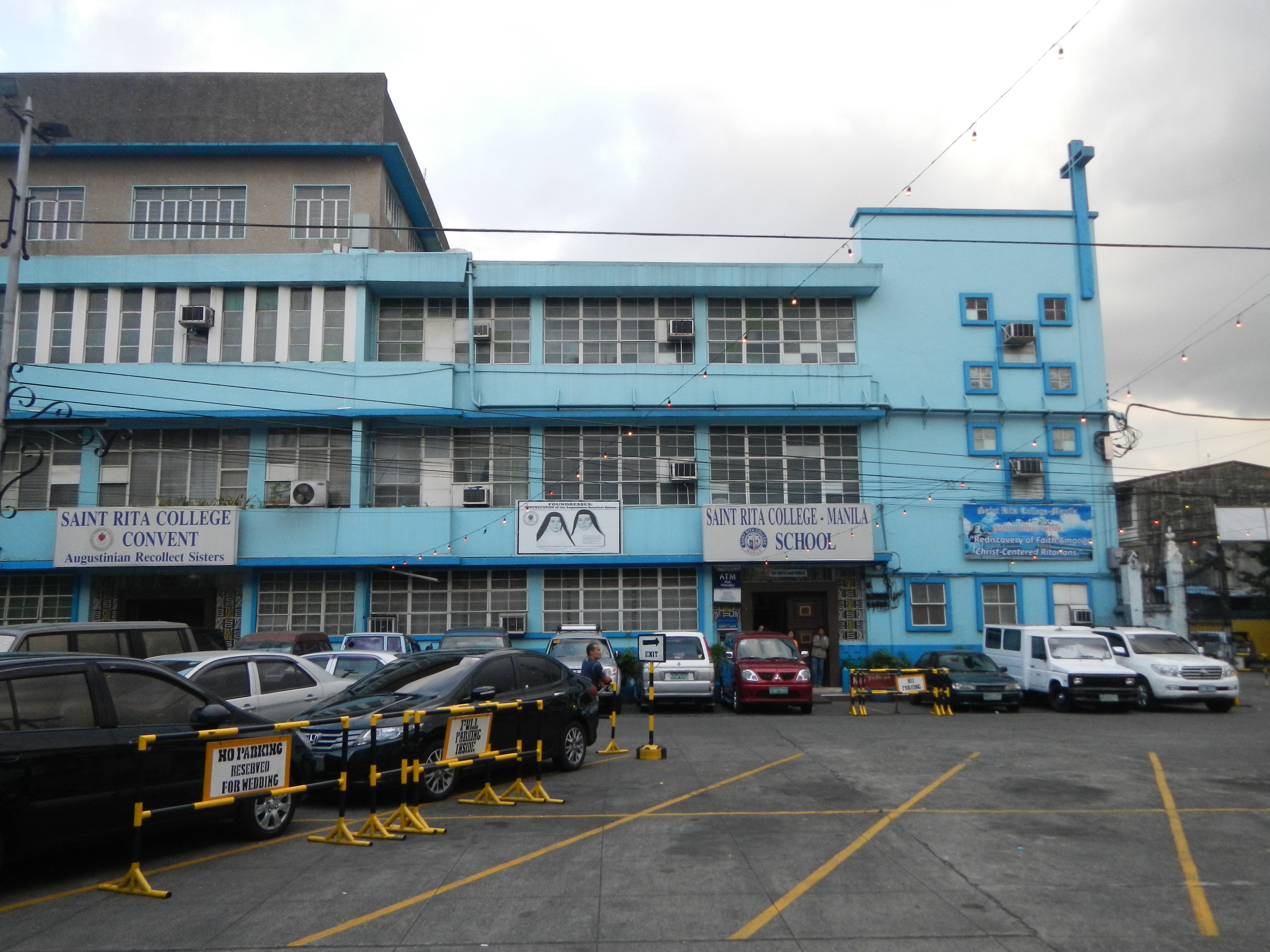
Facade

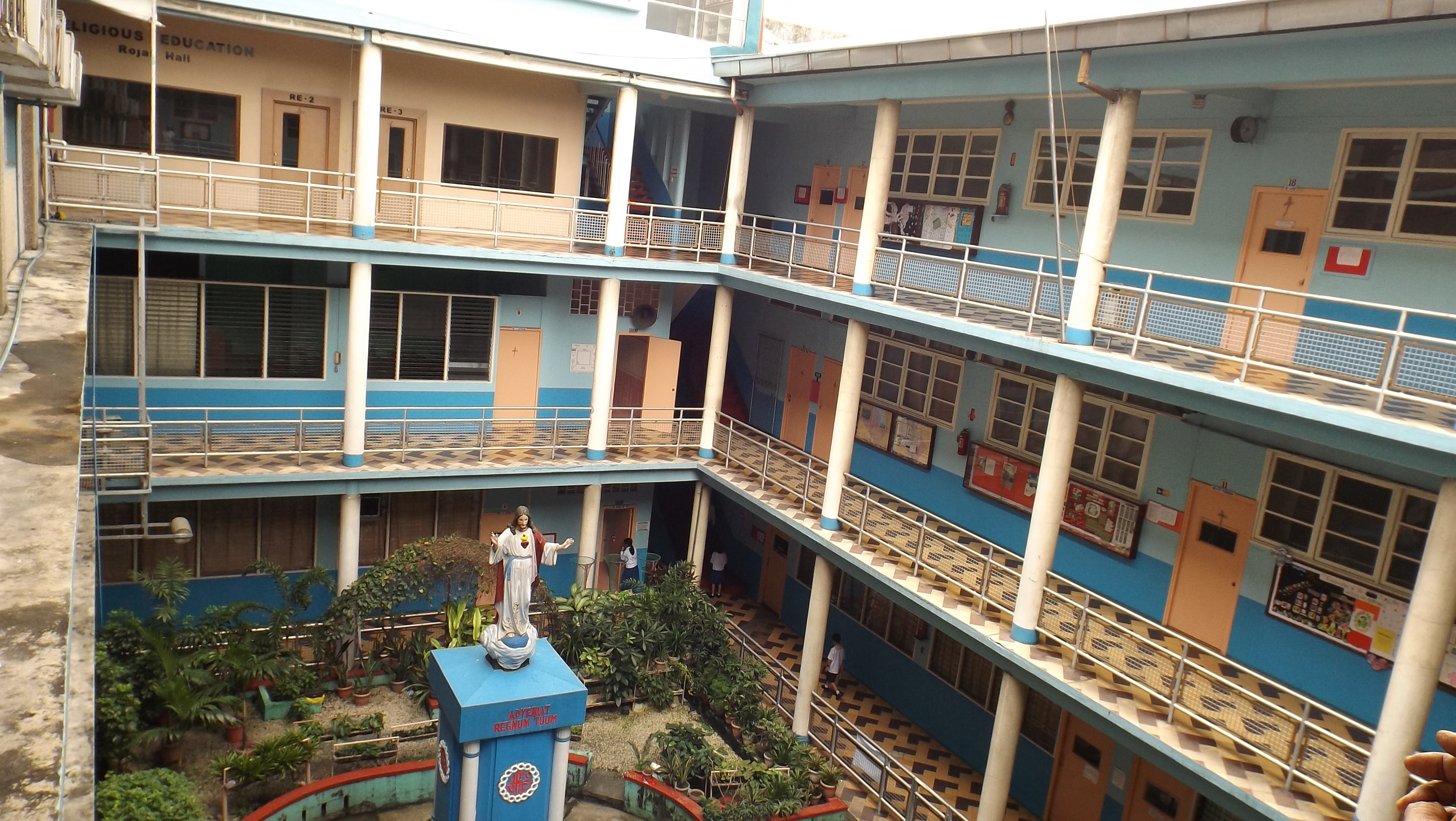
Inside St. Rita College

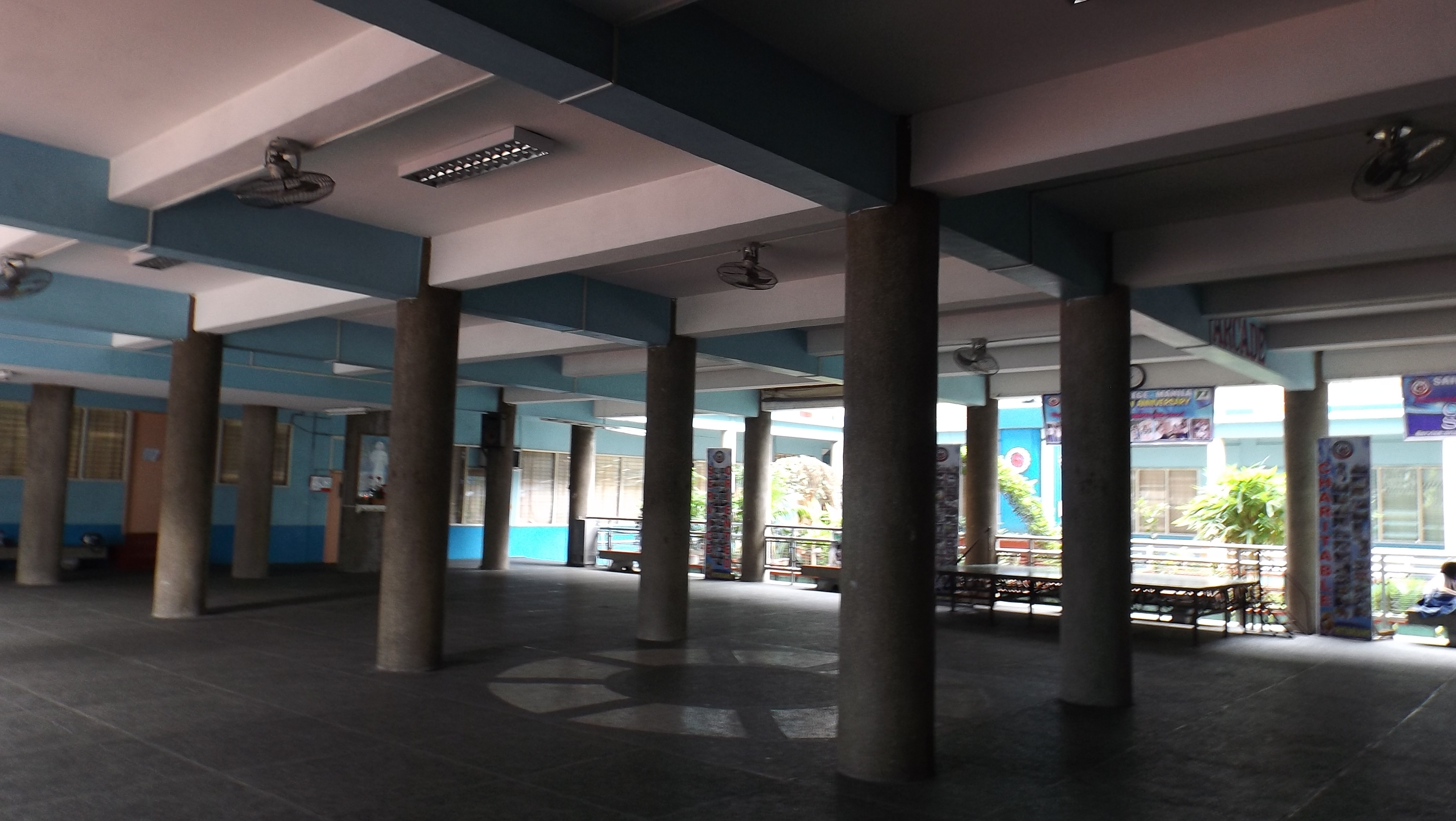
Original site of the Beaterio, now part of the lobby area inside Saint Rita College - Manila

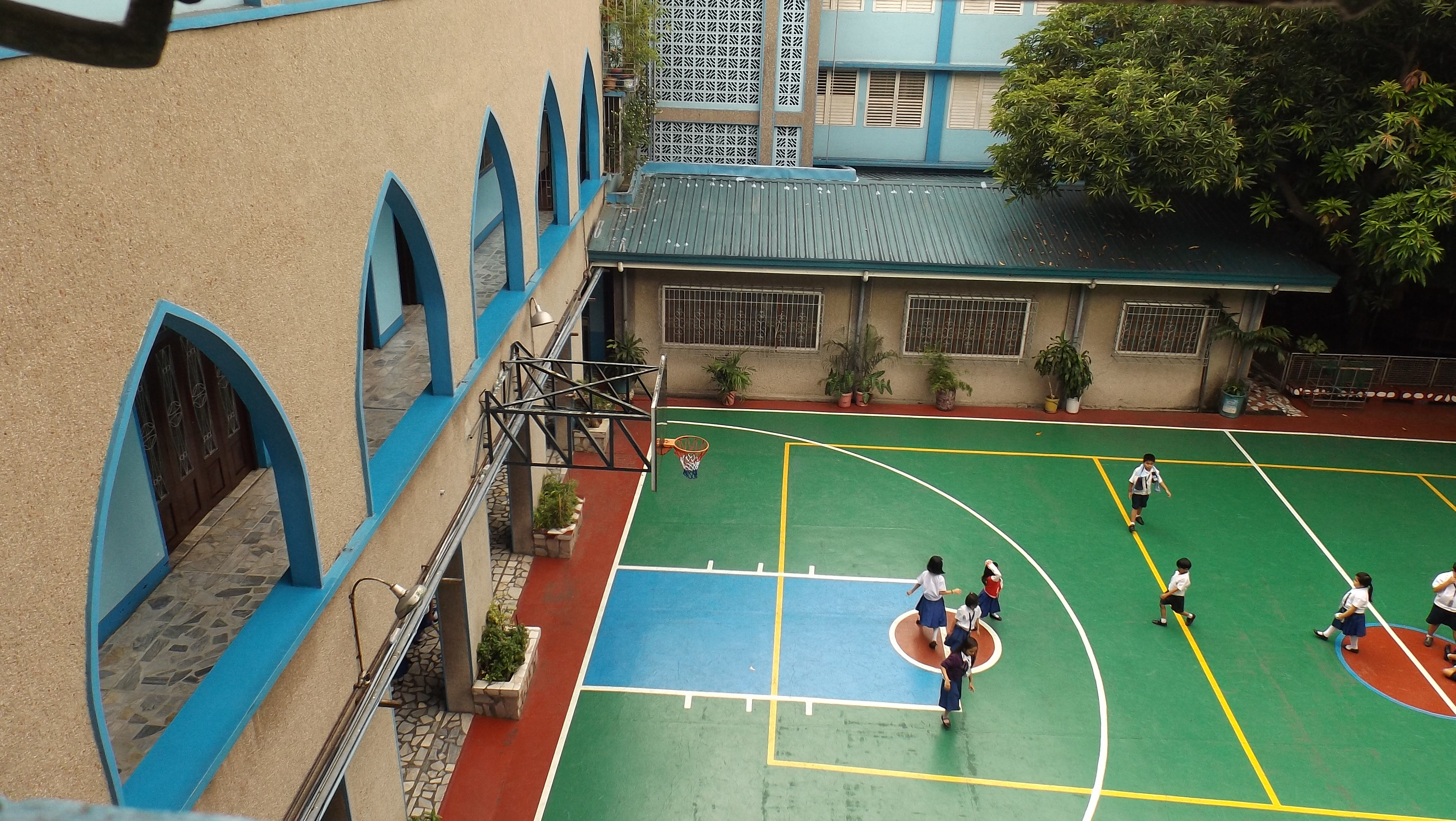
Gothic windows

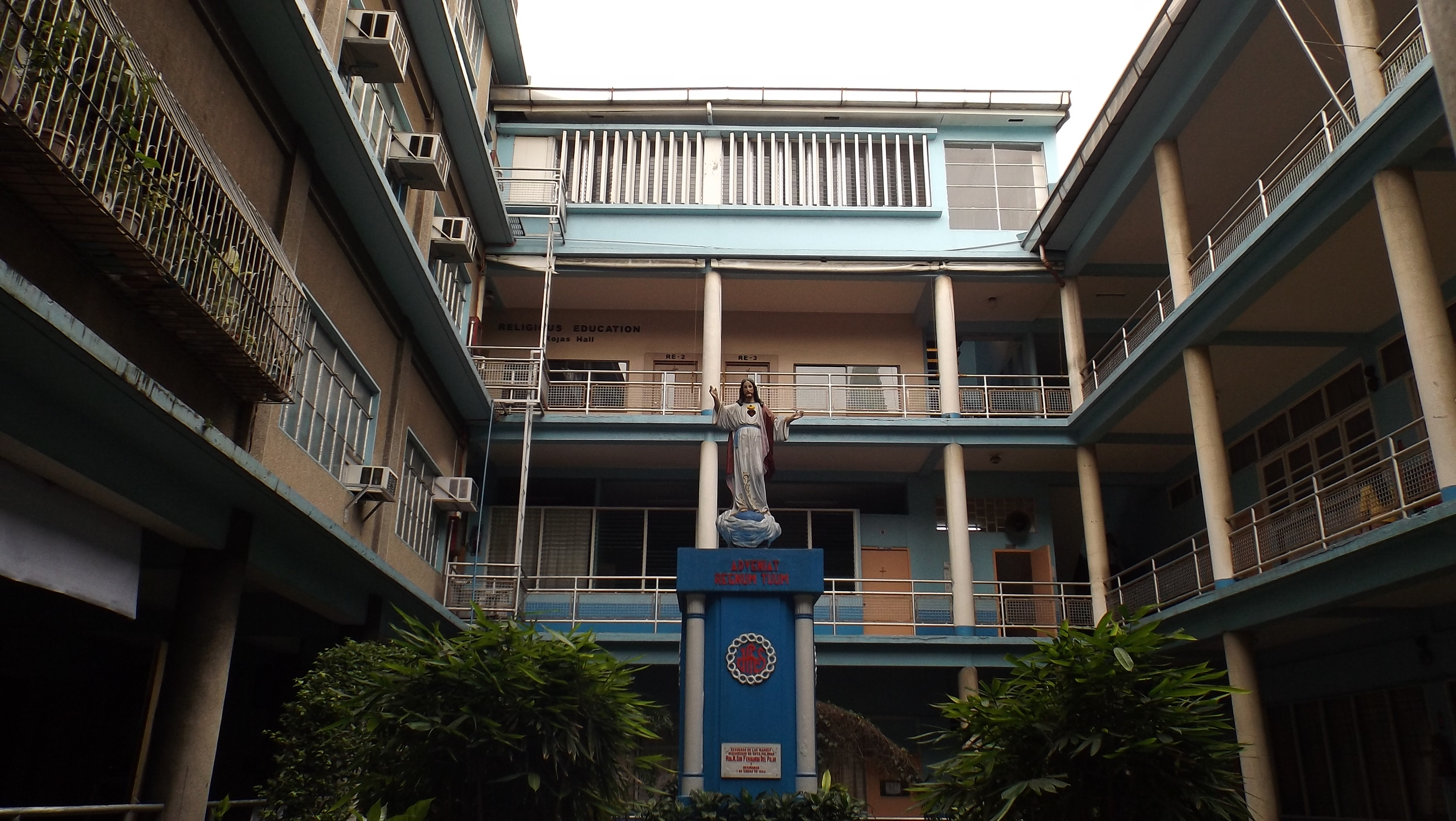
Sacred Heart Garden, where the sisters found "solace in contemplation"

== See also ==
- Saint Rita of Cascia
