= Missionaries of the Assumption =

Roman Catholic congregation of women

The Missionaries of the Assumption is a religious congregation of women. It is actually a spin-off from the Daughters of Mary of the Assumption, which was founded April 1, 1989 by Archbishop Louis Joseph Arthur Melanson in Campbellton, New Brunswick, Canada. The new community started with twenty-nine Sisters from the Daughters of Mary of the Assumption whose main apostolate is education. Upon their arrival in Davao City, the FMA Sisters, as they are popularly called, established schools in many parts of the then Davao Province, presently composed of Davao del Norte, Davao del Sur, Davao Oriental and Davao de Oro.

The sisters exposure to the harsh realities of the people they serve, many members of the FMA were challenged to discover a new meaning and insight with their charism. These sisters have an increasing desire to respond actively and creatively to the current conditions and needs of the People of God. Thus, they were driven to redefine their presence to the communities refounding an entirely new character to the congregation.

Their charism articulated their main apostolate: "We the Missionaries of the Assumption, are called to witness to the incarnate Christ's option for the poor, through active participation in the Church's works of evangelization. In fidelity to the Church and inspired by Mary's Assumption, we live this out with hope and joy."

The twenty-nine sisters became the founding group together with the late Archbishop Antonio LI. Mabutas of the Archdiocese of Davao as canonical founder.

The Missionaries of the Assumption chose their initial as m.a. and have opted to become a Society of Apostolic Life in the Roman Catholic Church. Their constitution stresses that the sisters should be discerning and participative in the apostolic activities that bring them into solidarity with the poor in their struggle for justice, full life and total human liberation, and to participate in the missionary works that bring about the restoration of harmony and balance in the life systems of the Mother Earth.

Today the m.a. sisters are engaged in the following ministries and apostolates: Indigenous Peoples, Health, Women and Children, Parish Work, School and conducting retreats, seminars and Growth Sessions.

The sisters are present at the following ecclesiastical areas: Archdiocese of Davao, Diocese of Butuan, Prelature of Marawi, Diocese of Antipolo, and the Archdiocese of Honiara in the Solomon Islands.
