= Don Bosco High School, Lagawe =

Roman Catholic school in Ifugao, Philippines

Don Bosco High School

Location
- Poblacion South; Lagawe, Ifugao; Philippines
- Coordinates: 16°47′46″N 121°07′25″E

Information
- Established: 1946; 80 years ago
- Founder: Fr. Gerard de Boeck, CICM

Don Bosco High School (DBHS) is a private Catholic basic education institution located at Poblacion South, Lagawe, Ifugao, Philippines. This school caters to all students from Lagawe and the nearby towns and provinces. DBHS was established in 1949 by Fr. Gerard de Boeck.

== History ==
The founder, Fr. Gerard de Boeck, CICM, arrived in Lagawe in 1946. He established the school as a Missionary institution.

In 1946, there was only one elementary school in the municipality, thus, the pupils had to come down to Lagawe when they were in Grades Five and Six. In 1947, Fr. De Boeck put up dormitories for the learners. Later in 1949, one half of the High School building was already constructed. Immediately, the school began its operation with 49 students. Fr. Gerard de Boeck and Fr. Hubert DuPont were named as the School Head and Principal, respectively. Bishop William Brasseur named the institution Don Bosco High School.

The next year, the second half of the building was constructed. The population gradually rose to 91 in 1950, and to 268 in the next three years. Of the 49 pioneer students, only 29 graduated in 1953, with Fr. Lambert Smiths as principal.

In 1953, ICM Sisters came to Lagawe and started working in partnership with the CICM priests. Mother Marie Eleuthere became the first nun principal of the school. For 20 years, thereafter, the principal's post was held by the ICM sisters.

Other structures were also built including the Boys' Dormitory, and an annex of the Girls' Dormitory. An auditorium was also constructed with five 1st year rooms below it.

The bishop approved the idea of opening a college in Lagawe. Then, as expected, in 1968, DBHS opened its doors as Saint Louis College.

In 1977, however, the local college was closed and the name of the school was Saint Louis High School. With more than enough facilities and enough rooms for all year levels, construction has stopped some time since. The founder was transferred to Virac, Itogon, in 1969.

In the early 1970s, under the initiative and encouragement of Sister Modesta Suico, teachers and students visited the barrios at weekends to evangelize and to explain political issues. One such barrio visit was in Abinuan, one of the most remote barrios in Lagawe, led by the sister principal. When they came home on September 3, 1972, the group learned that the country was placed under martial law.

When there was an issue of charter change and a constitutional convention, the students and teachers went to the barrios to explain the pros and cons of the matter.

The 1990 Luzon earthquake prompted Fr. Lino Fagyan, the acting parish priest and School Head, to initiate the putting up of a makeshift building, intended to house the classes from the main building which was unsafe due to major cracks on its walls. The parents and students had worked on it voluntarily, and cash gifts had been received from donors. Meanwhile, the third and fourth year sections had to borrow rooms from the nearby elementary school for almost 2 months. Finally, the DBHS main building was renovated and judged safe for occupancy.

== Present day ==
Today the makeshift building has become a multipurpose building which houses some of other departments like the kindergarten, a first year room and a third year room.

A library is also contained in the main building which won an award for being active and productive. It also produces its own newspaper, at first called the "Valley Echo". This started in 1983. Its first editor was Ms. Carol Pumihic. Later it was named "Kataguan" until 1991, when the staff, under the advice of Mr. Gregorio Kimayong, changed it to "Free Voice". "Free Voice" staff have joined in press conferences where a number of them got awards. The paper itself has gained two awards, one during the regional press conference in Tabuk, Kalinga, and the other in the 1990 Regional Secondary Schools Press Conference (R.S.S.P.C.) The promotion of the Solid Waste Management program on school year 2008-2009 by student officers made the school famous. This program invited other schools to learn about this program. After the school's re-certification in school year 2008-2009, the school was said to be high standard (academically). This result made the principal abolish some traditional occasions of the school which disappointed all of the students. This caused a silent commotion among the students!! The loyalty of all the students to the principal decreased even if the school achieved many promotions. Even if the students wanted to revolt, they couldn't because of such great risks such as expulsion. with the new principal, some school activities which students like most were abolished.

== Sources and external links ==
- Don Bosco High School, Lagawe: website
