= Oblates of Notre Dame =

Oblates of Notre-Dame
- Oblates of Notre-Dame
- Abbreviation: O.N.D.
- Formation: 1956 Cotabato City (Philippines)
- Founder: Fr. George Dion, OMI; Fr. Gerard Mongeau, OMI
- Type: Religious congregation (Institute of Consecrated Life)
- Purpose: Catechesis and social ministries (Hesed Foundation, Reconciliation Center, health care, and ministry to migrants, itinerant people, and women, along with Mission Exchange in Papua New Guinea, Texas, USA and Okinawa, Japan)
- Headquarters: Generalate #141 Sinsuat Ave., Rosary Heights, P.O. Box 667, 9600 Cotabato City, Philippines
- Members: 172 (2011)
- Superior General: Sr. Erlinda Candelario Hisug, OND (2017-2021)
- Parent organization: Oblates of Mary Immaculate Philippine Province
- Website: oblatesisters.webs.com

The Oblates of Notre Dame (OND) is a Roman catholic religious congregation based in Cotabato City, Philippines. The congregation consists of 172 religious sisters as of January 2016.. They are known for their interfaith programs in Mindanao which caters to both Christians and Muslims.

It was founded on November 10, 1956, in Cotabato City by two missionaries of the Oblates of Mary Immaculate who came to Manila in 1939: Fathers George Dion and Gerard Mongeau. The First Members were: Sr. Ma. Estrella Adre, OND, and Sr. Rosita Quijano, OND

Their primary apostolate is pastoral catechesis. Many sisters are working as parish sisters and help in diocesan offices in various local parish churches. They own and administer schools or help in other institutions as administrators, deans of women or campus ministers especially among Notre Dame schools in the Philippines and church-owned institutions.

The OND first established presence in Papua New Guinea in 1982.

The OND Sisters are also engaged in a numerous variety of social ministries, and work in conjunction with the OND Hesed Foundation.
