= List of the oldest schools in the Philippines =

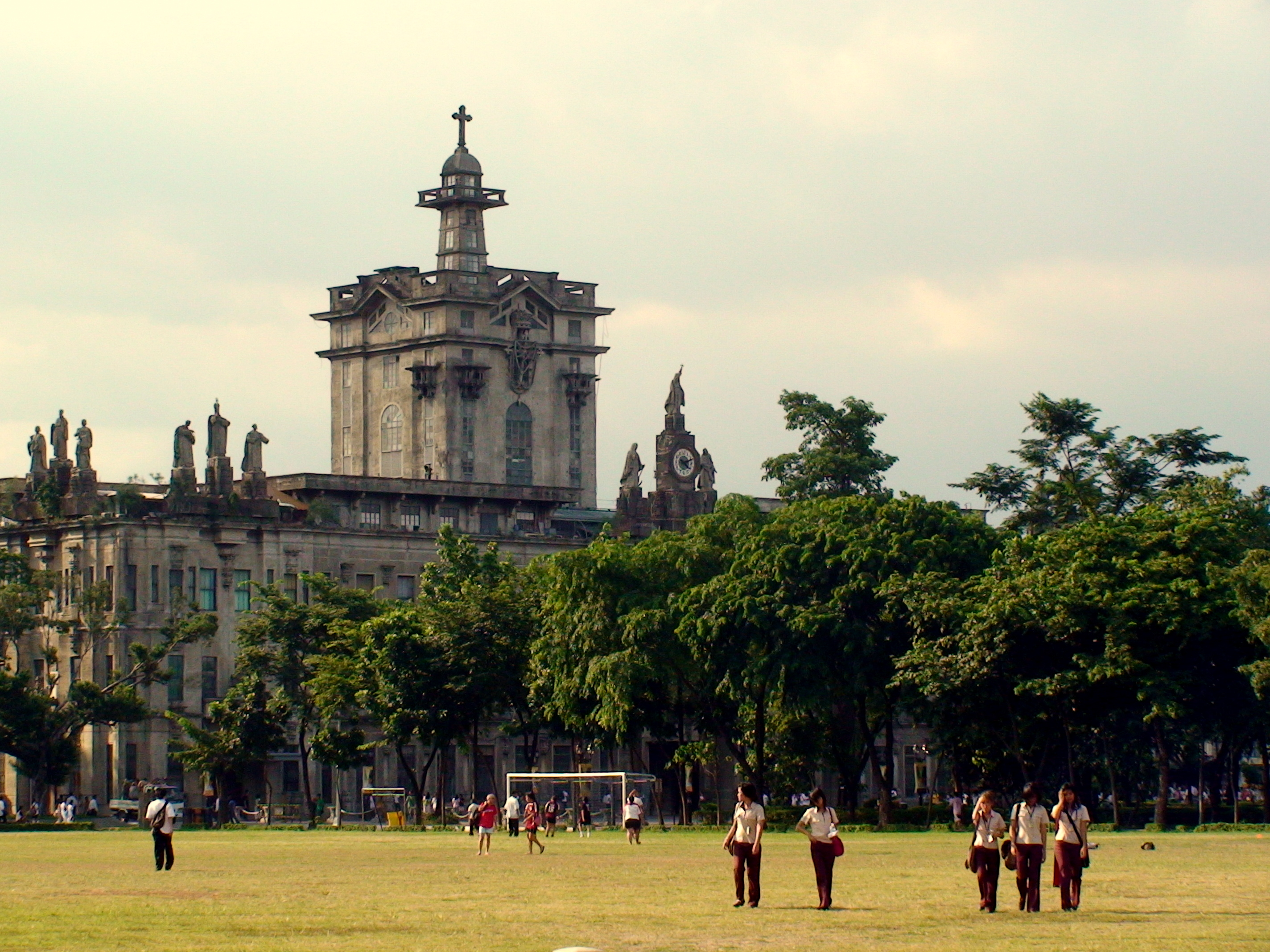
The Royal and Pontifical University of Santo Tomas, established by the Dominican missionaries in 1611 and raised to the rank of a university in 1645 by Pope Innocent X through the petition of Philip IV of Spain, is currently the educational institution with the oldest extant university charter in Asia.

This is a list of educational institutions in the Philippines arranged according to the dates of their foundation. It comprises the list of the oldest schools in the Philippines sorted in various categories, and gives an overview of the development of education and higher learning in the Philippines. To be included in this list, an institution must satisfy a traditional definition of a formal educational institution at the time of its founding.

The oldest universities, colleges, vocational schools and the first modern public education system in Asia were created during the Spanish colonial period. The earliest schools were founded by Spanish Catholic missionaries. By the time Spain was replaced by the United States as the colonial power, Filipinos were among the most educated subjects in all of Asia.

== Dispute over the oldest school ==
The title of the oldest in the Philippines have been topic for debate between two educational institutions: the University of Santo Tomas and the University of San Carlos.

The University of Santo Tomas, established in 1611 as the Colegio de Nuestra Señora del Santisimo Rosario, is the oldest university in the Philippines. In 1935 the Commonwealth government of the Philippines through the Historical Research and Markers Committee declared that UST was "oldest university under the American flag." In the 1990s, the Intramuros Administration installed a marker on the original site of the University of Santo Tomas with the recognition that the university is the "oldest university in Asia." In 2011 Pope Benedict XVI recognized UST as "the oldest institution of Catholic higher education in the Far East," while in 2012 the National Historical Commission of the Philippines published an online article recognizing UST as Asia's oldest university.

However, University of San Carlos has opposed this recognition and claims that it is older than the University of Santo Tomas by 16 years by tracing its roots to the Colegio de San Ildefonso (established 1595). In 1995, University of San Carlos celebrated its Quadricentennial (400th Anniversary).

== UST as Asia's oldest university ==
Numerous scholars and official government bodies have reviewed the case. In 2010, the National Historical Commission of the Philippines installed a bronze marker declaring USC's foundation late in the 18th century, effectively disproving any direct connection with the Colegio de San Ildefonso. According to Dr. Victor Torres of the De La Salle University, the University of San Carlos' claim only dates back to 1948, when USC was declared a university. Fidel Villarroel from the University of Santo Tomas argued that USC only took over the facility of the former Colegio de San Ildefonso and that there is no 'visible' and 'clear' link between San Carlos and San Ildefonso. Aloysius Cartagenas (a Cebuano), in a paper published by Philippiniana Sacra, stated that the correct foundation year of USC is 1867, and not 1595, while in 2012 the National Historical Commission of the Philippines cemented its previous position when it published an online article recognizing UST as Asia's oldest university.

== Oldest educational institutions ==
Current name/ Latest name before extinction	Year founded	Name at time of foundation	Founding order	Location upon foundation/ Last location if extinct	Current status	Current/last affiliations	Type	Ref
Colegio de Santa Potenciana	1589	Colegio de Santa Potenciana	Franciscan Order	Intramuros, Manila	Defunct		Private	
Universidad de San Ignacio	1590	Colegio de Manila	Society of Jesus	Intramuros, Manila	Defunct	Society of Jesus	Seminary, Pontifical, royal, private	
Colegio de San Ildefonso	1595	Colegio de San Ildefonso	Society of Jesus	Cebu City	Defunct	Society of Jesus	Private	
Colegio y Seminario de San José	1601	Colegio de San Jose	Society of Jesus	Intramuros, Manila	Active	Society of Jesus	Private	
Real y Pontificia Universidad de Santo Tomás de Aquino (University of Santo Tomas, Manila)	1611	Colegio de Nuestra Señora de Santisimo Rosario	Dominican Order	Intramuros, Manila	Active	Dominican Order	Private, pontifical, royal	
Colegio de San Juan de Letran	1620	Colegio de Niños Huerfanos de San Juan de Letran	Don Juan Geronimo Guerrero	Intramuros, Manila	Active	Dominican Order	Private	
Colegio de Huérfanos de Santos Pedro y Pablo	1620	Colegio de Huérfanos de Santos Pedro y Pablo	Dominican Order	Intramuros, Manila	Defunct		Private	
Colegio de San Juan de Letran	1620	Colegio de San Juan de Letran	Dominican Order	Intramuros, Manila	Active	Dominican Order	Private	
Real Colegio de Santa Isabel (Santa Isabel College, Manila)	1632	Real Colegio de Santa Isabel		Intramuros, Manila	Active	Daughters of Charity of Saint Vincent de Paul	Private	
Universidad de San Felipe de Austria	1640	Universidad de San Felipe de Austria	Audiencia Real de Manila	Intramuros, Manila	Defunct		Public	

== Oldest educational institutions in continuous operation ==
Current name	Traces origin to	Year founded	Founding order	Location upon foundation	Type	Current affiliations	Ref
Colegio y Seminario de San José	Colegio de San Jose	1601	Society of Jesus	Intramuros, Manila	Private	Jesuit	
Real y Pontificia Universidad de Santo Tomás de Aquino (University of Santo Tomás, Manila)	Colegio de Nuestra Señora del Santísimo Rosario	1611	Dominican Order	Intramuros, Manila	Private, pontifical, royal	Dominican Order	
Colegio de San Juan de Letran	Colegio de San Juan de Letran	1620	Dominican Order	Intramuros, Manila	Private	Dominican Order	
Real Colegio de Santa Isabel (Santa Isabel College, Manila)	Real Colegio de Santa Isabel	1632		Intramuros, Manila	Private, Royal	Daughters of Charity	
San Carlos Seminary	Real y Conciliar Colegio de San Carlos	1702	Archdiocese of Manila	Intramuros, Manila	Seminary	Archdiocese of Manila	
Santa Catalina College	Beaterio Colegio de Santa Catalina de Siena	1706	Dominican Order	Intramuros, Manila	Private	Dominican Order	
St. Mary's College	Colegio del Beaterio	1725	Religious of the Virgin Mary	Intramuros, Manila	Private	Religious of the Virgin Mary	
Colegio de Santa Rosa	Beaterio y Casa de Enseñanza	1750		Intramuros, Manila	Private	Daughters of Charity	
Seminario Mayor de San Carlos	Real Seminario de San Carlos	1783	Archdiocese of Cebu	Cebu City	Seminary	Society of the Divine Word	
Holy Rosary Minor Seminary	Casa de Clerigos	1793	Archdiocese of Caceres	Naga City	Seminary	Archdiocese of Caceres	
Immaculate Conception School of Theology, Vigan	Seminario de San Pablo	1822	Dominican Order	Vigan	Seminary	Archdiocese of Nueva Segovia	
Ateneo de Manila University	Escuela Municipal de Manila	1859	Society of Jesus	Intramuros, Manila	Private	Jesuit	
Saint Vincent Ferrer Seminary	Seminario-Colegio de San Vicente Ferrer	1869	Archdiocese of Jaro	Jaro, Iloilo City	Seminary	Archdiocese of Jaro	

== Oldest educational institutions for girls ==
Still in operation Defunct Established as a school for girls

Current name	Year founded	Name at time of foundation	Founding order	Location upon foundation	Type	Current affiliations	Ref
Colegio de Santa Potenciana	1589	Colegio de Santa Potenciana	Franciscan Order	Intramuros, Manila	Private		
Santa Isabel College Manila	1632	Real Colegio de Santa Isabel		Intramuros, Manila	Private	Daughters of Charity of St. Vincent de Paul	
Santa Catalina College	1706	Beaterio Colegio de Santa Catalina de Siena	Dominican Order	Intramuros, Manila	Private	Dominican Order	
St. Mary's College	1725	Colegio del Beaterio	Religious of the Virgin Mary	Intramuros, Manila	Private	Religious of the Virgin Mary	
Colegio de Santa Rosa	1750	Beaterio y Casa de Enseñanza		Intramuros, Manila	Private	Daughters of Charity	
Universidad de Sta. Isabel	1867	Colegio de Santa Isabel	Daughters of Charity	Naga City	Private	Daughters of Charity	
Concordia College	1868	Colegio de la Inmaculada Concepcion de la Concordia	Daughters of Charity	Manila	Private	Daughters of Charity	
Colegio de la Inmaculada Concepcion	1880	Colegio de la Inmaculada Concepcion	Hermanitas de la Madre de Dios	Cebu City	Private	Daughters of Charity	
La Consolacion College Manila	1902	Colegio de Nuestra Señora de la Consolacion	Order of Saint Augustine	Mendiola, Manila	Private, Roman Catholic, coeducational	Order of Saint Augustine	
Assumption College San Lorenzo	1904	Assumption Convent	Religious of the Assumption	Manila	Private	Religious of the Assumption	
St. Scholastica's College Manila	1906	St. Scholastica's College Manila	Order of Saint Benedict	Manila	Private	Order of Saint Benedict	
St. Paul University Manila	1912	St. Paul University Manila	Sisters of St. Paul of Chartres	Manila	Private	Sisters of St. Paul of Chartres	
Centro Escolar University (Note: Centro Escolar University was established as Centro Escolar de Señoritas by Doña Librada Avelino and Doña Carmen de Luna in 1907 to cater the young women of Manila. The university is still continuously operating, but now as a co-educational institution.)	1907	Centro Escolar de Señoritas		Manila	Private, non-sectarian		

== Oldest public educational institutions ==
Still in operation Defunct

Current name	Year founded	Name at time of foundation	Location upon foundation	Ref
Universidad de San Felipe de Austria	1640	Universidad de San Felipe de Austria	Intramuros, Manila	
Philippine Merchant Marine Academy	1820	Escuela Nautica de Manila	Intramuros, Manila	
Pampanga State University	1861	Escuela De Artes y Oficios De Bacolor	Bacolor, Pampanga	
Baguio Central School	1899		Baguio	
Baluarte Elementary School	1905		Molo, Iloilo City	

== Educational institutions with the oldest university charters ==
Still in operation Defunct

Name	Year of university charter	Charter granted by	Location upon foundation	Type	Ref
Universidad de San Ignacio	1621	Philip IV of Spain	Manila	Private	
Universidad de San Felipe de Austria	1640	Real Audiencia de Manila	Intramuros, Manila	Public	
University of Santo Tomas	1645	Pope Innocent X, Philip IV of Spain	Manila	Private	
Universidad Literaria de Filipinas	1898	Philippine Revolutionary government	Intramuros, Manila	Public	
University of the Philippines Manila	1908	American Civil government	Manila	Public	
University of the Philippines Los Baños	1909	American Civil government	Los Baños, Laguna	Public	
University of the Philippines Visayas	1918	American Civil government	Miagao, Iloilo	Public	
Centro Escolar University	1932	Philippine Commonwealth government	Manila	Private	
Far Eastern University	1933	Philippine Commonwealth government	Manila	Private	
Silliman University	1938	Philippine Commonwealth government	Dumaguete	Private	
Adamson University	1941	Philippine Commonwealth government	Manila	Private	
University of the Philippines Diliman	1949	Philippine government	Quezon City	Public	
University of San Agustin	1953	Philippine government	Iloilo City	Private	
Saint Louis University	1963	Philippine government	Baguio City	Private	

== Oldest seminaries ==
Still in operation Defunct

Current name	Year founded	Name at time of foundation	Founding order	Location upon foundation	Current affiliations	Refs
Universidad de San Ignacio	1590	Colegio de Manila	Society of Jesus	Manila		
San José Seminary	1601	Colegio de San José	Society of Jesus	Intramuros, Manila	Jesuit	
University of Santo Tomas Central Seminary	1611	Colegio de Nuestra Señora de Santisimo Rosario	Dominican Order	Intramuros, Manila	Dominican Order	
San Carlos Seminary	1702	Real y Conciliar Colegio de San Carlos	Archdiocese of Manila	Intramuros, Manila	Archdiocese of Manila	
Seminario Mayor de San Carlos	1783	Real Seminario de San Carlos	Archdiocese of Cebu	Cebu City	Society of the Divine Word	
Holy Rosary Minor Seminary	1793	Casa de Clerigos	Archdiocese of Caceres	Naga City	Archdiocese of Caceres	
Immaculate Conception School of Theology, Vigan	1822	Seminario de San Pablo	Dominican Order	Vigan	Archdiocese of Nueva Segovia	
Saint Vincent Ferrer Seminary	1869	Seminario-Colegio de San Vicente Ferrer	Archdiocese of Jaro	Jaro, Iloilo City	Archdiocese of Jaro	

== Oldest law schools ==
Still in operation Defunct

Name	Year founded	Educational institution	Location upon foundation	Ref
University of Santo Tomas Faculty of Civil Law	1734	University of Santo Tomas	Intramuros, Manila	
Universidad de San Ignacio Facultad de Derecho Civil	1734	Universidad de San Ignacio	Intramuros, Manila	
Universidad Literaria de Filipinas Civil Law	1898	Universidad Literaria de Filipinas	Manila	
Manila Law College	1899	Manila Law College	Manila	
University of the Philippines College of Law	1911	University of the Philippines	Manila	
University of Manila College of Law	1913	University of Manila	Manila	
Philippine Law School	1915	Philippine Law School	Manila	
University of Manila College of Law	1918	University of Manila	Manila	
Far Eastern University Institute of Law	1934	Far Eastern University	Manila	
Silliman University College of Law	1935	Silliman University	Dumaguete	
Ateneo Law School	1936	Ateneo de Manila University	Quezon City	
University of San Carlos School of Law and Governance	1937	University of San Carlos	Cebu City	
Arellano University School of Law	1938	Arellano University	Pasay City	

== Oldest schools of medicine ==
Name	Year founded	Educational institution	Location upon foundation	Ref
University of Santo Tomas Faculty of Medicine and Surgery	1871	University of Santo Tomas	Intramuros, Manila	
University of the Philippines College of Medicine	1905	University of the Philippines Manila	Manila	
Southwestern University Matias H. Aznar Memorial College of Medicine, Inc.	1946	Southwestern University	Cebu	
Manila Central University College of Medicine	1947	Manila Central University	Manila	
FEU NRMF – Institute of Medicine	1952	Far Eastern University	Manila	
UERMMMC College of Medicine	1956	University of the East	Manila	
Cebu Institute of Medicine	1957	Cebu Institute of Medicine	Cebu	
Lyceum Northwestern University Dr. Francisco Q. Duque Medical Foundation	1974	Lyceum-Northwestern University	Pangasinan	
West Visayas State University College of Medicine	1975	West Visayas State University	Iloilo	
Virgen Milagrosa University Foundation College of Medicine	1975	Virgen Milagrosa University Foundation	Pangasinan	
Saint Louis University School of Medicine	1976	Saint Louis University	Baguio	

== Oldest normal schools ==
Current name	Year founded	Name at time of foundation	Location upon foundation	Ref
Universidad de Sta. Isabel	1875	Escuela Normal de Maestras of Colegio de Sta. Isabel	Camarines Sur	
Philippine Normal University	1901	Philippine Normal School	Manila	
West Visayas State University	1902	Iloilo Normal School	Iloilo	

== Oldest schools of engineering ==
Name	Year founded	Educational institution	Location upon foundation	Ref
University of Santo Tomas Faculty of Engineering	1907	University of Santo Tomas	Intramuros, Manila	
Mapúa University	1925	Mapúa University	Manila	

== See also ==
- Education in the Philippines
  - Education in the Philippines during Spanish rule
  - Education in the Philippines during American rule
- Higher education in the Philippines
  - Medical education in the Philippines
  - Legal education in the Philippines
  - List of universities and colleges in the Philippines
  - List of Catholic universities and colleges in the Philippines
