= University Belt =

Academic district in Manila, Philippines

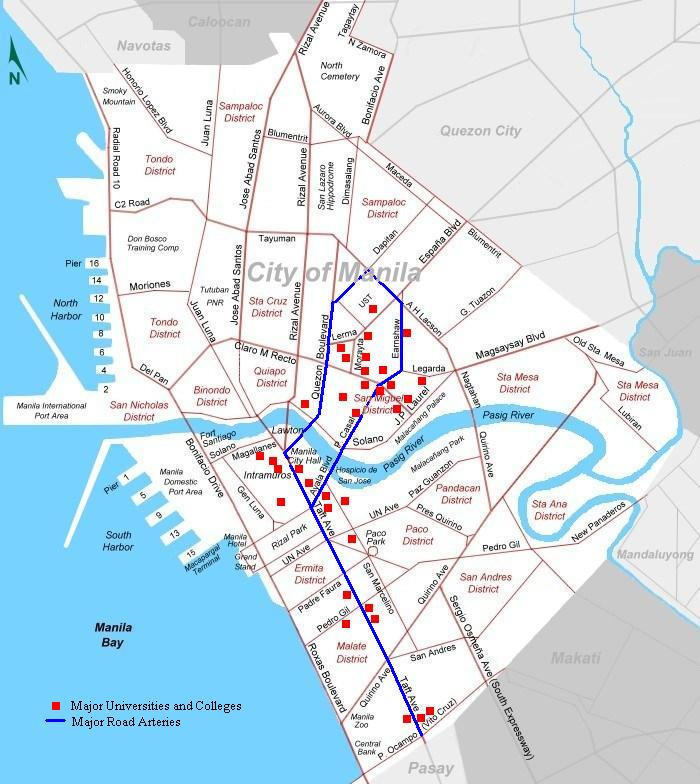
University Belt, including Taft Avenue and Intramuros as of 2007

The University Belt is a de facto subdistrict in Manila, Philippines, referring to an area with a significant concentration of major colleges and universities in the city. The districts of Quiapo, Sampaloc, and San Miguel are traditionally considered areas of the University Belt. Other clusters of schools along the southern bank of the Pasig River, mostly in the districts of Intramuros and Ermita and the southernmost part of Malate near the city limits, are also sometimes included. Each of the colleges and universities in the district is within walking distance of each other.

== History ==
Since the Spanish colonial period, Manila has been the center of education in the country, and Intramuros was home to various academic institutions. The first schools in the district were the Colegio de Santa Potenciana founded in 1589, Universidad de San Ignacio in 1590, San Jose Seminary in 1601, the University of Santo Tomas in 1611, the Colegio de San Juan de Letran in 1620, the Santa Isabel College Manila in 1632, Universidad de San Felipe de Austria in 1640, and Ateneo de Manila University in 1859. At present, only Colegio de San Juan de Letran, Santa Isabel College Manila, and the University of Santo Tomas continue to operate in Manila; Ateneo de Manila University transferred to Katipunan Avenue in Quezon City in 1952, though its Graduate School remained in Manila until 1977.

During the American period, the city planner, Daniel Burnham envisioned Manila's educational hub in Santa Mesa Heights, the area north of Sampaloc, Manila in present-day Quezon City, although the Americans wanted institutions to be near the national government center in Rizal Park, with several institutions opening in Calle Rizal (present-day Taft Avenue), among them the University of the Philippines Manila, the oldest of the constituent universities of the University of the Philippines System, and De La Salle University. Nevertheless, the University Belt within Quiapo, Sampaloc, San Miguel, and Santa Cruz began growing organically. By the early 1900s, nine institutions were present in the area: National University, Manila Law College, University of Manila, San Beda University, Saint Rita College, La Consolacion College Manila, College of the Holy Spirit, and Centro Escolar University, as well as the University of Santo Tomas, which moved from Intramuros to Sampaloc in 1927 although the older campus continued to host the College of Law.

World War II devastated the city, and several schools were forced to shut down during the war. In Intramuros, the University of Santo Tomas did not rebuild their campus in the district. At the same time, Ateneo de Manila University moved their institution to Sampaloc and eventually to Loyola Heights, Quezon City. Meanwhile, non-sectarian schools were built in the district before and after the war: Far Eastern University was founded in 1928, Mapúa University moved from its campus in Santa Cruz in 1956, while Lyceum of the Philippines University and Pamantasan ng Lungsod ng Maynila were established in 1952 and 1965 respectively. Outside Intramuros, new institutions were also founded, such as the Eulogio "Amang" Rodriguez Institute of Science and Technology in 1945 and the University of the East in 1946, among others.

== List ==
=== Within northeastern Manila ===
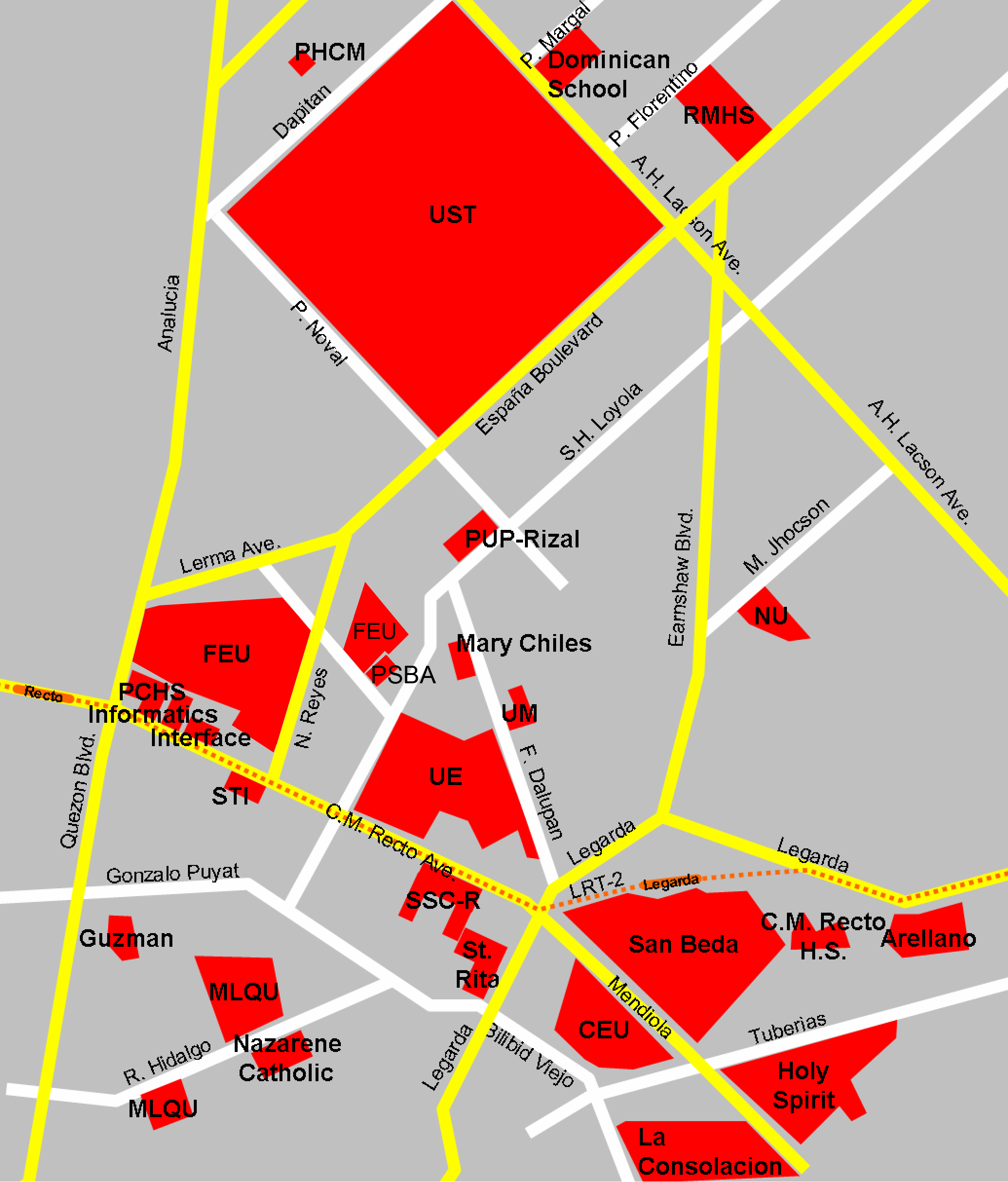
Map of the original University Belt north of the Pasig River within Sampaloc, Quiapo, and San Miguel districts. The southern end of Quezon Blvd. connects to Quezon Bridge, and the southern end of Legarda Street connects to P. Casal Street.

Included are the major universities and colleges located in Sampaloc, Quiapo, Santa Cruz, Santa Mesa, and San Miguel.

Institution	Location	Founded	Founded as
Arellano University	Sampaloc	1938	Arellano Law College
Centro Escolar University	San Miguel	1907	Centro Escolar de Señoritas
Chinese General Hospital Colleges	Santa Cruz	1921	Chinese General Hospital School of Nursing
College of the Holy Spirit Manila	San Miguel	1913	Holy Ghost School
De Ocampo Memorial College	Santa Mesa	1913	Philippine Dental College
Eulogio "Amang" Rodriguez Institute of Science and Technology	Santa Mesa	1945	Eulogio Rodriguez Vocational High School
Far Eastern University	Sampaloc	1928	Institute of Accountancy
Far Eastern University Institute of Technology	Sampaloc	1992	East Asia Institute of Computer Technology
FEATI University	Santa Cruz	1946	Far Eastern Aeronautics School
Guzman College of Science and Technology	Quiapo	1947	Safe Driving Institute
La Consolacion College Manila	San Miguel	1902	Colegio de Nuestra Señora de la Consolacion.
Manila Business College	Santa Cruz	2000	
Manila Law College	Santa Cruz	1899	Escuela de Derecho de Manila
Manuel L. Quezon University	Quiapo	1947	Manuel L. Quezon School of Law
Mary Chiles College	Sampaloc	1913	
Metropolitan Hospital College of Nursing	Santa Cruz	1976	Metropolitan Hospital College of Nursing
National Teachers College	Quiapo	1928	
National University	Sampaloc	1900	Colegio Filipino
University of Perpetual Help JONELTA (Manila campus)	Sampaloc	1968	
Philippine College of Criminology	Santa Cruz	1954	
Philippine College of Health Sciences	Sampaloc	1993	
Philippine Merchant Marine School	Santa Cruz	1950	
Philippine School of Business Administration	Sampaloc	1963	Philippine Accounting and Taxation Training School
Philsin College Foundation	Sampaloc	1995	
PMI Colleges	Santa Cruz	1948	
Polytechnic University of the Philippines	Santa Mesa	1904	Manila Business School
Saint Jude College Manila	Sampaloc	1968	St. Jude College of Nursing
Saint Rita College	Quiapo	1907	Escuela de Santa Rita
San Beda University	San Miguel	1901	El Colegio de San Beda
San Sebastian College – Recoletos	Quiapo	1941	
Santa Catalina College	Sampaloc	1706	Colegio de Santa Catalina
STI NAMEI	Santa Mesa	1947	NAMEI Polytechnic Institute
Technological Institute of the Philippines	Quiapo	1962	
University of Manila	Sampaloc	1913	Instituto de Manila
Unciano Colleges	Santa Mesa	1976	
University of the East	Sampaloc	1946	Philippine College of Commerce and Business Administration
University of Santo Tomas	Sampaloc	1611	Colegio de Nuestra Señora del Santísimo Rosario

=== Taft Avenue ===
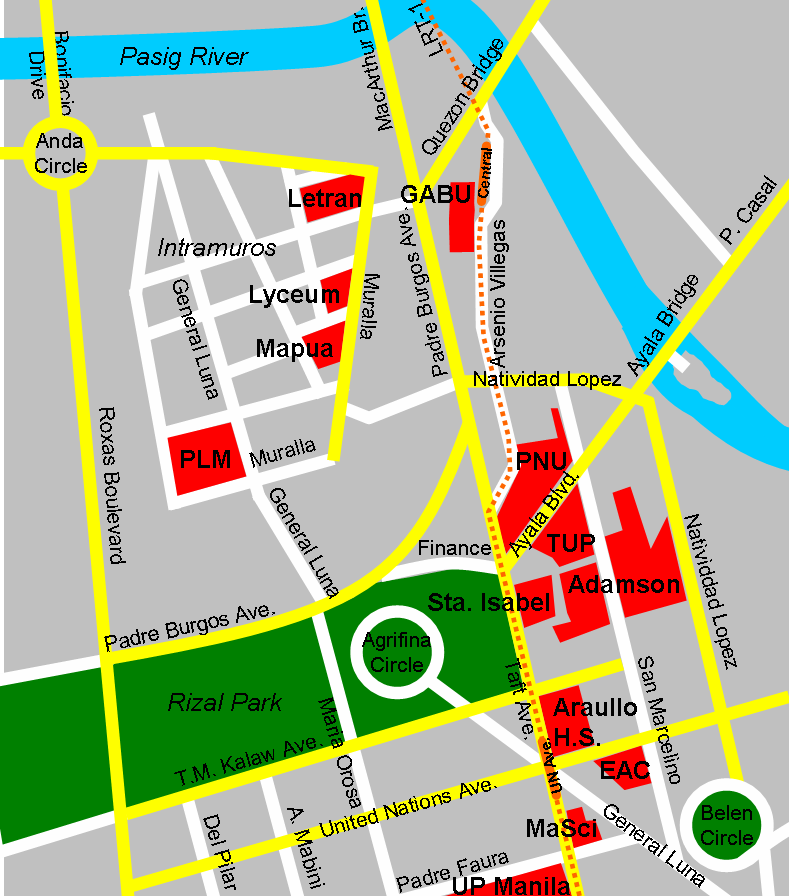
Universities between the Pasig River and Padre Faura Street

All institutions are located along or near Taft Avenue, stretching from Ermita to Malate, with a distance of 3.60 kilometers (2.24 mi) from Universidad de Manila in the north to De La Salle University in the south.

Institution	Founded	Founded as
Adamson University	1932	Adamson School of Industrial Chemistry
De La Salle–College of Saint Benilde	1980	College of Career Development
De La Salle University	1911	De La Salle College
Emilio Aguinaldo College	1957	Marian School of Midwifery
Philippine Christian University	1946	Manila Union University
Philippine Normal University	1901	Philippine Normal School
Philippine Women's University	1919	Philippine Women's College
St. Paul University Manila	1912	St. Paul Institutions
Santa Isabel College Manila	1632	Colegio de Santa Isabel
St. Scholastica's College, Manila	1906	
Technological University of the Philippines	1901	Manila Trade School
Universidad de Manila	1995	City College of Manila
University of the Philippines Manila	1905	Philippine Medical School

=== Intramuros ===
All institutions are located within the walled city of Intramuros. It also lies close to the northern tip of the Taft Avenue cluster.

Institution	Founded	Founded as
Colegio de San Juan de Letran	1620	Colegio de Niños Huerfanos de San Juan de Letran
Colegio de Santa Rosa	1750	Beaterio y Casa de Ensenanza
Lyceum of the Philippines University	1952	Lyceum of the Philippines
Mapúa University	1925	Mapúa Institute of Technology
PNTC Colleges	1994	Philippine Nautical Training Institute
Pamantasan ng Lungsod ng Maynila	1965	University of the City of Manila

== See also ==
- Big Four (universities)
- Hugh Wilson Hall
- List of universities and colleges in Metro Manila
