= Dispute over the oldest school in the Philippines =

The oldest universities, colleges, vocational schools and the first modern public education system in Asia were created during the Spanish colonial period. The earliest schools were founded by Spanish Catholic missionaries. By the time Spain was replaced by the United States as the colonial power, Filipinos were among the most educated people in all of Asia. Of the many educational institutions established during the colonial era, only a few remain extant today, such as the University of Santo Tomas (1611), Colegio de San Juan de Letran (1620), Real Colegio de Santa Potenciana (1590), Universidad de San Ignacio (1590), Colegio de San Ildefonso (1595), Santa Isabel College Manila (1632), and the Universidad de San Felipe de Austria (1640), among others.

The title of the oldest in the Philippines, however, have been topic for debate between two educational institutions: the University of Santo Tomas and the University of San Carlos.

== Claimants ==
=== Claim of the University of Santo Tomas (UST) ===
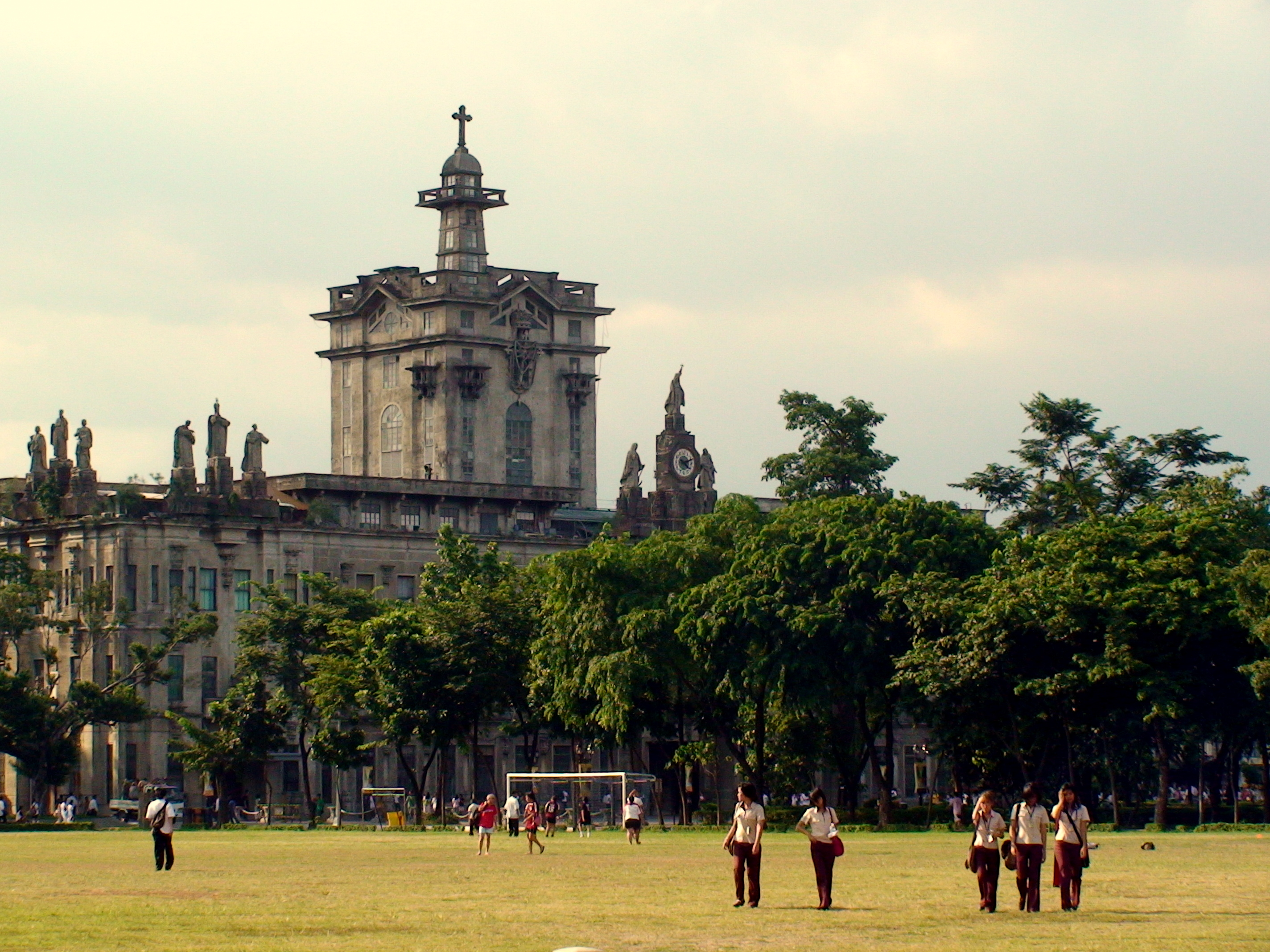
The Royal and Pontifical University of Santo Tomas, established by the Dominican missionaries in 1611 and raised to the rank of a university in 1645 by Pope Innocent X through the petition of Philip IV of Spain, is currently the educational institution with the oldest extant university charter in Asia.

The University of Santo Tomas was established in 1611 as the Colegio de Nuestra Señora de Santisimo Rosario and gained university status in 1645. The university is generally recognized as the educational institution in the Philippines with the oldest extant university charter. Government recognition was evident as early as the US colonial era when in 1935 the Commonwealth government of the Philippines through the Historical Research and Markers Committee declared that UST was "oldest university under the American flag." In the 1990s, the Intramuros Administration installed a marker on the original site of the University of Santo Tomas with the recognition that the university is the "oldest university in Asia." In 2011 the University of Santo Tomas celebrated its Quadricentennial (400th Anniversary).

=== Claim of the University of San Carlos (USC) ===
Unlike the University of Santo Tomas which has an undisputed foundation date, the true foundation year of the University of San Carlos had been a subject of several debates. Contrary to the position of the University of Santo Tomas, the University of San Carlos claims that it is older by 16 years by tracing its roots to the Colegio de San Ildefonso (established 1595). According to the university's claim, San Carlos traces its roots to the Colegio de San Ildefonso founded by three Spanish Jesuit missionaries Antonio Sedeno, Pedro Chirino and Antonio Pereira on August 1, 1595. It was closed in 1769 at the expulsion of the Jesuits by the order of King Charles III under a royal decree. In 1783, Bishop Mateo Joaquin de Arevalo initiated the opening of the Colegio-Seminario de San Carlos. King Charles III once again ordered it to reopen under the Diocesan of Cebu from the Jesuits. In 1852, the management of the college was entrusted to the Dominican Christian priests, replaced in 1867 by the Vincentian Fathers then, in 1935, the Societas Verbi Divini or the Society of the Divine Word (SVD). The Colegio de San Carlos (CSC) was granted its university charter in 1948, and in 1995 celebrated its Quadricentennial (400th Anniversary).

=== Claim of San Jose Seminary ===
The San Jose Seminary in Loyola Heights, Quezon City makes no direct claim to titles of "oldest," although it traces its direct origin from the Colegio de San Jose, which was established in 1601 by the Society of Jesus.

== UST as Asia's oldest university ==
Numerous scholars and official government bodies have reviewed the case. According to Dr. Victor Torres of the De La Salle University, the University of San Carlos' claim dates back to 1948 only when USC was declared a university. Fidel Villarroel from the University of Santo Tomas argued that USC only took over the facility of the former Colegio de San Ildefonso and that there is no 'visible' and 'clear' link between San Carlos and San Ildefonso. According to Fr. Aloysius Cartagenas, a professor at the Seminario Mayor de San Carlos of Cebu, "following Church tradition, the foundation event and date of University of San Carlos should be the decree of Bishop Romualdo Jimeno on 15 May 1867 (turning over the seminary to the Congregation of the Missions) and the first day of classes in the history of what is now USC is 1 July 1867, the day P. Jose Casarramona welcomed the first lay students to attend classes at the Seminario de San Carlos." Thus, he says that San Carlos cannot claim to have descended from the Colegio de San Ildefonso founded by the Jesuits in 1595, despite taking over the latter's facilities when the Jesuits were expelled by Spanish authorities in 1769. According to him there is "no visible and clear link" between Colegio de San Ildefonso and USC. San Carlos was specifically for the training of diocesan priests, and it simply took over the facility of the former, a Jesuit central house with an attached day school.

In 2010, the National Historical Commission of the Philippines installed a bronze marker declaring USC's foundation late in the 18th century, effectively disproving any direct connection with the Colegio de San Ildefonso.

In 2011 Pope Benedict XVI recognized UST as "the oldest institution of Catholic higher education in the Far East."

Complementing its previous position, the National Historical Commission of the Philippines in 2012 released an article in its website recognizing UST as "Asia's Oldest University. This further cemented the status of the Pontifical and Royal University of Santo Tomas as the oldest extant university in the Philippines and in Asia.

== See also ==
- Education in the Philippines
  - Education in the Philippines during Spanish rule
  - Education in the Philippines during American rule
- Higher education in the Philippines
  - Medical education in the Philippines
  - Legal education in the Philippines
  - List of universities and colleges in the Philippines
  - List of Catholic universities and colleges in the Philippines
