= Arellano University Graduate School =

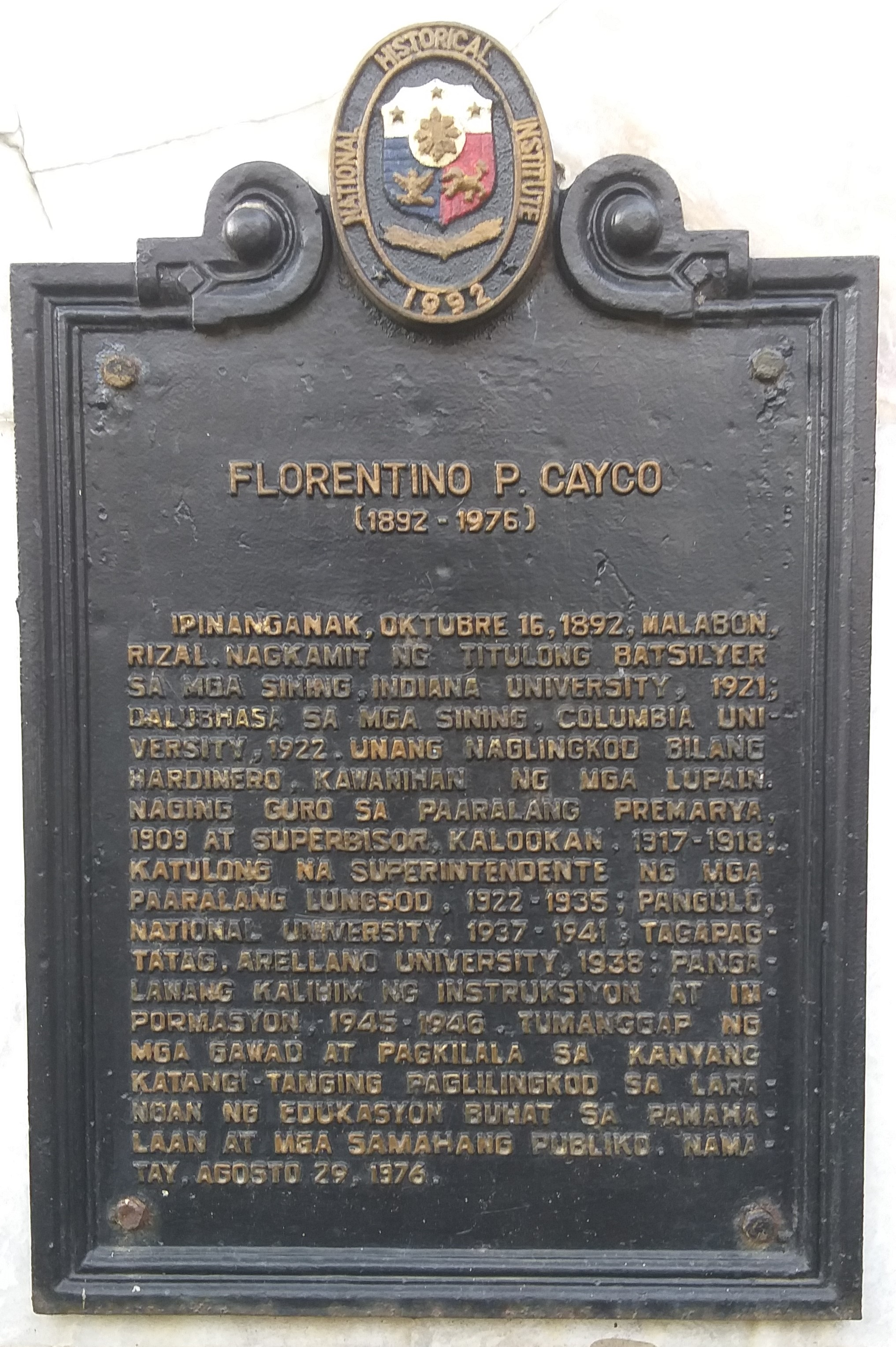
- Historical Marker dedicated to Florentino P. Cayco
- Philippines

Information
- Type: Private
- Motto: For God and Country
- School district: University Belt
- Campus type: Urban
- Color
- Mascot: Chiefs
- Website: www.arellano.edu.ph

Arellano University Graduate School, officially as Florentino Cayco Memorial School of Graduate Studies in honor of the founder and first President of the university, is the graduate school of Arellano University. It is also known as the graduate business school of the university as it offers the Master of Business Administration program.

The Graduate School of Education offers courses of Doctor of Education, major in Educational Management; Master of Arts in Psychology and Master of Arts in Education, major in Early Childhood Education, Education Management & Supervision, English, Filipino, Guidance and Counseling, Home Economics, Mathematics and Psychology and Special Education. The Psychology and Special Education has two Plans, Plan A is with Master's Thesis and Plan B with Special Research Project.

The Graduate School of Nursing is one of the major academics offered by Arellano University with a PACUCOA Level II. It offers the course Master of Arts in Nursing, major in Mental Health & Psychiatric Nursing, Medical and Surgical Nursing, Community Health Nursing, Maternal and Child Nursing, Administration and Supervision in Nursing and Occupational Health Nursing.

The Graduate School of Business offers the master's degree in Business Administration, which specializes in General Management, Marketing, Operations, Organizational Management and Finance.
