= Colegio de Santa Rosa - Makati =

Roman Catholic college in Makati, Philippines

Colegio de Sta. Rosa-Makati
- Dalubhasaan ng Sta. Rosa sa Makati (Filipino)

Location
- 6321 Estrella St. Makati, Metro Manila; Philippines; 14°33′43″N 121°02′24″E

Information
- Other name: Roseña
- Type: Private, Catholic, Dominican exclusive all-girls school
- Motto: Quasi Plantatio Rosae (Latin)
- Religious affiliations: Roman Catholic (Augustinian Recollect)
- Established: 1964; 62 years ago
- Campus: Urban
- Colors: Pink; White
- Affiliations: PAASCU CEAP
- Hymn: Colegio De Santa Rosa Hymn (Himno Del Colegio De Santa Rosa)
- Website: www.csr.edu.ph

Colegio de Sta. Rosa - Makati, also referred to by its acronym CSR - Makati is a private Catholic institution of learning, run by the Congregation of the Augustinian Recollect Sisters in Rockwell, Makati in the Philippines.

== History ==
The College traces its roots to Colegio de Santa Rosa - Intramuros. The parent school was founded in 1750 by M. Paula de la Santisima Trinidad, a Dominican Tertiary from Spain. The day when it opened was on August 30, 1750. Colegio de Sta. Rosa, in its earlier years was also known as the “Beaterio”. It has survived the political upheavals in our country's history and passed through several periods in its direction and management. In 1801, the chairmanship of its Board of Control was given by the Spanish governor to the Vicar Provincial of the Order of Recollect Fathers in the Philippines, and his successors, and it has remained with them up this day.

Under the able management of the Daughters of Charity, Colegio de Sta. Rosa continued to give Christian formation to young Filipino girls until World War II, when in the battle of Manila, between the Japanese and American forces, its school buildings were totally destroyed.

The school building was reconstructed in 1948; the school reopened with the Sisters of the Congregation of the Servants of St. Joseph managing it. In 1964, these Sisters, animated with the same sentiment that inspired M.Paula when she founded the school in Intramuros, responded to the demands for a Catholic institution in the then growing municipality of Makati. Under the leadership of Rev. Fr. Moises Lopez, OAR, who was then president of the Board of Trustees, Colegio de Sta. Rosa acquired the lot offered by the Makati Development Corporation. Government permit was secured to open Colegio de Sta. Rosa, as a branch of CSR, Intramuros.

With Mo. Alfonsa Vilches, SSJ, as Mother Superior and school head, three Sisters and one lay teacher, pioneering in this new educational endeavor of their Congregation, the school was officially opened in July 1964 with only 23 pupils in Kinder and seven in grade one. Classes were in the makeshift rooms while construction of the building was going on. In the following year the school admitted up to grade six. In 1966, grade seven was opened from grade school. Four years later, however, the school turned out 17 high school graduates.

Colegio de Sta Rosa continued to prosper and gain a reputation as a quality school. Its history took a new turn again at the end of school year 1980–1981. The Servants of Saint Joseph, desiring to return to the original charism of their Congregation, withdrew from administering Colegio de Sta. Rosa, and the management of the school was given to the Augustinian Recollect Sisters.

Both the Grade School and High School Departments have been awarded Level 2 accreditation status by the Philippine Accrediting Association of School Colleges and Universities (PAASCU) on School year 2025-2026 CSR Makati became a coed school introducing boys and girls.
