= Colegio de San Ildefonso, Cebu City =

Defunct education institution in Cebu City, Philippines

Colegio de San Ildefonso
- Type: Private
- Active: 1595–1769
- Founders: Fr. Antonio Sedeño, SJ; Fr. Pedro Chirino, SJ; Fr. Antonio Pereira, SJ
- Religious affiliation: Catholic (Jesuit)
- Location: Cebu City, Cebu, Philippines
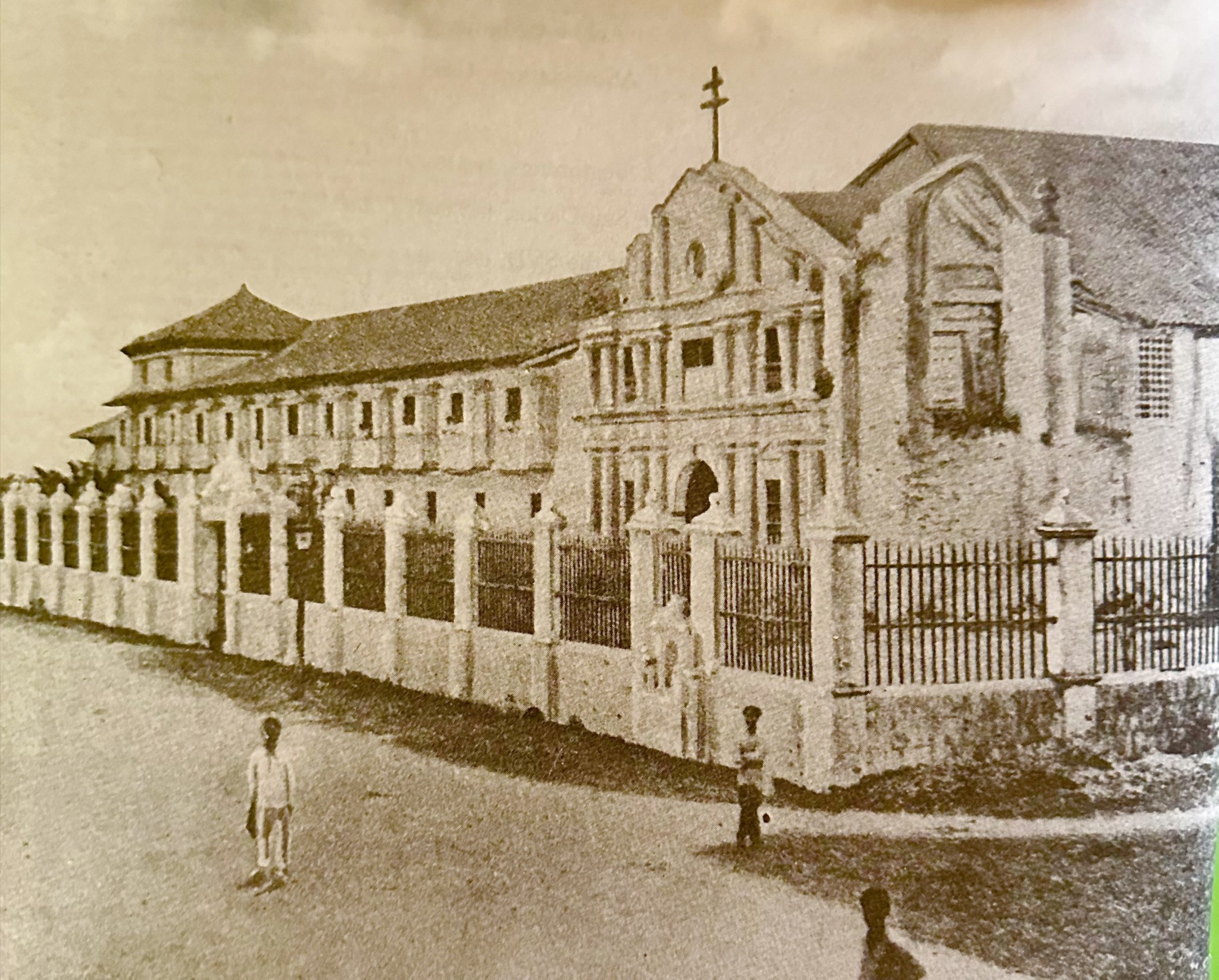

The Colegio de San Ildefonso was an educational institution run by the Society of Jesus in Cebu City, Philippines in the then Spanish Captaincy General of the Philippines. It was established by the Jesuits in 1595 thus making it the first European-founded educational institution in Asia. In Mexico City, the Jesuits had founded a college with the same name in 1588. The Cebu City college was established by Fr. Antonio Sedeño, Fr. Pedro Chirino, and Antonio Pereira of the Society of Jesus in August 1595. After the expulsion of the Jesuits from Spanish territories in 1767, the buildings and facilities were taken over by the Diocese of Cebu, then by the Congregation of the Mission, and later by the Society of the Divine Word.

The present-day University of San Carlos traces its roots to the Colegio de San Ildefonso. However, this claim is disputed by the Royal and Pontifical University of Santo Tomas, and by several other historians.

== Early history ==
In 1595, Fr. Antonio Sedeno, Fr. Pedro Chirino, and Antonio Pereira of the Society of Jesus established a grammar school attached to the Jesuit residence in Cebu City. In 1606, it was officially named as the Colegio de San Ildefonso. In 1608, it was reduced to a primary school for boys due to the lack of students as many Spanish residents left Cebu to settle in Manila.

== Suppression of the Society of Jesus ==
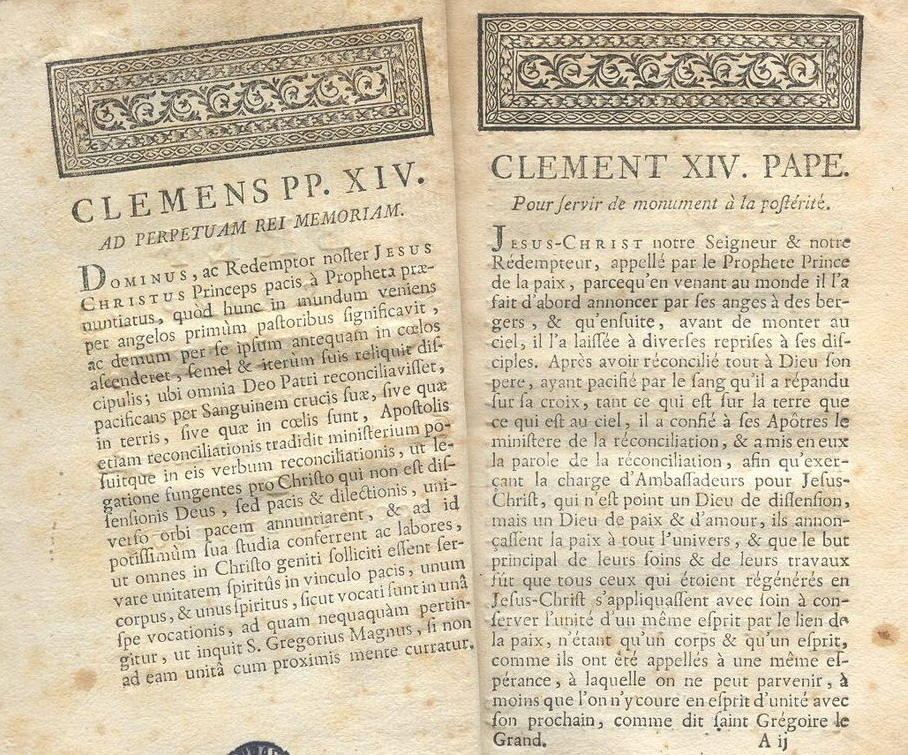
The papal brief, Dominus ac Redemptor, of Pope Clement XIV.

=== Dominus ac Redemptor ===
For a few years Clement XIV tried to placate the enemies of the Jesuits by treating them harshly: he refused to meet the Superior General, Lorenzo Ricci, ordered them not to receive novices, etc., to no avail. The pressure kept building up to the point that Catholic countries were threatening to break away from the Church. Clement XIV ultimately yielded "in the name of peace of the Church and to avoid of secession in Europe" and suppressed the Society of Jesus by the brief Dominus ac Redemptor on 21 July 1773.

=== Expulsion of the Jesuits from the Philippines ===
The royal decree of King Charles III of Spain banishing the Society of Jesus from Spain and the Spanish dominions reached Manila on May 17, 1768. Between 1769 and 1771 the Jesuits in the Philippines were transported to Spain and from there deported to Italy. The Jesuits surrendered the San Ildefonso to Spanish civil authorities in 1768, thus closing the institution.

== Later years ==
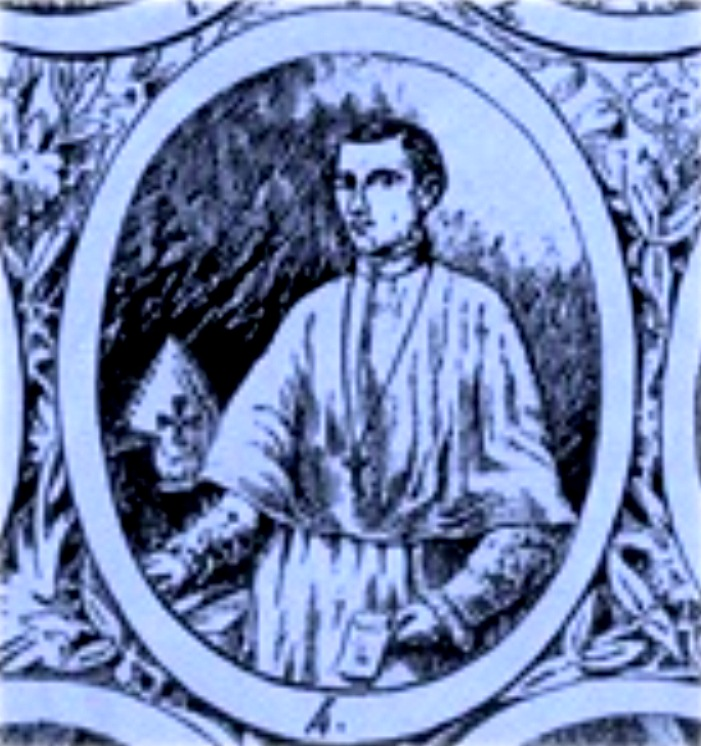
Bishop Mateo Joaquin Rubio de Arevalo

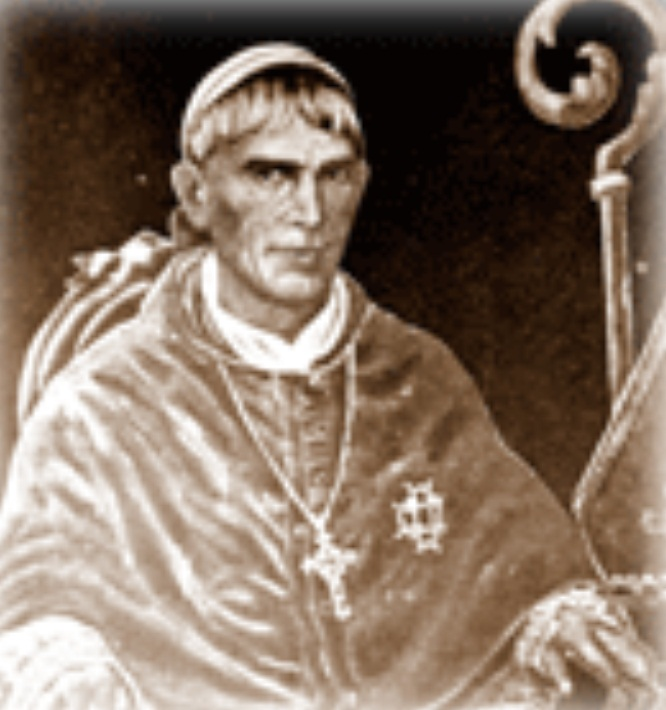
Bishop Romualdo Jimeno

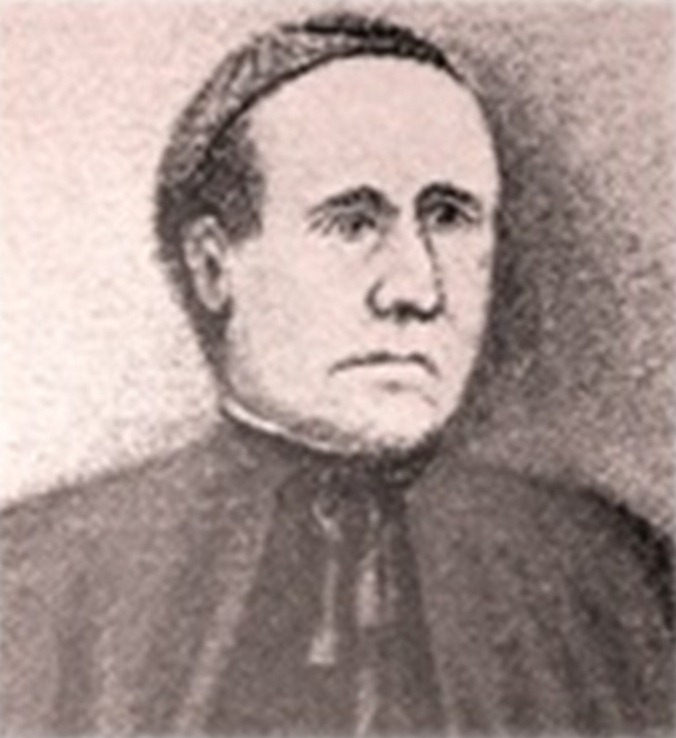
Fr. Jose Casarramona, CM

Colegio de San Ildefonso's buildings were not demolished and were left to fall to ruin until Most Rev. Mateo Joaquin Rubio de Arevalo, bishop of Cebu, requested King Charles III of Spain on October 25, 1777, for the legal bequest of the land and building of the closed Colegio and use it for an institution exclusively devoted to the training of candidates to the priesthood in his diocese.

The King's decree dated October 29, 1779 granted the request and decreed the founding of a diocesan seminary to be called Real Seminario de San Carlos. But it was not until August 23, 1783, that the royal decree was executed and the administration of the seminary was given to the Diocesan Clergy of Cebu. The seminary became a mixed seminary, a seminary-college, offering courses to the candidates for the priesthood and, besides, some basic courses in humanities (then called latinidad) to non-boarding Cebuano kids. In view of the delicate and demanding nature of seminary work that only a few diocesan priests were prepared to assume at the time, the Dominican Bishop of Cebu, Romualdo Jimeno, invited fellow Dominicans to lend the diocesan clergy a helping hand. From 1852 to 1867 scholars from Manila took turns in acting as professors and Regents of Studies. During this period the seminary shed off its royal identity when it became Seminario Conciliar de San Carlos, a diocesan seminary according to the rules laid down by the Council of Trent.

When the Congregation of the Missions arrived in 1862 to administer the seminaries in the Philippine islands, Bishop Jimeno invited them on March 2, 1863, to take charge of the seminary. The request was fulfilled on January 23, 1867, with the arrival of the Congregation of the Mission or Padres Paules, as they were fondly called. Finally, on May 15, 1867, Bishop Jimeno issued a decree ordering the turnover of the school facilities and buildings to the congregation. The Congregation turned it into a seminario-colegio, or a seminary with a program of secondary education for boys not intended for ecclesiastical service. In 1891 the seminary obtained recognition for its secondary education program and in 1893 it had a 5-year Bachelor of Arts curriculum under the supervision the University of Santo Tomas in Manila. On July 1, 1867, Padre Jose Casarramona welcomed the first lay students to attend classes. The Society of the Divine Word took over the college in 1935. It became a university in 1948.

== Link to the University of San Carlos ==
The title of the oldest in the Philippines have been topic for debate between two educational institutions: the University of Santo Tomas and the University of San Carlos.

The University of San Carlos makes the claim of tracing its roots to the Colegio de San Ildefonso founded by the Spanish Jesuits fathers Antonio Sedeno, Pedro Chirino and Antonio Pereira in 1595. USC celebrated its quadricentennial in 1995. This claim is opposed by the University of Santo Tomas, which argues that USC only took over the facility of the former Colegio de San Ildefonso and that there is no 'visible' and 'clear' link between San Carlos and San Ildefonso.

Numerous scholars and official government bodies have reviewed the case. According to Dr. Victor Torres of the De La Salle University, the University of San Carlos' claim dates back to 1948 only when USC was declared a university. Fidel Villarroel from the University of Santo Tomas argued that USC only took over the facility of the former Colegio de San Ildefonso and that there is no 'visible' and 'clear' link between San Carlos and San Ildefonso. According to Fr. Aloysius Cartagenas, a professor at the Seminario Mayor de San Carlos of Cebu, “following Church tradition, the foundation event and date of University of San Carlos should be the decree of Bishop Romualdo Jimeno on 15 May 1867 (turning over the seminary to the Congregation of the Missions) and the first day of classes in the history of what is now USC is 1 July 1867, the day P. Jose Casarramona welcomed the first lay students to attend classes at the Seminario de San Carlos.” Thus, he says that San Carlos cannot claim to have descended from the Colegio de San Ildefonso founded by the Jesuits in 1595, despite taking over the latter's facilities when the Jesuits were expelled by Spanish authorities in 1769. According to him there is “no visible and clear link” between Colegio de San Ildefonso and USC. San Carlos was specifically for the training of diocesan priests, and it simply took over the facility of the former, a Jesuit central house with an attached day school.

== See also ==
- List of Jesuit educational institutions
