= Hugh Wilson Hall =

Dormitory in Manila, Philippines

Hugh Wilson Hall

The Hugh Wilson Hall is a dormitory building located in Sampaloc, Manila, Philippines. It was built before World War II in 1923 by Madaleine Klepper as a dormitory for female students studying in universities and colleges within the University Belt area of Sampaloc district. Madaleine Klepper was an American missionary of the Women's Foreign Missionary Society of the Methodist Episcopal Church of New York, US. Along with the dormitory building, the mission house and a chapel can also be found on the same property along P. Paredes Street corner Lerma Street.

During its infancy years, the Hugh Wilson Hall served as dormitory for girls then expanding the missionary services as a social action center for the poor communities surrounding Sampaloc district.

Then in November 12, 1971, with the expiration of the Laurel-Langley Agreement between the Philippines and the United States of America, the Women's Foreign Missionary Society of the Methodist Episcopal Church of New York, US donated the property including the Hugh Wilson Hall to Kapatiran - Kaunlaran Foundation, Inc. (KKFI) which was established on the same date. Though the property has changed its ownership, its social welfare services still continues up to this day.

Today, the Hugh Wilson Hall is still used as a dormitory for girls by Kapatiran - Kaunlaran Foundation, Inc. serving students of the University Belt area. Profits earned from the revenue of the dormitory were used to fund the social welfare services of the foundation.
