= Colegio de Santa Rosa =

Roman Catholic college in Manila, Philippines

Colegio De Santa Rosa Manila
- Dalubhasaan ng Santa Rosa sa Manila (Filipino)
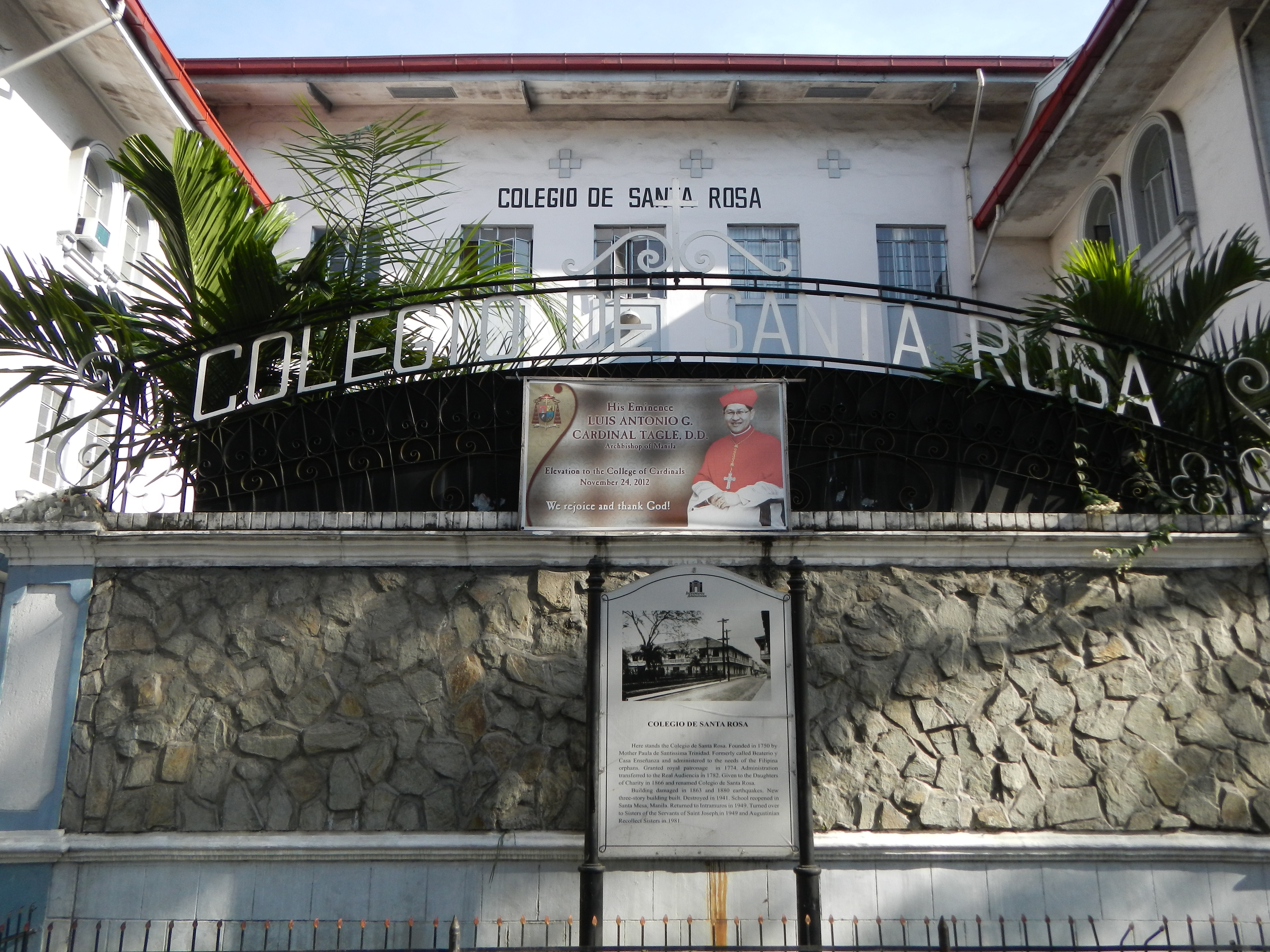
- Façade and marker of Colegio de Santa Rosa in Intramuros
- Former name: Beaterio y Casa de Ensenanza (1750–1774)
- Motto: Quasi Plantatio Rosae (Latin)
- Established: August 30, 1750
- Founder: Mo. Paula de la Santisima Trinidad
- Religious affiliation: Catholic Church (Augustinian Recollect Sisters)
- Location: Beaterio cor. Solana St., Intramuros, Manila, Philippines; 14°35′32″N 120°58′29″E
- Location in Manila Location in Metro Manila Location in Luzon Location in the Philippines

Colegio de Santa Rosa - Manila is a private Catholic school run by the Congregation of the Augustinian Recollect Sisters in Intramuros, Manila, Philippines. It was established on August 30, 1750, as the Beaterio y Casa de Segunda Enseñanza by Mother Paula de la Santissima Trinidad to educate young Spanish-Filipino women. It was originally an all-girls school until the early 2000s, when it became a coeducational institution. It acquired its present name in 1774, but was also known by several other names, including Colegio de Madre Paula and Beaterio y Casa de Enseñanza.

== History ==
In 1739, a residential structure was demolished to make way for the construction of Colegio de Santa Rosa. Plaza de Santo Tomas served as the pocket plaza between Colegio de Santa Rosa and the former site of the University of Santo Tomas. The long, narrow plaza was dedicated to Thomas Aquinas. The statue of Fray Miguel de Benavides along with wrought iron fence attached in the 19th century and royal palms was also located at the middle of the plaza.

Paula de Santissima Trinidad, or Paula Tejedor del Atas was born in Espluga Calba, Tarragona, Catalonia, Spain on 1713. She went to Lerida to work as a 'criada', or maid in order to immerse herself as a social worker. From Tarragona to Manresa, she arrived in Manila on July 15, 1750 with the purpose of establishing a school for half Spanish half Filipino young women. She pleaded donations to wealthy Spaniards such as Don Pedro González Quijano and Don Francisco Javier Salgado in order to sustain her advocacy in establishing the school. Two houses, along Calle Solana, in front of the portería of the convent of Santo Domingo and another one facing the chapel of the University of Santo Tomas, were given as donations, respectively.

In August 1750, along with the school, the beaterio was built and was placed under the protection of Santa Rosa de Lima. On September 22, 1774, the school and beaterio were placed under royal patronage – through the Real Cedula of 1774 by the Spanish Monarch Order. However, the institution must accept girls of other races in return. On June 16, 1782, she died and was buried at the chapel of the Virgin in Santo Domingo Church.

Both institutions were later turned-over to the care of the Dominican friars, and subsequently passed-on to the Royal Audiencia in 1784, and then to a junta of alumnae and matrons of the city until 1886 when administration was transferred to the Daughters of Charity (Paules sisters), who renamed the school Colegio de Sta. Rosa. Two earthquakes in 1863 and 1880 paved the way for the construction of a new, bigger structure in place of the ruins. However, the building was destroyed by the initial bombing of Manila in 1941 forcing the sisters to transfer the school to Sta. Mesa.

In 1948, the school returned to Intramuros with new administrators, the Sisters of the Congregation of the Servants of St. Joseph. In 1964, they shared the same sentiment that inspired Madre Paula when she founded the school in Intramuros, thus, responding to the demands for a Catholic institution in the municipality of Makati. Under the leadership of Rev. Fr. Moises Lopez, OAR, who was then president of the Board of Trustees, Colegio de Sta. Rosa acquired the lot offered by the Makati Development Corporation. Government permit was secured to open Colegio de Sta. Rosa in Makati, as a branch. Augustinian Recollect sisters are the present administrators from 1981 to the present day.

Currently, Colegio de Santa Rosa has three branches: the original and first branch in Intramuros, founded in 1750; the all-girls school branch in Makati, founded in 1964; and the branch in Trece Martires, Cavite, founded in 1997.

== Present condition ==
Although the post-war school buildings followed the modern style; recently, the buildings have undergone a facelift and the facade of Colegio de Sta. Rosa in Intramuros has been recreated in concrete rather than its original wood construction.

=== Marker from National Historical Commission of the Philippines ===
The marker of Colegio de Sta. Rosa was installed on August 25, 1979 at Intramuros, Manila.

Colegio de Sta. Rosa
UNANG NAKILALA SA PANGALANG BEATERIO Y CASA DE ENSEÑANZA. ITO AY ITINATAG NI MADRE PAULA DE LA SANTISIMA TRINIDAD SA INTRAMUROS NOONG 1750 UPANG ANG MGA BATANG PILIPINA AY MABIGYAN NG KARUNUNGAN AT KAALAMANG MAKAKRISTIYANO AT TURUAN ANG MGA ITO NG MGA GAWAING PANTAHANAN PARA SA KANILANG IPAGIGING MABUBUTING MAMAMAYAN. BINIGYAN NG PANGALANG COLEGIO DE STA. ROSA NOONG 1774. NOONG 1941 ANG TATLONG PALAPAG NA GUSALI NITO AY NASIRA AT MULING IPINAAYOS NOONG 1949 SA PANGANGASIWA NG SIERVAS DE SAN JOSE.

SA PAARALANG ITO NAGTAPOS SI TEODORA ALONSO, ANG INA NI JOSE RIZAL.

== Notable alumni ==
- Carmen Planas
- Teodora Alonso Realonda

== See also ==
- Colegio de Santa Rosa - Makati
