= Real Colegio de Santa Potenciana =

Santa Potenciana College
- Colegio de Santa Potenciana
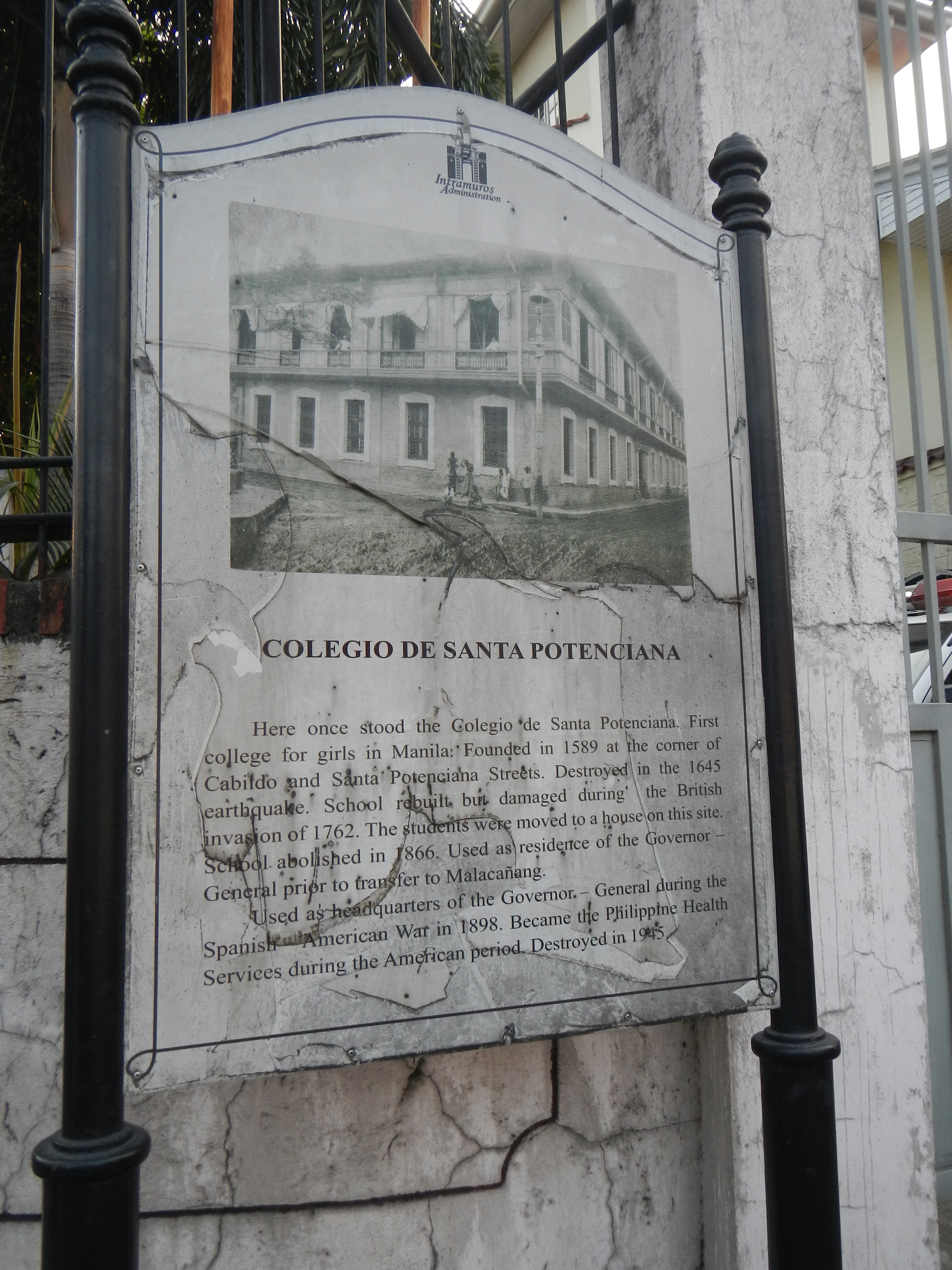
- Historical Marker of Real Colegio de Santa Potenciana
- Active: 1589–1866
- Location: Intramuros, Manila, Captaincy General of the Philippines
- Gender: Girls'

The Santa Potenciana College or Colegio de Santa Potenciana was the first school for girls established in 1589 in the Philippines. It was intended to provide shelter for the orphans of the military personnel. The building was ruined by the 1645 earthquake. The site was later used for the construction of the Palacio del Gobernador (which was destroyed by the 1863 earthquake). At present, the Philippine Veterans Building, Insurance Center Building, and the Philippine National Red Cross Main Office stand on its former site.

== History ==
The Royal College of Santa Potenciana was established in 1589 by Philip II - urging the Manila bishop, Domingo de Salazar, OP and the Franciscans. In 1592, the school drew its charter, cited the main reason for its foundation; the lack of educational opportunity for girls. In 1594, the school was opened to the public. Capitán Luis de Vivanco donated the original site for the college. Although employing stone construction as anticipation for strong earthquakes, the 1645 earthquake left the College of Santa Potenciana in a ruined state. In the 17th century, the school was transferred to the corner of Calle Cabildo and Calle Santa Potenciana. By the end of the 18th century, the Palacio del Gobernador was constructed, incorporating the ruins of College of Santa Potenciana.

Government offices were moved into the new building of College of Santa Potenciana in 1866 due to the destruction of Palacio del Gobernador by the 1863 earthquake. Due to that circumstance, the enrollment rate in the College of Santa Potenciana dropped - with the remaining student boarders transfer to Colegio de Sta. Isabel. Later on, these two institutions were merged; thus, paved the way for the dissolution of the College of Santa Potenciana.

The new building of College of Santa Potenciana became the official governor-general's palace. However, the incoming governor-general decided to transfer to Malacañang Palace in San Miguel, Manila. The building was, then, turned over to the Segundo Cabo, the second-in-command of the military after the governor-general. It housed the Subinspecciones de Infantería, Caballería, Carabineros and the Guardia Civil. The building was destroyed by the 1880 earthquake.

== Present condition ==
Philippine Veterans Bank and the Red Cross Main Building presently occupy the former site of Santa Potenciana and the National Commission for Culture and the Arts building the 19th-century site.

=== Marker from the Intramuros Administration ===
Colegio de Santa Potenciana
HERE ONCE STOOD THE COLEGIO DE SANTA POTENCIANA. FIRST COLLEGE FOR GIRLS IN MANILA. FOUNDED IN 1589 AT THE CORNER OF CABILDO AND SANTA POTENCIANA STREETS. DESTROYED IN THE 1645 EARTHQUAKE. SCHOOL REBUILT BUT DAMAGED DURING THE BRITISH INVASION OF 1762. THE STUDENTS WERE MOVED TO A HOUSE ON THIS SITE. SCHOOL ABOLISHED IN 1866. USED AS RESIDENCE OF THE GOVERNOR-GENERAL PRIOR TO TRANSFER TO MALACAÑANG.

USED AS HEADQUARTERS OF THE GOVERNOR-GENERAL DURING THE SPANISH-AMERICAN WAR IN 1898. BECAME THE PHILIPPINE HEALTH SERVICES DURING THE AMERICAN PERIOD. DESTROYED IN 1945.
