= Universidad de San Felipe de Austria =

- Type: Public
- Active: 1640–1643
- Location: Manila, Captaincy General of the Philippines

The Universidad de San Felipe de Austria was the first public university in the Philippines.

The educational institution was established by royal decree on December 23, 1640, by Governor-General Sebastian Hurtado de Corcuera. It closed down in 1644.
