= Santa Isabel College Manila =

Roman Catholic college in Manila, Philippines

Santa Isabel College of Manila
- Dalubhasáan nañg Santa Isabel (Filipino); Real Colegio de Santa Isabel (Spanish)
- Seal
- Former names: Colegio de Santa Isabel (1632–1733); Real Colegio de Santa Isabel (1733–1947)
- Motto: Caritas-Humilitas-Sapientia-Disciplina (Latin)
- Motto in English: Charity Humility Knowledge Discipline
- Type: Private, Non-profit, Basic and Higher education institution
- Established: October 24, 1632; 393 years ago
- Religious affiliation: Roman Catholic (Daughters of Charity)
- Academic affiliations: DC-SLMES, CEAP, SMEC, PAASCU
- President: Ma. Myrna C. Bas
- Vice-president: Myrha Rowena Merene (VP for Student Development & Well-being); Teresita Abastillas (VP for Administrative Services and Finance)
- Principal: Zenaida C. Sison (Principal, Basic Education Department); Michelle Angela C. Isip (Vice-Principal, Basic Education Department)
- Patron Saints: Santo Cristo del Tesoro; Vincent de Paul; Louise de Marillac; Elizabeth of Hungary; Catherine Laboure
- Location: 210 Taft Avenue, Ermita, Manila, Philippines; 14°35′08″N 120°59′03″E
- Campus: Urban Main Campus Manila
- Alma Mater song: Santo Cristo Hymn
- Named after: Elisabeth of France, Queen of Spain
- Colors: Maroon and Gold
- Nickname: Isabelans
- Website: www.santaisabel.edu.ph
- Location in Manila Location in Metro Manila Location in Luzon Location in the Philippines

The Santa Isabel College, also referred to by its acronym SIC, is a private, Roman Catholic college owned and operated by the Sisters of Charity of Saint Vincent De Paul in Ermita, Manila, Philippines. It was founded on 24 October 1632. Santa Isabel College is one of the oldest colleges in the Philippines and in Asia.

In 2018, its administration building and the chapel of the Sto. Cristo de Tesoro was declared National Cultural treasure by the National Museum of the Philippines.

== History ==
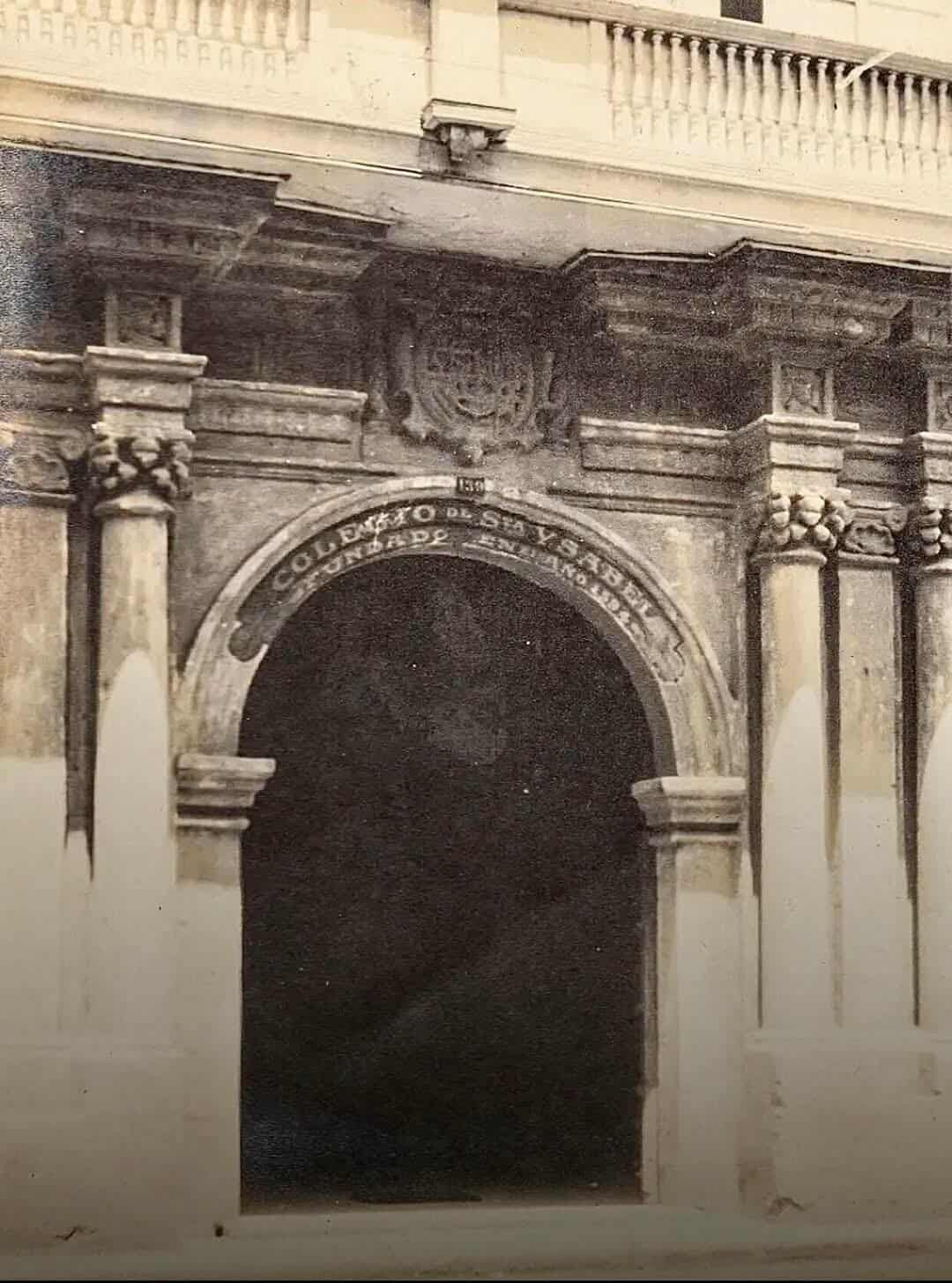
Colegio de Santa Isabel Intramuros.

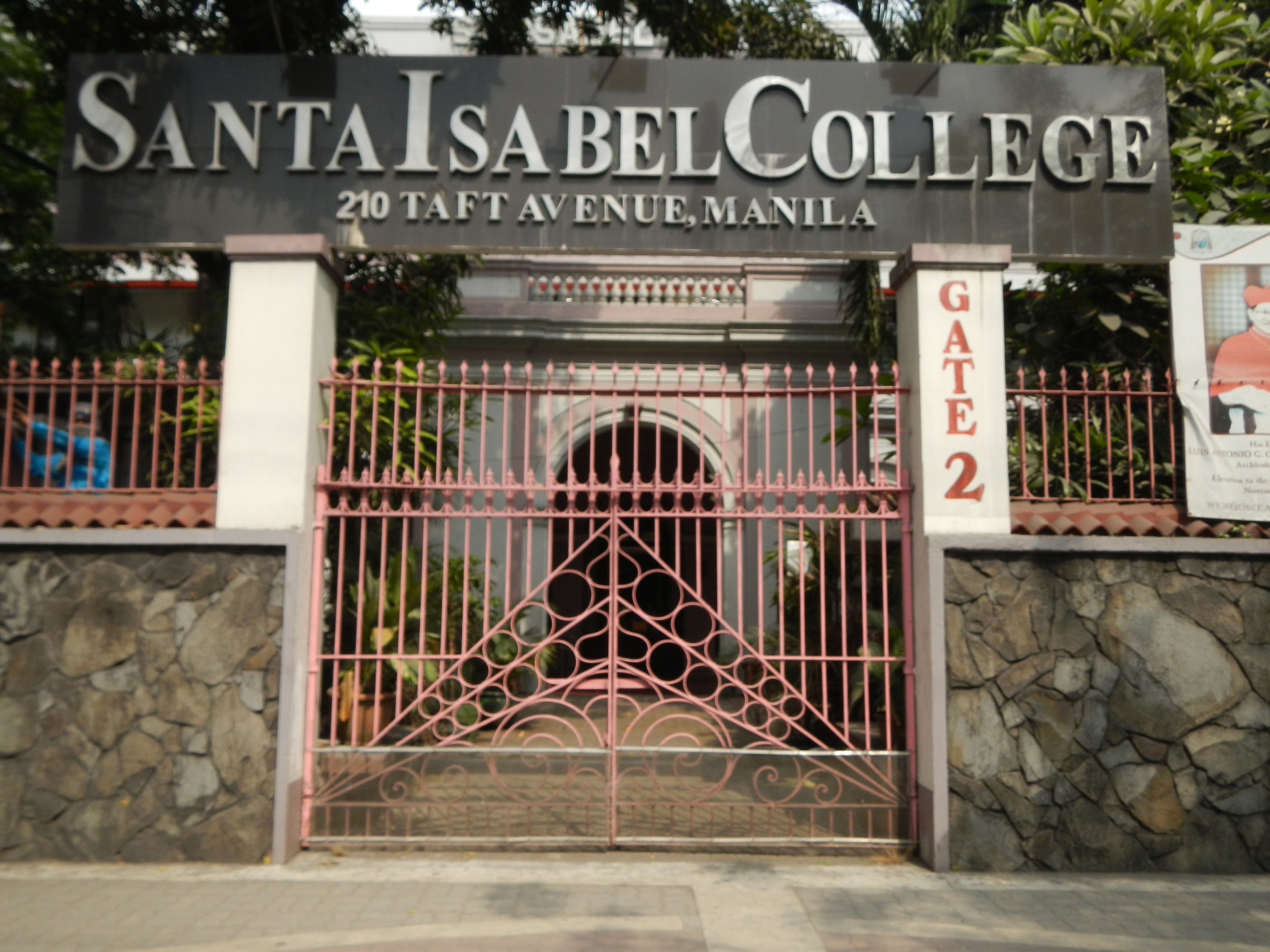
Facade of the 1632 Santa Isabel College Manila

Santa Isabel College has operated for more than three centuries.

- April 6, 1594 – Institution founded as a Charitable Brotherhood
- October 24, 1632 – Institution becomes the Colegio de Santa Isabel beginning its educational history
- May 25, 1636 – Rules and regulations governing the college were drafted
- March 25, 1733 – Philip V of Spain orders the college be called Real Colegio de Santa Isabel (Royal College of Saint Isabel)
- 1852 - Isabella II of Spain has the Daughters of Charity on mission to the Philippines
- July 22, 1862 – Daughters of Charity arrive in the Philippines
- 1866 - Real Colegio de Santa Isabel merges with Colegio de Santa Pontenciana
- August 13, 1933 – A fire destroys almost half of the college
- February 7, 1945 – A fire destroys the college during the Battle for the Liberation of Manila
- September 14, 1947 – A marker is unveiled commemorating the new, English name of the college

Colegio de Santa Isabel was founded on October 24, 1632, with the primary purpose of educating Spanish orphans in this most distant Spanish colony, and is one of the oldest girls schools in the world. In later years, it admitted Spanish Filipina girls as well. In 1733, by a royal decree the name of the college was changed to Real Colegio de Santa Isabel. Records of its establishment can be found at the General Archives of the Indies in Seville, Spain.

On July 22, 1862, fifteen Daughters of Charity of Saint Vincent de Paul arrived in the Philippines from Spain, and in two years took over administration of Real Colegio de Santa Isabel. The college was then in Intramuros until World War II, when it was totally destroyed by shelling and fire in the Battle of Manila. After losing the Colegio, the sisters sought refuge at Saint Rita's College, which was fortunately spared from the ravages of war.

The sisters taught in Saint Rita's College to support themselves, determined to keep alive the name of their own illustrious college. The sisters left no stone unturned until they found a temporary home for its students. It was through the kindness of Vicente Reyes, then parish priest of San Miguel Church, who offered some rooms in the convento so the sisters could resume their apostolate of educating the young. Led by Juana Zabalza, then-Superior of the College, and then-principal, Candida Ocampo (later became the first Filipina Superior of the College), were able to acquire the former Saint Rita's College site at 210 Taft Avenue, Manila.

Some time after the war, the name was changed to Santa Isabel College.

Since 1968, four buildings were added to Santa Isabel. The school auditorium, built in 1953, was modernized. The Sister Catalina Ledesma Mini Recital Hall was constructed from the funds provided by the Sister Catalina Scholarship Foundation.

Just after the Vietnam War, Santa Isabel College opened the Center for Assistance to Displaced Persons. The refugees and boat people from Vietnam, Laos and Cambodia were assisted by the Center under the sisters and staff. The Louise de Marillac Foundation, Inc. caters to the needs of an adopted community in Barangay Paliparan, Dasmariñas, Cavite, and in Barangay 736, Zone 80, Quirino Avenue, Manila.

In 1982, Santa Isabel College celebrated its 350th Foundation Anniversary. After three and a half centuries, Santa Isabel College has expanded its educational programs.

The courses, Bachelor of Science in business administration, Bachelor of Science in accountancy, Bachelor of Arts, Bachelor of elementary/secondary education, and music are still being offered, but the curricula were updated and enriched according to the demands of the times. Its Teacher Certificate Program (TCP) for professionals was opened. The music program was likewise expanded and now has short courses.

The Bachelor of Science in public relations received government recognition in 1981, making Santa Isabel College the first school in the Philippines to have such. Aside from the said offerings, the school's four courses were approved by the government: Bachelor of Science in information technology, Bachelor of Science in information management, Bachelor of Science in office administration, and Bachelor of Arts in human development.

With the opening of the courses, Santa Isabel College admitted more male students, which had precedent as the Music Program had always accepted male students since after World War II.

After the PAASCU visit in February 27–28, 2000, the school was reaccredited for a period of five years, effective April 2002 to April 2007.

In school year 2003-2004, the college underwent sessions on the revision of the institution's vision-mission statement, an integration of the vision-mission statements of the Manila Archdiocesan and Parochial Schools Association (MAPSA) and the St. Louise de Marillac Educational System (SLMES), as well as scenario building and strategic planning. All of these are aimed for continuous growth and improvement, harnessing the capacity for continual transformation.

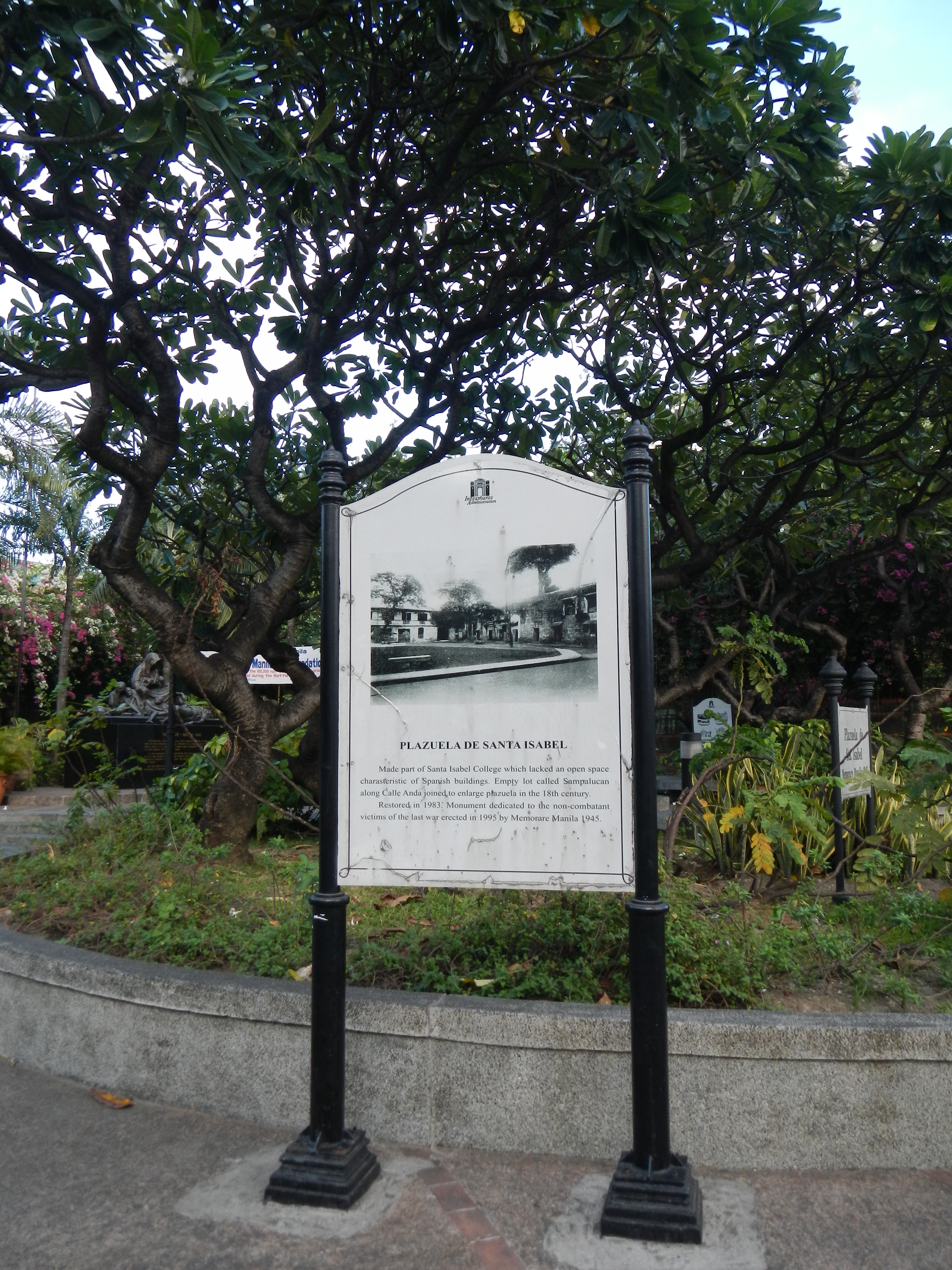
Plazuela de Santa Isabel, Intramuros - part of the former site of Santa Isabel College, Manila

Santa Isabel College undertook intensive curriculum revision, realigning and mapping for more cohesive and relevant offerings. Thus, new programs were conceived: two-year Associate in computer technology, two-year Certificate in hotel and restaurant management, and two-year Certificate in accountancy. The school year 2005-2006 ushered in new programs: Bachelor of Science in hotel and restaurant management and evening classes for working students.

In 2004, the Bachelor of Science in hotel and restaurant management was offered. To comply with the practicum requirements of the course, the Chateau Santa Isabel Practicum Center was built. The practicum center serves as the in-house training ground of the hotel and restaurant management students. It was inaugurated on March 15, 2005, and was opened to the public on May 1, 2005. As part of the reinvention, the internet café was inaugurated and became operational for use of the students and personnel. Eventually, the internet café became part of the facilities of Chateau Santa Isabel Practicum Center which was opened on May 1, 2005.

The Higher Education Department passed the Level 2 PAASCU Accreditation on January 25, 2005, during the Interim Visit. The visit was conducted for Liberal Arts, Education and Business Administration programs.

The Alternative Learning System (ALS) was introduced by the Office of the Community of Extension Services.

The Music Department also celebrated its Diamond Jubilee with an opening concert at the now-demolished Philam Life Theater, and a closing concert at the Cultural Center of the Philippines.

On October 24, 2007, Santa Isabel College marked its 375th Foundation Anniversary. The celebration was highlighted by a stage play entitled "Vincent and Louise in the City". It was performed by select students and faculty at the Santo Cristo del Tesoro Auditorium. A High Mass was also said by Gaudencio B. Rosales, then-Archbishop of Manila, at Manila Cathedral.

Santa Isabel College has an alumni association which meets every month. They hold fund-generating projects to help improve the school plant, give scholarships and help those who are materially deprived. Every year, Manila-based alumni join fellow alumni in the United States and Canada for a grand reunion.

The basic education department has organized a Parent's Council for the whole department. Officers and members are parents and guardians of students from all programs. Parents are organized as partners of the school in educating the young.

== Academic programs offered ==
- Pre-school (Nursery and Kindergarten)
- Elementary (Grade 1 to Grade 6)
- High School (Grade 7 to Grade 12)
- Bachelor of Music with majors in Music Education, Composition, Piano and Voice
- Bachelor of Arts in English
- Bachelor of Elementary Education
- Bachelor of Secondary Education with majors in Religious Education, English and Computer Education
- Bachelor of Science in Accountancy
- Bachelor of Science in Business Administration with majors in Human Resource Management, Marketing Management and Financial Management
- Bachelor of Science in Information Technology
- Bachelor of Science in Hotel and Restaurant Management
- Master of Music
- Master of Arts in Music
- TESDA Short Courses

== College seal ==
The Cross at the center of Santa Isabel College's seal symbolizes Christ, the Center, whose charity urges the institution in its mission of educating the youth. The even arms of the cross stand for the school's freedom from bias in the choice of her students. In between the arms are inscribed four Latin terms, namely: Caritas-Charity, Humilitas-Humility, Sapientia-Knowledge, and Disciplina-Discipline. The school instills in the young, benevolent love, humility, and self-control in relation to themselves, their peers, and specially the less-privileged. The students are given equal opportunities to acquire and interpret knowledge of truth about the realities around and most especially, the reality of God's providence to human beings, through the different programs. These four aspects of the seal are integrated in the context of the student's Christian and human development.

The colors in the seal are maroon and gold. The cross is colored gold, and the letters and lines are maroon. Gold symbolizes the Church dedicated to the cause of Christian Education. Maroon is the symbol of royalty. Santa Isabel College was founded out of the Spanish Queen's unselfish devotion to the welfare of others. She provided free education to the orphaned daughters of the Spanish soldiers and later to deserving Filipino young girls.
