= Universidad de San Ignacio =

University in Manila, Philippines

- Former names: Colegio de Manila (1590–1626); Colegio de San Ignacio (1626–)
- Type: Pontifical, Royal, Private
- Active: 1590–1768
- Founders: Society of Jesus (Fr. Antonio Sedeño, S.J.)
- Religious affiliation: Catholic (Jesuit)
- Location: Manila, Philippines

The Universidad de San Ignacio was a university in the city of Manila which existed during the Spanish colonial era in the Philippines. It was founded in 1590 and it was the first university built by Europeans in East Asia when it was established by Spanish Jesuits headed by Fr. Antonio Sedeño, S.J. The school ceased its existence following the expulsion of the Jesuits in the archipelago in 1768.

== History ==
=== Early history ===
The first Spanish Jesuits in the Philippines, Alonzo Sánchez and Antonio Sedeño, arrived in 1581 as missionaries. They were custodians of the ratio studiorum, the Jesuit system of education developed around 1559. Within a decade of their arrival, the Society, through Fr. Antonio Sedeño, founded the Universidad de San Ignacio in 1590. It was originally conceived as a school to prepare young men for the priesthood. However, it was only in 1595 when the college formally opened wherein Latin grammar, and “cases of conscience” were initially taught to priest and candidates for the priesthood. The support to build the college came from a donation by Capitán Esteban Rodriguez de Figueroa.

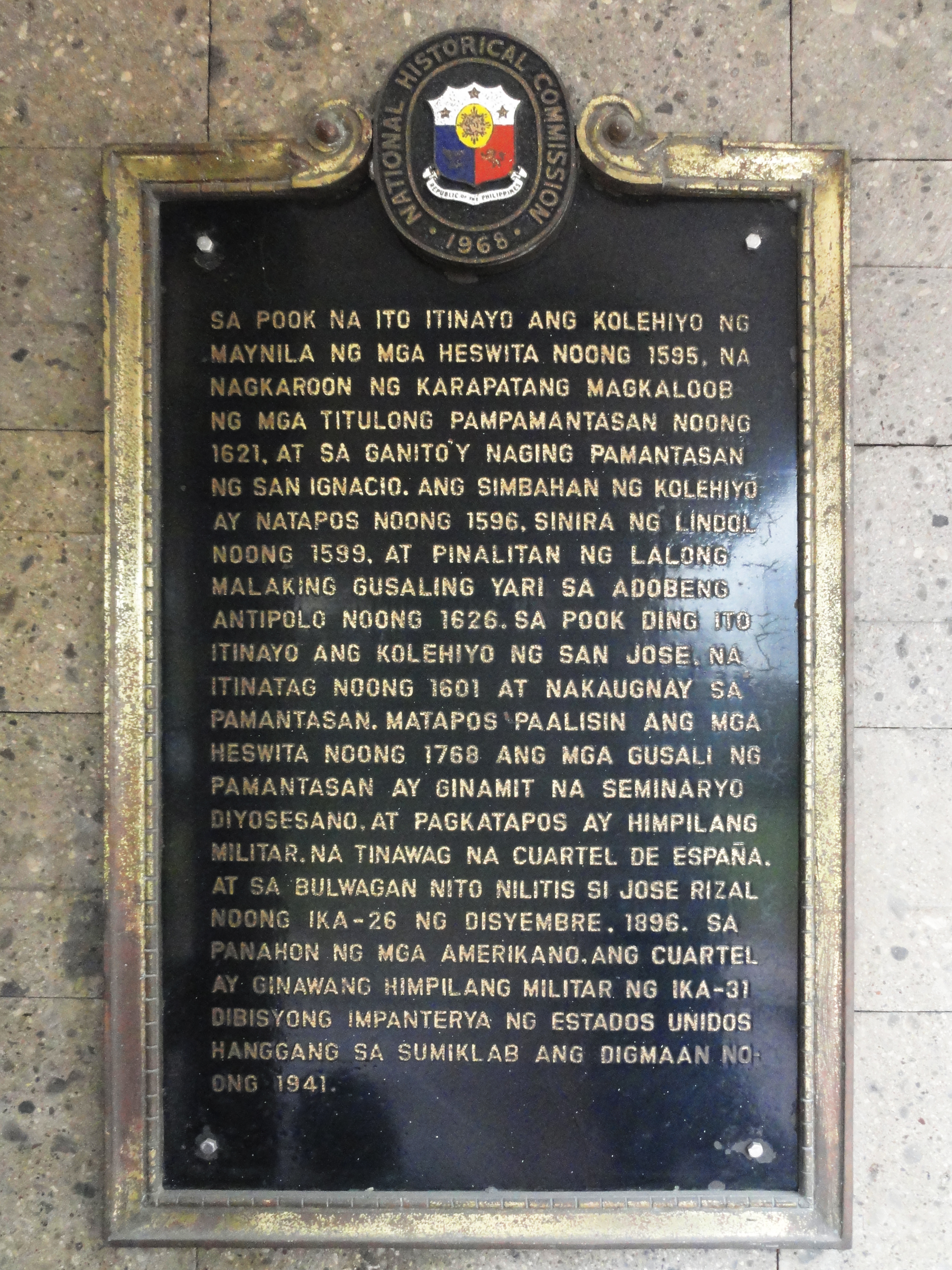
Historical marker installed at the former site of the university

The school was originally located south of the corner of Calle Real de Palacio (now General Luna Street) and Calle Escuela (now Victoria Street) in Intramuros. It was first called Colegio de Manila and was renamed Colegio de San Ignacio in 1626 in memory of Saint Ignatius of Loyola, founder of the Society of Jesus.

In 1601, an extension college called the Colegio de San José was also set up as a residential college for students studying at the Colegio de Manila. Among its rectors was one of the most distinguished personalities during that time, the Czech Jesuit Paul Klein, author of the first Tagalog dictionary as well as the author of the first map of Palau.

The Colegio de Manila was also regularly referred in history books as Colegio Seminario de San Ignacio, Colegio Máximo de San Ignacio, or simply Colegio de San Ignacio, possibly to distinguish it from the Colegio de San José.

In 1621, the Colegio de Manila was authorized by Pope Gregory XV through the Archbishop of Manila to confer degrees in theology and arts. Two years later the authorization was confirmed by Philip IV of Spain and elevated the school into a university, thus making the Universidad de San Ignacio the first royal and pontifical university in the Philippines and in Asia.

=== Closure ===
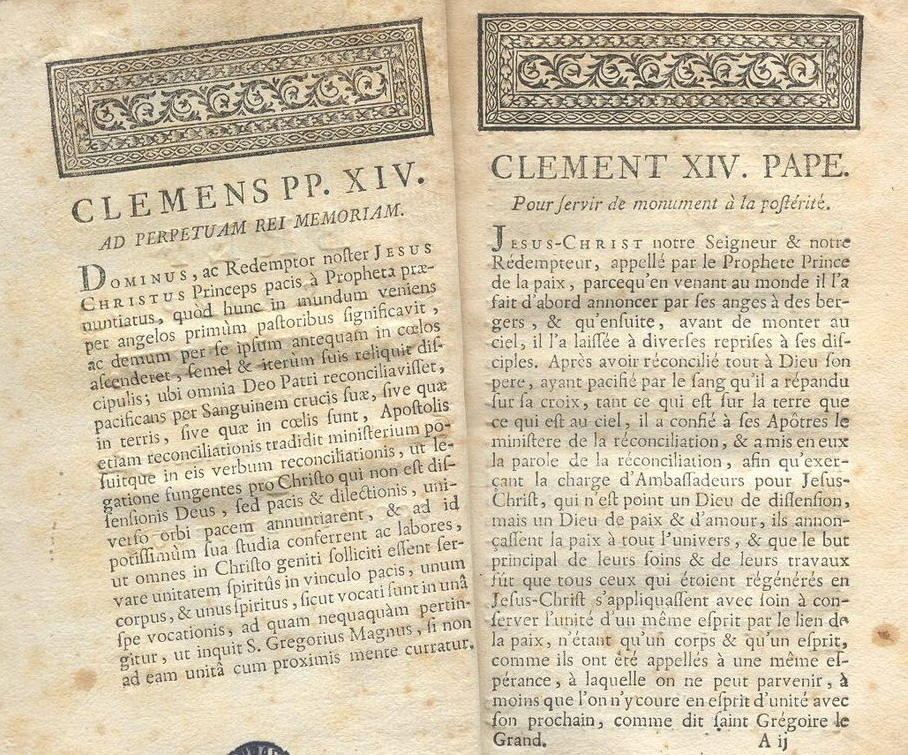
The papal brief, Dominus ac Redemptor, of Pope Clement XIV.

The royal decree leading to the expulsion of the Society of Jesus from Spain and the Spanish Empire reached Manila on May 17, 1768. Between 1769 and 1771, the Jesuits in the Philippines were transported to Spain and from there deported to Italy. The Jesuits surrendered the San Ignacio to Spanish civil authorities in 1768, thus closing the institution.

== Later history ==
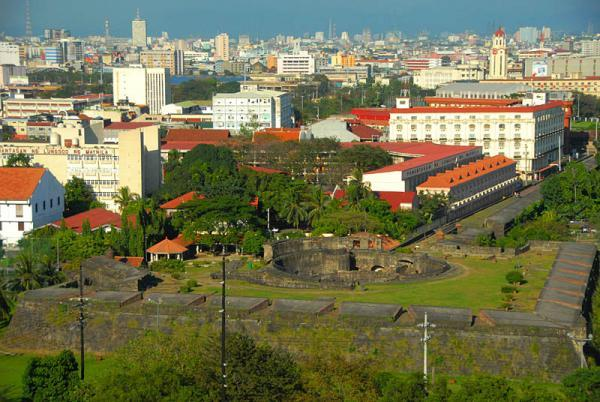
San Ignacio's former location being occupied by the Pamantasan ng Lungsod ng Maynila.

After the expulsion of the Jesuits, the buildings of San Ignacio were transformed into a diocesan seminary. The college was converted into a liberal arts college under a secular administration until it was transferred to the Dominicans in 1875. From 1784 to 1880, it was the site of Real Seminario Conciliar de San Carlos. In 1895, the Universidad de San Ignacio merged with Faculty of Medicine and Pharmacy of the University of Santo Tomas. The Colegio de San José became the San José Seminary of the Ateneo Municipal de Manila. Some of the buildings on the block became the Cuartel de España (Barracks of Spain), the place where José Rizal was tried for sedition on December 26, 1896.

During the American occupation, the buildings and the whole premises served as military headquarters for the 31st Infantry of the United States Army until 1941. Its Quonset Gym held one of the first games of the National Collegiate Athletic Association of the Philippines. In World War II, General Douglas MacArthur held command post here, but the entire area was later destroyed by the military conflict.

In early 1960s, the site was rehabilitated by the city government and a building was constructed along General Luna Street to house the students of Manila High School. In 1965, President Diosdado Macapagal signed into law the Republic Act 4196, which formally established the Pamantasan ng Lungsod ng Maynila (PLM). PLM formally opened its doors on July 17, 1967, occupying the former site of the Universidad de San Ignacio.

== See also ==
- List of Jesuit sites
