= Beta Sigma Omega Phi =

Filipino college fraternity and sorority

- ΒΣΩΦ
- Founded: October 10, 1968; 58 years ago University of Bohol
- Type: Traditional
- Affiliation: Independent
- Status: Active
- Emphasis: Service
- Scope: National
- Motto: Deus Super Omnia "God Above All"
- Chapters: 20+ active
- Nickname: Betans 1968, Betans
- Headquarters: Davao City; Philippines
- Website: betans1968.wordpress.com

Beta Sigma Omega Phi (ΒΣΩΦ, stylized βΣΩΦ, and also known as Betans 1968) is a Philippine college fraternity and sorority. It was founded at University of Bohol on October 10, 1968. It has chartered 72 collegiate chapters throughout the Philippines, mostly on Mindanao.

== History ==
On October 10, 1968, three students from the University of Bohol organized the Beta Sigma Omega Phi, a service fraternity and sorority. Its founders were Frank Paz Jr., Frederick Loor, and Remy Galbizo. Before organizing this fraternity and sorority, the founders fasted for two days and walked 42 kilometers barefooted. They then held the organization's first initiation of twelve neophytes.

The purpose of Beta Sigma Omega Phi was to foster lifetime brotherhood and sisterhood and to create leaders and better citizens. Four years later, President Ferdinand Marcos declared Martial law in the Philippines. During this time, fraternities and sororities were not allowed to initiation members, form chapters, or assemble in the public. A few years later, the remaining members of Beta Sigma Omega Phi decided to revive the fraternity and sorority. By September 23, 1978, they had initiated new members.

For almost twenty years, the fraternity was limited to Tagbilaran City schools and universities, particularly the Alpha chapter of the University of Bohol, Beta chapter at the Philippine Maritime Institute, and Delta chapter at Holy Name University.

=== 1980s ===
Some of the fraternity's members came from the cities and provinces of Mindanao and gradually expanded the fraternity to the island. In the early 1980s, members of Alpha, who were living in Kibawe, Bukidnon, recruited pledges to form chapters at the University of Visayas and Southwestern University schools. At the same time, members living in Butuan City created a chapter at Saint Joseph Institute of Technology. In 1987, Boyet Abay of Holy Name University and Dennis Larrobis of University of Bohol were living in Luponl and established a chapter at MATS College of Technology. Abay and Larrobis went on to established eight more chapters in Davao City.

=== 1990s ===
In 1991, Roy Dano and Gabo Santiago of MATS went to Tacurong and founded chapters at Notre Dame of Tacurong College, Sultan Kudarat Educational Institute, and Sultan Kudarat Polytechnic State College, known today as Sultan Kudarat State University. From Tacurong, the fraternity expanded to most of the universities and colleges in Cotabato City, General Santos, Isulan, Kabacan, Kidapawan, Koronadal, Matalam, Midsayap, and M’lang, In 1993, Jesser Pairat headed up the creation of the Central Mindanao University chapter. Also in 1993, a chapter was chartered at Cagayan de Oro College, under the leadership of Noel Mundo.

=== 2000 - present ===
University of Bohol alumni members returned to their home towns and created collegiate chapters, including Sacred Heart College. Alumni also re-established the defunct at Cagayan de Oro College and chapters at colleges and universities in Balingasag and Jasaan. Chapters were also chartered in Bansalan, Bislig, and Mati. In 2014, the fraternity had established chapters in Cabanatuan, Nueva Ecija, Paniqui, and Tarlac.

Beta Sigma Omega Phi had 72 collegiate chapters in 2023. Members participate in community service projects on campus and in their communities, including planting trees, providing food for those in need, blood drives. Its headquarters is located in Davao City.

== Symbols ==
Beta Sigma Omega Phi's motto is Deus Super Omnia or "God Above All". Its members are called Betans.

== Chapters ==
Chapter	Charter date	Institution	Location	Status	Ref.
Alpha	October 10, 1968	University of Bohol	Tagbilaran City, Bohol		
Beta		PMI Colleges Bohol	Tagbilaran City, Bohol		
Beta		Holy Name University	Tagbilaran City, Bohol		
Gamma	1987	Father Saturnino Urios University	Butuan, Agusan del Norte		
Gamma	1987	Saint Joseph Institute of Technology	Butuan, Agusan del Norte		
Delta	1987	MATS College of Technology	Butuan, Agusan del Norte		
Epsilon	1987	University of Southeastern Philippines	Davao City, Davao del Sur		
Zeta	1991	Sultan Kudarat Educational Institution	Tacurong, Sultan Kudara		
Eta	1991	Notre Dame of Tacurong College	Tacurong, Sultan Kudara		
Theta	1991	Sultan Kudarat State University	Tacurong, Sultan Kudara		
Iota	1993	Cagayan de Oro College	Cagayan de Oro, Misamis Oriental		
Iota	1993	Capitol University	Cagayan de Oro, Misamis Oriental		
Iota	1993	Liceo de Cagayan University	Cagayan de Oro, Misamis Oriental		
Kappa	1993	Bukidnon National School of Home Industries	Maramag, Bukidnon		
Kappa	1993	Central Mindanao University	Maramag, Bukidnon		
Lambda		Philippine Computer College	Maramag, Bukidnon	Inactive	
Mu		King's College of Isulan	Isulan, Sultan Kudarat		
Nu		Sultan Kudarat State University, Isulan Campus	Isulan, Sultan Kudarat		
Xi		Davao Merchant Marine Academy College of Southern Philippines	Buhangin, Davao City		
Omicron		Mindanao Polytechnic College	General Santos, South Cotabato		
Pi		Mindanao State University–General Santos	General Santos, South Cotabato		
Rho		Notre Dame of Dadiangas University	General Santos, South Cotabato		
Sigma		University of Mindanao	Davao City, Davao del Sur		
Tau		AMA Computer College	Davao City, Davao del Sur		
Upsilon		Notre Dame of Marbel University	Koronadal, South Cotabato		
Phi		University of Southern Mindanao	Kabacan, Cotabato		
Ch		Bohol Institute of Technology (now BIT International College)	Bohol		
Ch		Bohol Island State University	Bohol		
Psi		Marbel School of Science and Technology	Koronadal, South Cotabato		
Omega		Holy Cross of Davao College	Davao City, Davao del Sur		
Alpha Alpha		University of the Immaculate Conception	Davao City, Davao del Sur		
Alpha Beta		Bukidnon State University	Malaybalay, Bukidnon		
Alpha Beta		San Isidro College	Malaybalay, Bukidnon		
Alpha Gamma		Southern Mindanao Institute of Technology	Isulan, Sultan Kudarat		
Alpha Delta		Philippine College Foundation	Valencia, Bukidnon		
Alpha Epsilon		STI College, Koronadal	Koronadal, South Cotabato		
Alpha Zeta		Regency Polytechnic College	Koronadal, South Cotabato		
Alpha Eta		AMA Computer College of Marbel	Koronadal, South Cotabato		
Alpha Theta		University of Mindanao, Tagum College	Tagum, Davao del Norte		
Alpha Iota		Samar Institute of Technology (now University of Eastern Philippines)	Island Garden City of Samal, Davao del Norte		
Alpha Kappa		Bukidnon State University (Monkayo, COMVAL Campus)			
Alpha Lambda		St. Peter's College of Balingasag	Balingasag, Misamis Oriental		
Alpha Mu		Holy Cross of Babak College	Island Garden City of Samal, Davao del Norte		
Alpha Nu		University of Southeastern Philippines, Tagum Campus	Tagum, Davao del Norte		
Alpha Xi		Hi-Tech Institute of Technology	General Santos, South Cotabato		
Alpha Omicron		Gensantos Foundation College	General Santos, South Cotabato		
Alpha Pi		Davao Oriental State University	Mati, Davao Oriental		
Alpha Rho		Mati Polytechnic College	Mati, Davao Oriental		
Alpha Sigma		Golden State College	General Santos, South Cotabato		
Alpha Tau	20xx ?	Sacred Heart School College Division	Calamba, Misamis Occidental		
Alpha Upsilon		Notre Dame of Midsayap College	Cotabato, Soccsksargen		
Alpha Phi		Southern Baptist College	M'lang, North Cotabato		
Alpha Chi		St. Ritas College of Balingasag	Balingasag, Misamis Oriental		
Alpha Psi		St. John Paul II College of Davao	Davao City, Davao del Sur		
Alpha Omega		Matalam Polytechnic College	Matalam, Cotabato		
Beta Alpha		Philippine College of Technology	Davao City, Davao del Sur		
Beta Beta		Polytechnic College of Davao del Sur	Digos, Davao del Sur		
Beta Gamma		Misamis Oriental Institute of Science and Technology	Balingasag, Misamis Oriental		
Beta Delta		University of Mindanao, Digos College	Digos, Davao del Sur		
Beta Epsilon		Legacy College of Compostela	Compostela, Davao de Oro		
Beta Zeta		Cor Jesu College	Digos, Davao del Sur		
Beta Eta		University of Southeastern Philippines	Davao City, Davao del Sur		
Beta Theta		Southern Philippines Agri-Business and Marine and Aquatic School of Technology	Digos, Davao del Sur		
Beta Iota		Green Valley College Foundation	Koronadal, South Cotabato		
Beta Kappa		University of Southern Mindanao, Kidapawan City Campus	Kidapawan, Cotabato		
Beta Lambda		De La Salle John Bosco College	Bislig, Surigao del Sur		
Beta Mu		Notra Dame of Cotabato	Cotabato City, Maguindanao del Norte		
Beta Nu		Saint Vincent de Paul College	Bislig, Surigao del Sur		
Beta Xi		Cotabato State University	Cotabato City, Maguindanao del Norte		
Beta Omicron		Northlink Technological College	Panabo, Davao del Norte		
Beta Pi		St. Mary's College of Bansalan	Bansalan, Davao del Sur		
Beta Rho		University of Mindanao, Bansalan College	Bansalan, Davao del Sur		
Beta Sigma		Southern Technological Institute of the Philippines	Bislig, Surigao del Sur		
Beta Tau		Kapalong College of Agriculture, Sciences and Technology	Kapalong, Davao del Norte		
Beta Upsilon		Agro-Industrial Foundation College of the Philippines	Davao City, Davao del Sur		
Beta Phi		Global System Institute of Technology	Bansalan, Davao del Sur		
Beta Chi					
Beta Psi					
Beta Omega		Mindanao University of Science and Technology, Jasaan Campus	Jasaan, Misamis Oriental		

== See also ==
- List of fraternities and sororities in the Philippines
