= Upsilon (disambiguation) =

Upsilon (Υ or υ) is the 20th letter of the Greek alphabet.

Upsilon may also refer to:

- Latin upsilon (Ʊ or ʊ), a Latin letter
- Lake Upsilon
- Upsilon meson (ϒ)

== See also ==
- Near-close near-back rounded vowel, represented as ʊ (lowercase Latin upsilon)
- Ypsilon (disambiguation)
- Ipsilon (disambiguation)
- Upsilon Phi Delta
- Upsilon Phi Sigma
- Upsilon Pi Epsilon
- Upsilon Sigma Phi
