= List of fraternities and sororities in the Philippines =

More than 200 fraternities and sororities are registered in the Philippines. Fraternal organizations were introduced to the Philippines during the era of United States colonialism and were adapted by the Filipinos.

Filipino college fraternities and sororities are similar to the Greek letter organizations in the United States and include male-only fraternities, female-only sororities, and mixed gender groups. These groups are active in academic and community life on and off campus. Members are recruited to these exclusive organizations based on characteristics such as popularity, athleticism, and leadership skills. Greek letter honor societies only recruit students who demonstrate superior academic performance. Membership in Filipino fraternities and sororities continues after college, often helping members secure better jobs and promotions.

Joining Filipino fraternties and sororties includes an initiation process that often includes hazing. There have been hundreds of reported injuries and numerous hazing-related deaths at academic institutions in the Philippines, including Adamson University, De La Salle–College of Saint Benilde, the Maritime Academy of Asia and the Pacific, Philippine College of Criminology, San Beda College, the University of Makati, University of Santo Tomas, the University of the Philippines Diliman, the University of the Philippines Los Baños, and Western Mindanao State University. However, there is also acts of violence or rumbles between various fraternities, often seeking campus dominance, that have also resulted in the deaths of members. Between 1954 and 2019, there were eleven deaths related to fraternities at the University of the Philippines Diliman, six from hazing and five from rubbles. The Congress of the Philippines passed the Anti Hazing Act of 1995 and the Anti Hazing Act of 2018. Some colleges, such as De La Salle University, have banned fraternities and soroties on campus.

The following is a list of some of the fraternities and sororities in the Philippines.

== Explanation of columns ==
- Charter date and range – in the Philippines only
- Scope – International (chapters both in and out of the Philippines), National (chapters across the Philippines), Regional (a few chapters in the same district), and local (one chapter)
- Active chapters – number of active chapters in the Philippines only

== General or community-based fraternal organizations ==
Name	Charter date and range (Note: In the Philippines.)	First Philippines location	Type	Scope	Active Philippines chapters	Ref.
Benevolent and Protective Order of Elks	August 14, 1902	Manila	Fraternal order	International		
Freemasons	1856	Manila	Mason fraternal order	International		
Grand Lodge of the Philippines	December 11, 1912	Ermita, Manila	Masonic Grand Lodge	International		(Note: Members must be men ages 21 or older.)
Independent Order of Odd Fellows	1872	Dumaguete City, Negros Oriental	Fraternal order	International	28	
Job's Daughters International		Olongapo City	Masonic sorority	International	29	(Note: Members are girls aged 10 to 20 who are related to a Mason or are sponsored for membership by a Mason.)
Order of DeMolay	March 23, 1946	Luzon	Masonic fraternity	International		(Note: Members are men ages 12 to 21.)
Philippine Eagles (Fraternal Order of Eagles)	1979	Quezon City	Civic fraternity	National	300+	

== College social fraternities and sororities ==
Name	Symbols	Charter date and range (Note: In the Philippines)	First Philippines location	Type	Scope	Active Philippines chapters	Ref.
Aces and Lilies (a.k.a. Tau Sigma Alpha/Lambda)	ΤΣΑ/Λ		Silliman University	Fraternity and sorority			
Alpha Phi Epsilon	ΑΦΕ	September 28, 1961	Notre Dame University	Fraternity	National	44	
Alpha Sigma Fraternity	ΑΣ	October 10, 1962	University of the Philippines Diliman	Fraternity	Regional	3	
Alpha Rho Omicron	ΑΡΕ	August 5, 1976	Philippine College of Criminology	Fraternity and sorority	Local	1	(Note: Member of the Magic Five fraternity alliance, established in November 1977 at the Philippine College of Criminology.)
Alpha Sigma Phi	ΑΣΦ	September 29, 1959	Central Mindanao University	Fraternity, coed	National	4	(Note: Formed between April 26 and 30, 1972, with the merger of two groups using the same name: one formed in 1959 at the Central Mindanao University and the other formed in 1964 at Silliman University.) (Note: Established ties with the Alpha Sigma Phi of the United States in 1984. On 26 September 2013, Alpha Sigma Phi of the United States withdrew from the agreement, severing ties between the two organizations.)
Alpha Theta Omega	ΑΘΩ	November 27, 1968	Central Mindanao University	Fraternity	National	79	
Beta Rho Omega	ΒΡΩ	1965	University of the Philippines Diliman	Fraternity	National	15	
Beta Sigma	ΒΣ	July 14, 1946	University of the Philippines Manila	Fraternity	International	100+	
Delta Sigma Family	ΔΣ	1975	Philippine College of Criminology	Fraternity and sorority	National		
Delta Sigma Phi	ΔΣΨ	1977	Philippine College of Criminology	Fraternity and sorority	National		
Gamma Epsilon	ΓΕ	August 25, 1963	University of Santo Tomas	Fraternity	National	215	
Gamma Kappa Phi	ΓΚΦ	October 9, 1962	Divine Word College College of Law	Fraternity and sorority			(Note: ΓΚΣ sorority, founded in 1964, merged with ΓΚΦ fraternity in 2005, dropping the name ΓΚΣ.) (Note: SEC number CN 201321651)
Gamma Omicron Delta Sigma	GODS	July 7, 1990	Mabolo, Cebu City, Philippines	Fraternity	National		
Gamma Sigma	ΓΣ	1958	University of the Philippines Los Baños	Fraternity	Local	1	(Note: Also known as the Red Scorpions.)
Gamma Sigma	ΓΣ	1975	University of the Philippines Los Baños	Sorority	Local	1	
Kappa Epsilon	ΚΕ	February 22, 1968	University of the Philippines Diliman	Fraternity	International	26	
Lambda Beta Phi	ΛΒΦ	July 9, 1969	University of Bohol	Fraternity, coed	National	17	
Megalith Nu Sigma Phi	νΣΦ	August 21, 1963	Central Luzon State University	Fraternity	National	135	
Phi Lambda Epsilon	ΦΛΕ	1965	Philippine College of Criminology	Fraternity and sorority			
Phi Omega Sigma	ΦΩΣ	August 24, 1968	Central Mindanao University	Fraternity and sorority	National		(Note: Also known as POSANS. Phi Omega Sigma of the Philippines has no legal or fraternal affiliation with Phi Omega Sigma at the College of Wooster or Phi Omega Sigma Christian fraternity at Missouri State University in the United States.)
Pi Omicron	ΠΟ	December 15, 1963	University of the Philippines Diliman	Fraternity and sorority	National	2 ?	
Sigma Alpha	ΣΑ	1970	University of the Philippines Los Baños	Sorority	Local	1	(Note: This is a social-service organization.)
Sigma Alpha Epsilon	ΣΑΕ	September 9, 1966	Central Mindanao University	Fraternity and sorority	International	49	
Sigma Beta	ΣΒ	February 14, 1932	University of the Philippines Diliman	Sorority	National	4	
Tau Alpha Omega	ΤΑΩ	September 21, 1970	Central Mindanao University	Fraternity	National	36	(Note: The fraternity is also known as the Freeman, due to its name that predated its Greek letter name.)
Tau Gamma Sigma	ΤΓΣ	January 17, 1969	University of the Philippines Diliman	Sorority	Local	1	(Note: Its fraternal counterpart is Tau Gamma Phi.) (Note: Also known as the Triskelions' Grand Sorority.)
Tau Gamma Phi	ΤΓΦ	October 4, 1968	University of the Philippines Diliman	Fraternity	International	367	(Note: Its sister organization is Tau Gamma Sigma.) (Note: Also known as the Triskelions’ Grand Fraternity.)
Tau Omega Mu	ΤΩΜ-FLC	December 17, 1972	University of the Philippines Diliman	Fraternity and ladies' circle	National		
Tau Rho Xi	ΤΡΞ	December 1962	University of the Philippines College of Arts and Sciences	Fraternity	Local	1	
Upsilon Phi Sigma	ΥΦΣ	February 14, 1935	University of the Philippines Los Baños	Fraternity and sorority	National	164	
Upsilon Sigma Phi	ΥΣΦ	November 19, 1918	University of the Philippines Manila	Fraternity	National	2	

== Cultural and religious fraternities and sororities ==
Name	Symbols	Charter date and range (Note: In the Philippines)	First Philippines location	Type	Scope	Active Philippines chapters	Ref.
Brotherhood of the Filipinos	UPBF	May 26, 1956	University of the Philippines Diliman	Bisayà cultural fraternity	Local	1	
Cofradia de Neustra Señora de la Consolacion y Correa		1677	Basilica del Santo Niño	Catholic confraternity	International		
Cofradia de Neustra Señora de la Consolacion y Correa		1677	San Agustin Church	Catholic confraternity	International		
Cofradía de San José		before 1841		Catholic confraternity		0	
Cofradia del Sto. Niño de Cebu			Basilica del Santo Niño	Catholic confraternity	International		
Confraternity of Catholic Saints		October 1, 2003	Cubao, Quezon City	Catholic confraternity, coed			
Confraternity of the Holy Rosary		January 26, 2025	Quezon City	Catholic confraternity	International		
Confraternity of the Immaculate Conception		1978	Intramuros, Manila	Catholic confraternity	International		
Confraternity of the Our Mother of Good Counsel		August 29, 2021	Basilica del Santo Niño	Catholic confraternity	Local	1	
Phi Beta Rho	ΦΒΡ	June 24, 1962	University of the East	Filipino culture confraternity, coed	International		(Note: This US chapter of this group describes itself as "A proud Filipino-American brotherhood united by faith, service, and an enduring bond that transcends borders." One of the confraternity's core values is to "celebrate our Filipino roots with pride, carrying the richness of our culture and the spirit of bayanihan into every community we serve.")
Samahang Ilokano	SI	c. 1946	Manila	Ilocano fraternity and sorority	National	421+	(Note: Members must be of Ilocano lineage or must speak and understand the Ilokano language.)
Sigma Delta Phi	ΣΔΦ	February 24, 1931	University of the Philippines Manila	Drama and fine arts sorority	National	3	(Note: The first chapter in the Philippines was established by Mrs. Adeline C. Stevens, from the mother chapter of Sigma Delta Phi at the University of Michigan.)
United Ilocandia	UI	February 14, 1965	National University	Ilocano civic action fraternity and sorority	International	49	

== Honor and academic societies ==
Name	Symbols	Charter date and range (Note: In the Philippines)	First Philippines location	Emphasis	Type	Scope	Active Philippines chapters	Ref.
Alpha Chiron Society	UPACS	1984	University of the Philippines Los Baños College of Veterinary Medicine	Academics	Fraternity	Local	1	
Mussaenda Honor Sorority	MHS	July 22, 1969	University of the Philippines Los Baños College of Forestry and Natural Resources	Conservation	Sorority	Local	1	(Note: Counterpart of Zeta Beta Rho.)
Sigma Delta Pi	ΣΚΠ		University of the Philippines Diliman	Hispanic	Sorority	International		
Zeta Beta Rho	ΖΒΡ	1949	University of the Philippines Los Baños	Academic excellence	Fraternity	Local	1	(Note: Counterpart of Mussaenda Honor Sorority.)

== Political fraternities and sororities ==
Name	Symbols	Charter date and range (Note: In the Philippines)	First Philippines location	Type	Scope	Active Philippines chapters	Ref.
Katipunan	KKK	July 7, 1892 – March 22, 1897	San Nicolas, Manila	Nationalist secret society	National	0	
Delta Sigma Xi	ΔΣΞ	February 14, 1971	Manuel L. Quezon University	Confraternity, coed	International	151	(Note: Formed as an illegal group to oppose the administration of President Ferdinand Marcos, it later focused on fostering camaraderie and mutual respect within the university community.)
Omega Sigma	ΩΣ	1992	Tarlac State University	Confraternity	Local	1	
Pi Sigma	ΠΣ	August 15, 1972	University of the Philippines Diliman	Socio-political fraternity	National	40+	(Note: Counterpart of Pi Sigma Delta.)
Pi Sigma Delta	ΠΣΔ	January 26, 1975	University of the Philippines Diliman	Socio-political sorority	National		(Note: Counterpart of Pi Sigma.)
Sigma Alpha Nu	ΣΑΝ	1993	University of the Philippines Los Baños	Socio-service and nationalist sorority	National		
Sigma Delta Pi	ΣΚΠ	August 8, 1974	University of the Philippines Baguio	Nationalist sorority	National		
Sigma Kappa Pi (Samahan ng Kabataang Pilipino)	ΣΚΠ	September 1, 1968	University of the Philippines Diliman	Nationalist fraternity			

== Professional fraternities and sororities ==
Name	Symbols	Charter date and range (Note: In the Philippines)	First Philippines location	Emphasis	Type	Scope	Active Philippines chapters	Ref.
Adelfe Enu Crea	AEC	April 2, 1991	University of the Philippines Diliman	Business	Sorority	Local	1	(Note: From from Pan Xenia Ladies' Corps, an auxiliary arm of the Pan Xenia Fraternity.)
Aegis Juris		1979	University of Santo Tomas Faculty of Civil Law	Law	Fraternity	Local	1	
Alpha Phi Beta	ΑΦΒ	1939	University of the Philippines College of Law	Law	Fraternity	Local	1	(Note: Its campus partner is ΡΔΑ.)
Aquila Legis	ALF	1949	Ateneo de Manila Law School	Law	Fraternity	Local	1	
Artists Circle Fraternity	AC	May 22, 1972	University of Philippines College of Fine Arts	Art	Fraternity and sorority	Regional	2	
ASTRVM SCIENTIS	AS	August 14, 1972	University of the Philippines College of Law	Law	Sorority	National	2	
Beta Epsilon	ΒΕ	August 23, 1929	University of the Philippines Diliman	Engineering	Fraternity	Local	1	(Note: Also known as the Brotherhood of Engineers.)
Brotherood of Noble Engineers (a.k.a. Beta Nu Epsilon)	ΒΝΕ	July 6, 2005	University of the Philippines Los Baños	Engineering	Fraternity	Local		
Chi Epsilon	ΧΕ	August 16, 1973	University of the Philippines Los Baños	Engineering	Sorority	Local		(Note: Counterpart of Epsilon Chi fraternity)
Crime Buster	CB	September 21, 1962	Philippine College of Criminology	Criminology	Fraternity and sorority	International		(Note: Member of the Magic Five fraternity alliance, established in November 1977 at the Philippine College of Criminology.)
Delta Epsilon	ΔΕ	1967		Engineering	Fraternity and sorority	National		
EMC² Fraternity		1969	University of the Philippines College of Engineering	Engineering and physical science	Fraternity	Local	1	
Epsilon Chi	ΕΧ	October 2, 1964	University of the Philippines Diliman	Engineering	Social fraternity	Local	2	(Note: Counterpart of Chi Epsilon sorority)
Fraternal Order of Utopia		1964	Ateneo de Manila Law School	Law	Fraternity	Local	1	
Fraternitas Scintilla Legis	FSL	1974	Xavier University – Ateneo de Cagayan	Law	Fraternity	National	5	
Gamma Delta Epsilon	ΓΔΕ	1948	University of Santo Tomas Faculty of Civil Law	Law	Fraternity	Local	1	
Guardians Brotherhood	GBI	April 1976	Parang, Maguindanao del Norte	Military and security sectors	Fraternity	National		
Kappa Kappa	ΚΚ	1948	University of Santo Tomas	Engineering	Fraternity	Local	1	
Lex Talionis Fraternitas	LTF	September 29, 1969	San Beda College of Law	Law	Fraternity	National	2	
Mu Sigma Phi	ΜΣΦ	October 1933	University of the Philippines College of Medicine	Medical	Fraternity	Local	1	(Note: Its campus partner is Mu Sigma Phi sorority.)
Mu Sigma Phi	ΜΣΦ	August 27, 1934	University of the Philippines College of Medicine	Medical	Sorority	National	2	(Note: Its campus partner is Mu Sigma Phi fraternity.)
Pan Xenia	PX	September 23, 1923	University of the Philippines Diliman	Foreign trade and business ethics	Fraternity	International	2	(Note: The fraternity's mother chapter was formed on May 7, 1919, at the University of Washington.)
Phi Beta Epsilon	ΦΒΕ	September 28, 1947	Central Philippine University	Engineering	Fraternity	National	6	
Phi Kappa Mu	ΦΚΜ	August 1933	University of the Philippines College of Medicine	Medical	Fraternity	Local	1	(Note: Its campus partner is ΦΛΔ.)
Portia Sorority		December 5, 1933	University of the Philippines College of Law	Law	Fraternity	Local	1	(Note: Was originally called the Portia Club.)
SCINTILLA JVRIS	SJ	October 14, 1966	University of the Philippines College of Law	Law	Fraternity	National	3 ?	
Sigma Beta	ΣΒ	1950	University of Santo Tomas	Engineering	Fraternity	Local	1	
Sigma Rho	ΣΡ	1938	University of the Philippines College of Law	Law	Fraternity	National	3	(Note: Its collegiate partners are ΔΛΣ/ΛΣΡ)
Societas Mulierum	UPSM	1982	University of the Philippines Los Baños College of Veterinary Medicine	Veterinary	Fraternity	Local	1	(Note: Sister organization to the UP Society of Men.)
Tau Alpha	ΤΑ	June 27, 1932	University of the Philippines Diliman	Engineering	Fraternity	National	2	(Note: Founded from Mu Epsilon which was established in 1931.) (Note: Its collegiate partner is Tau Lambda Alpha sorority.)
Tau Lambda Alpha	ΤΛΑ	June 29, 2012	University of the Philippines Diliman	Engineering and architecture	Sorority	Local	2	(Note: Its campus partner is Tau Alpha fraternity.)
UP Society of Men	UPSM	February 14, 1957	University of the Philippines Los Baños College of Veterinary Medicine	Veterinary	Fraternity	Local	1	(Note: Brother society to the Societas Mulierum.)
Venerable Knight Veterinarians Fraternity	VKV	1959	University of the Philippines Los Baños College of Veterinary Medicine	Veterinary	Fraternity	National	20	(Note: Brother organization to the Venerable Lady Veterinarians Sorority.)
Venerable Lady Veterinarians Sorority	VLV	March 29, 1970	De La Salle Araneta University	Veterinary	Sorority	National	20	(Note: Sister organization to the Venerable Knight Veterinarians Fraternity.)

== Service fraternities and sororities ==
Name	Symbols	Charter date and range (Note: In the Philippines)	First Philippines location	Type	Scope	Active Philippines chapters	Ref.
Alpha Kappa Rho	ΑΚΡ	August 8, 1973	University of Santo Tomas	Fraternity and sorority	International	307	
Alpha Phi Omega	ΑΦΩ	March 2, 1950	Far Eastern University	Fraternity and sorority	International	392	(Note: Members of Alpha Phi Omega created the Scouts Royale Brotherhood at the high school level.) (Note: Affiliated with the international service organization of Alpha Phi Omega, founded in 1925 at Lafayette College in Easton, Pennsylvania, United States.)
Beta Sigma Omega Phi	ΒΣΩΦ	October 10, 1968	University of Bohol	Fraternity and sorority	National	72	
Delta Lambda Sigma	ΔΛΣ	1957	University of the Philippines Los Baños	Sorority	Local	1	
ESPALEKLEK	ESPA	February 3, 1970	University of the Philippines Los Baños	Fraternity	Local	1	
Kappa Phi Sigma	ΚΦΣ	1961	University of the Philippines Los Baños	Socio-civic, conservation society	Local	1	
Scouts Royale Brotherhood	SRB	September 22, 1975	San Sebastian College – Recoletos	High school and college service fraternity and sorority	International	43	(Note: Founded by members of Alpha Phi Omega as a similar organization for high school students, it now includes both high school and college students.)

== See also ==
- College fraternities and sororities
- Cultural interest fraternities and sororities
- Professional fraternities and sororities
