= Mu Sigma Phi =

Mu Sigma Phi may refer to:

- Mu Sigma Phi (literary society), also known as the Clariosophic Society
- Mu Sigma Phi (medical fraternity) in the Philippines
- Mu Sigma Phi (sorority) in the Philippines
