= Phi Kappa Mu =

Filipino medical fraternity

- ΦΚΜ
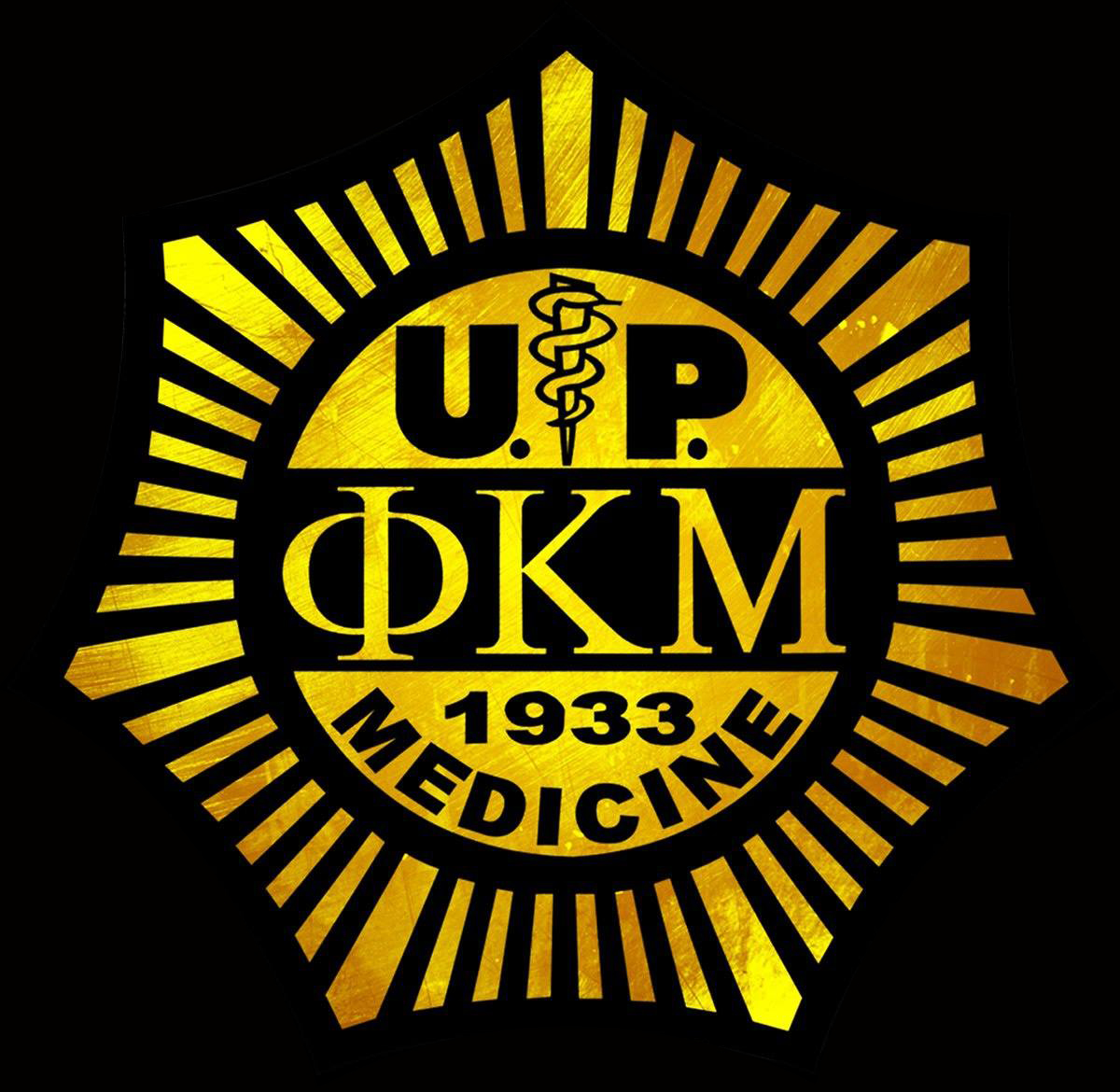
- Founded: August 1933; 93 years ago University of the Philippines
- Type: Professional
- Affiliation: Independent
- Status: Active
- Emphasis: Medicine
- Scope: Local
- Colors: Black and Gold
- Symbol: Rod of Asclepius
- Chapters: 1
- Headquarters: University of the Philippines College of Medicine; Manila, National Capital Region (NCR); Philippines
- Website: www.phikappamu.com

The Phi Kappa Mu (ΦΚΜ) is a medical fraternity based in the University of the Philippines College of Medicine. Its Greek letters stands for Fraternity of the College of Medicine.

Founded in August 1933, it is the oldest medical fraternity in the Philippines. The fraternity was conceived to foster brotherhood, academic excellence, leadership, and service to the community among the medical students of the University of the Philippines.

== History ==
The Phi Kappa Mu Founders

In 1933, Nicanor Padilla Jr., Jose Barcelona, Leopoldo Vergel de Dios, Benito Reverente, and Jesus T. Mendoza, then members of the class of 1936 of the University of the Philippines College of Medicine, initiated the founding of the fraternity. They met with Luis Torres Jr., Jose Barcelona, and Antonio Cañiza of the intern's class; Nicasio Sahagun of the senior's class; and Enrique Garcia and Victor Nañagas of the lower years. By the time the fraternity was formally created, there were 35 charter members.

The name Phi Kappa Mu was conceived by Luis Torres Jr., who, along with Jose Barcelona, was among the first Filipino members of the Phi Kappa Phi Honor Society. The fraternity's constitution and bylaws were created through the efforts of Leopoldo Vergel de Dios. Cesar Villafuerte and Herminio Velarde Jr. composed the fraternity's song in 1939.

Since then, numerous luminaries have emerged from the fraternity's membership, several of whom were conferred by the UP College of Medicine as those who made lasting contributions to the practice of medicine in the Philippines.

In 1996, the PHIKAPPAMU.COM and the Phi Network were created, mobilizing Phi Kappa Mu members around the world. The Phi Kappa Mu Alumni Association in North America was established in 1998. Later, the name was changed to Phi Kappa Mu International. The Phi Kappa Mu Fraternity Permanent Endowment Fund was initiated and is currently the largest endowment fund within the University of the Philippines Medical Alumni Society in America—Permanent Endowment Fund. The fund has contributed to various scholarships and infrastructure projects in the UP College of Medicine.

=== The Phi seal ===
The Phi Kappa Mu seal consists of a seven-cornered golden sunburst with the Greek letters ΦΚΜ across the middle. Above it is the staff of Aesculapius flanked by the letters U and P, which stand for The University of the Philippines. Below the Greek letters is the year the fraternity was founded, 1933, and the name of the College of Medicine.

== Service projects ==
=== Usapang Isipan ===
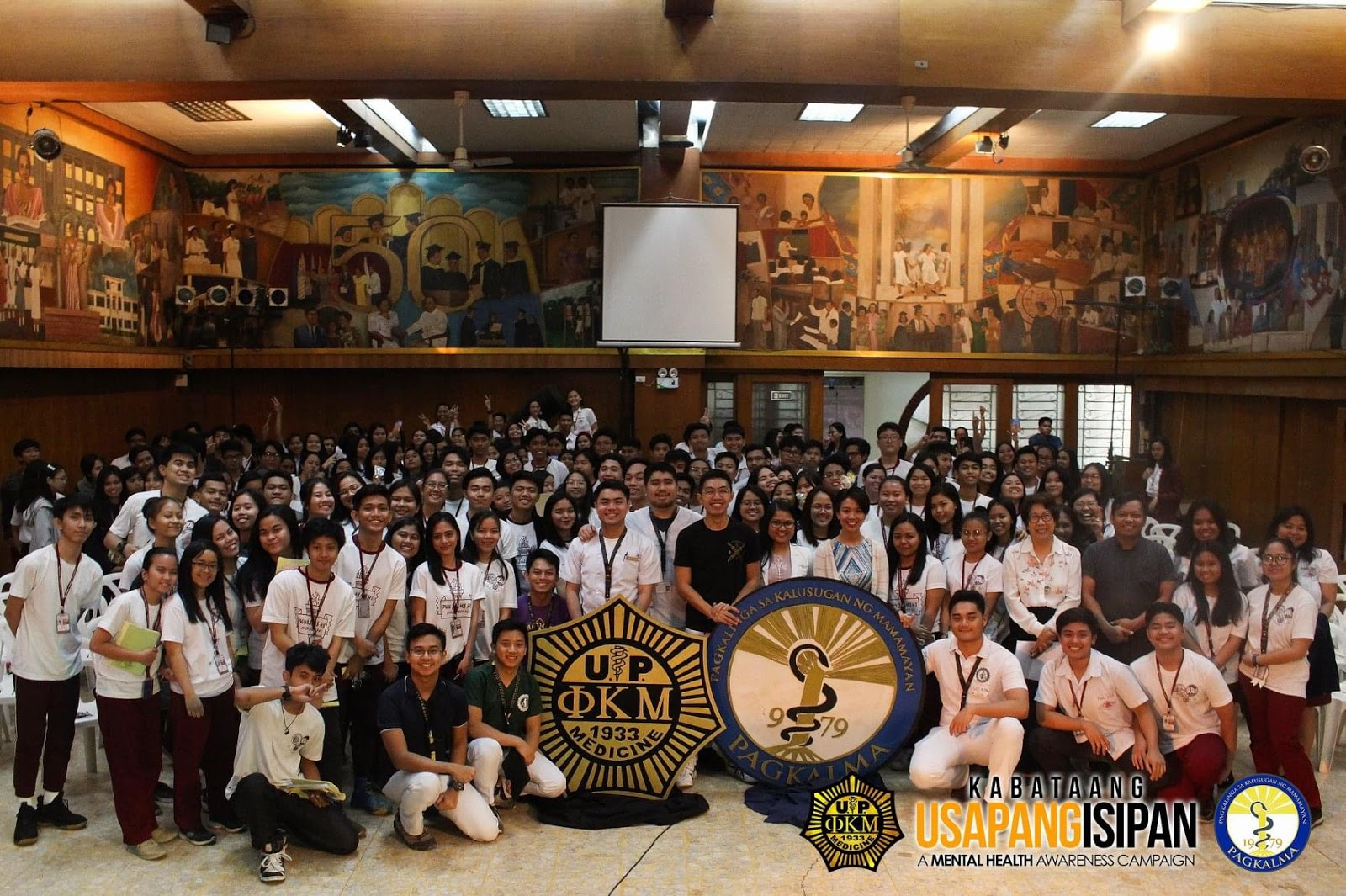
Usapang Isipan

To combat the pervasive stigma on mental health in the country, the Phi Kappa Mu Fraternity launched Usapang Isipan, a series of projects seeking to break the status quo by raising awareness on mental health and engaging various sectors to contribute to improving the mental health outcomes of the Filipino people. Usapang Isipan serves as a platform to increase health-seeking behavior among youth, elevate discussions surrounding mental health, and equip stakeholders to address their communities' mental health concerns.

Since the Usapang Isipan conception in 2016, the project series has hosted mental health forums on depression, burnout, stress, and other mental health concerns of the youth while actively promoting its advocacy of safe spaces through peer counseling and effective coping mechanisms for mental health. In partnership with the Philippine General Hospital Department of Psychiatry and Behavioral Medicine, the project also sought to bring first-hand experiences of mental health issues among young students, community leaders, and the general Filipino people through mental health conferences and training programs.

During the COVID-19 pandemic, the Usapang Isipan Webinar and U and I Stories video series continued to encourage discourse on mental wellness among students and vulnerable citizens suddenly forced into an online setting. In its latest iteration, the mental health project series, with the official endorsement of the Philippine Department of Education, held a mental health research competition open to high school students from across the Philippines. Kabataang Usapang Isipan: Mental Health Research Competition guided high school students as they identified relevant mental health concerns existing in their online environment and presented their devised solutions to expert mental health advocates.

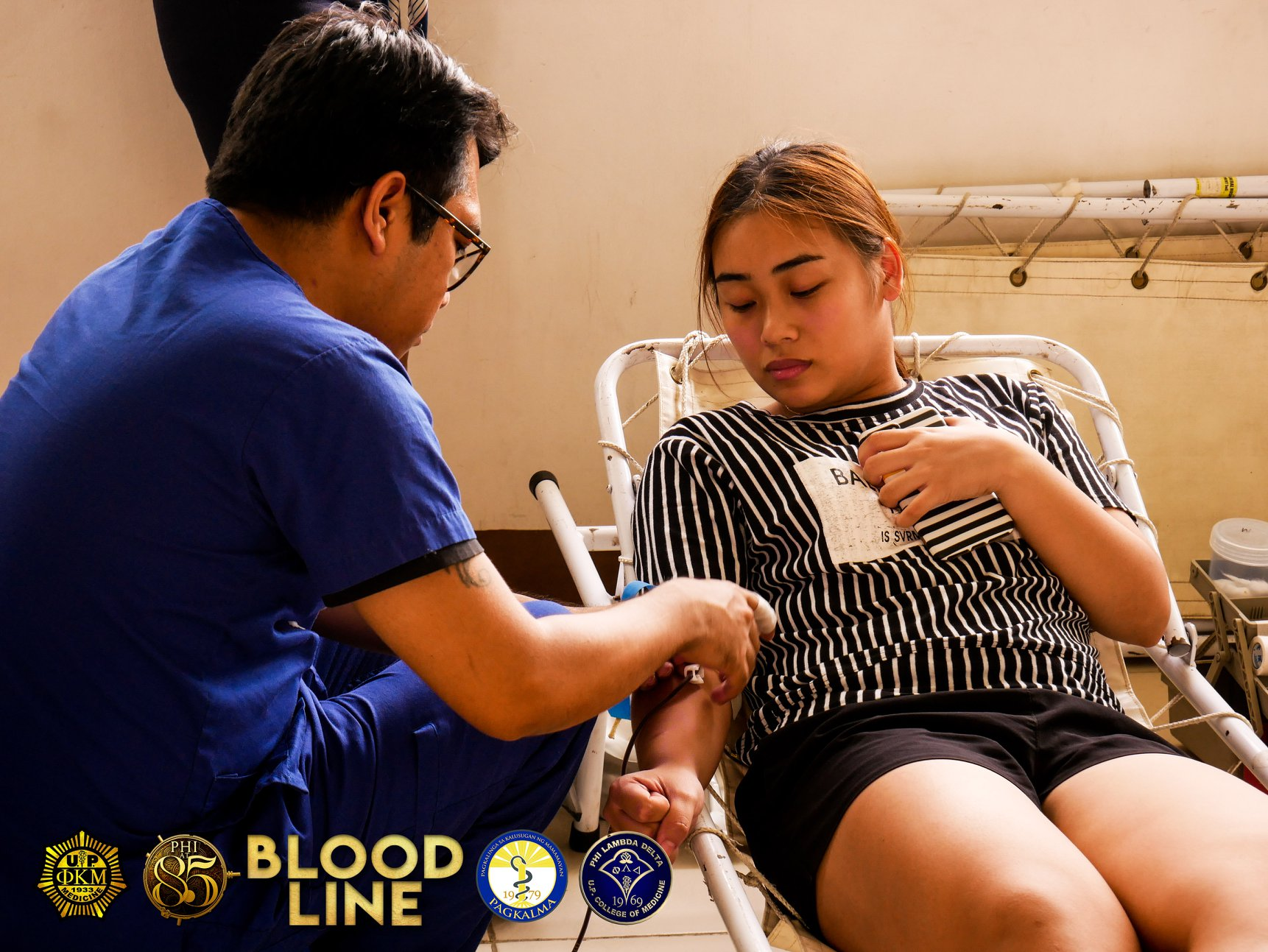
Bloodline

=== Bloodline/Operation Blood Brother ===
Bloodline is a bloodletting activity of the Phi Kappa Mu Fraternity, in partnership with the Phi Lambda Delta Sorority, for the benefit of the Philippine General Hospital blood bank and other local blood banks. Through the years, the fraternity has partnered with medical organizations such as the Philippine Women's University School of Medical Technology and Red Cross, as well as local communities including Trece Martires City, Barangay UP Diliman, and Philippine General Hospital.

=== Surgical missions ===
As expected of a service-oriented medical fraternity, annual surgical missions are offered for Filipino communities that lack the financial capacity. Beginning the summer of 2017, yearly mass circumcision missions are organized in partnership with local communities to provide safe circumcision procedures for the young boys of the community with parental consent. In 2017, 700 boys were given free circumcision from Barangay Cristimar in Antipolo, Barangay Bañdero in Calamba, and other barangays in Luzon. In 2018, an estimated 1000 boys were circumcised during different medical missions within Luzon at no cost while their family members were offered dental, obstetric, and medical check-ups nearby.

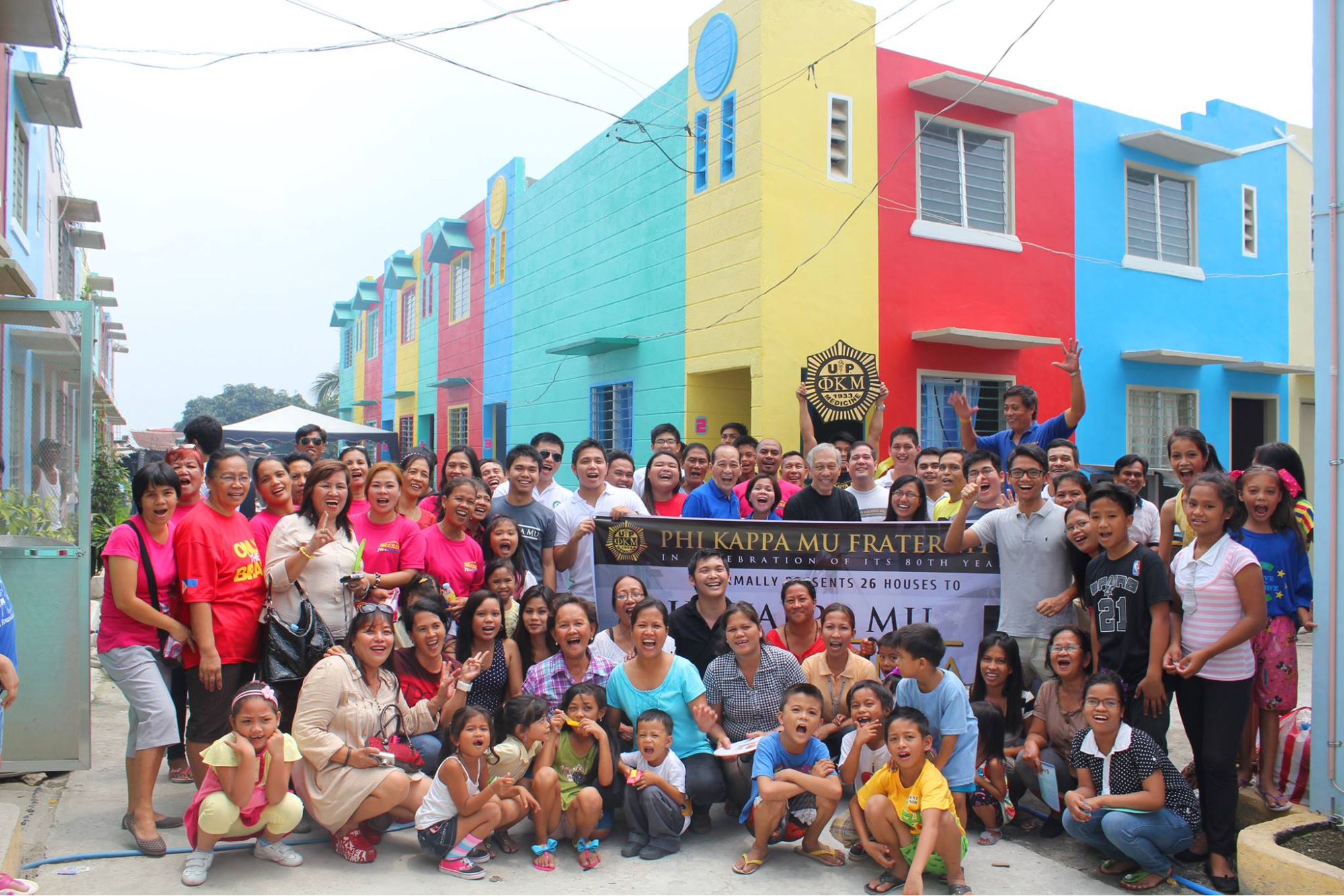
Phi Gawad Kalinga Village

=== Phi Gawad Kalinga Village ===
The Phi Gawad Kalinga Village is a GK-partnership service project of the Phi Kappa Mu Fraternity that provides sustainable and affordable housing to residents of Tandang Sora, Quezon City. In November 2013, 26 new houses were successfully turned over to the residents. Looking to further facilitate the community's growth and development, public health lectures on household injuries such as sprains and brains as well as safe health practices were creatively presented. In 2014, a youth day filled with mentoring, sport coaching, and fun activities was facilitated for the adolescents of the Phi Gawad Kalinga Village. The project has been recognized by the 2013 COKE Barkadahan Grant Program and a beneficiary of the UP class of 1962 during its golden jubilarian years.

=== Phi relief Operations ===
The Phi Relief Operations, entitled UniPhi, is a year-long joint service project of the Phi Kappa Mu Fraternity and Phi Lambda Delta regularly facilitated through their joint service arm, the Pagkalinga sa Kalusugan ng Mamamayan (PagKalMa). Through UniPhi, the fraternity is able to dispatch calls for in-kind and monetary donations from various communities within and beyond UP College of Medicine, mobilizing relief operations to disaster-stricken communities anywhere in the Philippines. UniPhi Relief Operations has raised donations for the typhoon victims ravaged by typhoons such as Typhoon Maring and Typhoon Yolanda in 2013, and Typhoon Glenda in 2014. In 2020, UniPhi Relief Operations raised a total of Php 111,925 in donations for the communities in Cagayan affected by Typhoon Ulysses while also collecting Php 21,167 and numerous essential and medical goods for the victims of Super Typhoon Rolly.

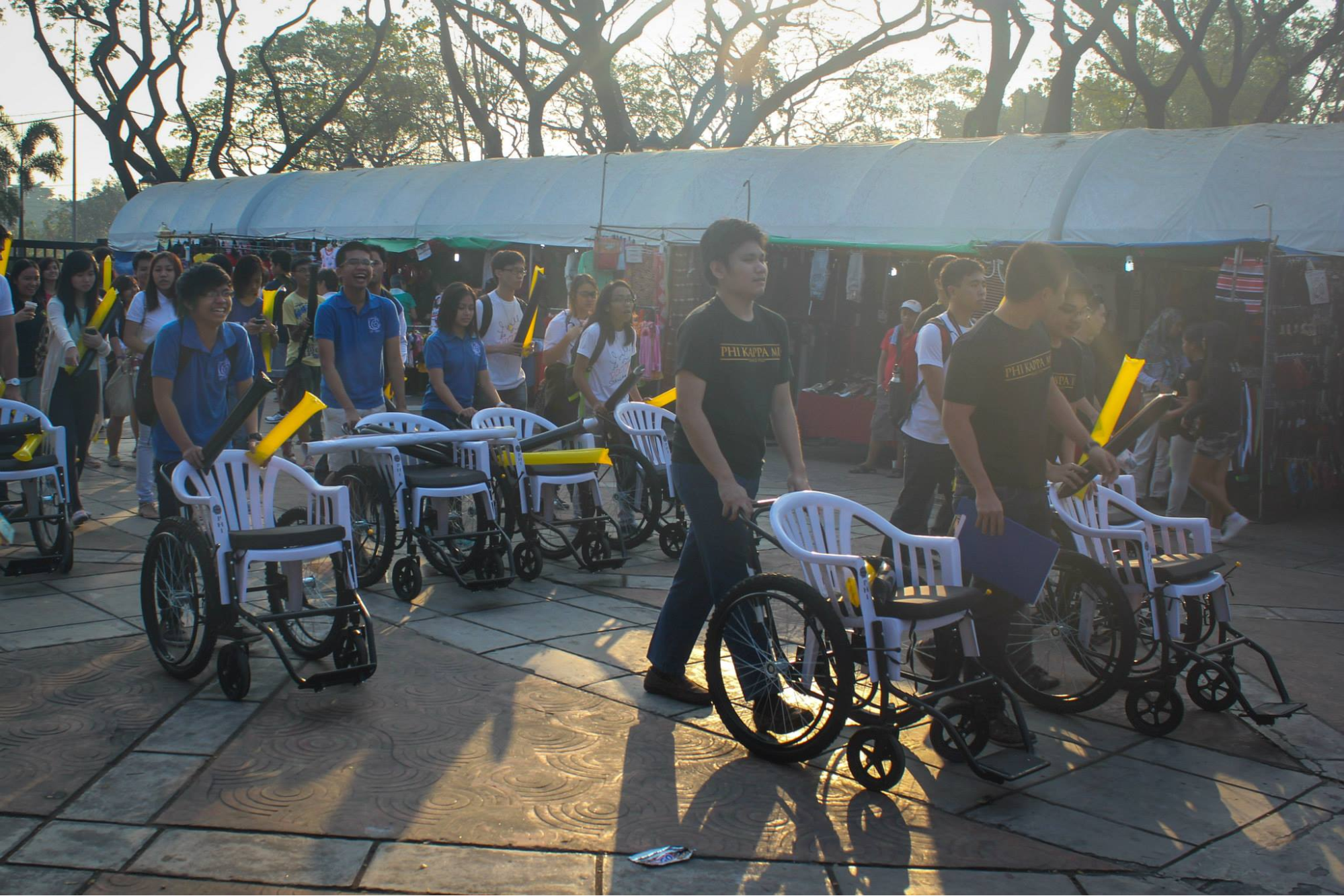
Empowerment Through Mobility

=== Empowerment through Mobility ===
Empowerment Through Mobility is the socio-civic project of the Phi Kappa Mu Fraternity to provide indigent, disabled Filipinos with free, quality wheelchairs. Since 2007, over 6,000 wheelchairs have been provided to the disabled Filipinos nationwide, and in January 2013, the Empowerment Through Mobility Run was organized to mark the project's 7th successful year. The fun run brought together hundreds of runners at the Quirino Grandstand to raise awareness and financial support for Empowerment Through Mobility and other service projects.

=== Diamonds in the Rough ===
On its 75th fraternal year, the Phi Kappa Mu Fraternity launched "Diamonds in the Rough: The National Search for Outstanding Young Doctors in the Community Setting," which aimed to celebrate these unsung heroes who devoted their lives to selflessly serve neglected communities in the Philippines. Diamonds in the Rough selected one awardee each from Luzon, Visayas, and Mindanao, awarding each of them with Php 100,000 and an additional Php 100,000 for their community's sustainable projects. The three awardees were Dr. Vietrez David-Abella from Catanduanes, Dr. Mennie Cabacang from Eastern Samar, and Dr. Afdal Kunting from Zamboanga.

== Notable members ==
Name	Φ Class	Notability	Reference
Ramon F. Abarquez Jr.	1948	cardiologist, developer of the dynamic exercise ECG test	
Benjamin D. Adapon	1953	pioneering neuroradiologist in the Philippines	
Brod Manuel Baustista. Agulto	1969	chancellor, University of the Philippines - Manila; ophthalmologist	
Abundio A. Balgos	1976	The Outstanding Young Scientist awardee and pulmonary specialist	
Jun Y. Belizario Jr.	1981	Ten Outstanding Young Scientist award; dean and centre director, College of Public Health, University of the Philippines Manila	
Guillermo Damian	1948	specialist in rehabilitation medicine, founder of the College of Allied Medical Professions of the University of the Philippines	
Carlo Diasnes	1993	medical doctor and Congressman, Lone District of Batanes	
Felipe Estrella	1950	former Secretary of Department of Health	
Francisco Perfecto Flores	1981	programme management officer, WHO Southeast Asia Regional Office; recipient, World Health Organization Director-General Reward for Excellence	
Tet Garcia	1934	former Secretary of Department of Health Philippines	
Quintin Gomez	1940	pioneer anesthesiologist	
Teodoro Javier Herbosa	1979	trauma surgeon; professor and former executive vice president, University of the Philippines	
Florentino B. Herrera	1937	former dean of College of Medicine, University of Philippines Manila; namesake of medical library	
Jesus Lava	1933	secretary general of the first Communist Party of the Philippines, Hukbalahap	
Augusto Litonjua	1952	endocrinologist, The Outstanding Young Men of the Philippines 1962 awardee	
Luis M. Mabilangan	1947	pediatric cardiologist	
Jesus T. Mendoza	1933	Brigadier General and former Surgeon General, Armed Forces of the Philippines	
Enrique Ona	1957	surgeon, professor, Secretary Department of Health	
Edgardo Ortiz	1972	The Outstanding Young Men of the Philippines awardee for medicine	
Vinson B. Pineda	1958	"father of Philippine dermatology"	
Ricardo Jose D. Quintos II	1986	The Outstanding Young Men of the Philippines 2003; Ten Outstanding Young Scientist awardee	
Alfredo T. Ramirez	1956	The Outstanding Young Men of the Philippines 1973, dean of the University of the Philippines College of Medicine	
Jose Jonas Del Rosario	1986	The Outstanding Young Men of the Philippines 2004, Philippine Heart Association Outstanding Scientist 2008	
Luis F. Torres Jr.	1933	father of modern urology in the Philippines	

== See also ==
- List of fraternities and sororities in the Philippines
