= Alpha Sigma Phi (Philippines) =

Filipino collegiate service fraternity

- ΑΣΦ
- Founded: September 29, 1959; 67 years ago Central Mindanao University
- Type: Traditional
- Affiliation: Independent
- Status: Active
- Emphasis: Service, Social
- Scope: Philippines
- Motto: Causa Latet Vis Est Notissima "The cause is hidden, the results well-known"
- Colors: Cardinal and Stone
- Symbol: Phoenix
- Flower: Cardinal Rose and Yellow Tea Rose
- Chapters: 4 active, 100+ total
- Headquarters: 1845 Mongcopa Drive, Orchids, Daro, Dumaguete City, Negros Oriental; Philippines
- Website: aspphil.wordpress.com

Alpha Sigma Phi Philippines, Inc. (ΑΣΦ, commonly known as Alphans) is a co-ed college service fraternity with 4 active undergraduate chapters. Alpha Sigma Phi Philippines was formed from the merger of two groups with the same name.

== History ==
=== Gregorio Araneta University Foundation ===
The first Alpha Sigma Phi was formed in 1952 at Gregorio Araneta University Foundation in Caloocan City. Little is known about this group, except that one of its members was Bobby Ledesma, a television host prominent in the 1970s. They emerged when conflicts arose between their members and Alphans who studied at GAUF. The groups remained separate organizations. No record exists to show that this group was invited to the national convention in 1972. A separate group of students affiliated with ASP Philippines is now known as the Alpha Nu Chapter.

=== Central Mindanao University ===
This group was organized in 1959 at the Central Mindanao University, Musuan, in Bukidnon by Tomas Gavarra, with the assistance of Ramon del Carmen as Faculty Adviser. This group used the name Agricultural Students of the Philippines, and its acronym ASP was represented by the Greek letters Alpha Sigma Phi.

Some of its members organized chapters in other schools. A chapter was established at Rafael Palma College in Tagbilaran City, now University of Bohol. This group, known as the Theta chapter played a role in developing ties with the Silliman group, which eventually gave impetus to the formation of a national organization.

=== University of the East Ramon Magsaysay ===
This group was established at the University of the East Ramon Magsaysay Memorial Medical Center in Santa Mesa, Manila in 1959. This group claims to be the oldest fraternity of the University Medical Center. No information describes the origins of its name. No record shows that it was invited to the first national convention in 1972.

=== Silliman University ===
The chapter was organized by Manuel Momongan at Stillman University in Dumaguete City in 1965. The group took the name Alpha Sigma Phi. No record shows that its organization was with the knowledge and authorization of ASP USA. It appears that the group appropriated the symbols of ASP USA. This group served as the convenor of the first national convention in 1972 at Silliman University.

=== Merger ===
Some of these groups grew and organized chapters in other colleges. Their respective members met and interacted. In 1972, at Silliman University, the first national convention was held, and the first set of national officers was elected. Only chapters originating from SU and CMU were represented in that gathering. Greek-letter names were assigned to existing chapters. Beginning in 1972, the national organization met in national conventions, leadership conferences, regional conclaves, chapter and association meetings, spreading the reach and scope of Alpha Sigma Phi Philippines across the world.

During the 1978 convention in Davao City, the Greek-letter names of the chapters were updated and approved. In 1980, the national organization was registered with the Securities and Exchange Commission using the name “Alpha Sigma Phi – Philippines, International Collegiate Service Organization, Inc.”

In 1984, Alpha Sigma Phi of the Philippines entered into a "Heads of Agreement" outlining a relationship between the two countries. This agreement outlined mechanisms by which the groups would share information, assist in solving mutual problems. It established the "International Council of Alpha Sigma Phi". Both groups shared publications such as the Tomahawk and chapter operations manuals, and the contact between the two organizations developed.

However, the recommendation of the US Grand Council of Alpha Sigma Phi Fraternity were that the 2008 Grand Chapter would nullify the 1984 Heads of Agreement between the two over issues with hazing, that the national staff of the US chapter inform the Filipino chapter of this nullification and that it be directed to cease use of the group's marks and symbols in accordance with US trademark law. The 2008 Grand Chapter Delegates approved the motion to dissolve the 1984 Heads of Agreement between the two. In 2010, the "International Council of Alpha Sigma Phi" was revived by both fraternities, and linkages between the two were established. Through frequent exchange visits by both parties, they agreed to reaffiliate.

On November 14, 2013, the US ASP Grand Council restated its withdrawal from the Heads of Agreement signed in 1984, severing formal ties between the two organizations. US ASP retained all rights to intellectual property, marks, and symbols associated with the fraternity.

== Symbols ==
Alpha Sigma Phi's motto is Causa Latet Vis Est Notissima or "The cause is hidden, the results well-known". The fraternity's colors are cardinal and stone. Its symbol is the phoenix. Its flowers are the cardinal rose and the yellow tea rose.

== Chapters ==
=== Collegiate chapters ===
Following is an incomplete list of chapters of Alpha Sigma Phi in the Philippines.

Chapter	Charter date and range	Institution	Location	Status	Ref.
Alpha	1959	Central Mindanao University	Musuan, Bukidnon, Philippines	Active	(Note: Originally called the Agricultural Students of the Philippines.)
Beta	1964	Silliman University	Dumaguete, Negros Oriental, Philippines	Active	
Theta		University of Boho	Tagbilaran, Bohol, Philippines		
Lambda		University of Southern Mindanao	Cotabato, Soccsksargen, Philippines		
Alpha Nu		Gregorio Araneta University Foundation	Malabon, Metro Manila, Philippines		
Gamma Rho		Philippine Christian University	Manila, Philippines	Active	
Delta Epsilon		University of Southeastern Philippines Mindanao Campus	Davao City, Davao del Sur, Philippines	Active	

=== Alumni associations ===
Chapter	Location	Status	Ref.
Davao City Alumni Association	Davao City, Davao Region, Philippines	Active	
General Santos City Alumni Association	General Santos, Soccsksargen, Philippines	Active	
Koronadal City Alumni Association	Koronadal, South Cotabato, Philippines	Active	
Kidapawan City Alumni Association	Kidapawan, Cotabato, Philippines	Active	
Cotabato City Alumni Association	Cotabato City, Bangsamoro Autonomous Region in Muslim Mindanao, Philippines	Active	

== See also ==
- Alpha Sigma Phi
- List of fraternities and sororities in the Philippines
