= Ypsilon (disambiguation) =

Ypsilon (Υ or υ) is another name for upsilon, the 20th letter of the Greek alphabet.

The spelling Ypsilon may also refer to:

- Lancia Ypsilon, a car
- Ypsilon (bridge), a bridge in Norway
- Ypsilon, Kyrgia, Doxato, Drama, Greece; a village
- Ypsilon Mountain, a mountain in Colorado, USA
- Ypsilon (Scheme implementation), a software implementation

== See also ==
- Ipsilon (disambiguation)
- Upsilon (disambiguation)
