= Lambda Beta Phi =

Filipino college fraternity

- ΛΒΦ
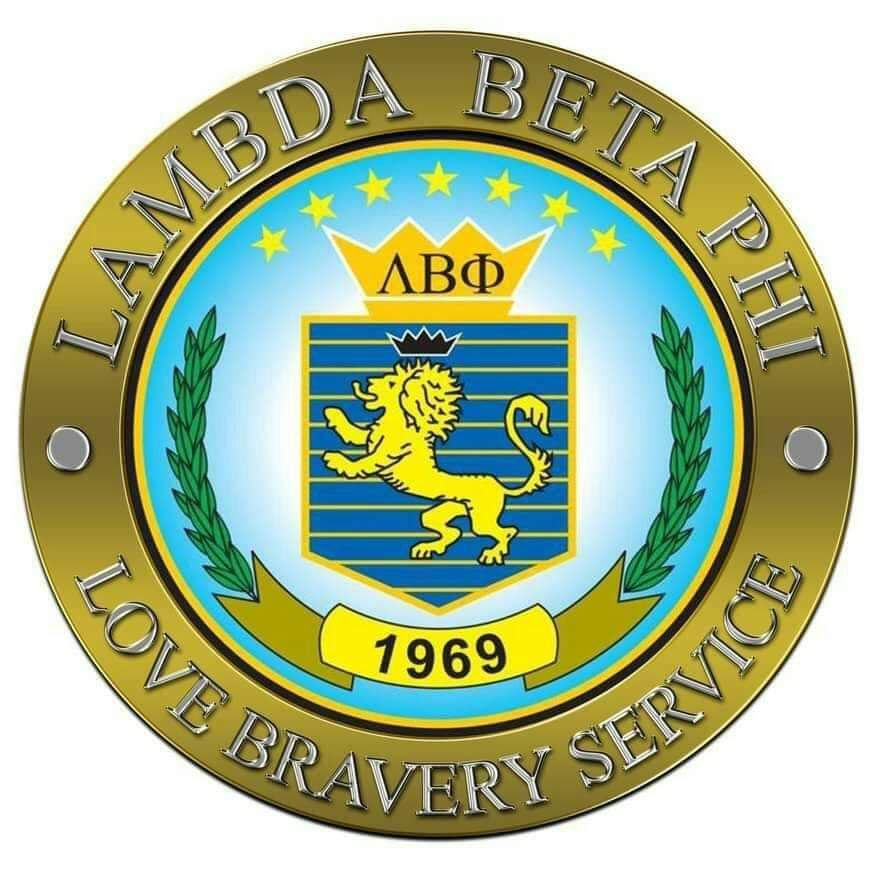
- Founded: July 9, 1969; 57 years ago University of Bohol
- Type: Traditional
- Affiliation: Independent
- Status: Active
- Emphasis: Social
- Scope: National (PH)
- Motto: "Fraternity that would set a high standard of Academic excellence and a Society respected"
- Pillars: Love, Bravery, Service
- Colors: Gold and Blue
- Chapters: 17
- Nickname: Lambdans
- Headquarters: University of Bohol; Tagbilaran City, Bohol; Philippines

The Lambda Beta Phi Fraternity & Sorority (LAMBDANS) is a fraternity established in the Philippines in July 1969. The co-educational organization has expanded to several colleges and universities in that country.

== History ==
Seven college students formed the Lambda Beta Phi fraternity at the University of Bohol in Tagbilaran City, Bohol, Philippines on July 9, 1969. Their objective was to establish a fraternity that would set a high standard of academic excellence and a society respected on the campus. It was among the first Philippine fraternities born in the University of Bohol campus and one of the few in the Philippines at the time.

The founders were Tito Abucejo, Arthur Arengo, Cenocito Budlao, Efraim Castro, Desiderio Cloribel, Rodolfo Haman, Leopoldo Mercado.

Cloribel served as the first Supreme Grand or president. Cloribel and Castro, a nephew of the Dean of Student Affairs, secured university recognition of the fraternity in 1970. In 1970, a companion sorority of the same name was established at the Divine World College (DWC) in Tagbilaran City in 1970.

== Symbols ==
Lambda Beta Phi's cornerstone or pillars are Love, Bravery, and Loyalty, represented by the Greek letters Lambda Beta Phi. The group's motto is ''Fraternity that would set a high standard of Academic excellence and a Society respected''. Its song is "I Understand". Its colors are gold and blue. Its handshake signifies help in times of need and danger.

Early members ritualistically marked via branding their left hands to herald defiance of pain and to show they were one and united - distinct from the others, enduring "the pain to iron out equality among them". In addition, four-cornered dots were tattooed above the brand to symbolize equality and a high sense of responsibility.

== Foundation ==
The "Lambda Beta Phi Fraternity & Sorority International Foundation Inc. is located at 0128 Maria Clara Street Tagbilaran, Bohol, 6300 Philippines.

== Chapters ==
Chapter	Charter date and range	Institution	Location	Status	Ref.
Boho	July 9, 1969	University of Bohol	Tagbilaran, Bohol, Philippines		
		University of Science and Technology of Southern Philippines			
Divine World	1970	Divine World College of Tagbilaran (now Holy Name University)	Tagbilaran, Bohol, Philippines		
Manila			Manila, Philippines		
Cebu City			Cebu City, Cebu, Philippines		
Bacolod City			Bacolod, Negros Occidental, Philippines		
Batangas City			Batangas City, Batangas, Philippines		
Iligan City			Iligan, Lanao del Norte, Philippines		
Butuan City			Butuan, Agusan del Norte, Philippines		
Cagayan de Oro City			Cagayan de Oro, Misamis Orienta, Philippines		
Davao City			Davao City, Davao del Sur, Philippines		
Tagoloan			Tagoloan, Misamis Oriental, Philippines		
Jasaan			Jasaan, Misamis Orienta, Philippines		
Balingasag			Balingasag, Misamis Orienta, Philippines		
Salay			Salay, Misamis Oriental, Philippines		
Gingoog			Gingoog, Misamis Oriental, Philippines		
Camiguin		Camiguin Polytechnic State College	Mambajao, Camiguin, Philippines		
Oroquieta City			Oroquieta City, Misamis Occidental, Philippines		

== Notable members ==
Lambda Beta Phi members have become lawyers, academics, soldiers, policemen, and even politicians. It also has members occupying different key positions in the government and has members residing in the United States and other parts of the globe.

== See also ==
- List of fraternities and sororities in the Philippines
