= UP Alpha Sigma =

Filipino college fraternity

Alpha Sigma
- ΑΣ
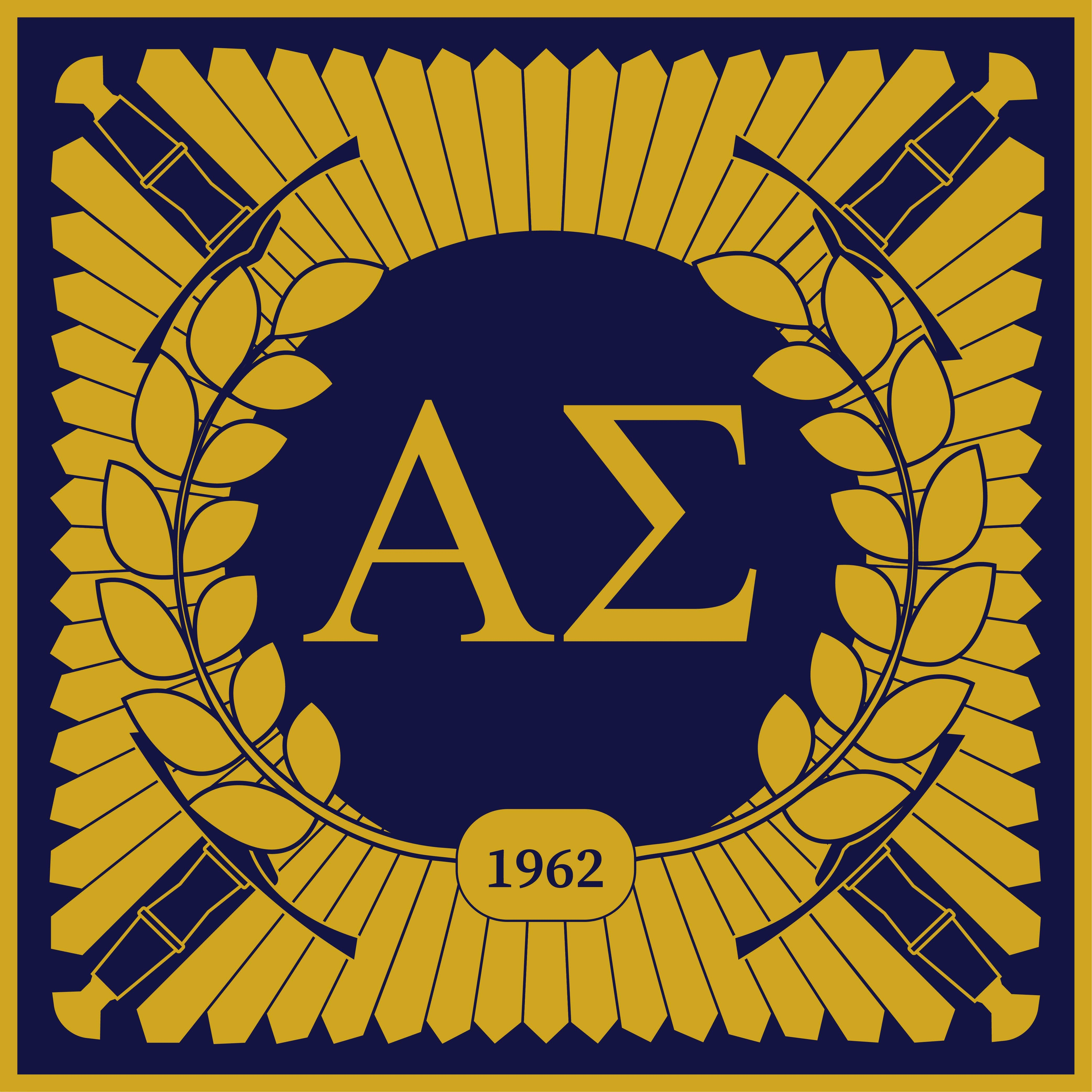
- Founded: October 10, 1962; 64 years ago University of the Philippines Diliman
- Type: Traditional
- Affiliation: Independent
- Status: Active
- Scope: National
- Motto: "Truth–Reason–Justice"
- Pillars: Nationalism, Academic Excellence, Leadership, and Physical Development
- Slogan: "In all endeavors, the mark of excellence."
- Colors: Blue Gold
- Chapters: 3
- Nickname: Masig
- Headquarters: Philippines
- Website: upalphasigma.org

The UP Alpha Sigma Fraternity (ΑΣ), also known as Alay Sa Sambayanan, or Masig, is a Filipino college fraternity. It was founded in 1962 at the University of the Philippines Diliman in Quezon City, Philippines.

== History ==
The UP Alpha Sigma Fraternity was founded at the University of the Philippines Diliman in Quezon City on October 10, 1962. The fraternity was established in protest to the destructive behavior of many fraternities, instead seeking to be an advocate for academics. Its emphasis is humanitarianism and service to its country.

The fraternity was accredited by authorities of the University of the Philippines in September 1963. A second chapter was established the University of the Philippines Los Baños in 1964, followed by the University of the Philippines Manila in 1987.

== Symbols ==
Initially, the Greek letters "ΑΣ" stood for "Academic Supremacy in the Arts and Sciences," which evolved into "Advocates of Scholarship" when the fraternity was accredited in 1963. Later, the meaning was redefined as Alay sa Sambayanan or "Offering to the People.", reflecting the fraternity's broader mission and civic engagement.

The fraternity's motto is "Truth–Reason–Justice". Its slogan is "In all endeavors, the mark of excellence." Its pillars are nationalism, academic excellence, leadership, and physical development.

Alpha Sigma Fraternity's colors are blue, which symbolizes truth and loyalty, and gold, which represents excellence and warm-heartedness. Members of the fraternity are known as Masig.

== Chapters ==
Chapter	Charter date	Institution	Location	Status	Ref.
Diliman	October 10, 1962	University of the Philippines Diliman	Quezon City, Metro Manila, Philippines	Active	
Los Baños	October 10, 1964	University of the Philippines Los Baños	Los Baños, Laguna, Philippines	Active	
Manila	1987	University of the Philippines Manila	Manila, Philippines	Active	

== Activities ==
The Toy For Totoy is an annual charitable outreach project organised by the University of the Philippines Alpha Sigma Fraternity. The drive is held each Christmas season and serves as the fraternity's signature service event, intended to bring holiday cheer to children in underserved communities while reinforcing their foundational pillars of nationalism, academic excellence, leadership, and physical development. The event was originally launched to give tangible expression to the fraternity's motto “Alay Sa Sambayanan” and to broaden its service footprint beyond campus. Through the Toy For Totoy initiative, Masig mobilizes its members, student-volunteers, supporters and partner organizations to collect new and gently-used toys, gifts, art materials, and other forms of support, then distribute them to children in chosen communities during the Christmas season.

== Notable members ==
- Butch Dalisay – is a Filipino writer. He has won numerous awards and prizes for fiction, poetry, drama, non-fiction, and screenwriting, including 16 Palanca Awards.
- Randy David – is a Filipino journalist, sociologist, and public intellectual. He is a professor emeritus of sociology at the University of the Philippines Diliman. He is a columnist at Philippine Daily Inquirer.
- Kit Belmonte – is a Filipino lawyer and politician representative for Quezon City's 6th district from 2013 to 2022.
- Mike Defensor – is a Filipino politician who most recently served as the Party-list Representative for Anakalusugan from 2019 to 2022.
- Patrick Gregorio – Philippine Sports Commission Chairman
- Gregorio Honasan – is a Filipino politician and a cashiered Philippine Army officer. He is former member of the Senate of the Philippines.
- Raul Pangalangan – is a Filipino lawyer, and a retired judge of the International Criminal Court. He is a former dean of the University of the Philippines College of Law.
- Miro Quimbo – Chairman of Philippine House Committee on Ways and Means.

== Member misconduct ==
In December 2012, the UP College of Social Sciences and Philosophy filed an administrative complaint against Alpha Sigma and Alpha Phi Beta for brawling.

On June 18, 2015, four Alpha Sigma members at the University of the Philippines Diliman were assaulted by members of Upsilon Sigma Phi. Members of Alpha Sigma was accused of attacking Upsilon Sigma Phi members on June 16, but this alleged attack was not officially documented. Also in June 2015, two members of Alpha Sigma at the University of the Philippines Diliman where attacked and hit with baseball bats by members of Upsilon Sigma Phi. The issues between the two fraternities originated from campus politics. Five members of Upsilon Sigma Phi were arrested for the attacks.

== See also ==
- List of fraternities and sororities in the Philippines
