= Ipsilon =

Ipsilon may refer to:

- Ipsilon Networks, a defunct company
- The Greek letter upsilon
- The Latin letter Y
- The Fedora Project's Ipsilon IdP

== See also ==
- Upsilon (disambiguation)
- Ypsilon (disambiguation)
