= Delta Sigma Xi =

Filipino college confraternity

- ΔΣΞ
- Founded: February 14, 1971; 55 years ago Manuel Luis Quezon University
- Type: Confraternity
- Affiliation: Independent
- Status: Active
- Emphasis: Freedom of speech
- Scope: International
- Motto: "Strive like a lion to respect all among members and officers"
- Pillars: God, Country, Family, Education, Confraternity
- Colors: Black and Gold
- Chapters: 151
- Headquarters: Quezon City; Philippines

Delta Sigma Xi, Inc. (ΔΣΞ) (also Delta Sigma Xi) is a confraternity that was established at the Manuel Luis Quezon University (MLQU), Philippines, in 1971. Built on the idea of brotherhood or unity, its numbers and boundaries soon grew. Soon, chapters were formed at other major universities and schools all over the three major islands of the Philippines and outside of the country.

The fraternity is registered with the Securities and Exchange Commission (Philippines) as a non-profit and non-dividend Corporation.

== History ==
Delta Sigma Xi, founded on February 14, 1971, in the Philippines, began as a student confraternity at Manuel L. Quezon University. Its primary purpose was to promote freedom of speech and encourage people to speak out against injustices, particularly in the context of President Ferdinand Marcos' administration. The group used tools like newspaper articles to reflect the voices and concerns of the people, while maintaining a non-violent and apolitical stance.

However, the political landscape shifted dramatically when President Marcos declared martial law. Protests against his government grew, leading to widespread unrest and a nationwide lockdown. This period was marked by significant civil disobedience, violent protests, and riots, particularly in Manila. Delta Sigma Xi, while originally focused on fostering free speech, witnessed its influence spread across the Philippines, reaching areas like Metro Manila, Ilocos Norte, Baguio, Zambales, Visayas and Mindanao during this turbulent era. Despite the chaos, the confraternity maintained its commitment to its founding ideals amidst the national upheaval.

== Symbols ==
The motto of Delta Sigma Xi is "Strive like a lion to respect all among members and officers". Its pillars are God, Country, Family, Education, and Confraternity. Its colors are black and gold.

== See also ==
- List of fraternities and sororities in the Philippines
