= Pi Sigma =

Filipino socio-political fraternity

- ΠΣ
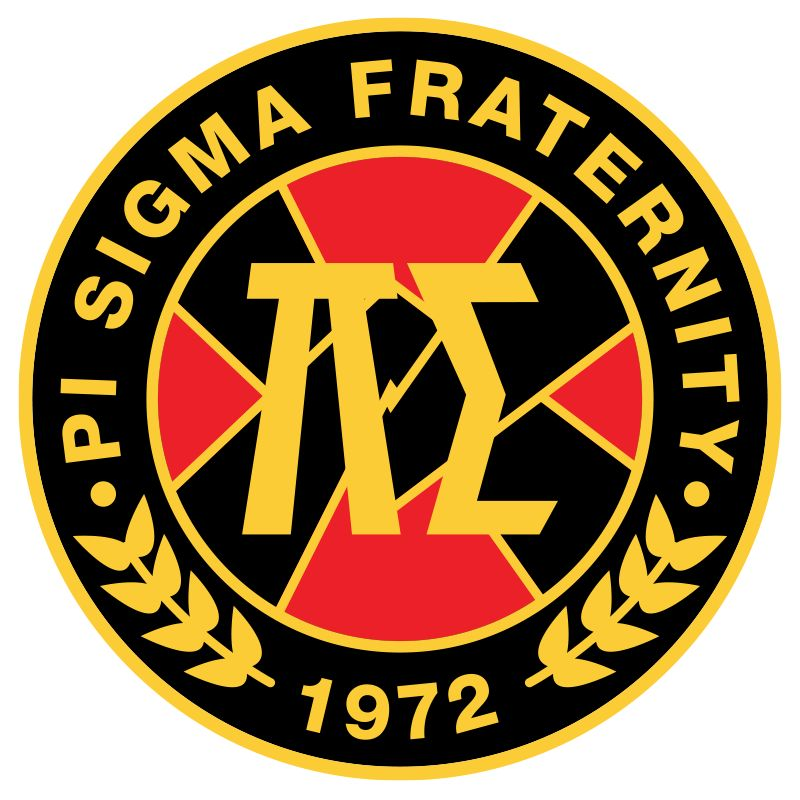
- Founded: August 15, 1972; 54 years ago University of the Philippines Diliman
- Type: Traditional
- Affiliation: Independent
- Status: Active
- Emphasis: Socio-political, Nationalist
- Scope: National (Philippines)
- Motto: Paglingkuran ang Sambayanan "Serve the People"
- Colors: Red, Gold, and Black
- Chapters: 40+
- Members: 10,000+ lifetime
- Nickname: Paragons
- Headquarters: Quezon City; Philippines
- Website: pisigmafraternity.tripod.com

Pi Sigma Fraternity (ΠΣ) is a socio-political fraternity based in the University of the Philippines Diliman. It was established in 1972 and has expanded to include more than 40 chapters.

== History ==
On August 15, 1972, eight students from the University of the Philippines Diliman met in the Molave Residence Hall and established Pi Sigma. The fraternity's founders were Emilio Aguinaldo, Noel David, Stephen David, Onofre Galvez, Francisco Gomez, Oscar Manalaysay, Cesar Romero, and Robert Sombillo. At the time, student organizations were banned on campus but Greek letter fraternities had been allowed to continue to operate.

Additional chapters were created across the Philippines, including UE (Manila and Caloocan branch), UST, Adamson University, FEATI University, TIP, PSBA, UP Manila, UP Los Baños, UP Baguio, University of Caloocan City, and PUP Manila. Community chapters were also established in Bacolod, Baguio, Bicol, Cavite, Cotabato, Davao, Iloilo, La Union, Laguna, Mindanao, Pampanga, and Tarlac.

The Pi Sigma Delta sorority (ΠΣΔ) is its counterpart socio-political sorority founded on February 21, 1975.

The fraternity held its first national convention in Aringay, La Union in March 1979 where its first constitution and by-laws were adopted. Its second national convention was held at the University of the Philippines Diliman from April 6 to 10, 1983.

In 1988, the fraternity inaugurated the Annual UP Pi Sigma Fraternity Open Debate Tournament, the longest-running Open Debate Tournament in the Philippines and in Southeast Asia. It is the only successful annual event hosted by a UP fraternity.

By 2024, the Fraternity had more than 10,000 members.

== Symbols ==
The fraternity's colors are red, gold, and black. The fraternity's name was selected for the Greek letters ΠΣ, which represent the mottos Paglingkuran ang Sambayanan or "Serve the People" Its members call themselves Paragons.

== Notable members ==
- Dong Abay – social & environmental activist, poet, and musician, vocalist of Yano band
- Raul Roco – Philippine Senator; Secretary, Department of Education (Honorary)
- Fidel Nemenzo – mathematician, 11th Chancellor of the University of the Philippines Diliman
- Francisco Nemenzo, Jr. – political scientist, educator, and activist, 18th President of the University of the Philippines
- Elmer Cato - Ambassador and Consul General for the Republic of the Philippines.
- Edwin Laguerder – Mindanao-based youth and farmer's group adviser honored at the Bantayog ng mga Bayani for fighting against the Marcos dictatorship, brutally murdered by the military in 1987

== See also ==
- List of fraternities and sororities in the Philippines
