= BIT International College =

Private college in Bohol, Philippines

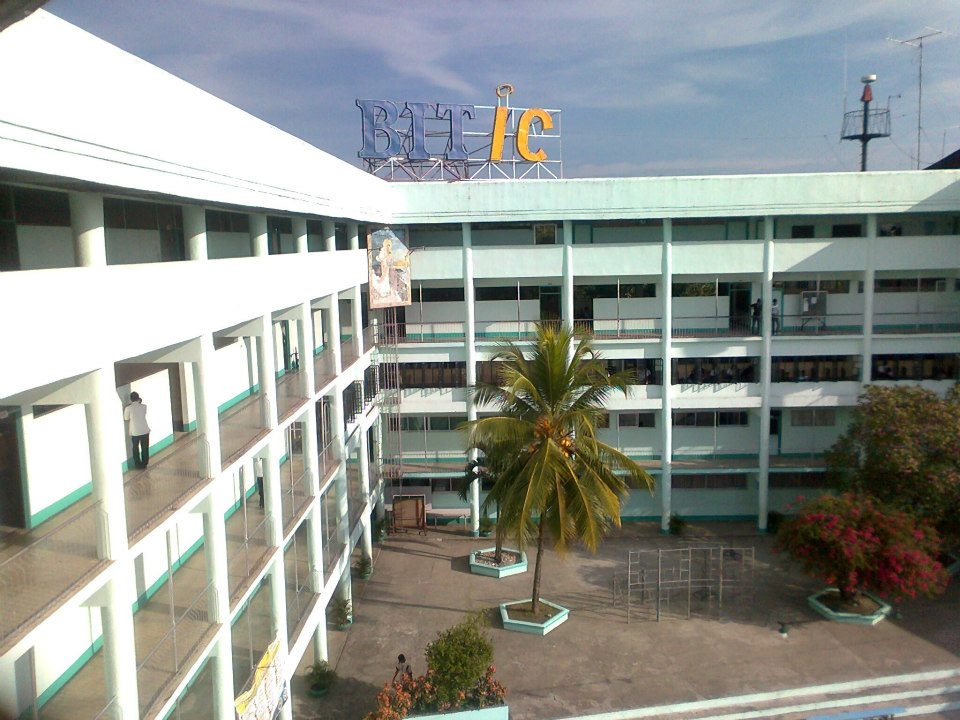
- Main campus
- Former name: Bohol Institute of Technology
- Type: Private, non-sectarian, Co-educational
- Established: 1981
- President: Atty. Dionisio Balite (President Emeritus)
- Location: 100 Gallares Street, 6300 (Tagbilaran Campus), Tagbilaran City, Bohol, Philippines; 9°38′47.2806″N 123°51′9.5148″E
- Campus: Tagbilaran City (Main); Talibon; Jagna; Carmen; Siquijor (as Balite Institute of Technology); Butuan (as Balite Institute of Technology)
- Nicknames: BIT-nians, BIT Cruisers, BIT-IC Beavers
- Website: www.bit-icschools.com
- Location in the Visayas Location in the Philippines

The BIT International College (BIT-IC), formerly the Bohol Institute of Technology or BIT , is a private, non-sectarian, co-educational tertiary institution of higher learning in Tagbilaran City, Bohol, Philippines.

The school was founded by University of Bohol alumnus Atty. Dionisio Balite with his wife Dr. Lilia Balite in 1981.

It offers college courses, primary and secondary education. It is situated along 100 Gallares Street, and has branches in the towns of Talibon, Jagna, and Carmen in Bohol, as well as in the province of Siquijor, and in Butuan where it is using the trade name Balite Institute of Technology.

== Campuses ==
- Bohol Institute of Technology - Carmen, Bohol
- Bohol Institute of Technology - Jagna, Bohol
- Bohol Institute of Technology - Tagbilaran City
- Bohol Institute of Technology - Talibon, Bohol

== Athletics ==
BIT competes in the Bohol Schools Athletic Association.
