= Silliman University College of Law =

Private university in Dumaguete, Philippines

- Motto: Law with a Conscience
- Type: Private
- Established: 1935
- Affiliations: Philippine Association of Law Schools
- Dean: Florin Hilbay
- Location: Villareal Hall, SU Campus; Hibbard Avenue, Dumaguete, Philippines
- Website: www.su.edu.ph

The Silliman University College of Law (abbreviated as SU Law or Silliman Law) is one of the constituent colleges of Silliman University, a private university in Dumaguete, Philippines. The college was founded in 1935 with Emilio Javier and Felix Gaudiel as pioneers. When the college opened, it offered a Bachelor of Laws (LLB) program, but in 2009 it shifted its offering to Juris Doctor (JD). In 2019, Silliman University College of Law was ranked by the Legal Education Board (LEB) as 8th in the list of 10 Top-Performing Law Schools in the Philippines, with 66.67% or 12 out of 18 of its first time Bar Exam Takers passing the 2018 Bar Examinations.

== Academic profile ==
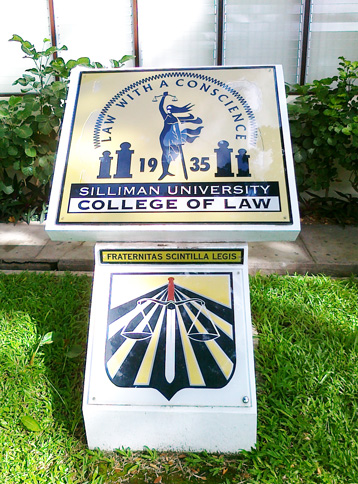
College Landmark

=== Course offering and admissions ===
The college offers a Juris Doctor (JD) program. Admission into the college is very selective. To be admitted for enrollment, the applicant must be a holder of a four-year undergraduate degree (i.e. Bachelor of Science or any equivalent degree) and must have earned at least twelve units in English, six units in Filipino, six units in Mathematics and eighteen units in the Social Sciences, such as History, Political Science, Economics, Philosophy, Psychology, etc.

Applicants must likewise take an entrance examination where the applicant's analytic and writing skills are tested. If the applicant passes the examination, the applicant must also undergo a panel interview where his or her ability to reason verbally is tested. Only after passing both the examination and panel interview can the applicant be qualified to enroll.

=== Curriculum ===
The college utilizes the Model Law curriculum developed by the Philippine Association of Law Schools (PALS) which was approved by the Philippine Government's Department of Education, Culture and Sports on July 9, 1990. Those who reach the junior and senior levels, undergo practical training by engaging in simulated court practice in class and appear in actual court trials before the Municipal or Regional Trial Courts. With the shift to the JD offering in 2009, an added thesis requirement was incorporated into the course curriculum.

=== Bar Review Program ===
The college, in partnership with the Cosmopolitan Review Center, provides bar review classes for a period of six months to prepare bar candidates for the Philippine bar examinations. Lecturers from various parts of the Philippines, particularly from Manila, are employed to conduct the classes. Lecturers include law professors, law deans, justices and judges who are known experts in the fields they teach. The bar review program is open to both Silliman and non-Silliman law graduates.

On top of its regular bar review program, the college also provides specialized classes on certain bar subjects to Silliman law students and graduates as part of its TEN Program. The TEN, abbreviation for The Eagle's Nest, is a mentoring program established to enable exceptionally-talented students showing high academic achievement to be equipped for the Philippine Bar Examinations. In the 2011 Bar Examinations, a Sillimanian landed No. 6 in the top ten. Since its founding, the college has produced at least nine graduates who landed in the top ten in the bar examinations.

=== Publications ===
- The Purple Map
- Silliman Law Journal

=== Center for Law and Development ===
The college is home to the Dr. Jovito Salonga Center for Law and Development, an offspring of the college's long history of legal aid and advocacy. Named after a former senator and well-known legal luminary in the Philippines, it was formally launched by Dr. Jovito Salonga himself on August 26, 2006. The Salonga Center focuses on three main areas of endeavor namely: (1) legal education and training; (2) legal advocacy; and (3) research. Faculty, staff and student participation are combined to make its programs operational. Since its founding, the center has been actively engaged in various activities such as in giving symposia, talks, training sessions and conferences with local community leaders, organizations and agencies of the government. The center also deals with a varied range of issues affecting Philippine society, such as environmental degradation, crime, poverty, the violation of human rights, labor and agrarian issues, and the effect of globalization on local development.

On August 25, 2011, the Salonga Center in cooperation with the Silliman University Chemistry Department launched its own DNA forensic laboratory, the first DNA forensic laboratory in the Visayas.

== Student life ==
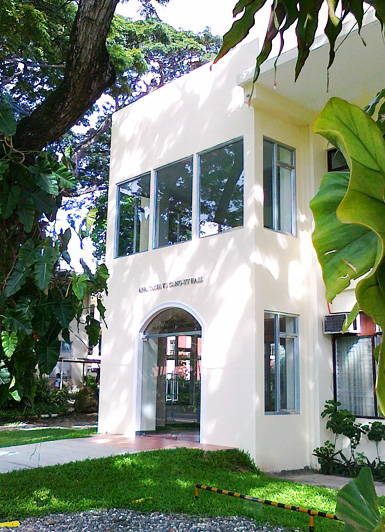
The Anastacia Yu Cang-Uy Hall houses the Dr. Jovito Salonga Center for Law and Development

=== Organizations ===
Various student organizations exist in the college such as the Oratorical and Debating Club (ORADEC), the Order of the Purple Hood, Bar Ops Committee, the Fraternitas Scintilla Legis, a law-based fraternity, and the Portia Sorority. Its student government is headed by the Supreme Law Council, composed of all year-level and organization presidents.

=== Debating and moot court competitions ===
An invitational debate called the Grand Law Debate is annually organized by the Oratorical and Debating Club where for each year, another law school is invited to engage in a friendly debate with the college's own students. The format traditionally used is the Oregon-Oxford type of debate. Since 2007, the college has also been regularly sending participants to the International Humanitarian Law Moot Court Competitions in Manila which is mainly organized by the International Committee of the Red Cross and the Philippine National Red Cross. It won the 3rd Best Memorial in 2007, 2nd Best Memorial in 2008, Best Mooter Award for the General Rounds in 2009, and the championship trophy against the University of the Philippines Diliman in 2010. In 2012, the college also started to join the Jessup International Law Moot Court Competition and in its maiden participation immediately landed third nationwide. In the same year, the college participated for the first time in ANC's Square Off-the CVC Law Debates and immediately won over the contingent from Saint Louis University of Baguio.

=== Facilities ===
The college is presently housed at the Villareal Hall, a building named in honor of Cornelio Villareal, alumnus of Silliman University who became Speaker of the House of the Congress of the Philippines. The building is equipped with fully air-conditioned classrooms, a library, one moot court for court practices and other special events, and a students lounge. Internet access is also available and for a fee, students may opt for WiFi access. In 2007, Villareal Hall was the site of Chief Justice Reynato Puno's historic announcement of the drafting of the Writ of Habeas Data.

== Prominent alumni ==
The SU College of Law has produced numerous alumni that have distinguished themselves in the various fields of law practice. Alumni of the college include among others, senators Lorenzo Teves and the "Great Filibuster" Roseller Lim, Alfredo Flores Tadiar, who has been hailed as the "Father of Alternative Dispute Resolution," Orlando Casimiro, who served as Overall Deputy Ombudsman of the Philippines, Commissioner Kathleen Heceta, and George Arnaiz, Congressman of the 2nd District of Negros Oriental. There are also those who have distinguished themselves in the Judiciary such as former Presiding Justice of the Court of Appeals Jesus Elbinias, the one who wrote and composed the Supreme Court Hymn and the Judiciary Hymn of the Philippine Judiciary; Justice Venancio Aldecoa Justice Ramon Bato, Justice Pamela Abella Maxino, and Deputy Court Administrator Jenny Lind Aldecoa-Delorino.

Notable Silliman Law alumni include:

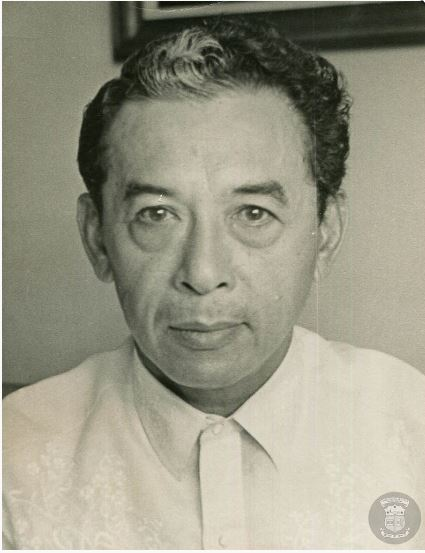
Roseller Lim (LL.B 1940), Senator of the Philippines.

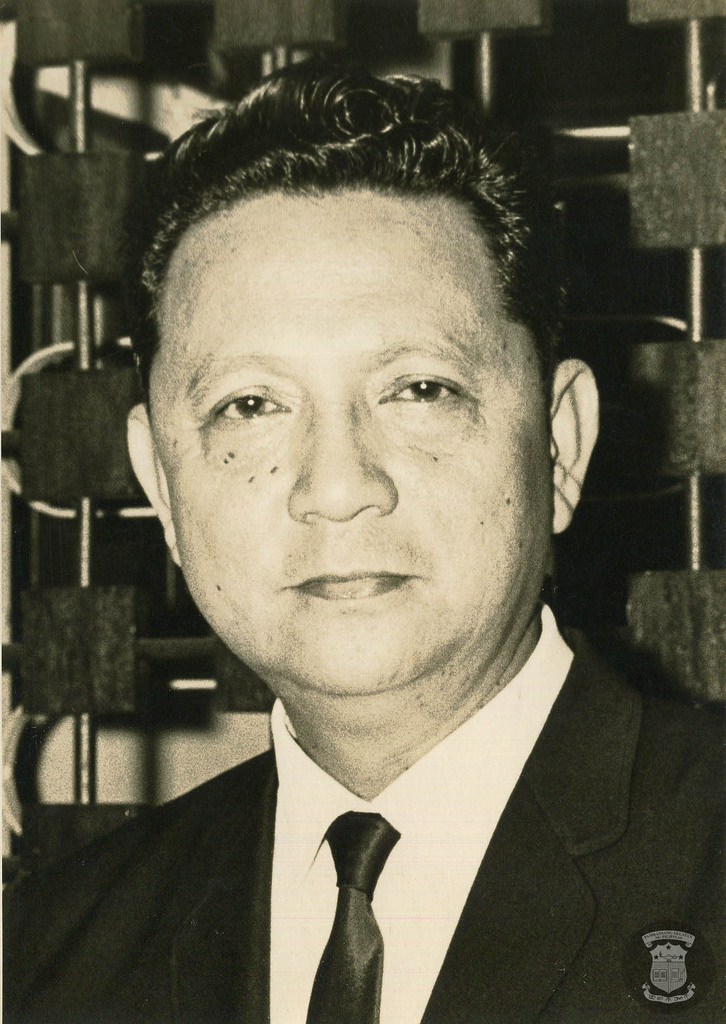
Lorenzo Teves (LL.B 1946), Senator of the Philippines.

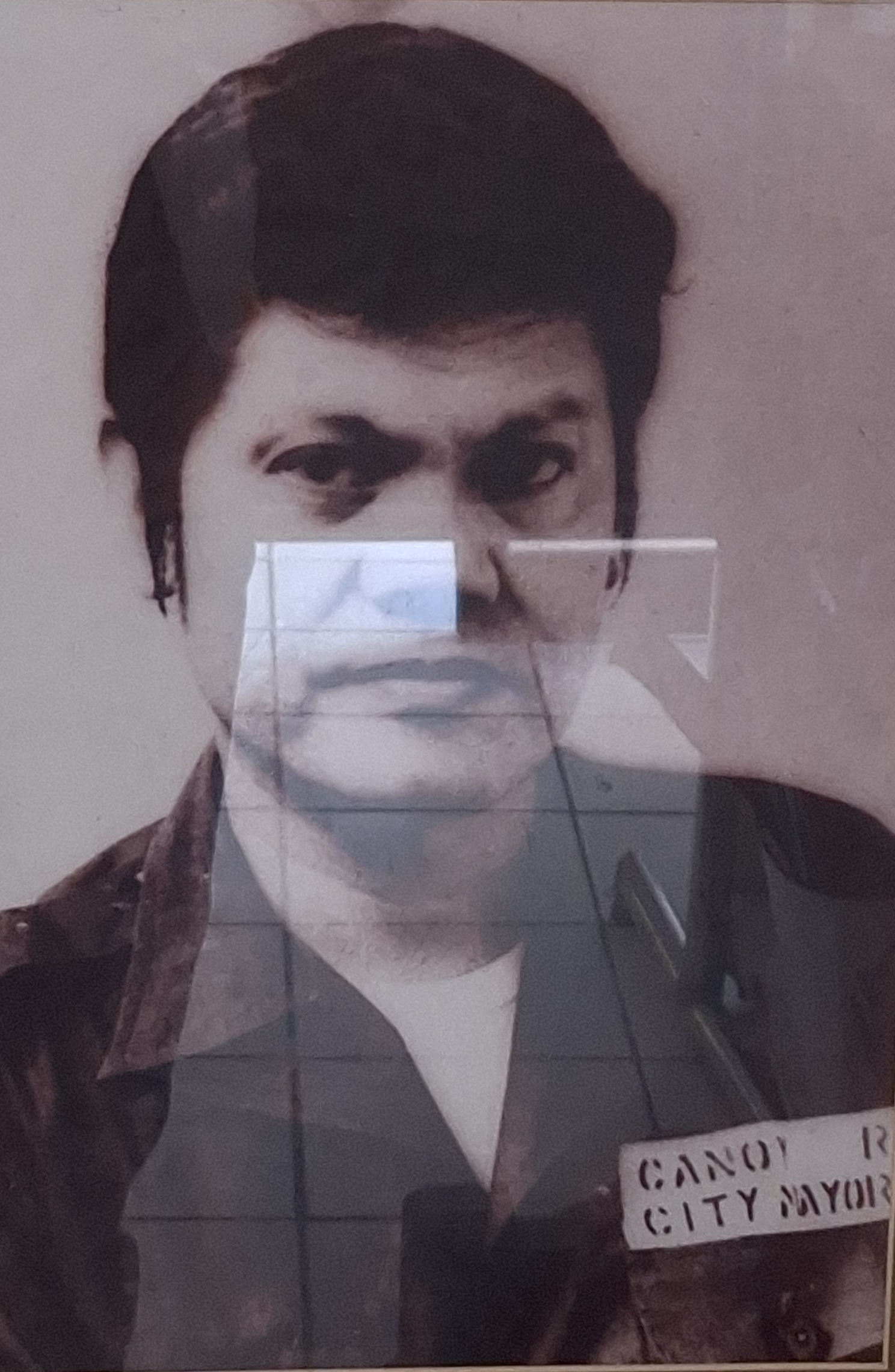
Reuben Canoy (LL.B. 1953), Member, Batasang Pambansa.

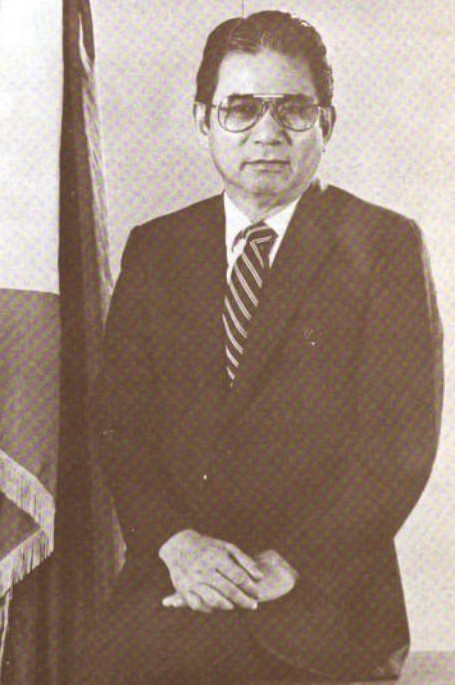
Edelmiro Amante (LL.B 1958), Executive Secretary of President Fidel Ramos.

== See also ==
- Legal education in the Philippines
- Philippine Bar Examination
