= Samahang Ilokano =

Filipino college fraternity and sorority

- SI
- Founded: December 3, 1946; 79 years ago Batac Farm School (now Mariano Marcos State University)
- Type: Traditional
- Affiliation: Independent
- Status: Active
- Emphasis: Ilocano Language (Service, Professional)
- Scope: International
- Colors: Red and Green
- Symbol: Snake on an Arrow
- Chapters: 421+
- Members: 1,00,000+ lifetime
- Headquarters: Manila; Philippines

The Confederation of Ilocano Association, Inc., doing business as Samahang Ilokano (lit., Ilocano Association), is an International fraternity and sorority composed of students and graduates from colleges and universities in the northern part of the Philippines and professionals. Members are either of Ilocano lineage and/or have the capability of speaking and understanding the Ilokano language.

== History ==
Samahang Ilokano was founded in the 1940s as a fraternity to unite Ilocano-speaking students. Ilocano-speaking students from Northern Luzon provinces would pursue higher education in universities away from home and seek fellow Ilocanos for company and protection.

As the fraternity grew, it attracted scrutiny from other fraternities. The growth of the member population also sparked uncontrollable brawls and riots, some of which landed members in prison. The Genuine Ilocano gills (GIG) was formed as a group for SI members who were incarcerated and soon accepted members from within the prison.

Power struggles within the fraternity led to further separation of members. Hence, the birth of another faction now known as the United Ilocandia Fraternity/Sorority (UI). The lack of organization created tension between the three groups.

=== Unity and expansion ===
During martial law, the leaders and founders of the different groups agreed to unite the three organizations. This led to the creation of an umbrella organization, registered with the Securities and Exchange Commission under the name Confederation of Ilocano Association, Incorporated as a non-stock, non-profit, and non-dividend corporation. Members of UI and GIG often do not use CIAUI or CIAGIG, preferring their respective original faction names. This reorganization occurred in 1971. Despite significant changes within the structure, the ultimate purpose of the Samahang Ilokano still stands as "to cradle the Ilocanos".

== Symbols ==
The Samahang Ilokano seal includes a gear with laurel leaves underneath and a white dove in flight above. On top of the gear is an arrow and a red snake. The gear symbolizes the aspiration to develop one's potential in many endeavors. The laurel leaves represents the members' goal of academic and professional excellence. The dove represents freedom, friendship, and peace. The arrow points upwards to acknowledge the Supreme Creator. The snake represents new life and the ability to conquer fear and survive in the wilderness.

== Activities ==
The Saudi Arabia chapter has helped clean up beach litter. Members of the Taiwan chapter celebrate Christmas with an annual Ang Brad Kong Beauty all-male competition and celebrate the Lunar New Year with a basketball tournament.

== Membership ==
Most members of SI-K became professionals, which allowed the group to add chapters for international, military, professional, women's auxiliary, out-of-school youths, and students.

The fraternity claims 3.5 million members. It initiated one million members between 1971 and 2019. Members include professionals and students from colleges and universities situated in the northern Philippines.

== Chapters ==
Samahang Ilokano includes more than 421 chapters as of October 2019. Following is a list of known chapters, including both professional and collegiate groups. Chapters are named for their locations.

Chapter	Type	Chartered	City	Country	Status	References
1st District of Pangasinan chapter			Pangasinan	Philippines		
3rd District of Pangasinan chapter			Pangasinan	Philippines		
1st Kabagis chapter			Kabagis	Philippines		
Alicia chapter			Alicia, Isabela	Philippines		
Baguio-Benguet chapter			Baguio	Philippines		
Cabanatuan City chapter			Cabanatuan	Philippines		
Dagupan chapter			Dagupan	Philippines		
District 1 Tarlac chapter			Tarlac	Philippines		
Edmonton, Canada chapter		February 28, 2013	Edmonton	Canada	Active	
Hong Kong chapter			Hong Kong	China		
Ilagan chapter			Ilagan	Philippines		
International Paradise chapter		February 23, 2021	Waipahu, Hawaii	United States	Active	
Isabela chapter			Isabela	Philippines		
Korea chapter				Korea	Active	
Laoac Pangasinan chapter			Laoac	Philippines		
La Salette Santiago Isabela chapter			La Salette Santiago Isabela	Philippines		
London, England chapter			London	United Kingdom		
Madrid, Spain chapter			Madrid	Spain		
Maritime chapter				Philippines		
Metro Manila chapter			Metro Manila	Philippines		
Qatar chapter	Fraternity		Doha	Qatar	Active	
Qatar chapter	Fraternity		Ras Laffan	Qatar	Active	
Qatar chapter	Fraternity, Industrial			Qatar	Active	
Qatar chapter	Sorority			Qatar	Active	
Resurrection Umingan chapter			Umingan	Philippines		
Samahang Ilocano Saleng chapter		August 27, 2003	Baguio	Philippines	Active	
San Isidro Isabela chapter			San Isidro, Isabela	Philippines		
Saudi Arabia chapter				Saudi Arabia		
Taiwan chapter	Fraternity	2007		Taiwan	Active	(Note: This chapter consists of thirteen sub-chapters.)
Taiwan chapter	Sorority	October 2013		Taiwan	Active	
Tarlac chapter			Tarlac City	Philippines		
Tuguegarao Cagayan chapter			Tuguegarao	Philippines		
Villasis Pangasinan chapter			Villasis	Philippines		
Viscaya chapter				Philippines		

== Notable members ==
- Ferdinand Marcos, President of the Philippines

== Member misconduct ==
On August 17, 1982, eight members of Samahang Ilokano, including four students at the Philippine Marine Institute, approached fellow student Wilfredo Quiambao, asking if he was a member of the fraternity. When Quiambao replied that he was not a member, the brother demanded payment of one peso. The brothers pulled knives on Quiambao when he refused to make the payment, ultimately killing Quiamboa. Fraternity members Rolando Cacile and Valentino Gamiao were found guilty of the murder and sentenced to pay restitution to the victim's family.

== See also ==
- List of fraternities and sororities in the Philippines
