= Fraternitas Scintilla Legis =

Filipino law fraternity

- FSL
- Founded: 1974; 52 years ago Xavier University
- Type: Professional
- Affiliation: Independent
- Status: Active
- Emphasis: Law
- Scope: National (PH)
- Chapters: 5
- Headquarters: Cagayan de Oro, Misamis Oriental; Philippines

The Fraternitas Scintilla Legis, otherwise known as Scintilla Legis, or simply FSL, is a law school-based fraternity in the Philippines. The name of the fraternity is derived from the Latin words scintilla which means spark, and legis which means law.

== History ==
It was founded in 1974 by seven students at the College of Law of Xavier University in Cagayan de Oro.

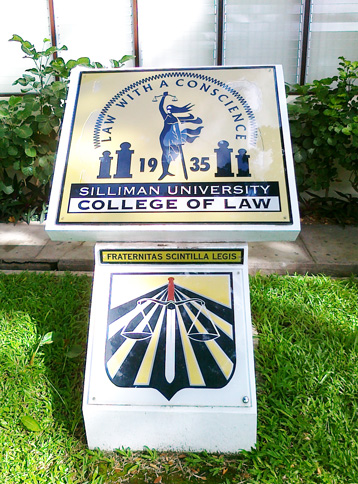
Landmark of the Silliman University College of Law that also bears the old seal of the fraternity

In 1980, a chapter was established in Silliman University and for many years, the two chapters co-existed. In 1996, a group of FSL alumni from Silliman University established a third chapter in Western Mindanao State University. In 2005 a chapter was established in Liceo de Cagayan University and in 2007 another chapter also followed in Bukidnon State University. At present, the fraternity is composed of five chapters, four in Mindanao and one in the Visayas. They meet annually in a national convention.

Since its founding, members of the fraternity have gone through different areas in the practice of law and the three branches of the government, some becoming judges in the trial courts and the Court of Appeals of the Philippines. Among its notable members are Associate Justice Romulo Borja of the Court of Appeals, former governor and congressman George Arnaiz of the Province of Negros Oriental, and Atty. Burt Estrada, the current National President of the Integrated Bar of the Philippines (IBP).

== Chapters ==
- Xavier University (Mother Chapter)
- Silliman University
- Western Mindanao State University
- Liceo de Cagayan University
- Bukidnon State University

== See also ==
- List of fraternities and sororities in the Philippines
