= Tau Alpha =

Filipino engineering fraternity

- τα
- Founded: June 27, 1932; 94 years ago University of the Philippines
- Type: Professional
- Affiliation: Independent
- Status: Active
- Emphasis: Engineering
- Scope: Regional (PH)
- Motto: "For as long as there are Men of Stout Character, Men whose eyes seek the Truth, And Men who call each other Brothers and Mean it, So will there be Tau Alpha."
- Colors: Royal blue and Golden Yellow
- Flower: Rose
- Publication: Gear News
- Chapters: 2
- Members: 1,500+ active
- Headquarters: University of the Philippines College of Engineering; Diliman, Quezon City; Philippines
- Website: taualpha.org

Tau Alpha (τα) is a Filipino engineering collegiate fraternity. It was founded in 1932 at the University of the Philippines College of Engineering of the University of the Philippines Diliman in Diliman, Quezon City, making it one of the oldest fraternities in the Philippines.

== History ==
In early 1931, sixteen undergraduates decided to establish a fraternity for engineering students. Its name was Mu Epsilon, which stood for Manila Engineers, the fraternity was organized in the old Padre Faura grounds of Manila. Its purpose was to develop student leadership, build social and civic responsibility, foster camaraderie and fraternalism, pursue academic excellence, and enhance engineering professions.

Its name was changed to Tau Alpha when it was officially recognized by the university on June 27, 1932. It was one of the first Greek letter organizations in Asia. Angel Francisco Gutierrez de Jesus was its first Grand High Alpha. Later, the fraternity decided not to be limited to the engineering students of Manila and opened its membership to all the students of the college.

Tau Alpha is affiliated with the Tau Lambda Alpha sorority which was founded on June 29, 2012.

In September 2019 Tau Alpha founded its second chapter at University of the Philippines, Los Baños.

== Symbols ==
The name Tau Alpha stands for The Argonauts of Greek mythology. The fraternity originally had fifty members, matching the number of oars on the Argo, which was built by the first Greek engineer, Argos. Like the Argonauts, members commit to seeking the "golden fleece".

The fraternity's colors are royal blue and golden yellow. Its flower is the rose. Its publication is Gear News. Its motto is "For as long as there are Men of Stout Character, Men whose eyes seek the Truth, And Men who call each other Brothers and Mean it, So will there be Tau Alpha."

== Activities ==
Service by Tau Alpha includes the Tau Alpha Student Loan Guarantee Fund, Medical Missions, film showings, tree planting, Youth Build Blitz for Habitat for Humanity and Bloodletting. Tau Alpha also organizes the Argo Cup, one of the legs of the UP Barkada golf circuit. Tournament proceeds go to scholarships and other projects in the UP College of Engineering.

During the COVID-19 pandemic, the fraternity provided 105 test booths to 64 municipalities in 21 provinces, including Baguio, Clark, Daet, Guiguinto, Laoag, Lopez, Lopez, Naga, Urdaneta, and Viganand in Pampanga.

In 2019, the fraternity donated ₱80 million to build the Tau Alpha Infinity Walk from the Quezon Hall to the main library on the campus of UP Dillman. Consisting of a promenade, a plaza, tunnels, artwork, and landscaping, the project commemorated the fraternity’s 90th anniversary in 2021.

== Chapters ==
Collegiate chapters are located at the University of the Philippines Diliman, and the College of Engineering, Architecture and Allied Sciences at the University of the Philippines Los Baños. Alumni chapters include Tau Alpha Down Under in Australia, Tau Alpha East which includes the eastern United States and Canada, and Tau Alpha Overseas West which includes the western United States and Canada.

== Notable members ==
Members of Tau Alpha have gone on to careers as architects, artists, bankers, businessmen, civic leaders, civil servants, educators, engineers, entrepreneurs, farmers, government officials, lawyers, and military officers. Following are some of its notable members.

- Gaudencio E. Antonino (1932), former Senator, 2nd Lieutenant (101st Engineer Bn.), 1st Lieutenant (USAFFE & USAFIP)
- Rigoberto Atienza (1932), Commanding General of Philippine Army in 1964, AFP Chief of Staff in 1965
- Cesar Bautista (1955), Secretary of Department of Trade and Industry (DTI) from 1996 to 1998
- Fiorello Estuar (1955), Head of National Irrigation Administration in 1980, Secretary of Department of Public Works and Highways (DPWH) from 1988 to 1990
- Hilarion Henares Jr (1944), Secretary of National Economic Development Authority (NEDA) from 1964 to 1969
- Melecio Magno (1939), first Minister of National Science Development Board (NSDB) in 1978, before it became Department of Science and Technology (DOST)
- Mario Montejo (1970), Secretary of the Department of Science and Technology from 2010 to 2016
- Vicente Paterno (1944), Senator, Representative to Batasang Pambansa, chairman of the Board of Investments, Minister of Industry, Minister of Public Highways, and Chairman and President of Philippine National Oil Company
- Dante Santos (1946), former CEO and founder of the Philippine Appliance Corporation] (Philacor); member of the Agrava Commission, the independent body that investigated the assassination of Senator Benigno Aquino Jr; President of Philippine Airlines (PAL) from 1986 to early 1990s.

== See also ==
- List of fraternities and sororities in the Philippines
