= Ypsilon (Scheme implementation) =

Ypsilon Scheme
- Original author(s): Yoshikatsu Fujita
- Developer(s): Yoshikatsu Fujita
- Initial release: August 1, 2008; 16 years ago
- Stable release: 0.9.6-update3 / December 23, 2008; 16 years ago
- Operating system: Cross-platform
- Standard(s): R6RS
- Available in: English
- Type: Compiler
- License: Revised BSD license
- Website: www.littlewingpinball.net/mediawiki/index.php/Ypsilon

Ypsilon Scheme is a free software implementation of the R6RS standard of Scheme. It implements mostly concurrent garbage collection, which is optimized for multi-core CPU systems. Its author, Yoshikatsu Fujita, developed the Ypsilon implementation to satisfy the need for a real-time Scheme implementation suitable for computer game development without giving up a garbage collected dynamic interpreter.
