= Mu Sigma Phi (medical fraternity) =

Filipino professional fraternity

- ΜΣΦ
- Founded: October 3, 1933; 93 years ago University of the Philippines
- Type: Professional
- Affiliation: Independent
- Status: Active
- Emphasis: Medical
- Scope: Local
- Motto: "All for the Glory"
- Colors: Green, Red, Yellow, Black, and Gold
- Publication: The Amici
- Chapters: 1
- Members: 1,718 lifetime
- Headquarters: Manila; Philippines
- Website: www.musigmaphi.com

The Mu Sigma Phi, or ΜΣΦ is the first fraternity in the University of the Philippines College of Medicine. It is also the first medical fraternity in the Asian region. The fraternity was first mentioned in the Philippine Collegian in its November 24, 1933 article as the "first and only medical students' fraternity." The Mu Sigma Phi does not confer honorary memberships.

== History ==
The first fraternity in the University of the Philippines College of Medicine. Dr. Fernando Calderon, the first Filipino Dean of the UP College of Medicine and the first Filipino Director of the Philippine General Hospital, became the fraternity's first Faculty Adviser.

As of 2024, it has 1,718 members.

== Symbols ==
The fraternity's motto is "All for the Glory". Its colors are green, red, yellow, black, and gold. Its publication is The Amici.

== Activities ==
Being a fraternity of medical students, the Mu Sigma Phi has developed a tradition of service. Less than two years after its inception, Mu put together a fund for typhoon victims in the island province of Leyte. In the succeeding decades, the Fraternity put up projects for the college and its training hospital, the Philippine General Hospital (PGH). These projects, notably the Mu Blood Bank and the Mu Eye Bank, were turned over to the college. To facilitate access of indigent patients of the PGH to free medicines, Mu put up a 'Charity Medical Bag' in 1956.

In line with the college's emphasis on community medicine, Mu has adopted several communities since the 1970s. Mu contributes medical and educational assistance to these areas through medical missions, public health seminars, and the training of local health workers.

Several organizations, including the Philippine government, have recognized the efforts of Mu Sigma Phi in socio-civic work. In 1997, the Presidential Commission for Urban Poor cited the Fraternity as its "Most Active NGO Partner in Luzon", an award conferred by then President Fidel V. Ramos. The Committee of Health of the Philippine Senate, for its part, declared Mu to be the "Best Community Oriented Student Organization" in 2002. Recently, the Mu Sigma Phi was named as the 2007 Most Outstanding Student Organization in the University of the Philippines-Manila after also being bestowed the same honor the previous year.

Today, service activities of the Fraternity include medical missions, blood-letting drives, benefit concerts, and working trips to its adopted communities. These are usually held on Saturday and Sundays as the undergraduate brods have classes from Monday to Friday.

== Foundation ==
In 2004, alumni of the Mu Sigma Phi and its counterpart sorority formed the Mu Sigma Phi Foundation, a nonprofit organization which aims to support the projects of the UP College of Medicine. Its most recent project was the renovation of the Anatomy laboratory for the benefit of first-year medical students. This undertaking was completed in July 2006.

In December 2008, Mu Sigma Phi celebrated its diamond jubilee. Its website lists over 1,600 brothers from all over the world.

== See also ==
- List of fraternities and sororities in the Philippines
