= Confraternity of Catholic Saints =

Catholic organization of young people in the Philippines

- Official Logo of the Confraternity of Catholic Saints
- Formation: 1 October 2003
- Type: Catholic Confraternity
- Headquarters: Cubao, Quezon City, Philippines
- Location: 14°38′N 121°2′E
- Members: 6 fraters (3 from the Diocese of Cubao, 3 from the Diocese of Kalookan), 7 scholars, 100 cooperators (census as of 2010)
- Director: Fra. Dave Caesar Dela Cruz
- Website: confraternityofcatholicsaints.blogspot.com

The Confraternity of Catholic Saints (CCS) was a Catholic organization of young people in the Philippines. Their dedication is to proclaim the gospel and to promote the Catholic view that holiness is very possible.

In 2014, the Confraternity decided to change its name to The Cause for Canonization of Blessed Ivan Merz.

== Overview ==
The Confraternity of Catholic Saints, was an organization of young people in the Philippines, consecrated to the Trinity through the Blessed Virgin Mary. Using the gospel of Jesus Christ and the lives and works of Catholic saints to fulfill their mission, they promoted holiness among Catholics and to the world with a special focus on youth. The purpose of their ministries was to inspire people to be holy, and to encourage loyalty to the Roman Catholic Church, its teachings, the Pope, and the Diocesan Bishop. The fulfillment of their mission was to realize the universal call to holiness of the Catholic Church.

== History of CCS ==
The Confraternity of Catholic Saints began on 1 October 2003 as the Ministry for the Promotion of Holy Men and Women at the Roman Catholic Diocese of Cubao, dedicated to promote the new Saints of the Catholic Church. Its foundation was led by Dave Caesar Dela Cruz and Lloyd Paul Elauria, both from the Diocese of Cubao.

In August 2006, it changed its name to the Confraternity of Catholic Saints (CCS) in the presence of the pioneer fraters of the CCS, namely (each with his religious name) Dave Caesar Dela Cruz (Francis Teresa Maria of the Immaculate Conception and of the Holy Cross), Lloyd Paul Elauria (Tarciso Bonaventura Maria a Croce), Weldann Lester Panganiban (John Ezekiel Maria of the Miraculous Medal and of the Cross), Matthew Taleon (Joseph Pio Maria of the Visitation of our Lady), John Felix Santos [John of Saint Mary, Mother of God], Adrian Millena (Paul Lawrence Maria of the Resurrection), Carlos Babiano (Josemaria of the Sacred Hearts of Jesus and Mary), and Roel San Miguel (John Therese Maria of the Annunciation). The charism of the CCS was the promotion of devotion, lives and spirituality of the Catholic Saints.

On 13 July 2007 Rev. Fr. Angelo Ma. S. Legal, of the Catholic (OSB) became the Spiritual Director of the CCS.

The CSS was the Official Promoter for the Cause of Canonization for Blessed Ivan Merz of Croatia in the Philippines, the Official Group-Promoter of Blessed Alberto Marvelli of Italy in the Philippines, a recognized prayer group for the Cause of Beatification and Canonization of the Servant of God, Pope John Paul II, and Recognized Promoter of Saint Rita de Cascia (by the Mother Abbess), Monastery of Saint Rita de Cascia, Cascia, Italy.

In October 2007, Director, Dave Caesar Dela Cruz, visited the tomb of Blessed Ivan Merz in Croatia. The Confraternity was recognized by the Archbishop of Zagreb, Josip Cardinal Bozanic; the Archbishop of Sarajevo, Vinko Cardinal Puljik (Bosnian, Croatian: Vinko Puljić); and the Bishop of Banja Luka, Franjo Komarika.

On 5 October 2008, the fifth anniversary of the Confraternity, the first members dedicated themselves to the work of promotion of Blessed Ivan Merz and other Saints and candidates for Sainthood.

The official logo of the CCS

=== Logo and motto ===
The motto of the CCS was taken from the Holy Scripture in the Book of the First Epistle of Peter (1:16), "Sancti eritis, quia ego sanctus sum," translated as "Be holy, for I am holy."

In the official logo, the letters C, C, and S are formed like a heart which symbolizes the ministry and core values (Commitment, Charity, and Service) of the Confraternity of Catholic Saints (CCS) being embedded in the hearts of its members. The three flames above the heart at the left symbolize the three inspirations of the Confraternity: Blessed Teresa of Calcutta, Saint Josemaria Escriva, and Saint Louis de Montfort while the larger flame at the right symbolizes Saint Therese of the Child Jesus and of the Holy Face, the secondary patroness of the Confraternity. The letter "M" inside the heart symbolizes the Blessed Virgin Mary, the Mother and Queen of the CCS. The cross at the center of the logo symbolizes Jesus, the center and life of the Confraterity.

=== Ministries ===
The ministries of the CCS were defined according to its Constitution and by-laws given on June 1, 2008.

1. To promote the devotion to and lives of the Holy Men and Women recognized by the Roman Catholic Church by Canonization, Beatification, and Recognition of Heroic Virtues, including those from the churches in communion with Rome.
2. To help parishes, religious congregations, and associations foster devotion to their own saints (their patrons, founders, and/or members).
3. To take care of relics of the saints that the confraternity members and/or the diocese owns.
4. To host a public viewing and veneration of the relics of saints in parishes, communities, schools, hospitals, houses, and offices.
5. To help the Catholic Church stop different kinds of abuses to relics of saints and report it to the competent ecclesiastical authorities (e.g. the Local Ordinary) and/or to the postulators.
6. To conduct spiritual activities according to the spirituality of a particular saint through seminars, recollections, retreats, pilgrimages, etc.
7. To visit the sick and those who need spiritual assistance and pray for them through the intercession of the saints.

=== Structure ===
The Confraternity of Catholic Saints consisted of two groups. These were the Fraters Group (men who are consecrated and living within the area of Metro Manila and serving full-time the CCS' needs) and the Cooperators Group (who wished to share in the mission of the CCS cooperating in or outside the Metro Manila area).

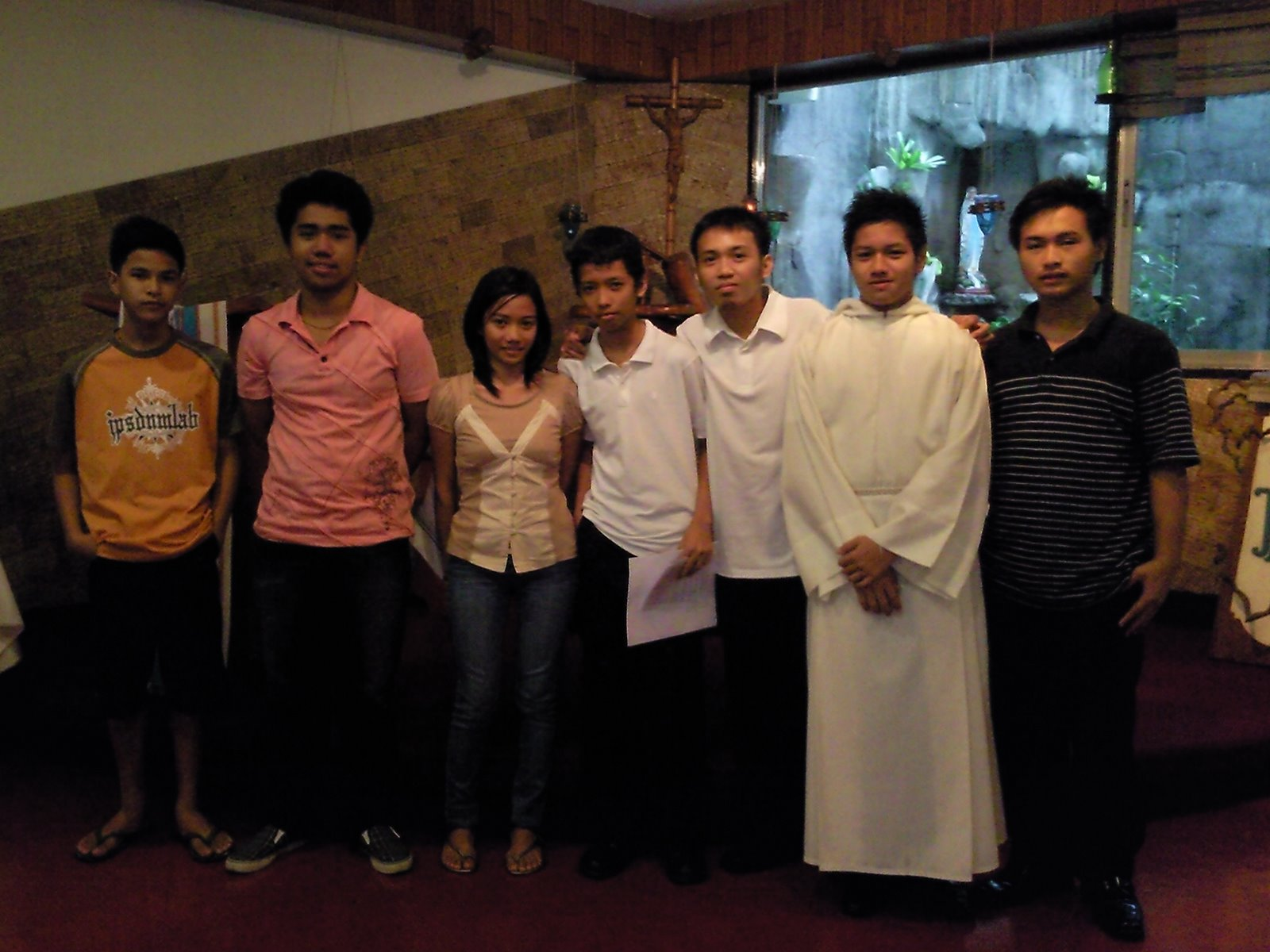
The Scholars of the Blessed Ivan for the Year 2009

== History of The Cause for Canonization of Blessed Ivan Merz ==
In 2014, CCS changed its name to "The Cause for Canonization of Blessed Ivan Merz". It became the first group to dedicate its work through a catechetical exhibit of sacred relics that brought the Tour of Sacred Relics.

The group became known during the canonization (2014) of Pope John Paul II. They received the first blood relic of the Pope in the country and organized the nationwide tour of his relics. Other themes of the tour included the Relics of Mother Teresa, Our Lady of Fatima and her visionaries, Padre Pio, canonized and beatified popes and Saint Joseph.

The new organisation has three missions;

- Mission for sanctification (including tour of sacred relics, mass card and spiritual direction)
- Mission for evangelisation (including Pathfire Philippines)
- Mission for Charity (including Blessed Ivan Merz Scholarship Fund and Kusina ni Blessed Ivan [Feeding Program for the Homeless])

These missions combine to lead and educate people, especially young people, to Jesus Christ. This is in line with their motto, Ducere et Docere Populum Iesum (to lead and teach the people Jesus).
