= Mu Sigma Phi (sorority) =

Filipino medical sorority

- μΣΦ
- Founded: August 27, 1934; 92 years ago University of the Philippines Manila
- Type: Professional
- Affiliation: Independent
- Status: Active
- Emphasis: Medicine
- Scope: National (PH)
- Pillars: Sisterhood, Service, Scholarship, and Leadership
- Chapters: 2
- Members: 1,718 lifetime
- Headquarters: 670 Padre Faura Street; Ermita, Manila, Metro Manila 1000; Philippines
- Website: www.musigmaphi.com

The Mu Sigma Phi Sorority, Inc. (μΣΦ), founded on August 27, 1934, is the first medical sorority in the Philippines and Asia. Aside from being recognized by both the University of the Philippines Manila and UP College of Medicine, it is also registered under the Securities and Exchange Commission of the Philippines. Guided by the four pillars of Sisterhood, Service, Scholarship, and Leadership, the Sorority has 90 years of heritage and over a thousand female physicians dedicated to the Sorority's ideals, which are responsive to the needs, abilities, and interests of young female physicians and physicians-in-the-making in service of the country

== History ==
On August 27, 1934, seven members of the Ladies Auxiliary Committee of the Mu Sigma Phi fraternity (which formed a year earlier) decided to forge a separate identity. Guided by the four pillars, the Sorority went on to carve a name for itself as a pioneer and trailblazer. Since 1942, the Mu Sigma Phi Drug Bank, Mu Sigma Phi Blood Bank (now known as the Philippine General Hospital or PGH Blood Bank), and Mu Sigma Phi Eye Bank have continued to serve the indigent patients of the PGH.

The celebration of the Diamond Year (75th anniversary) of the Sorority came to a close with the end of School Year 2009-2010. During the year, the sorority successfully mounted "'Brilyante", a fashion show-fundraiser for the Cervical Cancer Awareness Program. The Mu Sigma Phi Sorority was also named one of the "Ten Accomplished Youth Organizations" of the Philippines, a distinction awarded by the National Youth Commission. Together with the Mu Sigma Phi Fraternity, the sorority was likewise very involved in the relief efforts for Typhoons Ondoy and Pepeng.

== Symbols ==
=== Seal ===
- Black is for the endless search for knowledge
- Gold is for the pursuit of excellence
- Red is for the triumph of science over death
- Green is for the commitment to the upliftment of the quality of life
- Flame is for the spirit, fervor, and aspirations of the members of the Sorority

== Activities ==
The Sorority holds weekly free clinics and surgical missions in different barangays. The Sorority was able to serve 14,238 patients in 2007-2008. The Sorority also keeps the PGH Patient Assistance Fund, and holds annual projects such as Parol Para sa Sanggol supporting the PGH Pediatrics Wards, MUla sa Puso for the PGH Medicine Wards, Excellence, Knowledge, Genius (EKG) inter-college and -university pre-medical quiz show, and in collaboration with the Fraternity, Brainstorm, an inter-medical school quiz show.

== Awards ==
The Mu Sigma Phi Sorority has been recognized by both the University of the Philippines and the Philippine Government:

- "National Winner, Ten Accomplished Youth Organizations (TAYO) 2009", given by the National Youth Commission
- Finalist, Ten Accomplished Youth Organizations of the Philippines (TAYO) 2005, given by the National Youth Commission
- Member, Hall of Fame, Most Outstanding Student Organizations in UP Manila
- Gawad ng Dekano Awardee for Most Outstanding Student Organization (2002-2003)
- Senate Committee on Health Awardee for Community-Oriented Medical Education (2002)
- Most Outstanding NGO Partner (1999)
- Presidential Awardee for the Most Active NGO in Luzon in the Service of the Urban Poor (1998)
- Most Outstanding Organization in UP Manila (1994-1997)

== Chapters ==
Institution	Charter date	Location	Status	Ref.
University of the Philippines Manila	August 27, 1934	Manila, Philippines	Active	
University of the Philippines College of Medicine		Ermita, Manila, Philippines	Active	

== See also ==
- List of fraternities and sororities in the Philippines
