= Upsilon Phi Sigma =

Filipino collegiate fraternity and sorority

- ΥΦΣ
- Founded: February 14, 1935; 91 years ago University of the Philippines Los Baños
- Type: Traditional
- Affiliation: Independent
- Status: Active
- Emphasis: Social
- Scope: National
- Motto: Unitas, Pax, Et Salus! "Unity, Peace, and Prosperity for All!"
- Pillars: Honor, Service, and Excellence
- Colors: Red White Blue
- Symbol: Shield
- Chapters: 55 active
- Nickname: Upsilonians
- Headquarters: Door# 17, Ground Floor, Dover Magallanes Building; Padre Gomez cor. Bonifacio Street; Davao City 8000; Philippines

Upsilon Phi Sigma (ΥΦΣ), abbreviated as UPS, is a Filipino inter-university and collegiate fraternity and sorority. It was established in the University of the Philippines Los Baños in 1935 and has chartered more than 160 chapters.

== History ==
The Upsilon Phi Sigma Honor and Excellence Service Fraternity was established at the University of the Philippines on February 14, 1935. Its founders were seven students from various colleges within the University of the Philippines. On May 14, 1935, these founders, along with other original members, formally drafted a comprehensive constitution and set of by-laws to guide the fraternity's mission and principles.

Upsilon Phi Sigma decided to include women in its roster of members, expanding across the Philippines as Upsilon Phi Sigma fraternity and sorority. In 2015, it had 164 active collegiate and alumni chapters in the Philippines. In March 2023, the Upsilon Phi Sigma was one of the fraternities to agree to support the Republic Act (RA) 11053, or the Anti-Hazing Law.

Upsilon Phi Sigma's national headquarters are in Davao City, Philippines.

== Symbols ==
The fraternity's Greek letters represent Unitas Pax-Et Salus. Its motto isUnitas, Pax, Et Salus! or "Unity, Peace, and Prosperity for All!". Its vision or pillars are Honor, Service, and Excellence. Its official symbol is the shield, signifying the strong establishment of the organization in the early 1900s. Its colors are red, white, and blue.

== Activities ==
Upsilon Phi Sigma gives away 100 red roses every Valentine's Day to recognize its founding anniversary. It offers humanitarian services to the schools and communities of the Philippines.

== Membership ==
Potential members of Upsilon Phi Sigma must be a college student or a professional who believes in God, has a good character and reputation, have never been convicted of a crime, and have never joined or attempted to join another fraternity.

== Chapters ==
Upsilon Phi Sigma has chartered 164 collegiate chapters, 55 of which are active. It has alumni groups in the Philippines and other countries, including Australia, New Zealand, the United States, Canada, Germany, Taiwan, and Saudi Arabia. It also has community-based chapters in Kota Kinabalu, Malaysia, and other parts of Asia.

== See also ==
- List of fraternities and sororities in the Philippines
