= Lake Upsilon =

Lake in the state of North Dakota, United States

- Location within North Dakota
- Location: Rolette County, North Dakota
- Coordinates: 48°58′05″N 99°50′20″W
- Type: lake
- Basin countries: United States
- Surface area: 422 acres (1.71 km^{2})
- Max. depth: 27 ft (8.2 m)
- Surface elevation: 2,106 ft (642 m)

Lake Upsilon is a lake in Rolette County, North Dakota, in the United States.

This lake was so named on account of its shape, upsilon meaning Y in Greek.

== See also ==
- List of lakes in North Dakota
