= Quintin Gomez =

Filipino anesthesiologist (1919–2003)

Quintin Juan Gomez, MD (April 12, 1919 – September 30, 2003) was a Filipino pioneer anesthesiologist. He established the first formal training for anesthesiology in the Philippine General Hospital in 1949, earning him the title Father of Modern Anesthesia of the Philippines.

== Professional biography ==
Gomez earned his Bachelor of Arts from the University of the Philippines in 1939 and Doctor of Medicine from the same university in 1944. He went to Chicago and trained in anesthesiology under Dr. Max Sadove from 1946 -1948.

In 1949, he joined the Faculty of the College of Medicine in the University of the Philippines and was appointed Professor of Anesthesiology where he began to work for the development of anesthesiology as an independent specialty in the Philippines.

He represented the Philippines at the 4th World Congress in London in 1968 where he was elected Treasurer of World Federation Societies of Anesthesiologists, the first Filipino to hold a high position the international organization. He was re-elected for a second term at the World Congress in Kyoto in 1972. He worked for the establishment of a Western Pacific Training Center in Manila to further the specialty in Asia. It opened in December 1970 under Gomez' directorship. He was elected president at the 6th World Congress of Anesthesiology in Mexico City in 1976 and presided in the 7th World Congress in Hamburg in 1980.

== Published works ==
- 1984. Anesthesia, Safety for All with Lydia M. Egay and Merle F. De la Cruz-Odi
- 1835: Nalbuphine as a Component of Surgical Anesthesia
