= Mindanao Polytechnic College =

Private college in General Santos, Philippines

- Type: Private
- Established: 1980
- Affiliations: ISO
- President: Capt. Arturo A. Aguilar, MM
- Location: Makar-Polomolok Junction, National Highway, General Santos, General Santos, South Cotabato, Philippines; 6°07′02″N 125°08′41″E
- Colors: Blue and Red
- Nickname: MPC Gensan / MPC Dolphins
- Website: www.mpcgensan.edu.ph
- Location in Mindanao Location in the Philippines

Mindanao Polytechnic College (MPC) is a maritime school located at the junction of the National Highway and the Makar-Koronadal Road, about 7 kilometers from downtown General Santos, Philippines.

== History ==
Mindanao Polytechnic College (MPC), formerly called Mindanao Polytechnic School (MPS), was established by Capt. Arturo A. Aguilar, MM. a mariner and a former harbor pilot of the Port of General Santos, and his wife, Susan R. Aguilar, an education graduate and business entrepreneur. When it was founded in February 1980, it was the only maritime school in the Soccsksargen area.

During the initial year of operation, the school rented two separate buildings in the downtown area of General Santos. In June 1981, the school transferred to its new three-hectare campus at Crossing Makar. In 1981, the Philippine Association of Maritime Institutions (PAMI) accepted MPS as a full-fledged member. In that same year, MPS President Capt. Aguilar was elected as one of the officers of PAMI, and the school became a member of the Philippine Association of Private Technical Institutions (PAPTI). The name of MPS was changed to Mindanao Polytechnic College (MPC) in 1984.

MPC offers maritime and nautical degrees including bachelor's of science degrees in marine engineering and marine transportation, and non-maritime degrees including mechanical engineering, hotel and restaurant management, customs administration, and information technology/systems. Enrollment has grown from 2,176 in the 2005 school year to 4,705 in the 2012-13 school year.
