= University of Bohol =

Private university in Bohol, Philippines

University of Bohol Rafael Palma University
- Kinatumhaan sa Bohol (Cebuano)
- Other name: UB
- Former name: Rafael Palma College (1946-1970)
- Type: Private, research, non-sectarian, coeducational basic and higher education institution
- Established: 1946; 80 years ago
- Founders: Atty. Victoriano D. Tirol, Sr.
- Academic affiliations: DepEd, CHED, PAASCU, PACUCOA
- Chairman: Atty. Ulysses B. Tirol
- President: Dr. Victoriano B. Tirol III
- Administrative staff: 300+-
- Students: 7,000+-
- Location: Dr. Cecilio Putong St., Brgy. Cogon, Tagbilaran City, Bohol, Philippines; 9°38′53″N 123°51′15″E
- Campus: Main Campus, VDTALC Campus, Grade School and Law Campus
- Alma Mater song: UB Hymn
- Colors: Yellow; Red; Blue
- Mascot: Flying Lemurs
- Website: universityofbohol.edu.ph
- Location in the Visayas Location in the Philippines

The University of Bohol, also referred to by its acronym U.B., is a private nonsectarian co-educational basic and higher education institution of higher learning in Tagbilaran City, Bohol, Philippines. It is the first university to be established in the province of Bohol.

== History ==
It was established as the Rafael Palma College in 1946. Its main building is situated along Maria Clara Street.

== Notable alumni ==
- Napoleon Abueva, national artist in sculpture.

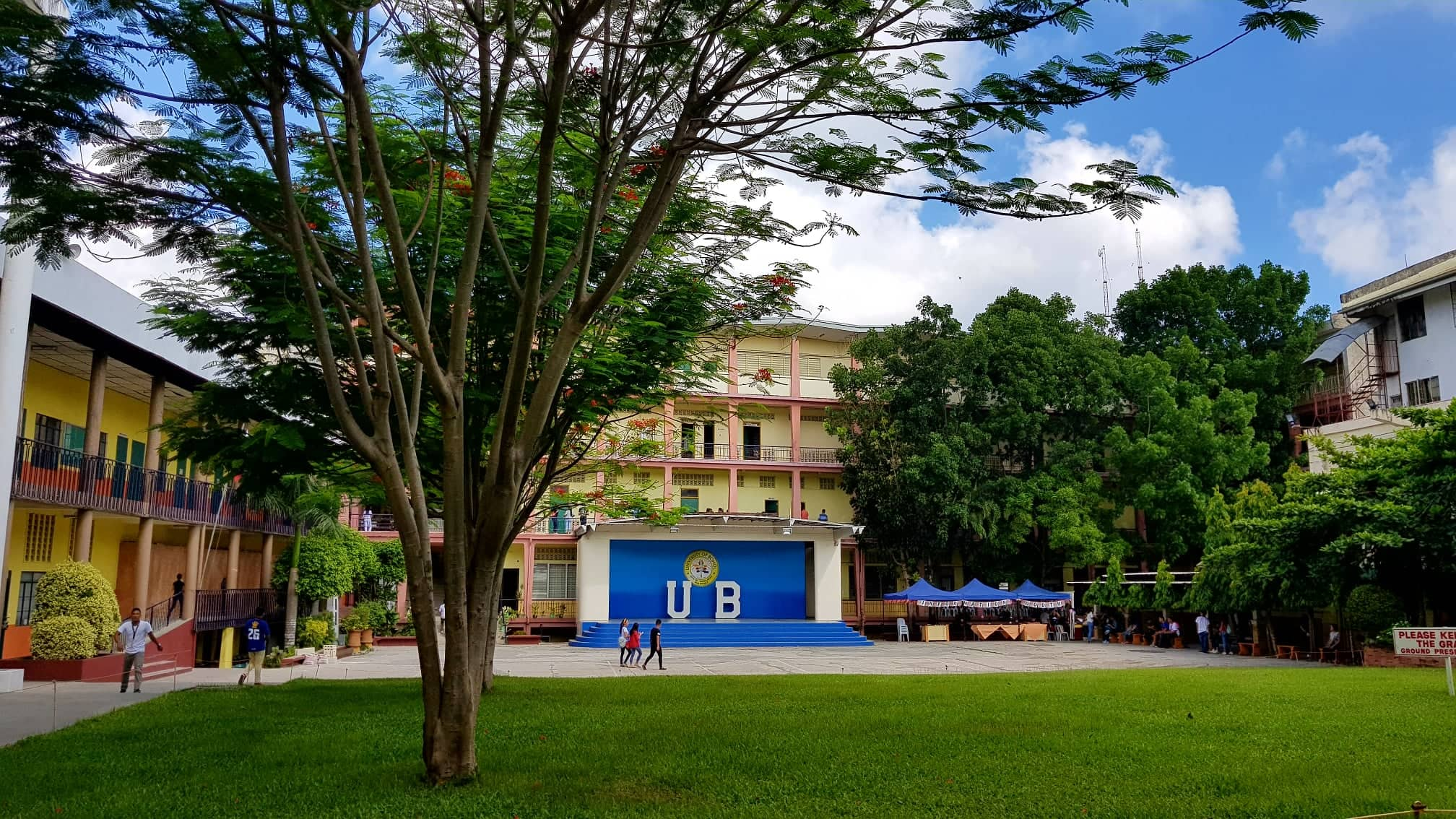
University of Bohol
