= List of hazing deaths in the Philippines =

This is a list of hazing-related deaths in the Philippines. This is not an exhaustive list. Inclusion in this list requires that the incident was described by the media as a hazing-related death. The majority of deaths in this list include but are not limited to cases that involve fraternities.

The first reported hazing death in the Philippines was that of Gonzalo Mariano Albert, a University of the Philippines Diliman student and an Upsilon Sigma Phi neophyte. He died in 1954.

The death of Leonardo Villa in 1991 led to the passage of the Anti-Hazing Act of 1995.

== List ==
=== Before 1990 ===
| Date of death | Victim | Organization | Institution | Notes |
|---|---|---|---|---|
| July 18, 1954 | Gonzalo Mariano Albert | Upsilon Sigma Phi | University of the Philippines Diliman, Quezon City | The first recorded hazing-related death in the Philippines. Died from a burst appendix during an operation. President Ramon Magsaysay created the Castro Committee to investigate the death. The committee found hazing not to be the cause of Albert's death but added that the mauling he received prior to the operation weakened him physically. |
| August 1967 | Ferdinand Tabtab | Alpha Phi Omega | University of the Philippines Diliman, Quezon City | First recorded hazing death in the history of the fraternity. |
| April 13, 1969 | Miguel Arucan | Military hazing | Philippine Military Academy, Baguio | |
| August 21, 1976 | Mel Honasan | Beta Sigma | San Sebastian College – Recoletos, Manila | Brother of Gregorio Honasan, who was later elected as Senator of the Philippines. |
| February 23, 1978 | Manuel Salas | Military hazing | Philippine Military Academy, Baguio | |
| November 9, 1981 | Andres Ramos Jr. | Military hazing | Philippine Military Academy, Baguio | |
| July 1983 | Arbel Liwag | Beta Sigma | University of the Philippines Diliman, Quezon City | |

=== 1990s ===
| Date of death | Victim | Organization | Institution | Notes |
|---|---|---|---|---|
| February 10, 1991 | Leonardo Villa | Aquila Legis | Ateneo de Manila University, Quezon City | In November 1993, 26 of 35 accused fraternity members were initially convicted of homicide. After the case was brought to the Court of Appeals and the Supreme Court, the charges against the five were eventually downgraded to reckless imprudence resulting in homicide in 2012; nineteen were acquitted in 2002; and two died pending the decisions. Charges against the other five were dismissed. In 2014, the SC issued a final decision that the five were "eligible for probation." Villa's death led to the passage of the Anti-Hazing Act of 1995. |
| September 8, 1991 | Raul Camaligan | Lex Talionis | San Beda College, Manila | Camaligan's father filed charges of murder against the fraternity members involved. The case was won with the paddle used in the hazing rites used as evidence. |
| October 13, 1991 | Frederick Cahiyang | Alpha Phi Omega | University of the Visayas, Cebu City | Reportedly the first publicized fatal hazing incident in Cebu schools. |
| 1991 | Felipe Narne | No information | Araullo University, Cabanatuan, Nueva Ecija | |
| 1991 | Dennis Cenedoza | Military hazing | Cavite Naval Training Center, Cavite City | |
| 1991 | Joselito Mangga | Military hazing | Philippine Merchant Maritime Institute, Makati | |
| 1992 | Joselito Hernandez | Scintilla Juris | University of the Philippines Baguio, Baguio | |
| 1995 | Seth Lopez | Reserve Officers' Training Corps | De La Salle University | Lopez's parents filed murder charges, which were eventually dropped. De La Salle University introduced the Non-Fraternity Contract for freshmen after the incident. |
| August 6, 1995 | Mark Roland Martin | Epsilon Chi | University of the Philippines Diliman, Quezon City | |
| August 6, 1995 | Oliver Estrella | Tau Gamma Phi | Holy Angel University, Angeles City | |
| August 6, 1995 | Marvin Sarmiento | Tau Gamma Phi | Holy Angel University, Angeles City | |
| August 16, 1998 | Alexander Icasiano | Alpha Phi Beta | University of the Philippines Diliman, Quezon City | |

=== 2000s ===
| Date of death | Victim | Organization | Institution | Notes |
|---|---|---|---|---|
| June 2000 | Ace Bernabe Ekid | Military hazing | Philippine Military Academy, Baguio | |
| May 15, 2000 | Dominante Tunac | Police hazing | Philippine National Police Academy, Silang, Cavite | |
| March 10, 2001 | Edward Domingo | Military hazing | Philippine Military Academy, Baguio | Two cadets were convicted of homicide by the Baguio Regional Trial Court for his death, the first time that a civilian court convicted cadets of the Philippine Military Academy. |
| April 7, 2001 | Monico de Guzman | Military hazing | Philippine Military Academy, Baguio | |
| May 2, 2001 | Fernando Balidoy | Military hazing | Philippine Merchant Marine Academy, San Narciso, Zambales | |
| August 4, 2001 | Rafael Root Albano III | Sigma Mu | Far Eastern University, Manila | |
| January 5, 2003 | Jeoffrey Andawi | Police hazing | Philippine National Police Academy, Silang, Cavite | |
| 2003 | Emerson Berry Jr. | Beta Sigma Rho | Casanayan National High School, Pilar, Capiz | |
| August 22, 2004 | Jonathan Bombase | Alpha Phi Omega | Partido College, Goa, Camarines Sur | |
| October 2, 2005 | Dan Robert Talibutab | Kapatiran ng mga Kabataang Kriminolohiya | St. Therese – MTC Colleges - Magdalo, Iloilo City | |
| January 14, 2006 | Marlon Villanueva | Alpha Phi Omega | University of the Philippines Los Baños, Los Baños, Laguna | Died during initiation rites conducted at the Villa Novaliches Resort in Barangay Pansol, Calamba, Laguna. His case saw the first conviction under the Anti-Hazing Act of 1995. Two Alpha Phi Omega members were sentenced to reclusion perpetua in a 2015 decision. |
| March 3, 2006 | Clark Anson Silverio | Tau Gamma Phi | Technological University of the Philippines, Manila | |
| May 6, 2006 | Jan Angelo Dollete | Alpha Phi Omega | Capiz State University, Roxas City, Capiz | |
| August 18, 2006 | Dennis Africa | Tau Gamma Phi | Pamantasan ng Lungsod ng Muntinlupa, Muntinlupa | |
| January 28, 2007 | Mark Rodriguez | Tau Gamma Phi | Central Luzon State University, Muñoz, Nueva Ecija | |
| March 11, 2007 | Ronald Sequeña | Tau Gamma Phi | Palawan State University, Puerto Princesa | |
| August 27, 2007 | Cris Anthony Mendez | Sigma Rho | University of the Philippines Diliman, Quezon City | |
| August 2, 2008 | Chester Paulo Abracias | Tau Gamma Phi | Enverga University, Lucena, Quezon | |
| August 21, 2009 | Karl Anthony Gaudicos | Tau Gamma Phi/Tau Gamma Sigma | Holy Cross of Davao College, Davao City | |
| January 24, 2009 | Josephus dela Rosa | Military hazing | Training and Doctrine Center (TRADOC), Philippine Army, Camp O'Donnell, Capas, Tarlac | |
| October 2, 2009 | John Vincent Bernat | Alpha Kappa Rho | Northern Mindanao State Institute of Science and Technology, Butuan | |
| October 12, 2009 | Elvis Sinaluan | Scouts Royale Brotherhood | No information, died in Alfonso, Cavite | |
| October 22, 2009 | John Daniel Samparanda | Tau Gamma Phi | Lyceum of the Philippines University–Cavite, General Trias, Cavite | |
| November 14, 2009 | Glacy Monique Dimaranan | Scouts Royale Brotherhood | Lakeshore National High School, Biñan, Laguna | Shot in the head during an initiation ritual. |

=== 2010s ===
| Date of death | Victim | Organization | Institution | Notes |
|---|---|---|---|---|
| April 15, 2010 | Daniel Lorenz Jacinto | Unknown | Mapúa Institute of Technology, Manila | |
| July 18, 2010 | Menardo Clamucha Jr. | Kapatiran ng mga Kabataang Kriminolohiya | University of Iloilo, Iloilo City | |
| August 15, 2010 | EJ Karl Initia | Alpha Phi Omega | University of Makati, Makati | |
| October 27, 2010 | Noel Borja Jr. | Tau Gamma Phi | DepEd Alternative Learning System, Manila | |
| May 2011 | Erik Apura | Military Hazing | Philippine Merchant Marine Academy, San Narciso, Zambales | |
| September 15, 2011 | Nor Silongan | Tau Gamma Phi | Notre Dame of Tacurong College, Tacurong, Sultan Kudarat | |
| February 19, 2012 | Marvin Reglos | Lambda Rho Beta | San Beda College, Manila | |
| July 30, 2012 | Marc Andre Marcos | Lex Leonum Fraternitas | San Beda College, Manila | |
| October 12, 2013 | John Mark Dugan | Collegiate hazing | Maritime Academy of Asia and the Pacific, Mariveles, Bataan | |
| June 28, 2014 | Guillo Servando | Tau Gamma Phi | De La Salle–College of Saint Benilde, Manila | |
| November 2, 2014 | Ariel Inofre | Tau Gamma Phi | Southern Luzon State University, Lucban, Quezon | Died in a hospital in Naga, Camarines Sur after undergoing a hazing ritual in Tagkawayan, Quezon on October 17. |
| June 24, 2015 | Christian Dela Cruz | True Brown Style | Fortunato F. Halili National Agricultural School, Santa Maria, Bulacan | |
| September 30, 2015 | Anthony Javier | Tau Gamma Phi | Western Mindanao State University, Zamboanga City | |
| September 17, 2017 | Horacio Castillo III | Aegis Juris | University of Santo Tomas, Manila | Ten suspects were convicted and sentenced to life imprisonment in 2024. |
| September 18, 2019 | Darwin Dormitorio | Military hazing | Philippine Military Academy, Baguio | Three PMA cadets were convicted and sentenced to life imprisonment in 2024. |

=== 2020s ===
| Date of death | Victim | Organization | Institution | Notes |
|---|---|---|---|---|
| February 16, 2020 | Omer Despabiladeras | Tau Gamma Phi | Solis Institute of Technology, Bulan, Sorsogon | |
| August 9, 2020 | Robert John Limpioso Fernandez | Alpha Kappa Rho | No information, died in Surigao City, Surigao del Norte | |
| November 15, 2020 | Joselito Envidiado | Tau Gamma Phi | Zamboanga National High School West, Zamboanga City | |
| July 6, 2021 | Jonash Bondoc | Collegiate hazing | Philippine Merchant Marine Academy, San Narciso, Zambales | |
| September 9, 2021 | Mark Lester Miranda | No information | Doña Hortencia Salas Benedicto National High School, La Carlota, Negros Occidental | Died after undergoing a hazing ritual in San Enrique, Negros Occidental. |
| September 23, 2021 | George Karl Magsayo | Police hazing | Philippine National Police Academy, Silang, Cavite | |
| March 20, 2022 | Reymarc Rabutazo | Tau Gamma Phi | Unnamed high school in Kalayaan, Laguna | |
| July 26, 2022 | Jaypee De Guzman Ramores | Police hazing | Philippine National Police, San Jacinto, Masbate | |
| September 18, 2022 | August Caezar Saplot | Alpha Kappa Rho | University of Mindanao, Davao City | |
| December 19, 2022 | Ronnel Baguio | Tau Gamma Phi | University of Cebu, Cebu City | |
| February 18, 2023 | John Matthew Salilig | Tau Gamma Phi | Adamson University, Manila | Went to a fraternity initiation in Biñan, Laguna and disappeared on that date. Found dead in an open field in Imus, Cavite on February 28. One suspect later committed suicide. |
| October 16, 2023 | Ahldryn Lery Bravante | Tau Gamma Phi | Philippine College of Criminology, Manila | Died hours after sustaining injuries at his fraternity initiation in Quezon City. Four suspects were arrested. |
| July 8, 2024 | Vince Andrew Delos Reyes | Collegiate hazing and punishment | NYK-TDG Maritime Academy, Calamba, Laguna | Died after being made to do strenuous exercises by a senior cadet over an alleged infraction on July 8. |
| September 29, 2024 | Ren Joseph Bayan | Tau Gamma Phi | San Pablo National High School, Jaen, Nueva Ecija | Died after undergoing a hazing ritual in San Leonardo, Nueva Ecija. |
| July 31, 2025 | Charlie Patigayon | Military hazing | Philippine Army's 6th Infantry Battalion headquarters, Maguindanao del Sur | Died after undergoing a welcoming ceremony. |
| March 1, 2026 | Kenneth Alcedo | Tau Gamma Phi | PNTC Colleges, Dasmariñas, Cavite | Died after being left at a hospital in General Trias, Cavite by three companions who were identified as suspects, one of whom later surrendered. |

== See also ==
- List of hazing deaths in the United States
- Hazing in Greek letter organizations
- List of fraternities and sororities in the Philippines
