= National Anti-Hazing Hotline =

American college fraternity collaborative

- Formation: 2007
- Parent organization: Manley Burke

The National Anti-Hazing Hotline is an anonymous reporting system for suspected incidents of hazing by North American college fraternities and sororities. It was created by a collaborative of 21 American Greek letter organizations in 2007 and currently involves 47 national and international groups. The hotline is independently monitored by the law firm Manley Burke.

== History ==
The National Anti-Hazing Hotline was established in 2007 by 21 American collegiate fraternities and sororities. Norval Stephens of the Delta Tau Delta Educational Foundation led the effort to establish the hotline as a way to end hazing on college campuses, especially within Greek letter organizations. The hotline's founding fraternity sponsors were Alpha Epsilon Pi, Alpha Sigma Phi, Delta Chi, Delta Sigma Phi, Delta Tau Delta, Delta Upsilon, Kappa Alpha Order, Lambda Chi Alpha, Phi Gamma Delta, Phi Kappa Psi, and Sigma Pi. Its founding sororities and women's fraternities were Alpha Chi Omega, Alpha Delta Pi, Alpha Epsilon Phi, Alpha Phi, Alpha Sigma Tau, Chi Omega, Gamma Phi Beta, Kappa Kappa Gamma, Sigma Sigma Sigma, and Zeta Tau Alpha.

The National Anti-Hazing Hotline allows anyone to call and anonymously report suspected hazing incidents. The hotline is monitored 24 hours a day by Manley Burke, a Cincinnati, Ohio law firm. Manley Burke receives reports through a toll-free phone line or its website, and emails a report to the national office of the organization named in the complaint. Participating organizations make a voluntary financial contribution that sponsors of the National Anti-Hazing Hotline effort.

By early 2012, the hotline was receiving around six calls per week. In addition to receiving reports about fraternities and sororities, the hotline has also received calls related to athletics, college bands, and campus clubs.

As of 2024, 47 national and international fraternities and sororities are sponsors of the National Anti-Hazing Hotline effort. Kappa Sigma fraternity does not accept or process hotline reports.

== Sponsoring organizations ==
Following are the hotline's sponsoring organizations as of 2024.

=== Fraternities ===
- Acacia
- Alpha Chi Rho
- Alpha Tau Omega
- Alpha Sigma Phi
- Alpha Phi Alpha
- Beta Theta Pi
- Chi Psi
- Delta Chi
- Delta Kappa Epsilon
- Delta Phi
- Delta Sigma Phi
- Delta Tau Delta
- Delta Upsilon
- Iota Phi Theta
- Kappa Alpha Order
- Kappa Alpha Psi
- Kappa Delta Rho
- Lambda Chi Alpha
- Phi Delta Theta
- Phi Gamma Delta
- Phi Kappa Psi
- Phi Kappa Sigma
- Phi Kappa Tau
- Phi Kappa Theta
- Phi Mu Delta
- Pi Kappa Alpha
- Pi Kappa Phi
- Sigma Alpha Epsilon
- Sigma Alpha Mu
- Sigma Nu
- Sigma Pi
- Sigma Phi Delta
- Sigma Tau Gamma
- Tau Kappa Epsilon
- Theta Chi
- Theta Delta Chi
- Theta Xi
- Zeta Beta Tau

=== Sororities and women's fraternities ===
- Alpha Chi Omega
- Alpha Delta Pi
- Alpha Epsilon Phi
- Alpha Gamma Delta
- Alpha Phi
- Alpha Sigma Tau
- Chi Omega
- Delta Delta Delta
- Delta Zeta
- Gamma Phi Beta
- Kappa Delta
- Kappa Kappa Gamma
- Omega Phi Beta
- Phi Mu
- Pi Beta Phi
- Sigma Sigma Sigma
- Zeta Tau Alpha
- Sigma Gamma Rho

== See also ==
- Anti-Hazing Act of 1995
- Hazing
- Hazing in Greek letter organizations
- List of hazing deaths in the United States
