= Anti-Hazing Act of 2018 =

Philippine law prohibiting hazing

17th Congress of the Philippines
- Long title: An Act Prohibiting Hazing and Regulating Other Forms of Initiation Rites of Fraternities, Sororities, and Other Organizations, and Providing Penalties for Violations Thereof, Amending for the Purpose Republic Act No. 8049, Entitled “An Act Regulating Hazing and Other Forms of Initiation Rites in Fraternities, Sororities, and Organizations and Providing Penalties Therefor”
- Citation: Republic Act No. 11053
- Territorial extent: Philippines
- Enacted by: Senate of the Philippines
- Enacted: March 12, 2018
- Enacted by: House of Representatives of the Philippines
- Enacted: March 13, 2018
- Signed by: Rodrigo Duterte
- Signed: June 29, 2018

Legislative history

Initiating chamber: Senate of the Philippines
- Bill title: Anti-Hazing Act of 2018
- Bill citation: Senate Bill No. 1662
- Introduced by: Gregorio Honasan
- Introduced: January 23, 2018

Revising chamber: House of Representatives of the Philippines
- Bill title: Anti-Hazing Act
- Bill citation: House Bill No. 6573

Amends
- Republic Act No. 8049
- Status: In force

The Anti-Hazing Act of 2018, officially designated as Republic Act No. 11053, is a Philippine law that prohibits hazing and regulates other forms of initiation rites in fraternities, sororities, and other organizations. It amended Republic Act No. 8049, the country's earlier anti-hazing law, by expressly prohibiting all forms of hazing, expanding the persons and organizations covered, and increasing criminal and administrative penalties.

The law applies to school-based and community-based organizations, as well as the Armed Forces of the Philippines, the Philippine National Police, and similar uniformed-service learning institutions. Although hazing is prohibited, initiation rites that do not constitute hazing remain lawful when the notice, registration, monitoring, and other requirements of the Act are followed.

== Background ==
Republic Act No. 8049 was enacted in 1995 following public outrage over the 1991 hazing death of Leonardo "Lenny" Villa. The Supreme Court later described the earlier statute as intended to criminalize hazing and prevent organizations from making it a condition of membership. Republic Act No. 8049 regulated initiation rites by requiring advance notice to school authorities and an undertaking that no physical violence would occur. By 2018, it had been criticized as ineffective; The Philippine Star reported that only one conviction had been obtained under the law during its first 23 years.

The September 2017 hazing death of Horacio Tomas "Atio" Castillo III, a first-year law student at the University of Santo Tomas, prompted renewed efforts to amend the 1995 law. The Senate investigation into Castillo's death was followed by Committee Report No. 233 and Senate Bill No. 1662.

== Legislative history ==
Senate Bill No. 1662 was authored by Senator Gregorio Honasan and sponsored by Senator Panfilo Lacson, who chaired the Senate Committee on Public Order and Dangerous Drugs. On February 12, 2018, the Senate approved the bill on third reading by a vote of 19–0, with no abstentions.

A bicameral conference committee reconciled Senate Bill No. 1662 with House Bill No. 6573. The Senate and the House of Representatives approved the consolidated measure on March 12 and March 13, 2018, respectively. President Rodrigo Duterte signed it as Republic Act No. 11053 on June 29, 2018.

== Provisions ==
=== Definition and scope ===
The Act defines hazing as an act that causes physical or psychological suffering, harm, or injury to a recruit, neophyte, applicant, or member as part of an initiation rite, admission requirement, or requirement for continued membership. Its non-exhaustive examples include paddling, whipping, beating, branding, forced calisthenics, exposure to weather, forced consumption of food, alcohol, drugs, or other substances, and brutal or forced physical activity. It also covers acts that humiliate, degrade, abuse, or endanger a person by requiring menial, silly, or foolish tasks.

The prohibition applies to fraternities, sororities, and organizations in schools, including citizens' military and army training, and to community-based and similar non-school organizations. For purposes of the Act, an organization includes clubs, associations, groups, the Armed Forces of the Philippines, the Philippine National Police, the Philippine Military Academy, the Philippine National Police Academy, and similar institutions. Hazing may not be required as a condition of employment.

The Act excludes approved physical, mental, and psychological testing and training for prospective regular members of the armed forces, police, and similar uniformed institutions. It also excludes customary athletic events, comparable competitions, and activities serving a legal and legitimate objective, subject to prior medical clearance or certification.

=== Regulation of initiation rites ===
Only initiation rites that do not constitute hazing are permitted. A school-based organization must file a written application with the proper school authorities at least seven days before an initiation. The application must identify the date, place, recruits, officers, and persons who will conduct the rite; it must also describe how the rite will be conducted and be posted in designated conspicuous places. An initiation may not last longer than three days.

The head of the school must assign at least two representatives to attend, document, and report on the initiation. Organizations with student members must register with school authorities and periodically update their membership lists. Schools must require a faculty adviser who is not a member of the organization, exercise reasonable supervision, conduct information campaigns for students and parents or guardians, and provide orientation programs concerning organizational membership.

Community-based organizations must register with the barangay, municipality, or city where they are based and update their lists of members and officers annually. They are subject to comparable application and monitoring rules, with at least two local officials assigned to observe and document an initiation.

Any advance consent, agreement, or waiver by a recruit, neophyte, or applicant to an initiation involving hazing is void. Consent to hazing is not available as a defense in a prosecution under the Act.

=== Penalties and liability ===
Section 14 establishes several levels of criminal and financial penalties:

Principal penalties under Section 14
Conduct or circumstance	Penalty
Planning or participating in hazing that results in death, rape, sodomy, or mutilation	Reclusion perpetua and a fine of ₱3 million
Planning or participating in hazing; specified officers, advisers, alumni, nonresident members, and other persons whose participation or presence falls within Section 14(b)	Reclusion perpetua and a fine of ₱2 million
Presence during the conduct of hazing, when not covered by a higher penalty	Reclusion temporal in its maximum period and a fine of ₱1 million
Concealing hazing or obstructing a later investigation, when committed by a former officer, nonresident member, or alumnus	Reclusion temporal and a fine of ₱1 million
Intimidation, threats, force, or vexation used to recruit a person into an organization	Prision correccional in its minimum period
A school's approval of an initiation during which hazing occurs, or failure to provide the required representatives	Fine of ₱1 million

Owners or lessees who knowingly allow hazing on their property and fail to prevent or promptly report it may be liable as principals. The same rule may apply to parents when hazing is conducted in the home of an officer or member and the parents have actual knowledge of it. School personnel and local officials who allow or consent to hazing and fail to prevent or report it may be liable as accomplices and may also face administrative sanctions.

The presence of any person during hazing is prima facie evidence of participation as a principal unless the person prevented the prohibited acts or promptly reported them to law-enforcement authorities, when this could be done without danger to the person or the person's family. Incumbent officers of the organization are jointly liable with members who actually participated. A final conviction must be entered in the convicted person's scholastic, personal, or employment record.

== Implementing rules and prevention campaign ==
The Act directed the Commission on Higher Education (CHED), together with seven other agencies, to issue implementing rules and regulations (IRR) within 90 days of the law's effectivity. In October 2019, the Commission on Human Rights publicly urged CHED to expedite the rules following further hazing incidents. The participating agencies signed the IRR on September 30, 2020; it was subsequently published in the Official Gazette.

In February 2020, Duterte issued Proclamation No. 907, declaring the second week of February each year as National Hazing Prevention Week. The proclamation assigned CHED to lead and coordinate the annual observance and directed national government agencies and state educational institutions to participate.

== Judicial interpretation ==
In Fuertes v. Senate of the Philippines (2020), the Supreme Court, sitting en banc, rejected a constitutional challenge to Section 14's presumption arising from a person's presence during hazing. The Court held that the presumption is disputable and does not violate the constitutional presumption of innocence or constitute a bill of attainder. It also held that the more favorable penalty introduced by Section 14(c) could apply retroactively to an accused charged for conduct that preceded the 2018 amendment.

== See also ==
- Anti-Hazing Act of 1995
- List of hazing deaths in the Philippines
- Death of Darwin Dormitorio
- Death of John Matthew Salilig
