= Phi Gamma Delta =

North American collegiate social fraternity

- FIJI / ΦΓΔ
- Founded: May 1, 1848; 178 years ago Jefferson College
- Type: Social
- Affiliation: NIC
- Status: Active
- Scope: North America
- Motto: Φιλότης Γλυκυτάτη Δυναστεία; Philotēs Glykytatē Dynasteia "Friendship, the sweetest influence"
- Pillars: Friendship, Knowledge, Service, Morality, Excellence
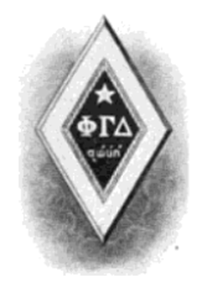
- Member badge
- Colors: Royal purple and White
- Symbol

- Flag
- Flower: Purple clematis
- Publication: The Phi Gamma Delta
- Chapters: 139
- Colonies: 13
- Members: 211,000+ lifetime
- Nickname: Fiji, Phi Gam
- Headquarters: 1201 Red Mile Rd; P.O. Box 4599; Lexington, Kentucky 40504; United States
- Website: phigam.org

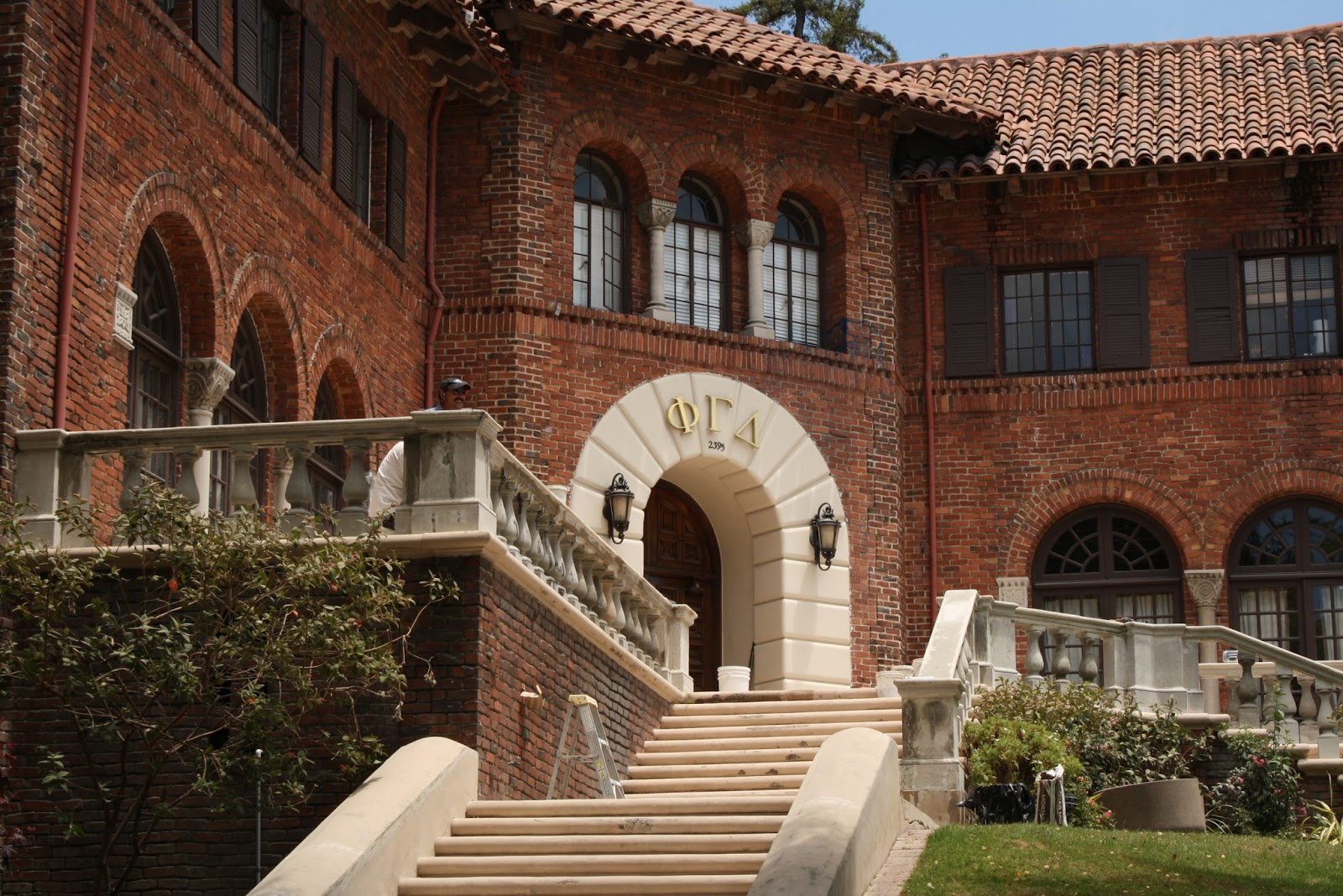
University of California, Berkeley (Delta Xi) chapter house

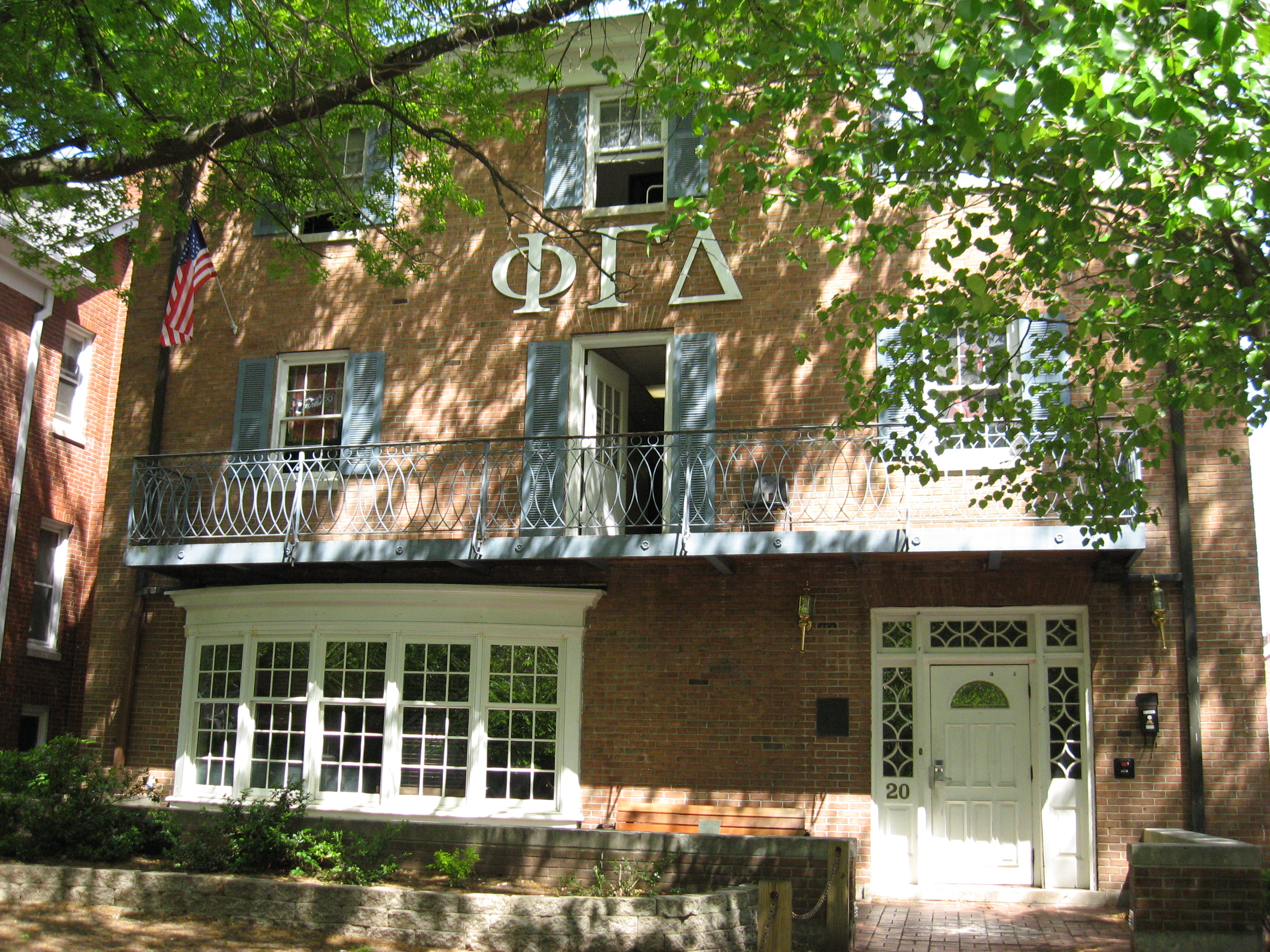
Ohio University (Alpha Omega) chapter house

Phi Gamma Delta (ΦΓΔ), commonly known as Phi Gam and sometimes written as FIJI, is a North American social fraternity with 139 active chapters and 13 colonies across the United States and Canada. It was founded at Jefferson College, Pennsylvania, in 1848. Along with Phi Kappa Psi, Phi Gamma Delta forms half of the Jefferson Duo. Since its founding, the fraternity has initiated more than 211,000 brothers.

== History ==
=== Founding ===
Phi Gamma Delta was founded on April 22, 1848, at Jefferson College in Canonsburg, Pennsylvania. Six students gathered in a dormitory room (known by the students as "Fort Armstrong") to establish a secret society. The society they formed was initially called "The Delta Association". The founders, referred to by members as the "Immortal Six", were Daniel Webster Crofts, James Elliott Jr., Naaman Fletcher, Ellis Bailey Gregg, John Templeton McCarty, and Samuel Beatty Wilson. Contrary to popular belief, the Immortal Six were not Freemasons when they entered Jefferson College.

The first regular meeting of Phi Gamma Delta and the adoption of the fraternity's constitution took place on May 1, 1848. Consequently, May 1 was chosen to be Founder's Day at the 43rd Convention held in 1891 and has traditionally been celebrated as the founding date of the Fraternity.

A second chapter, Beta, was established at Washington University later in 1848. In 1850, Gamma, was chartered at the University of Nashville. This was followed by Delta at the Union University and Epsilon at the University of North Carolina in 1851. Eleven of the fraternity's first sixteen chapters were in the Southern United States. By 1878, it had initiated 2,472 members.

By 1890, Phi Gamma Delta had 4,244 members, 40 active chapters, and 23 inactive chapters. It had established a club with a rented house in New York City and had graduate associations in Chattanooga, Tennessee; Cleveland, Ohio; Columbus, Ohio; Kansas City, Missouri; Williamsport, Pennsylvania; and New York City. In 1905, the fraternity had initiated 9,979 members and chartered 81 chapters, with 57 being active.

By 1930, Phi Gamma Delta had initiated 27,582 members and had seventy active collegiate chapters, 24 inactive collegiate chapters, 73 graduate chapters, and 37 graduate associations. All seventy of the active college chapters had houses. The fraternity had graduate club houses in New York City and Detroit, Michigan. It also had a summer camp in the Rocky Mountains.

=== Kappa Alpha Theta ===
Members of the Lambda chapter at Indiana Asbury University (now known as DePauw University) played an important role in the founding of Kappa Alpha Theta women's fraternity. Bettie Locke, the sister of George W. Locke (DePauw, 1871), was one of the first women enrolled at DePauw. Bettie Locke had many Phi Gam friends and one of them asked her to wear his badge. She contended that she would do so only if she knew the secrets behind the letters. The fraternity, after debate, declined to initiate her. So, upon the suggestion of her father, John Wesley Locke, a Beta Theta Pi, she formed Kappa Alpha Theta with a few other women enrolled at DePauw at the time. Kappa Alpha Theta was founded on January 27, 1870. Phi Gamma Delta later presented Bettie Locke with an engraved silver cake basket as a token of friendship.

== Symbols ==
The fraternity's motto is the Greek phrase Φιλότης Γλυκυτάτη Δυναστεία, which the fraternity translates as "Friendship, the sweetest influence". Its mission statement lists five core values or pillars: friendship, knowledge, service, morality, and excellence. In addition, members are encouraged to live by three priorities in this respective order: scholarship, fraternity, and self.

Phi Gamma Delta's badge is diamond-shaped, with the Greek letters "ΦΓΔ" on a black background and a gold border. About the letters is a white enamel five-pointed star; below are the Greek letters αωμη which stand for the founding year 1848. The fraternity's pledge pin is a white enamel five-pointed star.

The fraternity's coat of arms is a metallic gold shield with a purple chevron with three silver stars, between three red roses. Above the shield, the crest is a front-facing owl; below is a scroll with the fraternity's motto Φιλότης Γλυκυτάτη Δυναστεία.

The fraternity's colors are royal purple and white. Its flower is the purple clematis. Its flag features the Greek letters "ΦΓΔ" on a purple field, with a white star in the top right corner.

Phi Gamma Delta has chosen not to use the term alumni for members who have graduated; post-collegiate members are referred to as Graduate Brothers, to imply that membership extends past the undergraduate experience. The fraternity uses the motto "Not for College Days Alone" to signify this.

=== Publications ===
The fraternity's publication is The Phi Gamma Delta, was first issued in 1879 and has been published quarterly since then. The fraternity issues the Purple Pilgrim manual to all new members of the fraternity; it has been updated numerous times, most recently in 2024. It is available online to read for non-members.

=== Use of Greek letters and etymology of "FIJI" ===
Phi Gamma Delta limits the written display of its Greek letters. Under the fraternity's international bylaws, its chapters and members may only inscribe their letters in the following seven locations:

1. On a uniform diamond-shaped member badge
2. On memorials to deceased brothers
3. On the fraternity's official flag
4. On the fraternity's official seal
5. On a chapter house marker
6. On a brother's official college ring
7. On a brother's certificate of membership

In place of the actual Greek letters, "Fiji," "Phi Gam," or the English spelling "Phi Gamma Delta" is used in their place on objects such as apparel. The Fiji nickname started at New York University as a suggested name for the fraternity magazine (Fee Gee). It was officially adopted by the national fraternity at the 1894 convention in the belief that the term would be distinctive and appeal to the imagination. Before its formal appropriation by the organization at large, nicknames for members of the fraternity varied greatly; ranging from "Phi Gamm" and "Delta" by brothers across the nation, "Fee Gee" in New York, and "Gammas" in the South. Today, "Fiji" and "Phi Gam" are considered by the fraternity to be the only appropriate nicknames for Phi Gamma Delta members on the international scale, though local nicknames related to a chapter's Greek name or other colloquialisms do exist.

== Chapters ==
The fraternity is composed of two types of chapters. Most chapters serve primarily undergraduate students and are established at a single college or university. There are also chapters to serve members of the fraternity who have graduated and are established to serve a city or larger region.

== Membership ==
At the 174th Ekklesia in 2022, the fraternity began a process to officially abolish pledging in all of its chapters from July 1, 2024 onward, the seventh such Greek organization to do so. The fraternity cited the negative impact of hazing on fraternity membership as well as the example of other Greek organizations that had previously abolished the pledging process behind the change. Chapters are now required to initiate new members within four days of the acceptance of their bids.

== Activities ==
=== Fiji Islander ===
Built upon the "Fiji" nickname, many chapters hold an annual "Fiji Islander" party. These are typically large, tropical-themed festivities, often using banana and palm trees as decoration, although they can vary widely from chapter to chapter. Some are large parties where alcohol, sand, and tropical foliage are present. Others may be alcohol-free, and some are charity projects, rather than parties.

=== Honors and awards ===
Each year, the Phi Gamma Delta organization gives out several awards, both to chapters and to individual members.

=== Pig Dinner ===
The Frank Norris Pig Dinner is an annual graduate dinner held by all Phi Gamma Delta chapters. The dinner is named for author Frank Norris, a member of the chapter at the University of California, Berkeley, where the first Pig Dinner was held in 1893. Pig Dinner is sanctioned by the International Fraternity, and it serves to welcome graduate brothers back to their undergraduate chapters.

== Governance ==
The fraternity is governed by its archonate, consisting of officers that are elected at annual conventions called Ekklesia. Its international headquarters is in Lexington, Kentucky.

== Notable members ==
Phi Gamma Delta has had alumni active in a variety of fields such as the arts, business, entertainment, law, politics, and sports. A select group of famous fraternity alumni include:

- Scott Bakula (University of Kansas, 1977), actor on Quantum Leap, Murphy Brown, and Star Trek: Enterprise
- John Cappelletti (Pennsylvania State University, 1974), Heisman Trophy winner and College Football Hall of Fame inductee
- Johnny Carson (University of Nebraska–Lincoln, 1949), host of The Tonight Show Starring Johnny Carson and Presidential Medal of Freedom recipient
- Calvin Coolidge (Amherst College, 1895), 30th President of the United States and 29th Vice President of the United States
- Matthew Fox (Columbia University, 1989), actor on Party of Five, Lost, and We Are Marshall
- Phil Knight (University of Oregon, 1959), co-founder and chairman emeritus of Nike
- Robert McNamara (University of California, Berkeley, 1937), 8th United States Secretary of Defense and Presidential Medal of Freedom recipient
- Jack Nicklaus (Ohio State University, 1961), professional golfer, World Golf Hall of Fame inductee and Presidential Medal of Freedom recipient
- Norman Vincent Peale (Ohio Wesleyan University, 1920), Christian theologian, author of The Power of Positive Thinking and Presidential Medal of Freedom recipient
- Mike Pence (Hanover College, 1981), 48th Vice President of the United States and 50th Governor of Indiana
- Dean Smith (University of Kansas, 1977), two-time NCAA Division I men's basketball tournament champion as coach of the North Carolina Tar Heels men's basketball team, Basketball Hall of Fame inductee
- Morgan Spurlock (New York University, 1993), independent documentary film director of Super Size Me
- Jack Swigert (University of Colorado Boulder, 1953), NASA astronaut on Apollo 13, member-elect of the United States House of Representatives and Presidential Medal of Freedom recipient
- Zebulon Vance (University of North Carolina at Chapel Hill, 1852), United States Senator from North Carolina, 37th and 43rd Governor of North Carolina
- Byron White (University of Colorado Boulder, 1938), associate justice of the Supreme Court of the United States, College Football Hall of Fame inductee and Presidential Medal of Freedom recipient
- E. B. White (Cornell University, 1921), children's author of Stuart Little and Charlotte's Web, Pulitzer Prize recipient and Presidential Medal of Freedom recipient

== Controversies and member misconduct ==
=== Racism ===
The fraternity once used a mascot named "Fiji Man," a thick-lipped, dark-skinned man in a grass skirt, sometimes holding a spear or with a bone in his nose, in the style of a once-common Pacific Islander stereotype. Fraternity members built large sculptures of this racist caricature as a party decoration. The Phi Gamma Delta national organization has since banned Fiji Man, and now prohibits appearing in blackface at fraternity events. Despite this ban, however, some chapters continued to depict Fiji Man through the 1990s, which sparked controversy.

In 1979, members of the Theta Psi chapter at Colgate University constructed a Fiji Man snow sculpture in front of their chapter house. Members of the chapter quickly apologized for the incident, and they later hosted an open discussion forum on the campus regarding racism.

In 1987, the Mu chapter at the University of Wisconsin–Madison was suspended twice for racism. In May, it was closed because of a Fiji Islander party featuring a large caricature of a Pacific Islander with a bone through his nose. Eight days after it was reinstated, the chapter was closed again because two Phi Gamma Delta members entered Zeta Beta Tau, a majority-Jewish fraternity, where they began shoving and punching people. The members were charged with battery.

The Sigma Chi chapter at the University of Southern California held a "slave auction" with Fiji Man decorations in 1989, resulting in mandatory diversity training for the fraternity members. The woman who conducted the training characterized it as not one of her more successful efforts.

In 1989, members of the Tau Deuteron chapter at the University of Texas handed out t-shirts depicting Fiji Man, causing campus-wide apprehension about racism. The chapter again caused controversy in 1990, its members handed out t-shirts with a Little Black Sambo drawing during a basketball tournament. 500 students protested outside the fraternity house after the incident. In response, the chapter was temporarily suspended.

In the spring of 2023, two pledges of the Omega Phi chapter at the University of Central Florida were photographed blindfolded, with a Nazi symbol on their laps and a Ku Klux Klan "hat' on their heads. The photograph was anonymously reported to the university in 2025 and resulted in the interim suspension of the chapter.

=== Hazing ===
In 1997, at the Iota Mu chapter at the Massachusetts Institute of Technology, eighteen-year-old freshman Scott Krueger died as a result of excessive alcohol consumption as part of an allegedly mandatory hazing event. Manslaughter charges were brought against the Phi Gamma Delta organization itself, rather than any individuals. In response, the chapter was dissolved, and the case was suspended. MIT later settled with Krueger's family for $4.75 million. Krueger's story was adapted into Tell Me Something I Don't Know, an mini-documentary on the dangers of alcohol abuse among college students. The documentary won a Heartland Emmy Award in 2003.

In 1999, a nineteen-year-old pledge was tackled and taken to the Lambda Nu chapter house at the University of Nebraska–Lincoln, where he was handcuffed and forced to drink fifteen shots of brandy and whisky and three to six cans of beer over two and a half hours. He broke loose from the handcuffs and attempted to escape by sliding down a drainpipe from a third-story window. He fell and suffered head injuries. The incident led to the Nebraska Legislature making hazing a crime. In a resulting lawsuit, the Nebraska Supreme Court ruled that the university should have taken more steps to protect the student, as the university was aware of a pattern of hazing, sexual assault, and other problems at the Phi Gamma Delta house.

In 2006, nineteen-year-old Danny Daniels was found dead in the Phi Chi chapter house at Fresno State University, prompting an investigation and immediate suspension of the chapter. It was found that the fraternity hosted a large party the night before, and that members forced Daniels to drink large amounts of alcohol for initiation. Once he became sick, a few of his fraternity brothers carried him to a secluded room at the fraternity and left him. Daniels died in the early morning of January 8 from acute alcohol intoxication, and later tests showed that Daniels had a blood-alcohol level of 0.34, more than four times the legal limit. The university suspended the chapter for five years.

On September 17, 2010, Matt Fritzie, a pledge at the Pi Deuteron chapter at the University of Kansas, was partially paralyzed after diving into a shallow pool during a Fiji Islander party hosted by the chapter. The university placed the chapter on a two-year probation for hazing. Fritzie has since sued both the chapter and the national organization.

On April 4, 2014, Michael Evan Anderson, a member of the Upsilon Alpha chapter at the University of Arizona, died after an unsanctioned Phi Gamma Delta event when he fell 20 feet (6 m) from the top of an air conditioning unit onto the roof of his dormitory. The investigation of his death by the university police led to an investigation from the Dean of Students Office, which included several counts of hazing, including kicking new members in the stomach, new members cleaning the house before and after parties, and performing personal acts of servitude to members. The chapter was suspended for four years before being reestablished in 2018.

In 2015, five members of the Theta chapter at the University of Alabama were arrested after an investigation into hazing, where fraternity members required pledges to stand in buckets of ice and salt, resulting in severe injuries.

In 2017, the fraternity at the University of Nebraska–Lincoln was suspended by the university until 2020 for reckless alcohol use, hazing pledges, and inappropriate sexually based behavior, including a pattern of sexually harassing conduct.

In 2021, freshman pledge Daniel Santulli became unresponsive after being was forced to drink excessive amounts of alcohol at an event at the Chi Mu chapter at the University of Missouri,. Fraternity brothers delayed getting medical treatment for Santulli for fear of legal repercussions. As a result, Santulli is not able to speak, see, or walk. The university suspended the fraternity, followed by the fraternity's board closing the chapter. Two FIJI members were charged with felony hazing. In 2025, "Danny’s Law" went into effect in Missouri, guaranteeing immunity for 911 callers in the event of a hazing injury.

In 2022, the Beta Gamma chapter at Bowling Green State University was suspended by the university after an investigation revealed hazing and underage drinking by the group.

In 2022, the Pi Deuteron chapter at the University of Kansas was suspended for several years due to extreme verbal, emotional, and physical abuse of pledges. One pledge reported to authorities that his entire pledge class was "under the control and authority of members every waking minute each day" during the fall 2021 semester.

In 2025, the Nu Omega chapter at Oklahoma University was suspended for several months and required to attend anti-hazing and alcohol safety workshops at the university. According to official investigation reports, the chapter was found guilty of multiple university policy violations, including alcohol violations, disorderly conduct, drug possession, hazing and physical harm to pledges. Some of the hazing included making pledges eat whole raw onions and eat sandwiches covered in tobacco dip spit and filled with tobacco dip.

=== Sexual assault ===
On January 21, 2017, Phi Gamma Delta fraternity members at University of Nebraska–Lincoln were claimed to have screamed pro-rape slurs at participants of the 2017 Women's March. Chants of "no means yes, yes means anal" were allegedly aimed at thousands of women, children, and men walking past the fraternity house on the University of Nebraska–Lincoln campus. Fraternity members were accused on social media of waving Donald Trump signs, screaming "grab them by the pussy," and then announcing which marchers they would and would not want to "grab by the pussy". Multiple protesters have said that they heard the fraternity members chanting, which a spokesperson for the fraternity has denied. One week later, a protest was held outside the fraternity's chapter house. The protest was attended by about fifty people, including Antifa members who flung tampons dipped in red paint at the building. The fraternity was suspended from UNL from March 2017 to May 2020 because of "a pattern of sexually harassing conduct" and other patterns of misconduct. The chapter was accused of further sexual misconduct in October 2019.

A member of the Kappa Tau chapter at the University of Tennessee was accused of drugging and raping two women during a party at the fraternity in November 2018. The accused apologized to one of the women in a text message. A search warrant was issued for the fraternity house in connection with the alleged rapes. The accused member was suspended from the fraternity and moved out of the house, but was not arrested. The fraternity chapter was temporarily suspended in December 2018. In January 2019, the fraternity chapter agreed to social probation until May 1 for alcohol violations and for violating previous university sanctions related to alcohol and hazing; its members were required to participate in university training related to alcohol consumption and sexual assault.

A federal lawsuit filed by a Butler University student in 2019 describes being raped by a member of the Psi chapter at Wabash College while she was intoxicated during a Phi Gamma Delta party. She told her attacker to stop and attempted to escape while blacking out repeatedly. Other members of the chapter tried to prevent the woman's friends from finding her as she was being raped, according to the lawsuit. The woman stated that Crawfordsville, Indiana police told her that Wabash College has no formal code of conduct and that the student who assaulted her would face few consequences, so they encouraged her not to pursue the complaint.

A sexual assault of a seventeen-year old girl was reported to University of Nebraska–Lincoln police on August 24, 2021, as having been committed by a Phi Gamma Delta member. A sexual misconduct charge against the chapter had been filed in October 2019 and was still open at the time. Hundreds of protesters converged on the fraternity house, calling for an end to rape on campus and for the chapter to be shut down. Fraternity members stayed inside the house and shared a video via the Internet of them laughing at the protestors outside the window. The next day, chancellor Ronnie Green announced that the university would be closing the fraternity house and suspending the chapter while the allegation of sexual assault was investigated. An online petition calling for the chapter's closure received more than 291,700 signatures. Campus protests against Phi Gamma Delta continued through the two weeks, with thousands of protesters. State senator Megan Hunt spoke at one protest. During the week of protests, university police received an influx of reports of rape; many were previously unreported events from years ago. In October 2021, the chapter of Phi Gamma Delta was suspended by both the university and the national fraternity until 2026 because of alcohol violations, not because of the protests or ongoing sexual assault investigation. The accused dropped out of school and was removed from the fraternity. Charges were not filed, and there was no arrest in the alleged rape case. The fraternity returned to the UNL campus in September 2025.

In August 2021, a woman reported that she was raped while intoxicated at the Mu Deuteron chapter at University of Iowa on September 5, 2020. The chapter was suspended during the university's investigation. University of Iowa students protested in front of the chapter's house, demanding that the chapter be permanently closed. An online petition about the alleged sexual assault received more than 40,000 signatures. The victim filed a civil lawsuit against the chapter and one member, claiming that the sexual assault was photographed and shared on social media. The accused fraternity member maintained that it was a consensual encounter. The lawsuit was resolved during mediation, with the woman requesting that the state drop criminal charges related to the video.

== See also ==
- List of social fraternities
