= Tau Gamma Phi =

Filipino college fraternity

- ΤΓΦ
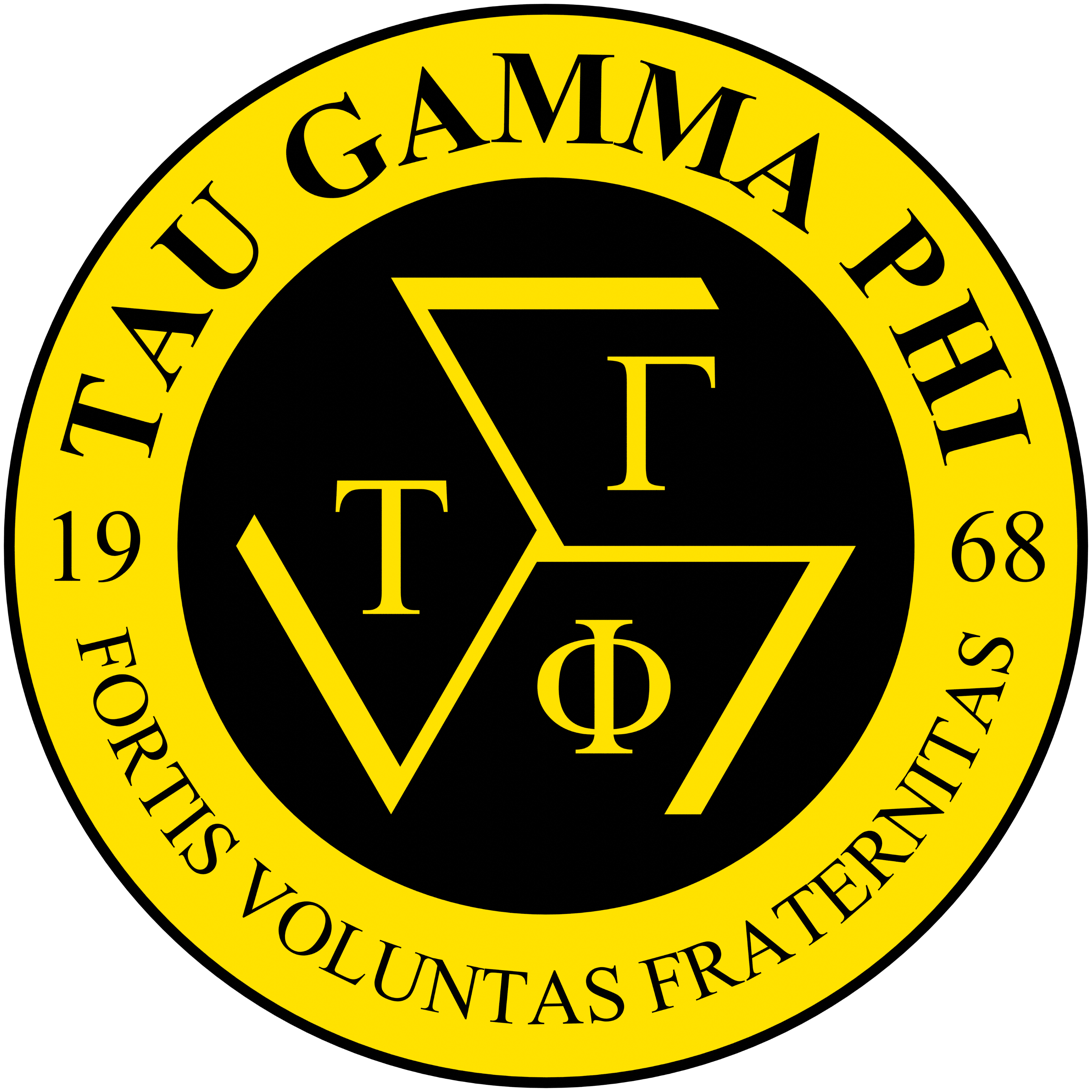
- Founded: October 4, 1968; 58 years ago University of the Philippines
- Type: Traditional
- Affiliation: Independent
- Status: Active
- Emphasis: Leadership and Brotherhood
- Scope: National and International
- Motto: "A Triskelion firmly believes in the power of reason, not in the use of force as reason."
- Pillars: Fortis Voluntas Fraternitas; Strength, Freewill and Brotherhood
- Colors: Gold and Black
- Symbol: Triskelion (general)
- Nickname: Triskelions
- Headquarters: Philippines

Tau Gamma Phi (ΤΓΦ), also known as Triskelions’ Grand Fraternity, is a fraternity established in the Philippines. Its members call themselves Triskelions.

Tau Gamma Phi is one of the largest fraternities in the Philippines in terms of membership. It has a sister sorority, Tau Gamma Sigma (ΤΓΣ), also known as the Triskelions' Grand Sorority.

== History ==
The fraternity was founded on October 4, 1968, by students from the University of the Philippines Diliman. Initially known as the "Order of the U.P. Triskelions", the organization later on changed its name to the "Order of the Grand Triskelions", then later "Triskelions Grand Fraternity" which was then changed into the Greek letter name Tau Gamma Phi, in line with other student fraternities.

In 1969, the fraternity established a chapter at the Philippine Maritime Institute. This was followed in 1970 by chapters at FEATI University, Mapúa Institute of Technology, and National University, in 1971 with a chapter at University of Santo Tomas, and in 1973 with chapters at Adamson University and the National College of Business Administration.

When martial law was declared on September 21, 1972 by President Ferdinand Marcos, some university organizations including Tau Gamma Phi became targets of military harassment, believing that these school organizations posed a threat to the Marcos regime.

With martial law hindering most of its activities, the fraternity faced a decline in recruitment. In 1975, the fraternity explored the idea of including younger members. Recruitment began in the high school sector with the Junior Tau Gamma Phi (also known as the Triskelion Youth Movement) founded at San Beda College–High School on February 7, 1974.

The fraternity celebrated its 45th founding anniversary in 2013, with President Benigno Aquino III offering an official message of congratulations to the organization.

== Symbols ==
The fraternity's colors are gold which represents "light", and black which represents "darkness". Its symbol is the Triskelion. Its pillars are Fortis Voluntas Fraternitas (Strength, Freewill and Brotherhood).

== Controversies ==
=== Hazing ===
Although the fraternity has released a public statement declaring the organization has a "no hazing" policy, several hazing deaths allegedly linked to the fraternity have been reported.

In a 2012 interview, Tau Gamma Phi founder Vedasto “Tito” Venida condemned the fraternity's practice of hazing, adding that the organization has already "taken so many innocent lives." In 2015, after the hazing death of a Western Mindanao State University student, the fraternity released a statement calling on all chapters to abide by their fraternity motto Primum Nil Nocere or "First, Do No Harm" and commit to avoid violence related to hazing. Despite the appeal, at least seven more hazing deaths have been reported since then.

==== List of confirmed hazing deaths ====
According to the ABS-CBN Investigative and Research Group, Tau Gamma Phi has the highest number of recorded hazing deaths among all Filipino fraternities, with twenty deaths as of March 1, 2026.

Date of death	Institution/Location	Victim	References
March 3, 2006	Technological University of the Philippines	Clark Anson Silverio	
August 18, 2006	Pamantasan ng Lungsod ng Muntinlupa	Dennis Africa	
January 28, 2007	Central Luzon State University	Mark Rodriguez	
March 11, 2007	Palawan State University, Puerto Princesa City	Ronald Sequeña	
August 2, 2008	Enverga University	Chester Paulo Abracias	
August 21, 2009	Holy Cross of Davao College	Karl Anthony Gaudicos	(With Tau Gamma Sigma)
October 22, 2009	Lyceum of the Philippines University–Cavite	John Daniel Samparanda	
October 27, 2010	DepEd Alternative Learning System	Noel Borja Jr.	
September 15, 2011	Notre Dame of Tacurong College	Nor Silongan	
June 28, 2014	De La Salle–College of Saint Benilde	Guillo Servando	
November 2, 2014	Southern Luzon State University	Ariel Inofre	
September 30, 2015	Western Mindanao State University	Anthony Javier	
February 16, 2020	Solis Institute of Technology, Bulan, Sorsogon	Omer Despabiladeras	
November 16, 2020	Barangay San Jose Gusu, Zamboanga City	Joselito Envidiado	
March 20, 2022	Barangay Longos, Kalayaan, Laguna	Reymarc Rabutazo	
December 19, 2022	University of Cebu	Ronnel Masamoc Baguio	
February 18, 2023	Adamson University	John Matthew Salilig	
October 16, 2023	Philippine College of Criminology	Ahldryn Lery Bravante	
September 30, 2024	Jaen, Nueva Ecija	Ren Joseph Bayan	
March 1, 2026	Dasmariñas, Cavite	Kenneth Alcedo	

=== Rivalry with Alpha Phi Omega ===
Tau Gamma Phi has been involved in several fatal clashes with long-standing rival fraternity Alpha Phi Omega (APO):

- On August 30, 1977, UP Diliman student and APO member Rolando Abad was killed in a clash with rival members of Tau Gamma Phi.
- On February 21, 1994, Central Colleges of the Philippines (CCP) student Fernando Obrino, a member of Tau Gamma Phi, died at St. Luke's Medical Center after being mauled by four members of APO (also students of CCP) in Cubao, Quezon City.
- On October 24, 2004, police found the body of 33-year-old Ronaldo De Guzman on a bench outside National University in Manila. De Guzman was an elder of the Scouts Royale Brotherhood, which police identified as the youth arm of Alpha Phi Omega. Witnesses reported four gunmen, who were identified as members of Tau Gamma Phi, threatening the younger members before shooting De Guzman three times in the face.
- On March 20, 2008, a grenade targeting members of Tau Gamma Phi exploded in front of La Consolacion College Manila, leaving 22 people injured. Police blamed fraternity rivalry as the motive behind the explosion, but initially refused to identify the perpetrators' organization. On November 9, 2010, then-justice secretary Leila de Lima tagged APO as the culprit in the grenade attack.
- On December 18, 2009, San Sebastian College student and APO member Cromwell Duka, Jr. was fatally stabbed in the school cafeteria by fellow student Efrain Lim, a member of Tau Gamma Phi.

Police investigators also believe that Tau Gamma Phi members were the intended targets of the grenade that exploded in the 2010 Philippine Bar exam bombing, that injured 47 people. One member of Alpha Phi Omega was indicted for the crime.

=== Rivalry with Alpha Kappa Rho ===
Since 1990, Tau Gamma Phi's rivalry with Alpha Kappa Rho (AKRHO), particularly in Cebu, has escalated to the point where police and local government officials have intervened and organized peace talks several times between the two fraternities: in 2002 by the Cebu City government, in 2005 by the Cebu provincial government, and in 2006 by the Cebu Provincial Police Office.

Documented cases of clashes and killings between the two fraternities include the following:

- In 2003, the provincial vice president of AKRHO was murdered by alleged Tau Gamma Phi members along Sanciangko Street in Cebu City. Tau Gamma chapter president Jayber Oyon-Oyon was arrested in suspicion of the murder.
- On August 6, 2005, a Tau Gamma Phi chapter president was shot and killed by an unknown assailant in Lapu-Lapu City. Police tagged fraternity rivalry with AKRHO as the primary motive for the killing. Before the shooting, Tau Gamma Phi members were allegedly warned AKRHO was planning to kill someone as halad (sacrifice) for their anniversary on August 8.
- On August 28, 2005, a Tau Gamma Phi member was shot by a fugitive AKRHO member in Cebu City.
- On October 4, 2007, several alleged members of Tau Gamma Phi were killed and wounded in a drive-by shooting perpetrated by Aristotle Aves, whom the Cebu police have tagged as an AKRHO hitman. Because the shooting coincided with Tau Gamma Phi's anniversary, police believe that it was in retaliation for a 2006 shooting incident that killed an AKRHO member during their anniversary celebrations.
- On June 5, 2022, Tau Gamma Phi fratmen shot and wounded a member of AKRHO after an altercation between the groups in Minglanilla, Cebu.

Several other cases of Tau Gamma Phi and AKRHO members being murdered in Cebu have been documented, however, the identity of the perpetrators and motive could not be positively identified or have been intentionally withheld.

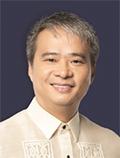
Joel Villanueva

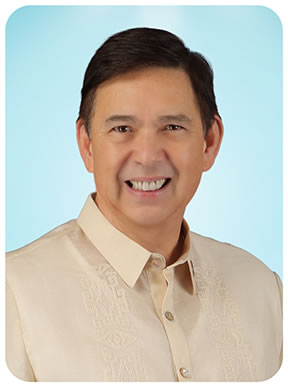
Ralph Recto

== Notable members ==
- Alvin Aguilar – martial artist and founder of DEFTAC Philippines
- Raymond Almazan – professional basketball player for the Meralco Bolts
- Bong Alvarez – retired professional basketball player
- Jobert Austria – actor and comedian
- Nathan Azarcon – musician and founding member of Rivermaya and Bamboo
- John Riel Casimero – professional boxer
- Vicente Danao - retired PNP officer
- JM de Guzman – actor, model, and singer
- JC Intal – former professional basketball player
- Pancho Magno – television actor
- Jiro Manio – film and television actor
- Luis Manzano – host, actor, comedian, VJ, and model
- Jao Mapa – film and television actor and painter
- Rommel Marbil - former PNP Chief
- Eumir Marcial – Olympic-medal winning boxer
- Joseph Marco – actor, model and singer
- Lito Mayo – graphic artist and printmaker
- Buwi Meneses – bassist for Parokya ni Edgar and formerly for Franco
- Vhong Navarro – comedian, actor, dancer, recording artist, and television host
- Victor Neri – actor, singer, and chef
- Diether Ocampo – actor, singer, model, and military officer
- RJ Padilla – film and television actor
- Ion Perez – actor, model, and television host
- Vandolph Quizon – actor, comedian and councilor of the 1st district of Parañaque
- Ralph G. Recto – finance secretary, former senator and representative of the 6th district of Batangas
- Oyo Boy Sotto – film and television actor
- Jose "Bong" Teves Jr. – Deputy Majority Leader of the House of Representatives
- TJ Trinidad – film and television actor
- Joel Villanueva – incumbent senator

== See also ==
- Tau Gamma Sigma
- List of fraternities and sororities in the Philippines
