= Forest Lake Memorial Parks =

Network of memorial parks in the Philippines

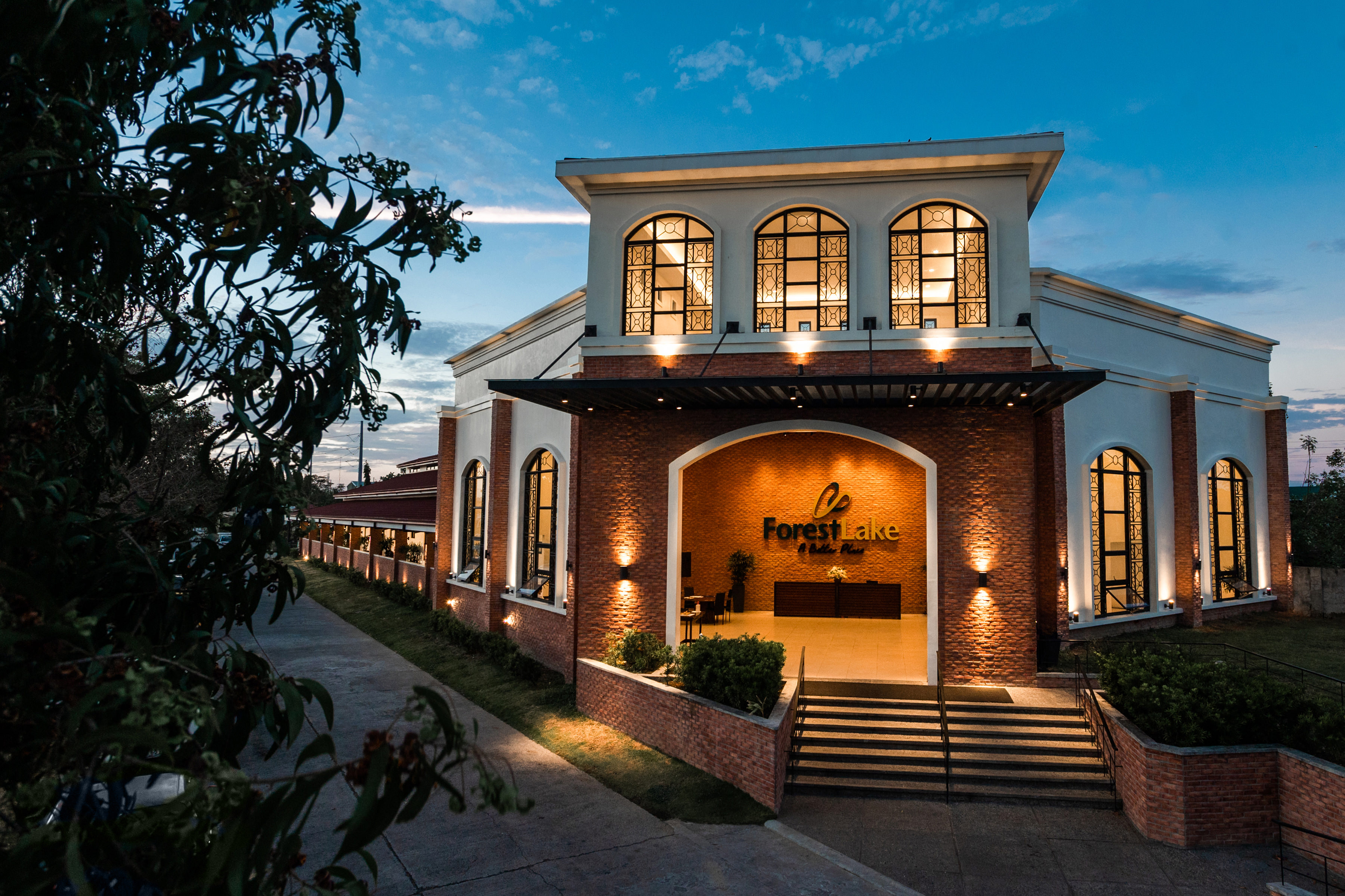
- Forest Lake Memorial Parks' deluxe chapel in Binan Laguna

Details
- Established: 1997
- Location: Parañaque, Metro Manila
- Country: Philippines
- Owned by: Forest Lake Development, Inc.
- Website: forestlakeparks.com

Forest Lake Memorial Parks is a network of memorial parks in the Philippines. With over 25 years of service, the company has grown to become the largest memorial park developer in the country, with a presence across Luzon, Visayas, and Mindanao.

== Notable interments ==
Forest Lake Memorial Parks is the final resting place for several notable individuals. Among those laid to rest in their grounds are:

- John Matthew Salilig, a hazing victim, at Forest Lake Memorial Park in Barangay Tumaga, Zamboanga City.
- First Lt. Karl Joseph Hintay, a hero pilot of the Philippine Air Force, at Forest Lake Memorial Park in Barangay Maa, Davao City.
- Christine Angelica Dacera, a flight attendant whose case garnered national attention, at Forest Lake Memorial Park in General Santos City.
- Angelyn Aguirre, an Overseas Filipino Worker (OFW) who was honored for her heroism, at Forest Lake in San Carlos City, Pangasinan.
- Victims of the Maguindanao massacre, one of the deadliest attacks on journalists worldwide. On November 23, 2009, 58 people were killed, including 32 journalists and media workers. A mass grave at Forest Lake Memorial Park in General Santos City holds some of these victims, such as Marife Montano, Gina de la Cruz, Marites Cablitas, Eleanor Dalmacio, Ian Subang, Rubell Bataluna, Russel Morales, and Ronnie Perante. The park has been a site for commemoration activities and continues to be a place where families and friends gather to honor their memory and call for justice.
