= Delta Chi =

North American collegiate fraternity

- ΔΧ
- Founded: October 13, 1890; 135 years ago Cornell University
- Type: Social
- Affiliation: NIC
- Status: Active
- Scope: North America
- Motto: Leges "Law"
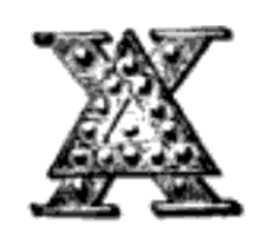
- Member badge
- Colors: Red and Buff
- Symbol: The Knight, Martlets
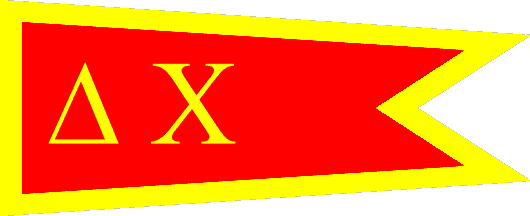
- Flag
- Flower: White carnation
- Publication: Delta Chi Quarterly
- Philanthropy: V Foundation for Cancer Research
- Chapters: 108 active
- Colonies: 14
- Members: 127,256+ lifetime
- Nickname: D-Chi
- Headquarters: 3845 N Meridian St. Indianapolis, Indiana 46208; United States
- Website: deltachi.org

Delta Chi (ΔΧ) is an international collegiate social fraternity. It was formed in 1890 at Cornell University as a professional fraternity for law students, becoming a social fraternity in 1922. In 1929, Delta Chi became one of the first international fraternities to abolish "hell week". It is a charter member of the North American Interfraternity Conference (NIC). Delta Chi has initiated over 116,000 members at over 110 chapters.

== History ==
=== Founding ===
According to Frederick Moore Whitney, two or three groups were working on the idea of a new law fraternity during the spring of 1889. After the class election, there were meetings held in Myron McKee Crandall's apartment as well as in Monroe Marsh Sweetland's law office. It is not clear how these two groups came together, though there seem to have been some individuals who had attended both groups.

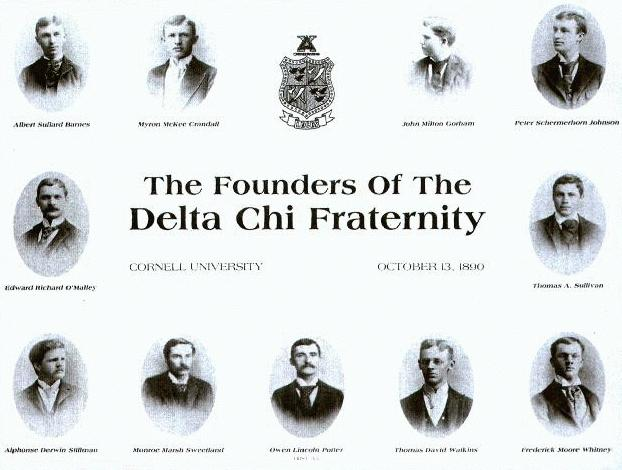
The founders of the Delta Chi Fraternity

Over the summer of 1890, many of the details of the organization were worked out by Myron Mckee Crandall, who had stayed in Ithaca until after school opened. Regarding the adoption of the constitution, Albert Sullard Barnes wrote the following in a 1907 Quarterly article:

As I recall it, after refreshing my recollection from the original minutes now in my possession, on the evening of October 13, 1890, six students in the Law School, Brothers John M. Gorham, Thomas J. Sullivan, F.K. Stephens, A.D. Stillman and the writer, together with Myron Crandall and O.L. Potter, graduate students, and Monroe Sweetland, a former Student in the Law School, met in a brother's room and adopted the constitution and by-laws, and organized the Delta Chi Fraternity.

Its founding fathers were Albert Sullard Barnes, Myron McKee Crandall, John Milton Gorham, Peter Schermerhorn Johnson, Edward Richard O'Malley, Owen Lincoln Potter, Alphonse Derwin Stillman, Thomas Allen Joseph Sullivan, Monroe Marsh Sweetland, Thomas David Watkins, and Frederick Moore Whitney. Potter was the first president.

The fraternity was recognized by Cornell on October 13, 1890, now considered the group's founding date. Stillman wrote the fraternity's ritual, which was adopted at a meeting on October 20, 1890. A second chapter was established at New York University in 1891. This was followed by chapters at the University of Minnesota, DePauw University, and the University of Michigan in 1892. The fraternity held its first national convention in 1894, continuing to hold conventions annually through 1911.

In 1909, at the 15th convention in Ithaca, New York, Delta Chi adopted an amendment to the constitution prohibiting dual membership in multiple fraternities. As a professional law fraternity, Delta Chi had originally allowed members from other general fraternities to join. The change in policy led to the loss of chapters in New York Law School, West Virginia University, Northwestern University, and Washington University in St. Louis.

In 1930, Delta Chi had chartered 42 chapters, 15 alumni chapters, and had initiated 8,301 members. It had 36 active chapters, with 29 of those owning a chapter house.

=== General fraternity ===
During World War I, a majority of the members of the active chapters enlisted in the armed forces. Chapter houses became almost deserted, and a convention in August 1917 was skipped. At the end of the war, members returned to the universities to complete their courses. Chapter finances were generally in bad condition, as were the houses. Attempting to rebuild, many chapters stretched the recruiting restrictions by initiating men who had no intention of studying law.

Starting in 1919 at the 20th convention, the issue of becoming a general social fraternity was debated. In 1921, in Columbus, Ohio at the 21st convention, two amendments were proposed, for and against general membership, respectively. For three days, votes were held, until (on a swing vote by the Buffalo Alumni chapter representative), the Wadsworth amendment was adopted. The amendment made Delta Chi a general fraternity, no longer requiring its members to be law students.

== Symbols ==
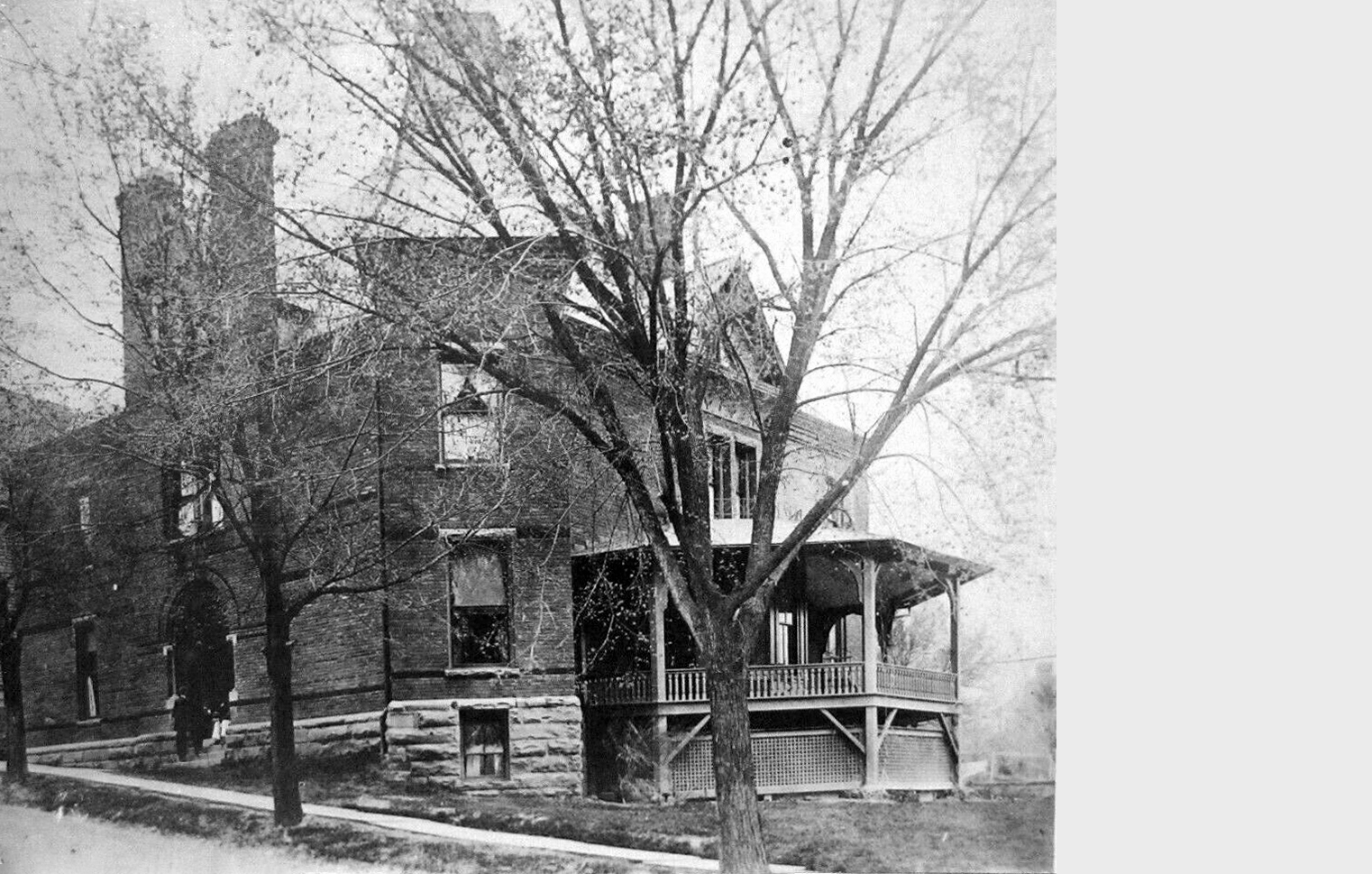
Delta Chi house at Cornell University in Ithaca, New York, in 1906

Delta Chi's badge is a monogram of the Greek letters ΔΧ. The Δ can either be in black enamel or set with stones. The pledge pin is shaped like a Δ in red and gold buff, with a gold Chi in the lower background.

Delta Chi's motto is Leges (Law). The fraternity's colors are red and buff. Its symbol is the knight and the martlets. Its flower is the white carnation. Its magazine is Delta Chi Quarterly, first published in April 1903. Its nickname is D-Chi.

== Philanthropy ==
In 2006, the fraternity named the V Foundation as its official philanthropic organization. Delta Chi has raised over one million dollars for the V Foundation.

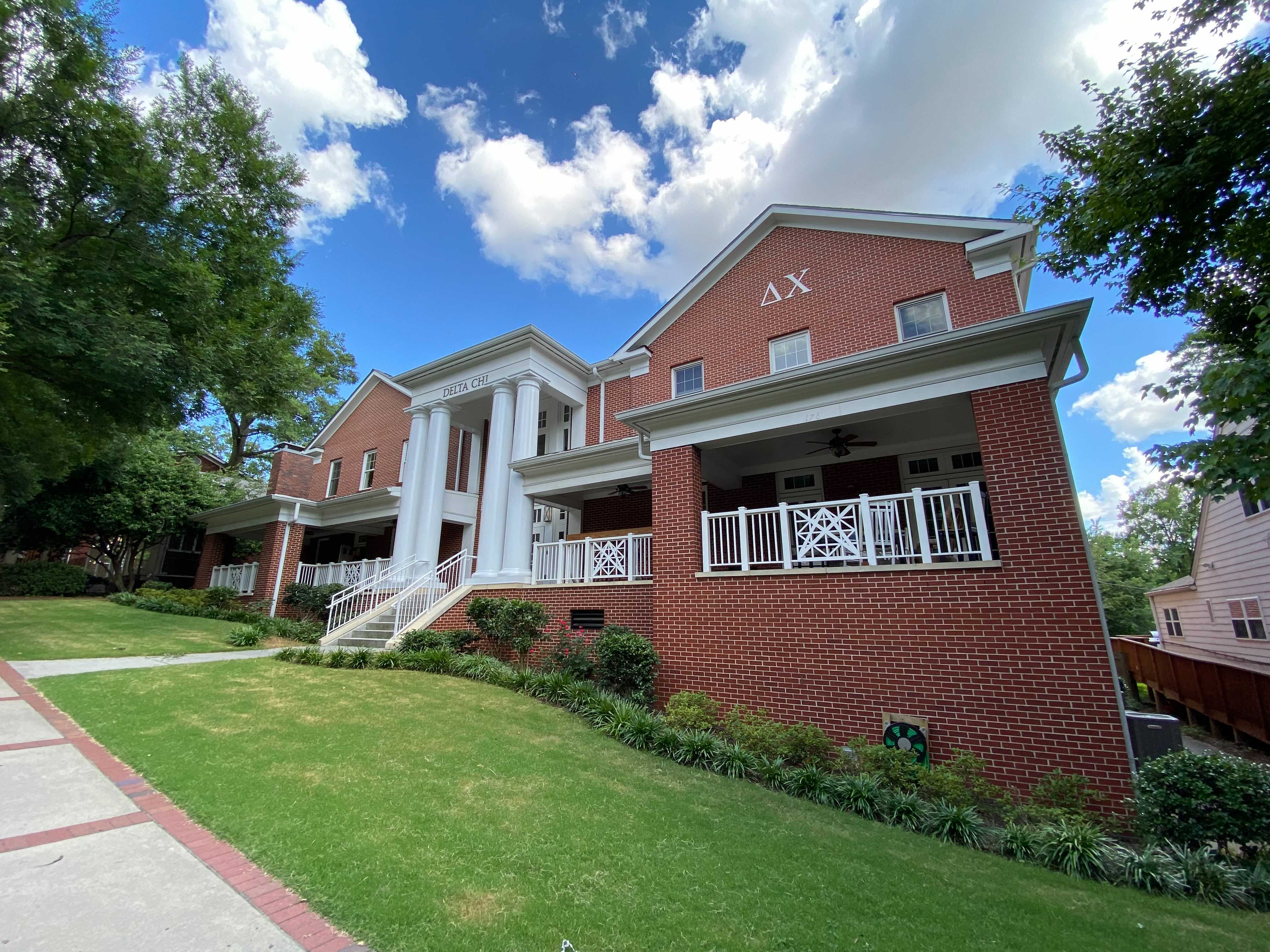
Delta Chi chapter house at Georgia Tech

== Organization ==
Delta Chi's headquarters is in Indianapolis, Indiana. Its international officers are referred to by double letters, including the AA (president), CC (secretary), and DD (treasurer). There is also a Housing Corporation to manage chapter or provisional chapter housing facilities and all legal responsibilities of such management. The Housing Corporation is a separate, incorporated legal entity.

The undergraduate officers are designated by single letters, including A (president), B (vice president), C (secretary), D (treasurer), E (historian), F (sergeant at arms).

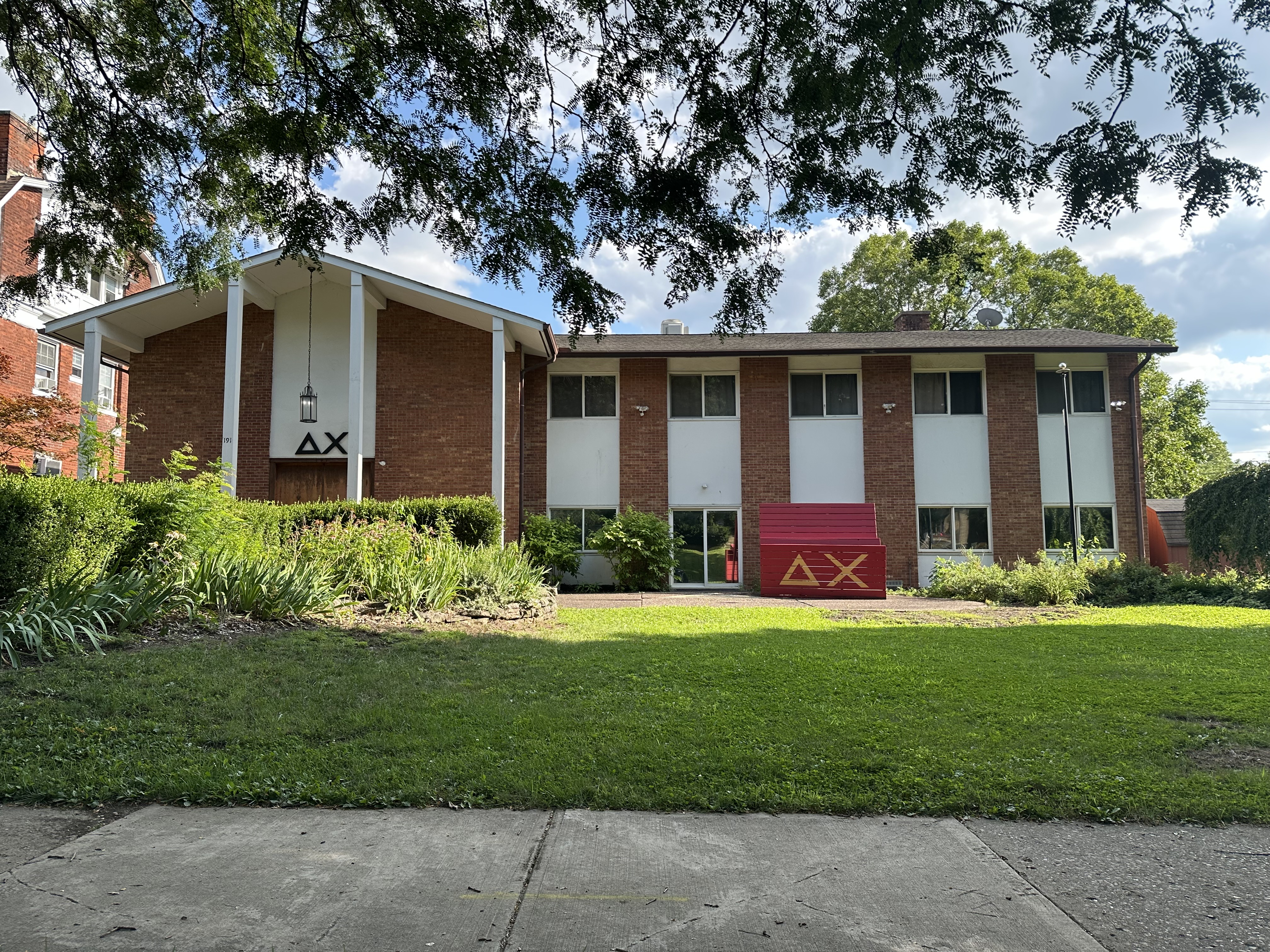
Delta Chi chapter house at Ohio State University

== Chapters ==
Delta Chi has chartered more than 110 chapters. Delta Chi chapters and provisional chapters (colonies) are named by institution, and sometimes by self-naming. Therefore, its first chapter is known as the Cornell Chapter.

== Notable members ==
Delta Chi has initiated more than 127,200 members.

== Local chapter misconduct ==
In February 2021, Virginia Commonwealth University's chapter was suspended after freshman Adam Oakes died of alcohol poisoning after an off-campus fraternity party. The VCU chapter was later expelled from the university three months after Oakes's death, after the university found that the chapter had violated several university policies, including those on hazing and alcohol.

On January 25, 2026, the University of Michigan's chapter was suspended after sophomore Lucas Mattson was found dead on January 24th.

In May 2026, a fraternity member at Louisiana State University turned himself in to the local police for a rape at the fraternity house.

== See also ==
- List of social fraternities
