= Alpha Kappa Rho =

Filipino service fraternity and sorority

- ακρ
- Founded: August 8, 1973; 53 years ago University of Santo Tomas
- Type: Traditional
- Affiliation: Independent
- Status: Active
- Emphasis: Service
- Scope: International
- Motto: Vincit Omnia Veritas "Truth Conquers All"
- Colors: Red Yellow White
- Chapters: 22
- Nicknames: Skeptrons, AKRHO
- Headquarters: Manila; Philippines
- Website: alphakapparho.org

The Alpha Kappa Rho International Humanitarian Service Fraternity and Sorority (ακρ or AKRHO) is a fraternity established in the Philippines in 1973. The fraternity, comprising men and women from different universities, was originally established to promote loyalty, unity, and integrity in the fraternity amongst its members. It is registered as an International Humanitarian Service Fraternity and Sorority which encourages members to be involved in humanitarian projects and service worldwide. The fraternity is registered with the Philippine Securities and Exchange Commission as a non-profit and non-dividend corporation. AKRHO claims to have chapters worldwide.

Members of Alpha Kappa Rho have participated in a series of hazing events and inter-fraternity violence, documented since the early 2000s.

== History ==
The Alpha Kappa Rho Fraternity and Sorority was founded on August 8, 1973, by sixteen college students of the University of Santo Tomas (UST) College of Commerce. Its founding fathers were:

- Ted Aves
- Philip Balangue
- Tanny Bernabe
- James Bracewell
- Monchet Cabrera
- Jose Chua
- Teddy De Lara
- Philip Diman
- Ato Go
- Arnel Lorenzo
- Noli Manalo
- Obet Posadas
- Mark Queyquep
- Edwin Solano
- Roger Sarmiento
- Gil Villegas

The fraternity was founded on August 8 because this was the feast day of Saint Dominic, which was a university holiday at UST.

In 1976, Alpha Kappa Rho merged with the Omega Fraternity & Sorority International (OFSI) of San Sebastian College and Zeta Upsilon Fraternity of the University of the East. The merged fraternities adopted the initiation rites of OFSI, which included using a heated coin to apply a circular burn mark on the back of a member's right wrist.

In 1993, Alpha Kappa Rho was featured prominently in the action film Tikboy Tikas at mga Khroaks Boys, starring AKRHO member Zoren Legaspi.

It is registered as an International Humanitarian Service Fraternity and Sorority which encourages members to be involved in humanitarian projects and service In 2014, President Benigno Aquino III published an official message congratulating the fraternity on its 41st anniversary.

== Symbols ==
The fraternity adopted the motto Vincit Omnia Veritas (Truth Conquers All) based on the emblem of the UST. Its members are called "Skeptrons", a Greek word for the ceremonial staff carried by a monarch as a symbol of sovereignty. Its colors are red, yellow, and white.

== Related groups ==
=== Sorority ===
During 1975 Alpha Kappa Rho Sorority was founded by:

- Girlie Tesoro
- Joyce Gregorio
- Alda Alteveros Bernabe
- Marisa Comuyog
- JJ Aquino
- Irene Ileto

=== Junior AKRHO ===
In August 1975, AKRHO grew in numbers with the acceptance of high school students from the University of the East Recto campus (UE-Recto) into the fraternity. The first Junior AKRHO was headed by Jun "Labo" Pasaporte, Rey Quitariano (another NDM alumni) and Noriel Arcadio. They began the Junior AKRHO at the High School of University of the East. Other junior chapters were soon established in the Far Eastern University, Jose Rizal College High School, Philippine School of Business Administration, and National College of Business and Arts.

== Chapters ==
AKRHO claims to have chapters worldwide. Following are some of these chapters.

=== Collegiate ===
- University of Santo Tomas
- San Sebastian College
- University of the East

=== High school ===
- High School of University of the East
- Far Eastern University
- Jose Rizal College High School
- Philippine School of Business Administration
- National College of Business and Art

=== Councils ===
- Australia, Darwin Council
- Australia, Sydney Council
- Australia, Melbourne Council
- Australia, Darwin Council
- Bahrain Council
- Brunei, BSB Council
- Canada Southern Ontario Council
- Canada East Central Council
- Canada Western Vancouver Council
- Hong Kong Council
- Italy Council
- Japan Council
- Japan Nippon Council
- Saudi Arabia Eastern Council
- Saudi Arabia Central Council
- Saudi Arabia Western Council
- Saudi Arabia Southern Council
- Kuwait Council
- Malaysia Council Council
- Malaysia Silangor Council
- New Zealand Council
- Oman Council
- Papua New Guinea Council
- Poland Council
- Qatar Council
- Taiwan Council
- Taiwan Kaoshiong Council
- UAE Dubai Council
- UAE Abu Dhabi Council
- United Kingdom Council
- USA Northern California Council
- USA Southern California Council

== Member and chapter misconduct ==
=== Hazing ===
Although Alpha Kappa Rho has publicly claimed that it does not practice hazing in its initiation rites, at least three people are confirmed to have died from AKRHO's hazing rituals since 2009.

According to news reports, neophytes are subjected to "150 blows" with a wooden paddle which is then capped by the ceremonial burning of the circular scar on the right wrist using a coin (or the bottom of a metal permanent marker) wrapped in cigarette foil pressed into the skin three times while the applicant chants "I will protect the name of Alpha Kappa Rho."

On October 2, 2009, 17-year-old John Vincent Bernat, a student of Northern Mindanao State Institute of Science and Technology, underwent the initiation rites of AKRHO. Bernat was rushed to a hospital immediately after but died of infection and hemorrhage two days later. At least one AKRHO member was arrested.

On June 9, 2013, police raided the house of an AKRHO chapter president in Barangay Pardo, Cebu City after neighbors reported screaming inside a house. Police found two men with swollen buttocks and thighs, as well as a 30-inch wooden paddle bearing the logo of the fraternity. Two AKRHO members were arrested but were later released when the victims refused to file charges.

On August 9, 2020, Robert John Limpioso Fernandez, a 22-year-old tricycle driver from Barangay Cananlipa, Surigao City, was declared dead on arrival after complaining of breathing difficulties. Fernandez had attended the AKRHO anniversary celebrations and was believed to have undergone initiation rites because of the bruises and burn marks found on his body.

On September 18, 2022, 19-year-old criminology student August Caezar Saplot of the University of Mindanao died of serious injuries after undergoing AKRHO's initiation rites. Police arrested eight AKRHO members and conducted manhunt operations for six other members who escaped.

=== Fraternity violence ===
Alpha Kappa Rho is known to have a long-standing rivalry with Tau Gamma Phi that has flared into street fights that resulted in deaths in the early 2000s, particularly in the province of Cebu. Animosity between the two fraternities began in 1990, which escalated to the point where the police and local government of Cebu City summoned the leaders of the two fraternities in February 2002 to forge formal peace accords.

In 2003, the accord broke down when a provincial vice president of Alpha Kappa Rho was murdered by alleged Tau Gamma Phi members along Sanciangko Street in Cebu City. Tau Gamma Phi chapter president Jayber Oyon-Oyon was arrested on suspicion of the murder.

In 2005, Cebu governor Gwendolyn Garcia again summoned the leaders of the two fraternities for peace talks, describing the conflict between the two fraternities as "deadly tantrums." In January 2006, members of the fraternity were involved in a melee with Tau Gamma Phi members that injured several spectators during the Sinulog festival parade. In August of that same year, Alpha Kappa Rho's anniversary motorcade around Cebu City was marred by a shooting incident that killed one member and injured one teenaged member. National and local leaders of the two fraternities again were summoned to a meeting with Cebu Provincial Police Office director Vicente Loot along with police officials from several Cebu towns and cities to plan activities to stem the violence and to sign a handwritten manifesto.

Despite this, documented cases of fraternity-related violence have persisted since:

- In December 2007, Aristotle Aves was arrested while on board a ferry bound for Ormoc, Leyte. One of Cebu's most wanted at the time, Aves has been tagged as an "AKRHO hitman" by the Cebu police with a ₱300,000 bounty offered by the Cebu provincial government. Aves was the main suspect for at least 17 fraternity-related killings in Cebu. AKRHO regional president Richard Buscaino claimed that Aves has been suspended from the fraternity ever since he was tagged for murder. Aves and another AKRHO member were convicted of murder and two counts of frustrated murder in 2015.
- In October 2011, Bobby Morados, a barangay councilor in Cebu City, tagged AKRHO as the culprits in a failed ambush that targeted and wounded him. Morados' son, allegedly a Tau Gamma Phi member, was one of the three fatalities of an October 2007 drive-by shooting perpetrated by Aristotle Aves and is believed to be in retaliation for the 2006 AKRHO anniversary shooting.
- On November 4, 2013, police arrested Arnel Solivar for the murder of a spokesman of the Philippine Drug Enforcement Agency. Police identified Solivar as another AKRHO hitman and an accomplice of Aristotle Aves. AKRHO regional president Buscaino again denied that Solivar is a member of the fraternity.
- On January 13, 2015, an AKRHO member was arrested for the murder of Jayford Romanillos, the son of a local police official and an alleged member of a rival gang.
- On October 10, 2018, three AKRHO members were charged with frustrated murder for shooting a 14-year-old boy who they believed joined the Kalmados Gang, a rival group.
- On June 5, 2022, Tau Gamma Phi fratmen shot and wounded a member of AKRHO after an altercation between the groups in Minglanilla, Cebu.
- On October 26, 2022, a 21-year-old member of AKRHO was stabbed and killed by two rival fraternity members in the Camotes Islands, Cebu.

Several other cases of Alpha Kappa Rho and Tau Gamma Phi members being murdered have been documented, however, the identity of the perpetrators and motive could not be positively identified or have been intentionally withheld. This includes the October 8, 2021 murder of former AKRHO national president and board of trustees member Richard Buscaino, who was ambushed and killed by motorcycle-riding gunmen in Cebu City. AKRHO's national leadership asked to avoid speculating on the affiliations of the gunmen, while Cebu police have also refused to reveal the identities of the persons of interest.

=== Recruitment abuse ===
On August 20, 2008, an alleged Alpha Kappa Rho initiator was charged with kidnapping and serious illegal detention with rape of a female minor in Minglanilla, Cebu.

On May 27, 2011, a 16-year-old female high school student was raped and killed by Alpha Kappa Rho members Rodel Gelito and Joseph Onate in Boracay, Aklan. The victim, along with seven other teenagers, joined fraternity initiation rites allegedly headed by the two AKRHO members who then raped and killed her, then dumped her body inside a cave in Sitio Lapuslapos Hills, Boracay. Gelito and Onate were arrested in November 2012.

In 2018, three expelled members of Alpha Kappa Rho were arrested by Cebu police for recruiting minors, including two girls aged 11 and 12 who were allegedly forced to use shabu and were abused sexually. According to police, the ex-members illegally formed their own group using the name and logo of Alpha Kappa Rho to recruit minors without the fraternity's permission.

== Notable members ==
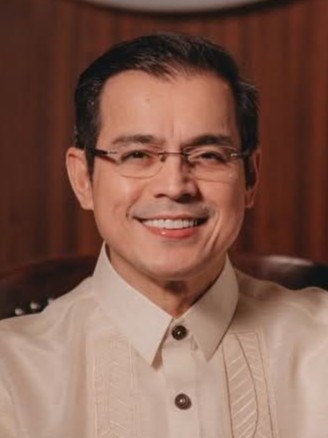
Isko Moreno, mayor of Manila since 2025; previously served in the same position from 2019 to 2022.

- Sebastian "Baste" Duterte, mayor of Davao City
- Baron Geisler, actor
- Rendon Labador, social media personality
- Zoren Legaspi, actor
- Francis Magalona, rapper and television personality
- Sam Milby, actor and musician
- Chito Miranda, lead singer of Parokya ni Edgar
- Cesar Montano, actor and director
- Isko Moreno, mayor of Manila
- Arnel Pineda, lead singer of American rock band Journey

== See also ==
- List of fraternities and sororities in the Philippines
- List of hazing deaths in the Philippines
- Service fraternities and sororities
