= Death of Christine Dacera =

2021 death in the Philippines

- City Garden Grand Hotel in Makati, photo taken in 2017, where Dacera and her friends celebrated their New Year's party before she was found unconscious.
- Date: January 1, 2021; 5 years ago
- Venue: City Garden Grand Hotel
- Location: Makati, Metro Manila, Philippines; 14.564683°N 121.029218°E
- Cause: Aortic aneurysm (Note: According to death certificate and medico-legal report; the Dacera family disputed this cause.)
- Participants: Room 2209: 12 (including Christine Dacera); Room 2207/2009: 13 Total participants: 24 men and 1 woman
- Deaths: Christine Dacera
- Arrests: 3 (later released)
- Verdict: All cases dismissed

The death of Christine Dacera occurred in the early hours of New Year's Day of 2021. Dacera, a 23-year-old flight attendant, was found unconscious in a bathtub in City Garden Grand Hotel, Makati, Metro Manila, Philippines. Dacera was a flight attendant for PAL Express which was based in Manila, Philippines. She was declared "dead on arrival" at around 12:25 p.m. (PHT) after she was rushed to Makati Medical Center.

Initially reported as rape and homicide case, Dacera's death certificate listed the cause of death as an aortic aneurysm, a form of aortic dissection; however, the Dacera family believed that Dacera was raped and disputed the medico-legal report. In an investigation, eleven men who were with Dacera before her death have been described by authorities as "persons of interest".

The rape and homicide charges filed against the men were later dismissed due to lack of evidence, as well as all other cases filed against Dacera's mother, the lawyers of both parties, and the Philippine National Police medico-legal officer, respectively. Dacera's death gained widespread media attention as a result of suspicious circumstances which appeared to contradict the findings of the Philippine National Police.

== Christine Dacera ==
Christine Dacera
- Dacera posing inside a Philippine Airlines aircraft cabin.
- Born: Christine Angelica Faba Dacera; April 13, 1997; General Santos, Philippines
- Died: January 1, 2021 (aged 23); Makati, Philippines
- Resting place: Forest Lake Memorial Parks, General Santos, Philippines
- Other names: Lyca, Ica
- Education: University of the Philippines Mindanao (BA)
- Occupation: Flight attendant

Christine Angelica Faba Dacera (Tagalog: [kɾɪsˈtin daˈsɛɾa]; April 13, 1997 – January 1, 2021) was a Filipina flight attendant for the Philippine Airlines subsidiary PAL Express. The second of the four siblings, she graduated cum laude with a Bachelor of Arts in media arts from the University of the Philippines Mindanao in Davao City. Although Dacera spent her youth in General Santos, Dacera was based in Manila due to career exigencies at PAL Express.

== Investigation ==
On December 31, 2020, at 11:37 pm, Dacera asked her mother for her blessing to celebrate the New Year with her co-workers at the City Garden Grand Hotel in Makati. She was taken to Makati Medical Center on January 1, 2021, and was declared dead on arrival.

According to officials from Makati Police Station, timestamped CCTV footage recovered from the morning of Dacera's death indicates that the woman and several suspects were together, celebrating the New Year, several hours before the incident took place. Two of Dacera's friends who appeared in the footage have since stated that they are gay, and "would not do any harm to her". At roughly noon on January 1, Dacera's body was found in a bathtub in room 2209 of the City Garden Grand Hotel. According to police, several bruises were found on Christine's body, and there were indications that Dacera was abused. In an autopsy, no signs of being choked or beaten on the head were found.

The police initially reported her case as a "rape-slay" but according to the autopsy report conducted by the coroner, Police Major Michael Nick Sarmiento, Dacera died from ruptured aortic aneurysm. Police stated that the cause of death could have been natural; however, lacerations on her thighs, contusions on her knees, and scratches were found on Dacera's body. Lacerations and sperm were also found in her genitalia, indicating that there was sexual contact prior to Dacera's death. On January 5, 2021, following the identification of several suspects the Philippine National Police (PNP) declared Dacera's case "solved", despite widespread claims of a lack of evidence and a "botched" investigation. On the same day, Philippine National Police chief Gen. Debold Sinas threatened to hunt down the suspects of Dacera's death if they did not surrender themselves within three days. A second autopsy has since been conducted on Dacera's body, but the results remain confidential.

On January 7, 2021, the PNP admitted that they had presently not collected sufficient evidence to adequately investigate the circumstances and possible perpetrators of Dacera's death. On January 10, the National Bureau of Investigation (NBI) obtained bodily fluid from Dacera's remains from the second autopsy, conducted on January 9. The samples are yet to be subjected to a DNA test. On the same day, the PNP said that they identified the eight participants in the room 2207, where the death and the events of the evening transpired.

On January 27, 2021, the Philippine National Police released a medico-legal report indicating that Dacera died of natural causes, particularly aortic aneurysm, ruling out homicide; however, Dacera's family disputed the results. In response, on January 29, Salvador Panelo chastised the Dacera camp, saying, "You don't go on a crusade for justice for a crime that hadn't even taken place, punishing innocent people along the way. That's wrong. My goodness!"

On April 23, 2021, the Makati Prosecutor's Office dismissed the rape and homicide cases filed against the 11 respondents due to lack of evidence. On February 7, 2022, all related cases against the respondents, Dacera's mother Sharon, the lawyers of both parties, and Philippine National Police medico-legal officer PMaj. Michael Nick Sarmiento, respectively, were dismissed.

=== Investigation of City Garden Grand Hotel ===
The City Garden Grand Hotel was investigated for possible violations of the regulations related to the ongoing COVID-19 pandemic, specifically regarding a provision that only two people are permitted to check into a room. The Department of Tourism subsequently revoked the hotel's permit to operate, suspended the hotel's accreditation for six months, and fined the hotel ₱10,000 on January 14.

== See also ==
- Vizconde murders
- Chiong murder case
