= Zamboanga National High School West =

Public high school in Zamboanga City, Philippines

Location
- R.T.Lim Blvd., Zamboanga City; Philippines
- Coordinates: 6°54′39″N 122°03′42″E

Information
- Type: Public
- Established: June 30, 1986
- Principal: Judy S. Hicap
- Campus: Urban
- Colors: Red and White
- Nickname: "Westerners"

The Zamboanga National High School West or simply called "West" is a school on R.T Lim Boulevard, Zamboanga City. It was established on June 30, 1986.

== Departments ==
ZNHS West is composed of eight subject departments (excluding Chinese Mandarin under the English Department, Environmental Science under the Science Department, and STVEP under the T.L.E. Department).

- Mr. Zandro G. Sepe,MS – Principal IV
- Mrs. Helen Mangumpit – English Department
- Dr. Ma. Fe S. Gadaingan – Mathematics Department
- Mrs. Lourdes Alvarez-Mendoza – T.L.E. Department
- Mrs. Aida A. Flores – Filipino Department
- Dr. Eden A. Gregorio – Araling Panlipunan Department
- Mr. Boysie A. Santiago – MAPEH Department
- Mrs. Ester P. Rey – Values Education Department
- Mr. Abdu-Aziz J. Bensali – Science and Technology Department

== Special programs ==
Science and Technology and Engineering Mathematics (STEM) is the special program given by the Department of Education to the school which is under the Science Department.

Special Program for Foreign Language (SPFL) is also a special program taught by the school. This foreign language is Chinese Mandarin. It is under the English Department.

STVEP is the new program under the T.L.E. department. It teaches about Technical Drawing and Computer.

Special Needs Education Program (SNED) is also among the programs that cater the needs of learners who are diagnosed to have special educational needs. The program in-charge is Values Education Department.
