= Tau Gamma Sigma =

Filipino college sorority

- ΤΓΣ
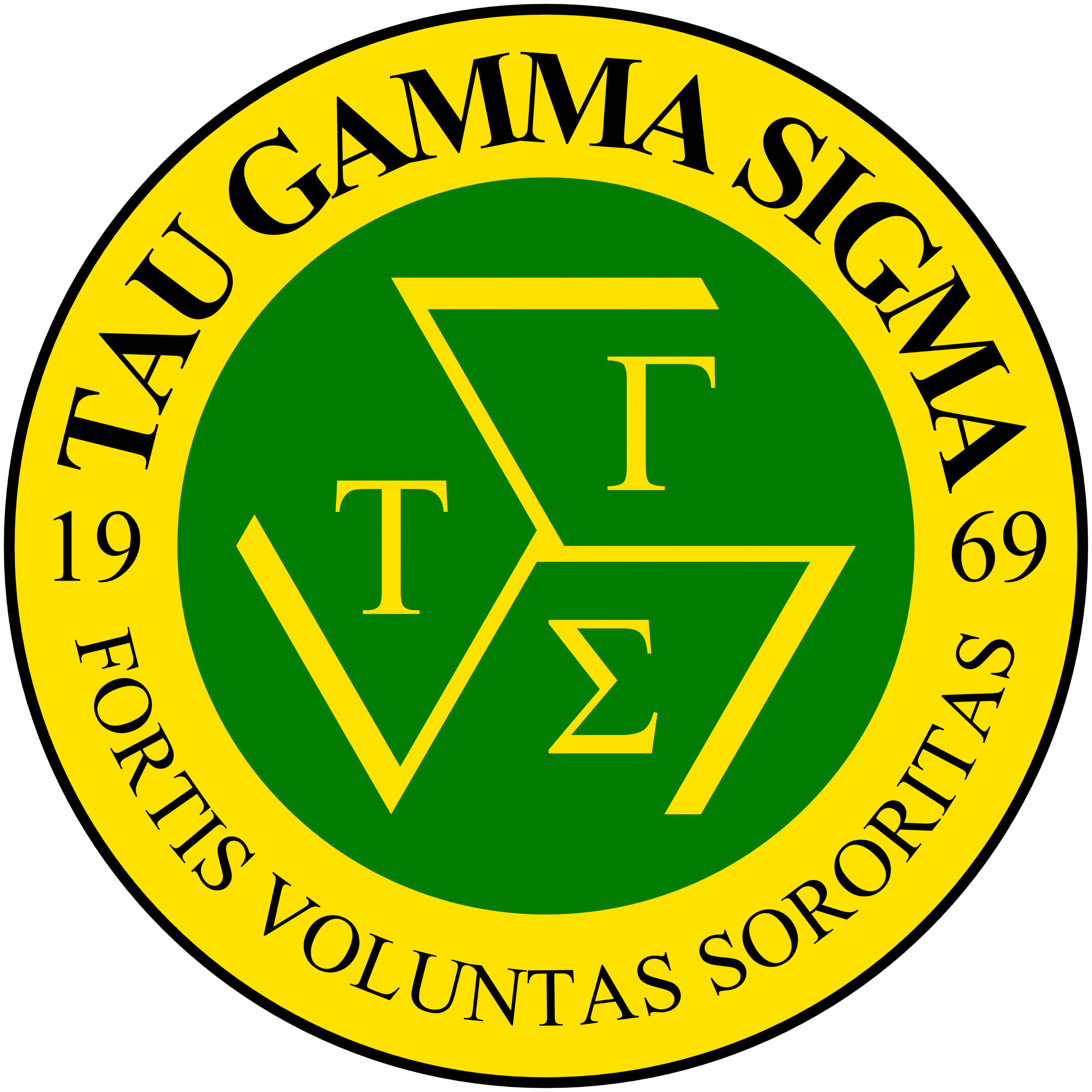
- Founded: January 17, 1969; 57 years ago University of the Philippines
- Type: Traditional
- Affiliation: Independent
- Status: Active
- Scope: Local
- Motto: "A Triskelion firmly believes in the power of reason and not in the use of force as reason."
- Pillars: Fortis Voluntas Sororitas; Strength, Freewill, Sisterhood
- Colors: Gold Green Black
- Symbol: Lady Triskelion
- Mascot: Lioness
- Patron saint: St. Anthony the Great
- Chapters: 1
- Headquarters: University of the Philippines Diliman; Quezon City, Metro Manila; Philippines

Tau Gamma Sigma (ΤΓΣ) also known as the Triskelions' Grand Sorority, is a sorority established in the Philippines. Its members call themselves Lady Triskelions. Its fraternity counterpart is Tau Gamma Phi (ΤΓΦ) also known as the Triskelions' Grand Fraternity.

== History ==
On January 17, 1969, Tau Gamma Sigma was founded by ten women from the University of the Philippines Diliman. The founders were friends of the Tau Gamma Phi fraternity founders. The women were all political science students and members of the same political science club as the founders of Tau Gamma Phi.

The first initiation rites were held in Bustos, Bulacan. Successive batches followed until they reached fifty members from different colleges in UP Diliman. The formal sorority structure was ratified in July 1970.

After the declaration of martial law in 1972, the shared office of Tau Gamma Phi and Tau Gamma Sigma inside UP Diliman was raided under an arrest-search and seizure order signed by then-secretary of defense Juan Ponce Enrile, which resulted in the confiscation of several subversive materials and documents. Both the sorority and the fraternity were critical of the Marcos administration.

== Symbols ==
Tau Gamma Sigma's motto is "A Triskelion firmly believes in the power of reason and not in the use of force as reason.". The sorority's colors are gold, green, and black. Its patron saint is St. Anthony the Great. Its pillars are Fortis Voluntas Sororitas or Strength, Freewill, Sisterhood. Its symbol is Lady Triskelion and its mascot is the lioness. Its anthem is the ''Triskelion Hymn''.

== Notable members ==
- Lougee Basabas – lead vocalist of alternative rock band Mojofly and former host of variety show Eat Bulaga!
- Rosmari D. Carandang – associate justice of the Supreme Court
- Marides C. Fernando – former mayor of Marikina
- Glydel Mercado – film and TV actress
- Jopay Paguia – former member of dance group SexBomb Girls
- Charee Pineda – actress and city councilor of Valenzuela
- Angeline Quinto – singer and actress
- Suzette Ranillo – actress, producer and director
- Luzviminda G. Tancangco – former chairperson of the Commission on Elections

== See also ==
- Tau Gamma Phi
- List of fraternities and sororities in the Philippines
