= Death of John Matthew Salilig =

2023 hazing death in the Philippines

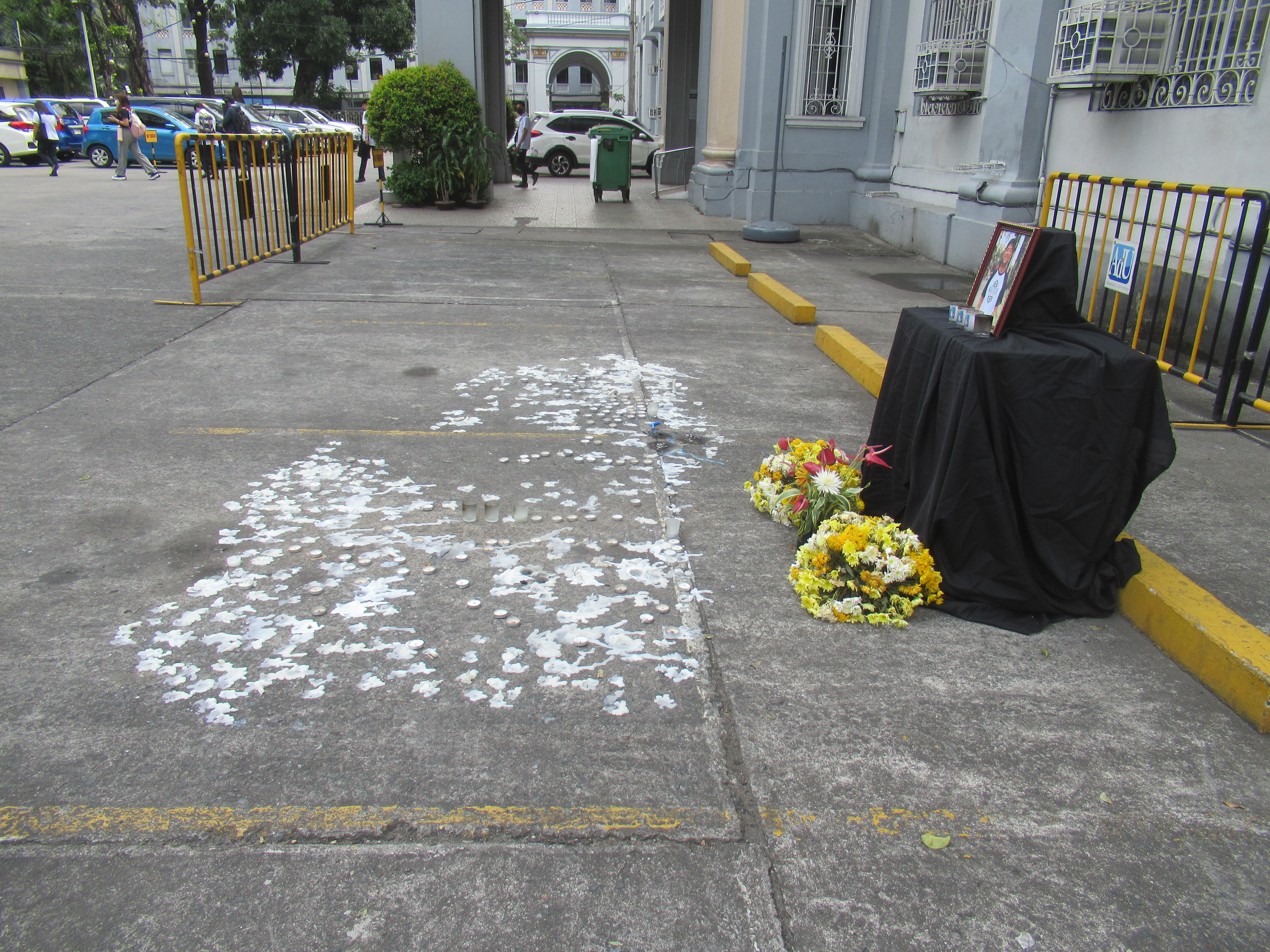
- Candlelight vigil for Salilig at Adamson University on March 3, 2023
- Date: February 18, 2023 (initiation rites and subsequent death); February 28, 2023 (body discovered)
- Location: Biñan, Laguna (initiation rites) Imus, Cavite (body discovered)
- Type: Hazing death
- Cause: Blunt force trauma to the lower extremities
- Organised by: Tau Gamma Phi
- Participants: 18 (1 deceased)
- Deaths: John Matthew Salilig
- Accused: Earl Anthony Romero; Tung Cheng Teng; Jerome Balot; Sandro Victorino; Michael Lambert Ritalde; Mark Pedrosa; Daniel de los Reyes Perry

John Matthew Torres Salilig (December 1, 1998 – February 18, 2023), a 24-year-old 3rd-year chemical engineering student from Adamson University, died on February 18, 2023, after undergoing fraternity initiation rites conducted by Tau Gamma Phi in Biñan, Laguna. His body was later found by the police in a shallow grave in Imus, Cavite, on February 28, 2023. A police investigation determined that Salilig died from blunt force trauma as a result of the 70 blows he sustained during the initiation. At least 18 individuals were implicated by the police in the death of the student; seven of whom were arrested, including an alleged master initiator.

== Background ==
John Matthew Salilig
- Born: John Matthew Torres Salilig; December 1, 1998
- Died: February 18, 2023 (aged 24)
- Cause of death: Blunt force trauma
- Body discovered: February 28, 2023; Imus, Cavite
- Resting place: Forest Lake Memorial Parks, Zamboanga City
- Other name: Matt
- Education: Adamson University
- Occupation: Student

John Matthew Torres Salilig was a 24-year-old 3rd-year chemical engineering student from Adamson University. He was based in Zamboanga City and had seven siblings. He was a member of the Zamboanga chapter of Tau Gamma Phi. Two of his brothers, John Michael and John Martin, are also members of Tau Gamma Phi. John Michael also underwent initiation rites but survived the hazing.

The Philippine National Police (PNP) reported at least 178 hazing incidents since 2012, with the highest number being recorded in 2019. The Republic Act No. 8049 or the Anti-Hazing Law was first enacted in 1995 following the 1991 death of Lenny Villa, a student from Ateneo de Manila University. The law was amended and supplemented in 2018 following the death of Horatio Castillo, a student from the University of Santo Tomas, in 2017. Despite this, the practice of hazing still continues.

== Circumstances and death ==
On February 18, 2023, John Matthew Salilig attended the initiation rites conducted by Tau Gamma Phi in an apartment in Biñan, Laguna, according to his brother. He was then reported missing after.

During the investigation, police obtained CCTV footage timestamped 10:30 am (PhST), showing Salilig and the Tau Gamma fraternity members riding the bus to Biñan for the initiation rites on February 18, 2023 - the date when Salilig was last seen alive. Another CCTV recording showed the SUV that was allegedly used to transport Salilig driving through the streets of Biñan, followed by the two riders on a motorcycle; one of them carrying a paddle which was allegedly used on the victim. The paddle was nowhere to be found; however, the vehicle used to transport Salilig was in police custody.

During the initiation rites, which took place between 1 pm to 3 pm (PhST), Salilig and two other neophytes suffered 70 blows to their bodies. Salilig experienced stomach pain and soiled himself before turning pale and vomiting. Fraternity officers reportedly poured candle wax on the neophytes and whipped them with a belt.

The fraternity members then drove to a house in Parañaque. Upon arrival, Salilig was too weak to exit the vehicle. He suffered a seizure and lost consciousness, whereupon he was brought into the house. Other reports stated that Salilig was transported to an SUV, where he died while on the road from Biñan to Manila. Instead of bringing him to the hospital, the members decided to bury his body in a shallow grave in Imus.

At this point, news of Salilig's disappearance became known to Adamson and Salilig's brother John Martin, who traveled from Zamboanga to Manila in search of his brother. On February 28, Salilig's now-decomposed body was discovered by the police, with John Martin present at the scene.

The autopsy report stated that Salilig died from severe blunt force trauma to the lower extremities. Salilig's remains were flown back to his home in Zamboanga City and interred at Forest Lake Memorial Park on March 4, 2023, after a funeral.

== Suspects ==
The police tagged 18 persons of interest behind the hazing, with seven of them taken into police custody. 14 of them delivered blows to Salilig. On March 1, the police arrested six persons behind Salilig's death, namely Earl Anthony Romero, 21; Tung Cheng Cheng, 22; Jerome Balot, 22; Sandro Victorino, 28; Michael Lambert Ritalde, 31; and Mark Pedrosa, 39. A father of one of the suspects was also arrested for obstruction of justice but he was released few days after. On March 2, a seventh suspect named Daniel de los Reyes Perry was also arrested. Perry was said to be the master initiator. With the arrest of seven persons, who are facing charges for violation of Republic Act No. 11053 or the Anti-Hazing Act, the police declared the case as "solved". However, 10 others still remain at large. One person of interest, a member of Tau Gamma but not a student, reportedly died from suicide on February 28 – the same day Salilig's body was found.

Another Adamson student and neophyte fraternity member who underwent hazing alongside Salilig turned himself in to the Biñan police on March 1, where he positively identified six persons of interest. The neophyte said that Salilig was with him during the initiation rites.

On March 3, the Philippine National Police (PNP) warned the public not to interfere with the investigation into Salilig's death.

On March 9, the National Bureau of Investigation (NBI) publicly released the group chat messages of Tau Gamma, which detailed the circumstances prior to Salilig's death. On February 17, about 10 in the morning, the members and officers of the fraternity received a reminder about their meeting for the initiation of recruits. All members in the group chat were obligated to attend the meeting and day of welcoming rites. One member even threatened to expel those who did not attend. On February 18, the group arrived in Biñan at around 8:30 am. Later in the evening, the member started to express their anger when Salilig was not feeling well (although did not name Salilig in the chat). Before 9 pm, Salilig was brought to one of their houses, where they tried to revive Salilig who had lost consciousness. After Salilig died, the members left the group chat the next morning.

On March 15, the Department of Justice (DOJ) indicted seven suspects involved in the death of Salilig.

On April 12, all of the accused of the death of Salilig pleaded not guilty to hazing charges.

== Reactions ==
Students from Adamson University wore black on March 1, 2023, as a gesture of sympathy for Saliling's death. The university stated that it held no liability for Saliling's death, as it did not condone fraternities or hazing and the incident took place off school premises. Tau Gamma Phi – Imus and the Commission on Human Rights condemned the student's death. House Speaker Martin Romualdez offered a ₱500,000 reward to anyone who could provide information that would lead to the arrest of the persons behind the hazing. Romualdez also condemned the hazing.

The National Union of Students of the Philippines, Alliance of Concerned Teachers (ACT-Teachers), and Senator Koko Pimentel urged the Philippine government to scrap the mandatory Reserve Officers' Training Corps (ROTC) plan. ACT Teachers described the proposed mandatory ROTC as "militaristic" and "violent", citing the death of Mark Chua in 2001. Senators Ronald dela Rosa and Win Gatchalian – principal authors of the mandatory ROTC bill – objected to the proposal. They added that there was no connection between the training program and the fraternity hazing that caused Salilig's death.

President Bongbong Marcos expressed his sympathy for Salilig's death, stating that "justice will be served".

== See also ==
- Death of Darwin Dormitorio
