= Hazing in fraternities and sororities =

Risky initiation rites in fraternities

Hazing in fraternities and sororities is defined as any act or set of acts that constitutes hazing and occurs in connection to a fraternity or sorority.

Hazing is often cited as one of the most harmful aspects of fraternities and sororities and poses a major threat to their existence, drawing great criticism from educators and administrators. As fraternities and sororities are very diverse in their structures, regulations, governing entities, and memberships, and as hazing can take on many forms, the issue of hazing within these organizations is complex and multifaceted.

== Definitions ==
While most educational institutions include hazing in their disciplinary procedures, definitions of hazing can vary substantially.

The Fraternal Information & Programming Group (FIPG) defines hazing activities as:

Any action taken or situation created, intentionally, whether on or off fraternity premises, to produce mental or physical discomfort, embarrassment, harassment, or ridicule. Such activities may include but are not limited to the following: use of alcohol, paddling in any form, creation of excessive fatigue, physical and psychological shocks, quests, treasure hunts, scavenger hunts, road trips, or any other such activities carried on outside or inside of the confines of the chapter house; wearing of public apparel which is conspicuous and not normally in good taste, engaging in public stunts and buffoonery, morally degrading or humiliating games and activities, and other activities which are not consistent with academic achievement, fraternal law, ritual or policy or the regulations and policies of the educational institution or applicable state law.

Hazing is a crime in 44 states. For example, the Arizona Revised Statutes provides the following definition:

"Hazing" means any intentional, knowing, or reckless act committed by a student, whether individually or in concert with other persons, against another student, and in which both of the following apply: (a) The act was committed in connection with an initiation into, an affiliation with, or the maintenance of membership in any organization that is affiliated with an educational institution. (b) The act contributes to a substantial risk of potential physical injury, mental harm or degradation or causes physical injury, mental harm, or personal degradation.

Generally, institutions of higher education will have their own definitions of hazing, though they may closely mirror definitions found in their respective state statutes. For example, the University of Arizona provides the following definition of hazing in its "University of Arizona Hazing Policy", revised October 25, 2001:

"Hazing" means any intentional, knowing, or reckless act committed by a student, whether individually or in concert with other persons, against another student, and in which both of the following apply: (a) The act was committed in connection with an initiation into, an affiliation with or the maintenance of membership in any organization that is affiliated with the University. (b) The act contributes to a substantial risk of potential physical injury, mental harm or degradation, or causes physical injury, mental harm, or personal degradation.

Note that the University of Arizona’s definition of hazing is virtually identical to the definition outlined in the Arizona Revised Statutes.

The current North American Interfraternity Conference (NIC) definition of hazing also includes anything that could turn into hazing. This is the reason that many potentially innocent activities, such as a scavenger hunt, are included under hazing; they could start as perfectly legal events, but could easily be modified to include some activity that could make it hazing (ex. stealing some of the items on the list or adding heavy drinking before or during). Requiring candidates, or even members as there is "brother on brother hazing", to attend events or be at a certain place at a certain time is also hazing. Many also consider the use of the term 'pledge' to be hazing. Things like physical activity will be condoned if there are fraters that are in the US Army or other armed forces present, whereas if those members weren't there it would be considered hazing.

== Problems in the quantitative analysis ==
Due to the nature of hazing, the secretive nature of Greek letter organizations, and the fear of negative repercussions, hazing is largely underreported. Most, if not all, hazing activities take place either during pledge (or "interest") activities or rituals, which are almost always secretive. Additionally, since many Greek letter organizations, such as those governed by the National Pan-Hellenic Council (NPHC) and the National Association of Latino Fraternal Organizations (NALFO), prohibit their pledges (also known as "interests" or "new members") from revealing their association with their organization until they have been initiated, it becomes increasingly difficult for institutions to reach out to members in anti-hazing efforts. It also becomes virtually impossible for these pledges or interests to reach out for help, especially if they wish to remain members, pledges, or interests of their organizations. However, Cheryl Drout and Christie Corsoro of State University of New York at Fredonia state, "Hazing, which is officially banned by all national Greek organizations, frequently comes to the public's attention through the popular news media when the activities become fatal". Unfortunately for multitudes of members of Greek organizations, "Sororities and fraternities have come to be synonymous with elitism, sexual assault, high-risk hazing (initiation ceremonies) and other bad behavior on American university campuses".

Fraternities and sororities are commonly associated with paddling of members, especially new members or pledges, as part of their hazing rituals.

== Responses to hazing ==
Many educational institutions have developed anti-hazing programs, which encourage alternatives to hazing through the planning of purposeful activities, inform students of how to take action and avoid being a bystander, and provide clear consequences for those students and/or organizations who violate hazing policies. Additionally, hazing has become a central focus of programs designed to help Greek letter organizations become more value congruent through institutionalized standards and expectations.

Attempts at preventing hazing have also targeted Greek letter organizations at the national level. Cobb & McRee (2007) note the important role of culture change within the North American fraternity and sorority movement and even encourage the closure of chapters that consistently partake in illegal and risky activities and pose threats to their local and university communities. DeSousa, Gordon & Kimbrough (2004) propose the creation of a recognized pledge program in which national fraternity and sorority leaders participate, under the recognized supervision of university officials, as well as the yearly evaluation of fraternities and sororities to determine their eligibility for continued recognition and sponsorship. Again, such a proposal is difficult since many NPHC and NALFO organizations, not to mention other organizations not governed by these umbrella organizations, keep their pledge, interest, or new member programs completely secretive.

Greek letter organizations have themselves taken measures to prevent hazing within their member chapters. As such, individual national organizations have taken various measures to ensure the safety of members about hazing. The National Panhellenic Conference, which governs 26 national and international women's sororities, includes sanctions against both individuals and groups ranging from member/chapter probation to expulsion of offending members or revocation of the chapter's charter. The organization also runs an anti-hazing hotline for anonymous incident reporting.

Similarly, the North American Interfraternity Conference released a resolution condemning the practice. In 2010, NIC CEO and President Peter Smithhisler derided the use of hazing as a means of building comradery:

"The intention of the hazer is to create unity, to create trust, to establish a person's commitment to the organization," he said. "But in reality, what he is doing is creating a bond among the hazees while eliminating the trust between hazer and hazee, ultimately breaking down the bond of brotherhood."

Additionally, there are individual national Greek Letter Organizations taking the initiative against activities related to hazing. In 2007, 21 fraternities and sororities came together to form the National Anti-Hazing Hotline. In 2012 Phi Beta Sigma fraternity adopted an anti-hazing campaign to eradicate hazing practices in its individual chapters, providing numerous support resources to effectively combat the practice.

== Fraternity hazing characteristics ==
In an article by Hank Nuwer, a professor of journalism and an author of books on hazing, he compared the hazing rituals of fraternities to cults. Nuwer talks about the aspects of hazing that make the pledge keep coming back to the fraternity and the ramifications of dropping out. Nuwer consulted with a professor in psychology, Margaret Thaler Singer, to get a better understanding of the characteristics of cults to relate those behaviors with fraternity hazing. Nuwer believes that hazing, along with a cult, is a "'systematic' manipulation and coercion to effect 'psychological and social influence'".

The first aspect Nuwer wrote about was "enforced dependency". He talked about how the hazing process where fraternities make their pledges stay at the house the whole time, keeping them sleep deprived and cutting them off from daily activities makes them dependent on their fraternity. Even though the "pledges" may fall behind in school or lose friends outside of their fraternity, the fraternity convinces the pledge that after the hazing ceases, it will all be worth it. This reassurance keeps the pledges coming back, reliant on the people who are hazing them; relating to the next aspect of "family". Fraternities continually tell their pledges they are joining a family. This aspect appeals to most college freshmen who are having a hard time making friends in a different environment. Last, Nuwer discussed how fraternities "make it hard for their members to leave". He says that those who decide not to join after being hazed have already given up so much for the fraternity that they feel alone and may even experience post-traumatic stress. Nuwer gives solutions to hazing in fraternities including stronger consequences for those involved in the hazing and that colleges should become more intertwined with the Greek letter community to learn about hazing and to stop it.

In "On Fraternities & Manliness", an article on the motivations for hazing, Emily Smith states that such actions come from a desire to prove a state of "manliness". Hazing practices in fraternity life began to appear shortly after the Civil War. Veterans brought the hazing practices of their battalions back with them, adopting such activities into fraternity life. The purpose of hazing was perceived as a way of providing young males an outlet to prove their manliness through rites and trials, showing themselves to be men and not boys. Other hazing practices served to put an individual in his place, reducing his sense of personal omnipotence to "subsume his individuality into something larger and better than himself".

== In popular culture ==
The 1977 film Fraternity Row, set in the 1950s, deals with the subject of hazing at a college fraternity, depicting a number of such practices and culminating with Gregory Harrison as a victim of a hazing ritual that inadvertently takes a fatal turn.

The 2016 film Goat is based on the book Goat: A Memoir by Brad Land, described as a "searing memoir of fraternity culture and the perils of hazing provides an unprecedented window into the emotional landscape of young men."

The 2017 film Burning Sands is a story about five students pledging a historically black fraternity at a historically black college.

== See also ==
- List of hazing deaths in the United States
- List of hazing deaths in the Philippines
- National Anti-Hazing Hotline
- History of North American college fraternities and sororities
- Matt's Law
- The Gordie Foundation
- Racism in United States college fraternities and sororities
- Penn State fraternity hazing scandal
