= Anti-Hazing Act of 1995 =

Philippine law

- Long title: An Act Regulating Hazing and Other Forms of Initiation Rites in Fraternities, Sororities, and Other Organizations and Providing Penalties Therefor
- Citation: Republic Act No. 8049

Keywords
- hazing, fraternity, sorority

The Anti-Hazing Act of 1995, officially designated as Republic Act No. 8049, is a Philippine law that regulates the acts of hazing and other initiation rites in fraternities and sororities in the country. It prohibits and penalizes physical harm and violence in such practices.

== Background ==
The Anti-Hazing Act was passed as a response to the death of Leonardo Villa in 1991. Villa died from multiple injuries when he underwent hazing rites by the Aquila Legis, a fraternity of law students at the Ateneo de Manila University. Two decades later in 2012, the Supreme Court of the Philippines found five members of the fraternity guilty of reckless imprudence resulting in homicide. The Anti-Hazing Act couldn't be applied to the five since it was still yet to be enacted as law when Villa died.

== Convictions ==
By 2017, only one conviction has been made under the Anti-Hazing Act which was in 2015 when two Alpha Phi Omega members were found guilty for the death of Marlon Villanueva, a University of the Philippines Los Baños student, in 2006

== Proposed amendments ==
Bills to amend the Anti-Hazing Act has been passed in both the Upper and Lower House. In 2016, Majority leader Tito Sotto passed Senate Bill 223 which aims to impose the maximum penalty for violators under the influence of alcohol and illegal drugs as well as if a non-resident or alumni fraternity member present during the hazing rites.

Both Win Gatchalian's Senate Bill 199 and Bagong Henerasyon party-list representative Bernadette Herrera-Dy's House Bill 3467 seeks to ban all forms of hazing, only allowing initiation rites which do not inflict physical or psychological harm. Gatchalian's bill also proposes to impose stiffer penalties and fine to non-resident and intoxicated members involved in hazing, additional fine if hazing results to death, mutilation, rape, and sodomy, and requiring schools to conduct awareness campaign on hazing.

== Amendments ==
RA8049 was updated in 2018 with the passage of RA11053, the "Anti-Hazing Act of 2018".

== See also ==
- List of hazing deaths in the Philippines
