= Alternative Learning System (Philippines) =

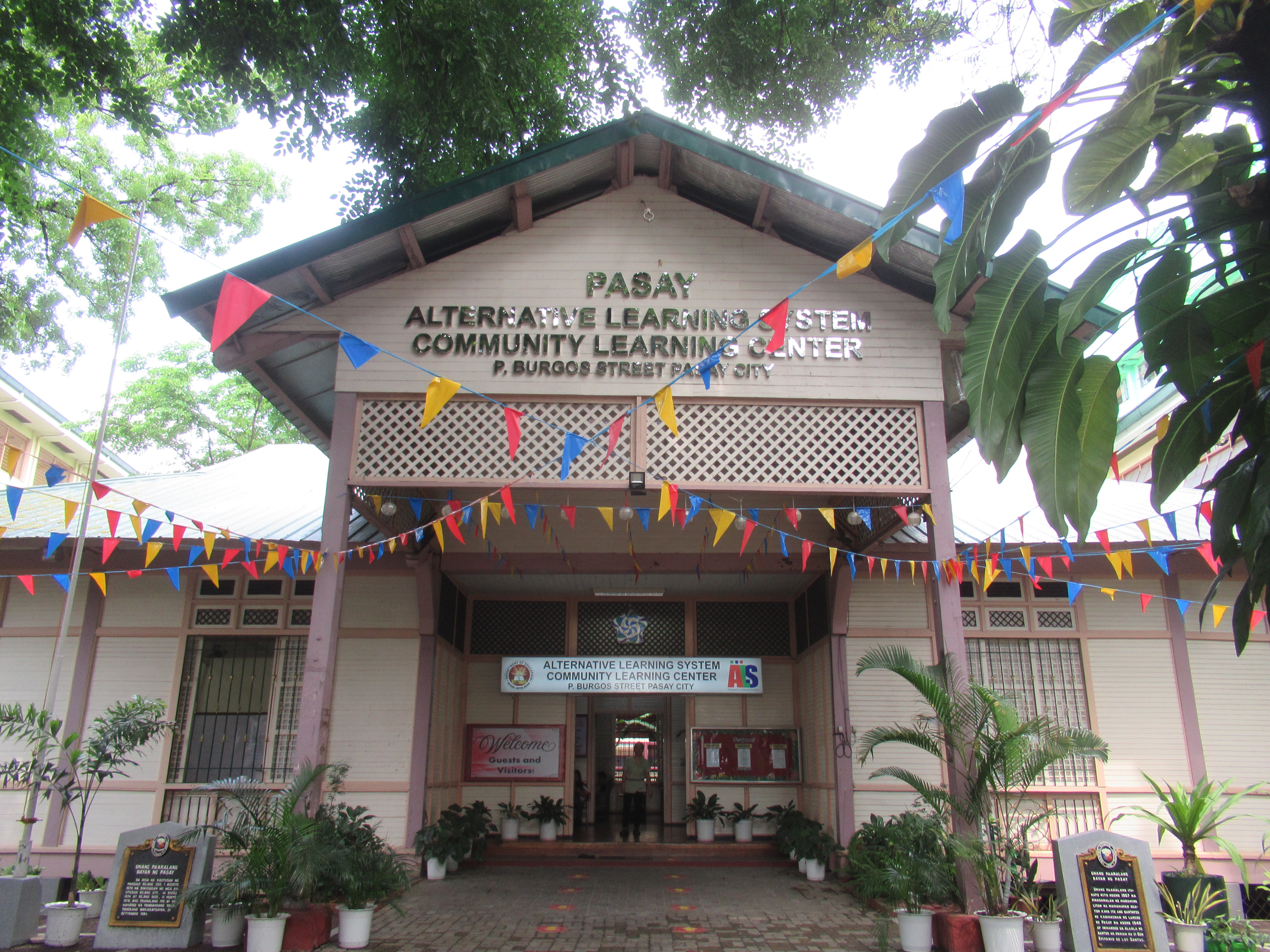
Pasay Alternative Learning System Community Learning Center

The Alternative Learning System (ALS) is a parallel learning system in the Philippines under the Department of Education that provides a practical option to the existing formal instruction. When one does not have or cannot access formal education in schools, ALS is an alternate or substitute. The system only requires learners to attend learning sessions based on the agreed schedule between the learners and the learning facilitators.

The program has two different schematics for conducting instruction: school-based and community-based. On the school-based program, instructions are conducted in school campuses while in the community-based program, formal instruction are conducted in community halls or on private places. The ALS program follows a uniform lesson modules for all academic subjects covering the sciences, mathematics, English, Filipino, social studies, current events among others. Delivery of instructions are provided by government-paid instructors or by private non-government organization.

Aside from schematics, the program has two levels: elementary and secondary. Students have to start from elementary level, then proceed to high school level. If a student is a graduate of elementary under a formal classroom system, the student is automatically admitted to the secondary levels depending on which year level the student stopped schooling.

== History ==
Republic Act No. 11510 signed by President Rodrigo Duterte on December 23, 2020

The ALS program was launched by the Department of Education in 2004. It was institutionalized on December 23, 2020, through Republic Act No. 11510, known as the "Alternative Learning System Act", signed by President Rodrigo Duterte.

In January 2026, the Department of Education issued DepEd Order No. 1 s. 2026 which provided guidelines on the delivery of the Alternative Learning System.

== Administration ==
Program administration is held by the Department of Education, an agency of the government of the Philippines in charge of providing education to all Filipinos. Private non-government organization may deliver the program but still under the supervision of the Philippine education agency.

== Levels ==
=== Elementary ===
If a learner has not finished his or her elementary schooling, he or she may be admitted to the program. Learners will have to go through a Functional Literacy Test (FLT) in order for the learning facilitator to identify the level of literacy. Learning modules will be suggested for them to focus on relative to the result of their FLT and interest. The learner will then be guided to accomplish an Individual Learning Agreement (ILA). This ILA will be the basis for the learner and facilitator to track the progress and competencies developed by the learner.

=== High school ===
When the learners passed their final exams, the passers may enroll in college, prior to 2013, but since 2014, the A&E test passers may be required to enroll in senior high school.

== Coverage ==
The program covers mostly dropouts in elementary and secondary schools, out-of-school youths, non-readers, working people and even senior citizens wanting to read and write. Students enrolled under the classroom system are barred from participating in the program. Age level, economic and personal circumstances are among the determinants in availing the program.

== Statistics ==
The table contains the data on ALS national enrollment and completion.

School year	Enrollees	Completers	Test takers	Passers
2016-2017	688,024	450,550	177,263	104,586
2017-2018	665,567	475,352	145,494	105,523
2018-2019	836,542	534,255	268,218	179,948
2019-2020	816,417	553,345	491,388	253,183
2020-2021	671,373	402,055	388,002	173,846
2021-2022	550,427			

== In comparison with formal education ==
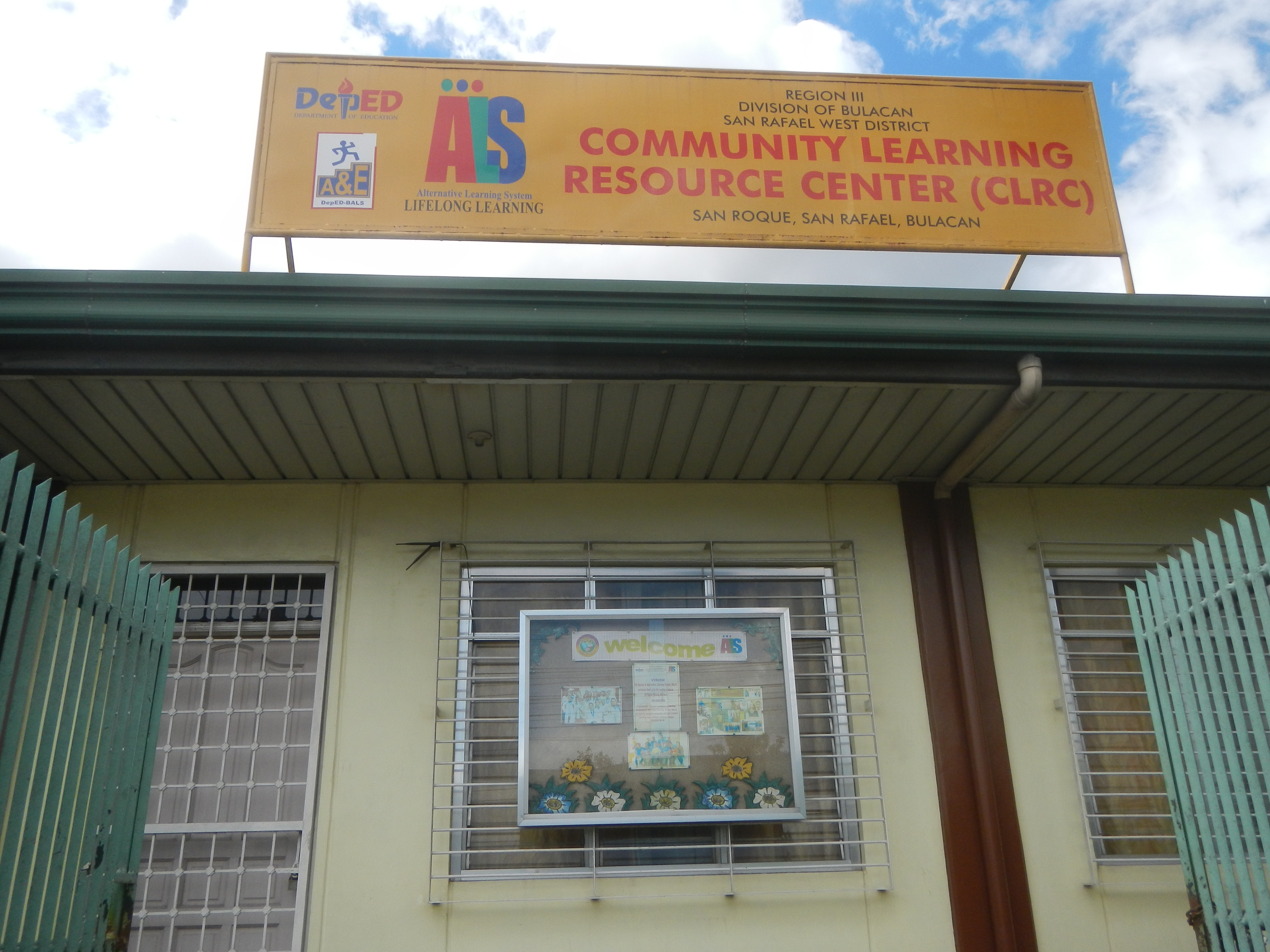
Community Learning Resource Center (Bureau of Alternative Learning System - San Roque, San Rafael, Bulacan)

The ALS evolved from the non-formal education that has been conducted by the government of the Philippines. Previously, non-formal education was mostly concentrated in instructions in livelihood skills training with basic reading and writing incorporated in the module. Under the current system, skills training and livelihood training have been excluded and established as a separate education system. Skills training had become a stand-alone program with Technical Education and Skills Development Authority taking charge of the program.

The ALS is a way for the informal and busy students to achieve elementary and high school education without need of going to attend classroom instructions on a daily basis just like the formal education system. Secondary education has now become a prerequisite in vocational technology and college education in the Philippines. Livelihood trainings, however, do not need formal education in the Philippines.

ALS non-formal education takes place outside of the classroom, is community-based, and is typically delivered at community learning centers, barangay multi-purpose halls, libraries, or students' homes under the supervision of ALS learning facilitators like mobile teachers, district ALS coordinators, and instructional managers according to a schedule and location that both the students and facilitators have agreed upon.

== Notable alumni ==
- Angel Locsin
- Barbie Forteza
- Eunice Lagusad
- Gerald Anderson
- Heart Evangelista
- Jessy Mendiola
- Kim Chiu
- Manny Pacquiao
- Nadine Samonte
- Rhian Ramos
- Vaness del Moral

== See also ==
- K–12 (education)
- DepEd TV
- Distance e-Learning in the Philippines
