= Alpha Phi Omega Philippines =

Service fraternity and sorority

- ΑΦΩ
- Founded: March 2, 1950; 76 years ago Far Eastern University, Manila
- Type: Traditional
- Affiliation: Independent
- Status: Active
- Emphasis: Service
- Scope: National (PH)
- Motto: "Be a Leader, Be a Friend, Be of Service"
- Slogan: "Do a Good Turn Daily"
- Colors: Royal blue and Old glory gold
- Symbol: Golden eagle
- Flower: Forget-me-not
- Tree: Sturdy Oak
- Jewel: Diamond
- Publication: The Torch & Trefoil
- Chapters: 392
- Members: 200,000 lifetime
- Headquarters: 301-A Two Seventy Midtower Condominium; 270 Ermin Garcia Avenue, Brgy Silangan, Cubao; Quezon City, National Capital Region; Philippines
- Website: apo.org.ph

The Alpha Phi Omega Philippines Incorporated, commonly known as Alpha Phi Omega Collegiate Service Fraternity and Sorority or simply Alpha Phi Omega or APO (ΑΦΩ), is a service fraternity and sorority in the Philippines founded in 1950. It is the first established national chapter of Alpha Phi Omega outside of the United States, although both organizations have separate leadership and operate independently. Alpha Phi Omega has 250 chapters in the Philippines and 150,000 members as of 2010.

Alpha Phi Omega commits to the "development of a world-class membership that cares for the quality of life with complete complement guided by the three cardinal principles of Leadership, Friendship, and Service." Founded under the ideals of the scouting movement, the fraternity uses scouting ideals such as the Scout Law as the basis for its code of conduct.

== History ==
The Alpha Phi Omega in the United States was established by Frank Reed Horton on December 16, 1925, at Lafayette College. In 1950, professional scouter Sol George Levy, an APO member from the University of Washington in Seattle, went to the Philippines to generate interest in the scouting movement in the country. Levy invited scouts in Manila to a conference, where he proposed establishing a scouting-based service fraternity in the country and distributed APO publications to the audience.

A group of scouts led by Librado I. Ureta from the Far Eastern University were particularly interested, and on March 2, 1950, he and twenty others established the first organization of APO outside of the United States, now known as the Alpha chapter. The organization was later registered with the Securities and Exchange Commission under the name Alpha Phi Omega (Philippines) Incorporated, then later renewed in 1981 as Alpha Phi Omega International Philippines Incorporated.

=== Sorority and inclusion of women ===
In 1965, the Alpha Phi Sigma Sorority was established to serve as an umbrella organization for the sister sororities of the various fraternity chapters of Alpha Phi Omega. Before its establishment, it was not uncommon for individual fraternity chapters to associate with sororities bearing different names. In 1971, the sorority was formally renamed and recognized as the Alpha Phi Omega Auxiliary Sorority, as the sister association of the Alpha Phi Omega Service Fraternity.

However, as the term "auxiliary" suggested dependence and subservience to the fraternity, in 1979, the by-laws of the organization were amended to establish the Alpha Phi Omega Service Sorority and to create the Office of the Vice President for Sorority Affairs to fully recognize women's membership in the fraternity. The organization was renamed Alpha Phi Omega International Philippines Incorporated Service Fraternity and Sorority.

In 2023, Alpha Phi Omega elected its first woman national president.

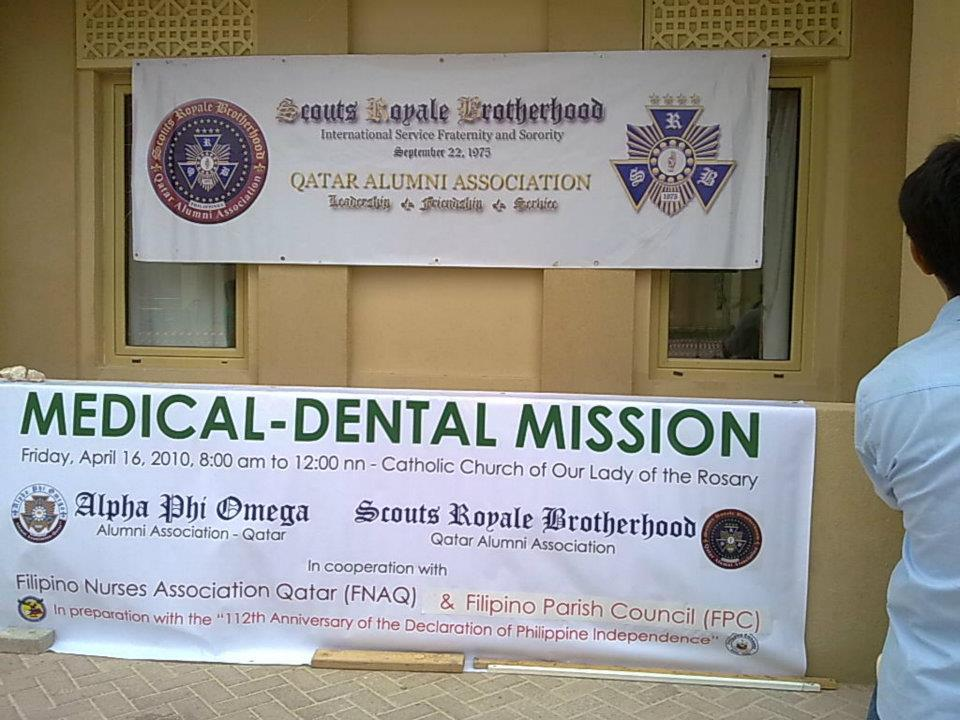
A medical mission in Qatar jointly organized in 2012 by members of Alpha Phi Omega and Scouts Royale Brotherhood

=== Association with Scouts Royale Brotherhood ===
On September 22, 1975, four members of the APO Alpha Delta chapter in San Sebastian College – Recoletos established the Scouts Royale Brotherhood (SRB), a fraternity exclusively for high school students. SRB was initially intended to be the youth arm of APO, as both fraternities share the same traditions, core principles, motto, colors, and symbols. Today however, SRB is nominally an independent and separate entity from APO that has expanded its membership to include college students as well. Despite this, many outside observers still consider SRB as the "youth arm" of APO.

== Symbols ==
Official seal of Alpha Phi Omega Philippines

The fraternity's motto is "Be a Leader, Be a Friend, Be of Service". Its slogan is "Do a Good Turn Daily".

Its colors are royal blue and old glory gold. Its symbol is the gold eagle. Its flower is the forget-me-not. Its tree is the study oak. Its jewel is the diamond.

The fraternity's publication is The Torch & Trefoil.

== Organization ==
The national organization of APO maintains a seven-layer administrative structure:

- General Assembly
- National Executive Council
- Board of Directors
- Administrative Regions
- Basic Organizational Units
- Adjudicatory Council
- Constitutional Commissions

=== National Office ===
The National Office for Alpha Phi Omega of the Philippines is at 301-A Two Seventy Midtower Condominium, 270 Ermin Garcia Street, Barangay Silangan, Cubao, Quezon City. Past locations of the Alpha Phi Omega of the Philippines office include:

Years	Location
1950–1975	Office of Godofredo Neric, Boy Scouts of the Philippines National Headquarters building at 181 Concepcion Street, Ermita, Manila.
1975–1977	Residence of Dr. Librado I. Ureta in Taytay, Rizal
1977–1978	Residence of Mel S. Gonzales Jr. in Tondo, Manila
1978–1983	Office of Jose V. Cutaran in Cubao, Quezon City, Metro Manila
1983–1986	Office of Efren Neri at Comfoods building in Gil Puyat Avenue, Makati, Metro Manila
1986–1988	Office of Col. Oscar V. Lazo Jr. at Borres Building in Cubao, Quezon City, Metro Manila
1988–1993	Don Calvo building in Escolta, Manila (leased)
1993–1999	2nd Floor, V.V. Soliven Complex, Epifanio de los Santos Avenue, San Juan, Metro Manila (Leased)
1999 – Current	301-A Midtower Condominium, 270 Ermin Garcia Street, Barangay Silangan, Cubao, Quezon City, Metro Manila. The current National Executive Director is Dennis M. Dumaup, from Delta Kappa Chapter.

== Activities ==
=== National Programs ===
Since 1976, the national leadership of Alpha Phi Omega has formulated a two-year national program for all chapters to emphasize a particular project or need of the community. Such projects include national blood donation drives, medical missions, volunteer drives, tree planting, relief operations, and internal organization strengthening.

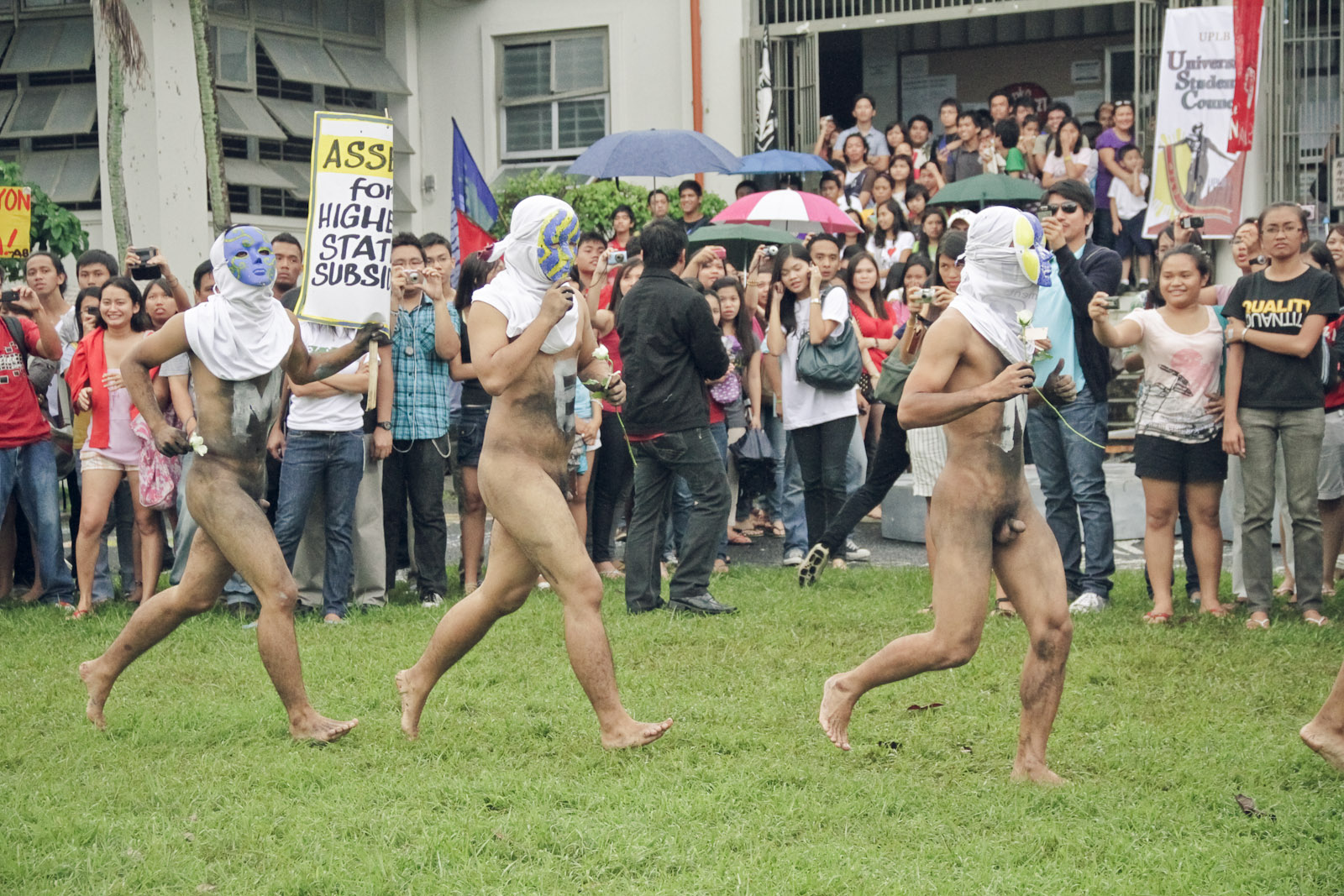
The 2010 Oblation Run at the University of the Philippines Los Baños

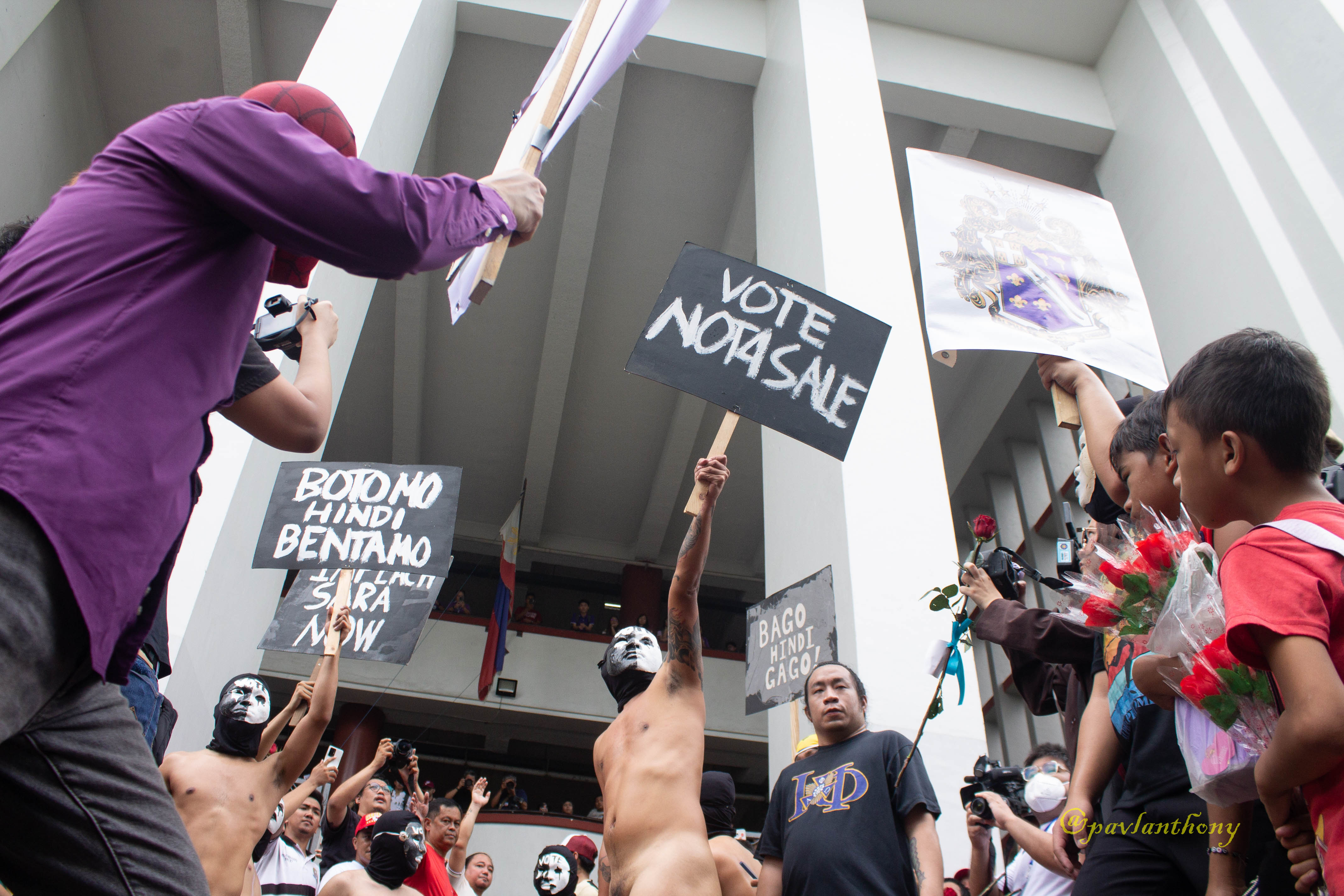
Members of the Alpha Phi Omega fraternity conducting the annual Oblation Run Protest, February 14, 2025 in Palma Hall, University of the Philippines Diliman

=== Oblation Run ===
The Oblation Run is an annual event held by the Alpha Phi Omega chapters in various campuses of the University of the Philippines and the Polytechnic University of the Philippines, where male members of APO wearing masks run naked in public places along a designated route. The run is named after the Oblation statue, which depicts a naked man facing upwards with arms outstretched to symbolize selfless devotion. It is typically held annually on December 16 to celebrate the international founding day of Alpha Phi Omega.

Contrary to popular belief, all of the runners are volunteer members, as neophytes are forbidden from participating.

Since 1999, the Oblation Run has been used as a protest platform to raise awareness for national issues such as education budget cuts, political corruption, environmental degradation, and human rights violations.

== Chapters ==
The APO has charters (either fraternity, sorority, or both) at 250 colleges and universities.

== Chapter and member misconduct ==
=== Hazing deaths ===
Alpha Phi Omega has been directly involved in the hazing deaths of several neophytes.

- In 1967, University of the Philippines Diliman student Ferdinand Tabtab died from injuries sustained from hazing. This was the first recorded hazing death in the fraternity.
- On October 13, 1991, Frederick Cahiyang, an 18-year-old civil engineering student from University of the Visayas, died during the initiation rites of the fraternity. This was the first publicized death from hazing in Cebu schools.
- On August 22, 2004, Jonathan Bombase, a freshman student from Partido College in Goa, Camarines Sur, succumbed to his injuries a week after undergoing initiation rites with Alpha Phi Omega.
- On January 14, 2006, University of the Philippines Los Baños student Marlon Villanueva died during the initiation rites of the fraternity. Villanueva's case saw the first conviction under the Anti-Hazing Act of 1995. Two Alpha Phi Omega members were sentenced to reclusion perpetua in a 2015 decision.
- On May 6, 2006, Jan Angelo Dollete of the Capiz State University died during the initiation rites of the fraternity. Homicide charges were filed against 11 officers of Alpha Phi Omega.
- On August 15, 2010, the bruised body of University of Makati student EJ Karl Initia was found discarded in a ravine in Santa Maria, Laguna after undergoing initiation rites. Eleven officers of Alpha Phi Omega were charged with his death.

According to the ABS-CBN Investigative and Research Group, Alpha Phi Omega has the second highest number of recorded hazing deaths among all Filipino fraternities, with six deaths as of March 2, 2023.

=== 2010 Philippine Bar exam bombing ===
On September 26, 2010, a grenade exploded outside De La Salle University in Manila minutes after the end of the 2010 Philippine Bar Examination, injuring 47 people, with two people needing amputations. Initial police investigations revealed that the grenade was targeted at members of Tau Gamma Phi, with whom Alpha Phi Omega had a conflict with. However, the grenade fell short and exploded near a group of Alpha Phi Beta members along with several female exam takers. The National Bureau of Investigation (NBI) took over the investigation and identified Alpha Phi Omega as the perpetrator of the blast, as well as two other previous grenade attacks on college campuses in Metro Manila.

On October 27, 2010, the NBI's prime suspect Anthony Leal Nepomuceno, a 26-year-old call center agent and APO member, surrendered to vice president Jejomar Binay, who was also an APO member. Nepomuceno denied all accusations, with Binay and APO defending his innocence. In response, several members of the House of Representatives criticized Binay for clearing Nepomuceno while the investigation was still ongoing.

On April 28, 2011, the Department of Justice (DOJ) recommended the indictment of Nepomuceno after finding his defense "weak", and charged him with multiple murder for causing "almost fatal" wounds to victims Raissa Laurel and Jokat Ledda. Nepomuceno was also charged with multiple frustrated murder, multiple attempted murder, and illegal possession of explosives. On July 14, 2015, the Court of Appeals affirmed Nepomuceno's indictment and denied his petition to nullify the 2011 DOJ resolution.

=== Rivalry with Tau Gamma Phi ===
Alpha Phi Omega has been involved in several fatal clashes with long-standing rival fraternity Tau Gamma Phi:

- On August 30, 1977. 1977, UP Diliman student and APO member Rolando Abad was killed in a clash with members of Tau Gamma Phi.
- On February 21, 1994, Central Colleges of the Philippines student Fernando Obrino, a member of Tau Gamma Phi, died at St. Luke's Medical Center after being mauled in Cubao, Quezon City by four fellow students who were members of APO.
- On October 24, 2004, police found the body of 33-year-old Ronaldo de Guzman on a bench outside National University in Manila. De Guzman was an elder of the Scouts Royale Brotherhood, which police identified as the youth arm of Alpha Phi Omega. Witnesses reported four gunmen, who were identified as members of Tau Gamma Phi, threatening the younger members before shooting the elder three times in the face.
- On March 20, 2008, a grenade targeting members of Tau Gamma Phi exploded in front of La Consolacion College Manila, leaving 22 people injured. Police blamed a fraternity rivalry as the motive behind the explosion, but initially refused to identify the perpetrators' organization. On November 9, 2010, justice secretary Leila de Lima tagged APO as the culprit in the grenade attack.
- On December 18, 2009, San Sebastian College student and APO member Cromwell Duka Jr. was fatally stabbed in the school cafeteria by fellow student Efrain Lim, a member of Tau Gamma Phi.

== See also ==
- List of fraternities and sororities in the Philippines
- Service fraternities and sororitiesf
- List of Alpha Phi Omega chapters (USA)
- List of Alpha Phi Omega members (USA)
