= List of Alpha Phi Omega chapters =

Alpha Phi Omega is a coeducational collegiate service fraternity, founded at Lafayette College in Easton, Pennsylvania in 1925. It has active chapters at over 350 colleges and universities. Alpha Phi Omega also has several extension efforts, which are groups that are preparing to become active chapters. Such groups begin as interest groups, then become petitioning groups as the last step before gaining (or regaining) their charter and becoming active chapters. Alpha Phi Omega organizes its U.S. chapters into 18 geographical regions designated by letters.

== Chapters ==
In the following list of North American Alpha Phi Omega chapters, active chapters are indicated in bold and inactive chapters and institutions are in italics.

No.	Chapter	Charter date and range	Institution	Location	Region	Status	Ref.
1	**Alpha**	December 16, 1925 – February 13, 1993; January 27, 2018	Lafayette College	Easton, Pennsylvania	O	Active	
2	**Beta**	January 11, 1927 – 1938; 1946–c. 1989; December 1, 1990	University of Pittsburgh	Pittsburgh, Pennsylvania	O	Active	
3	**Gamma**	February 17, 1927	Cornell University	Ithaca, New York	Q	Active	
4	**Delta**	November 8, 1927	Auburn University	Auburn, Alabama	J	Active	
5	**Epsilon**	December 13, 1927 – 1934; 1939–1944; 1946	Truman State University	Kirksville, Missouri	C	Active	
6	Zeta	May 9, 1928 – June 23, 2018	Stanford University	Stanford, California	A	Inactive	
7	**Eta**	November 27, 1928	Northern Illinois University	DeKalb, Illinois	F	Active	
8	**Theta**	February 9, 1929 – 19xx ?; 1949–19xx ?; 1962	University of Virginia	Charlottesville, Virginia	M	Active	
9	Iota	March 25, 1929 – 1990	Park University	Parkville, Missouri	C	Inactive	
10	**Kappa**	April 29, 1929	Carnegie Mellon University	Pittsburgh, Pennsylvania	O	Active	
11	Lambda	February 2, 1929 – 1984	University of Kansas	Lawrence, Kansas	C	Inactive	
12	**Mu**	December 15, 1929 – July 1979; October 4, 1981	Indiana University Bloomington	Bloomington, Indiana	H	Active	
13	Nu	December 12, 1929 – 1988	Upsala College	East Orange, New Jersey	P	Inactive	
14	**Xi**	May 21, 1930 – 1978; September 24, 1994	Iowa State University	Ames, Iowa	E	Active	
15	**Omicron**	May 20, 1930 – 1971; April 29, 1984	University of Iowa	Iowa City, Iowa	E	Active	
16	**Pi**	May 17, 1930 – c. 1940; 1947	Kansas State University	Manhattan, Kansas	C	Active	(Note: Chapter went inactive during World War II.)
17	**Rho**	May 19, 1930	University of North Carolina at Chapel Hill	Chapel Hill, North Carolina	L	Active	
18	Sigma	January 11, 1931 – 1940; 1957–late 1960s; 1980 – July 13, 2002; January 23, 2011 – 20xx ?	Northwestern University	Evanston, Illinois	F	Inactive	
19	**Tau**	April 14, 1931 – c. 1962; May 26, 1968 – 1970; March 1, 1974	University of Florida	Gainesville, Florida	K	Active	
20	Upsilon	May 16, 1931 – 1969	University of Wisconsin–Milwaukee	Milwaukee, Wisconsin	E	Inactive	
21	**Phi**	October 2, 1931	Syracuse University	Syracuse, New York	Q	Active	
22	**Chi**	November 13, 1931 – 1979; February 1, 1997	University of California at Los Angeles	Los Angeles, California	B	Active	
23	**Psi**	December 10, 1931 – c. 1966; 1967–1984; January 14, 2012	University of California Santa Barbara	Santa Barbara, California	B	Active	
24	**Omega**	October 24, 1931 – 1989; May 11, 1990	Drake University	Des Moines, Iowa	E	Active	
25	**Alpha Alpha**	March 31, 1932	University of Illinois at Urbana-Champaign	Urbana, Illinois	F	Active	
26	**Alpha Beta**	May 26, 1932 – c. 1940; 1948	Pennsylvania State University	University Park, Pennsylvania	O	Active	
27	**Alpha Gamma**	May 20, 1932	Purdue University	West Lafayette, Indiana	H	Active	
28	**Alpha Delta**	June 14, 1932 – 1983; May 1, 1993 – February 10, 2001; May 10, 2008	San Diego State University	San Diego, California	B	Active	
29	**Alpha Epsilon**	May 31, 1932 – 1972; February 1, 1980	Louisiana State University	Baton Rouge, Louisiana	J	Active	
30	**Alpha Zeta**	March 13, 1933 – 1959; May 5, 1994	University of Kentucky	Lexington, Kentucky	I	Active	
31	**Alpha Eta**	May 22, 1934 – 197x ?; April 27, 1990	University of Missouri-Kansas City	Kansas City, Missouri	C	Active	
32	Alpha Theta	May 1, 1934 – 1957	University of Nebraska Omaha	Omaha, Nebraska	C	Inactive	
33	**Alpha Iota**	May 29, 1934	Ohio State University	Columbus, Ohio	H	Active	
34	**Alpha Kappa**	June 3, 1934 – c. 1957; May 21, 1967 – 19xx ?; October 30, 1989	University of Southern California	Los Angeles, California	B	Active	
35	**Alpha Lambda**	November 7, 1934 – 1972; November 14, 1998	North Dakota State University	Fargo, North Dakota	E	Active	
36	Alpha Mu	December 28, 1934 – July 12, 2003	William Jewell College	Liberty, Missouri	C	Inactive	
37	Alpha Nu	March 24, 1935 – 1965	St. Norbert College	De Pere, Wisconsin	E	Inactive	
38	Alpha Xi	May 5, 1935 – 1975; April 23, 1995 – July 10, 2010	Washington State University	Pullman, Washington	A	Inactive	
39	**Alpha Omicron**	May 26, 1935	Southern Methodist University	Dallas, Texas	D	Active	
40	Alpha Pi	May 22, 1935 – 1984; 2012–20xx ?	University of Miami	Coral Gables, Florida	K	Inactive	
41	**Alpha Rho**	May 25, 1935	University of Texas at Austin	Austin, Texas	D	Active	
42	Alpha Sigma	June 5, 1935 – 1968; December 10, 1994 – July 14, 2007	University of Nebraska–Lincoln	Lincoln, Nebraska	C	Inactive	
43	**Alpha Tau**	March 22, 1936	Butler University	Indianapolis, Indiana	H	Active	
44	Alpha Upsilon	March 22, 1936 – 1969; April 2, 2006 – 20xx ?	DePauw University	Greencastle, Indiana	H	Inactive	
45	**Alpha Phi**	May 1, 1936	Washington University in St. Louis	St. Louis, Missouri	C	Active	
46	Alpha Chi	April 17, 1936 – c. 1940; January 18, 1948 – June 19, 2021	Massachusetts Institute of Technology	Cambridge, Massachusetts	R	Inactive	
47	Alpha Psi	May 7, 1936 – c. 1940; May 1947–20xx ?	Lehigh University	Bethlehem, Pennsylvania	O	Inactive	
48	**Alpha Omega**	May 17, 1936	Kirksville College of Osteopathic Medicine	Kirksville, Missouri	C	Active	
49	Beta Alpha	January 31, 1937 – 1968	Wichita State University	Wichita, Kansas	C	Inactive	
50	**Beta Beta**	April 24, 1937	Michigan State University	East Lansing, Michigan	G	Active	
51	Beta Gamma	June 6, 1937 – 1943; May 11, 2013 – July 15, 2022	Central YMCA College	Chicago, Illinois	F	Inactive	
51	Beta Gamma	June 6, 1937 – 1943; May 11, 2013 – July 15, 2022	Roosevelt University	Chicago, Illinois	F	Inactive	
52	Beta Delta	November 7, 1937 – February 6, 2010	Texas A&M University at Commerce	Commerce, Texas	D	Inactive	
53	Beta Epsilon	March 12, 1938 – January 26, 2019	University of Northern Iowa	Cedar Falls, Iowa	E	Inactive	
54	Beta Zeta	May 22, 1938 – 1987; April 8, 1995 – June 27, 2020	University of Georgia	Athens, Georgia	J	Inactive	
55	**Beta Eta**	April 10, 1938	University of Missouri	Columbia, Missouri	C	Active	
56	**Beta Theta**	May 15, 1938 – 1977; December 11, 2004	University of Wisconsin–Madison	Madison, Wisconsin	E	Active	
57	**Beta Iota**	June 2, 1938 – 19xx ?; February 29, 1993	New York University	New York City, New York	P	Active	
58	Beta Kappa	December 5, 1938 – 1990	University of Central Missouri	Warrensburg, Missouri	C	Inactive	
59	**Beta Lambda**	December 18, 1938 – 1989; January 30, 1993 – February 16, 2002	Indiana State University	Terre Haute, Indiana	H	Active	
60	Beta Mu	January 19, 1939 – June 27, 2015	Missouri State University	Springfield, Missouri	C	Inactive	
61	Beta Nu	December 31, 1938 – c. 1940; 194x ?–1981	Northeastern State University	Tahlequah, Oklahoma	C	Inactive	
62	Beta Xi	December 4, 1938 – 1981	Westminster College	Fulton, Missouri	C	Inactive	
63	Beta Omicron	March 12, 1939 – June 28, 2014	Missouri University of Science and Technology	Rolla, Missouri	C	Inactive	
64	**Beta Pi**	January 30, 1939 – 1975; December 6, 1998	University of Tulsa	Tulsa, Oklahoma	C	Active	
65	**Beta Rho**	April 2, 1939 – c. 1940; March 9, 1947 – 197x ?; November 8, 1980	University of Arkansas	Fayetteville, Arkansas	C	Active	
66	**Beta Sigma**	April 30, 1939	Texas Tech University	Lubbock, Texas	D	Active	
67	Beta Tau	March 31, 1940 – 1973	Washburn University	Topeka, Kansas	C	Inactive	
68	Beta Upsilon	May 21, 1939 – 1984; February 21, 2016 – July 15, 2022	Northwest Missouri State University	Maryville, Missouri	C	Inactive	
69	Beta Phi	May 19, 1939 – July 1991 ?	University of Louisiana at Lafayette	Lafayette, Louisiana	J	Inactive	
70	Beta Chi	March 31, 1939 – 1957	Oklahoma City University	Oklahoma City, Oklahoma	C	Inactive	
71	**Beta Psi**	May 12, 1939	Southeast Missouri State University	Cape Girardeau, Missouri	C	Active	
72	Beta Omega	March 31, 1939 – 1940	Oklahoma Baptist University	Shawnee, Oklahoma	C	Inactive	
73	**Gamma Alpha**	December 9, 1939 – 1978; May 30, 1992	University of Washington	Seattle, Washington	A	Active	
74	**Gamma Beta**	December 6, 1939 – 197x ?; April 7, 1984	San Jose State University	San Jose, California	A	Active	
75	**Gamma Gamma**	December 6, 1939 – 1971; April 2, 1977	University of California, Berkeley	Berkeley, California	A	Active	
76	**Gamma Delta**	September 24, 1939 – 1965; September 15, 2013	Baruch College	New York City, New York	P	Active	
77	Gamma Epsilon	September 24, 1939 – 1967	City College of New York	New York City, New York	P	Inactive	
78	**Gamma Zeta**	December 16, 1939	Georgia Tech	Atlanta, Georgia	J	Active	
79	Gamma Eta	January 21, 1940 – 1978	Springfield College	Springfield, Massachusetts	R	Inactive	
80	**Gamma Theta**	May 11, 1941 – 194x ?; January 18, 1953	University of Colorado Boulder	Boulder, Colorado	C	Active	
81	Gamma Iota	June 25, 1940 – 1984	Brooklyn College	Brooklyn, New York	P	Inactive	
82	**Gamma Kappa**	May 21, 1950	Texas Christian University	Ft. Worth, Texas	D	Active	
83	**Gamma Lambda**	October 6, 1940	Clemson University	Clemson, South Carolina	L	Active	
84	Gamma Mu	May 25, 1940 – 1956	University of Evansville	Evansville, Indiana	H	Inactive	
85	Gamma Nu	May 25, 1941 – July 16, 1994; May 10, 1997 – July 10, 2010	University of Idaho	Moscow, Idaho	A	Inactive	
86	**Gamma Xi**	December 13, 1940	Rockhurst University	Kansas City, Missouri	C	Active	
87	Gamma Omicron	December 15, 1940 – 1982	Queens College, City University of New York	Flushing, New York	P	Inactive	
88	**Gamma Pi**	November 17, 1940 – c. 1941; 1944	University of Michigan	Ann Arbor, Michigan	G	Active	
89	**Gamma Rho**	May 17, 1942	University of North Texas	Denton, Texas	D	Active	
90	**Gamma Sigma**	November 16, 1940 – 1962; April 6, 1997	University of Chicago	Chicago, Illinois	F	Active	
91	Gamma Tau	May 4, 1941 – 1977	Louisiana Tech University	Ruston, Louisiana	J	Inactive	
92	**Gamma Upsilon**	March 23, 1941 – 1975; November 15, 2009	Tulane University	New Orleans, Louisiana	J	Active	
93	Gamma Phi	March 16, 1941 – 1978; December 10, 1994 – January 30, 2016 – 20xx ?	Western Michigan University	Kalamazoo, Michigan	G	Inactive	
94	Gamma Chi	May 3, 1941 – June 22, 2019	Samford University	Homewood, Alabama	J	Inactive	
95	**Gamma Psi**	April 18, 1942 – 1980; December 9, 2000 – July 14, 2007; May 11, 2013	University of Minnesota	Minneapolis, Minnesota	E	Active	
96	Gamma Omega	May 9, 1942 – 1965	New York University-University Heights	New York City, New York	P	Inactive	
97	**Delta Alpha**	May 26, 1942 – 19xx ?; December 2, 1990	University of Cincinnati	Cincinnati, Ohio	H	Active	
98	**Delta Beta**	May 24, 1942 – 1943; 1946	University of Oklahoma	Norman, Oklahoma	C	Active	
99	**Delta Gamma**	December 1, 1942	Ohio University	Athens, Ohio	H	Active	
100	**Delta Delta**	August 23, 1944 – 1971; March 31, 1990	Saint Louis University	St. Louis, Missouri	C	Active	
101	Delta Epsilon	June 15, 1945 – 1989	Illinois Institute of Technology	Chicago, Illinois	F	Inactive	
102	**Delta Zeta**	December 16, 1945 – 1971; April 25, 1992	University of Pennsylvania	Philadelphia, Pennsylvania	P	Active	
103	Delta Eta	June 9, 1946 – 1978; April 25, 1998 – July 10, 2010	Oregon State University	Corvallis, Oregon	A	Inactive	
104	**Delta Theta**	June 22, 1946	University of Louisville	Louisville, Kentucky	I	Active	
105	Delta Iota	November 14, 1946 – 1985; October 4, 1996 – June 19, 2021	Mercer University	Macon, Georgia	J	Petitioning Group	
106	**Delta Kappa**	November 14, 1946 – 19xx ?; April 28, 1989	Emory University	Atlanta, Georgia	J	Active	
107	**Delta Lambda**	December 13, 1946 – 1967; February 23, 2019	Coe College	Cedar Rapids, Iowa	E	Active	
108	Delta Mu	December 15, 1946 – 1973; December 5, 1998 – June 25, 2016	Pittsburg State University	Pittsburg, Kansas	C	Inactive	
109	Delta Nu	December 15, 1946 – 1980; April 25, 1993 – July 10, 2010	Yale University	New Haven, Connecticut	R	Inactive	
110	**Delta Xi**	January 19, 1947	Ball State University	Muncie, Indiana	H	Active	
111	Delta Omicron	March 9, 1947 – 20xx ?	Wabash College	Crawfordsville, Indiana	H	Inactive	
112	**Delta Pi**	February 8, 1947	Trinity University	San Antonio, Texas	D	Inactive	
113	**Delta Rho**	April 21, 1947	Rutgers, The State University of New Jersey	New Brunswick, New Jersey	P	Active	
114	**Delta Sigma**	January 12, 1947	University of Connecticut	Storrs, Connecticut	R	Active	
115	Delta Tau	February 22, 1947 – February 6, 2010	University of New Mexico	Albuquerque, New Mexico	B	Inactive	
116	Delta Upsilon	February 2, 1947 – July 13, 2002	East Stroudsburg University of Pennsylvania	East Stroudsburg, Pennsylvania	O	Inactive	
117	Delta Phi	April 17, 1947 – July 16, 1994; February 29, 2004 – June 25, 2016	Johnson C. Smith University	Charlotte, North Carolina	L	Inactive	
118	Delta Chi	March 21, 1947 – 1978	Texas A&M University - Kingsville	Kingsville, Texas	D	Inactive	
119	Delta Psi	March 30, 1947 – 196x ?; 19xx ?–1979; xxxx ? – January 28, 2017	Eastern Illinois University	Charleston, Illinois	F	Inactive	
120	Delta Omega	April 13, 1947 – January 30, 2016	University of Houston	Houston, Texas	D	Inactive	
121	Epsilon Alpha	April 20, 1947 – 1985	Emporia State University	Emporia, Kansas	C	Inactive	
122	Epsilon Beta	May 16, 1947 – April 21, 1975; April 11, 1980 – 20xx ?	Central Michigan University	Mt. Pleasant, Michigan	G	Inactive	
123	Epsilon Gamma	May 18, 1947 – 1969; May 8, 1977 – January 28, 2017	Alfred University	Alfred, New York	Q	Inactive	
124	Epsilon Delta	May 18, 1947 – February 5, 2000	Central Connecticut State University	New Britain, Connecticut	R	Inactive	
125	Epsilon Epsilon	May 25, 1947 – July 15, 1995	Missouri Valley College	Marshall, Missouri	C	Inactive	
126	**Epsilon Zeta**	May 11, 1947	Rensselaer Polytechnic Institute	Troy, New York	Q	Active	
127	**Epsilon Eta**	June 20, 1947 – 1985; December 5, 1998	University of West Georgia	Carrollton, Georgia	J	Active	
128	Epsilon Theta	May 25, 1947 – 19xx ?; April 30, 1990 –January 25, 2014	University of North Dakota	Grand Forks, North Dakota	E	Inactive	
129	Epsilon Iota	May 17, 1947 – 1984; August 27, 2011 – June 23, 2018	Mississippi State University	Mississippi State, Mississippi	J	Inactive	
130	Epsilon Kappa	May 25, 1947 – 1954; December 5, 1998 – July 10, 2010	Willamette University	Marshall, Missouri	A	Inactive	
131	**Epsilon Lambda**	December 12, 1947	Michigan Technological University	Houghton, Michigan	G	Active	
132	**Epsilon Mu**	May 25, 1947	University of Maryland, College Park	College Park, Maryland	N	Active	
133	**Epsilon Nu**	December 13, 1947 – 19xx ?; March 24, 1990	State University of New York at Oswego	Oswego, New York	Q	Active	
134	**Epsilon Xi**	December 13, 1947	Colorado State University	Fort Collins, Colorado	C	Active	
135	Epsilon Omicron	January 11, 1948 – 1962	Long Island University Brooklyn	Brooklyn, New York	P	Inactive	
136	**Epsilon Pi**	February 22, 1948 – 1984; November 10, 2001	Shurtleff College	Edwardsville, Illinois	C	Active	
136	**Epsilon Pi**	February 22, 1948 – 1984; November 10, 2001	Southern Illinois University at Edwardsville	Edwardsville, Illinois	C	Active	
137	Epsilon Rho	February 6, 1948 – 1976	Eastern Washington University	Cheney, Washington	A	Inactive	
138	**Epsilon Sigma**	February 15, 1948 – 19xx ?; May 5, 1989	SUNY at Buffalo	Buffalo, New York	Q	Active	
139	Epsilon Tau	March 7, 1948 – 1988	University of Alabama	Tuscaloosa, Alabama	J	Petitioning Group	
140	Epsilon Upsilon	March 7, 1948 – 1978	University of Wisconsin–Oshkosh	Oshkosh, Wisconsin	E	Inactive	
141	Epsilon Phi	February 13, 1948 – 1978	Youngstown State University	Youngstown, Ohio	H	Inactive	
142	Epsilon Chi	April 7, 1948 – 1978	Los Angeles City College	Los Angeles, California	B	Inactive	
143	**Epsilon Psi**	March 12, 1948	Kent State University	Kent, Ohio	H	Active	
144	**Epsilon Omega**	May 2, 1948 – 1984; December 5, 2004	University of Mississippi	University, Mississippi	J	Active	
145	Zeta Alpha	May 16, 1948 – 20xx ?	Bradley University	Peoria, Illinois	F	Inactive	
146	**Zeta Beta**	May 30, 1948	Virginia Tech	Blacksburg, Virginia	M	Active	
147	**Zeta Gamma**	May 16, 1948	Valparaiso University	Valparaiso, Indiana	F	Active	
148	**Zeta Delta**	May 16, 1948	Miami University	Oxford, Ohio	H	Active	
149	Zeta Epsilon	May 11, 1948 – 1957; December 11, 1993 – January 25, 2014	Gustavus Adolphus College	St. Peter, Minnesota	E	Inactive	
150	Zeta Zeta	May 16, 1948 – 1975	Graceland University	Lamoni, Iowa	E	Inactive	
151	Zeta Eta	May 15, 1948 – 1959	University of Tennessee at Chattanooga	Chattanooga, Tennessee	I	Inactive	
152	**Zeta Theta**	May 16, 1948	Drexel University	Philadelphia, Pennsylvania	P	Active	
153	**Zeta Iota**	May 18, 1948 – 1973; September 9, 2012	Temple University	Philadelphia, Pennsylvania	P	Active	
154	**Zeta Kappa**	May 22, 1948	Bowling Green State University	Bowling Green, Ohio	H	Active	
155	**Zeta Lambda**	May 22, 1948 – 19xx ?; November 29, 1992	University of Toledo	Toledo, Ohio	H	Active	
156	**Zeta Mu**	May 22, 1948 – 1956; March 28, 1992	Catholic University of America	Washington, D.C.	N	Active	
157	Zeta Nu	May 23, 1948 – 1994; April 21, 2002 – July 14, 2007	Southern Illinois University Carbondale	Carbondale, Illinois	C	Inactive	
158	Zeta Xi	May 22, 1948 – 1965	Southern Oregon University	Ashland, Oregon	A	Inactive	
159	**Zeta Omicron**	May 24, 1948 – 1983; June 6, 1992	California Polytechnic State University, San Luis Obispo	San Luis Obispo, California	B	Active	
160	Zeta Pi	May 27, 1948 – 1955; December 9, 2006 – June 27, 2015	Wayne State University	Detroit, Michigan	G	Inactive	
161	**Zeta Rho**	May 23, 1948 – 1969; April 26, 1998 – February 7, 2004; April 10, 2016	Wittenberg University	Springfield, Ohio	H	Active	
162	**Zeta Sigma**	May 24, 1948	University of Delaware	Newark, Delaware	P	Active	
163	Zeta Tau	May 26, 1948 – March 1, 2021	Central Methodist University	Fayette, Missouri	C	Inactive	
164	**Zeta Upsilon**	May 28, 1948 – 19xx ?; December 15, 1990	Boston University	Boston, Massachusetts	R	Active	
165	**Zeta Phi**	May 29, 1948 – 19xx ?; 1986 – July 11, 1998; April 26, 2003	Howard University	Washington, D.C.	N	Active	
166	Zeta Chi	June 2, 1948 – 1973	Centenary College of Louisiana	Shreveport, Louisiana	J	Inactive	
167	**Zeta Psi**	June 6, 1948 – 1967; April 17, 1993	University of Oregon	Eugene, Oregon	A	Active	
168	**Zeta Omega**	December 15, 1948 – 1972; May 1, 1982	Baylor University	Waco, Texas	D	Active	
169	**Eta Alpha**	December 12, 1948 – 1956; May 28, 2018	Santa Clara University	Santa Clara, California	A	Active	
170	Eta Beta	December 16, 1948 – 19xx ?; September 8, 1990 – June 28, 2014	Simpson College	Indianola, Iowa	E	Inactive	
171	**Eta Gamma**	December 12, 1948 – 1964; April 23, 2016	Union College	Schenectady, New York	Q	Active	
172	Eta Delta	December 12, 1948 – 1963	Keene State College	Keene, New Hampshire	R	Inactive	
173	**Eta Epsilon**	February 13, 1949	Millikin University	Decatur, Illinois	F	Active	
174	Eta Zeta	February 19, 1949 – 1954; September 17, 1998 – July 10, 2010	Montana State University	Bozeman, Montana	A	Inactive	
175	**Eta Eta**	February 27, 1949 – June 23, 2018; July 16, 2022	Arizona State University	Tempe, Arizona	B	Active	
176	Eta Theta	April 3, 1949 – 1952	Idaho State University	Pocatello, Idaho	A	Inactive	
177	Eta Iota	May 20, 1949 – July 14, 2000	Millersville University of Pennsylvania	Millersville, Pennsylvania	O	Inactive	
178	Eta Kappa	May 15, 1949 – July 19, 1986; December 26, 1998 – January 30, 2016	University of Wisconsin–Stout	Menomonie, Wisconsin	E	Inactive	
179	Eta Lambda	May 1, 1949 – July 15, 2022	University of Wisconsin–Eau Claire	Eau Claire, Wisconsin	E	Inactive	
180	Eta Mu	May 7, 1949 – July 11, 1998; September 26, 2015 – 20xx ?	Utica College	Utica, New York	Q	Inactive	
181	Eta Nu	May 22, 1949 – 1958	Saint John's University	Collegeville, Minnesota	E	Inactive	
182	Eta Xi	May 15, 1949 – 1979; April 10, 1994 – July 10, 2010	Central Washington University	Ellensburg, Washington	A	Inactive	
183	Eta Omicron	May 22, 1949 – February 13, 1993	Brigham Young University	Provo, Utah	B	Inactive	
184	**Eta Pi**	May 1, 1949 – 1969; December 16, 1995	University of Detroit Mercy	Detroit, Michigan	G	Active	
185	Eta Rho	May 8, 1949 – 1967; February 10, 2018 – 20xx ?	Marquette University	Milwaukee, Wisconsin	E	Inactive	
186	**Eta Sigma**	May 13, 1949	Illinois College	Jacksonville, Illinois	F	Active	
187	Eta Tau	May 15, 1949 – 1988	West Texas A&M University	Canyon, Texas	D	Inactive	
188	**Eta Upsilon**	May 15, 1949	Marshall University	Huntington, West Virginia	I	Active	
189	**Eta Phi**	May 15, 1949 – 1977; November 7, 1998	American University	Washington, D.C.	N	Active	
190	**Eta Chi**	May 15, 1949	Hardin–Simmons University	Abilene, Texas	D	Active	
191	Eta Psi	May 15, 1949 – 1958; April 17, 1964 – 1978; May 9, 1992 – July 14, 2007; May 2, 2015 – June 23, 2018	California State University, Chico	Chico, California	A	Inactive	
192	Eta Omega	May 27, 1949 – 1981	University of Montana	Missoula, Montana	A	Inactive	
193	**Theta Alpha**	May 20, 1949 – 1966; March 4, 2000	Stevens Institute of Technology	Hoboken, New Jersey	P	Active	
194	Theta Beta	May 21, 1949 – 1972; January 19, 1997 – July 14, 2001	Cleveland State University	Cleveland, Ohio	H	Inactive	
195	Theta Gamma	May 17, 1949 – 1950	Hendrix College	Conway, Arkansas	C	Inactive	
196	Theta Delta	May 22, 1949 – 1966; April 27, 1980 – January 25, 2014	Waynesburg University	Waynesburg, Pennsylvania	O	Inactive	
197	**Theta Epsilon**	May 28, 1949	Illinois State University	Normal, Illinois	F	Active	
198	**Theta Zeta**	June 5, 1949 – 195x ?; October 28, 1967 – 1976; September 26, 1987	University of New Hampshire	Durham, New Hampshire	R	Active	
199	Theta Eta	August 23, 1949 – July 8, 2006	Kansas City University of Medicine and Biosciences	Kansas City, Missouri	C	Inactive	
200	**Theta Theta**	November 13, 1949 – 1950; May 9, 1998	Centre College	Danville, Kentucky	I	Active	
201	Theta Iota	November 8, 1949 – 1985; March 2, 1996 – 20xx ?	University of Arizona	Tucson, Arizona	B	Inactive	
202	**Theta Kappa**	December 11, 1949 – 1968; May 13, 2000	Binghamton University	Vestal, New York	Q	Active	
203	Theta Lambda	December 11, 1949 – 1955	Rice University	Houston, Texas	D	Inactive	
204	**Theta Mu**	January 29, 1950	Vanderbilt University	Nashville, Tennessee	I	Active	
205	Theta Nu	February 19, 1950 – July 19, 1986	Hamline University	Saint Paul, Minnesota	E	Inactive	
206	Theta Xi	February 26, 1950 – July 19, 1997	Parks College of St Louis University	Cahokia, Illinois	C	Inactive	
207	Theta Omicron	April 8, 1950 – 1950	Georgia Southwestern State University	Americus, Georgia	J	Inactive	
208	Theta Pi	May 9, 1950 – 1981	University of Indianapolis	Indianapolis, Indiana	H	Inactive	
209	Theta Rho	May 10, 1950 – 1953; December 13, 1961 – December 30, 1992	Sam Houston State University	Huntsville, Texas	D	Inactive	
210	**Theta Sigma**	May 14, 1950 – 1989; December 16, 1995	Oklahoma State University	Stillwater, Oklahoma	C	Active	
211	Theta Tau	May 13, 1950 – July 12, 2003; August 18, 2013 – 20xx ?	University of Texas at Arlington	Arlington, Texas	D	Inactive	
212	**Theta Upsilon**	May 12, 1950 – 197x ?; December 12, 1992	Case Western Reserve University	Cleveland, Ohio	H	Active	
213	Theta Phi	May 14, 1950 – 1950	Millsaps College	Jackson, Mississippi	J	Inactive	
214	**Theta Chi**	May 14, 1950 – 1971; December 5, 1987	George Washington University	Washington, D.C.	N	Active	
215	Theta Psi	May 19, 1950 – 1980	University of Bridgeport	Bridgeport, Connecticut	R	Inactive	
216	**Theta Omega**	May 21, 1950 – 1952; December 2, 2000	Randolph–Macon College	Ashland, Virginia	M	Active	
217	**Iota Alpha**	May 21, 1950 – 1982; December 6, 1997	University of Tennessee	Knoxville, Tennessee	I	Active	
218	Iota Beta	May 24, 1950 – 1973	Pacific Lutheran University	Tacoma, Washington	A	Inactive	
219	Iota Gamma	May 20, 1950 – 1961; May 8, 2004 – 20xx ?	Towson University	Towson, Maryland	N	Inactive	
220	Iota Delta	May 21, 1950 – 1959	Hiram College	Hiram, Ohio	H	Inactive	
221	Iota Epsilon	May 20, 1950 – 1952	Central State University	Wilberforce, Ohio	H	Inactive	
222	Iota Zeta	May 27, 1950 – 1963	Le Moyne College	Syracuse, New York	Q	Inactive	
223	Iota Eta	May 29, 1950 – 1960	American International College	Springfield, Massachusetts	R	Inactive	
224	Iota Theta	June 6, 1950 – 1963	Rutgers University–Newark	Newark, New Jersey	P	Inactive	
225	Iota Iota	June 3, 1950 – 1952	Portland State University	Portland, Oregon	A	Inactive	
226	**Iota Kappa**	June 4, 1950	Bucknell University	Lewisburg, Pennsylvania	O	Active	
227	**Iota Lambda**	November 26, 1950	North Carolina State University	Raleigh, North Carolina	L	Active	
228	**Iota Mu**	January 19, 1951	University of South Carolina at Columbia	Columbia, South Carolina	L	Active	
229	Iota Nu	February 3, 1951 – 1954	University of Wisconsin–Milwaukee Extension Division	Milwaukee, Wisconsin	E	Inactive	
230	Iota Xi	February 11, 1951 – 19xx ?; December 8, 1990 – June 19, 2021	Edinboro University of Pennsylvania	Edinboro, Pennsylvania	O	Inactive	
231	**Iota Omicron**	February 18, 1951	Gettysburg College	Gettysburg, Pennsylvania	O	Active	
232	Iota Pi	February 25, 1951 – 1968	City College of San Francisco	San Francisco, California	A	Inactive	
233	**Iota Rho**	April 21, 1951	Florida State University	Tallahassee, Florida	K	Active	
234	Iota Sigma	May 13, 1951 – 1968	Midwestern State University	Wichita Falls, Texas	D	Inactive	
235	**Iota Tau**	May 19, 1951	Saint Olaf College	Northfield, Minnesota	E	Active	
236	Iota Upsilon	May 20, 1951 – 1972; February 1982 – February 7, 2004	Slippery Rock University	Slippery Rock, Pennsylvania	O	Inactive	
237	**Iota Phi**	May 27, 1951 – 195x ?; September 20, 1962	University of California, Davis	Davis, California	A	Active	
238	Iota Chi	May 27, 1951 – 19xx ?; November 15, 1990 – January 26, 2018	Northern Michigan University	Marquette, Michigan	G	Inactive	
239	Iota Psi	May 19, 1951 – 1958	University of Utah	Salt Lake City, Utah	B	Inactive	
240	Iota Omega	May 27, 1951 – 1976; May 3, 1997 – June 19, 2021	State University of New York at Brockport	Brockport, New York	Q	Inactive	
241	Kappa Alpha	May 27, 1951 – July 10, 2010	Lamar University	Beaumont, Texas	D	Inactive	
242	Kappa Beta	June 11, 1951 – July 10, 2010	Polytechnic University-Brooklyn	Brooklyn, New York	P	Inactive	(Note: In 2008, Polytechnic was absorbed by NYU and became the New York University Tandon School of Engineering.)
243	Kappa Gamma	May 4, 1952 – 1991	University of Wisconsin–La Crosse	La Crosse, Wisconsin	E	Inactive	
244	**Kappa Delta**	May 10, 1952	Florida A&M University	Tallahassee, Florida	K	Active	
245	Kappa Epsilon	May 10, 1952 – 1977; March 8, 2008 – June 19, 2021	Wagner College	Staten Island, New York	P	Inactive	
246	Kappa Zeta	May 11, 1952 – 1972	Southeastern Oklahoma State University	Durant, Oklahoma	C	Inactive	
247	Kappa Eta	May 18, 1952 – 1991	University of Southern Mississippi	Hattiesburg, Mississippi	J	Inactive	
248	**Kappa Theta**	May 10, 1952	Wake Forest University	Winston-Salem, North Carolina	L	Active	
249	Kappa Iota	May 15, 1952 – 19xx ?; 1981 – July 15, 1995	Hanover College	Hanover, Indiana	H	Inactive	
250	Kappa Kappa	May 17, 1952 – 1972	Western New Mexico University	Silver City, New Mexico	B	Inactive	
251	Kappa Lambda	May 17, 1952 – 1988	Southern University	Baton Rouge, Louisiana	J	Inactive	
252	**Kappa Mu**	May 18, 1952 – 1977; November 14, 1998	Johns Hopkins University	Baltimore, Maryland	N	Active	
253	Kappa Nu	May 18, 1952 – 1953	Grinnell College	Grinnell, Iowa	E	Inactive	
254	Kappa Xi	May 18, 1952 – 1984	Xavier University of Louisiana	New Orleans, Louisiana	J	Inactive	
255	**Kappa Omicron**	May 18, 1952	University of Massachusetts Amherst	Amherst, Massachusetts	R	Active	
256	Kappa Pi	May 18, 1952 – 1987	Wiley College	Marshall, Texas	D	Inactive	
257	Kappa Rho	May 24, 1952 – 1982; May 19, 1995 – June 19, 2021	Seattle University	Seattle, Washington	A	Inactive	
258	**Kappa Sigma**	June 7, 1952 – 1965; January 30, 1983	California State University, Sacramento	Sacramento, California	A	Active	
259	Kappa Tau	February 7, 1953 – February 6, 2010	The Citadel	Charleston, South Carolina	L	Inactive	
260	**Kappa Upsilon**	January 27, 1953	East Carolina University	Greenville, North Carolina	L	Active	
261	**Kappa Phi**	March 8, 1953	Saint Lawrence University	Canton, New York	Q	Active	
262	**Kappa Chi**	January 17, 1953 – 19xx ?; November 21, 1992	Creighton University	Omaha, Nebraska	C	Active	
263	Kappa Psi	February 13, 1953 – July 13, 1996; April 30, 2000 – January 26, 2019	North Carolina A&T State University	Greensboro, North Carolina	L	Inactive	
264	Kappa Omega	February 26, 1953 – 1960	Cooper Union	New York City, New York	P	Inactive	
265	**Lambda Alpha**	May 8, 1953 – 19xx ?; April 25, 1993	East Tennessee State University	Johnson City, Tennessee	I	Active	
266	Lambda Beta	May 16, 1953 – 1956	Houghton College	Houghton, New York	Q	Inactive	
267	Lambda Gamma	May 16, 1953 – 1982	Manhattan College	Bronx, New York	P	Inactive	
268	**Lambda Delta**	May 22, 1953 – July 14, 1990; April 6, 2008	New Jersey Institute of Technology	Newark, New Jersey	P	Active	
269	Lambda Epsilon	May 24, 1953 – 1975	St. Cloud State University	St. Cloud, Minnesota	E	Inactive	
270	Lambda Zeta	February 7, 1954 – 1968	Ripon College	Ripon, Wisconsin	E	Petitioning Group	
271	Lambda Eta	April 4, 1954 – 1976	Lehman College	Bronx, New York	P	Inactive	
272	Lambda Theta	May 15, 1954 – 1966	Columbia College, Columbia University	New York City, New York	P	Inactive	
273	Lambda Iota	May 16, 1954 – 1972	New Mexico State University	University Park, New Mexico	B	Inactive	
274	Lambda Kappa	May 16, 1954 – June 24, 2011	Loras College	Dubuque, Iowa	E	Inactive	
275	**Lambda Lambda**	May 16, 1954 – February 7, 2004; September 8, 2012	Shippensburg University of Pennsylvania	Shippensburg, Pennsylvania	O	Active	
276	**Lambda Mu**	May 30, 1954 – 19xx?; 2001 – November 18, 2021	California State University, Los Angeles	Alhambra, California	B	Active	(Note: In 2021, the national fraternity closed the chapter after an investigation into allegations of hazing.)
277	**Lambda Nu**	May 15, 1955	Duke University	Durham, North Carolina	L	Active	
278	Lambda Xi	May 17, 1955 – 1988	University of Texas–Pan American	Edinburg, Texas	D	Inactive	
279	**Lambda Omicron**	May 19, 1955	West Virginia University	Morgantown, West Virginia	O	Active	
280	Lambda Pi	May 18, 1955 – 1966	La Salle University	Philadelphia, Pennsylvania	P	Inactive	
281	**Lambda Rho**	November 6, 1955	Augustana College	Rock Island, Illinois	F	Active	
282	Lambda Sigma	February 19, 1956 – 19xx ?; 1962 – July 19, 1986	University of Wisconsin–Stevens Point	Stevens Point, Wisconsin	E	Inactive	
283	Lambda Tau	March 13, 1956 – 201x ?	Salem International University	Salem, West Virginia	M	Inactive	
284	Lambda Upsilon	May 17, 1956 – July 19, 1997	Ursinus College	Collegeville, Pennsylvania	P	Inactive	(Note: The national fraternity suspended the chapter for violations of membership and risk management policies.)
285	**Lambda Phi**	May 20, 1956	Eastern Michigan University	Ypsilanti, Michigan	G	Active	
286	Lambda Chi	May 20, 1956 – 1977	University of Memphis	Memphis, Tennessee	I	Inactive	
287	Lambda Psi	May 13, 1956 – 1972	University of Northern Colorado	Greeley, Colorado	C	Inactive	
288	Lambda Omega	May 19, 1956 – 1968; May 15, 1977	California University of Pennsylvania	California, Pennsylvania	O	Inactive	
289	**Mu Alpha**	May 20, 1956	Georgetown University	Washington, D.C.	N	Active	
290	Mu Beta	May 20, 1956 – 1964	Colgate University	Hamilton, New York	Q	Inactive	
291	Mu Gamma	May 20, 1956 – July 10, 1999	Morgan State University	Baltimore, Maryland	N	Petitioning Group	
292	Mu Delta	June 3, 1956 – 1971	University of Great Falls	Great Falls, Montana	A	Inactive	
293	Mu Epsilon	April 15, 1957 – 1977	University of Hawaiʻi at Mānoa	Honolulu, Hawaii	B	Inactive	
294	**Mu Zeta**	November 29, 1956 – c. 1958; April 26, 1985	San Francisco State University	San Francisco, California	A	Active	
295	**Mu Eta**	May 19, 1957	Albright College	Reading, Pennsylvania	O	Active	
296	Mu Theta	May 19, 1957 – 20xx ?	Luther College	Decorah, Iowa	E	Inactive	
297	**Mu Iota**	May 19, 1957 – 1980; April 17, 2016	University of Lynchburg	Lynchburg, Virginia	M	Active	
298	Mu Kappa	May 22, 1957 – 1957	Pratt Institute	Brooklyn, New York	P	Inactive	
299	**Mu Lambda**	February 15, 1958 – 19xx ?; March 21, 1992	University of Rochester	Rochester, New York	Q	Active	
300	**Mu Mu**	February 23, 1958	Oglethorpe University	Brookhaven, Georgia	J	Active	
301	Mu Nu	May 11, 1958 – June 22, 2019	Western Illinois University	Macomb, Illinois	F	Inactive	
302	**Mu Xi**	April 27, 1958	High Point University	High Point, North Carolina	L	Active	
303	**Mu Omicron**	November 12, 1958	Clarkson University	Potsdam, New York	Q	Active	
304	Mu Pi	October 12, 1958 – February 2, 2008; October 3, 2009 – March 1, 2021	Colorado School of Mines	Golden, Colorado	C	Inactive	
305	Mu Rho	May 10, 1959 – 1975	Upper Iowa University	Fayette, Iowa	E	Inactive	
306	Mu Sigma	May 16, 1959 – 1973	South Dakota State University	Brookings, South Dakota	E	Inactive	
307	**Mu Tau**	May 16, 1959	West Virginia University Institute of Technology	Montgomery, West Virginia	M	Active	
308	Mu Upsilon	May 17, 1959 – 20xx ?	Washington & Jefferson College	Washington, Pennsylvania	O	Inactive	
309	Mu Phi	May 17, 1959 – 1990	Fort Hays State University	Hays, Kansas	C	Inactive	
310	Mu Chi	December 6, 1959 – June 24, 2017	Indiana University of Pennsylvania	Indiana, Pennsylvania	O	Inactive	
311	Mu Psi	January 10, 1960 – 1978	Niagara University	Lewiston, New York	Q	Inactive	
312	Mu Omega	January 30, 1960 – 19xx ?; March 19, 1990 – July 16, 1994; April 10, 2005 – July 10, 2010	University of Tampa	Tampa, Florida	K	Inactive	
313	**Nu Alpha**	May 13, 1960 – 1978; May 7, 2000	Quinnipiac University	Hamden, Connecticut	R	Active	
314	Nu Beta	May 17, 1960 – June 22, 2019	Hope College	Holland, Michigan	G	Inactive	
315	Nu Gamma	May 15, 1960 – 1985; November 12, 2005 – October 8, 2022	Texas State University	San Marcos, Texas	D	Inactive	
316	**Nu Delta**	May 22, 1960	Lebanon Valley College	Annville, Pennsylvania	O	Active	
317	**Nu Epsilon**	May 22, 1960	Georgia Southern University	Statesboro, Georgia	J	Active	
318	Nu Zeta	May 24, 1960 – February 2, 2008	Abilene Christian University	Abilene, Texas	D	Inactive	
319	Nu Eta	January 21, 1961 – 1968	California College of Medicine	Los Angeles, California	B	Inactive	
320	**Nu Theta**	April 13, 1961	Rowan University	Glassboro, New Jersey	P	Active	
321	Nu Iota	April 27, 1961 – 1989	Bethune–Cookman University	Daytona Beach, Florida	K	Inactive	
322	Nu Kappa	May 3, 1961 – July 8, 2006	Campbell University	Buies Creek, North Carolina	L	Inactive	
323	Nu Lambda	May 9, 1961 – July 13, 2002	Moravian College	Bethlehem, Pennsylvania	O	Inactive	
324	Nu Mu	May 25, 1961 – June 28, 2013	University of Minnesota Duluth	Duluth, Minnesota	E	Inactive	
325	Nu Nu	May 13, 1961 – June 24, 2011	Eastern New Mexico University	Portales, New Mexico	B	Inactive	
326	Nu Xi	May 19, 1961 – July 14, 2007	Birmingham–Southern College	Birmingham, Alabama	J	Inactive	
327	Nu Omicron	May 25, 1961 – 1991	Troy State University	Troy, Alabama	J	Inactive	
328	Nu Pi	November 3, 1961 – 1975; March 22, 2003 – January 30, 2016	Minnesota State University, Mankato	Mankato, Minnesota	E	Inactive	
329	**Nu Rho**	December 11, 1961 – 1974; 1978	College of William & Mary	Williamsburg, Virginia	M	Active	
330	Nu Sigma	December 15, 1961 – June 24, 2023	Stephen F. Austin State University	Nacogdoches, Texas	D	Inactive	
331	Nu Tau	March 23, 1962 – 1982	California State University, Northridge	Northridge, California	B	Inactive	
332	Nu Upsilon	April 25, 1962 – 1967	Princeton University	Princeton, New Jersey	P	Inactive	
333	Nu Phi	May 20, 1962 – 1970	Chadron State College	Chadron, Nebraska	C	Inactive	
334	Nu Chi	April 26, 1962 – 1991	Davidson College	Davidson, North Carolina	L	Inactive	
335	Nu Psi	May 15, 1962 – July 13, 2002; April 18, 2009 – November 16, 2021	Montclair State University	Montclair, New Jersey	P	Inactive	
336	Nu Omega	May 14, 1962 – 1977; October 21, 2005 – June 23, 2018	University of Alaska Fairbanks	Fairbanks, Alaska	A	Inactive	
337	**Xi Alpha**	May 14, 1962	Muhlenberg College	Allentown, Pennsylvania	O	Active	
338	Xi Beta	May 20, 1962 – January 28, 2012	University of Nebraska at Kearney	Kearney, Nebraska	C	Inactive	
339	Xi Gamma	May 24, 1962 – 1970	Adams State College	Alamosa, Colorado	C	Inactive	
340	**Xi Delta**	May 22, 1962	Texas A&M University	College Station, Texas	D	Active	
341	Xi Epsilon	May 27, 1962 – 1968	University of Wyoming	Laramie, Wyoming	C	Inactive	
342	**Xi Zeta**	January 19, 1963	Rochester Institute of Technology	Rochester, New York	Q	Active	
343	Xi Eta	December 15, 1963 – 1970	Brown University	Providence, Rhode Island	R	Inactive	
344	Xi Theta	February 10, 1963 – July 16, 1994	Ferris State University	Big Rapids, Michigan	G	Inactive	
345	**Xi Iota**	May 5, 1963 – 1968; December 9, 2001	Susquehanna University	Selinsgrove, Pennsylvania	O	Active	
346	Xi Kappa	May 25, 1963 – 1969	Fairleigh Dickinson University	Madison, New Jersey	P	Inactive	
347	**Xi Lambda**	October 26, 1963	Commonwealth University-Bloomsburg	Bloomsburg, Pennsylvania	O	Active	(Note: Chapter formed at Bloomsburg State College, now Commonwealth University-Bloomsburg.)
348	Xi Mu	October 23, 1963 – 1976	Lock Haven State College	Lock Haven, Pennsylvania	O	Inactive	
349	Xi Nu	October 5, 1963 – July 8, 2006	Texas Wesleyan University	Fort Worth, Texas	D	Inactive	
350	Xi Xi	October 3, 1963 – 1972	Fordham University	Bronx, New York	P	Inactive	
351	**Xi Omicron**	October 20, 1963	Tarleton State University	Stephenville, Texas	D	Active	
352	Xi Pi	December 14, 1963 – 1989	Lycoming College	Williamsport, Pennsylvania	O	Inactive	
353	**Xi Rho**	December 14, 1963 – 1973; November 19, 1977	State University of New York at Oneonta	Oneonta, New York	Q	Active	
354	Xi Sigma	December 10, 1963 – February 3, 2007	Carson-Newman College	Jefferson City, Tennessee	I	Inactive	
355	Xi Tau	February 5, 1964 – 1968	Frederick College	Portsmouth, Virginia	M	Inactive	
356	**Xi Upsilon**	April 29, 1964 – 1966; November 22, 1998	University of Mount Union	Alliance, Ohio	H	Active	
357	**Xi Phi**	April 19, 1964 – 1977; September 6, 2015	University of New Haven	West Haven, Connecticut	R	Active	
358	Xi Chi	April 15, 1964 – 1980	Greensboro College	Greensboro, North Carolina	L	Inactive	
359	Xi Psi	May 9, 1964 – July 14, 2000	Western Kentucky University	Bowling Green, Kentucky	I	Inactive	
360	Xi Omega	April 29, 1964 – July 13, 1996; September 29, 1991 – xxxx ?	Murray State University	Murray, Kentucky	I	Inactive	
361	**Omicron Alpha**	May 11, 1964 – 1980; December 10, 1995	Kutztown University of Pennsylvania	Kutztown, Pennsylvania	O	Active	
362	Omicron Beta	May 28, 1964 – 1973	Marietta College	Marietta, Ohio	H	Inactive	
363	Omicron Gamma	May 23, 1964 – 1982	West Virginia State University	Institute, West Virginia	M	Inactive	
364	Omicron Delta	May 23, 1964 – 20xx ?	McMurry University	Abilene, Texas	D	Inactive	
365	Omicron Epsilon	May 24, 1964 – 1976	Union College	Barbourville, Kentucky	I	Inactive	
366	**Omicron Zeta**	June 14, 1964	California State University, East Bay	Hayward, California	A	Active	
367	Omicron Eta	December 5, 1964 – July 13, 2002	Suffolk University	Boston, Massachusetts	R	Inactive	
368	Omicron Theta	November 21, 1964 – February 10, 1996	Monmouth University	West Long Branch, New Jersey	P	Inactive	(Note: Chapter's charter was revoked for violating the fraternity's membership policies.)
369	**Omicron Iota**	December 18, 1964	Worcester Polytechnic Institute	Worcester, Massachusetts	R	Active	
370	Omicron Kappa	February 20, 1965 – 1967	Los Angeles Harbor College	Wilmington, California	B	Inactive	
371	Omicron Lambda	February 24, 1965 – 1989; November 22, 2025	Calumet College of St. Joseph	Whiting, Indiana	F	Active	
372	**Omicron Mu**	February 24, 1965 – 1977; April 13, 2019	Carthage College	Kenosha, Wisconsin	E	Active	
373	Omicron Nu	March 28, 1965 – 1982; May 2, 1998 – June 19, 2021	University of Puerto Rico, Río Piedras Campus	San Juan, Puerto Rico	K	Inactive	
374	Omicron Xi	April 18, 1965 – 1975	Denison University	Granville, Ohio	H	Inactive	
375	Omicron Omicron	March 20, 1965 – 1976	Pfeiffer University	Misenheimer, North Carolina	L	Inactive	
376	Omicron Pi	March 28, 1965 – 1968	Fairleigh Dickinson University, Teaneck Campus	Teaneck, New Jersey	P	Inactive	
377	Omicron Rho	April 17, 1965 – 1970	North Carolina Wesleyan College	Rocky Mount, North Carolina	L	Inactive	
378	Omicron Sigma	May 16, 1965 – 1988; March 9, 1996 – July 12, 2003	Saint Peter's College	Jersey City, New Jersey	P	Inactive	
379	**Omicron Tau**	May 16, 1965 – 1973; October 13, 2002	Alma College	Alma, Michigan	G	Active	
380	Omicron Upsilon	May 16, 1965 – 20xx ?	West Chester University	West Chester, Pennsylvania	P	Inactive	
381	**Omicron Phi**	May 21, 1965 – 19xx ?; September 22, 1990	University of Richmond	Richmond, Virginia	M	Active	
382	Omicron Chi	October 31, 1965 – 1975	Walker State Technical College	Jasper, Alabama	J	Inactive	
383	Omicron Psi	October 23, 1965 – 1984	Fitchburg State College	Fitchburg, Massachusetts	R	Inactive	
384	Omicron Omega	October 16, 1965 – 1988	East Texas Baptist University	Marshall, Texas	D	Inactive	
385	Pi Alpha	November 14, 1965 – February 9, 1991	Philander Smith College	Little Rock, Arkansas	D	Inactive	
386	Pi Beta	November 10, 1965 – February 7, 2009	University of Dubuque	Dubuque, Iowa	E	Inactive	
387	Pi Gamma	November 10, 1965 – 1978	Baldwin-Wallace College	Berea, Ohio	H	Inactive	
388	Pi Delta	November 10, 1965 – 1985; December 9, 2006 – June 28, 2013; April 2020	Western Carolina University	Cullowhee, North Carolina	L	Inactive	
389	**Pi Epsilon**	November 14, 1965 – July 14, 1990; March 22, 2013	Alabama A&M University	Normal, Alabama	J	Active	
390	Pi Zeta	December 19, 1965 – 2024	Tuskegee University	Tuskegee, Alabama	J	Inactive	(Note: The national fraternity closed the chapter for violating risk management policies.)
391	**Pi Eta**	January 1, 1966 – 198x ?; April 28, 2001	Loyola University Chicago	Chicago, Illinois	F	Active	
392	Pi Theta	February 12, 1966 – 1968	Otero Junior College	La Junta, Colorado	C	Inactive	
393	**Pi Iota**	February 12, 1966	Wofford College	Spartanburg, South Carolina	L	Active	
394	Pi Kappa	March 12, 1966 – 1982	Pace University	New York City, New York	P	Inactive	
395	Pi Lambda	March 27, 1966 – 1975	University of Wisconsin–Green Bay	Green Bay, Wisconsin	E	Inactive	
396	Pi Mu	March 27, 1966 –1981	University of Mobile	Mobile, Alabama	J	Inactive	
397	Pi Nu	May 1, 1966 – 1970	Guilford College	Greensboro, North Carolina	L	Inactive	
398	Pi Xi	May 1, 1966 – 1981	Lincoln Memorial University	Harrogate, Tennessee	I	Inactive	
399	Pi Omicron	May 1, 1966 – June 19, 2021	Emory and Henry College	Emory, Virginia	M	Inactive	
400	Pi Pi	May 8, 1966 – 1979	University of the Ozarks	Clarksville, Arkansas	C	Inactive	
401	**Pi Rho**	May 15, 1966	Rider University	Lawrenceville, New Jersey	P	Active	
402	Pi Sigma	May 8, 1966 – 1987	College of San Mateo	San Mateo, California	A	Inactive	
403	Pi Tau	May 14, 1966 – July 17, 1993	Saint Peter's University (Evenings)	Jersey City, New Jersey	P	Inactive	
404	**Pi Upsilon**	May 13, 1966 – 1976; May 10, 1995	Drew University	Madison, New Jersey	P	Active	
405	Pi Phi	May 17, 1966 – 1977	Union County College	Cranford, New Jersey	P	Inactive	
406	Pi Chi	May 15, 1966 –February 7, 2009	Duquesne University	Pittsburgh, Pennsylvania	O	Inactive	
407	Pi Psi	May 22, 1966 – 1969	Winona State University	Winona, Minnesota	E	Inactive	
408	**Pi Omega**	May 22, 1966 – 1984; September 9, 2012	Kentucky State University	Frankfort, Kentucky	I	Active	
409	Rho Alpha	May 16, 1966 – 1986	Paul Smith's College	Paul Smiths, New York	Q	Inactive	
410	Rho Beta	May 22, 1966 – 1970; August 28, 2004 – July 14, 2007; August 24, 2014 – January 26, 2018	Armstrong State University	Savannah, Georgia	J	Inactive	
411	**Rho Gamma**	June 15, 1966 – 1971; 1982	California State University, Long Beach	Long Beach, California	B	Active	
412	Rho Delta	June 5, 1966 – 1970; April 30, 2016 – September 23, 2021 – October 13, 2021	University of Rhode Island	Kingston, Rhode Island	R	Inactive	
413	Rho Epsilon	June 22, 1966 – July 11, 1998	Savannah State University	Savannah, Georgia	J	Inactive	
414	Rho Zeta	June 12, 1966 – 1973	Hiwassee College	Madisonville, Tennessee	I	Inactive	
415	Rho Eta	July 10, 1966 – 1976	Grayson County College	Denison, Texas	D	Inactive	
416	Rho Theta	July 3, 1966 – 20xx ?	Capital University	Columbus, Ohio	H	Inactive	
417	Rho Iota	July 10, 1966 – 1973	Augusta State University	Augusta, Georgia	J	Inactive	
418	Rho Kappa	December 3, 1966 – 1978	Milligan College	Milligan College, Tennessee	I	Inactive	
419	Rho Lambda	December 3, 1966 – 19xx ?; November 24, 1991 – 20xx ?	St. Edward's University	Austin, Texas	D	Inactive	
420	Rho Mu	January 16, 1967 – July 14, 2001	Belmont Abbey College	Belmont, North Carolina	L	Inactive	
421	Rho Nu	February 6, 1967 – 1975	Sierra College	Rocklin, California	A	Inactive	
422	Rho Xi	February 5, 1967 – 1969	Penn Valley Community College	Kansas City, Missouri	C	Inactive	
423	Rho Omicron	January 15, 1967 – 1977	University of Maryland Eastern Shore	Princess Anne, Maryland	N	Inactive	
424	**Rho Pi**	February 5, 1967 – 1972; April 17, 1994	University of California, San Diego	La Jolla, California	B	Active	
425	**Rho Rho**	February 19, 1967 – 1969; April 5, 2002	University of California, Irvine	Irvine, California	B	Active	
426	Rho Sigma	February 19, 1967 – 1973; December 10, 1994 – January 29, 2011	Point Park University	Pittsburgh, Pennsylvania	O	Inactive	
427	Rho Tau	March 19, 1967 – 1969	Imperial Valley College	Imperial, California	B	Inactive	
428	Rho Upsilon	March 26, 1967 – 1968	University of the Cumberlands	Williamsburg, Kentucky	I	Inactive	
429	Rho Phi	April 16, 1967 – 1968	Dominican College of Racine	Racine, Wisconsin	E	Inactive	
430	Rho Chi	April 16, 1967 – January 26, 2019	Gannon University	Erie, Pennsylvania	O	Inactive	
431	Rho Psi	April 8, 1967 – 1967	Chabot College	Hayward, California	A	Inactive	
432	Rho Omega	May 6, 1967 – 1971	San Bernardino Valley College	San Bernardino, California	B	Inactive	
433	**Sigma Alpha**	April 16, 1967 – 1984; April 21, 2002	University of Missouri–St. Louis	St. Louis, Missouri	C	Active	
434	**Sigma Beta**	April 9, 1967 – 1970; September 13, 2008	University of Redlands	Redlands, California	B	Active	
435	Sigma Gamma	May 5, 1967 – 1978	San Antonio College	San Antonio, Texas	D	Inactive	
436	Sigma Delta	April 2, 1967 – 1972	Oakland Community College, Auburn Hills Campus	Auburn Hills, Michigan	G	Inactive	
437	Sigma Epsilon	April 23, 1967 – 1973	Dallas College El Centro	Dallas, Texas	D	Inactive	
438	Sigma Zeta	May 7, 1967 – July 16, 1994	Mars Hill College	Mars Hill, North Carolina	L	Inactive	
439	**Sigma Eta**	April 23, 1967	Villanova University	Villanova, Pennsylvania	P	Active	
440	Sigma Theta	April 30, 1967 – July 14, 2000	Saint Mary's University of Minnesota	Winona, Minnesota	E		
441	**Sigma Iota**	April 30, 1967 – 1969; December 5, 2004	Valdosta State University	Valdosta, Georgia	J	Active	
442	Sigma Kappa	April 30, 1967 – 1982	Eastern University	St. David's, Pennsylvania	P	Inactive	
443	Sigma Lambda	May 7, 1967 – 1968	Merritt College	Oakland, California	A	Inactive	
444	Sigma Mu	May 7, 1967 – 1969; November 6, 2015 – July 15, 2022	Virginia Union University	Richmond, Virginia	M	Petitioning Group	
445	Sigma Nu	May 26, 1967 – April 1, 2021	Delaware Valley College	Doylestown, Pennsylvania	P	Inactive	
446	Sigma Xi	May 31, 1967 – xxxx ?	University of Maine	Orono, Maine	R	Inactive	
447	Sigma Omicron	June 5, 1967 – 1985	Howard Payne University	Brownwood, Texas	D	Inactive	
448	Sigma Pi	June 5, 1967 – June 24, 2011	Prairie View A&M University	Prairie View, Texas	D	Inactive	
449	**Sigma Rho**	June 10, 1967 – February 8, 1992; December 12, 1998	Elon University	Elon, North Carolina	L	Active	
450	**Sigma Sigma**	June 14, 1967 – 19xx ?; April 11, 1992	University of Illinois at Chicago	Chicago, Illinois	F	Active	
451	Sigma Tau	June 6, 1967 – 1985	Chapman University	Orange, California	B	Inactive	
452	Sigma Upsilon	June 14, 1967 – 19xx ?; 1980 – June 23, 2018	University of North Carolina at Charlotte	Charlotte, North Carolina	L	Inactive	
453	Sigma Phi	June 19, 1967 – 1987	University of Notre Dame	Notre Dame, Indiana	F	Inactive	
454	Sigma Chi	June 24, 1967 – February 13, 1993	Miami-Dade Community College	Miami, Florida	K	Inactive	(Note: The national fraternity suspended the chapter for hazing.)
455	Sigma Psi	June 26, 1967 – 1976	Tusculum College	Greeneville, Tennessee	I	Inactive	
456	Sigma Omega	May 27, 1967 – July 14, 1990	Lincoln University	Lincoln University, Pennsylvania	P	Inactive	
457	Tau Alpha	June 4, 1967 – January 30, 2016	Davis & Elkins College	Elkins, West Virginia	M	Inactive	
458	**Tau Beta**	October 21, 1967 – June 25, 2016	Appalachian State University	Boone, North Carolina	L	Active	
459	Tau Gamma	October 29, 1967 – 1984	Southern University at New Orleans	New Orleans, Louisiana	J	Inactive	
460	Tau Delta	June 2, 1967 – 1988	North Carolina Central University	Durham, North Carolina	L	Inactive	
461	Tau Epsilon	December 17, 1967 – July 8, 2006	Tennessee Tech	Cookeville, Tennessee	I	Inactive	
462	Tau Zeta	January 27, 1968 – July 10, 2010	Texas Southern University	Houston, Texas	D	Inactive	
463	Tau Eta	January 27, 1968 – July 1992	State University of New York at Cobleskill	Cobleskill, New York	Q	Inactive	
464	Tau Theta	January 27, 1968 – 1982	Wayland Baptist University	Plainview, Texas	D	Inactive	
465	Tau Iota	January 27, 1968 – 1978	Louisiana College	Pineville, Louisiana	J	Inactive	
466	Tau Kappa	February 17, 1968 – 1971	Lansing Community College	Lansing, Michigan	G	Inactive	
467	**Tau Lambda**	April 14, 1968	Rose–Hulman Institute of Technology	Terre Haute, Indiana	H	Active	
468	Tau Mu	April 5, 1968 – February 8, 1992; March 27, 2004 – 20xx ?	University of South Florida	Tampa, Florida	K	Inactive	
469	Tau Nu	April 5, 1968 – 1973	Humboldt State University	Arcata, California	A	Inactive	
470	Tau Xi	April 28, 1968 – 1969	Westminster College	Salt Lake City, Utah	B	Inactive	
471	Tau Omicron	April 28, 1968 – xxxx ?	Indiana University–Purdue University Indianapolis	Indianapolis, Indiana	H	Inactive	
472	Tau Pi	April 28, 1968 – 1973	Delaware State University	Dover, Delaware	P	Inactive	
473	Tau Rho	April 28, 1968 – 1983	Del Mar College	Corpus Christi, Texas	D	Inactive	
474	Tau Sigma	May 18, 1968 – 1982	Brandywine College	Wilmington, Delaware	P	Inactive	
475	Tau Tau	May 18, 1968 – 1972	Wilmington College	Wilmington, Ohio	H	Inactive	
476	Tau Upsilon	October 12, 1968 – July 16, 1994; February 19, 2005 – June 23, 2018	University of Wisconsin–Platteville	Platteville, Wisconsin	E	Inactive	
477	Tau Phi	March 15, 1969 – 1982	Wingate University	Wingate, North Carolina	L	Inactive	
478	**Tau Chi**	May 3, 1969 – 1988; June 26, 2010	Winston-Salem State University	Winston-Salem, North Carolina	L	Active	
479	Tau Psi	November 16, 1968 – 1976	Middlesex County College	Edison, New Jersey	P	Inactive	
480	Tau Omega	December 6, 1968 – 1977	Ocean County College	Toms River, New Jersey	P	Inactive	
481	Upsilon Alpha	December 15, 1968 – 1977; April 30, 1994 – July 17, 2004	Austin Peay State University	Clarksville, Tennessee	I	Inactive	
482	**Upsilon Beta**	March 1, 1969 – February 5, 2005; April 25, 2010	Saint Francis University	Loretto, Pennsylvania	O	Active	
483	Upsilon Gamma	February 9, 1969 – July 11, 1998	Lake Michigan College	Benton Harbor, Michigan	G	Inactive	
484	Upsilon Delta	February 9, 1969 – 1972	Kean University	Union Township, New Jersey	P	Inactive	
485	Upsilon Epsilon	May 17, 1969 – 1969	Central Oregon Community College	Bend, Oregon	A	Inactive	
486	Upsilon Zeta	February 15, 1969 – 1982	Boston College	Chestnut Hill, Massachusetts	R	Inactive	
487	**Upsilon Eta**	March 2, 1969 – July 1992; April 22, 2010	University of Texas at El Paso	El Paso, Texas	D	Active	
488	Upsilon Theta	March 2, 1969 – 1969	Sonoma State University	Rohnert Park, California	A	Inactive	
489	**Upsilon Iota**	March 2, 1969 – 1976; April 9, 2006	DePaul University	Chicago, Illinois	F	Active	
490	Upsilon Kappa	April 26, 1969 – 1988; November 23, 2008 – June 22, 2012	Saint Augustine's University	Raleigh, North Carolina	L	Inactive	
491	Upsilon Lambda	March 16, 1969 – 1978	Sterling College	Sterling, Kansas	C	Inactive	
492	**Upsilon Mu**	October 4, 1969	University of Puerto Rico at Mayagüez	Mayaguez, Puerto Rico	K	Active	
493	Upsilon Nu	April 26, 1969 – July 14, 2007	University of North Carolina Wilmington	Wilmington, North Carolina	L	Inactive	
494	Upsilon Xi	April 19, 1969 – 1970	Arapahoe Community College	Littleton, Colorado	C	Inactive	
495	Upsilon Omicron	May 3, 1969 – 1969	University of Alabama at Birmingham	Birmingham, Alabama	J	Inactive	
496	Upsilon Pi	May 5, 1969 – 1977	Cameron University	Lawton, Oklahoma	C	Inactive	
497	Upsilon Rho	May 3, 1969 – July 13, 2002	Charleston Southern University	Charleston, South Carolina	L	Inactive	
498	Upsilon Sigma	April 19, 1969 – 1977	Western State College of Colorado	Gunnison, Colorado	C	Inactive	
499	Upsilon Tau	April 26, 1969 – 1985	Shenandoah University	Winchester, Virginia	M	Inactive	
500	Upsilon Upsilon	May 3, 1969 – July 1992	University of St. Thomas	St. Paul, Minnesota	E	Inactive	
501	Upsilon Phi	May 17, 1969 – 1976	Indiana University–Purdue University Fort Wayne	Fort Wayne, Indiana	H	Inactive	
502	Upsilon Chi	May 17, 1969 – July 15, 1995	Clark Atlanta University	Atlanta, Georgia	J	Inactive	
503	**Upsilon Psi**	May 17, 1969 – 1984; October 26, 1997 – July 13, 2002; May 19, 2018	University of Nevada, Reno	Reno, Nevada	A	Active	
504	Upsilon Omega	May 24, 1969 – 1976	Tarrant County College South Campus	Fort Worth, Texas	D	Inactive	
505	Phi Alpha	June 7, 1969 – 1978	Morton College	Cicero, Illinois	F	Inactive	
506	Phi Beta	May 8, 1969 – 19xx ?; May 8, 1993 – July 19, 1997	Spartanburg Methodist College	Spartanburg, South Carolina	L	Inactive	
507	Phi Gamma	May 24, 1969 – July 16, 1994; April 27, 2003 – February 6, 2010	Texas Lutheran University	Seguin, Texas	D	Inactive	
508	**Phi Delta**	May 23, 1969 – July 19, 1997; May 24, 2013	California State Polytechnic University, Pomona	Pomona, California	B	Active	
509	Phi Epsilon	May 9, 1969	Maine Maritime Academy	Castine, Maine	R	Inactive	
510	**Phi Zeta**	June 14, 1969 – February 6, 2010; February 28, 2016	Fort Valley State University	Fort Valley, Georgia	J	Active	
511	Phi Eta	December 7, 1969 – 1972	Ohio State University at Newark	Newark, Ohio	H	Inactive	
512	Phi Theta	November 1, 1969 – 1978; February 27, 1996 – June 23, 2018	Arkansas Tech University	Russellville, Arkansas	C	Inactive	
513	Phi Iota	November 8, 1969 – 1972	Dallas Baptist University	Dallas, Texas	D	Inactive	
514	Phi Kappa	December 13, 1969 – June 23, 2018	University of North Carolina at Greensboro	Greensboro, North Carolina	L	Inactive	
515	Phi Lambda	December 14, 1969 – 1981	Northern Virginia Community College	Annandale, Virginia	N	Inactive	
516	**Phi Mu**	January 10, 1970 – February 8, 1992; April 11, 2008	Norfolk State University	Norfolk, Virginia	M	Active	
517	Phi Nu	January 3, 1970 – 1977	Midland Lutheran College	Fremont, Nebraska	C	Inactive	
518	**Phi Xi**	February 8, 1970	Austin College	Sherman, Texas	D	Active	
519	Phi Omicron	December 7, 2001 – June 25, 2016	Ferrum College	Ferrum, Virginia	M	Inactive	(Note: The chapter's chartering in 1970 fell apart after the letters had been assigned. It was not chartered for nearly thirty years.)
520	Phi Pi	April 11, 1970 – July 19, 1986	Langston University	Langston, Oklahoma	C	Inactive	
521	Phi Rho	April 17, 1970 – 1985	Westminster Choir College	Princeton, New Jersey	P	Inactive	
522	**Phi Sigma**	April 5, 1970 – 1984; November 13, 2010	Pontifical Catholic University of Puerto Rico	Ponce, Puerto Rico	K	Active	
523	Phi Tau	April 3, 1970 – February 9, 1991	Fayetteville State University	Fayetteville, North Carolina	L	Inactive	
524	Phi Upsilon	April 25, 1970 – August 31, 1985	Amarillo College	Amarillo, Texas	D	Inactive	
525	Phi Phi	April 26, 1970 – 1994	Florida Memorial University	Miami, Florida	K	Inactive	
526	Phi Chi	April 25, 1970 – 1990	Missouri Western State University	St. Joseph, Missouri	C	Inactive	
527	Phi Psi	May 17, 1970 – 1978	Lehigh Carbon Community College	Schnecksville, Pennsylvania	O	Inactive	
528	Phi Omega	May 9, 1970 – 1975	Herkimer County Community College	Herkimer, New York	Q	Inactive	
529	Chi Alpha	May 15, 1970 – 1976	Mohawk Valley Community College	Utica, New York	Q	Inactive	
530	Chi Beta	June 1, 1970 – 1975	Gloucester County College	Sewell, New Jersey	P	Inactive	
531	**Chi Gamma**	October 10, 1970 – 19xx ?; April 14, 1989	James Madison University	Harrisonburg, Virginia	M	Active	
532	Chi Delta	August 23, 1970 – 1983	Pepperdine University	Malibu, California	B	Inactive	
533	Chi Epsilon	September 26, 1970 – 1982	Richard Bland College	Petersburg, Virginia	M	Inactive	
534	**Chi Zeta**	October 26, 1970 – February 6, 2010; April 15, 2017	University of Tennessee at Martin	Martin, Tennessee	I	Active	
535	Chi Eta	February 14, 1971 – 1977	Tarrant County College-NE Campus	Hurst, Texas	D	Inactive	
536	**Chi Theta**	March 6, 1971 – 1984; February 17, 2018	Columbus State University	Columbus, Georgia	J	Active	
537	Chi Iota	April 7, 1971 – July 16, 1994	Bemidji State University	Bemidji, Minnesota	E	Inactive	
538	Chi Kappa	April 3, 1971 – 1978; November 17, 1996 – February 6, 2010	University of North Carolina at Asheville	Asheville, North Carolina	L	Inactive	
539	Chi Lambda	April 17, 1971 – July 11, 1987; March 1, 2009 – July 15, 2022	Elizabeth City State University	Elizabeth City, North Carolina	M	Inactive	
540	Chi Mu	April 25, 1971 – July 15, 1995	Henry Ford Community College	Dearborn, Michigan	G	Inactive	
541	**Chi Nu**	May 15, 1971	Grambling State University	Grambling, Louisiana	J	Active	
542	Chi Xi	April 29, 1971 – 1973	Central Texas College	Killeen, Texas	D	Inactive	
543	Chi Omicron	May 8, 1971 – 1972	Connors State College	Warner, Oklahoma	C	Inactive	
544	**Chi Pi**	May 15, 1971 – 1972; May 2, 1987 – July 15, 2022	State University of New York at Fredonia	Fredonia, New York	Q	Active	
545	Chi Rho	May 15, 1971 – 1972	Kemper Military School & College	Boonville, Missouri	C	Inactive	
546	**Chi Sigma**	May 22, 1971	Allegheny College	Meadville, Pennsylvania	O	Active	
547	Chi Tau	May 8, 1971 – 1973	Lea College	Albert Lea, Minnesota	E	Inactive	
548	Chi Upsilon	May 23, 1971 – 19xx ?; ; November 5, 1988 – February 6, 2010	Dillard University	New Orleans, Louisiana	J	Inactive	
549	Chi Phi	November 13, 1971 – 1973	Oakland Community College, Orchard Ridge Campus	Farmington, Michigan	G	Inactive	
550	Chi Chi	November 20, 1971 – 1978; December 2, 2000 – July 14, 2007	University of Central Arkansas	Conway, Arkansas	C	Inactive	
551	Chi Psi	December 4, 1971 – 1978	Kean University (Evening Division)	Union Township, New Jersey	P	Inactive	
552	Chi Omega	February 12, 1972 – 20xx ?	McKendree University	Lebanon, Illinois	C	Inactive	
553	Psi Alpha	February 26, 1972 – 1980	Berry College	Mount Berry, Georgia	J	Inactive	
554	Psi Beta	February 19, 1972 – 1975	Illinois Central College	East Peoria, Illinois	F	Inactive	
555	Psi Gamma	April 29, 1972 – February 16, 2002	Wentworth Military Academy and College	Lexington, Missouri	C	Inactive	
556	Psi Delta	May 14, 1972 – February 6, 2010	University of Maine at Machias	Machias, Maine	R	Inactive	
557	Psi Epsilon	June 2, 1972 – February 8, 1992	Delgado Community College	New Orleans, Louisiana	J	Inactive	
558	Psi Zeta	October 29, 1972 – 1985	Bishop College	Marshall, Texas	D	Inactive	
559	**Psi Eta**	November 17, 1972 – 1985; December 15, 2013	Interamerican University of Puerto Rico	San Germán, Puerto Rico	K	Active	
560	Psi Theta	December 16, 1972 – 1975	Moorhead State University	Moorhead, Minnesota	E	Inactive	
561	Psi Iota	December 16, 1972 – 1973	Blinn College	Brenham, Texas	D	Inactive	
562	Psi Kappa	March 3, 1973 – 1983	Chattanooga State Community College	Chattanooga, Tennessee	I	Inactive	
563	Psi Lambda	March 13, 1973 – February 6, 1999	Rust College	Holly Springs, Mississippi	J	Inactive	
564	Psi Mu	April 28, 1973 – July 13, 2002	University of Mary Hardin–Baylor	Belton, Texas	D	Inactive	
565	Psi Nu	October 5, 1973 – July 16, 1994; May 7, 2011 – July 15, 2022	Benedict College	Columbia, South Carolina	L	Petitioning Group	
566	Psi Xi	November 11, 1973 – 1985	Alabama State University	Montgomery, Alabama	J	Inactive	
567	Psi Omicron	January 11, 1974 – 1989	Morehouse College	Atlanta, Georgia	J	Inactive	
568	Psi Pi	March 16, 1974 – 1982	Penn State Hazleton	Hazleton, Pennsylvania	O	Inactive	
569	Psi Rho	March 9, 1974 – 1977	University of North Florida	Jacksonville, Florida	K	Inactive	
570	**Psi Sigma**	May 4, 1974 – 1987; February 16, 2014	Albany State University	Albany, Georgia	J	Active	
571	Psi Tau	April 27, 1974 – July 11, 1987	Virginia State University	Petersburg, Virginia	M	Inactive	
572	Psi Upsilon	December 14, 1974 – July 14, 1990	Southwestern Oklahoma State University	Weatherford, Oklahoma	C	Inactive	
573	**Psi Phi**	May 3, 1975 – 1984; October 20, 2001	Tennessee State University	Nashville, Tennessee	I	Active	
574	Psi Chi	May 18, 1975 – 1982	University of South Alabama	Mobile, Alabama	J	Inactive	
575	Psi Psi	July 5, 1975 – July 1992	University of Arkansas at Pine Bluff	Pine Bluff, Arkansas	D	Inactive	
576	**Psi Omega**	November 22, 1975 – 19x ?; 1982	University of Central Florida	Orlando, Florida	K	Active	
577	Omega Alpha	December 5, 1975 – 1979	Tarkio College	Tarkio, Missouri	C	Inactive	
578	Omega Beta	May 2, 1976 – 1979	Augsburg University	Minneapolis, Minnesota	E	Inactive	
579	Omega Gamma	May 2, 1976 – April 30, 2022	Angelo State University	San Angelo, Texas	D	Inactive	
580	Omega Delta	April 30, 1976 – 1982	Fairfield University	Fairfield, Connecticut	R	Inactive	
581	**Omega Epsilon**	April 30, 1976	Illinois Wesleyan University	Bloomington, Illinois	F	Active	
582	Omega Zeta	May 21, 1976 – 1981	Durham College	Durham, North Carolina	L	Inactive	(Note: The college closed in 1980.)
583	Omega Eta	October 8, 1976 – July 19, 1986	Loyola University	New Orleans, Louisiana	J	Inactive	
584	Omega Theta	November 13, 1976 – 1988	Lon Morris College	Jacksonville, Texas	D	Inactive	
585	Omega Iota	April 2, 1977 – 1979	Marian University	Indianapolis, Indiana	H	Inactive	
586	Omega Kappa	April 15, 1977 – 1988	Coastal Carolina University	Conway, South Carolina	L	Inactive	
587	Omega Lambda	April 16, 1977 – 1981; September 6, 2004 – January 26, 2018	Fisk University	Nashville, Tennessee	I	Inactive	
588	Omega Mu	May 5, 1977 – June 27, 2020	Clarion University of Pennsylvania	Clarion, Pennsylvania	O	Inactive	
589	Omega Nu	September 17, 1977 – 1983	Southern New Hampshire University	Manchester, New Hampshire	R	Inactive	
590	Omega Xi	December 3, 1977 – February 7, 2004	Cornell College	Mount Vernon, Iowa	E	Inactive	
591	Omega Omicron	November 13, 1977 – 1989	Concordia College	Moorhead, Minnesota	E	Inactive	
592	Omega Pi	April 29, 1978 – 1987	Arkansas State University	Jonesboro, Arkansas	C	Inactive	
593	**Omega Rho**	February 25, 1978 – 1982; March 16, 2008	Interamerican University of Puerto Rico, Metropolitan Campus	San Juan, Puerto Rico	K	Active	
594	**Omega Sigma**	October 21, 1978 – 1983; April 18, 2009	California State University, Fullerton	Fullerton, California	B	Active	
595	Omega Tau	December 2, 1978 – 1982	Beloit College	Beloit, Wisconsin	E	Inactive	
596	**Omega Upsilon**	December 8, 1978 – 1982; April 12, 2026	Florida International University	Miami, Florida	K	Active	
597	Omega Phi	December 9, 1978 – 1984	Tougaloo College	Tougaloo, Mississippi	J	Inactive	
598	**Omega Chi**	March 31, 1979 – July 10, 1999; April 19, 2025	Jacksonville State University	Jacksonville, Alabama	J	Active	
599	**Omega Psi**	March 31, 1979 – 1992; March 31, 2023	Jackson State University	Jackson, Mississippi	J	Inactive	
600	Omega Omega	April 28, 1979 – July 11, 1987	Gallaudet University	Washington, D.C.	N	Inactive	
601	Alpha Alpha Alpha	April 29, 1979 – 1984	Maryville College of the Sacred Heart	St. Louis, Missouri	C	Inactive	
602	Alpha Alpha Beta	December 15, 1979 – July 1992	C.W. Post Campus of Long Island University	Greenvale, New York	P	Inactive	
603	Alpha Alpha Gamma	February 2, 1980 – 1982	Weber State University	Ogden, Utah	B	Inactive	
604	**Alpha Alpha Delta**	April 27, 1980 – July 19, 1986; December 6, 2008	Salisbury University	Salisbury, Maryland	N	Active	
605	Alpha Alpha Epsilon	April 26, 1980 – January 24, 2015	College of Charleston	Charleston, South Carolina	L	Inactive	
607	Alpha Alpha Eta	April 27, 1980 – February 9, 1991; xxxx ? – June 23, 2011	MacMurray College	Jacksonville, Illinois	F	Inactive	
608	Alpha Alpha Theta	May 3, 1980 – February 9, 1991; October 8, 1994 – June 24, 2011	Saint Ambrose University	Davenport, Iowa	E	Inactive	
609	Alpha Alpha Iota	April 26, 1980 – February 5, 2005	Barber–Scotia College	Concord, North Carolina	L	Inactive	
610	Alpha Alpha Kappa	October 16, 1980 – July 19, 1986	Snow College	Ephraim, Utah	B	Inactive	
611	Alpha Alpha Lambda	May 24, 1980 – February 18, 1995	Alcorn State University	Lorman, Mississippi	J	Inactive	
612	Alpha Alpha Mu	October 18, 1980 – 1988	University of Scranton	Scranton, Pennsylvania	O	Inactive	
613	Alpha Alpha Nu	May 3, 1981 – 1983	Palm Beach Junior College	Lake Worth, Florida	K	Inactive	
614	**Alpha Alpha Xi**	February 28, 1981	University of the Pacific	Stockton, California	A	Active	
615	**Alpha Alpha Omicron**	March 28, 1981	Longwood University	Farmville, Virginia	M	Active	
616	Alpha Alpha Pi	April 26, 1981 – xxxx ?	Westminster College	New Wilmington, Pennsylvania	O	Inactive	
617	**Alpha Alpha Rho**	May 9, 1981	University of the Incarnate Word	San Antonio, Texas	D	Active	
618	Alpha Alpha Sigma	September 19, 1980 – July 19, 1997	University of Louisiana at Monroe	Monroe, Louisiana	J	Inactive	
619	Alpha Alpha Tau	May 16, 1981 – July 16, 1994; 19xx ? – July 19, 1997	Tallahassee Community College	Tallahassee, Florida	K	Inactive	
620	Alpha Alpha Upsilon	June 25, 1981 – July 16, 1994	Mount St. Mary's University	Emmitsburg, Maryland	N	Inactive	
621	Alpha Alpha Phi	November 13, 1981 – July 11, 1987	Columbia College	Columbia, Missouri	C	Inactive	
622	Alpha Alpha Chi	February 19, 1982 –July 17, 1993; April 21, 2017 – July 15, 2022	Fairmont State University	Fairmont, West Virginia	O	Inactive	
623	Alpha Alpha Psi	May 1, 1982 – 1990; December 11, 1994 – July 9, 2005; April 21, 2017 – 20xx ?	Eastfield College	Mesquite, Texas	D	Inactive	
624	Alpha Alpha Omega	May 2, 1982 – July 11, 1998	Middle Tennessee State University	Murfreesboro, Tennessee	I	Inactive	
625	Alpha Beta Alpha	May 15, 1983 – 1987	Indiana University Southeast	New Albany, Indiana	H	Inactive	
626	**Alpha Beta Beta**	December 10, 1983 – 1991	Saint Bonaventure University	Olean, New York	Q	Active	
627	**Alpha Beta Gamma**	March 4, 1984	Knox College	Galesburg, Illinois	F	Active	
628	**Alpha Beta Delta**	March 31, 1984	Widener University	Chester, Pennsylvania	P	Active	
629	Alpha Beta Epsilon	April 7, 1984 – 1987	University of Arkansas at Monticello	Monticello, Arkansas	D	Inactive	
630	**Alpha Beta Zeta**	March 31, 1984	Radford University	Radford, Virginia	M	Active	
631	Alpha Beta Eta	May 5, 1984 – 1990	College of the Southwest	Hobbs, New Mexico	B	Inactive	
632	Alpha Beta Theta	April 28, 1985 – July 16, 1994	Morris College	Sumter, South Carolina	L	Inactive	
633	Alpha Beta Iota	October 27, 1985 – 1990	Saint Joseph's College	Rensselaer, Indiana	F	Inactive	
634	Alpha Beta Kappa	March 8, 1986 – July 1991; June 7, 2003 – February 6, 2010	University of New Orleans	New Orleans, Louisiana	J	Inactive	
635	Alpha Beta Lambda	October 12, 1985 – July 12, 2003	Wright State University	Dayton, Ohio	H	Inactive	
636	Alpha Beta Mu	April 27, 1986 – June 22, 2019	Grove City College	Grove City, Pennsylvania	O	Inactive	
637	**Alpha Beta Nu**	September 20, 1986 – January 28, 2012; August 27, 2017	Penn State Erie, The Behrend College	Erie, Pennsylvania	O	Active	
638	**Alpha Beta Xi**	December 6, 1986	State University of New York at Geneseo	Geneseo, New York	Q	Active	
639	**Alpha Beta Omicron**	December 21, 1986 – February 9, 1991; April 24, 2004	Elmhurst University	Elmhurst, Illinois	F	Active	
640	Alpha Beta Pi	February 21, 1987 – 1989	Lenoir–Rhyne College	Hickory, North Carolina	L	Inactive	
641	Alpha Beta Rho	March 28, 1987 – 20xx ?	University of Pittsburgh at Bradford	Bradford, Pennsylvania	Q	Inactive	
642	Alpha Beta Sigma	April 12, 1987 – January 26, 2018	Robert Morris University	Moon Township, Pennsylvania	O	Inactive	
643	**Alpha Beta Tau**	June 1, 1987 – July 12, 2008; September 27, 2015	Washington and Lee University	Lexington, Virginia	M	Active	
644	Alpha Beta Upsilon	August 14, 1987 – July 17, 1993	Broward Community College	Davie, Florida	K	Inactive	
645	Alpha Beta Phi	September 13, 1987 – July 16, 1994	Concordia University	Austin, Texas	D	Inactive	
646	Alpha Beta Chi	December 29, 1987 – July 14, 2007	State University of New York at Plattsburgh	Plattsburgh, New York	Q	Inactive	
647	**Alpha Beta Psi**	September 9, 1988	Roanoke College	Salem, Virginia	M	Active	
648	**Alpha Beta Omega**	December 3, 1988	Old Dominion University	Norfolk, Virginia	M	Active	
649	**Alpha Gamma Alpha**	April 30, 1989	Dickinson College	Carlisle, Pennsylvania	O	Active	
650	Alpha Gamma Beta	April 15, 1989 – February 8, 1997	Clark University	Worcester, Massachusetts	R	Inactive	
651	Alpha Gamma Gamma	May 13, 1989 – June 24, 2017	Hunter College	New York City, New York	P	Inactive	
652	**Alpha Gamma Delta**	January 27, 1990 – June 28, 2013; November 21, 2015	State University of New York at New Paltz	New Paltz, New York	Q	Active	
653	Alpha Gamma Epsilon	March 10, 1990 – July 15, 1995	DeVry Institute of Technology	Decatur, Georgia	J	Inactive	
654	Alpha Gamma Zeta	March 24, 1990 – June 24, 2011	Houston Baptist University	Houston, Texas	D	Inactive	
655	**Alpha Gamma Eta**	April 28, 1990	University of Vermont	Burlington, Vermont	R	Active	
656	Alpha Gamma Theta	March 30, 1990 – February 5, 2005	Columbus State Community College	Columbus, Ohio	H	Inactive	
657	**Alpha Gamma Iota**	March 24, 1991	University of the Sciences	Philadelphia, Pennsylvania	P	Active	
658	**Alpha Gamma Kappa**	March 3, 1991	Southwestern University	Georgetown, Texas	D	Active	
659	**Alpha Gamma Lambda**	April 14, 1991	Albion College	Albion, Michigan	G	Active	
660	Alpha Gamma Mu	June 1, 1991 – c. 2013	William Paterson University	Wayne, New Jersey	P	Inactive	
661	**Alpha Gamma Nu**	May 31, 1991 – February 5, 2000; December 5, 2009	University of California, Santa Cruz	Santa Cruz, California	A	Active	
662	**Alpha Gamma Xi**	December 18, 1991	University of Dayton	Dayton, Ohio	H	Inactive	
663	Alpha Gamma Omicron	September 14, 1991 – 20xx ?	Heidelberg University	Tiffin, Ohio	H	Inactive	
664	Alpha Gamma Pi	September 14, 1991 – 20xx ?	University of Maine at Farmington	Farmington, Maine	R	Active	
665	Alpha Gamma Rho	February 22, 1992 – July 15, 2022	Florida Institute of Technology	Melbourne, Florida	K	Inactive	
666	Alpha Gamma Sigma	June 7, 1992 – April 30, 2022	New Jersey City University	Jersey City, New Jersey	P	Inactive	
667	Alpha Gamma Tau	November 22, 1992 – July 11, 1998 – 20xx ?	Stephens College	Columbia, Missouri	C	Inactive	
668	Alpha Gamma Upsilon	December 6, 1992 – 20xx ?	Carlow University	Pittsburgh, Pennsylvania	O	Inactive	
669	**Alpha Gamma Phi**	December 10, 1992	Northern Kentucky University	Highland Heights, Kentucky	H	Active	
670	**Alpha Gamma Chi**	March 28, 1993	Frostburg State University	Frostburg, Maryland	N	Active	
671	Alpha Gamma Psi	March 13, 1993 – July 13, 2002	Mercyhurst College	Erie, Pennsylvania	O	Inactive	
672	Alpha Gamma Omega	April 3, 1993 – January 28, 2017	University of Texas at San Antonio	San Antonio, Texas	D	Inactive	
673	Alpha Delta Alpha	April 18, 1993 – July 19, 1997	Rutgers University–Camden	Camden, New Jersey	P	Inactive	
674	Alpha Delta Beta	April 18, 1993 – April 1, 2021	Wesley College	Dover, Delaware	P	Inactive	
675	Alpha Delta Gamma	May 1, 1993 – June 23, 2012	Loyola University Maryland	Baltimore, Maryland	N	Inactive	
676	**Alpha Delta Delta**	May 8, 1993	George Mason University	Fairfax, Virginia	N	Active	
677	Alpha Delta Epsilon	August 22, 1993 – July 15, 1995	Metropolitan Community College	Blue Springs, Missouri	C	Inactive	
678	Alpha Delta Zeta	March 13, 1994 – July 11, 1998	New Mexico State University Carlsbad	Carlsbad, New Mexico	B	Inactive	
679	**Alpha Delta Eta**	March 19, 1994	University at Albany, SUNY	Albany, New York	Q	Active	
680	**Alpha Delta Theta**	May 21, 1994	University of California, Riverside	Riverside, California	B	Active	
681	**Alpha Delta Iota**	November 19, 1994	Virginia Commonwealth University	Richmond, Virginia	M	Active	
682	Alpha Delta Kappa	December 3, 1994 – February 6, 2010	California State University, Fresno	Fresno, California	A	Inactive	
683	**Alpha Delta Lambda**	May 13, 1995 – xxxx ?; February 23, 2019	Florida Atlantic University	Boca Raton, Florida	K	Active	
684	**Alpha Delta Mu**	June 3, 1995	Ramapo College	Mahwah, New Jersey	P	Active	
685	**Alpha Delta Nu**	March 30, 1996	Embry–Riddle Aeronautical University, Daytona Beach	Daytona Beach, Florida	K	Active	
686	**Alpha Delta Xi**	April 14, 1996	Christopher Newport University	Newport News, Virginia	M	Active	
687	Alpha Delta Omicron	May 18, 1996 – January 28, 2017	West Virginia Wesleyan College	Buckhannon, West Virginia	M	Inactive	
688	**Alpha Delta Pi**	September 28, 1996	University of West Alabama	Livingston, Alabama	J	Active	
689	Alpha Delta Rho	December 27, 1996 – July 9, 2005	Northern Arizona University	Flagstaff, Arizona	B	Inactive	
690	**Alpha Delta Sigma**	April 13, 1997 – July 13, 2002; February 25, 2006	Lindenwood University	St. Charles, Missouri	C	Active	
691	**Alpha Delta Tau**	April 26, 1997	Nova Southeastern University	Davie, Florida	K	Active	
692	**Alpha Delta Upsilon**	April 26, 1997	Saginaw Valley State University	University Center, Michigan	G	Active	
693	**Alpha Delta Phi**	May 3, 1997	Seton Hall University	South Orange, New Jersey	P	Active	
694	Alpha Delta Chi	February 28, 1998 – July 14, 2007	Our Lady of the Lake University	San Antonio, Texas	D	Inactive	
695	Alpha Delta Psi	February 21, 1998 – February 6, 2010	Lindsey Wilson College	Columbia, Kentucky	I	Inactive	
696	Alpha Delta Omega	March 20, 1998 – June 19, 2021	Saint Vincent College	Latrobe, Pennsylvania	O	Inactive	
697	Alpha Epsilon Alpha	May 3, 1998 – February 5, 2005	Alderson-Broaddus College	Philippi, West Virginia	M	Inactive	
698	**Alpha Epsilon Beta**	May 17, 1998	Ohio Northern University	Ada, Ohio	H	Active	
699	Alpha Epsilon Gamma	September 18, 1998 – February 16, 2002	Montana State University Billings	Billings, Montana	A	Inactive	
700	Alpha Epsilon Delta	December 5, 1998 – February 7, 2004	Goldey–Beacom College	Wilmington, Delaware	P	Inactive	
701	Alpha Epsilon Epsilon	December 5, 1998 – October 8, 2022	Henderson State University	Arkadelphia, Arkansas	D	Inactive	
702	**Alpha Epsilon Zeta**	December 12, 1998	University of Texas at Dallas	Richardson, Texas	D	Active	
703	Alpha Epsilon Eta	December 4, 1999 – January 26, 2018	Concord University	Athens, West Virginia	M	Inactive	
704	**Alpha Epsilon Theta**	March 12, 2000	University of Akron	Akron, Ohio	H	Active	
705	Alpha Epsilon Iota	September 9, 2000 – February 3, 2007	Xavier University	Cincinnati, Ohio	H	Inactive	
706	Alpha Epsilon Kappa	December 3, 2000 – 20xx ?	Cedar Crest College	Allentown, Pennsylvania	O	Inactive	
707	**Alpha Epsilon Lambda**	March 10, 2001	McDaniel College	Westminster, Maryland	N	Active	
708	Alpha Epsilon Mu	April 28, 2001 – February 3, 2007	Concordia University	Seward, Nebraska	C	Inactive	
709	**Alpha Epsilon Nu**	May 5, 2001	University of San Francisco	San Francisco, California	A	Active	
710	Alpha Epsilon Xi	April 13, 2002 – February 4, 2006	LaGrange College	LaGrange, Georgia	J	Inactive	
711	Alpha Epsilon Omicron	April 13, 2002 – March 1, 2021	Siena Heights University	Adrian, Michigan	G	Inactive	
712	Alpha Epsilon Pi	September 7, 2003 – October 8, 2022	Georgia Military College	Milledgeville, Georgia	J	Inactive	
713	Alpha Epsilon Rho	October 11, 2003 – February 7, 2009	West Liberty University	West Liberty, West Virginia	O	Inactive	
714	Alpha Epsilon Sigma	November 22, 2003 – February 4, 2006	Saint Francis College	Brooklyn, New York	P	Inactive	
715	Alpha Epsilon Tau	December 6, 2003 – January 30, 2016	University of Dallas	Irving, Texas	D	Inactive	
716	Alpha Epsilon Upsilon	February 20, 2004 – January 25, 2014	Barton College	Wilson, North Carolina	L	Inactive	
717	**Alpha Epsilon Phi**	October 29, 2004	Mississippi Valley State University	Itta Bena, Mississippi	J	Active	
718	Alpha Epsilon Chi	April 16, 2005 – June 25, 2016	Bethany College	Bethany, West Virginia	O	Inactive	
719	**Alpha Epsilon Psi**	May 4, 2005	Bridgewater College	Bridgewater, Virginia	M	Active	
720	**Alpha Epsilon Omega**	May 14, 2005	Southern Arkansas University	Magnolia, Arkansas	D	Active	
721	Alpha Zeta Alpha	September 11, 2005 – June 22, 2012	Virginia Intermont College	Bristol, Virginia	M	Inactive	
722	**Alpha Zeta Beta**	February 25, 2006	University of Hartford	West Hartford, Connecticut	R	Active	
723	**Alpha Zeta Gamma**	March 5, 2006	The College of New Jersey	Ewing, New Jersey	P	Active	
724	**Alpha Zeta Delta**	April 23, 2006	Lake Forest College	Lake Forest, Illinois	F	Active	
725	Alpha Zeta Epsilon	May 7, 2006 – January 28, 2012	College of Mount Saint Joseph	Cincinnati, Ohio	H	Inactive	
726	Alpha Zeta Zeta	October 21, 2006 – June 27, 2015	Husson University	Bangor, Maine	R	Inactive	
727	**Alpha Zeta Eta**	November 11, 2006	University of Alaska Anchorage	Anchorage, Alaska	A	Active	
728	Alpha Zeta Theta	November 12, 2006 – June 25, 2016	University of Alaska Southeast	Juneau, Alaska	A	Inactive	
729	Alpha Zeta Iota	November 12, 2006 – 20xx ?	Grand Valley State University	Allendale, Michigan	G	Inactive	
730	**Alpha Zeta Kappa**	December 2, 2006	Eastern Kentucky University	Richmond, Kentucky	I	Active	
731	Alpha Zeta Lambda	December 10, 2006 – 20xx ?	State University of New York at Cortland	Cortland, New York	Q	Inactive	
732	**Alpha Zeta Mu**	December 10, 2006	Shepherd University	Shepherdstown, West Virginia	N	Active	
733	Alpha Zeta Nu	December 9, 2006 – June 22, 2019	University of North Georgia	Dahlonega, Georgia	J	Inactive	
734	**Alpha Zeta Xi**	April 21, 2007	Lake Superior State University	Sault Sainte Marie, Michigan	G	Active	
735	Alpha Zeta Omicron	April 29, 2007 – June 22, 2019	Oakland University	Rochester, Michigan	G	Inactive	
736	Alpha Zeta Pi	December 7, 2008 – 20xx ?	University of Maryland, Baltimore County	Baltimore, Maryland	N	Inactive	
737	Alpha Zeta Rho	February 16, 2009 – 20xx ?	Defiance College	Defiance, Ohio	H	Inactive	
738	Alpha Zeta Sigma	April 26, 2009 – 20xx ?	Saint Anselm College	Goffstown, New Hampshire	R	Inactive	
739	Alpha Zeta Tau	April 25, 2010 – March 28, 2020	University of Pittsburgh at Johnstown	Johnstown, Pennsylvania	O	Inactive	
740	**Alpha Zeta Upsilon**	May 7, 2010	University of Nevada, Las Vegas	Paradise, Nevada	B	Active	
741	Alpha Zeta Phi	May 1, 2010 – 20xx ?	Regent University	Virginia Beach, Virginia	M	Inactive	
742	Alpha Zeta Chi	May 7, 2010 – January 26, 2012	New England College	Henniker, New Hampshire	R	Inactive	
743	Alpha Zeta Psi	November 21, 2011 – June 28, 2013	University of Wisconsin–Whitewater	Whitewater, Wisconsin	E	Inactive	
744	**Alpha Zeta Omega**	February 5, 2011	Parkland College	Champaign, Illinois	F	Active	
745	**Alpha Eta Alpha**	May 1, 2011	St. Thomas Aquinas College	Sparkill, New York	P	Active	
746	Alpha Eta Beta	August 13, 2011 – June 27, 2015	Art Institute of Washington	Arlington, Virginia	N	Inactive	
747	**Alpha Eta Gamma**	February 25, 2012	University of California, Merced	Merced, California	A	Active	
748	Alpha Eta Delta	March 17, 2012 – January 28, 2017	University of Illinois at Springfield	Springfield, Illinois	F	Inactive	
749	Alpha Eta Epsilon	April 29, 2012 – January 30, 2016	King University	Bristol, Tennessee	I	Inactive	
750	**Alpha Eta Zeta**	May 25, 2012	Clayton State University	Morrow, Georgia	J	Active	
751	**Alpha Eta Eta**	December 2, 2012	Saint Leo University	Saint Leo, Florida	K	Active	
752	Alpha Eta Theta	December 8, 2012 – April 1, 2021	University of the South	Sewanee, Tennessee	I	Inactive	
753	**Alpha Eta Iota**	June 1, 2013	University of Denver	Denver, Colorado	C	Active	
754	Alpha Eta Kappa	October 12, 2013 – June 19, 2021	California State University, Stanislaus	Turlock, California	A	Inactive	
755	**Alpha Eta Lambda**	February 8, 2014	Eureka College	Eureka, Illinois	F	Active	
756	Alpha Eta Mu	March 1, 2014 – June 19, 2021	SUNY Canton	Canton, New York	Q	Inactive	
757	**Alpha Eta Nu**	May 3, 2014	Furman University	Greenville, South Carolina	L	Active	
758	Alpha Eta Xi	September 21, 2014 – June 27, 2020	Alvernia University	Reading, Pennsylvania	O	Inactive	
759	**Alpha Eta Omicron**	January 31, 2015	Stockton University	Galloway Township, New Jersey	P	Active	
760	**Alpha Eta Pi**	February 7, 2015	St. John's University	Queens, New York	P	Active	
761	**Alpha Eta Rho**	April 11, 2015	Ohio University Lancaster	Lancaster, Ohio	H	Active	
762	Alpha Eta Sigma	September 27, 2015 – 20xx ?	Cazenovia College	Cazenovia, New York	Q	Active	
	**Canada Alpha**	December 13, 2015	University of British Columbia	Vancouver, British Columbia, Canada	A	Active	
763	**Alpha Eta Tau**	May 1, 2016	Hofstra University	Hempstead, New York	P	Active	
764	Alpha Eta Upsilon	May 26, 2016 – 20xx ?	University of Puerto Rico at Cayey	Cayey, Puerto Rico	K	Inactive	
765	Alpha Eta Phi	September 3, 2016 – 20xx ?	DeSales University	Center Valley, Pennsylvania	O	Active	
766	**Alpha Eta Chi**	September 18, 2016	Bellarmine University	Louisville, Kentucky	I	Active	
767	Alpha Eta Psi	September 26, 2016 – June 22, 2019	Siena College	Loudonville, New York	Q	Inactive	
768	Alpha Eta Omega	December 10, 2016 – June 24, 2023	Emerson College	Boston, Massachusetts	R	Inactive	
769	**Alpha Theta Alpha**	February 26, 2017	Saint Joseph's University	Philadelphia, Pennsylvania	P	Active	
770	**Alpha Theta Beta**	May 7, 2017	Morehead State University	Morehead, Kentucky	I	Active	
771	Alpha Theta Gamma	October 20, 2017 – June 19, 2021	University of Colorado Colorado Springs	Colorado Springs, Colorado	C	Inactive	
772	Alpha Theta Delta	December 2, 2017 – June 19, 2021	University of South Florida St. Petersburg	St. Petersburg, Florida	K	Inactive	
773	**Alpha Theta Epsilon**	June 2, 2018	Georgia State University	Atlanta, Georgia	J	Active	
780	**Alpha Theta Mu**	March 25, 2021	Kennesaw State University	Kennesaw, Georgia	J	Active	
781	**Alpha Theta Nu**	June 26, 2021	Kettering University	Flint, Michigan	G	Active	
782	**Alpha Theta Xi**	February 18, 2022	St. Petersburg College	St. Petersburg, Florida	K	Active	
783	**Alpha Theta Omicron**	November 22, 2024	Florida SouthWestern State College	Fort Myers, Florida	K	Active	
784	**Alpha Theta Pi**	April 7, 2025	National University	San Diego, California	J	Active	
785	**Alpha Theta Rho**	May 2, 2026	Governors State University	University Park, Illinois	F	Active	
786	**Alpha Theta Sigma**	May 16, 2026	Lincoln University	Jefferson City, Missouri	C	Active	
787	Alpha Theta Tau	August 31, 2026	University of Maryland - Global Campus	Hanover, MD	N	Active	
	Bowie State University		Bowie State University	Bowie, MD	N	Petitioning Group	
	Elizabethtown College		Elizabethtown College	Elizabethtown, Pennsylvania	O	Petitioning Group	(Note: Petitioning Group was formed on December 8, 2024.)
	Florida Gulf Coast University		Florida Gulf Coast University	Fort Myers, Florida	K	Petitioning Group	
	Georgia College & State University		Georgia College & State University	Milledgeville, Georgia	J	Petitioning Group	
	Louisiana State University Shreveport		Louisiana State University Shreveport	Shreveport, Louisiana	J	Petitioning Group	
	University of Southern Indiana		University of Southern Indiana	Evansville, Indiana	H	Petitioning Group	

== Regions ==
Alpha Phi Omega organizes its U.S. chapters into eighteen regions. The regions are named using the alphabet letters, starting with "A" in the Pacific Northwest, then moving south and then east. Following is a list of the regions and the areas they cover.

=== Region A ===
- Alaska
- California's counties of Alameda, Alpine, Amador, Butte, Calaveras, Colusa, Contra Costa, Del Norte, El Dorado, Fresno, Glenn, Humboldt, Inyo, Kings, Lake, Lassen, Madera, Marin, Mariposa, Mendocino, Merced, Modoc, Mono, Monterey, Napa, Nevada, Placer, Plumas, Sacramento, San Benito, San Francisco, San Joaquin, San Mateo, Santa Clara, Santa Cruz, Shasta, Sierra, Siskiyou, Solano, Sonoma, Stanislaus, Sutter, Tehama, Trinity, Tulare, Tuolumne, Yolo, and Yuba; and Nevada's counties of Carson City, Churchill, Douglas, Elko, Esmeralda, Eureka, Humboldt, Lander, Lincoln, Lyon, Mineral, Nye, Pershing, Storey, Washoe, and White Pine
- Idaho
- Montana
- Oregon
- Washington

=== Region B ===
- Arizona
- California's counties of Imperial, Kern, Los Angeles, Orange, Riverside, San Bernardino, San Diego, San Luis Obispo, Santa Barbara, and Ventura
- Hawaii
- Nevada's Clark County
- New Mexico
- Utah
- all commonwealths, territories, and possessions of the United States located in the Western Waters

=== Region C ===
- Arkansas's counties of Baxter, Benton, Boone, Carroll, Clay, Cleburne, Conway, Craighead, Crawford, Crittenden, Cross, Faulkner, Franklin, Fulton, Greene, Independence, Izard, Jackson, Johnson, Lawrence, Logan, Madison, Marion, Mississippi, Newton, Perry, Poinsett, Pope, Randolph, Scott, Searcy, Sebastian, Sharp, St. Francis, Stone, Van Buren, Washington, White, Woodruff, and Yell
- Colorado
- Illinois's counties of Alexander, Bond, Clay, Clinton, Crawford, Edwards, Effingham, Fayette, Franklin, Gallatin, Hamilton, Hardin, Jackson, Jasper, Jefferson, Johnson, Lawrence, Madison, Marion, Massac, Monroe, Perry, Pope, Pulaski, Randolph, Richland, Saline, St. Clair, Union, Wabash, Washington, Wayne, White, and Williamson
- Kansas
- Missouri
- Nebraska
- Oklahoma
- Wyoming

=== Region D ===
- Arkansas's counties of Arkansas, Ashley, Bradley, Calhoun, Chicot, Clark, Cleveland, Columbia, Dallas, Desha, Drew, Garland, Grant, Hempstead, Hot Spring, Howard, Jefferson, Lafayette, Lee, Lincoln, Little River, Lonoke, Miller, Monroe, Montgomery, Nevada, Ouachita, Phillips, Pike, Polk, Prairie, Pulaski, Saline, Sevier, and Union
- Texas

=== Region E ===
- Iowa
- Minnesota
- North Dakota
- South Dakota
- Wisconsin

=== Region F ===
- Illinois's counties of Adams, Boone, Brown, Bureau, Calhoun, Carroll, Cass, Champaign, Christian, Clark, Coles, Cook, Cumberland, De Witt, DeKalb, Douglas, DuPage, Edgar, Ford, Fulton, Greene, Grundy, Hancock, Henderson, Henry, Iroquois, Jersey, Jo Daviess, Kane, Kankakee, Kendall, Knox, La Salle, Lake, Lee, Livingston, Logan, Macon, Macoupin, Marshall, Mason, McDonough, McHenry, McLean, Menard, Mercer, Montgomery, Morgan, Moultrie, Ogle, Peoria, Piatt, Pike, Putnam, Rock Island, Sangamon, Schuyler, Scott, Shelby, Stark, Stephenson, Tazewell, Vermilion, Warren, Whiteside, Will, Winnebago and Woodford
- Indiana's counties of Jasper, Lake, LaPorte, Newton, Porter, and Starke

=== Region G ===
- Michigan

=== Region H ===
- Indiana's counties of Adams, Allen, Bartholomew, Benton, Blackford, Boone, Brown, Carroll, Cass, Clark, Clay, Clinton, Crawford, Daviess, Dearborn, Decatur, DeKalb, Delaware, Dubois, Elkhart, Fayette, Floyd, Fountain, Franklin, Fulton, Gibson, Grant, Greene, Hamilton, Hancock, Harrison, Hendricks, Henry, Howard, Huntington, Jackson, Jay, Jefferson, Jennings, Johnson, Knox, Kosciusko, LaGrange, Lawrence, Madison, Marion, Marshall, Martin, Miami, Monroe, Montgomery, Morgan, Noble, Ohio, Orange, Owen, Parke, Perry, Pike, Posey, Pulaski, Putnam, Randolph, Ripley, Rush, Scott, Shelby, Spencer, St. Joseph, Steuben, Sullivan, Switzerland, Tippecanoe, Tipton, Union, Vanderburgh, Vermillion, Vigo, Wabash, Warren, Warrick, Washington, Wayne, Wells, White and Whitley
- Kentucky's counties of Boone, Campbell, and Kenton
- Ohio

=== Region I ===
- Kentucky's counties of Adair, Allen, Anderson, Ballard, Barren, Bath, Bell, Bourbon, Boyd, Boyle, Bracken, Breathitt, Breckinridge, Bullitt, Butler, Caldwell, Calloway, Carlisle, Carroll, Carter, Casey, Christian, Clark, Clay, Clinton, Crittenden, Cumberland, Daviess, Edmonson, Elliott, Estill, Fayette, Fleming, Floyd, Franklin, Fulton, Gallatin, Garrard, Grant, Graves, Grayson, Green, Greenup, Hancock, Hardin, Harlan, Harrison, Hart, Henderson, Henry, Hickman, Hopkins, Jackson, Jefferson, Jessamine, Johnson, Knott, Knox, Larue, Laurel, Lawrence, Lee, Leslie, Letcher, Lewis, Lincoln, Livingston, Logan, Lyon, Madison, Magoffin, Marion, Marshall, Martin, Mason, McCracken, McCreary, McLean, Meade, Menifee, Mercer, Metcalfe, Monroe, Montgomery, Morgan, Muhlenberg, Nelson, Nicholas, Ohio, Oldham, Owen, Owsley, Pendleton, Perry, Pike, Powell, Pulaski, Robertson, Rockcastle, Rowan, Russell, Scott, Shelby, Simpson, Spencer, Taylor, Todd, Trigg, Trimble, Union, Warren, Washington, Wayne, Webster, Whitley, Wolfe, and Woodford
- Tennessee
- Virginia's counties of Buchanan, Dickenson, Lee, Norton, Russell, Scott, and Wise
- West Virginia's counties of Cabell and Wayne

=== Region J ===
- Alabama
- Georgia
- Louisiana
- Mississippi

=== Region K ===
- Florida
- Puerto Rico
- All commonwealths, territories, and possessions of the United States located in the Eastern Waters

=== Region L ===
- North Carolina's counties of Alamance, Alexander, Alleghany, Anson, Ashe, Avery, Beaufort, Bertie, Bladen, Brunswick, Buncombe, Burke, Cabarrus, Caldwell, Cartere, Caswell, Catawba, Chatham, Cherokee, Chowan, Clay, Cleveland, Columbus, Craven, Cumberland, Dare, Davidson, Davie, Duplin, Durham, Edgecombe, Forsyth, Franklin, Gaston, Gates, Graham, Granville, Greene, Guilford, Halifax, Harnett, Haywood, Henderson, Hertford, Hoke, Hyde, Iredell, Jackson, Johnston, Jones, Lee, Lenoir, Lincoln, Macon, Madison, Martin, McDowell, Mecklenburg, Mitchell, Montgomery, Moore, Nash, New, Northampton, Onslow, Orange, Pamlico, Pende, Perquimans, Person, Pitt, Polk, Randolph, Richmond, Robeson, Rockingham, Rowan, Rutherford, Sampson, Scotland, Stanly, Stokes, Surry, Swain, Transylvania, Tyrrell, Union, Vance, Wake, Warren, Washington, Watauga, Wayne, Wilkes, Wilson, Yadkin, and Yancey
- South Carolina

=== Region M ===
- North Carolina's counties of Camden, Currituck, and Pasquotank
- Virginia's counties or independent cities Albemarle, Alleghany, Amelia, Amherst, Appomattox, Augusta, Bath, Bedford, Bedford City, Bland, Botetourt, Bristol, Brunswick, Buckingham, Buena Vista, Campbell, Caroline, Carroll, Charles City, Charlotte, Charlottesville, Chesapeake, Chesterfield, Clarke, Colonial Heights, Covington, Craig, Culpeper, Cumberland, Danville, Dinwiddie, Emporia, Essex, Fauquier, Floyd, Fluvanna, Franklin, Franklin City, Frederick, Fredericksburg, Galax, Giles, Gloucester, Goochland, Grayson, Greene, Greensville, Halifax, Hampton, Hanover, Harrisonburg, Henrico, Henry, Highland, Hopewell, Isle of Wight, James City, King and Queen, King George, King William, Lancaster, Lexington, Louisa, Lunenburg, Lynchburg, Madison, Manassas, Manassas Park, Martinsville, Mathews, Mecklenburg, Middlesex, Montgomery, Nelson, New Kent, Newport News, Norfolk, Northumberland, Nottoway, Orange, Page, Patrick, Petersburg, Pittsylvania, Poquoson, Portsmouth, Powhatan, Prince Edward, Prince George, Prince William, Pulaski, Radford, Rappahannock, Richmond, Richmond City, Roanoke, Roanoke City, Rockbridge, Rockingham, Salem, Shenandoah, Smyth, Southampton, Spotsylvania, Stafford, Staunton, Suffolk, Surry, Sussex, Tazewell, Virginia Beach, Warren, Washington, Waynesboro, Westmoreland, Williamsburg, Winchester, Wythe, and York
- West Virginia's counties of Barbour, Boone, Braxton, Calhoun, Clay, Doddridge, Fayette, Gilmer, Grant, Greenbrier, Hampshire, Hardy, Harrison, Jackson, Kanawha, Lewis, Lincoln, Logan, Mason, McDowell, Mercer, Mineral, Mingo, Monroe, Nicholas, Pendleton, Pleasants, Pocahontas, Preston, Putnam, Raleigh, Randolph, Ritchie, Roane, Summers, Taylor, Tucker, Tyler, Upshur, Washington, Webster, Wirt, Wood, and Wyoming

=== Region N ===
- District of Columbia
- Maryland

=== Region O ===
- Pennsylvania's counties of Adams, Allegheny, Armstrong, Beaver, Bedford, Berks, Blair, Bradford, Butler, Cambria, Cameron, Carbon, Centre, Clarion, Clearfield, Clinton, Columbia, Crawford, Cumberland, Dauphin, Elk, Erie, Fayette, Forest, Franklin, Fulton, Greene, Huntingdon, Indiana, Jefferson, Juniata, Lackawanna, Lancaster, Lawrence, Lebanon, Lehigh, Luzerne, Lycoming, Mercer, Mifflin, Monroe, Montour, Northampton, Northumberland, Perry, Pike, Potter, Schuylkill, Snyder, Somerset, Sullivan, Susquehanna, Tioga, Union, Venango, Warren, Washington, Wayne, Westmoreland, Wyoming, and York
- West Virginia's counties of Brooke, Hancock, Marion, Marshall, Monongalia, Ohio, and Wetzel

=== Region P ===
- Delaware
- New Jersey
- New York's counties of Bronx, Kings, Nassau, New York, Orange, Putnam, Queens, Richmond, Rockland, Suffolk, and Westchester
- Pennsylvania's counties of Bucks, Chester, Delaware, Montgomery, and Philadelphia

=== Region Q ===
- New York's counties of Albany, Allegany, Broome, Cattaraugus, Cayuga, Chautauqua, Chemung, Chenango, Clinton, Columbia, Cortland, Delaware, Dutchess, Erie, Essex, Franklin, Fulton, Genesee, Greene, Hamilton, Herkimer, Jefferson, Lewis, Livingston, Madison, Monroe, Montgomery, Niagara, Oneida, Onondaga, Ontario, Orleans, Oswego, Otsego, Rensselaer, Saratoga, Schenectady, Schoharie, Schuyler, Seneca, St. Lawrence, Steuben, Sullivan, Tioga, Tompkins, Ulster, Warren, Washington, Wayne, Wyoming, and Yates
- Pennsylvania's McKean County

=== Region R ===
- Connecticut,
- Maine
- Massachusetts
- New Hampshire
- Rhode Island
- Vermont

== See also ==
- List of Alpha Phi Omega members
