= Southeast New Mexico College =

Community college in Carlsbad, New Mexico, US

Coordinates: 32°26′32.3″N 104°15′56.1″W

- Former names: Carlsbad Instructional Center, New Mexico State University Carlsbad
- Motto: Find Your Direction!
- Type: Public community college
- Established: 1950
- President: Kevin Beardmore
- Location: Carlsbad, New Mexico, United States
- Colors: Copper and Turquoise
- Mascot: Eddy the Mountain Lion
- Website: senmc.edu

Southeast New Mexico College (formerly New Mexico State University Carlsbad) is a public community college in Carlsbad, New Mexico, United States.

== Background ==
The college was established in 1950 as Carlsbad Instructional Center. It later became a branch campus of New Mexico State University named New Mexico State University Carlsbad. In July 2021, the college became an independent public institution named Southeast New Mexico College.

== Academics ==
The college offers certificate programs and associate degrees. It is also the provider of Adult Basic Education services (ABE) and host the regional Small Business Development Center (SBDC) and the Manufacturing Sector Development Program (MSDP) that provides business and industry training in Eddy County. It is accredited by the Higher Learning Commission.
