= Vega Ancestral House =

Ancestral house in Balingasag, Misamis Oriental, Philippines

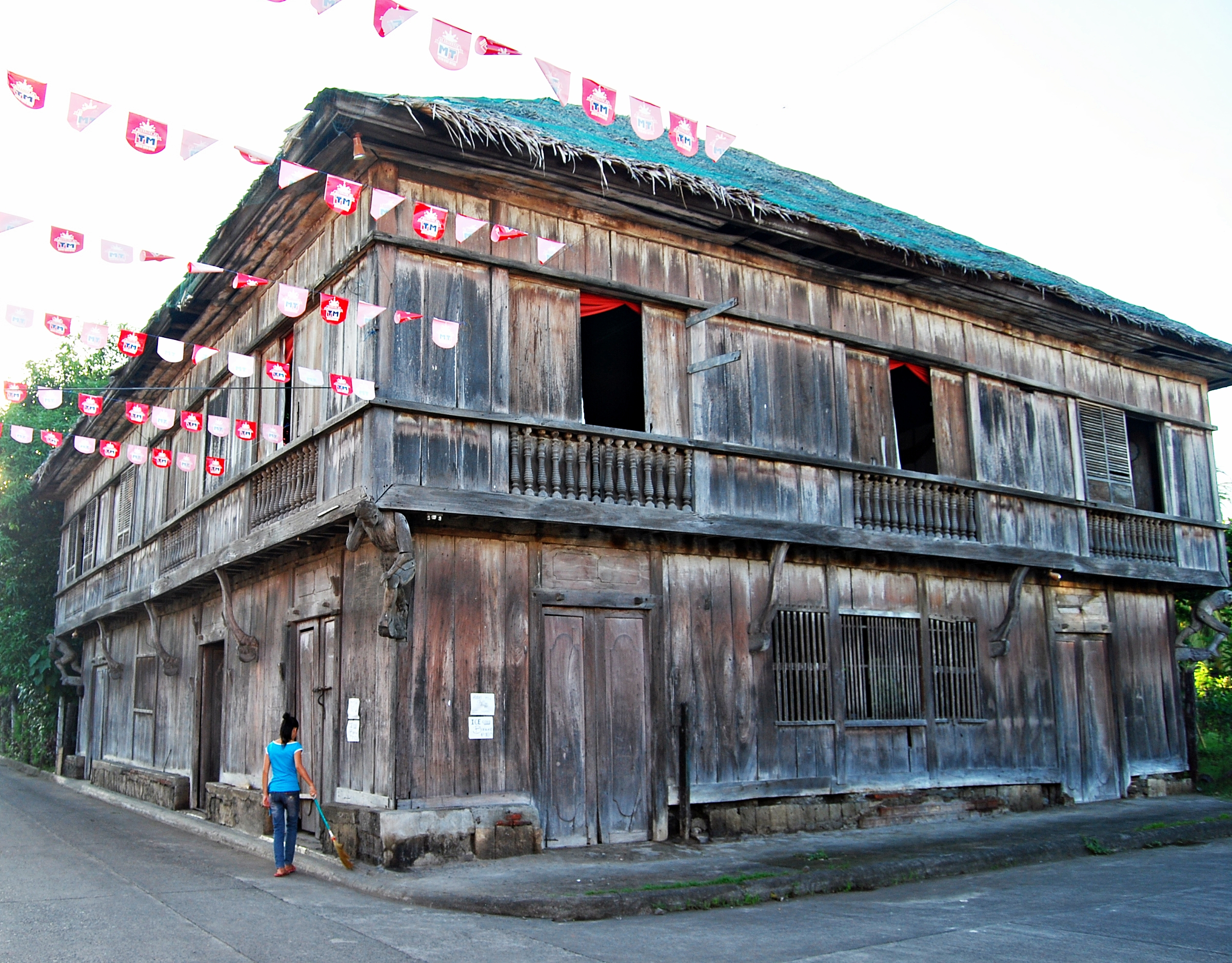
- Vega Ancestral House

- Location within Philippines

General information
- Type: Heritage House
- Architectural style: 1st Transition Bahay na Bato
- Location: Poblacion, Balingasag, Misamis Oriental, Northern Mindanao (Region X), Philippines
- Coordinates: 8.7433°N 124.7769°E
- Completed: 1800s

Technical details
- Material: Molave, Balayong, and Tugas (Visayan hardwoods)

Website
- Vega Ancestral House

The Vega Ancestral House is a Bahay na bato inspired house in the Philippines, estimated to be around 200 years old. The house is located in Población, Balingasag, Misamis Oriental.

The house features sculpted wooden figures which are similar to the Greek deity Atlas or Caryatides and known as "otí-ot" in the Visayan language. They support the overhang of the second-floor of the house.

== History ==
In the 1800s, Ignacio Juan Vega from San Nicolas, Cebu settled in Northern Mindanao in the town of Galas, now called Balingasag. Vega introduced the Cebuano devotion to the Sto. Niño to the townsfolk of Balingasag. Aside from this cultural practice, he also left behind a heritage house that is considered a landmark in Misamis Oriental.

== Features ==
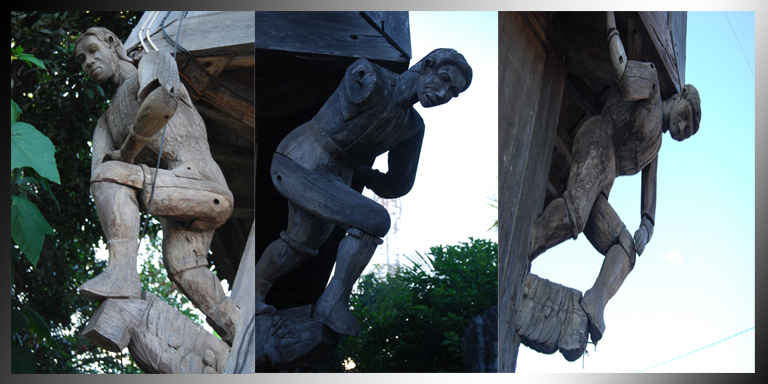
Sculpted Wooden Atlas

The house features sculpted wooden figures that serve as support structures for the protruding second floor. Three wooden figures are present, with one corner notably lacking such a support.

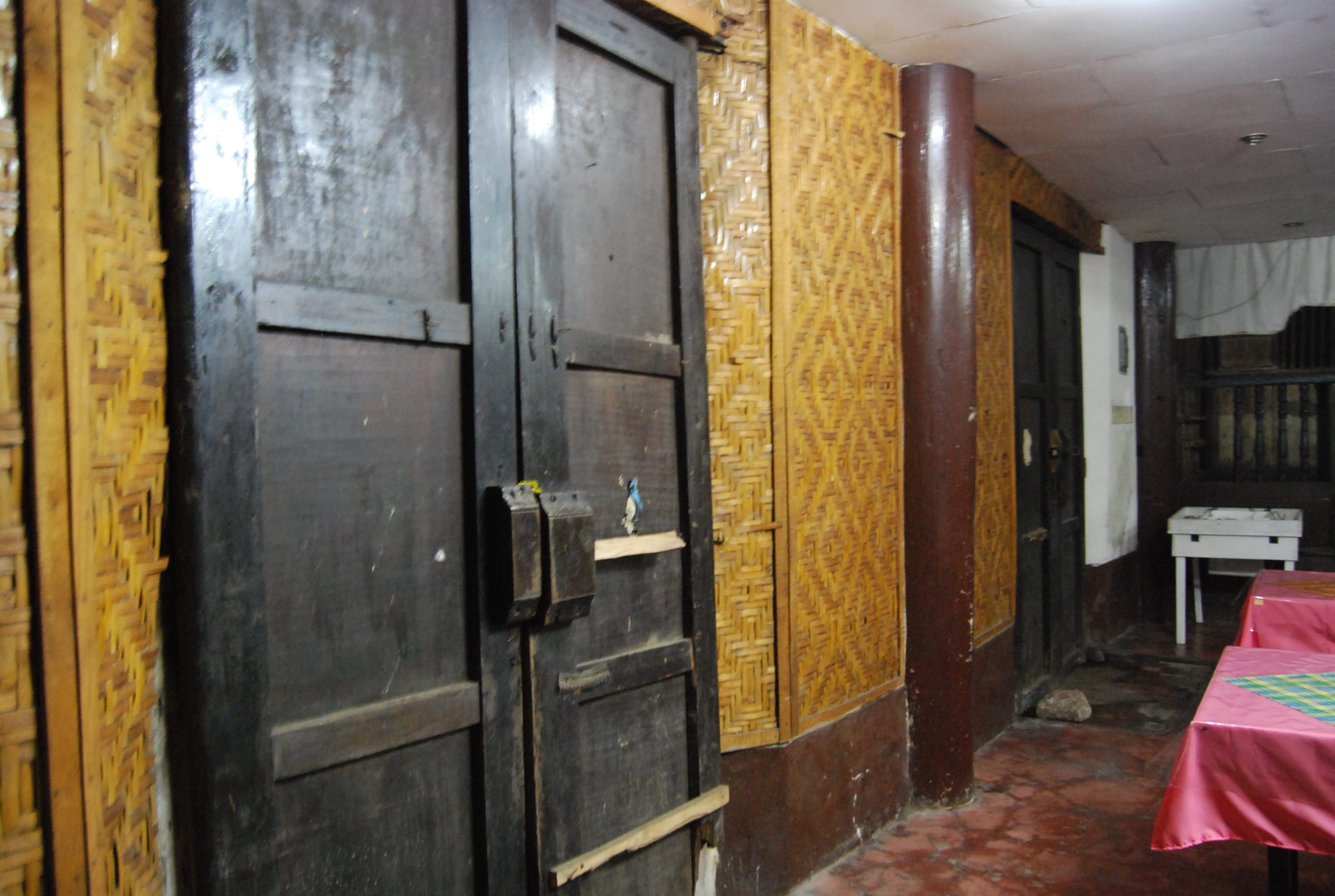
House Interior

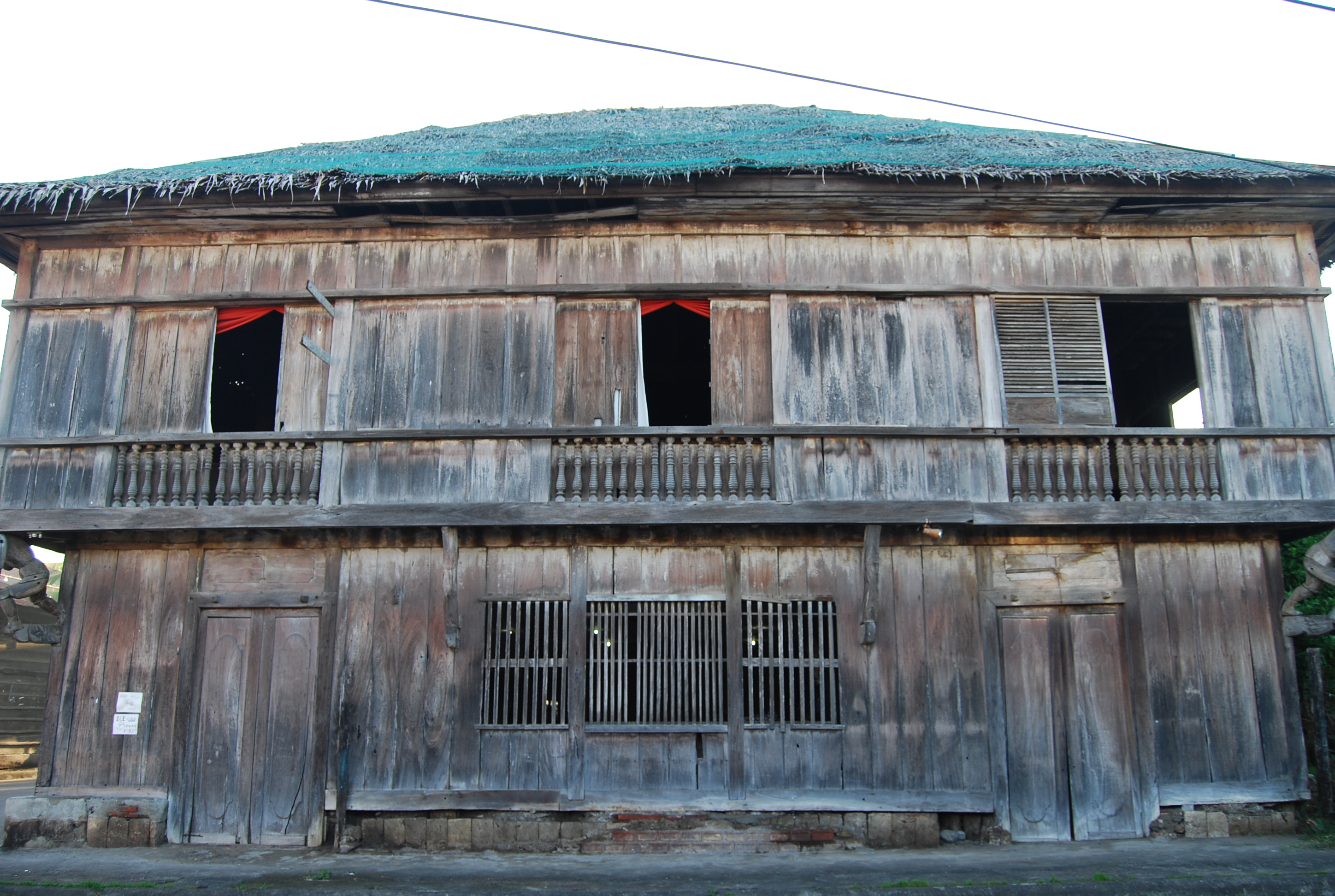
View of Vega Ancestral House

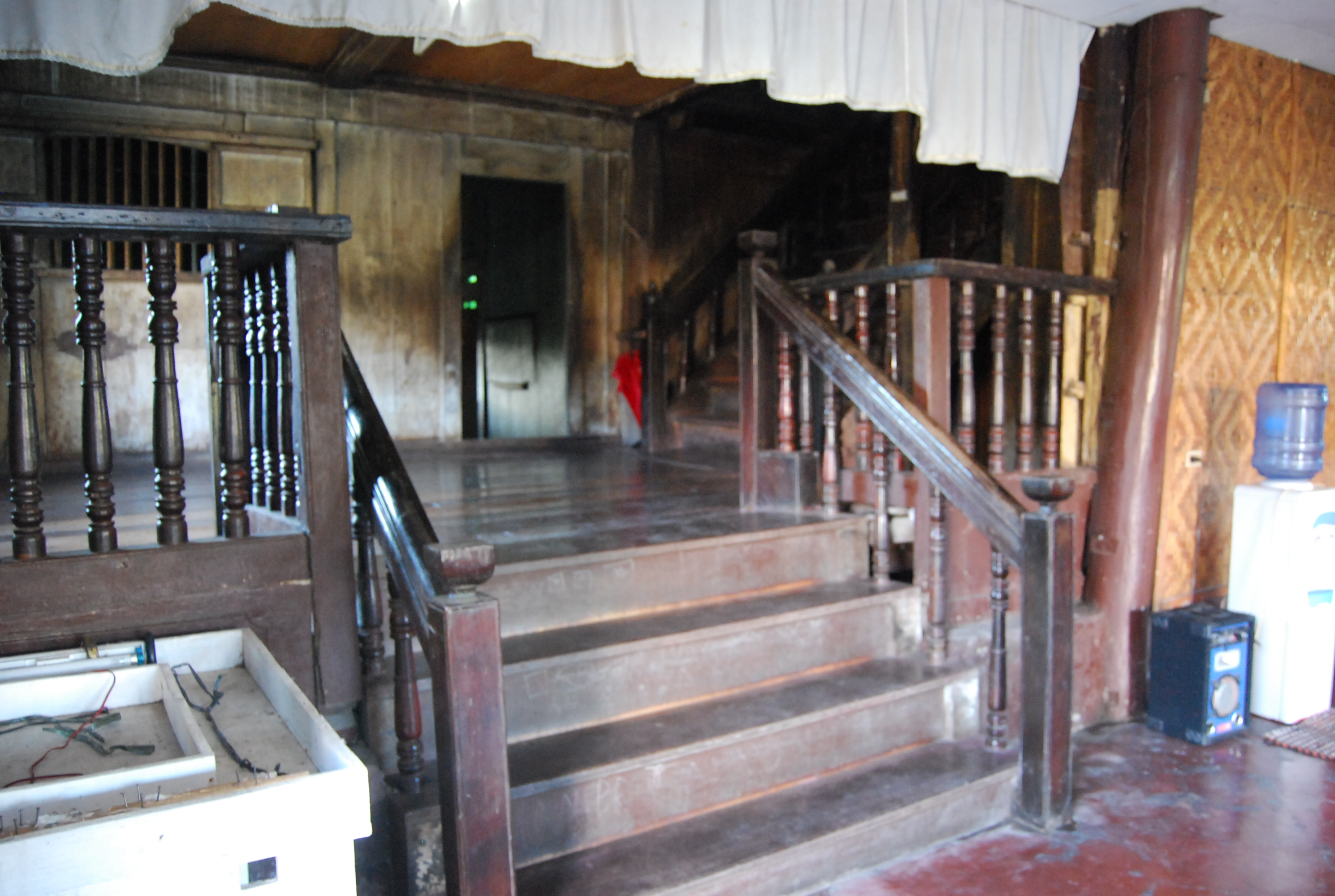
Stairs on Vega Ancestral House

The uppermost portion of the house features a classical cogon roof. This, along with the emerging stone works at the bottom part of the house, classifies the house under the 1st Transition of Bahay na bato. The support beams are decorated with the chambered nautilus motif.

== Tourism ==
The house is associated with Maria Clara Vega Jimenez—mother of television personality Inday Badiday and Philippine Daily Inquirer editor-in-chief Letty Jimenez Magsanoc. It is locally known as the "Vega House," not the "Jimenez House." Some mistakenly associate the house with the late child star Julie Vega due to her stage surname. However, her real name was Julie Pearl Apostol Postigo.

== Present times ==
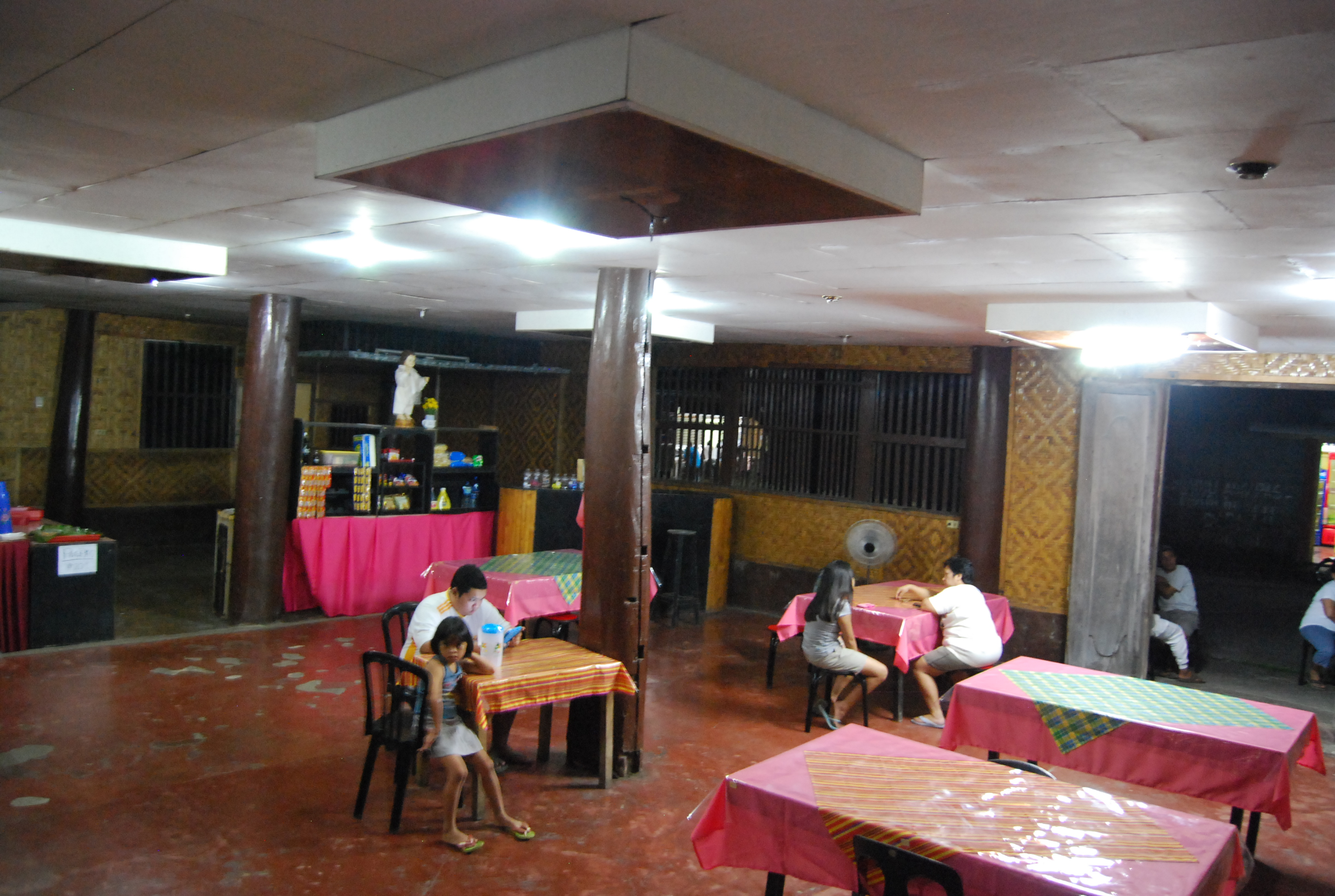
Vega House Restaurant/Carinderia

The house is currently closed to the public, but glimpses of the inside can be seen through the windows.

== Neighboring heritage houses ==
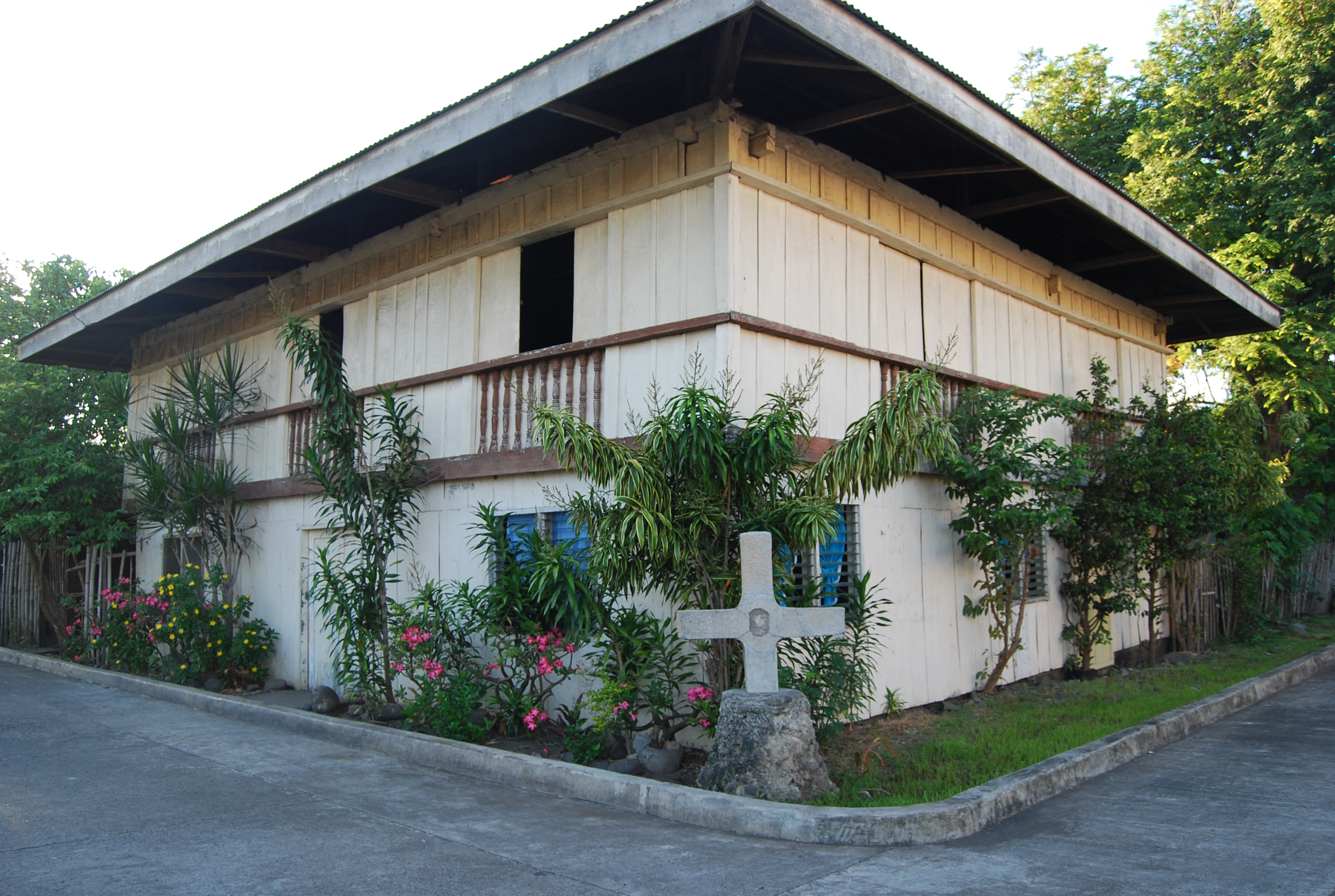

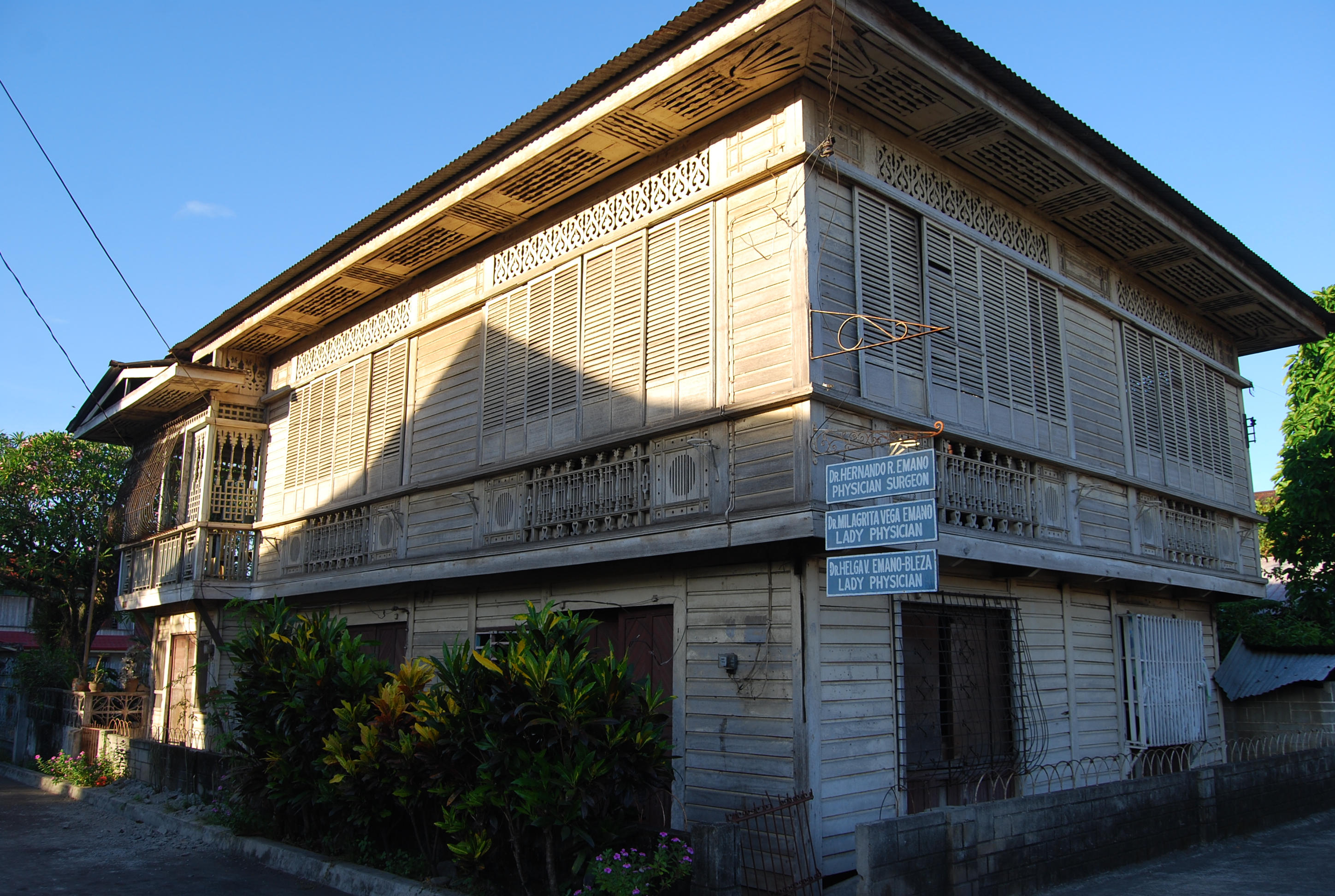

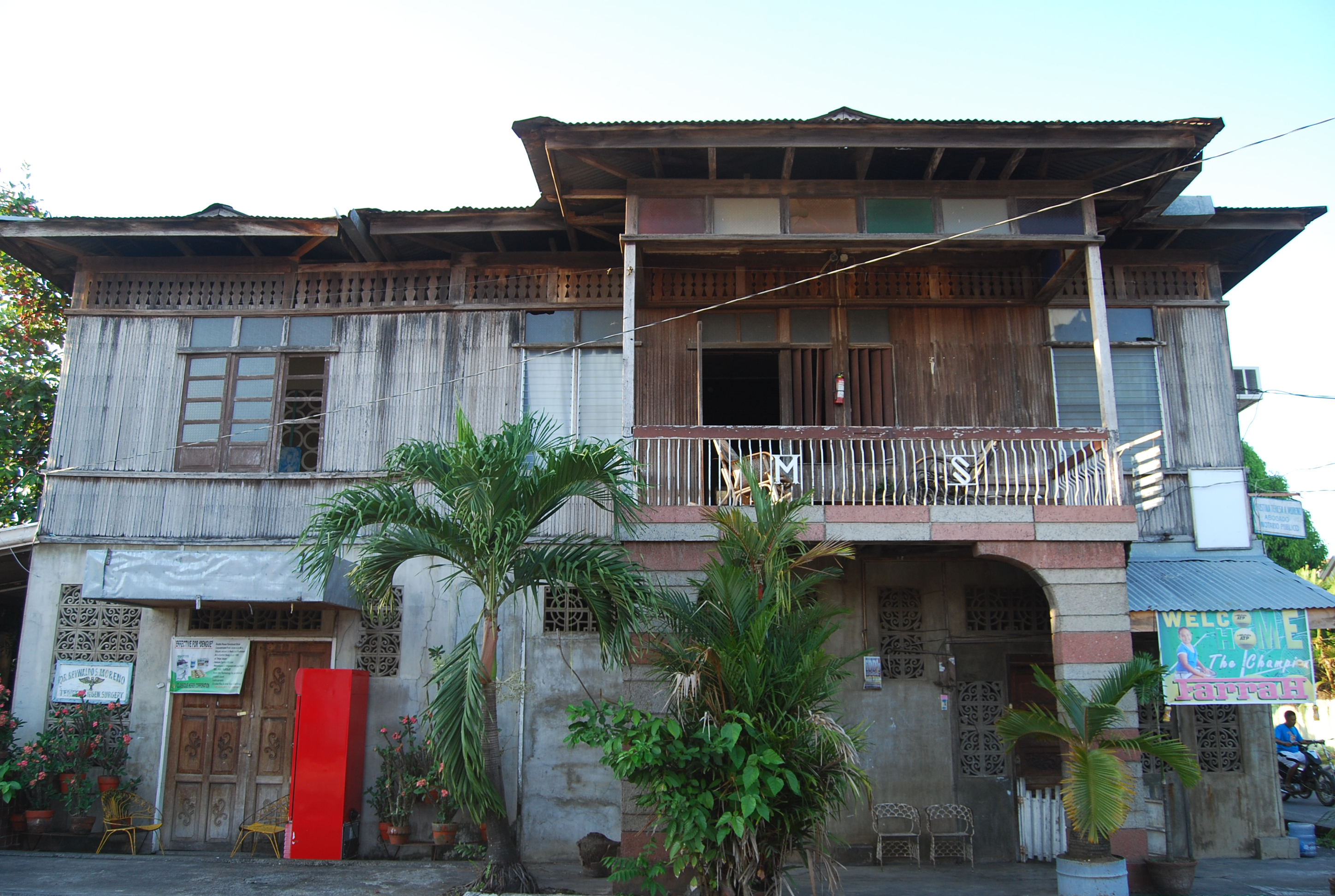

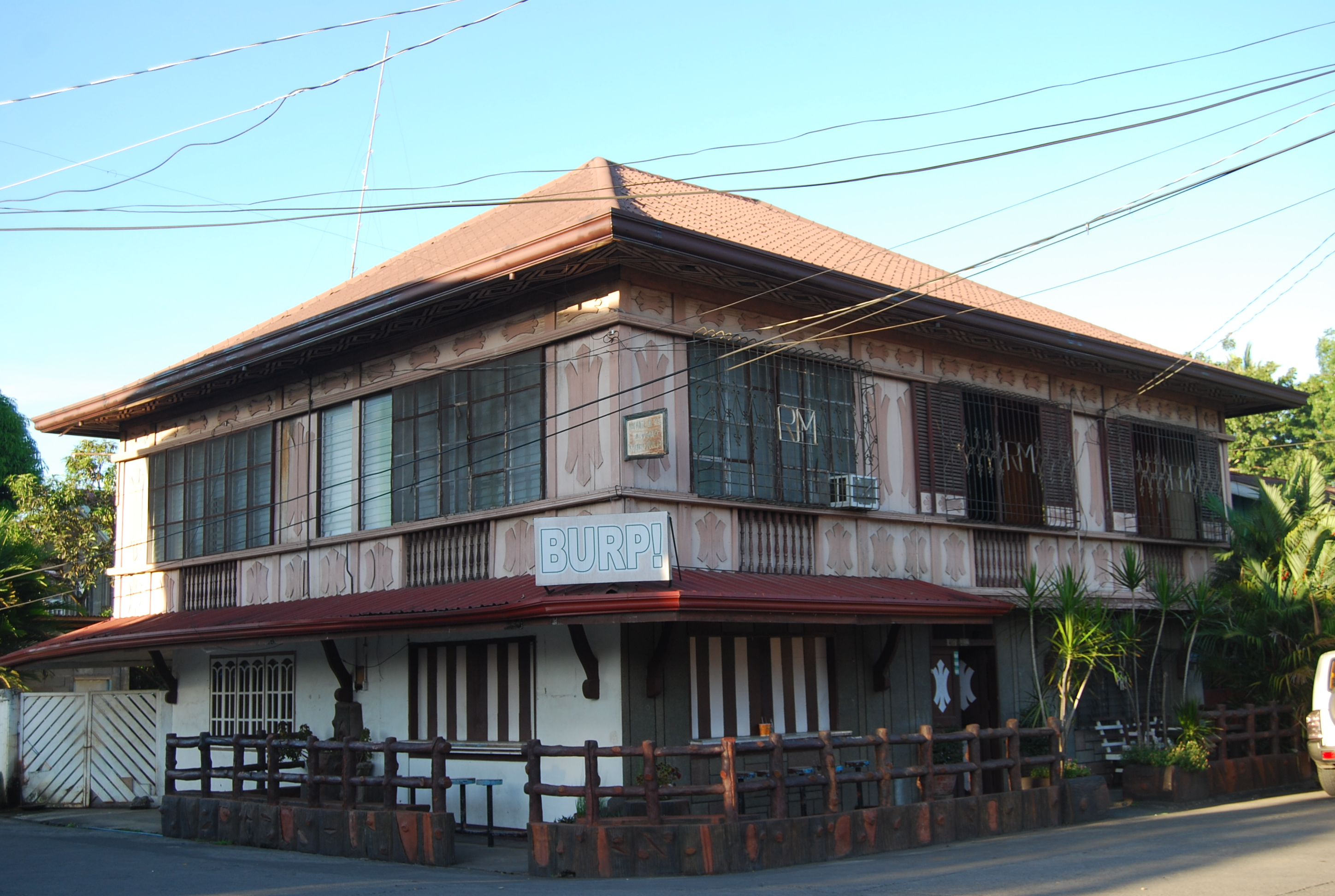

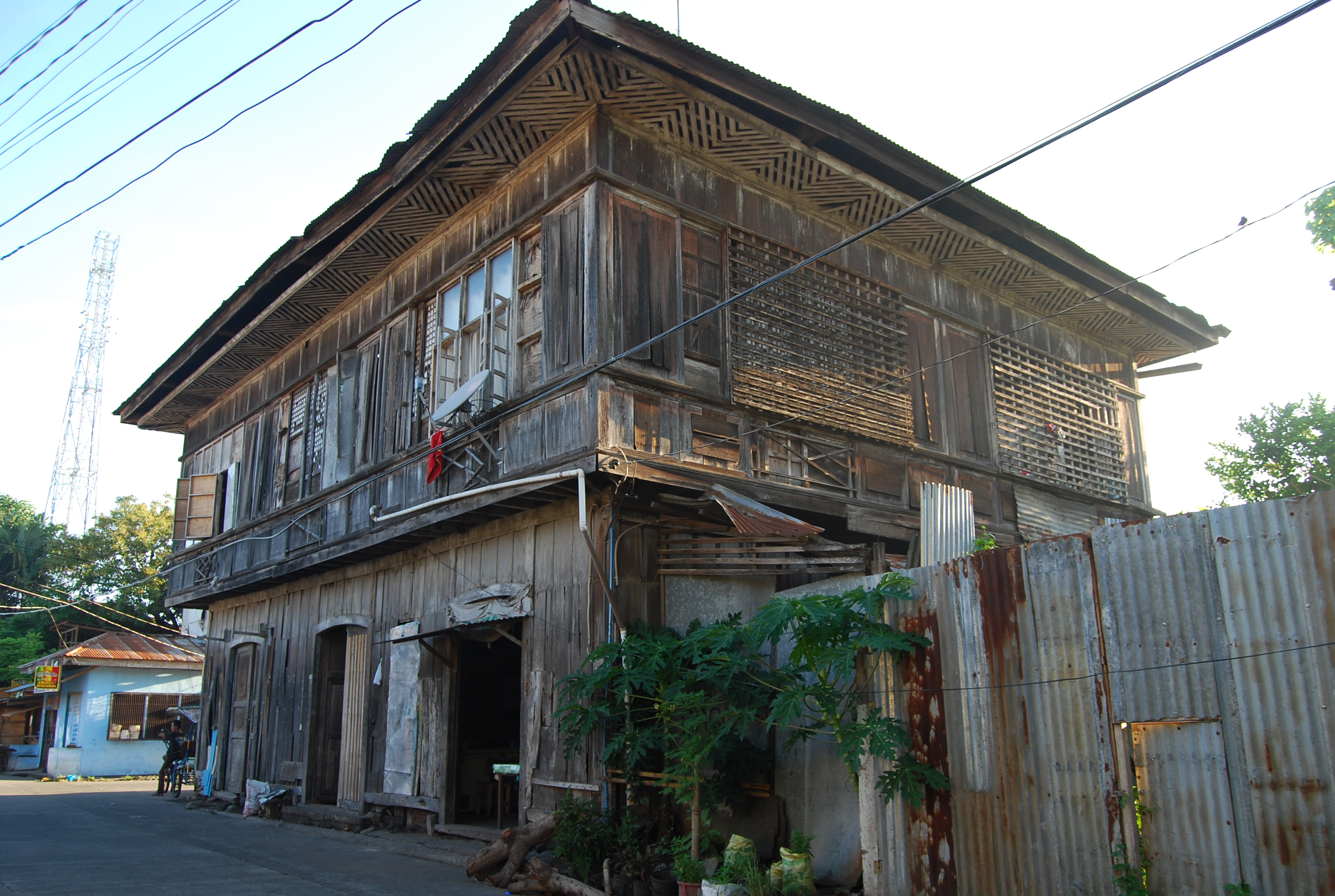

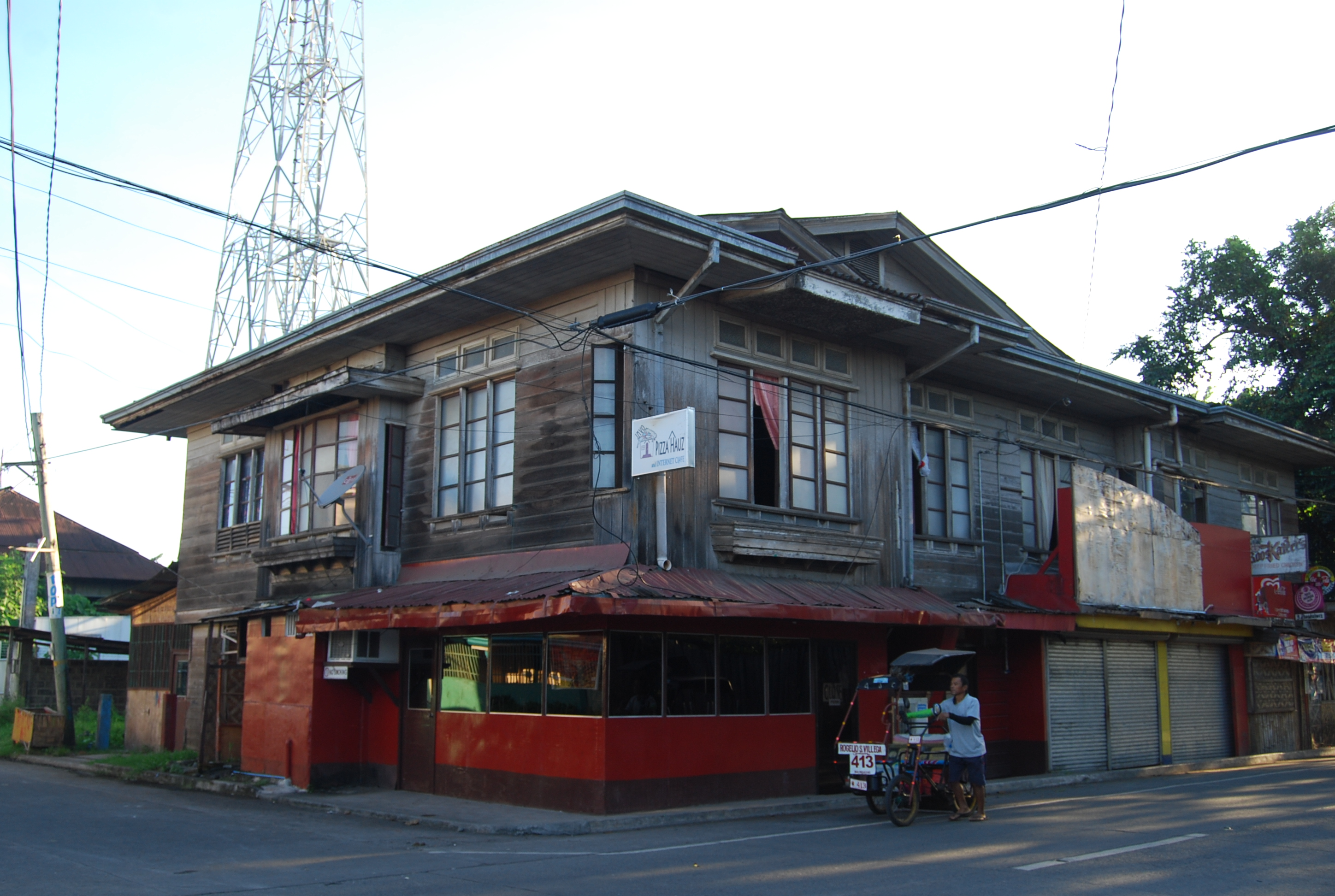

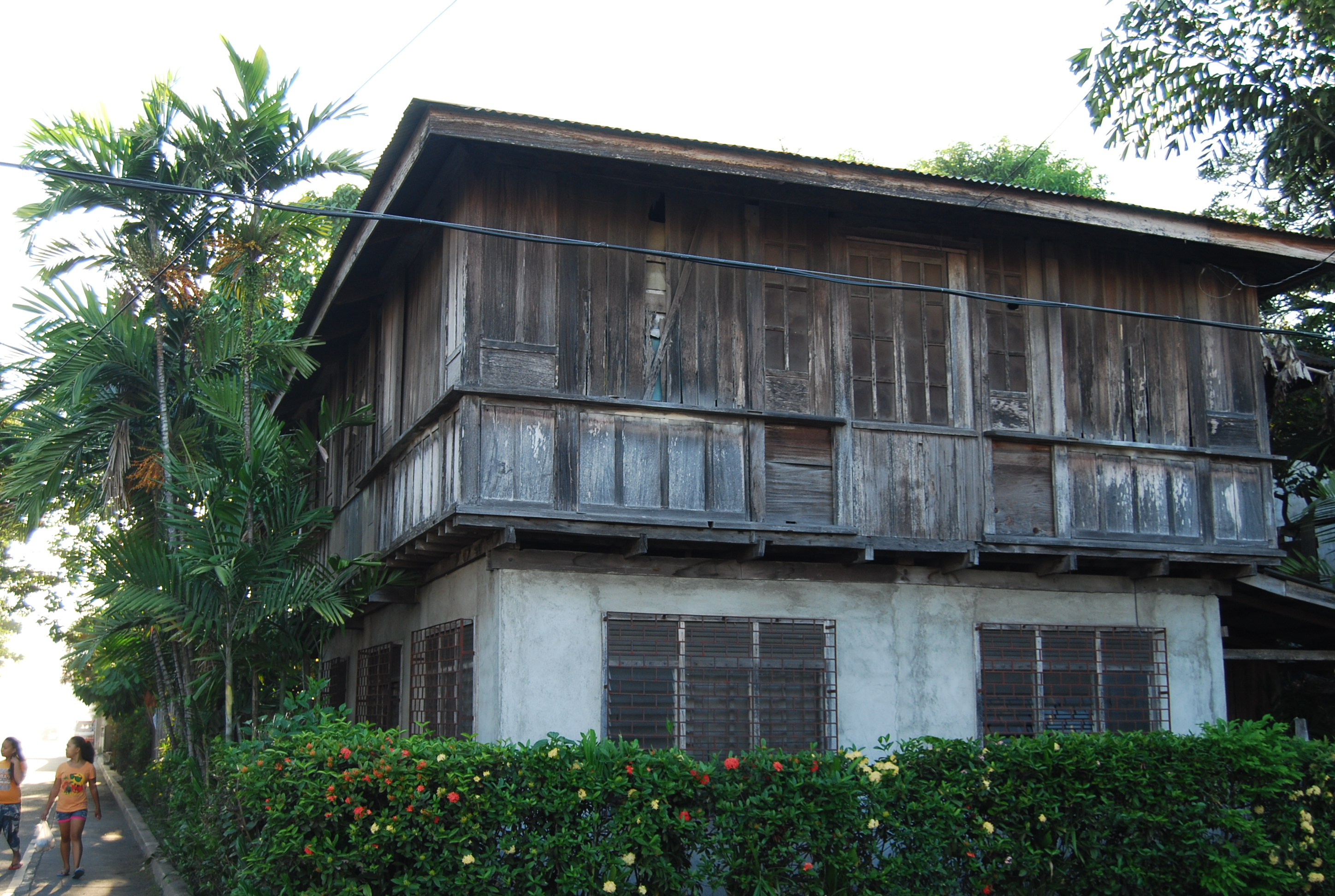

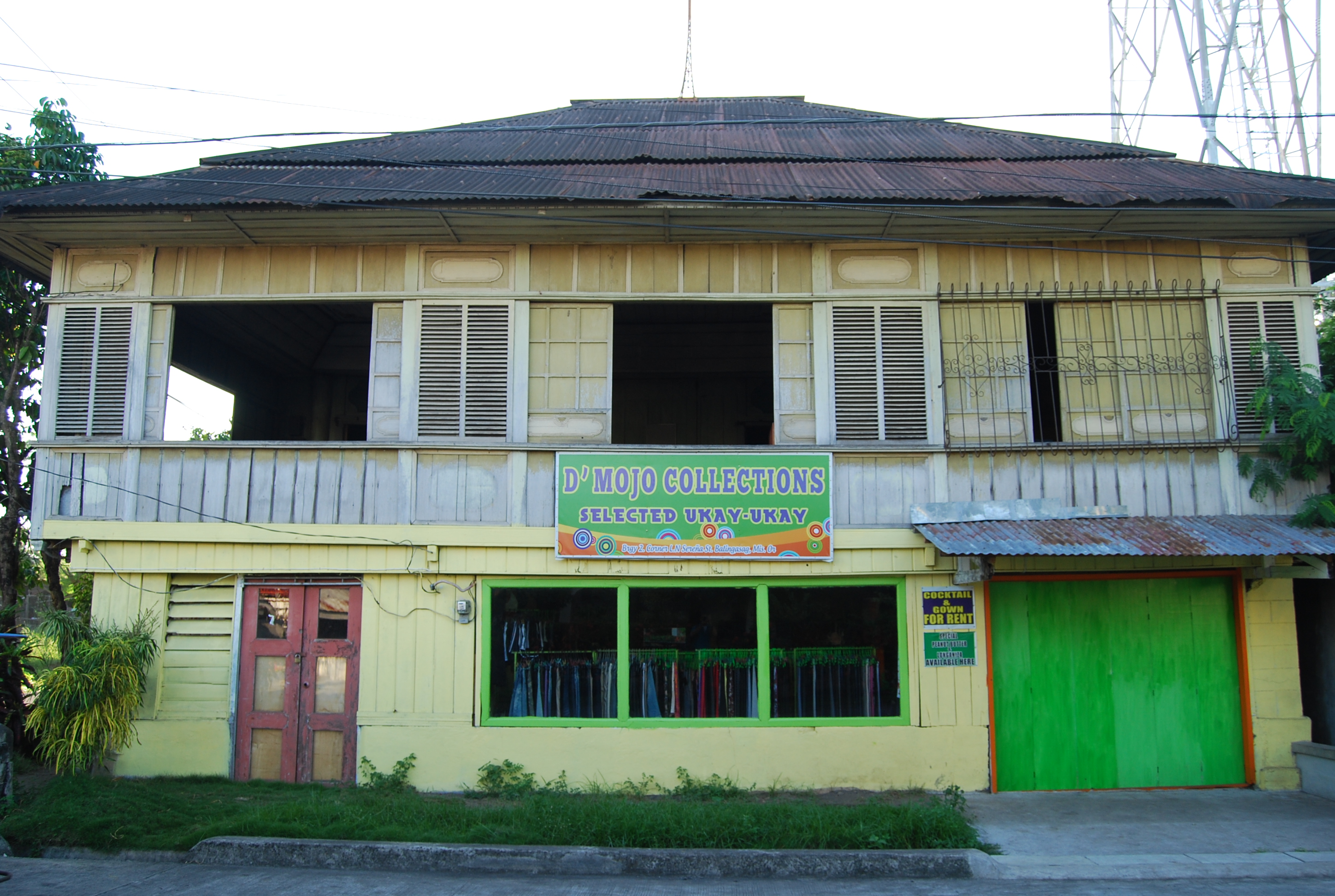

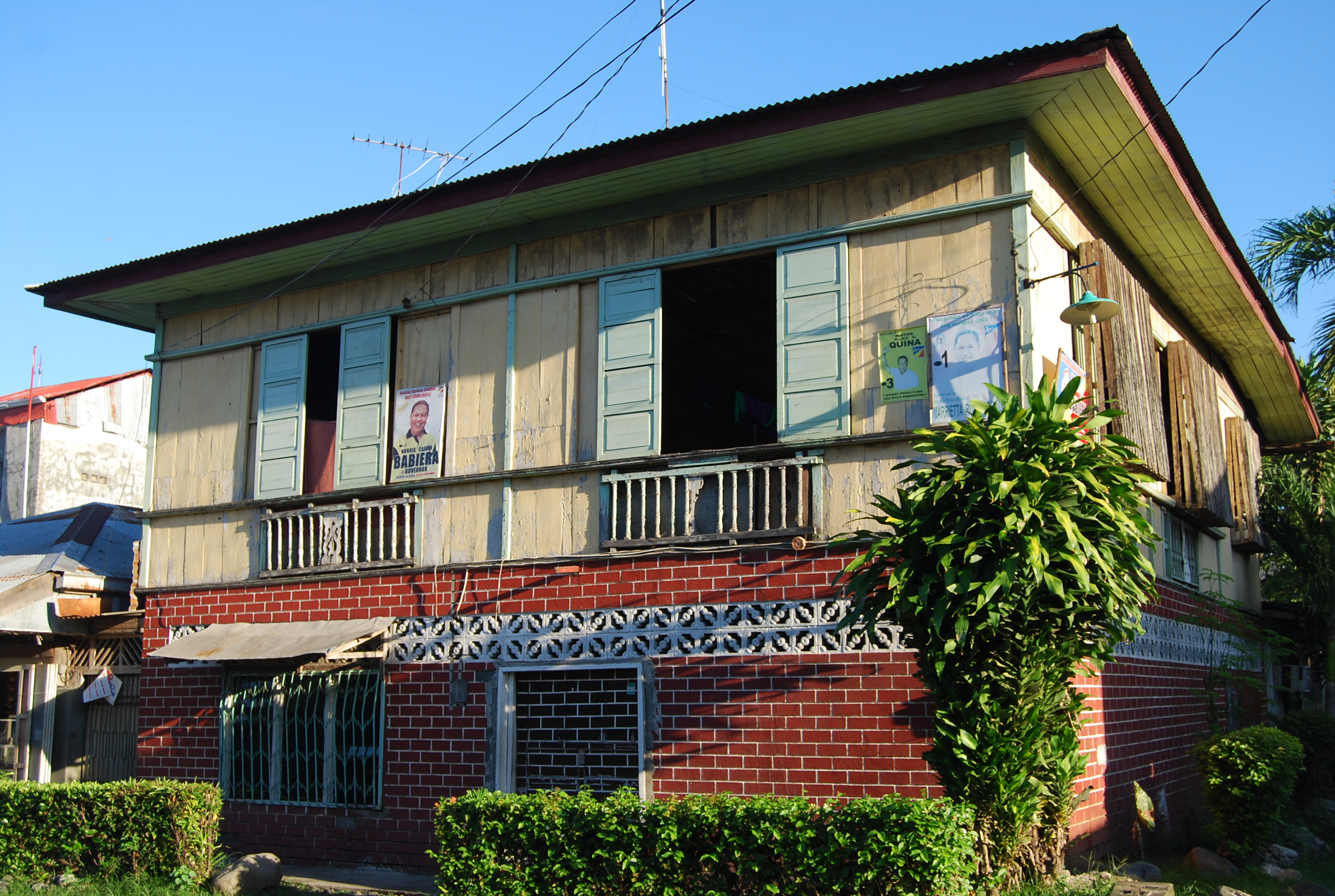

== See also ==
- Ancestral houses of the Philippines
- Cagayan de Oro
