= St. Rita's College of Balingasag =

Roman Catholic college in Misamis Oriental, Philippines

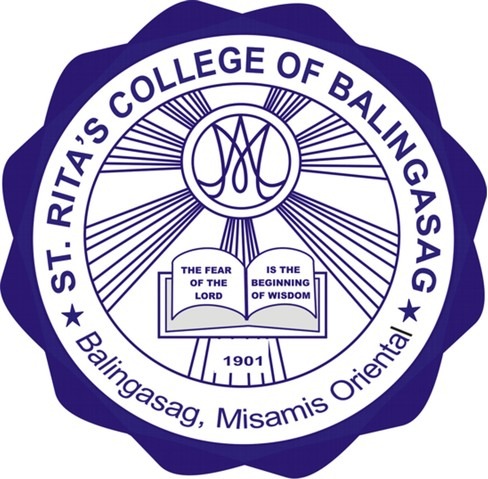
- Former names: St. Rita's School (1929); St. Rita's High School (1957); St. Rita's College (1995)
- Motto: Initium Sapientiae Timor Domini (Latin)
- Motto in English: The fear of the Lord is the beginning of wisdom
- Type: Private Roman Catholic Non-profit Coeducational Basic and Higher education institution
- Established: 1901
- Founders: Rev. Fr. Gregorio Parache, SJ
- Religious affiliation: Roman Catholic (RVM Sisters)
- Academic affiliations: PAASCU
- President: S. Ma. Jesusita L. Bernate, RVM
- Location: Brgy 3 Balingasag, Misamis Oriental, Philippines; 8°44′35″N 124°46′28″E
- Colors: Blue and White
- Nickname: Ritarian
- Website: www.srcb.edu.ph
- Location in Mindanao Location in the Philippines

St. Rita's College of Balingasag is a Roman Catholic, co-educational college in Balingasag, Misamis Oriental, Philippines. It was founded in 1901 by the Jesuit missionary Fr. Gregorio Parache, SJ.

== History ==
=== The beginnings ===
St. Rita's College of Balingasag is a Filipino, Catholic, co-educational RVM institution founded in 1901 by a Jesuit Missionary, Rev. Fr. Gregorio Parache, S.J., the parish priest as a parochial school aimed at giving basic education to the children of the parish. Four RVM Sisters: Ma. Marciana de Leon, RVM, Ma. Dominga de Jesus, RVM, Ma. Andrea Alba, RVM and Ma. Maura Lopez, RVM sent by Rev. M. Ma. Efigenia Alvarez, RVM, the Superior General of the Congregation, were among the first teachers.

In 1929, the Parochial School was formally named St. Rita's School, in honor of St. Rita de Cascia, Patroness of the Parish. It is the first Elementary School in Balingasag. In March 1931, Government Recognition was obtained. Mr. Alfredo Regalado was the first Principal. The RVM Sisters evangelized the pupils and the parishioners with zeal and perseverance.

=== Opening of the High School Department ===
At the outbreak of World War II from 1941-1945, the school operation was suspended. Upon Liberation in 1946, the Elementary classes resumed, and the High School classes were opened under the supervision of Fr. Clement Risacher, S.J, parish priest (1937-1949), while classroom management was delegated to M. Ma. Dolores Vega, RVM, Superior of the RVM Local Community. On April 10, 1949, the High School obtained government recognition. Mr. Vicente Villareal was the first Principal of the integrated Grade School and High School. The first batch of High School graduates was in 1949.

=== Turn-over of the School Administration ===
In 1957 the full administration of the school was formally turned over by the Jesuit parish priest to the RVM Congregation. The Sisters renovated the school and provided it with the necessary facilities for better educational service. The school was renamed St. Rita's High School

In 1963 the Elementary classes were temporarily closed for lack of enrollees and appropriate facilities.

=== Opening of the College Department ===
In 1968 M. Ma. Mercedes de Jesus, RVM, the Principal-Directress of the school, sensing the need of the high school graduates to pursue college education, applied for courses: Bachelor of Science in Commerce, Bachelor of Science in Secondary Education and Bachelor of Arts. These were granted government recognition on August 1, 1969. The succeeding courses were granted recognition on June 7, 1976. A building was constructed to accommodate the growing student population.

In 1995 St. Rita's High School was renamed St. Rita's College which eventually became St. Rita's College of Balingasag, Incorporated, upon registration with the Securities and Exchange Commission (SEC). New courses, including TESDA accredited courses, were opened.

== Accreditation initiatives ==
Quality education is always the goal of the RVM Ministry of Education. To achieve this goal, the RVM Chapter, the Highest Policy Making Body of the Congregation, mandated all RVM Schools to work for accreditation. In response to this mandate, the SRCB Administration initiated the process in the High School department during the SY 1995-96. Using Standard Norms of the Philippine Accrediting Association of Schools Colleges and Universities (PAASCU) the self-survey was undertaken leading to the PAASCU Preliminary visit on August 11-12, 1997 and the succeeding Formal Visit in February 28-29, 2000, the result of which was a three-year accredited status. This marks another significant event being the first and only accredited secondary school in Misamis Oriental, adding another milestone to the history of the school. The PAASCU Re-survey visit was done in September 2008. This visit merited the five-year accredited status granted by PAASCU as Level II Accreditation by the Federation of Accrediting Associations of the Philippines (FAAP). So far SRCB High School enjoys the prestige of being the only accredited secondary private school in Province of Misamis Oriental.

Similarly, the College Department initiated its departmental self-survey towards IQUAME.

== Elementary Department re-opened ==
The Elementary Department which was temporarily closed on July 1, 1963 was re-opened in SY 1995-96 and continued on until SY 1999-2000 when the complete Elementary course operated. Since then, the Grade School Department population continuously increased, producing pupils who excel in academics who could compete with the graduates of other quality schools.

The K-12 Enhancement Program of the Department of Education (DepEd) was initially implemented with the formal offering of the universal Kindergarten program during the school year 2011-2012. The succeeding K-12, Grades 7 followed the next school year 2012-2013 until 2016 when Senior High School shall be fully implemented.

== Service to the poor and non-formal education ==
Generosity in the service of others, especially the poor and concern for the welfare of others are values stated in the Mission Statement. To help the academic community go nearer its goals of helping the poor, SRCB adopted two (2) communities as early as 1996-1997, namely Sitio Macario Ladera and Sitio Cala-Cala. However, with the opening of the Mother Ignacia Skills Training Program (MISTP), a non-formal education program for the out-of-school youth (OSY) of the community, the administration decided to adopt only one community, Sitio Macario Ladera, since the latter could already stand on its own. This community was given to the high school department for their area of concern. The college department adopted a Sitio Barangay 6 instead.

The Mother Ignacia Skills Training Program (MISTP) now called RVM- Technical Training Program offers ten-month courses to help the OSY learn skills in Automotive, Electronics, Practical Electricity, Tailoring and Welding for their livelihood. Its operation started in June 1999 and is financially supported by the Mother Ignacia Development Foundation, Inc. (MIDFI).

Aside from these reach-out activities, the Community Extension Service of SRCB extended its expertise through different programs such as SRCB Trisikad Livelihood Project, MISTP Trainers' Financial Loan Program, Micro-Entrepreneurs' Loan Program and Women's Income Generating Program.

The Congregation approved the construction of a new high school building, an Audi-Gym, Sister's Convent and renovation of the grade school building. Blessing of the cornerstone was held on November 12, 2001. The Most Rev. Jesus B. Taquib, DD, blessed these three edifices on November 15, 2002. Construction of covered walk, new school gate, guard house and modern Science Laboratory are among the improvements done in the year 2007 and 2008.

SRCB offers new courses from 2010 until now. Among these are, Bachelor of Science in Criminology, Bachelor of Information Technology and Bachelor of Science in Hotel and Restaurant Management. This only shows that SRCB dreams for a better future of its students.

== List of sections in Grade School Department ==
Grade	Sections
Grade 1	St. Michael
Grade 2	St. Raphael
Grade 3	St. Gabriel
Grade 4	St. Joseph
Grade 5	St. Francis Xavier
Grade 6	St. Ignatius of Loyola

== List of sections in High School Department ==
Grade 7	Grade 8	Grade 9	Grade 10
Our Lady of Annunciation	Our Lady of Pillar	Our Lady of Peace	Mary Mediatrix of all Graces
Our Lady of Guadalupe	Our Lady of Loreto	Our Lady of Beaterio	Queenship of Mary
Our Lady of Immaculate Conception	Our Lady of Lourdes	Visitation of Mary	Nativity of our Lady
Our Lady of Assumption	Our Lady of Perpetual help	Our Lady of Mt. Carmel	Our Lady of Presentation

== Programs Offered ==
Bachelor of Science in Criminology	BSCrim
Bachelor of Science in Hospitality Management Program	BSHM
Bachelor of Science in Business Administration	BSBA
Bachelor of Science in Elementary Education	BEED
Bachelor of Secondary Education Major: English, Mathematics, Science and Filipino	
Bachelor of Science in Information Technology Program	BSIT
Kindergarten 1-2	
Grade 1-6	
Grade 7-10	
Humanities and Social Sciences	HUMSS
Science, Technology, Engineering and Mathematics	STEM
Accountancy, Business and Management	ABM

SRCB also offers technical courses which is called as "RVM-TTP" or Religious of the Virgin Mary- Technical Training Program.
