= Balingasag =

Municipality in Misamis Oriental, Philippines

- Municipality
- Municipality of Balingasag
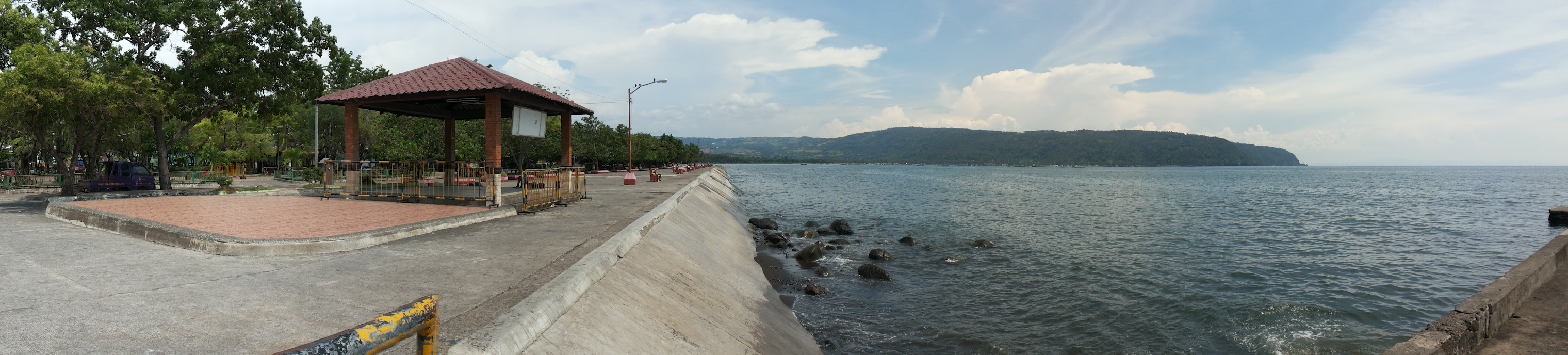
- Shorelines of Balingasag

- Flag Seal

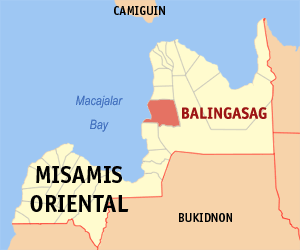
- Map of Misamis Oriental with Balingasag highlighted
- Interactive map of Balingasag
- Location within the Philippines
- Coordinates: 8°45′N 124°47′E
- Country: Philippines
- Region: Northern Mindanao
- Province: Misamis Oriental
- District: 1st district
- Founded: 1849
- Barangays: 30 (see Barangays)

Government
  - Type: Sangguniang Bayan
  - Mayor: Alexis S. Quina
  - Vice Mayor: Felix H. Borromeo
  - Representative: Karen Lagbas
  - Municipal Council: Members: John M. Romualdo; Cristina Teresa M. Ociones; Jesus M. Banaag; Helen P. Mabao; Alvin A. Edades; Adonis J. Gayramon; Crisogono G. Llido Jr.; Ligaya B. Aganap
  - Electorate: 52,740 voters (2025)

Area
  - Total: 147.11 km^{2} (56.80 sq mi)
- Elevation: 47 m (154 ft)
- Highest elevation: 365 m (1,198 ft)
- Lowest elevation: −1 m (−3.3 ft)

Population (2024 census)
  - Total: 76,877
  - Density: 522.58/km^{2} (1,353.5/sq mi)
  - Households: 17,345
- Demonym: Balingasagon

Economy
  - Income class: 1st municipal income class
  - Poverty incidence: 25.77% (2023)
  - Revenue: ₱ 373.4 million (2024)
  - Assets: ₱ 968.3 million (2024)
  - Expenditure: ₱ 324.2 million (2024)
  - Liabilities: ₱ 217.9 million (2024)

Service provider
  - Electricity: Misamis Oriental 2 Rural Electric Cooperative (MORESCO 2)
- Time zone: UTC+8 (PST)
- ZIP code: 9005
- PSGC: 1004302000
- IDD : area code: +63 (0)88
- Native languages: Cebuano; Binukid; Subanon; Tagalog
- Website: www.knowbalingasag.com

Balingasag, officially the Municipality of Balingasag (Note: Cebuano: Lungsod sa Balingasag; Tagalog: Bayan ng Balingasag; Cuyonon: Banwa i'ang Balingasag; Central Bikol: Banwaan kan Balingasag; Hiligaynon: Banwa sang Balingasag; Maranao: Inged a Balingasag; Maguindanaon: Inged nu Balingasag; Tausug: Kawman sin Balingasag; Ilocano: Ili ti Balingasag; Kapampangan: Balen ning Balingasag; Pangasinan: Baley na Balingasag; Waray: Bungto han Balingasag), is a municipality in the province of Misamis Oriental, Philippines. According to the 2024 census, it has a population of 76,877 people.

The town is being pushed to be included in the UNESCO World Heritage List due to its impressive array of colonial structures with hints of indigenous Mindanaoan architecture.

== Etymology ==
The municipality's name came from two contracted Cebuano words "baling", which means fish net, and "kasag", crab.

== History ==
Balingasag started as a pre-Hispanic settlement, which was eventually discovered by the Spaniards when they came to colonize the Philippines.

Legend has it that one day during the Spanish regime a group of guardia civil, while patrolling the seashore near the settlement of the natives, chanced upon some fishermen pulling fishing nets. A guardia civil asked a fisherman for the name of the place. Not understanding the language and thinking that he was asked what he what was doing, the fisherman, pointing his finger to the net, answered “baling”, and then turning it to the contents of the boat nearby, added “kasag”.

According to early accounts, the present town site of Balingasag was heavily forested, making it the favorite hiding place of bandits and pirates, who constantly terrorized the inhabitants. One of the notorious groups marauding the area was that of Datu Gumpot, who made the area now occupied by Cala-cala, a sitio of Barangay Cogon, as his base. This place was then known as Gumpot Kitagtag. The presence of these lawless elements in the area made the inhabitants evacuate to safer places every now and then.

Gumpot's group later on disappeared and never came back. This motivated the natives to settle. One group, however, moved to Galas, a part of the place known as Sabangan, an area somewhere between what is now Barangay Waterfall and Barangay Baliwagan. The other group remained at Gumpot Kitagtag.

Galas was ruled by Datu Marcos and his wife, Ba’ai Gregoria. On the other hand, Gumpot Kitagtag was under Datu Mateo and his wife Ba’ai Tomasa. Though these rulers now had their own territory, they remained true and loyal to each other. Marriages between the members of these two tribes further strengthened the bond that had since bound the two leaders. Notable of these conjugal unions was that of Marcos Antonio, the son of Datu Marcos, and Rita Gregoria, the daughter of Datu Mateo.

Eventually, these two great leaders died and were succeeded by their sons. Marcos Antonio became the Datu of Galas and Manuel Mateo ruled Gumpot Kitagtag. These new leaders maintained the alliance established by their predecessors. They constantly communicated with each other and discussed means, or undertook activities, to improve their settlements.

In one of their meetings, the idea of establishing a common place, where the members of their tribes could meet and conduct commercial or social activities, was developed. The two rulers, together with their respective followers, presented their choices. Finally, they decided to locate their meeting place or “poblacion” diha tungod nianang balinganan ta sa kasag (in the place where we catch crabs). This place was part of Galas.

The “poblacion” grew and became popular. In 1749, the Spanish Authority recognized the place and the whole territory of Sabangan under the name Balingasag. Thus, Sabangan could be considered as the old Balingasag.

In 1790, a great flood swept Sabangan, leaving the inhabitants nothing but desolation and depression. After the flood, the leader of Galas this time, Datu Antonio Ramon, the son of Datu Marcos Antonio, proposed to his followers the notion of transferring their settlement to a safer place. The inhabitants loved their place so much that they disagreed with the idea of their chieftain. In the end, however, the leader prevailed upon the followers.

Datu Antonio Ramon and his followers eyed Gumpot Kitagtag, now under the control of Datu Mamerto Manuel, the son and successor of Datu Manuel Mateo, as the ideal place to relocate. Negotiations ensued. After the conditions were agreed by both parties, the transfer began sometime in 1793 and was completed in 1810.

One of the important agreements between the two groups was to divide the poblacion into two. The present Rizal Street, then called Calle Real, which now traverses the span between the gate of Balingasag Central School and the town's wharf, became the demarcation line. All lots on the right side of this street, when facing mountain, and all agricultural lands as far as Baliwagan, would belong to Datu Antonio Ramon and his followers. To Datu Mamerto Manuel and his followers went all the lots on the opposite side of the poblacion and all the agricultural lands as far as Mandangoa. Governor General Narciso Claveria issued on 21 November 1841 a decree (Renovacion de Apellidos) requiring the natives to change their family names and if they had none, they have to adopt a new one. Consequently, Datu Mamerto Manuel chose “Valmores” as his surname, while Datu Antonio Ramon opted for “Madroño”.

Balingasag, being the name recognized by the Spanish Authority, gradually replaced the name of the territory that was Gumpot Kitagtag. In 1842, Balingasag was finally given official recognition as a town through a Spanish Royal Decree. If this royal decree were the basis of the existence of the present Balingasag, Mamerto Manuel Valmores and Antonio Ramon Madroño would then be considered as the “Founding Patriarchs” of this municipality.

The royal recognition of Balingasag as a political or administrative entity under the Spanish sovereignty engendered new systems and structures of governance, which supplanted the indigenous ways of running community affairs. This time the head of the community was the gobernadorcillo, which bore the title capitan. This position is equivalent to the present day Municipal Mayor.

Mamerto Manuel Valmores was appointed in 1820 as the first gobernadorcillo of the town. The last gobernadorcillo was Leon Valmores. Holding this position for about 16 years (1822-1837), Francisco Anuario Valmores, the eldest son of Mamerto Manuel, may be considered as the longest serving gobernadorcillo.

New leaders had surfaced as changes in the Philippine government took place. Faustino Vega became the first town executive, which has known that time as presidente local, under the short-lived First Philippine Republic (1898-1903). Melquiades Vega, the son of Faustino Vega, served as the first presidente local under the American Regime (1903-1928).

Ramon Neri Ludeña became the first mayor under the Commonwealth Government while Jose P. Roa served the same position during World War II (1938-1944). The first municipal mayor under the Republic of the Philippines was Gorgonio B. Tagarda.

The more recent elected town mayors included Manuel Varquez; Alejo E. Olano, Sr; Porferio R. Roa; Andrea H. Borromeo, Felix H. Borromeo and lawyer Alexis Quina, who is known for civil development. Marietta R. Abogado, daughter of former municipal mayor Porferio Roa assumed the town's top post last June 30, 2016.

== Geography ==
=== Barangays ===
Balingasag is politically subdivided into 30 barangays. Each barangay consists of puroks while some have sitios.

- Balagnan
- Baliwagan
- San Francisco
- Binitinan
- Blanco
- Calawag
- Camuayan
- Cogon
- Dansuli
- Dumarait
- Hermano
- Kibanban
- Linabu
- Linggangao
- Mambayaan
- Mandangoa
- Napaliran
- Barangay 1 (Poblacion)
- Barangay 2 (Poblacion)
- Barangay 3 (Poblacion)
- Barangay 4 (Poblacion)
- Barangay 5 (Poblacion)
- Barangay 6 (Poblacion)
- Quezon
- Rosario
- Samay
- San Isidro
- San Juan
- Talusan
- Waterfall

=== Climate ===
Climate data for Balingasag, Misamis Oriental
Month	Jan	Feb	Mar	Apr	May	Jun	Jul	Aug	Sep	Oct	Nov	Dec	Year
Mean daily maximum °C (°F)	28 (82)	28 (82)	29 (84)	30 (86)	30 (86)	30 (86)	30 (86)	30 (86)	30 (86)	29 (84)	29 (84)	28 (82)	29 (85)
Mean daily minimum °C (°F)	23 (73)	23 (73)	23 (73)	23 (73)	25 (77)	25 (77)	25 (77)	25 (77)	25 (77)	25 (77)	24 (75)	24 (75)	24 (75)
Average precipitation mm (inches)	327 (12.9)	254 (10.0)	185 (7.3)	128 (5.0)	215 (8.5)	273 (10.7)	248 (9.8)	243 (9.6)	214 (8.4)	246 (9.7)	271 (10.7)	271 (10.7)	2,875 (113.3)
Average rainy days	24.3	21.1	22.5	20.6	28.3	28.8	29.4	29.0	28.0	28.3	26.0	24.2	310.5
Source: Meteoblue

== Demographics ==
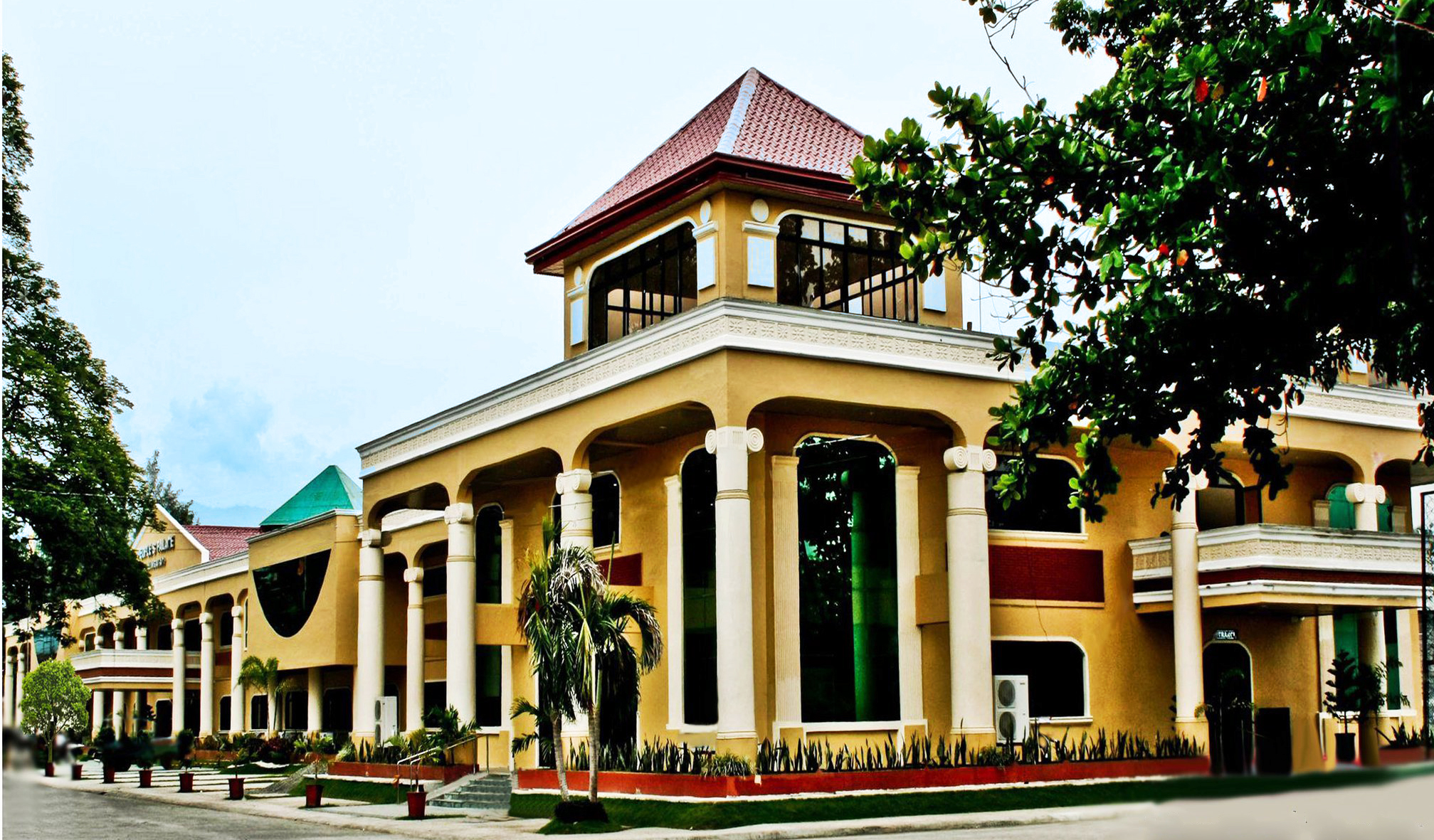
People's Palace (Municipal Hall)

Population census of Balingasag

Year	Pop.	±% p.a.
1903	4,383	—
1918	15,154	+8.62%
1939	20,948	+1.55%
1948	26,270	+2.55%
1960	19,715	−2.36%
1970	26,389	+2.96%
1975	31,811	+3.82%
1980	38,364	+3.82%

Year	Pop.	±% p.a.
1990	41,506	+0.79%
1995	46,018	+1.95%
2000	51,782	+2.56%
2007	57,765	+1.52%
2010	65,876	+4.90%
2015	67,059	+0.34%
2020	74,385	+2.21%
2024	76,877	+0.79%

Source: Philippine Statistics Authority

In the 2024 census, the population of Balingasag was 76,877 people, with a density of 520 inhabitants per square kilometre or 1,300 inhabitants per square mile.

=== Ethnicity and Language ===
Higaonon and Binukid peoples were Balingasag's first inhabitants, albeit are minority today mainly due to the periods of migrations from other parts of the country since the Spanish colonial times. The majority of the municipality's residents today are descended from Visayans who came from Cebu, Bohol, Siquijor and Negros Oriental before Spanish colonial era. However, other ethnolinguistic groups also made residents of Balingasag, such as Bicolanos, Hiligaynons, Ilocanos, Kapampangans, Tagalogs and Warays whose ancestors or settlers themselves who came to the municipality for employment opportunities in logging, mining, farming, fishing, trading and teaching during the late Spanish and American colonial periods and since postwar era, making the municipality a melting pot of cultures. Maranaos and Maguindanaons also dwell in Balingasag.

Cebuano is the widely spoken dominant language in Balingasag. It is also spoken with a Balingasag variant, similar to a dialect spoken in the neighboring municipality of Jasaan that has influences from indigenous Higaonon and Binukid languages, while Higaonons and Binukid has also their own languages mutually intelligible to each other. Balingasag has minor but significant speakers of other languages such as Boholano dialect of Cebuano, Bicolano, Hiligaynon, Ilocano, Kapampangan, Pangasinan and Waray, as well as Subanon, Maranao and Maguindanaon in addition to Cebuano. Tagalog/Filipino and English are used as the primary formal medium of instructions in schools, while the former is widely understood by residents, who often use it in varying professional fields.

=== Religion ===
Balingasag has predominant Roman Catholic Christian population, with Santo Niño as its patron saint. Other religious groups include Assembly of God, the United Church of Christ in the Philippines (UCCP), Baptist and Bible Fundamental churches, Seventh Day Adventist Churches, Iglesia ni Cristo, Members Church of God International and other denominations. Islam, practiced by Maranaos and Maguindanaons as well as the Balik Islam (converts to Islam), has small but growing adherents in the municipality, having two mosques being located there, one in Barangay Mambayaan and the other in Barangay Waterfall.

== Economy ==
Poverty incidence of Balingasag

Source: Philippine Statistics Authority

== Education ==
- St. Peter's College of Balingasag
- St. Rita's College of Balingasag
- Misamis Oriental Institute of Science and Technology

== List of Cultural Properties of Balingasag ==
Cultural Property wmph identifier (Note: wmph is an internal identifier used by Wikimedia Philippines to identify the monument. This is not an official identifier, and only shown temporarily in the templates until the government creates an updated complete list.)	Site name	Description	Province	City or municipality	Address	Coordinates	Image
	Abuzo House		Misamis Oriental	Balingasag	849 Valmores St.	8°44′40″N 124°46′32″E	Upload file
	Acantilado House		Misamis Oriental	Balingasag	F. Vega corner Mabini Sts.	8°44′42″N 124°46′44″E	Upload file
	Albason Roa House		Misamis Oriental	Balingasag	Ludeña cor. Tres Martires Sts.	8°44′33″N 124°46′31″E	Upload file
	Almendrala Ancestral House		Misamis Oriental	Balingasag	Tres Martires cor. Olano Sts.	8°44′30″N 124°46′25″E	Upload file
	Amparo Valmores-Roa House		Misamis Oriental	Balingasag	15 de Setiembre St.	8°44′42″N 124°46′42″E	Upload file
	Anastacio Bablera, Sr. House		Misamis Oriental	Balingasag	Tres Martires cor. Capili Sts.	8°44′29″N 124°46′32″E	Upload file
	Antonio Buzun House		Misamis Oriental	Balingasag	15 de Setiembre St.	8°44′42″N 124°46′43″E	Upload file
	Apolonio Kalaga Gamolo Ancestral House		Misamis Oriental	Balingasag	50 M. E. Mundo St.	8°44′47″N 124°46′36″E	Upload file
	Apolonio Pabelonio House		Misamis Oriental	Balingasag	Varquez St.	8°44′43″N 124°46′41″E	Upload file
	Bahica House	Built in 1945	Misamis Oriental	Balingasag	Tres Martires cor. Capili Sts.	8°44′29″N 124°46′33″E	Upload file
	Valdehueza House		Misamis Oriental	Balingasag	Ludeña cor. Mabini Sts.	8°44′39″N 124°46′45″E	Upload file
	Balingasag Catholic Cemetery	With extant hewn stone perimeter fence	Misamis Oriental	Balingasag	J. P. Roa St.	8°44′48″N 124°46′28″E	Upload file
	Balingasag Central Elementary School	American-era, Gabaldon-type School building	Misamis Oriental	Balingasag	Lopez Jaena St.	8°44′42″N 124°46′48″E	Upload file
	Barretto House		Misamis Oriental	Balingasag	Cailing St.	8°44′44″N 124°46′37″E	Upload file
	Bautista-Roa House		Misamis Oriental	Balingasag	Cailing cor. Malvar Sts.	8°44′46″N 124°46′38″E	Upload file
	Beneta Fernandez Ancestral House		Misamis Oriental	Balingasag	10 Valmores cor. Seriña Sts.	8°44′42″N 124°46′37″E	Upload file
	Cornelio Echeveria-Galdo House		Misamis Oriental	Balingasag	15 de Septiembre cor. Mabini Sts.	8°44′43″N 124°46′43″E	Upload file
	Cubillo-Luardo Maternity Clinic		Misamis Oriental	Balingasag	Rizal cor. Varquez Sts.	8°44′39″N 124°46′43″E	Upload file
	Delos Reyes House		Misamis Oriental	Balingasag	Varquez St.	8°44′48″N 124°46′39″E	Upload file
	Delos Santos House	Erected in 1910	Misamis Oriental	Balingasag	Varquez St.	8°44′46″N 124°46′41″E	Upload file
	Dr. Lino M. Seriña House		Misamis Oriental	Balingasag	Valmores cor. Regalado Sts.	8°44′42″N 124°46′36″E	Upload file
	Nemesio and Ciriaca Vega's Residence		Misamis Oriental	Balingasag	Ludeña cor. Regalado Sts.	8°44′35″N 124°45′26″E	Upload file
	Emeterio Moreno Ancestral House		Misamis Oriental	Balingasag	Ludeña cor. Roa Sts.	8°44′35″N 124°46′37″E	Upload file
	Emilio Domo Ancestral House		Misamis Oriental	Balingasag	M. E. Mundo cor. Varquez Sts.	8°44′48″N 124°46′38″E	Upload file
	Gervacio Gamolo Sr. Ancestral House		Misamis Oriental	Balingasag	Cailing cor. Seriña Sts.	8°44′44″N 124°46′36″E	Upload file
	Fructuoso Ebcas House		Misamis Oriental	Balingasag	M.E. Mundo cor. J. P. Roa Sts.	8°44′43″N 124°46′29″E	Upload file
	Soliva House		Misamis Oriental	Balingasag	Madronio St.	8°44′30″N 124°46′31″E	Upload file
	Go House		Misamis Oriental	Balingasag	F. Vega cor. Seriña Sts.	8°47′39″N 124°46′39″E	Upload file
	Go King House		Misamis Oriental	Balingasag	F. Vega cor. Varquez Sts.	8°44′41″N 124°46′42″E	Upload file
	Gora & Vergara Ancestral House		Misamis Oriental	Balingasag	F. Vega cor. Varquez Sts.	8°44′41″N 124°46′42″E	Upload file
	Hermogenes Sabugan House		Misamis Oriental	Balingasag	F. Vega cor. Mabini Sts.	8°44′41″N 124°46′45″E	Upload file
	Ignacio Valmores House		Misamis Oriental	Balingasag	105 Cailing cor. Varquez Sts.	8°44′46″N 124°46′39″E	Upload file
	Inguito House		Misamis Oriental	Balingasag	M.E. Mundo cor. Malvar Sts.	8°44′48″N 124°46′37″E	Upload file
	Isabelo Roa House		Misamis Oriental	Balingasag	Valmores cor. Malvar Sts.	8°44′44″N 124°46′38″E	Upload file
	Jesus Chaves Ancestral House		Misamis Oriental	Balingasag	15 de Setiembre St.	8°44′41″N 124°46′38″E	Upload file
	Jose Autor House		Misamis Oriental	Balingasag	1046 Cailing cor. J. P. Roa Sts.	8°44′41″N 124°46′30″E	Upload file
	Jose Moreno House		Misamis Oriental	Balingasag	Ludeña cor. Roa Sts.	8°44′42″N 124°46′36″E	Upload file
	Jose Valmores Pimentel House		Misamis Oriental	Balingasag	Cailing cor. Roa Sts.	8°44′42″N 124°46′33″E	Upload file
	Juan Almendrala House		Misamis Oriental	Balingasag	Olano cor. Unnamed Road	8°44′30″N 124°46′30″E	Upload file
	Juan Salvane House		Misamis Oriental	Balingasag	Tres Martires St.	8°44′31″N 124°46′39″E	Upload file
	Juanito Valmores House		Misamis Oriental	Balingasag	Rizal cor. Mabini Sts.	8°44′41″N 124°46′45″E	Upload file
	Lagumbay House		Misamis Oriental	Balingasag	M.E. Mundo cor. J.P. Roa	8°44′44″N 124°46′30″E	Upload file
	Leovegildo Sinogaya House		Misamis Oriental	Balingasag	Cailing St.	8°44′41″N 124°46′29″E	Upload file
	Ludeña House		Misamis Oriental	Balingasag	Ludeña cor. Tres Martires Sts.	8°43′25″N 124°46′31″E	Upload file
	Macario Ladera House		Misamis Oriental	Balingasag	Capili St.	8°44′27″N 124°46′30″E	Upload file
	Magsalay House		Misamis Oriental	Balingasag	1008 15 de Setiembre St.	8°44′38″N 124°46′31″E	Upload file
	Mangubat House		Misamis Oriental	Balingasag	145 Cailing cor. Roa Sts.	8°44′43″N 124°46′33″E	Upload file
	Maria and Maximo Achas Ancestral House		Misamis Oriental	Balingasag	M. E. Mundo St.	8°44′43″N 124°46′28″E	Upload file
	Maximo Valmores House		Misamis Oriental	Balingasag	Valmores cor. Seriña Sts.	8°44′43″N 124°46′37″E	Upload file
	Mayuman Ancestral House		Misamis Oriental	Balingasag	F. Vega St.	8°44′41″N 124°46′44″E	Upload file
	Melquides Achas Ancestral House		Misamis Oriental	Balingasag	138 M. E. Mundo cor. Osmeña Sts.	8°44′44″N 124°46′32″E	Upload file
	Mercado Avelino House		Misamis Oriental	Balingasag	118 Cailing cor. Roa Sts.	8°44′43″N 124°46′33″E	Upload file
	Mercado Valmores House		Misamis Oriental	Balingasag	15 de Setiembre cor. Varquez Sts.	8°44′43″N 124°46′42″E	Upload file
	Cuerquez Ancestral House	Ancestral house of Tirso Cuerquez, son of Saturnino Cuerquis	Misamis Oriental	Balingasag	Tres Martires cor. Madronio Sts.	8°44′31″N 124°46′31″E	Upload file
	Olano House		Misamis Oriental	Balingasag	Regalado cor. F. Vega Sts.	8°44′39″N 124°46′37″E	Upload file
	Pedro Zaballero Ancestral House		Misamis Oriental	Balingasag	12 M. E. Mundo cor, Varquez Sts.	8°44′48″N 124°46′39″E	Upload file
	Prisco Fabre House		Misamis Oriental	Balingasag	45 Varquez cor. Valmores Sts.	8°44′44″N 124°46′40″E	Upload file
	Prudencio Roa Ancestral House		Misamis Oriental	Balingasag	Valmores cor. Seriña Sts.	8°44′43″N 124°46′36″E	Upload file
	Ramona Pabualan-Sabal House		Misamis Oriental	Balingasag	Cailing cor. Malvar Sts.	8°44′45″N 124°46′38″E	Upload file
	Ramon Chua House		Misamis Oriental	Balingasag	Rizal cor. Malvar Sts.	8°44′39″N 124°46′42″E	Upload file
	Ramon Roa Sr. House		Misamis Oriental	Balingasag	Cailing cor. Malvar Sts.	8°44′45″N 124°46′38″E	Upload file
	Ricardo Singhedas House		Misamis Oriental	Balingasag	Valmores cor. Osmeña Sts.	8°44′41″N 124°46′33″E	Upload file
	Roa-Miguel Ancestral House		Misamis Oriental	Balingasag	Ludeña cor. Mabini Sts.	8°44′38″N 124°46′46″E	Upload file
	Rogelio Mercado House		Misamis Oriental	Balingasag	Ludeña cor. Malvar Sts.	8°44′37″N 124°46′42″E	Upload file
	Severino and Purificacion Romualdo House		Misamis Oriental	Balingasag	Cailing cor. J. P. Roa Sts.	8°44′41″N 124°46′30″E	Upload file
	Roque Valmores Ancestral House	Erected on August 16, 1938	Misamis Oriental	Balingasag	M. E. Mundo cor. Seriña Sts.	8°44′46″N 124°46′35″E	Upload file
	Santa Rita de Cascia Parish Church	Spanish-era brick church	Misamis Oriental	Balingasag	Tres Martires St.	8°44′36″N 124°46′31″E	Upload file
	Serna-Valmores House		Misamis Oriental	Balingasag	Varquez St.	8°44′45″N 124°46′41″E	Upload file
	Severino Pimentel House		Misamis Oriental	Balingasag	Ludeña cor. Regalado Sts.	8°44′36″N 124°46′26″E	Upload file
	Tan House		Misamis Oriental	Balingasag	15 de Setiembre St.	8°44′43″N 124°46′44″E	Upload file
	Tanasia Roa House		Misamis Oriental	Balingasag	1011 M. E. Mundo St.	8°44′44″N 124°46′31″E	Upload file
	Teodolo Velos House		Misamis Oriental	Balingasag	Tres Martires cor. Capili Sts.	8°44′30″N 124°46′33″E	Upload file
	Unnamed House 1 in Brgy 1		Misamis Oriental	Balingasag	15 de Setiembre St.	8°44′43″N 124°46′42″E	Upload file
	Unnamed House 2 in Brgy 2		Misamis Oriental	Balingasag	15 de Setiembre cor. Seriña Sts.	8°44′40″N 124°46′38″E	Upload file
	Unnamed House in Barangay 3		Misamis Oriental	Balingasag	Regalado cor. F. Vega Sts.	8°44′38″N 124°46′37″E	Upload file
	Unnamed House in Barangay 5		Misamis Oriental	Balingasag	Tres Martires cor. Madronio Sts.	8°44′32″N 124°46′32″E	Upload file
	Valdovino Zaballero Ancestral House		Misamis Oriental	Balingasag	M. E. Mundo St.	8°44′48″N 124°46′38″E	Upload file
	Valmores House		Misamis Oriental	Balingasag	94 Varquez St.	8°44′45″N 124°46′40″E	Upload file
	Vega Ancestral House		Misamis Oriental	Balingasag	Regalado cor. Rizal Sts.	8°44′37″N 124°46′38″E	Upload file
	Vicente Macas House		Misamis Oriental	Balingasag	Valmores St.	8°44′44″N 124°46′40″E	Upload file

== Tourism ==
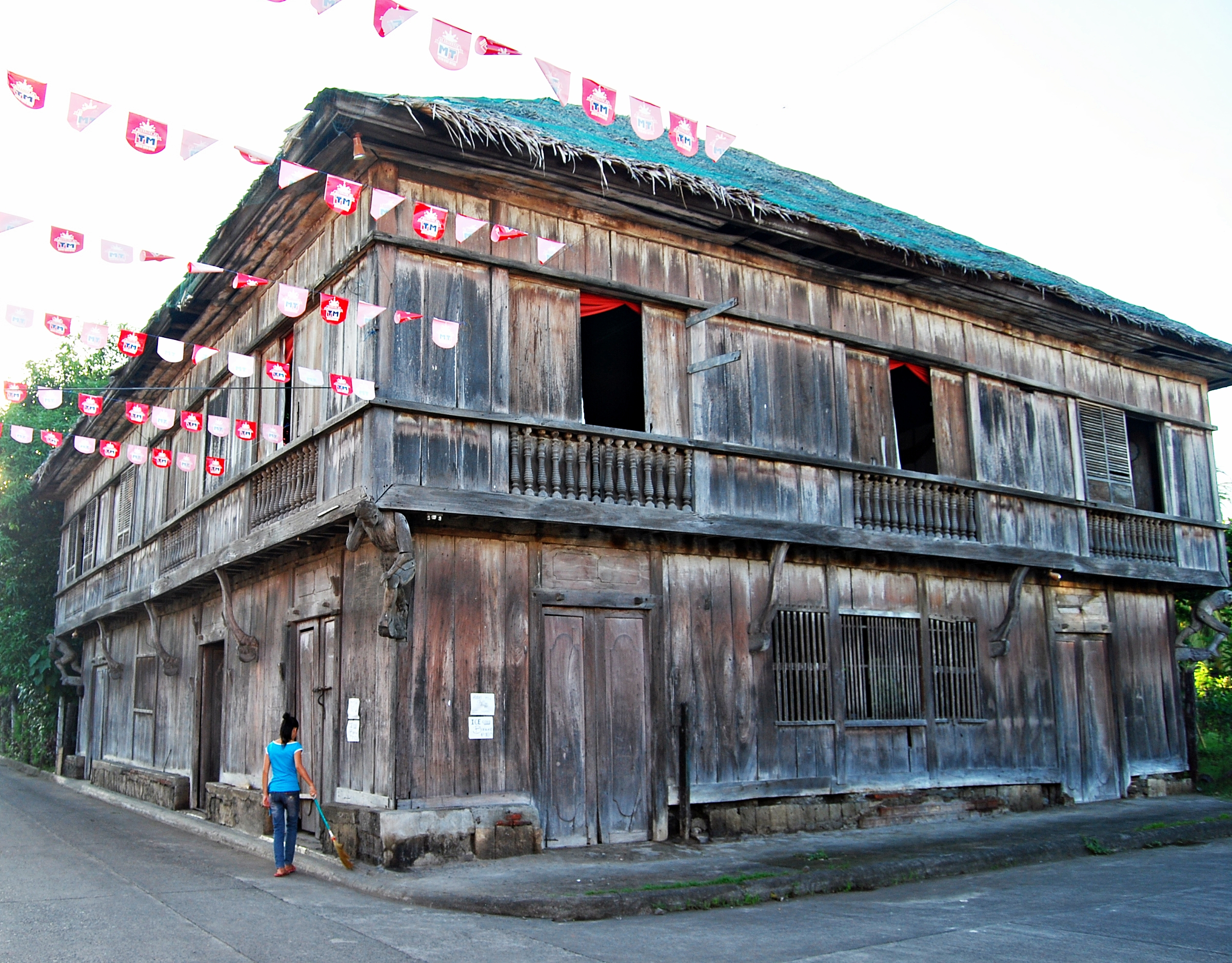
Vega Ancestral House

- Vega Ancestral House - located in the Poblacion district, is a preserved Philippine colonial house which has been visited by national leaders like General Emilio Aguinaldo and President Sergio Osmeña, and Gura - Vergara house that was established 1878. It was where then Inday Badiday, former showbiz anchor, lived as she was from Balingasag.
- St. Rita's College of Balingasag - founded in 1901, the first Catholic School in Balingasag and is also among the top schools in the province.
