= St. Peter's College of Balingasag =

Private college in Misamis Oriental, Philippines

St. Peter's College of Misamis Oriental, Inc.
- Former name: St. Peter's College (1950)
- Type: Private Non-Sectarian Coeducational basic and higher education institution
- Established: 1950; 76 years ago
- Founders: Miguel D. Paguio; Escolastica Punongbayan-Paguio
- Affiliations: PACUCOA
- President: Gerardo D. Paguio Sr.
- Principal: Alberto G. Palarca
- Location: 115 De Septienbre St., Brgy. 2, Balingasag, Misamis Oriental, Philippines; 8°13′59″N 124°14′13″E
- Campus: Urban
- Location in Mindanao Location in the Philippines

St. Peter's College of Misamis Oriental, Inc. is a private non-sectarian coeducational basic and higher education institution in the municipality of Balingasag, province of Misamis Oriental, Philippines. It was founded by Miguel D. Paguio and his wife Escolastica Punongbayan-Paguio in 1950.

The college was named after St. Peter, the first pope of the Catholic Church, and it was dedicated to his patronage.

== History ==
In the third quarter of school year 1949-1950, St. Peter’s College started operation; its permit was issued in January 1950 by the Director of Bureau of Private Schools, Manila, authorizing the school to offer the Junior Normal Course, two years Associate in Arts, and the first two years in Bachelor of Science in Education. During the pioneering operation, classes were held in rented rooms and buildings. In the regular school year 1950-1951, additional courses were offered: Complete Elementary and Complete High School. Also offered were vocational courses in Stenography and Typewriting.

In 1950-1951, the administration acquired a lot owned by the local government of Balingasag, along the 15th de Septiembre Street facing the public plaza, where the first St. Peter’s College building was constructed. The purchase was facilitated through the representation of Atty. Alejo E. Olano. Through the joint resolution of the Municipal Council, the sale was concluded and approved by the Municipal Mayor, Jose P. Roa. Before the end of the school year 1950-1951, the construction of the school building by Engineer Dodong Salazar of Cebu was completed and all courses offered were recognized by the Government.

On April 22, 1954, the first commencement exercises was held with a handful of graduates in Elementary, High School and Collegiate Departments. Since then, enrolment increased. On July 29, 1969 the co-founder of the school, Mrs. Escolastica Punongbayan Paguio, died.

On October 25, 1973, a great fire in Balingasag burnt down almost all of the commercial buildings, including the St. Peter’s College building, which was totally razed to the ground. Again, the school started to hold classes in rented rooms, including the Balingasag Parish Hall, offered without charge as a temporary classroom by Archbishop Patrick H. Cronin of Cagayan de Oro City. Not long after, through the cooperation of the teaching staff with the High School Principal Pedro L. Olario and under the leadership of Ms. Fe C. Patalinghug, the director of the school at that time, and Gregorio N. Abuzo, the Registrar/Comptroller constructed a temporary school building while waiting to be rehabilitated in the future.

Years later Natividad J. Mofar, the Dean of College, with some of the staff conducted career guidance to the different graduating high school students in the eastern part of Misamis Oriental which drew more students to enrol to the six different courses that the school offered. Collegiate department inspired by the administrative staff and the members of the faculty through the leadership of Enrico R. Valmores the Executive Vice-president, Miguel D. Paguio the President of the institution decided to continue the construction of the two-storey concrete school building (main building) on the same site where the temporary classrooms stood. It was opened on December 27, 1997. The President, Miguel D. Paguio decided to put up a three-storey concrete building (Annex Building) in the old school site facing the public plaza. Construction was started on April 19, 1999 and completed in May 2010 under the School Administrator Lita S. Ladera. Natividad J. Mofar died in August 2010; Judith A Pundaodaya became College Dean.

Since the school's foundation, thousands of students have graduated in different levels of education.
